= List of national roads in Latvia =

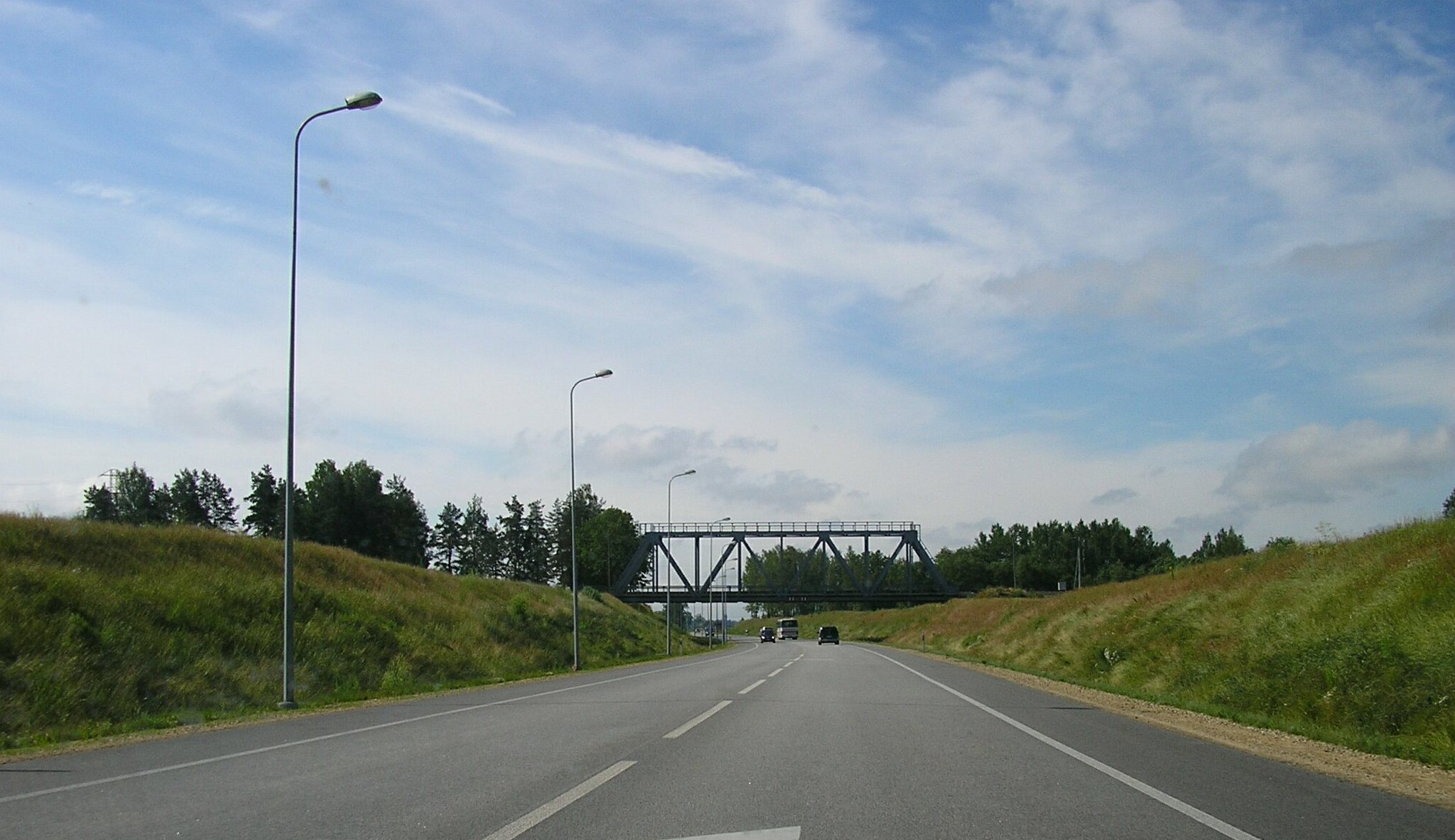
A7 near Iecava

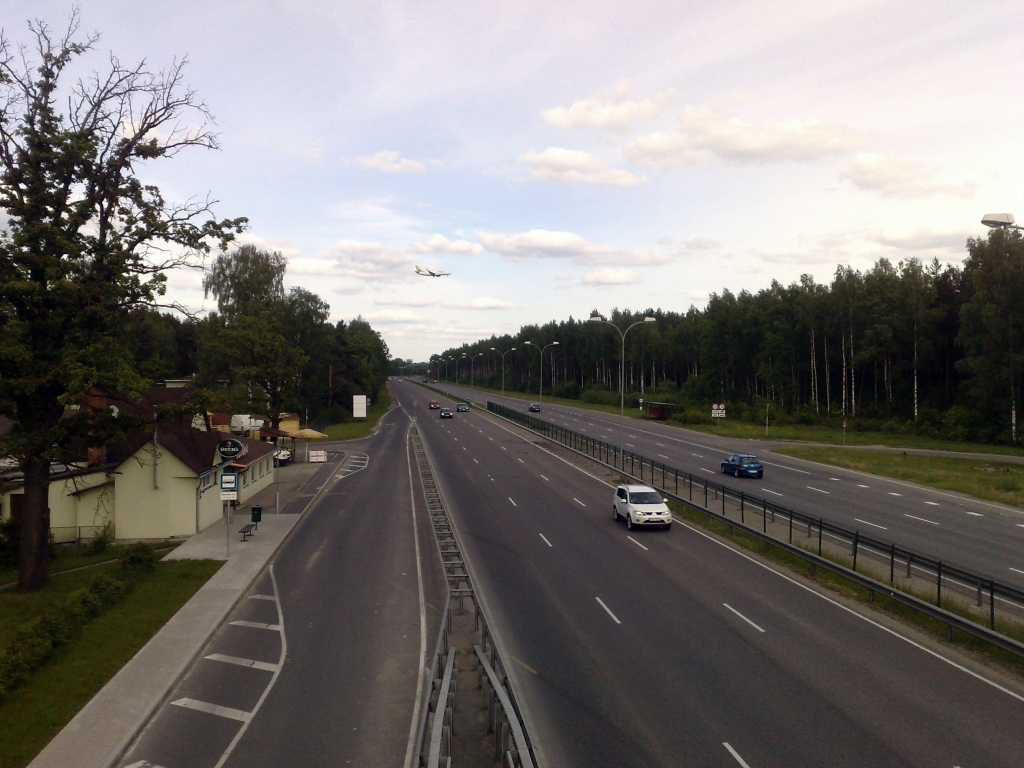
A10 near Riga

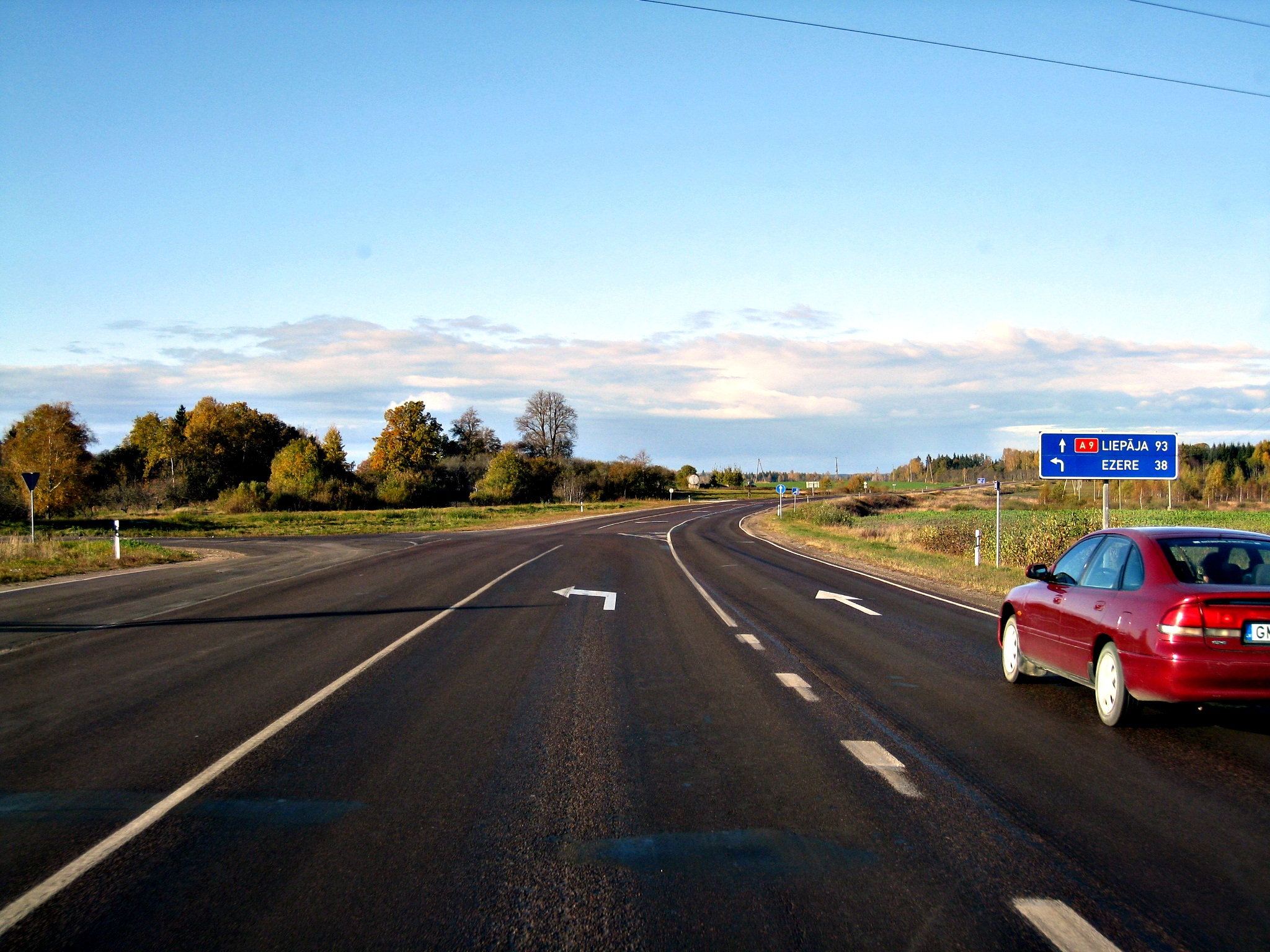
A9 near Skrunda

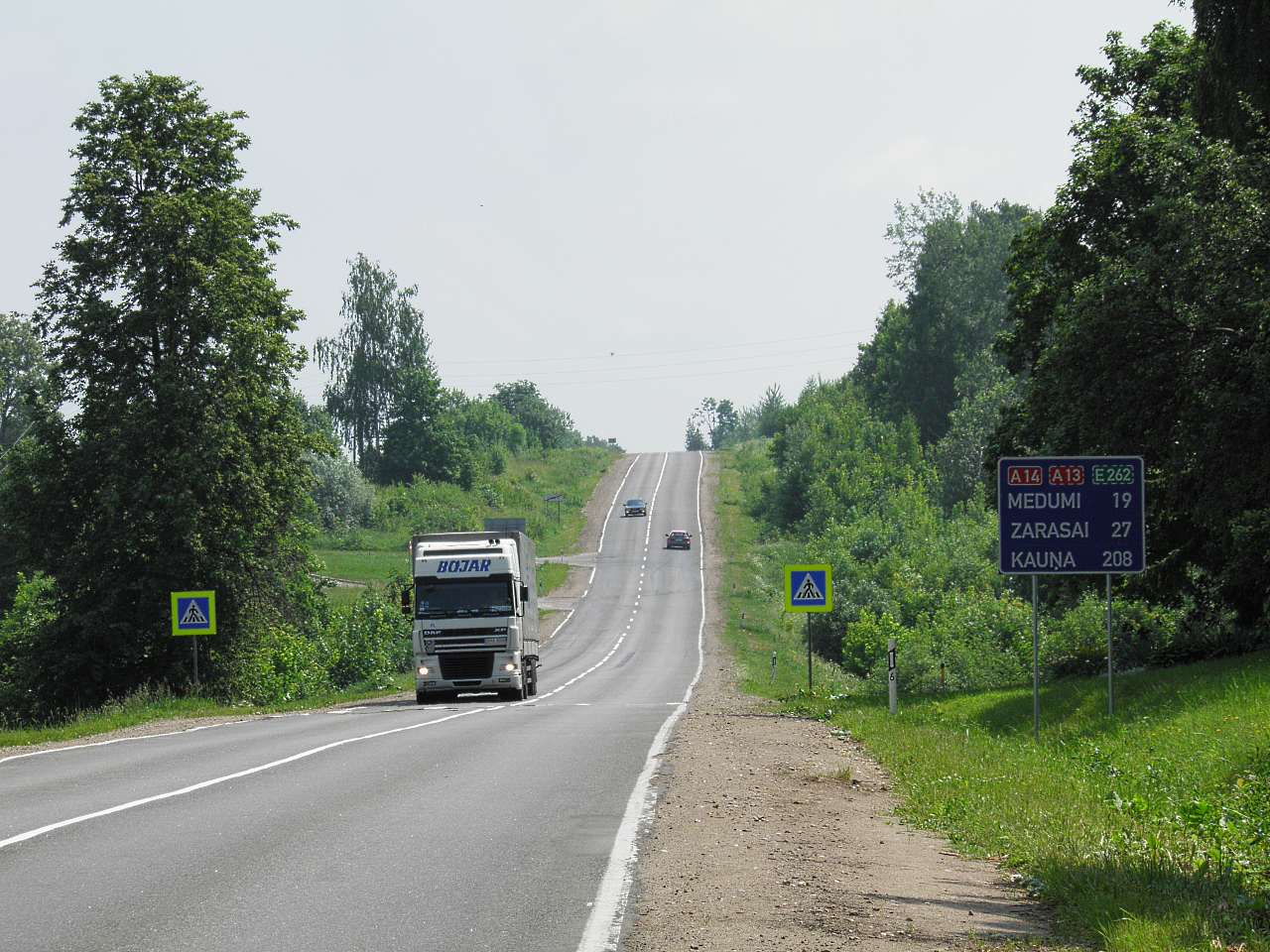
A14 near Svente

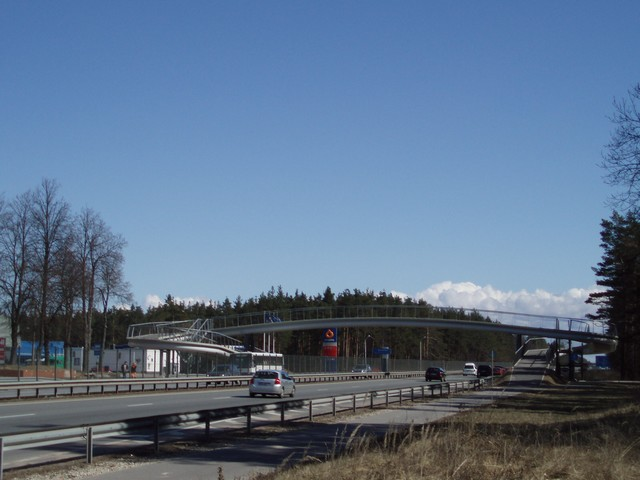
A2 near Garkalne

This is a list of national roads in Latvia:

== State main roads ==
Number	E-road	Route	Length (km)
A 1	E67	Riga – Ainaži (EE border)	101
A 2	E77	Riga – Sigulda – Veclaicene (EE border)	196
A 3	E264	Inčukalns – Valmiera – Valka (EE border)	101
A 4	E67 E77	Riga ring road (Baltezers – Saulkalne)	20
A 5	E67 E77	Riga ring road (Salaspils – Babīte)	40
A 6	E22 E262	Riga – Daugavpils – Krāslava – Pāternieki (BY border)	307
A 7	E67	Riga – Bauska – Grenctāle (LT border)	85
A 8	E77	Riga – Jelgava – Meitene (LT border)	76
A 9		Riga (Skulte) – Liepāja	199
A 10	E22	Riga – Ventspils	190
A 11		Liepāja – Rucava (LT border)	57
A 12	E22 E262	Jēkabpils – Rēzekne – Ludza – Terehova (RU border)	166
A 13	E262	Grebņova (RU border) – Rēzekne – Daugavpils – Medumi (LT border)	163
A 14	E262	Daugavpils ring road (Tilti – Kalkūne)	15
A 15	E262	Rēzekne ring road	7

== State regional roads ==
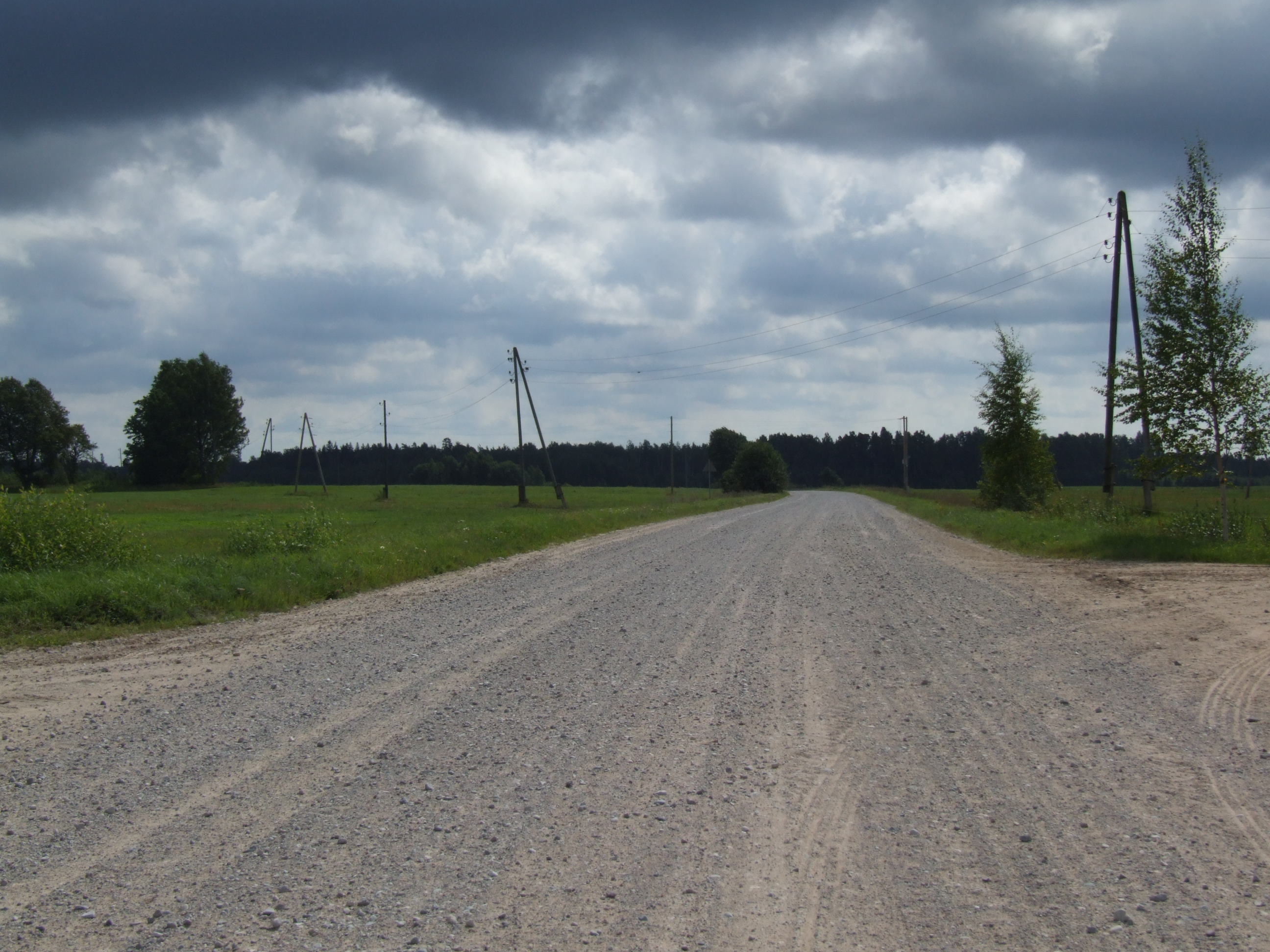
P12 near Salacgrīva

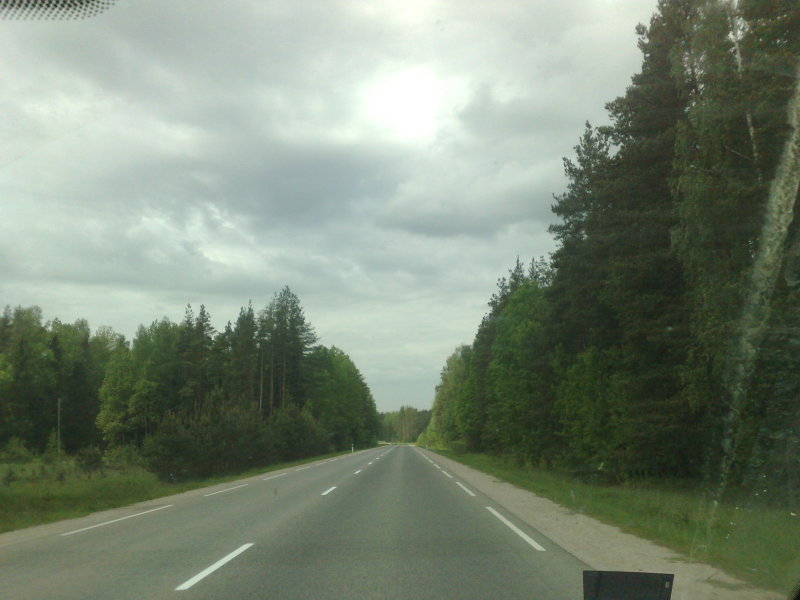
P97 near Gardene

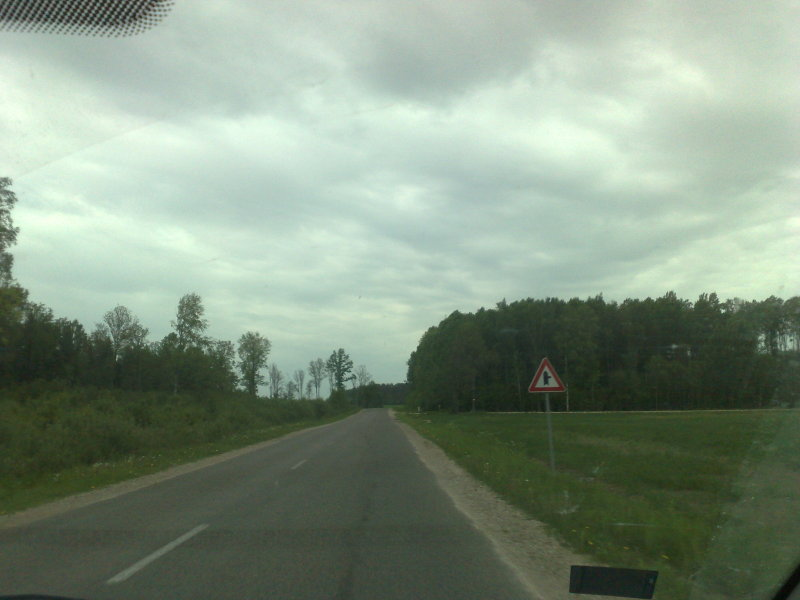
P104 near Jaunpils

Route	Start	Via	End	Length
P 1	Riga (Jaunciems)	Carnikava	Ādaži	32.3 km
P 2	Juglas papīrfabrika		Upesciems	2.7 km
P 3	Garkalne		Alauksts	92.8 km
P 4	Riga		Ērgļi	101.3 km
P 5	Ulbroka		Ogre	26.0 km
P 6	Saulkrasti	Sēja	Ragana	23.9 km
P 7	Ragana		Turaida	9.8 km
P 8	Inciems	Sigulda	Ķegums	72.3 km
P 9	Ragana		Limbaži	38.9 km
P 10	Inčukalns	Ropaži	Ikšķile	40.6 km
P 11	Kocēni	Limbaži	Tūja	59.3 km
P 12	Limbaži		Salacgrīva	44.6 km
P 13	Limbaži		Aloja	31.6 km
P 14	Umurga		Cēsis	39.3 km
P 15	Ainaži		Matīši	60.3 km
P 16	Valmiera	Matīši	Mazsalaca	45.3 km
P 17	Valmiera	Rūjiena	Estonian border (Unguriņi)	55.9 km
P 18	Valmiera		Smiltene	34.5 km
P 19	Ape		Estonian border	4.9 km
P 20	Valmiera	Cēsis	Drabeši	39.9 km
P 21	Rūjiena		Mazsalaca	21.5 km
P 22	Valka		Rūjiena	51.2 km
P 23	Valka		Vireši	48.0 km
P 24	Smiltene		Valka	41.8 km
P 25	Smiltene		Strenči	29.5 km
P 26	Sedas access road			2.5 km
P 27	Smiltene	Velēna	Gulbene	64.1 km
P 28	Priekuļi		Rauna	19.0 km
P 29	Rauna (Vidzemes Highway)	Drusti	Jaunpiebalga	32.0 km
P 30	Cēsis	Vecpiebalga	Madona	86.5 km
P 31	Ērgļi		Drabeši	52.5 km
P 32	Līgatne (Vidzemes Highway)		Skrīveri	73.2 km
P 33	Ērgļi	Jaunpiebalga	Saliņkrogs	61.2 km
P 34	Sinole	Zeltiņi	Silakrogs	41.6 km
P 35	Gulbene	Balvi – Viļaka	Russian border (Vientuļi)	69.5 km
P 36	Rēzekne		Gulbene	87.2 km
P 37	Pļaviņas (Gostiņi)	Madona	Gulbene	90.9 km
P 38	Cesvaine		Velēna	37.6 km
P 39	Alūksne		Estonian border (Ape)	30.3 km
P 40	Alūksne		Zaiceva	25.0 km
P 41	Alūksne		Liepna	33.0 km
P 42	Viļaka	Zaiceva	Russian border (Pededze)	47.4 km
P 43	Litene		Alūksne	27.0 km
P 44	Ilzene		Līzespasts	21.7 km
P 45	Viļaka		Kārsava	53.1 km
P 46	Dubļeva		Cērpene	22.8 km
P 47	Balvi		Kapūne	24.0 km
P 48	Kārsava	Tilža	Dubļukalns	47.8 km
P 49	Kārsava	Ludza	Ezernieki	75.9 km
P 50	Kārsava		Russian border (Aizgārša)	15.2 km
P 51	Ventspils access road			2.5 km
P 52	Zilupe	Šķaune	Ezernieki	59.2 km
P 53	Duči		Limbaži	26.8 km
P 54	Rēzekne		Greiškani	6.7 km
P 55	Rēzekne		Dagda	58.0 km
P 56	Malta		Kaunata	27.3 km
P 57	Malta		Sloboda	36.5 km
P 58	Viļāni	Preiļi	Spoģi	62.4 km
P 59	Viļāni	Ružiņa	Malta	28.9 km
P 60	Dagda		Aglona	35.3 km
P 61	Krāslava		Dagda	34.2 km
P 62	Krāslava	Preiļi	Madona	141.8 km
P 63	Līvāni		Preiļi	35.6 km
P 64	Višķi		Nīcgale	31.5 km
P 65	Stropi		Krauja	5.0 km
P 66	Tabore	(Daugavpils bypass)	Laucese	9.6 km
P 67	Daugavpils		Tilti	13.1 km
P 68	Daugavpils	Skrudaliena	Belarusian border (Silene)	29.5 km
P 69	Skrudaliena	Kaplava	Krāslava	34.9 km
P 70	Svente		Lithuanian border (Subate)	39.0 km
P 71	(Crossed out in compliance with the Regulations of the Cabinet of Ministers of 20.11.2012., No. 788)			
P 72	Ilūkste	Bebrene	Birži	68.0 km
P 73	Vecumnieki	Nereta	Subate	116.5 km
P 74	Siliņi		Aknīste	23.1 km
P 75	Jēkabpils		Lithuanian border (Nereta)	60.6 km
P 76	Aizkraukle		Jēkabpils	46.0 km
P 77	Ventspils		Dundaga	56.2 km
P 78	Pļaviņas		Ērgļi	32.7 km
P 79	Koknese		Ērgļi	38.6 km
P 80	Tīnuži		Koknese	49.8 km
P 81	Bērzaune	Vestiena	Ērgļi	27.2 km
P 82	Jaunkalsnava		Lubāna	56.6 km
P 83	Lubāna		Dzelzava	23.9 km
P 84	Madona		Varakļāni	49.1 km
P 85	Rīgas HES		Jaunjelgava	56.9 km
P 86	Sērene		Kalnieši	39.1 km
P 87	Bauska		Aizkraukle	83.0 km
P 88	Bauska		Linde	51.0 km
P 89	Ķekava		Skaistkalne	55.7 km
P 90	Rīgas HES		Pulkarne	2.3 km
P 91	Mežvidi		Baldone	3.2 km
P 92	Iecava		Stelpe	24.6 km
P 93	Jelgava		Iecava	31.9 km
P 94	Jelgava	Staļģene	Code	35.5 km
P 95	Jelgava	Tērvete	Lithuanian border (Žagarė)	44.8 km
P 96	Puri	Auce	Grivaiši	79.0 km
P 97	Jelgava	Dobele	Annenieki	42.1 km
P 98	Jelgava		Tukums	48.7 km
P 99	Jelgava		Kalnciems	24.4 km
P 100	Ozolnieki		Dalbe	7.7 km
P 101	Kalnciems		Kūdra	11.6 km
P 102	Dobele		Jaunbērze	13.6 km
P 103	Dobele		Bauska	72.9 km
P 104	Tukums	Auce	Lithuanian border (Vītiņi)	69.0 km
P 105	Saldus		Ezere	34.2 km
P 106	Ezere	Embūte	Grobiņa	81.2 km
P 107	Skrunda		Ezere	37.0 km
P 108	Ventspils	Kuldīga	Saldus	106.4 km
P 109	Kandava		Saldus	52.6 km
P 110	Liepāja		Tāši	10.6 km
P 111	Ventspils		Grobiņa	95.6 km
P 112	Kuldīga	Aizpute	Līči	68.6 km
P 113	Grobiņa	Bārta	Rucava	51.8 km
P 114	Priekule		Lithuanian border (Plūdoņi)	20.9 km
P 115	Aizpute		Kalvene	17.2 km
P 116	Kuldīga	Skrunda	Embūte	61.5 km
P 117	Skrunda		Aizpute	26.8 km
P 118	Kuldīgas bypass			9.4 km
P 119	Kuldīga	Alsunga	Jūrkalne	40.3 km
P 120	Talsi	Stende	Kuldīga	58.2 km
P 121	Tukums		Kuldīga	82.2 km
P 122	Ventspils		Piltene	24.0 km
P 123	Zlēkas		Ugāle	26.5 km
P 124	Ventspils		Kolka	75.4 km
P 125	Talsi	Dundaga	Mazirbe	58.4 km
P 126	Valdgale		Roja	31.6 km
P 127	Talsi		Upesgrīva	34.3 km
P 128	Sloka		Talsi	73.8 km
P 129	Talsu bypass			6.7 km
P 130	Līgas	Kandava	Veģi	28.0 km
P 131	Tukums	Ķesterciems – Mērsrags	Kolka	107.7 km
P 132	Riga		Mārupe	9.1 km
P 133	Access road to Riga International Airport			2.1 km
P 134	Access road to Liepāja airport			2.4 km
P 135	Priekule		Vaiņode	19.9 km

== State local roads ==
Approximately one thousand roads in Latvia are categorised under the state local road category. The total length of the local roads is 13,181.616 kilometres (8,190.676 mi), of which 10,570.151 kilometres (6,567.987 mi) are hard-surface and 2,611.465 kilometres (1,622.689 mi) are crushed stone or graveled.

These roads are designated by the letter V by the Latvian State Roads, but this classification not used in signage.
