= A2 road (Latvia) =

Road in Latvia

A2
- Vidzemes šoseja

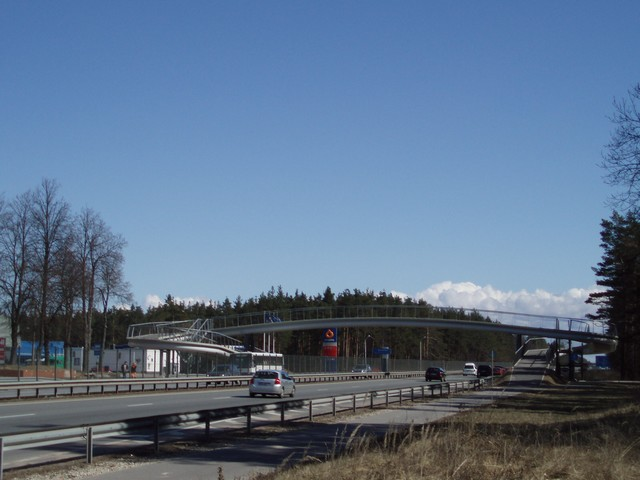
- The A2 near Berģi

Route information
- Part of E77
- Length: 195.6 km (121.5 mi)

Major junctions
- West end: Riga
- A 1 A 4 near Baltezers; P 3 near Garkalne; A 3 near Inčukalns; P 10 near Inčukalns; P 8 in Sigulda; P 32 near Augšlīgatne; P 20 near Melturi; P 31 near Drabeši; P 30 at Bērzkrogs; P 29 near Rauna; P 27 near Smiltene; P 23 near Vireši; P 44 near Līzespasts; P 39 near Ape
- East end: Estonia border near Veclaicene; E77 / T7

Location
- Country: Latvia
- Major cities: Riga, Sigulda

Highway system
- National Roads in Latvia
← A 1	→ A 3

The A2 is a main national road in Latvia. It is officially named Rīga–Sigulda–Igaunijas robeža (Veclaicene) and connects Riga with the Estonian border near Veclaicene. The road is commonly known as the Vidzeme Highway (Vidzemes šoseja), and is historically associated with the Riga–Pskov route. It has a total length of 195.6 km (121.5 mi), of which 179.6 km (111.6 mi) are state-owned and 16.0 km (9.9 mi) are municipal-owned road sections.

The A2 forms part of European route E77 and Latvia's TEN-T road network. At the Estonian border the road continues as European route E77 and Estonian national road 7 toward Võru and the Luhamaa border area.

== Route description ==
The A2 starts in Riga, where the official municipal section follows Brīvības gatve. It leaves the city to the north-east through Berģi and continues toward Garkalne, Vangaži, the Sēnīte junction, Sigulda, Augšlīgatne, Ieriķi, Melturi, Bērzkrogs, Smiltene municipality, Vireši, Līzespasts, Ape and the Estonian border near Veclaicene. The official route list also includes a municipal section in Sigulda, where the A2 follows Vidzemes šoseja.

The A2 is one of the main routes from Riga to north-eastern Latvia. Much of the Riga–Sēnīte–Sigulda corridor has a dual-carriageway or four-lane standard, while the route east of Sigulda is mainly a single-carriageway road with one lane in each direction. The section between the Riga bypass and the A3 at Sēnīte forms the principal high-capacity part of the road.

== Speed management ==
Outside built-up areas the ordinary maximum speed limit is generally 90 km/h (56 mph), unless otherwise signed. The A2 has an adaptive traffic-management system on the Riga–Sigulda corridor. Since 15 April 2026, variable electronic signs between Langstiņi and Sigulda may display a maximum permitted speed of up to 110 km/h (68 mph) in favourable driving conditions. If the electronic signs do not display a speed limit, the maximum permitted speed outside built-up areas is 90 km/h (56 mph).

Electronic road signs on the A2 began operating in December 2022 as part of the SMART E263/E77 project. The system covers the route from km 14.7 to km 191.5 and displays variable speed limits, warnings about road and weather conditions, and other traffic-management information. The project included dynamic signs, road-condition cameras and weather stations. During the autumn and winter season, the adaptive Riga–Sigulda section remains an exception to the general seasonal reduction to 90 km/h (56 mph); in very good conditions it may display 100 km/h (62 mph), while lower limits are shown in poorer conditions.

== History ==
The Riga–Pskov road is one of the oldest overland routes in Latvia. The route is mentioned in written sources from the 13th century, and a route corresponding broadly to the present Vidzeme Highway appears on maps from the 17th century.

Construction of the historical Vidzeme Highway began in 1839. Farms within about 20 km (12 mi) of the construction site had to assist with roadbuilding by providing labour and horse-drawn carts loaded with stones. Construction started from Riga and was completed in 1858, when the road was incorporated into the Saint Petersburg–Pskov–Warsaw road network. Horse post stations operated along the road, including at Bērzkrogs and Līzespasts. Initially, the road was paved with stones; it was asphalted along its full length after World War II.

In the Soviet period, the Riga–Inčukalns section was developed into one of the highest-standard roads in Latvia. A technical and economic study for reconstruction of the Riga–Pskov road between the Riga city boundary and Sigulda was prepared in 1968, and the second carriageway of the Riga–Inčukalns section was completed in autumn 1975. In 1977 the section became a highest technical-category motorway according to the terminology used at the time. The Sēnīte interchange, at the junction of the Vidzeme Highway and the road to Valmiera, included seven road overpasses, a rotary traffic arrangement, parking areas and pedestrian tunnels, and was one of the largest road junction complexes in the Baltic region.

== Expressway-standard plans and later reconstruction ==
In the 2000s, a larger reconstruction of the A2 between the Riga bypass and Sēnīte was planned as one of Latvia's first high-speed road projects. The environmental impact assessment process for the A2 section from the Riga bypass to Sēnīte was started in 2006 and completed in 2007. The planned project covered the section from km 14.9 to km 38.7 and envisaged reconstruction and widening of the existing road, construction and reconstruction of parallel roads and streets, road overpasses, and pedestrian and cyclist overpasses and tunnels. The reconstructed road section, about 23.8 km (14.8 mi) long, was planned as an A1-category high-speed road.

The full Riga bypass–Sēnīte plan was not implemented at that time. Before the 2008 financial crisis, it had been planned to rebuild the road from Riga toward Sēnīte to a high-speed standard, but the project was postponed because of funding constraints. By 2018, a technical design had been prepared for the Garkalne–Sēnīte section, but funding had not yet been allocated for its implementation.

A major reconstruction of the Garkalne–Sēnīte section, km 25.5–39.4, was eventually carried out in 2019–2020. The project rebuilt the pavement structure, renewed nine overpasses at Sēnīte and near Vangaži, renewed the Straujupīte culvert and a pedestrian tunnel near Sēnīte, rebuilt the beginning of the A3, and renewed the bridge over the Gauja. The contract price was €46.58 million, including VAT, with financing from the Latvian state budget and the Cohesion Fund.

At the opening of the reconstructed section in August 2020, the Minister for Transport stated that the rebuilt section would not need to be rebuilt again for future high-speed-road development, but would need to be supplemented, including with two-level crossings. Latvijas Valsts ceļi also stated that the permitted speed on the section could be increased to 110 km/h (68 mph) from the following season.

In September 2023, reconstruction was completed on the Sēnīte–Sigulda section, km 39.44–46.30. The works rebuilt the left carriageway with three asphalt layers and renewed the Inčupīte and Egļupe culverts, part of the pedestrian tunnel in Gauja village, traffic signs and road markings. Latvijas Valsts ceļi reported that the section had not been fully renewed since its construction in the 1980s. The contract value was €12.36 million, including VAT, of which €10.51 million was co-financed by the Cohesion Fund.

In 2024, safety improvements began on the A2 between the Riga boundary and Garkalne, km 12.41–22.00, including the area of the A1/A2/A4 junction. The works included closing two U-turn locations, changing turning arrangements, rebuilding safety barriers, installing lighting from Riga to the A1/A2/A4 interchange and improving directional signs. In the same year, a noise barrier was built along the A2 by Gauja village, km 40.55–42.50, as part of noise-reduction measures.

In November 2024, reconstruction was completed on the Melturi–Rīdzene section, km 77.24–88.10. The works rebuilt the pavement structure with a frost-resistant layer, crushed-stone base and three asphalt layers, restored drainage, rebuilt 58 culverts, improved bus stops and road equipment, and renewed the parking area near Melturi. The project also rebuilt the historic Lejasgrāvja culvert at km 82.10 while preserving its historical form. The contract value was €15.61 million, including VAT.

== Current and recent works ==
In 2025, works began on the A2 in the Sigulda area from the CSDD/Aerodium area to the Jūdaži/Rūdolfa Blaumaņa street junction, km 46.30–52.09, together with works on local road V96. The project included reconstruction of the A2 from the CSDD/Aerodium area to the railway overpass, construction of a roundabout at Kalna iela near Kaķīškalns, repairs to the Lorupes viaduct and surface renewal on the section from the railway overpass to the Jūdaži/Rūdolfa Blaumaņa street junction.

Traffic on the rebuilt section over the Lorupes viaduct and through the new roundabout was opened on 15 October 2025. Works resumed in May 2026 and were planned to be completed by the end of June 2026. The remaining works included the asphalt wearing course and shoulders between the railway overpass and the Jūdaži/Rūdolfa Blaumaņa street junction, completion of the Kalna iela roundabout branch, renewal of the V96 surface, drainage, landscaping, road signs and markings. The contract value was €6.88 million, including VAT.

In 2025, Latvijas Valsts ceļi also started a large asphalt-renewal project on the A2 in Smiltene municipality, from Grundzāle to Lācupji, km 142.70–182.00. The works covered about 40 km (25 mi) and included pavement renewal, drainage and culvert works, bus-stop improvements, sidewalks in Grundzāle and Vireši, and repairs to four bridges over the Vecpalsa, Gauja, Melnupe and Vaidava rivers.

== Traffic and enforcement ==
Latvijas Valsts ceļi publishes traffic-intensity statistics for state roads as the average number of vehicles per day. Traffic volumes on the A2 are highest on the Riga approach and on the Riga–Sēnīte–Sigulda corridor, and are substantially lower in the rural eastern sections toward Veclaicene.

Average-speed enforcement has been introduced on several A2 sections. On 30 August 2023, an average-speed-control section began operating between the bridge over the Vējupīte in Sigulda and Augšlīgatne, km 54.5–62.3. On 12 March 2026, new average-speed-control sections began operating from Krasta iela in Ieriķi to the P20 junction, km 72.25–77.15, and from Bērzkrogs to the Smiltene roundabout, km 94.8–125.7. The systems also check compulsory vehicle insurance, technical inspection status and road-user-charge compliance.

== Major intersections ==
Road	Location or connection
A 1 / A 4	near Baltezers; connection toward Tallinn, Saulkrasti and the Riga bypass
P 3	near Garkalne
A 3	near Inčukalns; connection toward Valmiera and Valga
P 10	near Inčukalns
P 8	Sigulda
P 32	near Augšlīgatne
P 20	near Melturi; connection toward Cēsis
P 31	near Drabeši
P 30	Bērzkrogs
P 29	near Rauna
P 27	near Smiltene
P 23	near Vireši
P 44	near Līzespasts
P 39	near Ape
E77 / T7	Estonian border near Veclaicene

== Settlements on or near the route ==
- Riga
- Berģi
- Garkalne
- Vangaži
- Gauja
- Sigulda
- Augšlīgatne
- Ieriķi
- Melturi
- Drabeši
- Bērzkrogs
- Grundzāle
- Vireši
- Līzespasts
- Ape
- Veclaicene

== Gallery ==
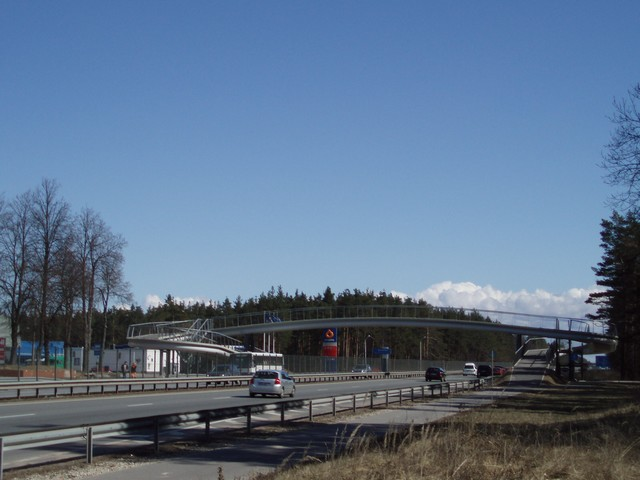
A2 near Berģi.

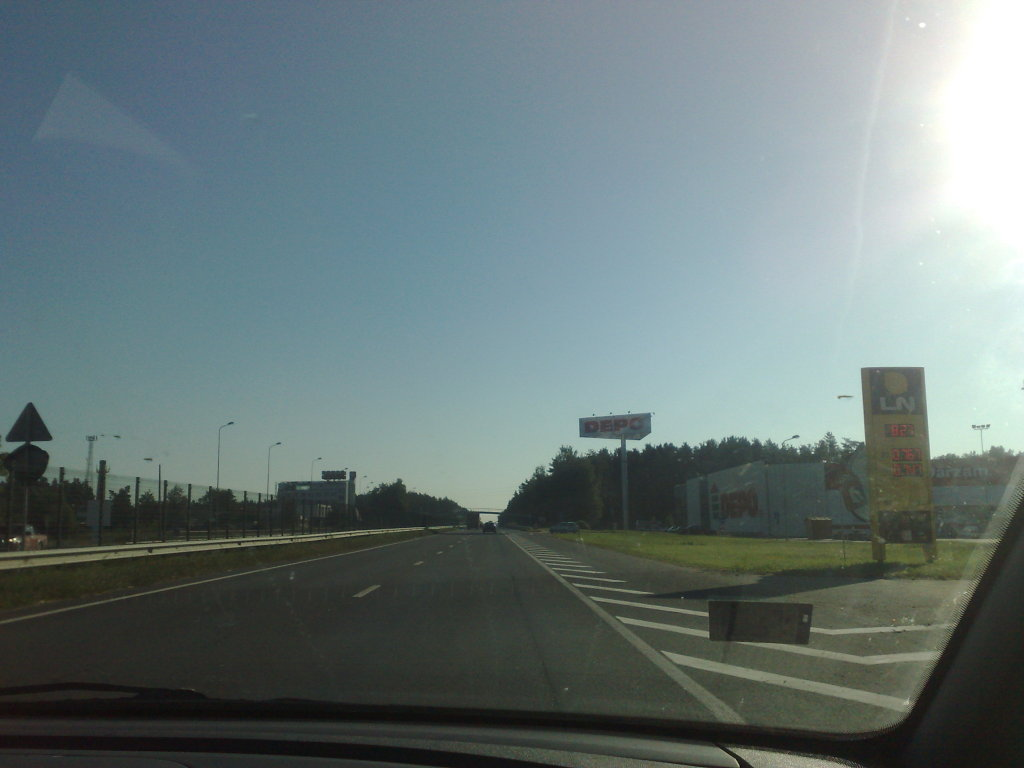
A2 near Berģi.

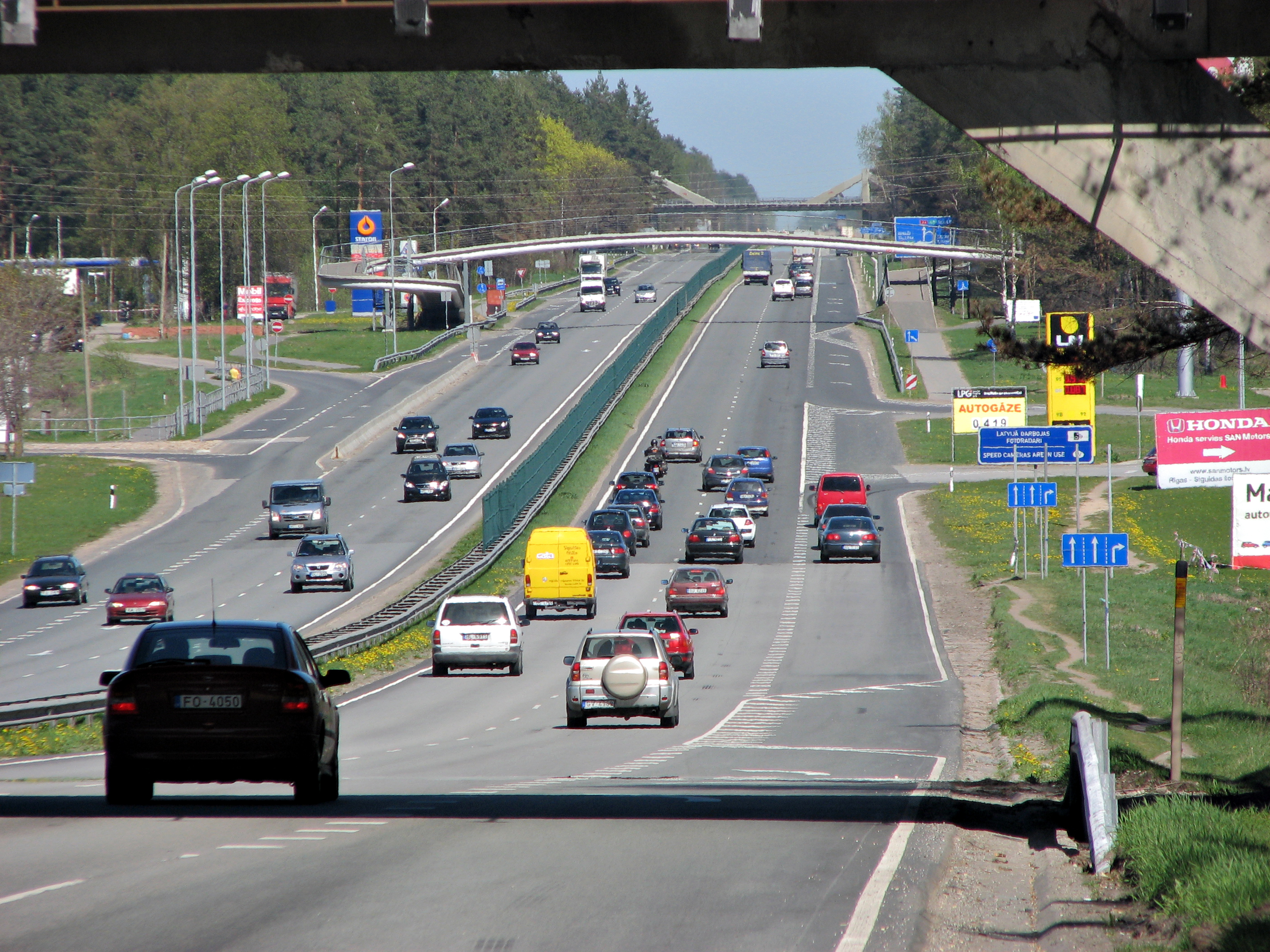
A2 looking from the Riga boundary toward Sigulda.

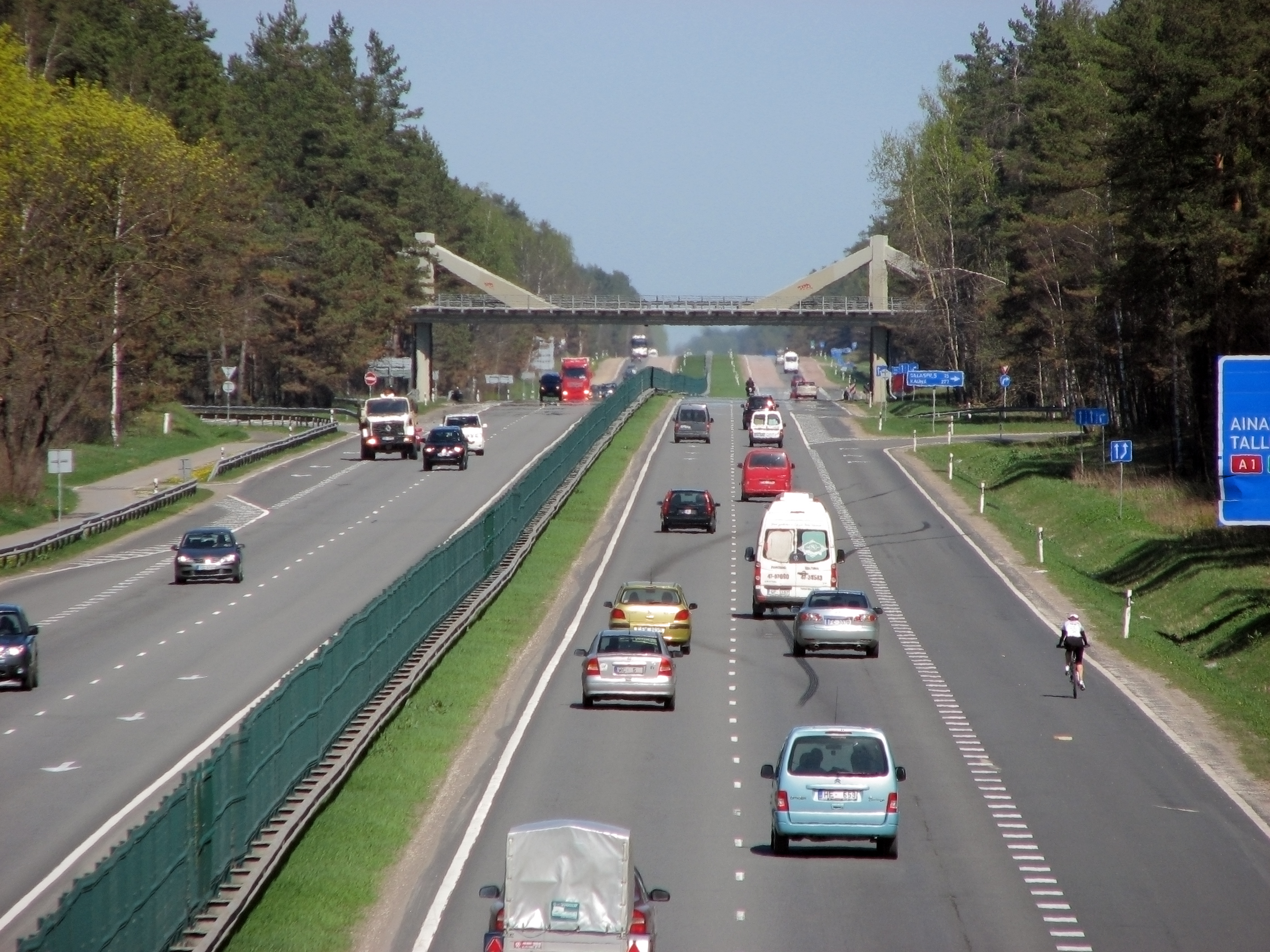
A2 seen from a pedestrian bridge in Berģi.

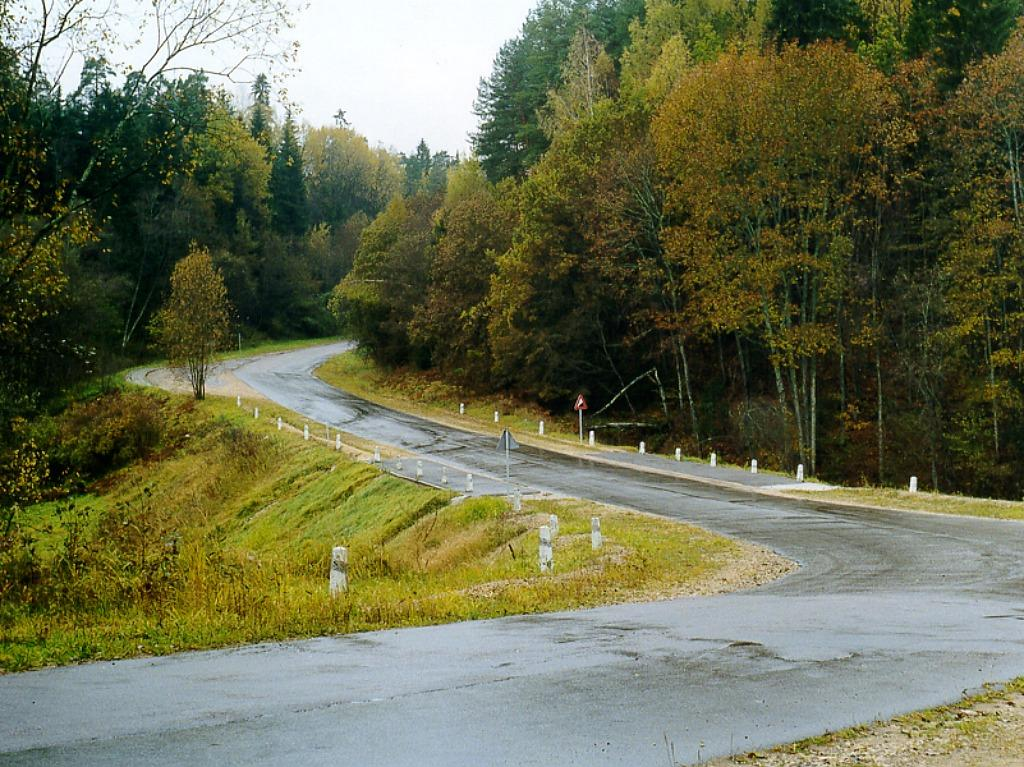
A former A2 alignment in Sigulda, 1998.

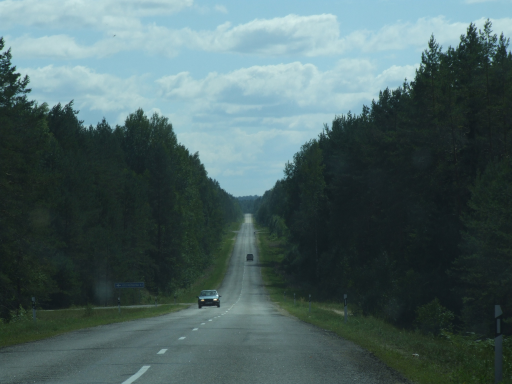
A2 near Ape in 2006.

== See also ==
- Transport in Latvia
- List of national roads in Latvia
- European route E77
- A3 road (Latvia)
