= P30 (Latvia) =

Regional road in Latvia

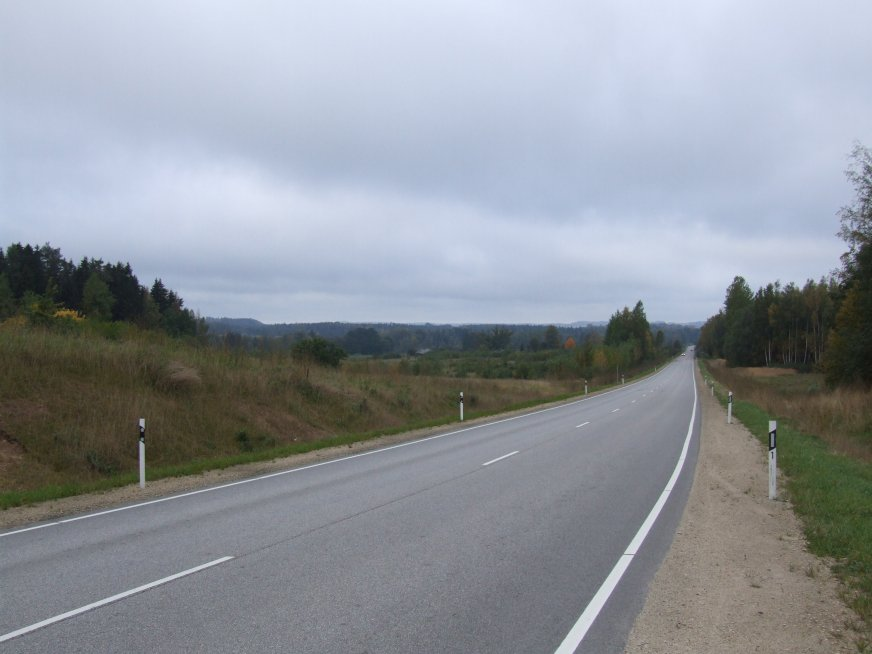
- P30 in Priekuļi Parish

Route information
- Length: 85.7 km (53.3 mi)

Major junctions
- West end: Cēsis
- A 2 at Bērzkrogs; P 33 near Saliņkrogs; P 37 in Madona
- East end: Madona

Location
- Country: Latvia

Highway system
- National Roads in Latvia

The P30 is a regional road in Latvia. It is officially named Cēsis–Vecpiebalga–Madona and connects Cēsis with Vecpiebalga and Madona. The road has a total length of 85.7 km (53.3 mi), of which 81.9 km (50.9 mi) are state-owned and 3.8 km (2.4 mi) are municipal-owned road sections.

The P30 is an important regional link across central Vidzeme, connecting Cēsis and Madona with the A2 at Bērzkrogs. At Bērzkrogs, the road provides access to the A2 corridor toward Riga, Sigulda, Smiltene and the Estonian border near Veclaicene.

== Route description ==
The P30 starts in Cēsis. According to the official route list, the municipal section in Cēsis follows Jāņa Poruka iela. East of Cēsis, the road passes through the rural part of Cēsis Municipality and reaches Bērzkrogs, where it intersects the A2.

From Bērzkrogs, the road continues south-east through the Piebalga area, passing through or near Taurene and Vecpiebalga. East of Vecpiebalga it continues toward Inķēnkalns and the Madona area. The eastern municipal section in Madona follows Raiņa iela.

Most of the P30 is a single-carriageway road with one lane in each direction. The road is paved with asphalt concrete along its full length. Outside built-up areas, the ordinary maximum speed limit is generally 90 km/h (56 mph), unless otherwise signed.

The route also connects with other regional roads in eastern Vidzeme. The P33 route has a coinciding section with the P30, while in Madona the P30 connects with the P37 corridor toward Pļaviņas and Gulbene.

== History and reconstruction ==
Major reconstruction of the P30 was carried out during the 2014–2020 European Regional Development Fund planning period. Latvijas Valsts ceļi listed several P30 sections among the regional road projects co-financed by the European Regional Development Fund. The aim of these projects was to improve technical condition, driving comfort and safety, reduce travel time and extend the service life of asphalt-concrete pavement structures.

The section from the former railway overpass to Brežģa kalns, km 24.60–38.00, was rebuilt between 2015 and 2016. The project covered 13.4 km (8.3 mi) of asphalt pavement and included reconstruction of the road overpass over the former railway line at km 24.80 and reconstruction of the bridge over the Gauja. The total project cost was €9.80 million, including €8.33 million from the European Regional Development Fund. Works began on 23 March 2015 and the object was accepted into service on 10 October 2016.

The following section from Brežģa kalns to Vecpiebalga, km 38.00–49.00, was rebuilt between 2016 and 2017. The project covered 11 km (6.8 mi) of pavement, with total costs of €9.02 million, including €7.66 million from the European Regional Development Fund. Works began on 20 June 2016 and the object was accepted into service on 12 October 2017. The section was officially opened in Vecpiebalga in August 2017. LVC described the previous road condition as very poor, with settlement, ruts, cracks and potholes, and noted that local residents had publicly drawn attention to the road's condition in 2014.

Further reconstruction was carried out from Vecpiebalga to Inķēnkalns, km 49.06–61.13. The project rebuilt 12.07 km (7.50 mi) of the road, with planned total costs of €8.45 million and €7.18 million in European Regional Development Fund financing. Works began on 16 April 2019 and the object was accepted into service on 25 January 2021. LVC reported in September 2020 that the works included new pavement foundations and culverts, two asphalt layers, and removal of settlement caused by a landslide at the 59th kilometre. The works were carried out by AS Trev-2 Grupp for €7.476 million, including VAT, with 85% co-financed by the European Regional Development Fund.

In 2020, pavement-renewal works were also completed on the P30 section from Bērzkrogs to Meļļi, km 14.98–24.62. After settlement repairs and profile correction, the section received surface treatment. The works were carried out by SIA 8 CBR for €264,969, including VAT, financed from the Latvian state budget.

== Recent and planned works ==
In 2025, LVC renewed the pavement on the P30 from the railway overpass to Vecpiebalga, km 24.60–49.04, over a length of about 25 km (16 mi). The works included pothole repairs, local profile and settlement correction, surface treatment along the whole section, periodic maintenance of the railway overpass at the beginning of the section, renewal of road equipment, replacement of damaged traffic signs and new road markings. The works were carried out by SIA Limbažu ceļi for €783,528, including VAT, financed from the Latvian state budget.

In February 2026, temporary speed restrictions were introduced on parts of the same section, km 24.60–49.04, because of surface-treatment defects after the 2025 works. LVC stated that loose chippings had separated from the surface in some places after winter weather and traffic, and that the contractor would repair the defects at its own expense when weather conditions allowed.

In 2026, LVC announced and awarded a procurement for renewal of the P30 from Vecpiebalga to Inķēnkalns, km 49.042–61.130, and from Inķēnkalns toward Madona, km 61.130–83.916. The procurement, identified as LVC 2026/09/AC, was announced on 4 February 2026, had the status "contract concluded" in the Electronic Procurement System, and covered road-surface construction works with a planned contract duration of 120 days.

== Traffic and enforcement ==
Latvijas Valsts ceļi publishes traffic-intensity statistics for state roads as the average number of vehicles per day.

Average-speed enforcement has been introduced on the P30. On 30 August 2023, an average-speed-control section began operating from Jaunkleķeri to Krustakrogs, km 22.1–29.0. The system checks average speed and also verifies compulsory vehicle insurance and technical inspection status.

== Major intersections ==
Road	Location or connection
P 20	Cēsis; connection toward Valmiera and Drabeši
A 2	Bērzkrogs; connection toward Riga, Sigulda, Smiltene and the Estonian border near Veclaicene
P 33	connection toward Ērgļi and Jaunpiebalga
P 37	Madona; connection toward Pļaviņas and Gulbene

== Settlements on or near the route ==
- Cēsis
- Priekuļi Parish
- Bērzkrogs
- Taurene
- Vecpiebalga
- Inķēnkalns
- Madona

== Gallery ==
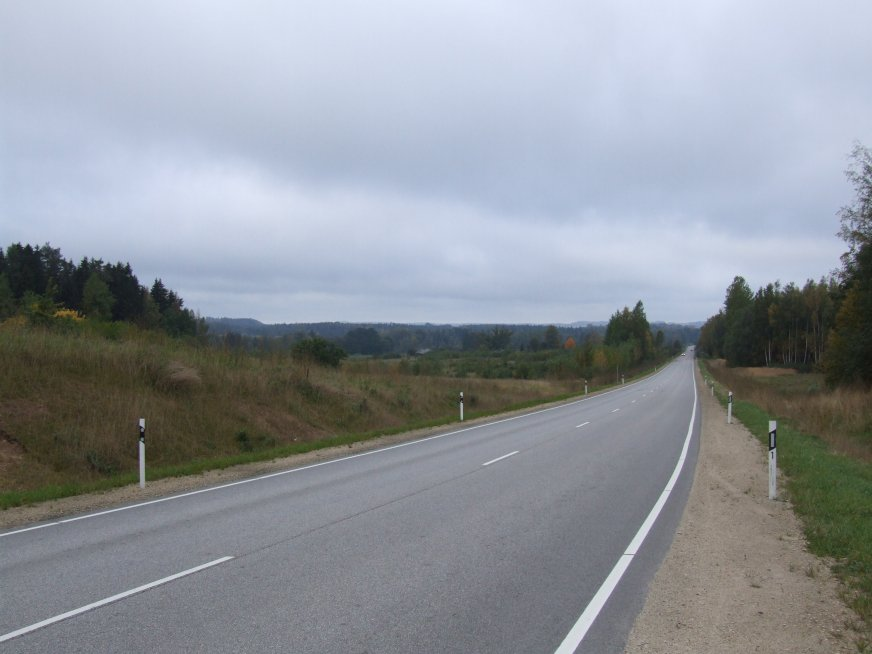
P30 in Priekuļi Parish.

== See also ==
- Transport in Latvia
- List of National Roads in Latvia
- A2 road (Latvia)
- P37 road (Latvia)
