= A3 road (Latvia) =

Road in Latvia

Coordinates: 57.474354°N 25.28413°E

A3
- Valmieras šoseja

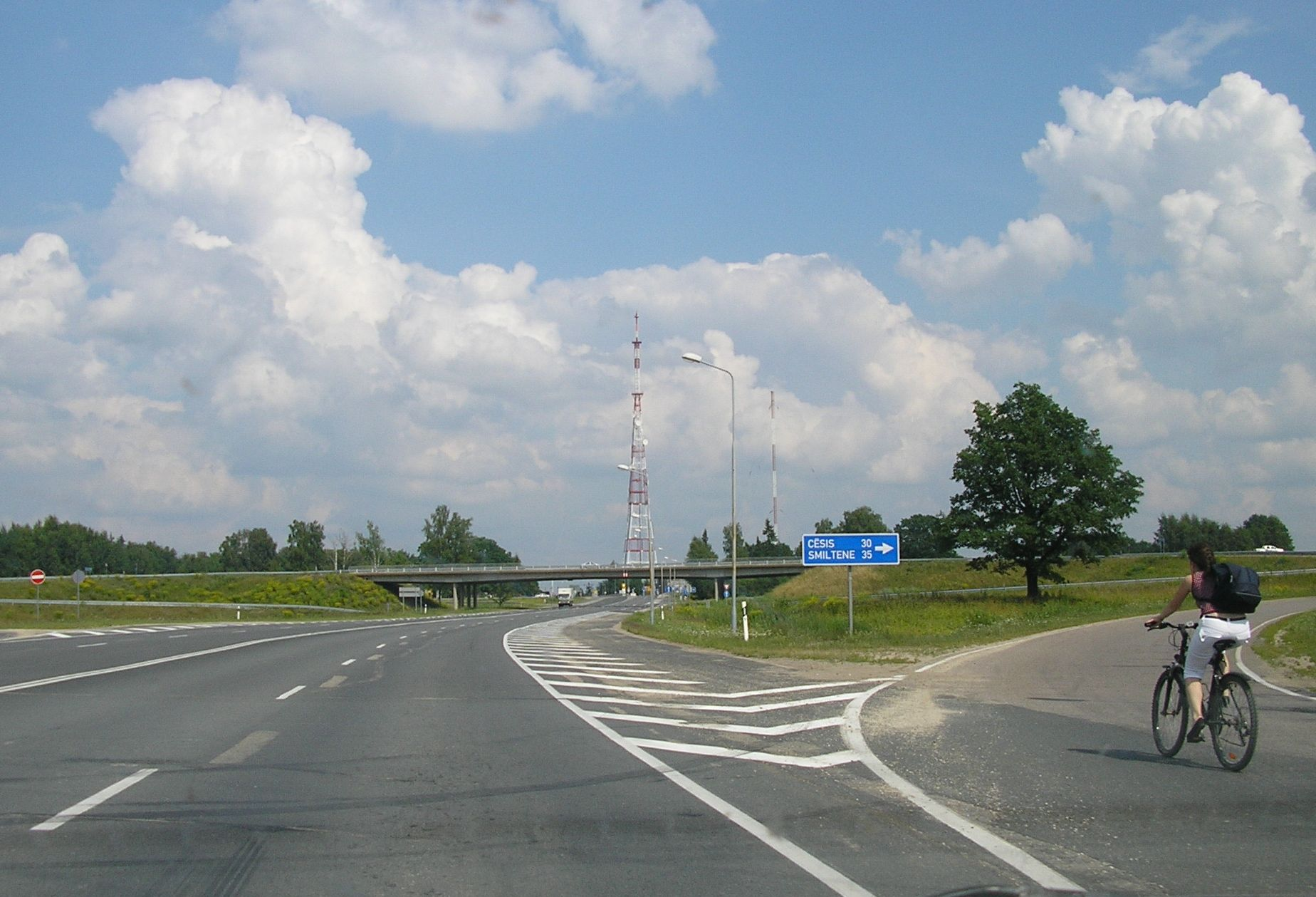
- A3 near the Valmiera bypass

Route information
- Part of E264
- Length: 123.7 km (76.9 mi)

Major junctions
- South-west end: A 2 near Inčukalns
- P 10 near Murjāņi; P 7 in Ragana; P 9 in Ragana; P 8 near Inciems; P 14 near Stalbe; P 11 near Valmiera; P 18 near Valmiera; P 16 near Valmiera; P 17 near Valmiera; P 25 near Strenči
- North-east end: Valka / Estonia border E264 / T3

Location
- Country: Latvia

Highway system
- National Roads in Latvia
← A 2	→ A 4

The A3 is a main national road in Latvia. It is officially named Inčukalns–Valmiera–Igaunijas robeža (Valka) and connects the A2 near Inčukalns with Valmiera, Valka and the Estonian border. The road is commonly known as the Valmiera Highway (Valmieras šoseja). It has a total length of 123.7 km (76.9 mi), of which 113.1 km (70.3 mi) are state-owned and 10.6 km (6.6 mi) are municipal-owned road sections.

The A3 forms part of European route E264 and Latvia's TEN-T road network. At the Estonian border, the road continues as European route E264 and Estonian national road 3 toward Tartu and Jõhvi.

== Route description ==
The A3 starts at the A2 near Inčukalns, at the Sēnīte junction, and runs north and north-east through Vidzeme. The road passes through or near Murjāņi, Ragana, Inciems, Straupe, Stalbe, Kocēni, Valmiera, Strenči and Valka before reaching the Estonian border.

The road provides one of the main connections between the Riga area, Valmiera and northern Vidzeme. It also serves the Gauja National Park area, with sections of the route running through or along the park's road-access corridor between the Riga region and Valmiera.

Most of the A3 is a single-carriageway road with one lane in each direction. The route is paved with asphalt concrete along its full length. Outside built-up areas, the ordinary maximum speed limit is generally 90 km/h (56 mph), unless otherwise signed.

The A3 bypasses Valmiera, one of Latvia's largest cities, with access to the city provided by regional roads and junctions around the Valmiera bypass. According to the official route list, the A3 includes municipal sections in Strenči and Valka. In Strenči the route follows Rīgas iela and Valkas iela, while in Valka it follows Rīgas iela, Zemgales iela, Burtnieku iela, Parka iela, Varoņu iela and Rūjienas iela.

== History and reconstruction ==
Large parts of the A3 have been reconstructed or resurfaced since the early 2010s. In 2013, the A3 section between km 1.65 and 26.90 was reconstructed; Latvijas Valsts ceļi later noted that this section was the runner-up in the 2013 Autoceļu Avīze road-object-of-the-year award.

In 2014, reconstruction began on the A3 between km 48.5 and 60.2. The works included reconstruction of the asphalt pavement, improvement of property accesses, public-transport stops, ditches and culverts, and laying of a new asphalt surface course. The contract value was reported as €5.18 million, excluding VAT.

In 2016, works were carried out on the Rubene–Mellupe bridge section, km 60.20–79.45. The project included works connected with the P18 overpass over the A3 near Valmiera and was co-financed from the Cohesion Fund.

In 2017, repairs were completed on three A3 sections between Strenči and Valka, between km 100.9 and 113.5. The works included profile correction, asphalt milling, a levelling layer, surface treatment, repairs to accesses and eight bus stops. The total cost was €1.75 million, including VAT.

== Recent improvements ==
In 2021, acoustic rumble strips were installed on the A3 between Ragana and Valmiera, km 9.26–65.22, excluding built-up sections in Straupe, Plācis and Stalbe. The works were intended to improve road safety by warning drivers when a vehicle leaves its lane.

In 2021, a pedestrian and cycling path was also built along the A3 in Murjāņi, from the bridge over the Gauja to the junction with local road V79, km 1.6–4.3. The project provided a safer route for pedestrians and cyclists and included lighting and a route under the bridge over the Gauja.

In 2022, Latvijas Valsts ceļi carried out pavement-renewal works on two A3 sections: from the Silaunieki quarry to the Tīģeļu stream, km 48.47–60.21, and from the Mellupe bridge to Strenči, km 79.40–89.14.

In 2023, pavement renewal was carried out on the beginning of the A3 from the bridge over the Gauja to the bridge over the Brasla, km 1.6–26.89. The works included asphalt levelling milling, a new asphalt wearing course, an acoustic rumble strip, repairs to culverts, an animal tunnel and the bridge over the Brasla, as well as maintenance of 425 trees along the road.

== Long-term planning and tourism corridor ==
There are no confirmed current plans to widen the A3 to a dual carriageway. However, the road is included in Latvia's wider long-term state-road development planning. Latvijas Valsts ceļi's road-development strategy to 2040 sets out long-term goals for the main state-road network, including safer and more efficient links between Riga, regional centres and the main international corridors.

The A3 is also the main axis of the Via Hanseatica tourism and transport corridor in northern Latvia. The Vidzeme Planning Region has described the A3 as the corridor's principal road axis and has studied improvements to transport infrastructure, services and information along the corridor, including links between Riga, the Gauja National Park area, Valmiera and southern Estonia.

== Traffic and enforcement ==
Latvijas Valsts ceļi publishes traffic-intensity statistics for state roads as the average number of vehicles per day. In the 2024 dataset, the unweighted average of the listed A3 section values was 6,527 vehicles per day. In the 2025 dataset, the unweighted average of the listed A3 section values was 6,628 vehicles per day, with section values ranging from 2,065 to 11,014 vehicles per day.

Average-speed enforcement has been introduced on several A3 sections. On 8 September 2023, an average-speed-control section began operating between the Plācis–Rozula road junction and Stalbe, km 36.3–38.7. On 12 March 2026, another average-speed-control section began operating between Stalbe and Rubene, km 40.1–55.6. The systems also check compulsory vehicle insurance, technical inspection status and road-user-charge compliance.

== Major intersections ==
Road	Location or connection
A 2	near Inčukalns; connection toward Riga, Sigulda and the Estonian border at Veclaicene
P 10	near Murjāņi
P 7	Ragana
P 9	Ragana
P 8	near Inciems
P 14	Stalbe
P 11	near Valmiera
P 18	near Valmiera
P 16	near Valmiera
P 17	near Valmiera
P 25	Strenči
E264 / T3	Estonian border; continuation toward Tartu and Jõhvi

== Settlements on or near the route ==
- Inčukalns
- Murjāņi
- Ragana
- Inciems
- Straupe
- Stalbe
- Kocēni
- Valmiera
- Strenči
- Valka

== Gallery ==
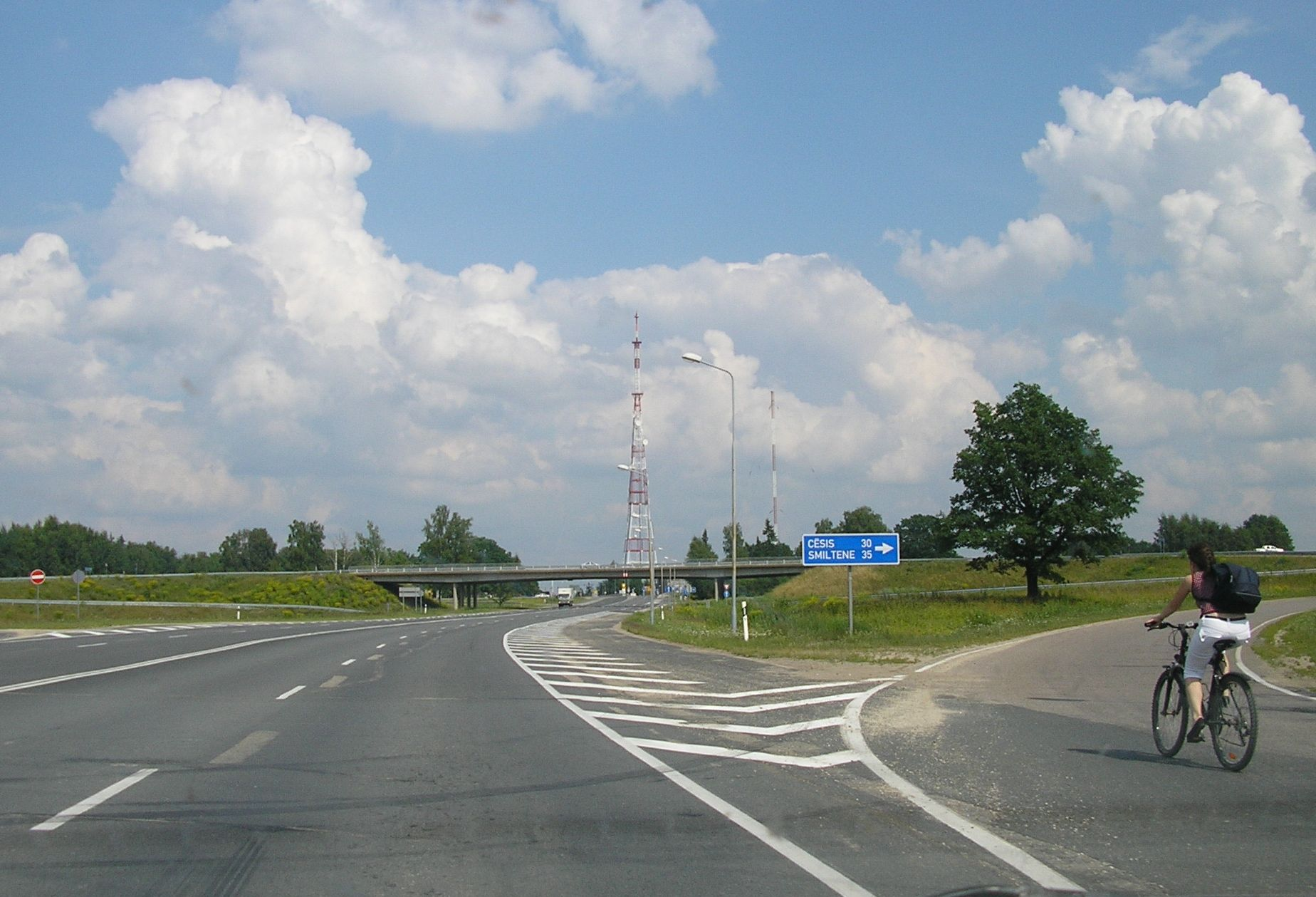
A3 near the Valmiera bypass.

== See also ==
- Transport in Latvia
- List of National Roads in Latvia
- European route E264
- Estonian national road 3
- Via Hanseatica
