= European Transport Corridors =

European Transport Corridors may refer to:

- Core Network Corridors of the Trans-European Transport Network
- Pan-European corridors, a related but distinct network
