= E264 =

E264 can refer to:

- European route E264, a European route
- Ammonium acetate, a chemical compound
