= Ragana =

Ragana may refer to:

- Ragana (band), an American black metal duo
- Ragana (moth), a genus of moths
- Ragana, Latvia, a village in Sigulda Municipality, Latvia
- Ragana (mythology), a mythical being in Latvian mythology and Lithuanian mythology, a witch

== People with the surname ==
- Šatrijos Ragana (1877–1930), Lithuanian writer
