= Riga–Lugaži Railway =

Railway in Latvia

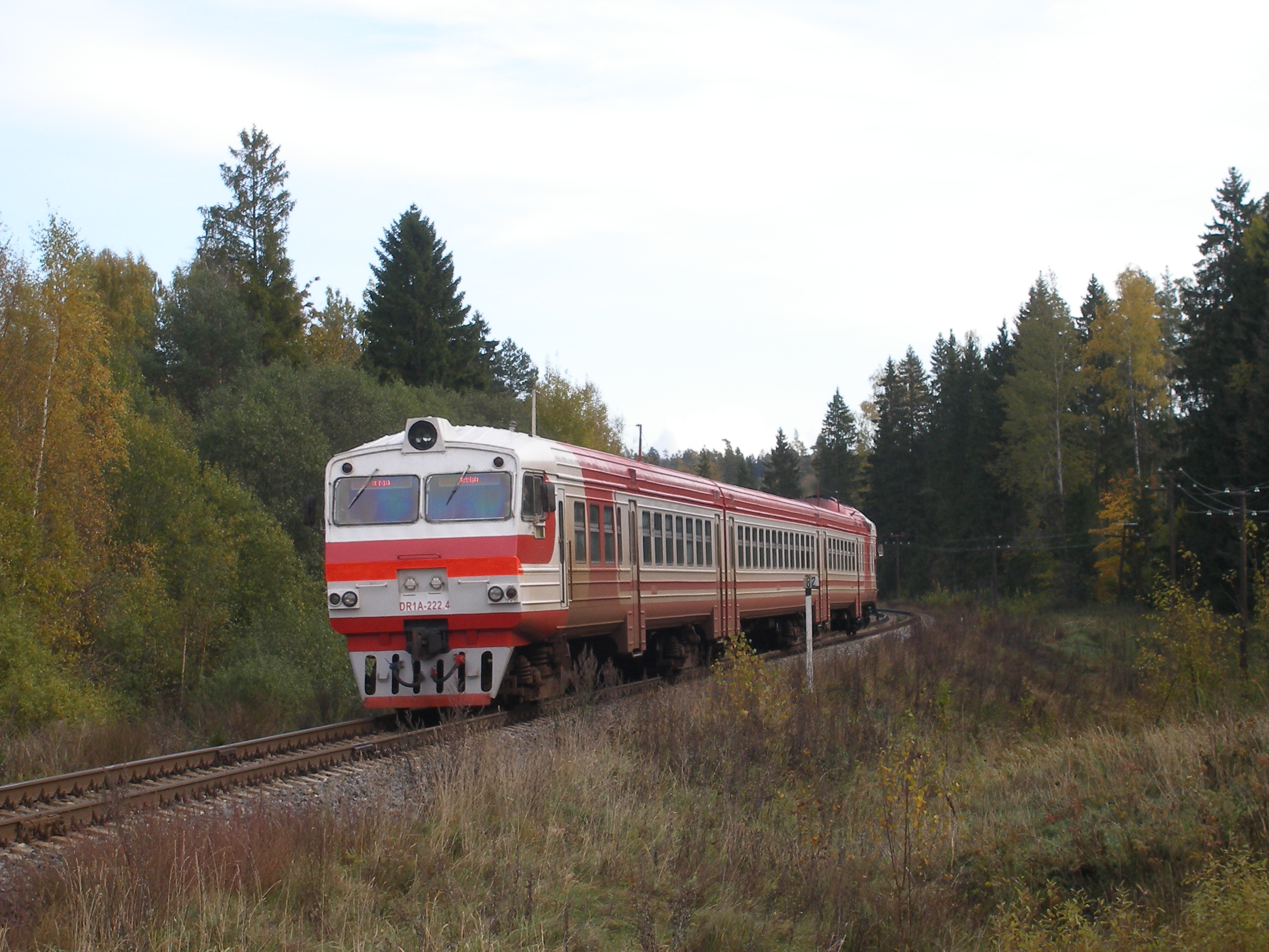
- Riga–Valga train between Melturi and Āraiši stations in 2009

Overview
- Other names: Riga –Valga; Riga – Lugaži – State Border
- Native name: Dzelzceļa līnija Rīga—Lugaži
- Termini: Riga 56.947222°N 24.122222°E; Lugaži 57.753138°N 26.001206°E

Service
- Operator(s): Latvian Railways

History
- Opened: 1889

Technical
- Line length: 166 km (103.15 mi)
- Track gauge: 1,524 mm (5 ft)

The Riga—Lugaži Railway (also known as Riga–Valga and Riga–Lugaži–State Border; Latvian: Rīga—Lugaži—valsts robeža) is a 166 kilometres (103 mi) long, 1,524 mm (5 ft) gauge railway in Latvia. It was built in the late 19th century (commencing in 1886) to connect the cities of Riga and Saint Petersburg via Valga and Pskov. The railway was opened in 1889.

The final station in Latvia is Lugaži (near Valka). The railway was last used for the Riga–Saint Petersburg service in 1998, after which St Petersburg trains operated via Rēzekne. For several years there were no cross-border services, and trains terminated at Lugaži, but since 2008 a regular passenger service again operates from Riga to Valga in Estonia twice a day, with an onward connection to Tallinn via a train in Estonia.

During the COVID-19 pandemic, the Riga-Lugaži railway cut services to Valga, with trains ending in Lugaži. Ordinary service was restored in May 2020.

On 15 December 2024, a new station stop, Šmerlis, was opened between Čiekurkalns and Jugla stations. Starting from 15 December 2024, the passenger carrier "Vivi" adjusted the departure time of the Riga-Valga diesel train to the arrival time of the Lithuanian "LTG Link" diesel train Vilnius-Riga. In turn, from 6 January 2025, the arrival time of the Riga-Valga diesel train was adjusted to the departure time of the Estonian "Elron" diesel train Valga-Tartu-Tallinn, with a transfer time of approximately 20 minutes. Starting 10 February 2025, the Latvian carrier "Vivi" provides passenger transportation from Riga to Valga and back with a modern "PESA 730 ML" diesel train leased from the Lithuanian carrier "LTG Link", thus making transportation more comfortable for passengers on this section, as well as reducing the number of transfers, maintaining the transfer only in Valga. On 5 January 2026, the international train Tallinn–Tartu–Riga resumed service. From 12 January, the train will depart from Tallinn every day at 14:50, from Tartu at 17:05, arriving at Riga Central Station at 20:46. The train from Riga to Tartu and Tallinn will depart every day at 7:38, from Tartu at 11:45, arriving in Tallinn at 13:57, in Latvia the train will stop in Zemitāni, Sigulda, Cēsis and Valmiera.

== Stations ==
Station	Named for	Locale
Rīga	Riga	Riga
Zemitāni	Jorģis Zemitāns	Riga
Čiekurkalns	Čiekurkalns, Riga	Riga
Šmerlis	Šmerlis Forest	Riga
Jugla	Jugla, Riga	Riga
Baltezers (former)	Baltezers	Ropaži Municipality
Garkalne	Garkalne, Garkalne Parish	Ropaži Municipality
Krievupe	Krievupe River	Ropaži Municipality
Vangaži	Vangaži	Ropaži Municipality
Inčukalns	Inčukalns	Ropaži Municipality
Egļupe	Egļupe, Inčukalns Parish	Sigulda Municipality
Silciems (former)	unclear/nearby Silciems Quarry	Sigulda Municipality
Sigulda	Sigulda	Sigulda Municipality
Līgatne	Līgatne	Cēsis Municipality
Ieriķi	Ieriķi	Cēsis Municipality
Melturi	Melturi	Cēsis Municipality
Āraiši	Āraiši	Cēsis Municipality
Cēsis	Cēsis	Cēsis Municipality
Jāņmuiža	Jāņmuiža, Priekuļi Parish	Cēsis Municipality
Lode	AS Lode brickworks	Valmiera Municipality
Bāle (former)	Bāļi homestead	Valmiera Municipality
Valmiera	Valmiera	Valmiera Municipality
Brenguļi (former)	Brenguļi	Valmiera Municipality
Strenči	Strenči	Valmiera Municipality
Seda (former)	Seda, Latvia	Valmiera Municipality
Saule (former)	Saule, Valka Parish	Valka Municipality
Lugaži	Lugaži	Valka Municipality
Valga	Valga	Estonia (Valga County)

== Gallery ==
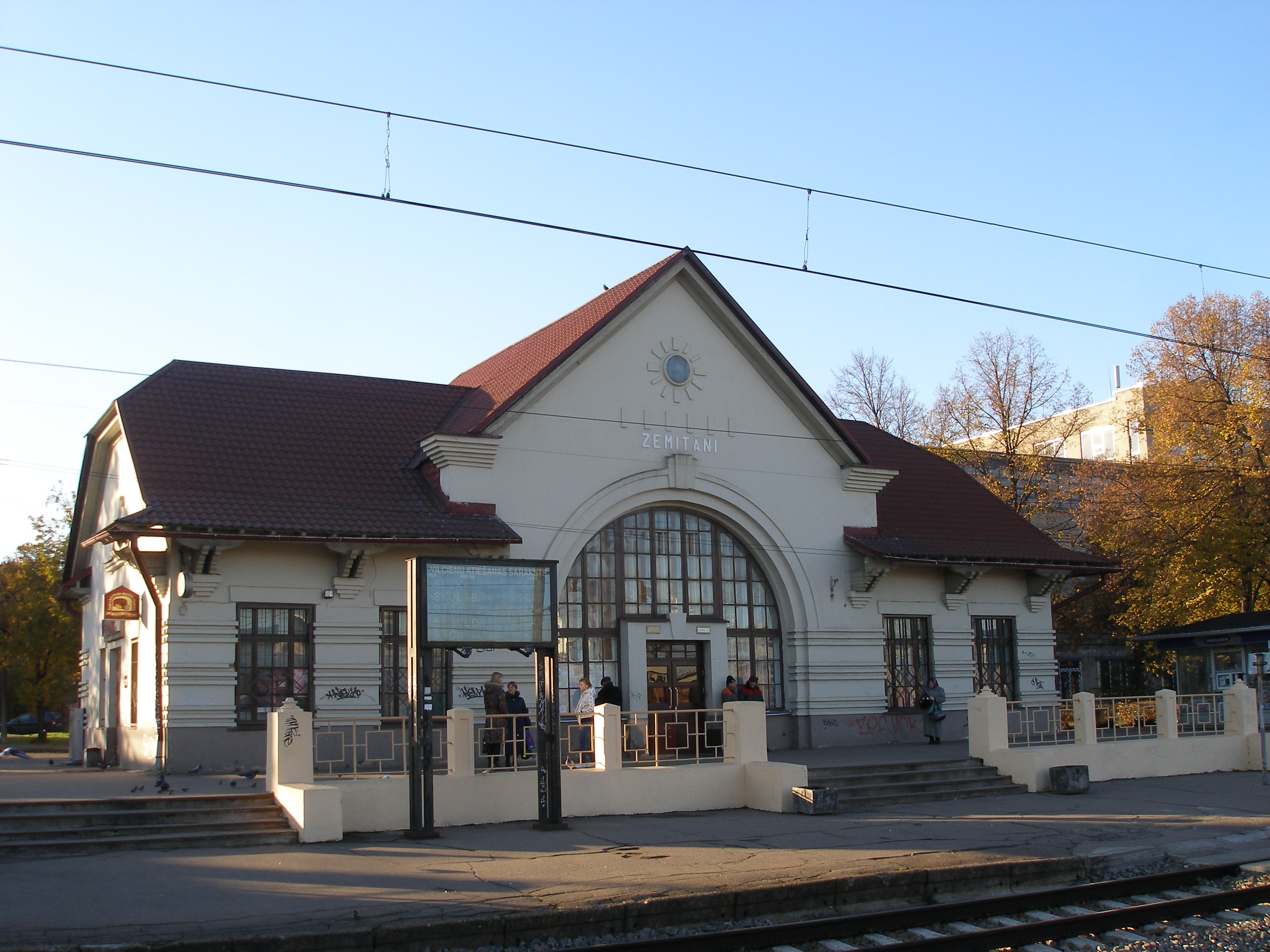
Zemitāni Railway Station

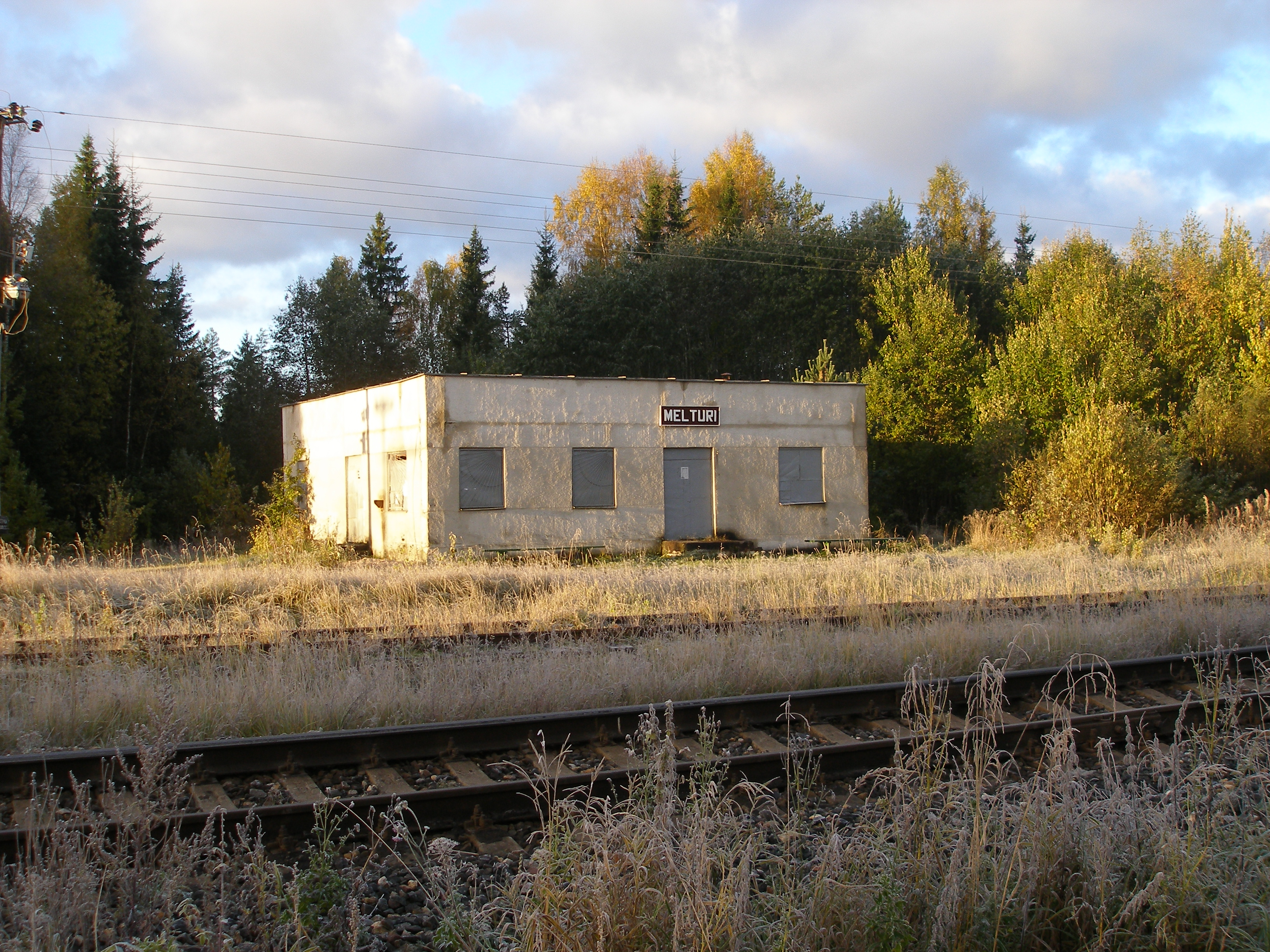
Melturi stop

== See also ==
Railway lines in Latvia in 2016.

- Rail transport in Latvia
- History of rail transport in Latvia
