= Pan-European corridors =

EU road, rail and waterway investment priority areas

Partial map of the ten Pan-European transport corridors.

The ten Pan-European transport corridors were defined at the second Pan-European transport Conference in Crete, March 1994, as routes in Central and Eastern Europe that required major investment over the next ten to fifteen years. Additions were made at the third conference in Helsinki in 1997. Therefore, these corridors are sometimes referred to as the "Crete corridors" or "Helsinki corridors", regardless of their geographical locations.

These development corridors are distinct from the Trans-European transport networks, which is a European Union project and include all major established routes in the European Union, although there are proposals to combine the two systems, since most of the involved countries now are members of the EU.

The corridors variously encompass road, rail and waterway routes.

| I | (North-South) Helsinki - Tallinn - Riga - Kaunas and Klaipėda - Warsaw and Gdańsk: Branch A (Via Hanseatica/E264) - St. Petersburg to Riga to Kaliningrad to Gdańsk to Lübeck; Branch B (Via Baltica/E67, Rail Baltica) - Helsinki to Warsaw. |
| II | (East-West) Berlin - Poznań - Warsaw - Brest - Minsk - Smolensk - Moscow - Nizhny Novgorod |
| III | (East-West) Dresden - Wrocław - Katowice - Kraków - Lviv - Kyiv: Branch A - Berlin - Wrocław |
| IV | Dresden/Nuremberg - Prague - Vienna - Bratislava - Győr - Budapest - Arad - Bucharest - Constanța / Craiova - Sofia - Thessaloniki / Plovdiv - Istanbul. |
| V | (East-West) Venice - Trieste/Koper - Ljubljana - Maribor - Budapest - Uzhhorod - Lviv - Kyiv. 1,600 km (994 mi) long.: Branch A - Bratislava - Žilina - Košice - Uzhhorod; Branch B - Rijeka - Zagreb - Budapest; Branch C - Ploče - Sarajevo - Osijek - Budapest |
| VI | (North-South) Gdańsk - Katowice - Žilina, with a western branch Katowice-Brno. |
| VII | (The Danube River) (Northwest-Southeast) - 2,300 km (1,429 mi) long. |
| VIII | (East-West)Durrës - Elbasan - Skopje - Sofia - Plovdiv - Burgas - Varna. 1,500 km (932 mi) long. |
| IX | (North-South) Helsinki - Vyborg - St. Petersburg - Pskov - Gomel - Kyiv - Liubashivka - Chișinău - Bucharest - Dimitrovgrad - Alexandroupolis. 3,400 km (2,113 mi) long. Major sub-alignment: St. Petersburg - Moscow - Kyiv.: Branch A - Klaipėda - Vilnius - Minsk - Gomel; Branch B - Kaliningrad - Vilnius - Minsk - Gomel; Branch C - Liubashivka - Rozdilna - Odessa |
| X | (North-South) Salzburg - Ljubljana - Zagreb - Beograd - Niš - Skopje - Veles - Thessaloniki. 2,300 km (1,429 mi) long.: Branch A: Graz - Maribor - Zagreb; Branch B: Budapest - Novi Sad - Belgrade; Branch C: Niš - Sofia - Plovdiv - Dimitrovgrad - Istanbul via Corridor IV; Branch D: Veles - Prilep - Bitola - Florina - Igoumenitsa |

== See also ==
- European long-distance paths
- International E-road network
