= Kikkajärv =

Lake in Estonia

- Latvian: Ilgājs
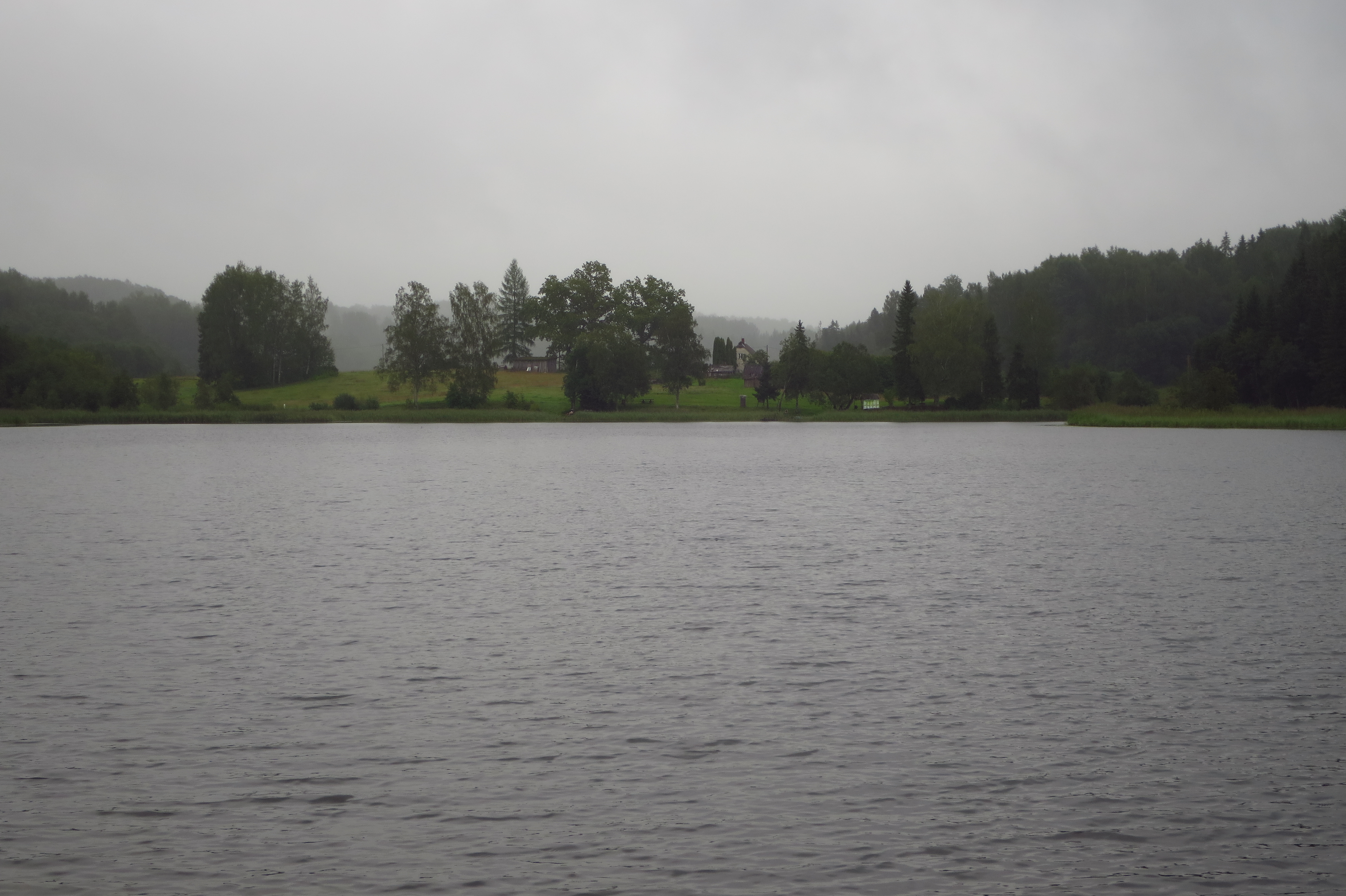
- Kikkajärv seen from Paganamaa, Estonia

- Location within Estonia Location within Latvia
- Location: Rõuge Parish in Estonia and Veclaicene Parish in Latvia
- Coordinates: 57°35′27″N 26°51′03″E
- Basin countries: Estonia, Latvia
- Max. length: 960 meters (3,150 ft)
- Max. width: 300 meters (980 ft)
- Surface area: 20.5 hectares (51 acres)
- Average depth: 11.7 meters (38 ft)
- Max. depth: 22.5 meters (74 ft)
- Shore length^{1}: 2,520 meters (8,270 ft)
- Surface elevation: 127.5 meters (418 ft)
- ^{1} Shore length is not a well-defined measure.

Kikkajärv (also Kika järv, Suur-Kikkajärv) or Ilgājs as it is known in Latvia, is a lake on the border between Estonia and Latvia. Most of the lake lies in the Estonian village of Paganamaa in Rõuge Parish, Võru County. The lake is in the Veclaicene Protected Landscape Area. The nearest settlement to the lake in Latvia is Korneti in Alūksne Municipality.

== Physical description ==
The lake has an area of 20.5 hectares (51 acres). The lake has an average depth of 11.7 meters (38 ft) and a maximum depth of 22.5 meters (74 ft). It is 960 meters (3,150 ft) long, and its shoreline measures 2,520 meters (8,270 ft).

== See also ==
- List of lakes of Estonia
