= Skrudaliena Parish =

Parish of Latvia

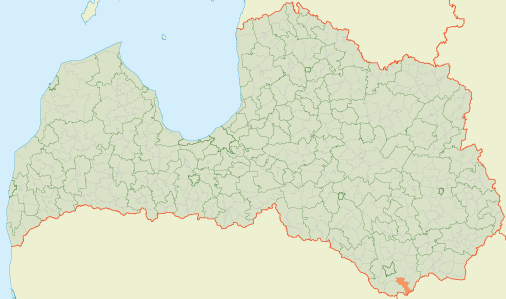
- 55°45′45″N 26°44′26″E

- Location within Latvia
- Country: Latvia, Second Polish Republic

Area
  - Total: 99.53 km^{2} (38.43 sq mi)
  - Land: 91.45 km^{2} (35.31 sq mi)
  - Water: 8.08 km^{2} (3.12 sq mi)

Population (1 January 2026)
  - Total: 879
  - Density: 9.61/km^{2} (24.9/sq mi)
- Website: skrudaliena.lv

Skrudaliena Parish (Latvian: Skrudalienas pagasts) is an administrative unit of Augšdaugava Municipality in the Selonia region of Latvia.

== Towns, villages and settlements ==
- Skrudaliena

== Border with Belarus ==
On 2026 August 10, in the Skrudaliena Parish, Latvian border guards discovered an underground tunnel leading from Belarus, marking the first time such a method has been used for illegal border crossing into Latvia. Operating on prior intelligence, authorities intercepted 15 individuals who had illegally crossed the border through the passage, located 10 meters from the border fence. The individuals were prevented from entering and returned to their country of origin under the State Border Guard Law. In response to the incident and ongoing hybrid threats, Latvian authorities, including the State Border Guard, National Armed Forces, and State Police, launched operation "Vilkatis" to enhance border security and counter cross-border violations.

== Gallery ==
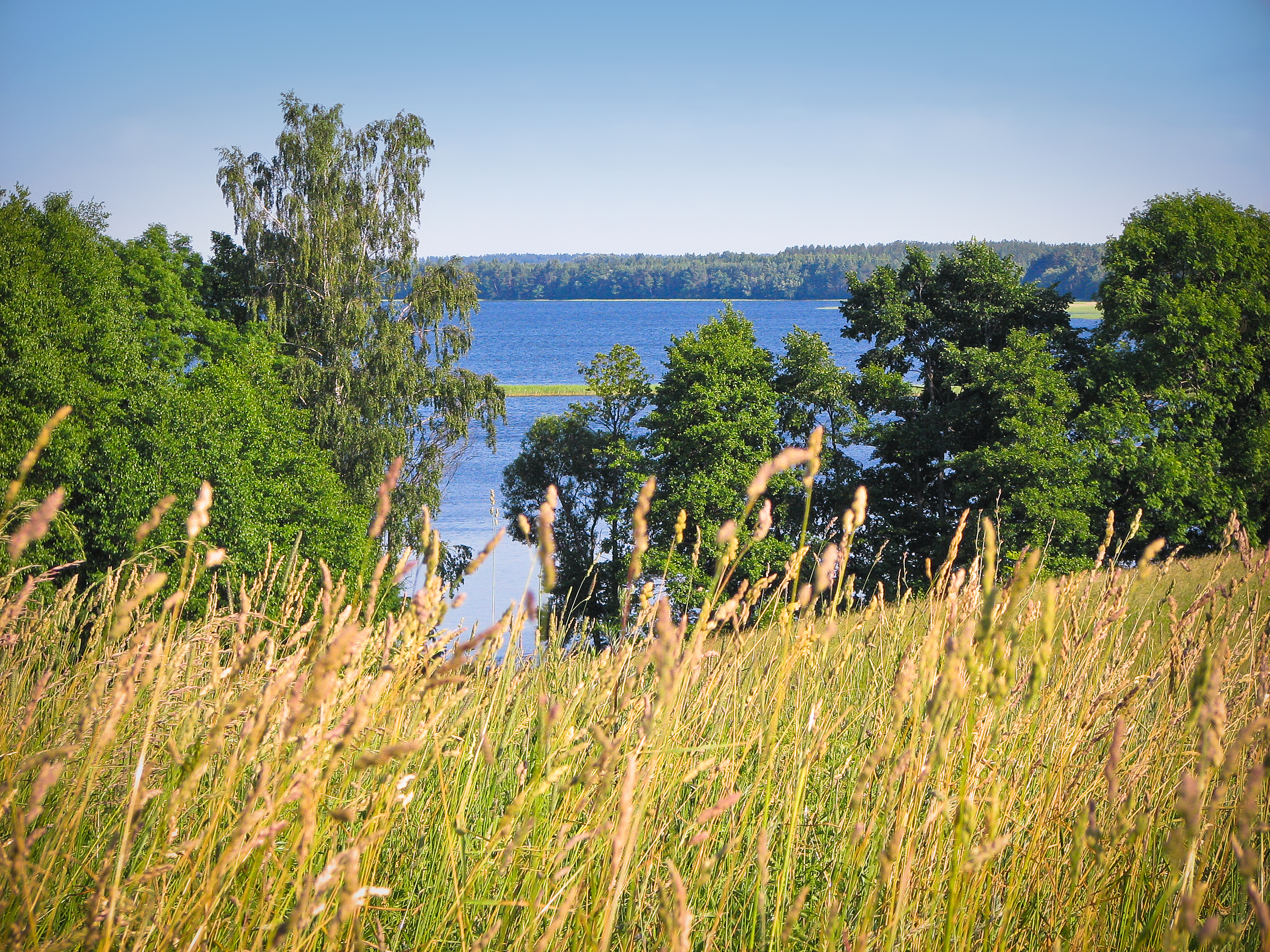
Lake Rychy on the border of Latvia and Belarus

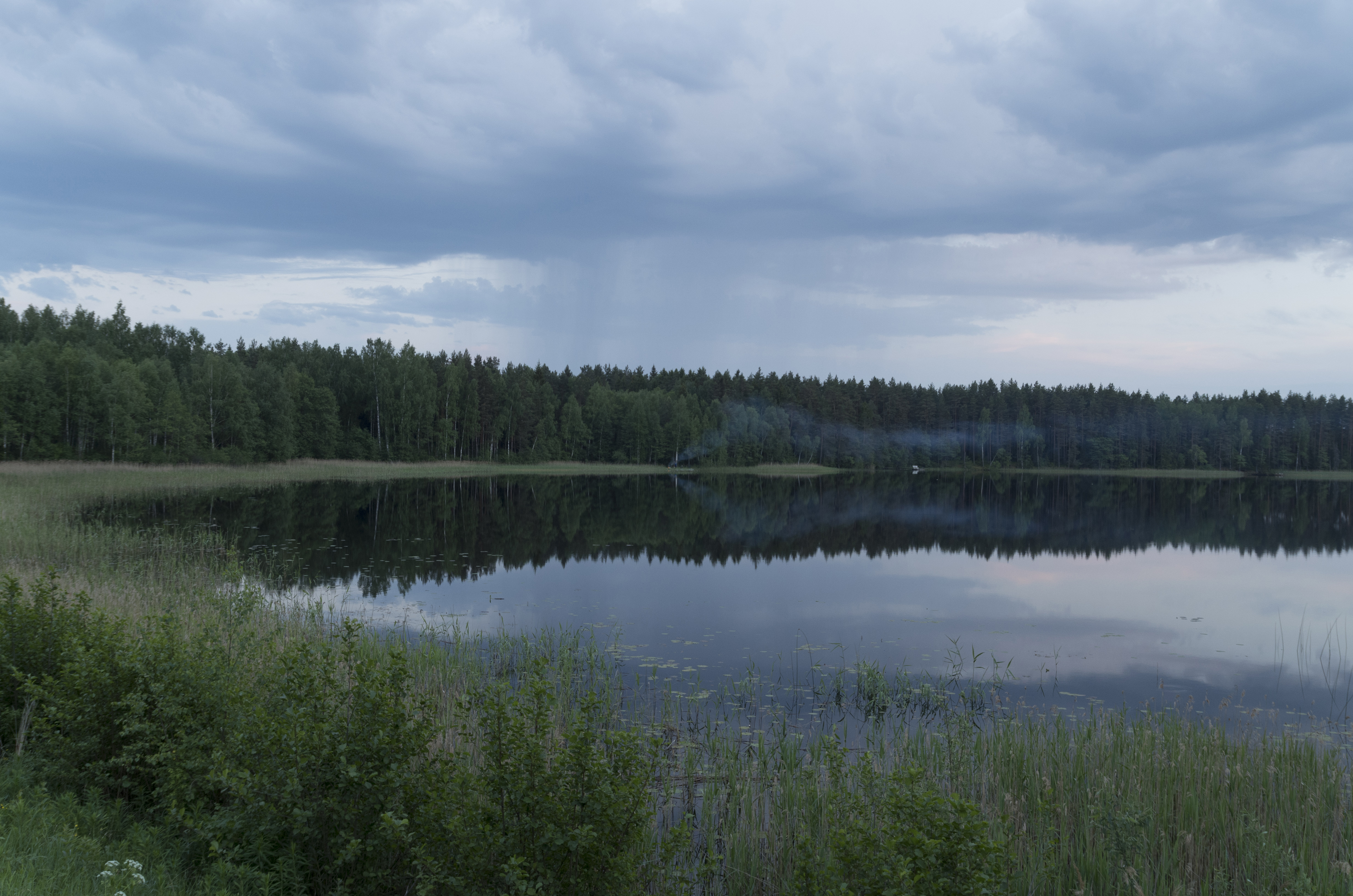
Silene nature park, Smiļģiņa lake

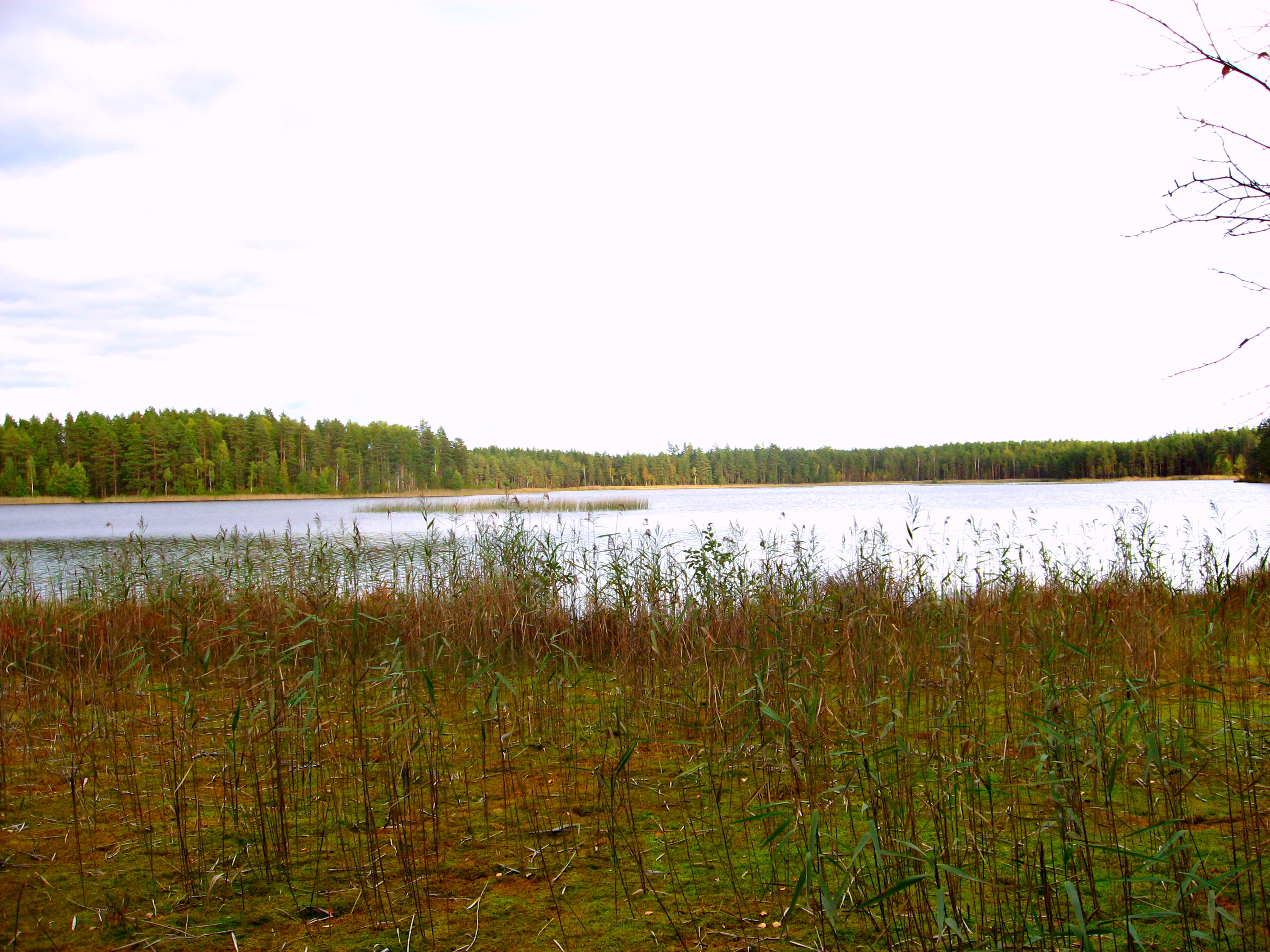
