= Krimulda Municipality =

Municipality of Latvia

Coordinates: 57°12′53″N 24°46′14″E

Krimulda Municipality Krimuldas novads
- Municipality
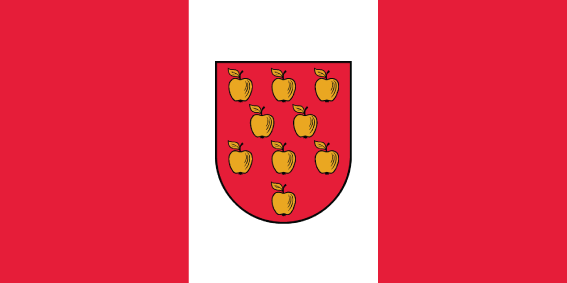
- Flag Coat of arms

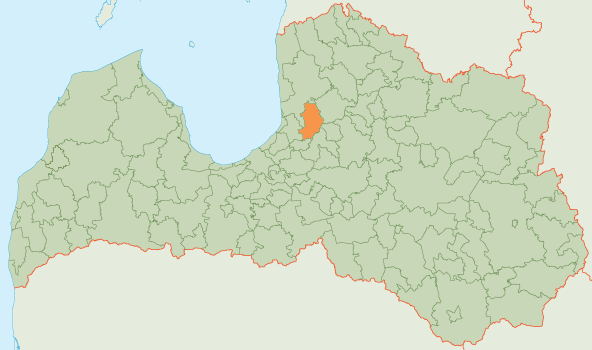
- Country: Latvia
- Formed: 2021
- Centre: Ragana

Government
  - Chairman: Linards Kumskis (RA)

Area
  - Total: 341.28 km^{2} (131.77 sq mi)
  - Land: 330.99 km^{2} (127.80 sq mi)
  - Water: 10.29 km^{2} (3.97 sq mi)

Population (2021)
  - Total: 4,833
  - Density: 14.60/km^{2} (37.82/sq mi)
- Website: www.krimulda.lv

Krimulda Municipality (Latvian: Krimuldas novads) is a former municipality in Vidzeme, Latvia. The municipality was formed in 2009 by merging Krimulda Parish and Lēdurga Parish. The administrative centre was Ragana.

On 1 July 2021, Krimulda Municipality ceased to exist and its territory was merged into Sigulda Municipality.

== See also ==
- Administrative divisions of Latvia (2009)
