= Melturi =

Village in Cēsis Municipality, Latvia

Coordinates: 57°13′16″N 25°13′49″E

- Village
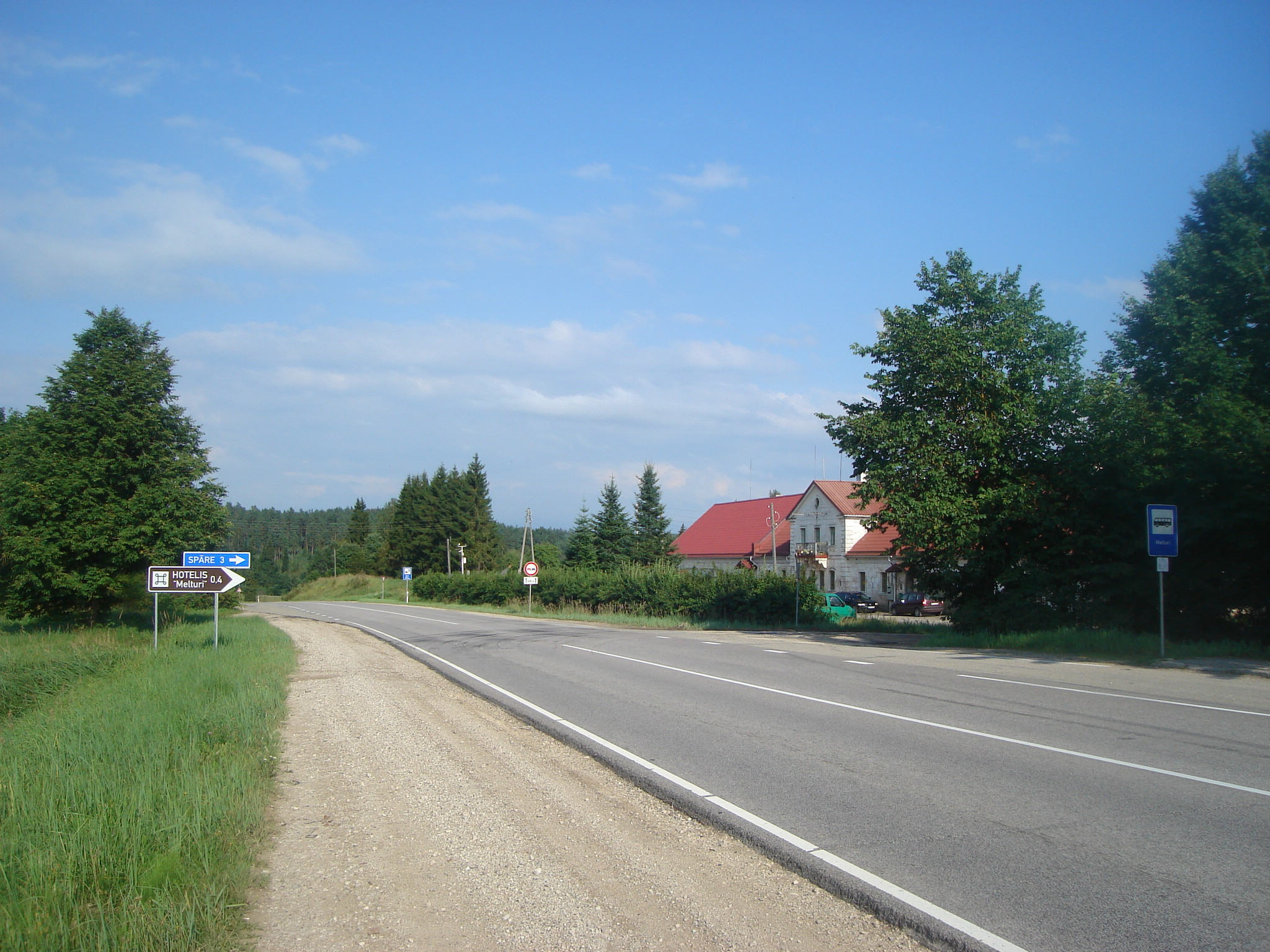
- Interactive map of Melturi
- Country: Latvia
- Municipality: Cēsis
- Parish: Drabeši

Population (2007)
  - Total: 30

Melturi is a village in the Drabeši Parish of Cēsis Municipality, in the Vidzeme region of Latvia. It has a railway stop on the Riga-Lugaži railway line (Drabeši Station). Not all trains stop at the station and there is no ticket counter (tickets can be bought online or on board).
