= Skrudaliena =

Village in Latvia

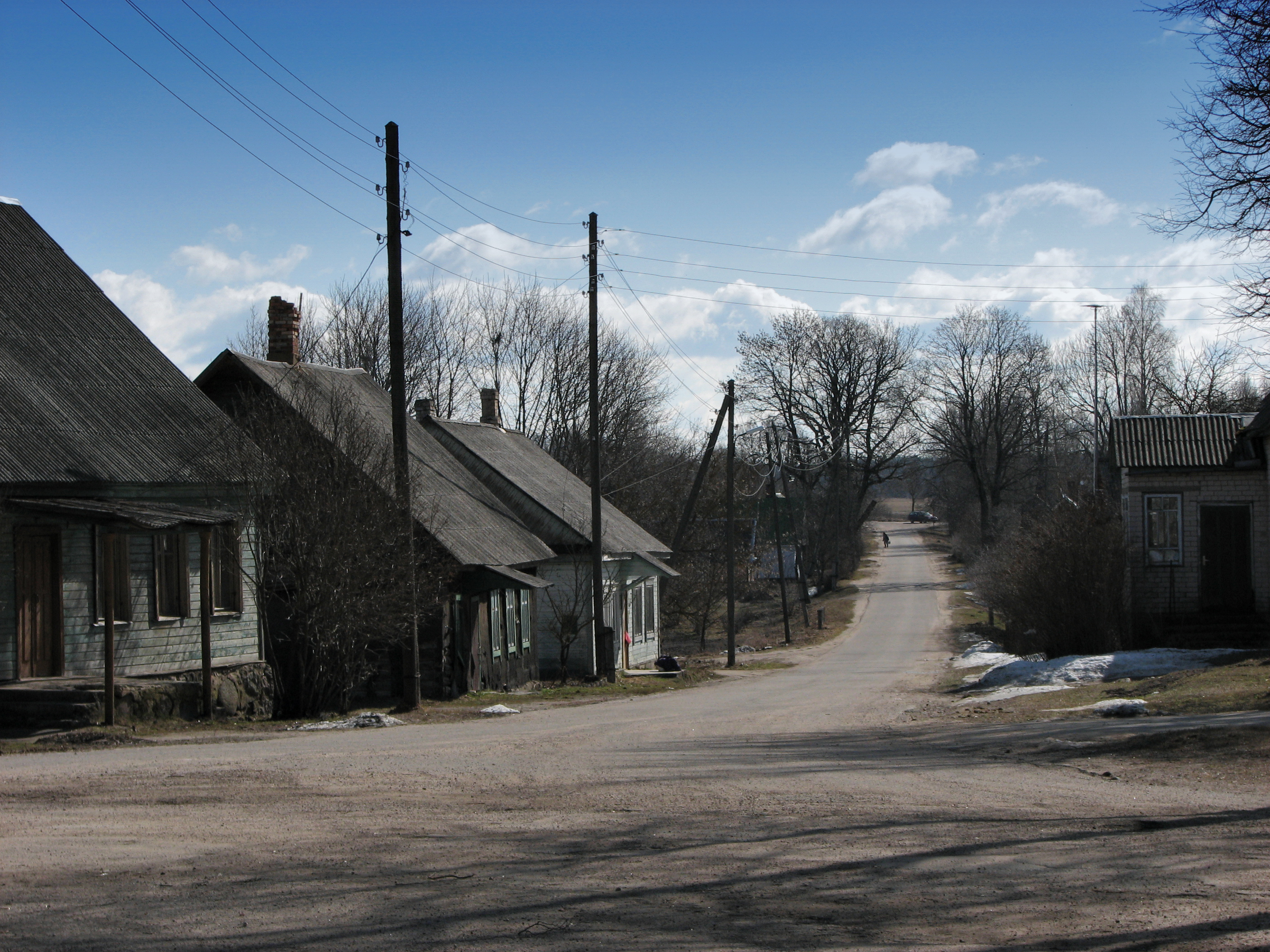
- Village street in Skrudaliena

- Location within Latvia
- Coordinates: 55°48′54″N 26°42′50″E
- Country: Latvia
- Municipality: Augšdaugava Municipality
- Founded: 1790

Population (2009)
  - Total: 186
- Time zone: UTC+2 (EET)
  - Summer (DST): UTC+3 (EEST)

Skrudaliena (Formerly: Skrudaļina) is a settlement in Skrudaliena Parish, Augšdaugava Municipality in the Selonia region of Latvia.
