= European route E264 =

Road in trans-European E-road network

E264

Major junctions
- From: Jõhvi (Estonia)
- To: Inčukalns (Latvia)

Location
- Countries: Estonia; Latvia
- Major cities: Jõhvi; Mustvee; Tartu; Elva; Valga; Valka; Strenči; Valmiera

Highway system
- International E-road network; A Class; B Class

European route E 264 is a Class B road part of the International E-road network. It begins in Jõhvi, Estonia, and ends in Inčukalns, Latvia. E264 consists of Estonian main road no. 3 and Latvian main road A3. The entire route is part of Via Hanseatica corridor.

The road follows: Jõhvi – Tartu – Valga – Valka – Valmiera – Inčukalns.

== Gallery ==
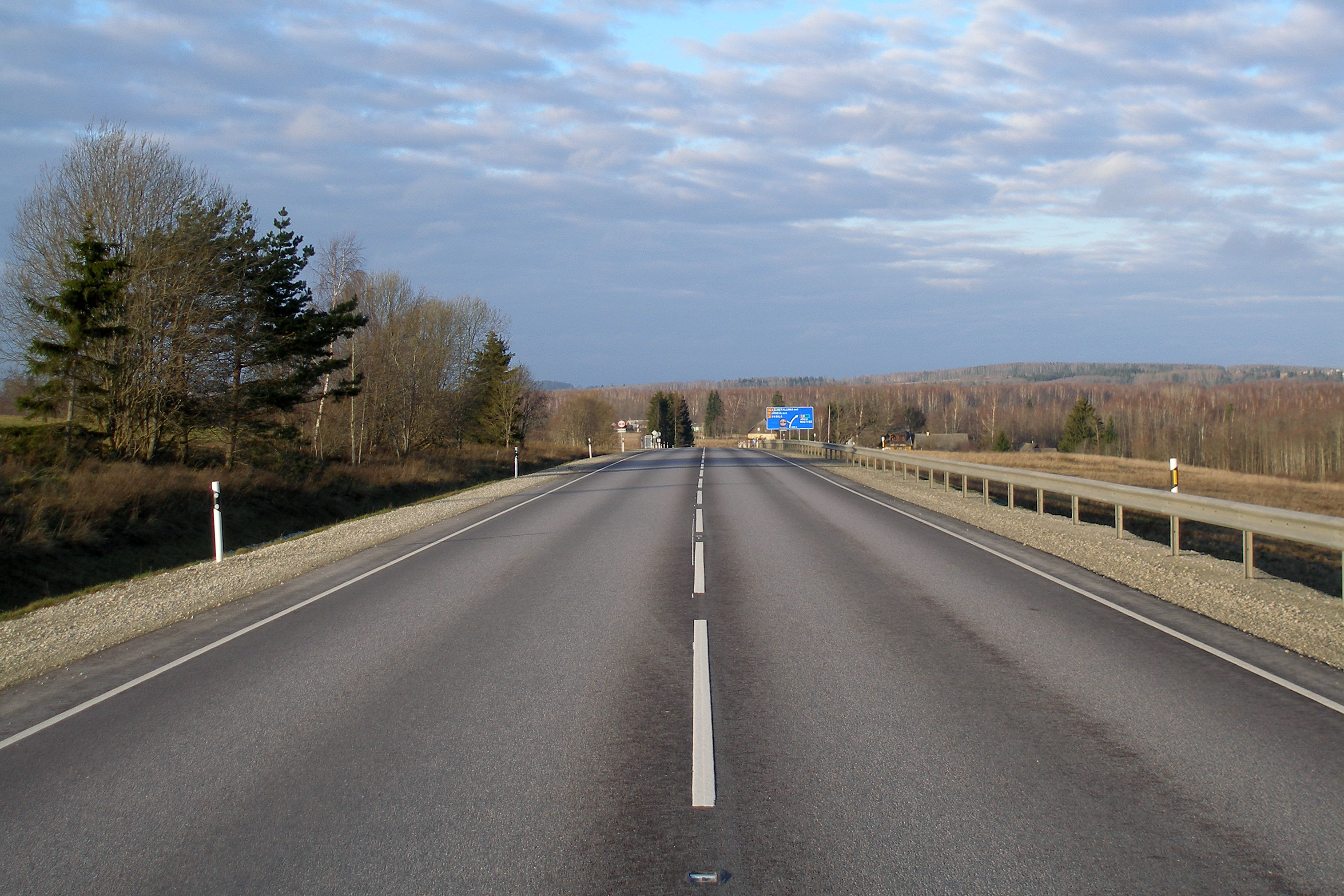
Near Aovere, Estonia

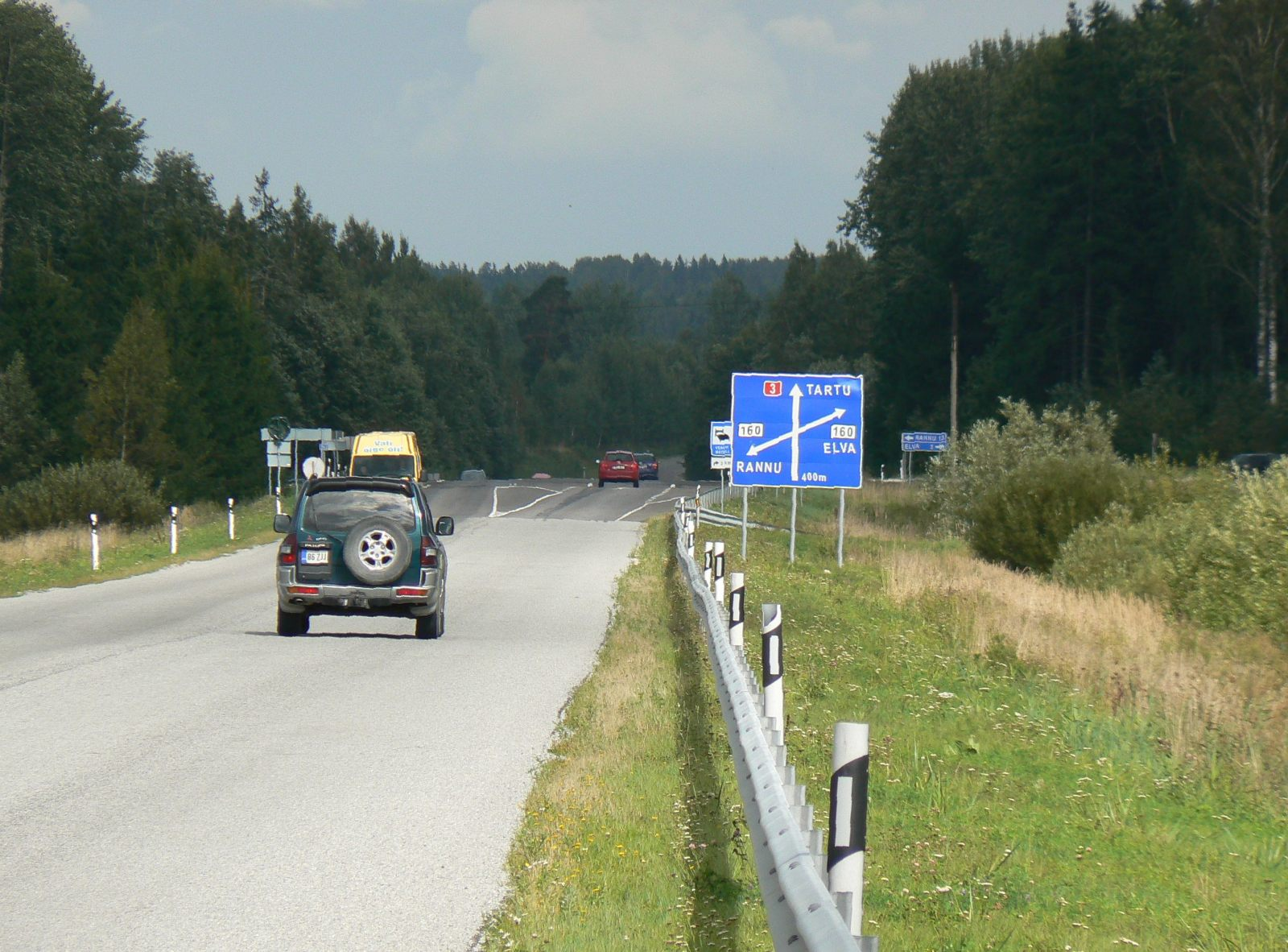
