= Jaunbērze =

Village in Latvia

Coordinates: 56°44′N 23°24′E

Jaunbērze is a village in southern Latvia, the administrative center of Jaunbērze Parish of Dobele Municipality, in the Semigallia region. Until July 1, 2009, it was part of Dobele District. The distance to the city of Dobele is 14 km, and to Riga is 61 km.
