= Pan-European Corridor I =

Road and rail investment priority area through the Baltic states

- Pan-European Corridor I highlighted in red

Major junctions
- Start end: Helsinki (Finland)
- End end: Warsaw and Gdańsk (Poland)

Location
- Countries: Finland, Estonia, Latvia, Lithuania, Russia and Poland

Highway system
- Pan-European corridors

The Corridor I is one of the Pan-European corridors. It runs between Helsinki in Finland, and Warsaw and Gdańsk in Poland. The corridor follows the route: Helsinki–Tallinn–Riga–Vilnius–Warsaw/Gdańsk.

== Branches ==
- Branch A (Via Hanseatica) – St. Petersburg to Riga to Kaliningrad to Gdańsk to Lübeck
- Branch B (Via Baltica/E67) – Helsinki to Warsaw.

== See also ==
- Rail Baltica
