= Drabeši =

Drabeši may refer to:

- Drabeši Parish, an administrative unit of the Cēsis Municipality, Latvia
- Drabeši (village), the administrative centre of Drabeši Parish
- Drabeši Manor, a manor in the historical region of Vidzeme, in northern Latvia
