= Vireši Parish =

Parish of Latvia

- parish of Latvia
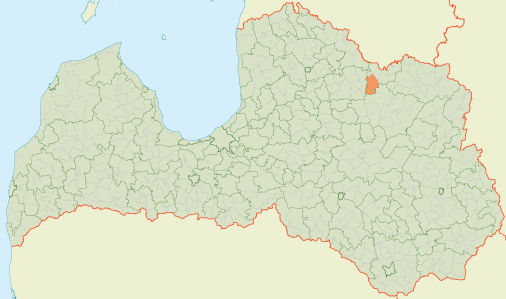
- 57°23′48″N 26°22′29″E
- Country: Latvia

Area
  - Total: 151.09 km^{2} (58.34 sq mi)
  - Land: 151.09 km^{2} (58.34 sq mi)
  - Water: 3.36 km^{2} (1.30 sq mi)

Population (1 January 2025)
  - Total: 506
  - Density: 3.35/km^{2} (8.67/sq mi)

Vireši Parish (Latvian: Virešu pagasts) is an administrative unit of Smiltene Municipality, Latvia.

== Towns, villages and settlements of Vireši parish ==
- Vireši
- Vidaga
