= Veclaicene Parish =

Parish of Latvia

- parish of Latvia
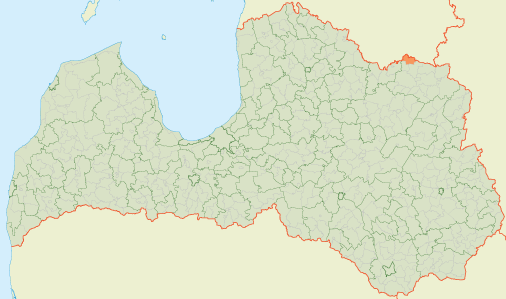
- 57°35′10″N 26°57′03″E
- Country: Latvia

Area
  - Total: 71.88 km^{2} (27.75 sq mi)
  - Land: 69.91 km^{2} (26.99 sq mi)
  - Water: 1.97 km^{2} (0.76 sq mi)

Population (1 January 2025)
  - Total: 292
  - Density: 4.18/km^{2} (10.8/sq mi)

Veclaicene Parish (Latvian: Veclaicenes pagasts) is an administrative unit of Alūksne Municipality, Latvia.

== Geography ==
Veclaicene parish has several small rivers — Līčupe, Pērļupīte and lakes — Dzērve Lake, Ieva Lake, Lake Ilgājs, Koruļu Lake, Palpieris Lake, Pilskalna Lake, Raipala Lake, Veclaicene Lake.
