= Ragana, Latvia =

Village in Latvia

Ragana
- village
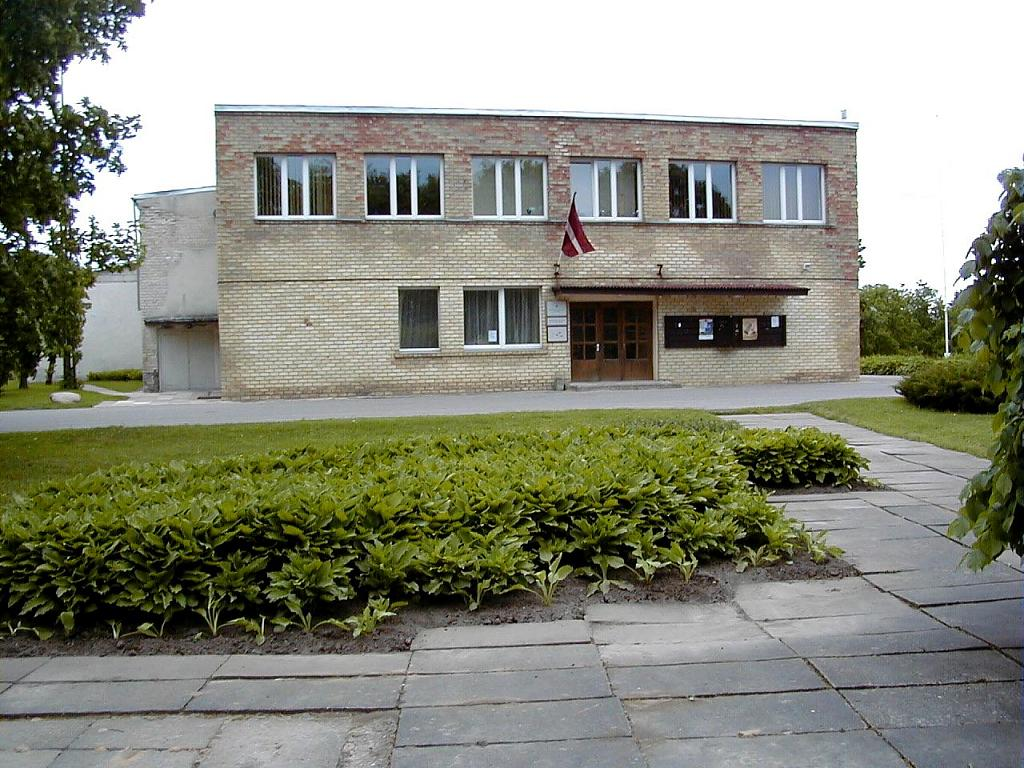
- Krimulda Municipality administrative building

- Location within Latvia
- Country: Latvia
- Municipality: Sigulda Municipality
- Elevation: 50 m (160 ft)

Population
  - Total: 1,194
- Post code: LV-2144
- Website: http://www.krimulda.lv

Ragana (German: Kremon) is a village in Krimulda Parish, Sigulda Municipality in the Vidzeme region of Latvia.

== Castle Krimulda ==
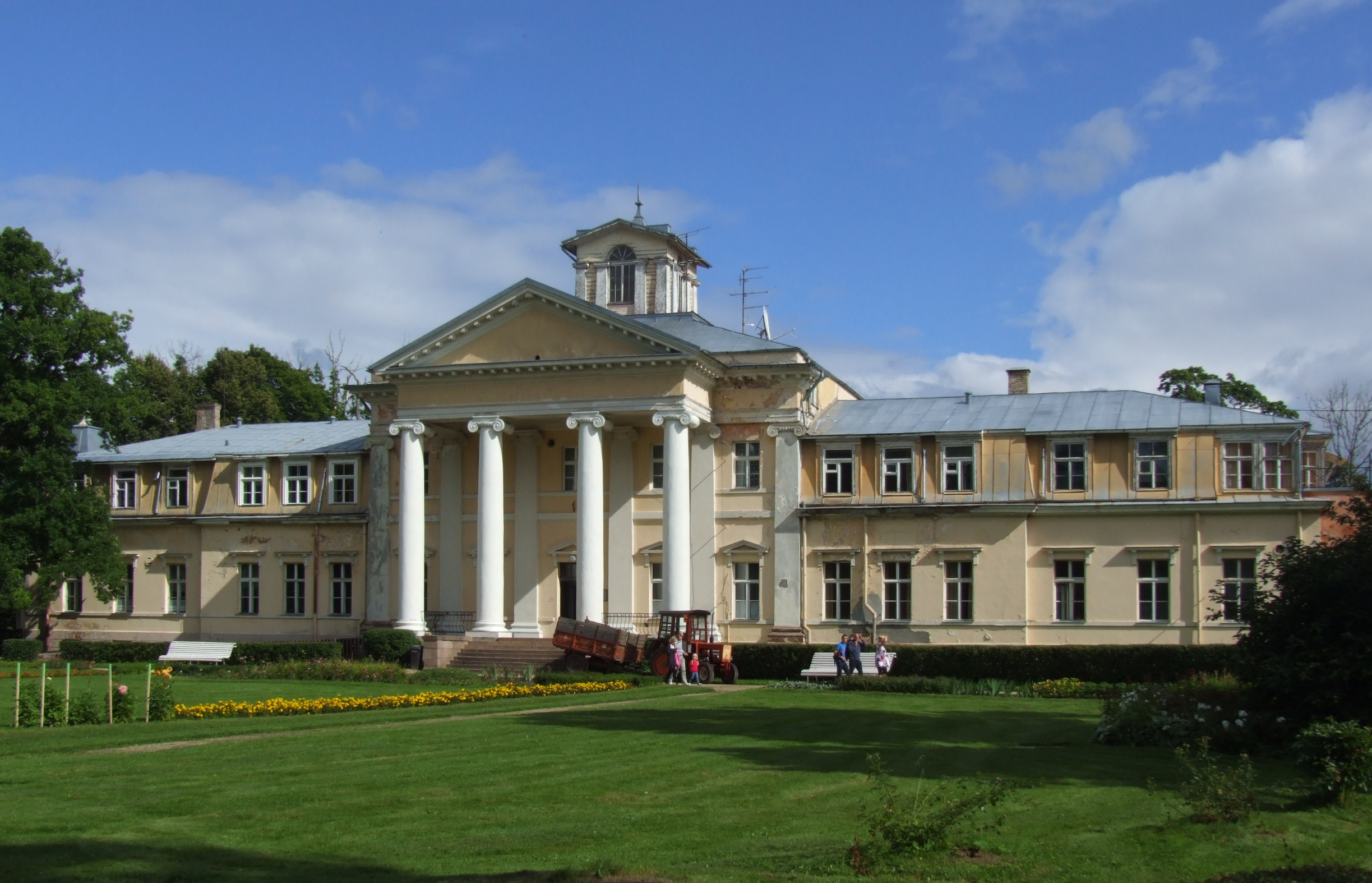
Krimulda manor house

Livonian Brothers of the Sword built in 1231 the castle Cremon now located 7 km east of today's Ragana. It was attacked in the Livonian War in 1559 by Russian troops and destroyed in 1601, during a Swedish military campaign in the "time of turmoil", and rebuilt again as a castle. In the Great Northern War, Castle Kremon (other spelling: Castle Cremon ) was destroyed once again. It was rebuilt as a manor house in the model of the northern Italian Villa Rotonda. Until 1817, Kremon Castle was the manor house of the manor Kremon (hence also called "Herrenhaus Kremon") owned by the Helmersen family and later owned by the Lieven family from 1817 to 1921.

Between 1922 and 1928, the first State Sanatorium for Bone Tuberculosis was established in the mansion Krimulda (thus the Latvian name) on behalf of the Latvian Red Cross. From 1948 to 1991 primary and middle school was accommodated in manor house. Between 1991 and 1995 in the mansion Krimulda various attempts failed to establish once again rehabilitation clinics for children and adolescents. After several years of vacancy, in 2002 the Rehabilitācijas centrs "Krimulda" GmbH took over the property. Krimulda Castle is a protected landmark building.
