= Inčukalns =

Village in Sigulda Municipality, Latvia

- Village
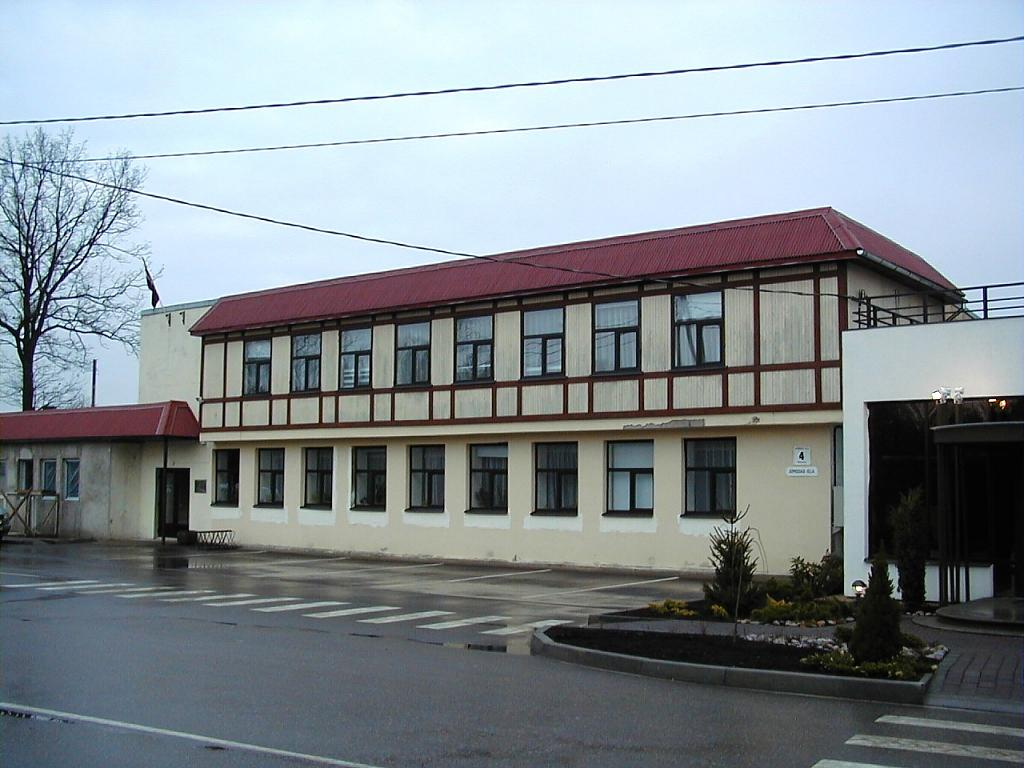
- Town hall in Inčukalns

- Inčukalns's location in Latvia
- Coordinates: 57°5′47″N 24°41′15″E
- Country: Latvia
- Municipality: Sigulda
- Parish: Inčukalns
- First time mentioned: 1436

Population (2006)
  - Total: 2,028

Inčukalns (German: Hinzenberg) is a village in Sigulda Municipality in the Vidzeme region of Latvia. It is the administrative centre of Inčukalns Parish and the former centre of Inčukalns Municipality.

Started in 1436, the parish was for centuries a part of Medieval Livonia. Its economy mainly subsists on farming and forestry activities for export trade. In 2020 Inčukalns had 7,640 residents in total.

== Places in Inčukalns ==
- Inčukalns Primary School
- Inčukalns Village Hall (Parish Hall)
