= Priekuļi Municipality =

Municipality of Latvia

Coordinates: 57°18′51″N 25°21′35″E

Priekuļi Municipality Priekuļu novads
- Municipality
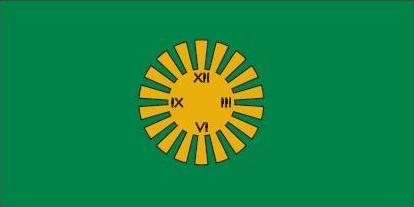
- Flag Coat of arms

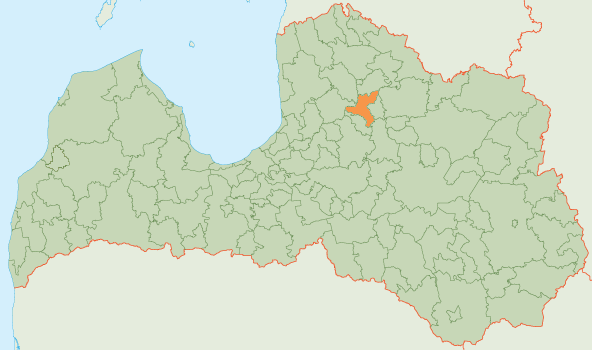
- Country: Latvia
- Formed: 2009
- Centre: Priekuļi

Government
  - Council Chair: Elīna Stapulone (LZS)

Area
  - Total: 301.66 km^{2} (116.47 sq mi)
  - Land: 295.38 km^{2} (114.05 sq mi)
  - Water: 6.28 km^{2} (2.42 sq mi)

Population (2021)
  - Total: 7,509
  - Density: 25.42/km^{2} (65.84/sq mi)
- Website: www.priekuli.lv

Priekuļi Municipality (Latvian: Priekuļu novads) is a former municipality in Vidzeme, Latvia. The municipality was formed in 2009 by merging Liepa Parish, Mārsnēni Parish, Priekuļi Parish and Veselava Parish, the administrative centre being Priekuļi. As of 2020, the population was 7,556.

On 1 July 2021, Priekuļi Municipality ceased to exist and its territory was merged into Cēsis Municipality.

== See also ==
- Administrative divisions of Latvia (2009)
