= Presidium Convent =

Association of Latvian student organizations

- P!K!
- Founded: September 27, 1919; 106 years ago University of Latvia
- Type: Fraternal umbrella association
- Affiliation: Independent
- Status: Active
- Emphasis: Male academic corporations
- Scope: International
- Chapters: 23 member fraternities
- Headquarters: Aldaru iela 7 Riga 1050; Latvia
- Website: www.pk.lv

Presidium Convent (Prezidiju Konvents; English: Convention of Presidencies of Latvian Students) also known as P!K! is an umbrella organization of all-male academic corporations in Latvia. It was founded in 1919.

== History ==
Presidium Convent was established on September 27, 1919, almost together with the University of Latvia. However it de facto started work only in the autumn of 1920, after the Latvian War of Independence ended. The founders of Presidium Convent were the five oldest Latvian student corporations: Fraternitas Moscoviensis (later called Fraternitas Lettica), Lettgallia, Lettonia, Selonia (Selonija) and Talavija.

In the interwar period many new Latvian student corporations were admitted to Presidium Convent. In the 1920s, all Baltic-German corps were admitted, including Curonia, Concordia Rigensis, Fraternitas Baltica, Fraternitas Rigensis, Gotonia, and Rubonia. In 1932, they all left in protest at a decision that the Latvian language must be used in Presidium Convent meetings.

After Soviet occupation of Latvia in 1940, the Presidium Convent was formally closed by the occupiers, like other Latvian student organizations, but continued to work unofficially. After World War II, most of Latvian student corporations renewed their work in exile. In such conditions, it was impossible to renew the Presidium Convent in its pre-war shape. In 1949, the global organization Union of Latvian Corporations (Latvian: Latvijas Korporāciju apvienība) was formed to unite all Latvian student corporations in exile.

The Presidium Convent was restored in Latvia in 1990. As of 2024, it includes 23 Latvian and Russian student corporations. Its headquarters is in Riga, Latvia.

== Member organizations ==
In the following list active corporations are in bold and inactive corporations and institutions are in italics.

=== Active members ===
Corporation	Charter date	P!K! membership	Founding institution	Location	Type	Motto	Colors	Ref.
Beveronia	May 4, 1922	October 23, 1923	University of Latvia	Riga, Latvia	Latvian	"Science draws the heights of perfection, brotherhood builds the strength of the people"	Purple; Gold; Blue	
Fraternitas Academica	September 16, 1926	November 8, 1928	University of Latvia	Riga, Latvia	Latvian	"For the Nation and Fatherland" and Amicus optima vitae possessio	Black; Light Green; Gold	
Fraternitas Arctica	November 7, 1880	October 31, 1922	Riga Polytechnic Institute	Riga, Latvia	Russian	Rci slovo tverdo	Gold; Black; Red	
Fraternitas Cursica	May 7, 1947	September 8, 1992	Baltic University	Pinneberg, Germany	Latvian	"Deeds for justice, loyalty to a friend, a sword to the fatherland".	Black; Gold; Blue	(Note: Received by L!K!A! on September 16, 1949.)
Fraternitas Imantica	February 18, 1947	September 3, 1991	Baltic University	Pinneberg, Germany	Latvian	Scientiae, populo, patriae! and "A stranger to the fatherland! Let the sword not rust!"	Red; Gold; White	
Fraternitas Lataviensis	September 16, 1926	November 20, 1928	University of Latvia	Riga, Latvia	Latvian	Pro patria, iustitia, honore	Black; White; Gold	
Fraternitas Lettica	October 20, 1902	September 27, 1919	Moscow University	Moscow, Russia	Russian	Scientia pro patria ("Science for the Fatherland")	Blue; Green; Gold	(Note: Originally called Fraternitas Moscoviensis.) (Note: Founding member of Presidium Convent.)
Fraternitas Livonica	October 29, 1926	November 20, 1928	University of Latvia	Riga, Latvia	Latvian	"Break, but do not bend" and "Man and name"	Light Blue; Violet; Gold	
Fraternitas Metropolitana	October 6, 1924	November 9, 1926	University of Latvia	Riga, Latvia	Latvian	"United forces for the honor, friend, fatherland"	Gold; Violet; Green	
Fraternitas Vanenica	June 20, 1947	January 5, 1993	LMU Munich	Munich, Germany	Latvian	For patriotism, duty, friendship and Veritati, humanitati, virtuti	Green; Red; Silver	
Gersicania	March 14, 1947	February 4, 1991	Baltic University	Pinneberg, Germany	Latvian	Amicus amico, omnia patriae and "Give your heart to a friend, be silent to a stranger, serve science, shed blood for the fatherland"	White; Violet; Green	
Lacuania	December 7, 1927	May 12, 1931	University of Latvia	Riga, Latvia	Latvian	Vires unitae agunt	Blue; Black; Gold	
Latvia	1917	April 19, 1921	Tartu Veterinary Institute	Tartu, Estonia	Latvian	Virtutes bonos dies viventi faciunt	Red; Blue; Gold	(Note: Tartu Veterinary Institute became part of Tartu University in 1918.)
Lettgallia	February 8, 1889	September 27, 1919	University of Tartu	Tartu, Estonia	Latvian	Per aspera ad astra ("Through thorns to the stars") and Labor et fidelitas ("Work and fidelity")	Green; Black; White	
Lettonia	February 19, 1870	September 27, 1919	University of Tartu	Tartu, Estonia	Latvian	Vitam, saluten, veritatem ("Life, health, truth") and Actilabores jucundi	Green; Blue; Gold	
Patria	September 20, 1926	November 20, 1928	University of Latvia	Riga, Latvia	Latvian	"For friendship and work, for fatherhood free" and Fidei et veritati	Orange; Green; Gold	
Selonija	November 24, 1880	September 27, 1919	Riga Polytechnic Institute	Riga, Latvia	Latvian	"For friend, for Fatherland" and Virtute et fide	Green; White; Red	
Talavija	December 14, 1900	September 27, 1919	Riga Polytechnic Institute	Riga, Latvia	Latvian	"Hands in hand" and "Work makes a man"	White; Green; Gold	
Tervetia	April 30, 1922	March 17, 1925	University of Latvia	Riga, Latvia	Latvian	"Everything for Latvia - everyone is one"	Orange; Silver; Blue	
Ventonia	November 21, 1917	Fall 1921	University of Tartu	Tartu, Estonia	Latvian	"For friend, honor, justice"	Blue; White; Green	

=== Inactive members ===
Corporation	Charter date and range	P!K! membership	Institution	Location	Type	Motto	Colors	Ref.
**Concordia Rigensis**	November 29, 1869	January 10, 1921 – May 14, 1932	Riga Polytechnic Institute	Riga, Latvia	German	Wahr und treu, kühn und frei and Concordia res parvae crescunt, discordia maximae dilabuntur	Blue; Gold; Red	
**Curonia**	1808	June 1924 – May 14, 1932	University of Tartu	Tartu, Estonia	German	"The honor of the heart of Kurzemniek"	Green; Blue; White	
Fraternitas Baltica	November 13, 1865 – 1938	December 1920 – May 14, 1932	Riga Polytechnic Institute	Riga, Latvia	German	Freundschaft, Frohsinn, Tugend, Wissen - soll man niebei den Balten missen	Red; Green; Gold	
**Fraternitas Rigensis**	January 21, 1824	Fall 1920 – May 14, 1932	University of Tartu	Tartu, Estonia	German	Leiden oder Triumphieren, Ambos oder Hammer sein	Blue; Red; White	
Fraternitas Vesthardiana	October 8, 1924 – 20xx ?	April 7, 1926	University of Latvia	Riga, Latvia	Latvian	"The glory of the nation is one's own honor" and "To be or not to be"	Grey; Red; Gold	
Gotonia	March 24, 1922 – 1939	Spring 1922	University of Latvia	Riga, Latvia	German	In Treue fest	Black; Light blue Red	
Philyronia	July 7, 1924 – 202x ?	May 11, 1926	University of Latvia	Riga, Latvia	Latvian	Vera amicitia – decus vitae and "Work, will, duty."	Brown; Green; Gold	(Note: Formed in Liepāja, Latvia, and moved to Riga to the University of Latvia on September 1, 1924.)
**Rubonia**	May 18, 1875	January 10, 1921 – May 14, 1932	Riga Polytechnic Institute	Riga, Latvia	German	Mit Eort und Tat für Ehr und Recht	Blue; White; Black	
Ruthenia	April 18, 1929 – 1998	November 2, 1935	University of Latvia	Riga, Latvia	Russian	Vera amicitia in calamitatibus dignoscitur and Rci slovo tverdo	Black; Orange; White	
Salgalia	June 18, 1927 – c.1985	May 12, 1931	University of Latvia	Riga, Latvia	Latvian	"Heart for a friend - chest for an enemy"	Red; Black; White	
Vendia	March 20, 1927 – 20xx ?	December 9, 1929	University of Latvia	Riga, Latvia	Latvian	"Fatherhood, honor, duty" and Virtue et exemplo	Green; Brown; Gold	
