= List of student corporations in Latvia =

Latvian student corporations and societies

Latvian student corporations are a type of student fraternity, similar to German Student Corps found at universities in Germany. Established in 1809 in Dorpat (now Tartu), Curonia was the first student corporation to be formed in the former Livonia. By 1934, 26 percent of the students at the University of Latvia belonged to a student corporation. Most Latvian male corporations are members of the Presidium Convent (P!K!); whereas, female corporations are united under the Studenšu Prezidiju Konvents (Female Student Presidium Convent or S!P!K! ).

In July 1940, all Latvian student organizations were banned under Soviet occupation. During this era, student organization members and alumni who remained in Latvia were subjected to political repression. After World War II, many Latvian student corporations reformed in exile, reestablishing their student chapter in Latvia after the restoration of Latvia's independence. The dates listed below are for each corporation's university chapter, exclusive of the dates for alumni and non-collegiate activity in exile.

The Latvian Corporations Association (LKA) was an umbrella organization for student corporations in exile, replacing the role of P!K!, which was also forbidden in Latvia under Soviet occupation. Former members of P!K! helped reestablish it after they were reestablished in Latvia.

In 2016, Talavija and Lettonia withdrew from the P!K!. and reformed of the Chargieren Convent (Šaržēto konvents or Š!K!/C!C!). This was a revival of C!C!, which was an umbrella organization for student corporations that was founded in Riga in 1871 and replaced by the P!K! in 1920.

Other similar student organizations, including academic societies (such as Austrums and Latviete) and concordiae (such as Konkordija Valdemārija), are not members of P!K! or S!P!K! but do interact. Austrums, Dzintars, Fraternitas Rusticana, Latviete, Valdemārija, and Zinteniece signed a partnership agreement on April 17, 1999. Konkordija Valdemārija was a founding member of the umbrella organization Concordia Seniorate (Konkordiju seniorāts, KS) in 1927; KS was closed during the Soviet occupation and operated for a time in exile before going defunct. Austrums was a founding member of the umbrella organization the Union of Societies (Vienību savienība, VS) which operated prior the Soviet occupation and was restored on April 23, 1990, although remains dormant since the mid–1990s. While the academic societies were in exile, the Union of Academic Societies (UAS) temporarily replaced VS.

== Male corporations ==
Following is a list of Latvian student corporations for males, with active corporations are in bold and inactive corporations and institutions in italics.

Corporation	Charter date and range	Founding institution	Founding location	Affiliation	Colors	Status	Ref.
**Beveronija**	May 4, 1922 – July 13, 1940; October 10, 1989	University of Latvia	Riga, Latvia	P!K!	Violet, Gold and Blue	Active	
**Concordia Rigensis**	November 29, 1869 – 1915; October 14, 1918 – January 31, 1919; September 1920 – October 14, 1939	Riga Polytechnic Institute	Riga, Latvia	KSCV (Note: The corporation closed during World War I and World War II. It reformed and has been based in Hamburg, Germany, since October 13, 1956.)	Royal blue, Goldenrod, Crimson	Inactive (in Latvia)	
**Concordia Rigensis**	November 29, 1869 – 1915; October 14, 1918 – January 31, 1919; September 1920 – October 14, 1939	Riga Polytechnic Institute	Riga, Latvia	P!K! (former)	Royal blue, Goldenrod, Crimson	Inactive (in Latvia)	
**Concordia Rigensis**	November 29, 1869 – 1915; October 14, 1918 – January 31, 1919; September 1920 – October 14, 1939	Riga Polytechnic Institute	Riga, Latvia	C!C! (former)	Royal blue, Goldenrod, Crimson	Inactive (in Latvia)	
**Curonia**	1808	University of Tartu	Tartu, Estonia	P!K! (former)	Green, Blue and White	Active	
**Curonia**	1808	University of Tartu	Tartu, Estonia	C!C! (former)	Green, Blue and White	Active	
**Fraternitas Academica**	September 16, 1926 – July 13, 1940; February 4, 1990	University of Latvia	Riga, Latvia	P!K!	Black, Light Green and Gold	Active	
**Fraternitas Academica**	September 16, 1926 – July 13, 1940; February 4, 1990	University of Latvia	Riga, Latvia	LKA (former)	Black, Light Green and Gold	Active	
**Fraternitas Arctica**	November 7, 1880 – July 13, 1940; May 19, 1990	Riga Polytechnic Institute	Riga, Latvia	P!K!, C!C! (former)	Gold, Grey and Red	Active	
Fraternitas Baltica	November 13, 1865 – 1938	Riga Polytechnic Institute	Riga, Latvia	P!K! (former)	Red, Green, Gold	Inactive	
**Fraternitas Cursica**	May 7, 1947 – October 1949; June 12, 1992	Baltic University	Pinneberg, Schleswig-Holstein, Germany	P!K!	Black, Gold and Blue	Active	(Note: The Baltic University in Exile was established in German refugee camps to educate displaced people from Estonia, Latvia, and Lithuania after World War II. Baltic University closed in the fall of 1949. The corporation was later reestablished in Riga.) (Note: In the summer of 1947, the corporation was a founder of the Baltic University Presidium Convention (BU PK), an umbrella organization for Latvian corporations founded in exile at Baltic University. BU PK ceased operations on October 7, 1949, when BU closed.) (Note: The corporation temporarily went inactive in 1949 when BU closed and was later reestablished abroad in exile. It moved to Riga in 1992 and became associated with the University of Latvia in the mid-1990s.)
**Fraternitas Cursica**	May 7, 1947 – October 1949; June 12, 1992	Baltic University	Pinneberg, Schleswig-Holstein, Germany	LKA (former)	Black, Gold and Blue	Active	
**Fraternitas Cursica**	May 7, 1947 – October 1949; June 12, 1992	Baltic University	Pinneberg, Schleswig-Holstein, Germany	BUPK (former)	Black, Gold and Blue	Active	
**Fraternitas Imantica**	February 18, 1947 – October 1949; July 13, 1990	Baltic University	Pinneberg, Schleswig-Holstein, Germany	P!K!.	Red, Gold and White	Active	(Note: The corporation went inactive when BU closed in 1949. It was reformed as an alumni group in exile and became active in Latvia in 1990 and now has chapters in Riga and Jūrmala.)
**Fraternitas Imantica**	February 18, 1947 – October 1949; July 13, 1990	Baltic University	Pinneberg, Schleswig-Holstein, Germany	LKA (former)	Red, Gold and White	Active	(Note: The corporation went inactive when BU closed in 1949. It was reformed as an alumni group in exile and became active in Latvia in 1990 and now has chapters in Riga and Jūrmala.)
**Fraternitas Imantica**	February 18, 1947 – October 1949; July 13, 1990	Baltic University	Pinneberg, Schleswig-Holstein, Germany	BUPK (former)	Red, Gold and White	Active	(Note: The corporation went inactive when BU closed in 1949. It was reformed as an alumni group in exile and became active in Latvia in 1990 and now has chapters in Riga and Jūrmala.)
**Fraternitas Lataviensis**	September 16, 1926 – July 13, 1940; September 16, 1989	University of Latvia	Riga, Latvia	P!K!	Black, White and Gold	Active	
**Fraternitas Lettica**	October 20, 1902 – July 13, 1940; May 12, 1989	Moscow University	Moscow, Russa	P!K!	Blue, Green and Gold	Active	(Note: Corporation was formed in Moscow, Russia, and was originally called Fraternitas Moscoviensis. It became active at the Latvian Higher Education Institution (now the University of Latvia) in 1919. Its name was changed in September 1920 to gain recognition by the institution.) (Note: Founding member of P!K! on September 27, 1919.)
**Fraternitas Lettica**	October 20, 1902 – July 13, 1940; May 12, 1989	Moscow University	Moscow, Russa	LKA (former)	Blue, Green and Gold	Active	(Note: Corporation was formed in Moscow, Russia, and was originally called Fraternitas Moscoviensis. It became active at the Latvian Higher Education Institution (now the University of Latvia) in 1919. Its name was changed in September 1920 to gain recognition by the institution.) (Note: Founding member of P!K! on September 27, 1919.)
**Fraternitas Livonica**	October 29, 1926 – July 13, 1940; May 20, 1990	University of Latvia	Riga, Latvia	P!K!	Light Blue, Purple (Violet purple) and Gold	Active	
**Fraternitas Metropolitana**	October 6, 1924 – July 13, 1940; December 18, 1989	University of Latvia	Riga, Latvia	P!K!	Gold, Violet and Green	Active	
**Fraternitas Rigensis**	January 21, 1823	University of Tērbatas	Terbatas, Germany	P!K! (former)	Blue, Red and White	Active	
**Fraternitas Rigensis**	January 21, 1823	University of Tērbatas	Terbatas, Germany	C!C! (former)	Blue, Red and White	Active	
**Fraternitas Vanenica**	June 20, 1947	LMU Munich	Munich, Bavaria, Germany	P!K!	Green, Red, and Silver	Active	(Note: Founded in exile after World War II and was, later, reestablished in Riga.) (Note: The corporation moved from Germany to the United States in 1950. It became active in began its activities in Latvia in September 1992 and is now associated with the University of Latvia.)
**Fraternitas Vanenica**	June 20, 1947	LMU Munich	Munich, Bavaria, Germany	LKA (former)	Green, Red, and Silver	Active	(Note: Founded in exile after World War II and was, later, reestablished in Riga.) (Note: The corporation moved from Germany to the United States in 1950. It became active in began its activities in Latvia in September 1992 and is now associated with the University of Latvia.)
**Fraternitas Vesthardiana**	October 8, 1924 – July 13, 1940; March 19, 1990	University of Latvia	Riga, Latvia	P!K!	Grey, Red and Gold	Active	
**Gersicania**	March 14, 1947 – October 1949; July 1, 1990	Baltic University	Pinneberg, Schleswig-Holstein, Germany	P!K!	White, Violet and Green	Active	(Note: After BU closed in 1949, the corporation went inactive. It reformed in exile in the United States in 1953. It became active in Latvia in 1990 and affiliated with the University of Latvia on July 1, 1990.)
**Gersicania**	March 14, 1947 – October 1949; July 1, 1990	Baltic University	Pinneberg, Schleswig-Holstein, Germany	LKA (former)	White, Violet and Green	Active	(Note: After BU closed in 1949, the corporation went inactive. It reformed in exile in the United States in 1953. It became active in Latvia in 1990 and affiliated with the University of Latvia on July 1, 1990.)
**Gersicania**	March 14, 1947 – October 1949; July 1, 1990	Baltic University	Pinneberg, Schleswig-Holstein, Germany	BUPK (former)	White, Violet and Green	Active	(Note: After BU closed in 1949, the corporation went inactive. It reformed in exile in the United States in 1953. It became active in Latvia in 1990 and affiliated with the University of Latvia on July 1, 1990.)
Gotonia	March 24, 1922 – 1939	University of Latvia	Riga, Latvia	P!K! (former)	Black, Light blue and Red	Inactive	
Klints		University of Latvia	Riga, Latvia			Inactive	
**Lacuania**	December 7, 1927 – July 13, 1940; October 10, 1990 – March 2020	University of Latvia	Riga, Latvia	P!K! (former)	Blue, Black and Gold	Inactive	(Note: The corporation was removed from P!K! on March 3, 2020 for failure to meet organizational obligations. Shortly afterwards, Lacuania ceased its operations.)
**Latvia**	February 17, 1917 – July 13, 1940; February 17, 1989	Tartu Veterinary Institute	Riga, Latvia	P!K!.	Red, Blue and Gold	Active	(Note: Tartu Veterinary Institute became part of Tartu University in 1918. The corporation is now affiliated with the University of Latvia in Riga.)
**Latvia**	February 17, 1917 – July 13, 1940; February 17, 1989	Tartu Veterinary Institute	Riga, Latvia	LKA (former)	Red, Blue and Gold	Active	(Note: Tartu Veterinary Institute became part of Tartu University in 1918. The corporation is now affiliated with the University of Latvia in Riga.)
**Lettgallia**	February 8, 1889 – July 13, 1940; February 8, 1989	University of Tartu	Riga, Latvia	P!K!	Green, Black and White	Active	(Note: The corporation was reformed at the University of Latvia.)
**Lettgallia**	February 8, 1889 – July 13, 1940; February 8, 1989	University of Tartu	Riga, Latvia	LKA (former)	Green, Black and White	Active	(Note: The corporation was reformed at the University of Latvia.)
**Lettonia**	February 19, 1870 – July 13, 1940; May 18, 1989	University of Tartu	Riga, Latvia	S!K!	Green, Blue, Gold	Active	
**Lettonia**	February 19, 1870 – July 13, 1940; May 18, 1989	University of Tartu	Riga, Latvia	P!K! (former)	Green, Blue, Gold	Active	
**Lettonia**	February 19, 1870 – July 13, 1940; May 18, 1989	University of Tartu	Riga, Latvia	C!C! (former)	Green, Blue, Gold	Active	
**Patria**	September 20, 1926 – July 13, 1940; April 3, 1993	University of Latvia	Riga, Latvia	P!K!	Orange, Green and Gold	Active	(Note: Patria was formed from the Riga Latvian Student Union (RLSS), established in 1908.)
**Patria**	September 20, 1926 – July 13, 1940; April 3, 1993	University of Latvia	Riga, Latvia	LKA (former)	Orange, Green and Gold	Active	(Note: Patria was formed from the Riga Latvian Student Union (RLSS), established in 1908.)
**Philyronia**	July 7, 1924 – July 13, 1940; November 17, 1989		Liepāja, Latvia	P!K!	Brown, Green and Gold	Active	(Note: Formed in Liepāja by former students of the University of Latvia in Riga. It established an additional headquarters at the University of Latvia on September 1, 1924. It reformed at the University of Latvia in 1989.)
**Philyronia**	July 7, 1924 – July 13, 1940; November 17, 1989		Liepāja, Latvia	LKA (former)	Brown, Green and Gold	Active	(Note: Formed in Liepāja by former students of the University of Latvia in Riga. It established an additional headquarters at the University of Latvia on September 1, 1924. It reformed at the University of Latvia in 1989.)
**Rubonia**	May 18, 1875	Riga Polytechnic Institute	Riga, Latvia	P!K! (former)	Blue, White and Black	Active	
Ruthenia	April 18, 1929 July 13, 1940	University of Latvia	Riga, Latvia	P!K! (former)	Black, Orange and White	Inactive	(Note: The corporation was established by Russian students of the Latvian University after a split in the Corp Fraternitas Arctica. During the Soviet occupation of Latvia, it operated in exile in Germany, the United States, and Australia. The corporation ceased operations in 1998. It was never restored in Latvia.)
Ruthenia	April 18, 1929 July 13, 1940	University of Latvia	Riga, Latvia	LKA (Former)	Black, Orange and White	Inactive	(Note: The corporation was established by Russian students of the Latvian University after a split in the Corp Fraternitas Arctica. During the Soviet occupation of Latvia, it operated in exile in Germany, the United States, and Australia. The corporation ceased operations in 1998. It was never restored in Latvia.)
Salgalia	June 18, 1927 – July 13, 1940	University of Latvia	Riga, Latvia	P!K! (former)	Red, Black and White	Inactive	(Note: The corporation operated in exile after World War II in the United States and Canada. It gradually ceased operations, no longer accepting new members by 1980. It never returned to Latvia as a student organization.)
**Selonija**	November 24, 1880 – July 13, 1940; June 6, 1990	Riga Polytechnic Institute	Riga, Latvia	P!K!,	Green, White and Red	Active	
**Selonija**	November 24, 1880 – July 13, 1940; June 6, 1990	Riga Polytechnic Institute	Riga, Latvia	C!C! (former)	Green, White and Red	Active	
**Talavija**	December 14, 1900 – July 13, 1940; May 23, 1989	Riga Polytechnic Institute	Riga, Latvia	S!K!	White, Green and Gold	Active	
**Talavija**	December 14, 1900 – July 13, 1940; May 23, 1989	Riga Polytechnic Institute	Riga, Latvia	P!K! (former)	White, Green and Gold	Active	
**Talavija**	December 14, 1900 – July 13, 1940; May 23, 1989	Riga Polytechnic Institute	Riga, Latvia	C!C! (former)	White, Green and Gold	Active	
**Tervetia**	April 30, 1922 – July 13, 1940; June 29, 1989	University of Latvia	Riga, Latvia	P!K!	Orange, Silver and Blue	Active	
**Tervetia**	April 30, 1922 – July 13, 1940; June 29, 1989	University of Latvia	Riga, Latvia	LKA (former)	Orange, Silver and Blue	Active	
**Vendia**	March 20, 1927 – July 13, 1940; May 15, 1990	University of Latvia	Riga, Latvia	P!K!	Green, Brown and Gold	Active	(Note: The corporation was reformed at the University of Latvia in Riga.)
**Vendia**	March 20, 1927 – July 13, 1940; May 15, 1990	University of Latvia	Riga, Latvia	LKA (former)	Green, Brown and Gold	Active	(Note: The corporation was reformed at the University of Latvia in Riga.)
**Ventonia**	November 21, 1917 – July 13, 1940; February 3, 1990	University of Tartu	Riga, Latvia	P!K!	Blue, White and Green	Active	
**Ventonia**	November 21, 1917 – July 13, 1940; February 3, 1990	University of Tartu	Riga, Latvia	LKA (former)	Blue, White and Green	Active	
Vetulia	March 7, 1902 – July 13, 1940	University of Latvia	Riga, Latvia	None	Blue, White and Gold	Inactive	(Note: This was a group for Jewish students.)

== Female corporations ==
Following are the Latvian student corporations for females, with active chapters indicated in bold and inactive chapters in italics.

Corporation	Charter date and range	Founding institution	Founding location	Affiliation	Colors	Status	Ref.
**Aurora**	May 8, 1933 – July 13, 1940; June 11, 1992	University of Latvia	Riga, Latvia	S!P!K!	Gold, Blue and Red	Active	(Note: The corporation formed from a separation of the student society Montānija.)
**Daugaviete**	September 6, 1921 – July 13, 1940; March 24, 1990	University of Latvia	Riga, Latvia	S!P!K!	Purple, Green and Gold	Active	(Note: Founding member of S!P!K!.)
**Dzintra**	May 20, 1924 – July 13, 1940; October 12, 1989	University of Latvia	Riga, Latvia	S!P!K!	Orange, Green and Light blue	Active	
**Gaujmaliete**	March 22, 1927 – July 13, 1940; January 24, 1990	University of Latvia	Riga, Latvia	S!P!K!	White, Blue and Gold	Active	
**Gundega**	November 29, 1923 – July 13, 1940; November 29, 1989	University of Latvia	Riga, Latvia	S!P!K!	Green, Blue, and Silver	Active	
**Imeria**	May 20, 1924 – July 13, 1940; April 12, 1990	University of Latvia	Riga, Latvia	S!P!K!	Brown, Blue and Gold	Active	
**Līga**	March 4, 1928 – 1940; April 7, 1990 – October 4, 2003; April 7, 2013	Latvian Conservatory	Riga, Latvia	S!P!K!	Brown, Pink and Yellow	Active	(Note: The corporation was originally called the Latvian Academy of Music Student Association “Līga”. After exile, it was reactivated at the Jāzeps Vītols Latvian Academy of Music in Riga. It ceased operations between 2003 and 2013.)
**Selga**	February 17, 1927 – July 13, 1940; April 13, 1990	University of Latvia	Riga, Latvia	S!P!K!	Yellow, Blue and Silver	Active	
Sororitas Slavia (see **Tatiana**)	December 19, 1931 – October 2, 1932	University of Latvia	Riga, Latvia		Gold, Blue, Red	Inactive	(Note: Sororitas Tatiana was formed by the merger of the Russian student corporations Sororitas Slavia and Tatiana. Its membership consists of female students who are interested in the Russian language and culture.)
**Spīdola**	March 11, 1947 – September 1949; July 28, 1991	Baltic University	Pinneberg, Schleswig-Holstein, Germany	S!P!K!	Gold, Purple and White	Active	(Note: The corporation closed in 1949 when BU ceased operations. Its members reformed the corporation in exile in the United States, Germany, Canada, and Australia. It began operations in Latvia in 1991.)
**Staburadze**	September 2, 1947		Munich, Bavaria, Germany	S!P!K!	Red, Silver and Dark blue	Active	(Note: The corporation was formed by nine Latvian students at three Munich universities, in exile after World War II. It was established in Latvia in 1993.)
**Sororitas Tatiana** (see Slavia)	January 17, 1932 – July 13, 1940; December 10, 1990	University of Latvia	Riga, Latvia	S!P!K!	Light green, Dark blue and Pink	Active	
**Varavīksne**	November 25, 1927 – July 18, 1940; November 29, 1989	University of Latvia	Riga, Latvia	S!P!K!	Blue, Gold and Violet	Active	(Note: Corporation formed from a literary society, the Student Association “Varavīksne, established on March 6, 1922.)
**Zinta**	April 21, 1947 – October 1949; August 10, 1992	Baltic University	Pinneberg, Schleswig-Holstein, Germany	S!P!K!	Blue, Black and Green	Active	

== Other organizations ==
Organization	Charter date and range	Founding institution	Founding location	Affiliation	Type	Colors	Status	Ref.
Ausma (see Latviete)	March 21, 1925 – July 13, 1940	University of Latvia	Riga, Latvia	VS (former)	Academic society (student union), female	Dark green and Gold	Merged	(Note: Although the group attempted to operate abroad, its members in Latvia joined Latviete in 1993. Thus, Ausma never reformed in Latvia.)
Austrums	October 19, 1883 – August 28, 1940; September 13, 1990	Moscow University/University of Latvia	Moscow, Russian Empire	VS	Academic society (student union), male	Cream and Cherry red	Active	(Note: Austrums began operating in Riga in 1919. After exile, it was reformed in Latvia at Riga Technical University on September 13, 1990, and at the University of Latvia on October 30, 1993.)
Dzintars	February 2, 1947		Göttingen, Germany	Pax Romana	Catholic student association, coed	Blue, Yellow, White and Red	Active	(Note: Formed as the Association of Latvian Catholic Students Outside Latvia by students who were in exile from Latvia, which was under Soviet occupation. Its headquarters were in Germany, Belgium, and the United States before moving to Latvia on July 7, 1991. As of 2023, it has chapters in Liepāja, Rēzekne, and Riga.)
Fraternitas Rusticana	November 2, 1921 – July 13, 1940; August 30, 1990	University of Latvia	Riga, Latvia	None	Student association, male	Purple and Gold	Active	
Konkordija Valdemārija	February 11, 1927 – August 31, 1940; July 23, 1990	University of Latvia	Riga, Latvia	KS (former)	Concordia, male	Blue, Orange, Green and Gold	Active	
Konkordija Zinteniece	October 20, 1929 – October 31, 2007		Riga, Latvia	KS (former)	Concordia, female	Gold, Black, Silver and Red	Inactive	
Latviete	March 1, 1925 – July 13, 1940; March 24, 1990	University of Latvia	Riga, Latvia	VS	Academic society (student union), female	Carmine red, Cream and Silver	Active	
Līdums	October 21, 1925 – November 26, 2010	University of Latvia	Riga, Latvia	VS	Academic society (student union), male	Cream and Cherry red	Inactive	
Zelmenis	November 18, 1924 – August 31, 1940; 1990 – October 6, 2007	University of Latvia	Riga, Latvia	VS	Concordia, male	Green, Silver, Blue and Gold	Inactive	(Note: Changed format from a student association to a concordia in 1927. Remaining members joined Konkordija Valdemārija after dissolution.)
Zemgalija	1892 – 1897; July 21, 1920 – February 3, 1941	Riga Polytechnic Institute/University of Latvia	Riga, Latvia	None	Student society, coed (since 1920)		Inactive	(Note: Left and Marxist-leaning. Named Stars from 1908 to 1917.)
Zaļā zeme	December 19, 1933 – November 30, 1940	Art Academy of Latvia	Riga, Latvia		Academic society (student union)/vienotne, male		Inactive	
