= Jānis Puriņš =

Latvian Riflemen

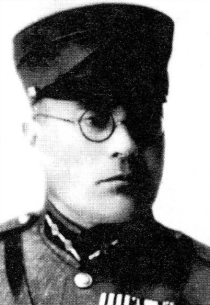
- Born: 25 April 1889; Mārsnēni Parish, Governorate of Livonia, Russian Empire
- Died: 1944 (aged 54–55); Likely in Riga, Latvian Soviet Socialist Republic, Soviet Union
- Military career
- Allegiance: Russian Empire; Latvia; Nazi Germany
- Branch: Imperial Russian Army; Latvian National Armed Forces; Wehrmacht
- Service years: 1910 – 1918; 1919 – 1940; 1941 – 1944
- Rank: Colonel
- Conflicts: World War I; Latvian War of Independence; Soviet Westward Offensive; Battle of Daugavpils; World War II
- Awards: Order of Lāčplēsis (1920); Virtuti Militari; Order of Vytautas the Great

Jānis Puriņš was a Latvian Rifleman and later colonel (since 1925), commander of the 1st Kurzeme Division of the Latvian Army and commander of the Eastern Front during the Latgale liberation operation during the Latvian War of Independence. He received the Knight's rank of the Order of Lāčplēsis.

== Biography ==
Puriņš was born on 25 April 1889 in the "Sakaiņi" homestead in Mārsnēni Parish near Priekuļi to the family of farmer Jānis senior. As a child, Puriņš studied at the Rauna Parish school and Valmiera city school. In November 1910, he was drafted into the army of the Russian Empire. He served as head of the Cēsis war district, then in the curatorium of the Vilnius Military District. At the beginning of the First World War, in 1915 he was transferred to the 173rd, later the 3rd Reserve Regiment in Toropec and Peterhof. From October 1916 to February 1917 he studied at the 1st Moscow Praporshchik School. He was the leader of the 4th Vidzeme Latvian Riflemen Regiment, later - the commander of a machine gun team until demobilization in March 1918.

After the proclamation of the Republic of Latvia in November 1918, he joined the Cēsis Volunteer Company and at the beginning of the Latvian War of Independence took part in the battles against the Red Army near Āraiši Lake, Līgatne and Ieriķi; later he retreated to Kurzeme, where he took part in the 16 January 1919 battle near Lielauce. On 31 March Puriņš was appointed battalion commander after taking Riga, he was promoted to lieutenant colonel and head of the Riga Fortified District

In June 1919, Lieutenant Colonel Puriņš was sent to the Latgale Front in the vicinity of Lubāna and Atašiene, and on 7 August he was appointed commander of the 2nd Ventspils Infantry Regiment. On 16 October he was appointed Commander of the 1st Kurzeme Division and Commander of the Eastern Front. He led the division's battles against the Bermontians in Selonia and held a front against the Red Army along the banks of the Daugava. During the operation to liberate Latgale, Latvian Army units under the command of Lieutenant Colonel Puriņš captured most of Latgale from the Red Army. On 13 August 1920 he was awarded the Military Order of Lāčplēsis for leading battles in Latgale and for winning battles at Daugavpils and the liberation of Rēzekne, and was appointed a member of the Council of the Order.

On 29 September 1920 Janis Puriņš resigned as the commander of the Kurzeme Division but remained as the commander of the 2nd Ventspils Infantry Regiment. On 22 June 1925 he was promoted to colonel. In the middle of 1928, he was transferred to the Riga War District Administration. At the end of the 1930s, he again served as commander of the regiment retired from service in 1939, and lived in his father's home in Sakaiņi, Mārsnēni Parish.

During the Second World War he was the commandant of the Mārsnēni, Liepa and Ranka parishes (1941-1944). On 13 October 1944, during the Soviet re-occupation of Latvia, he was arrested by Soviet soldiers, and on 18 November 1944, after the verdict of the 3rd Baltic Navy Military Tribunal, Jānis Puriņš was imprisoned in Riga's 2nd Prison, where he disappeared and was likely executed.

== Bibliography ==
- Es viņu pazīstu: latviešu biogrāfiskā vārdnīca. [redaktors Žanis Unāms]. [Grandheivena]: Raven Printing, 1975.398.lpp.
- Bebris, R. "Daugavpils atbrīvošana 1920. gada 3. janvārī." Militārs apskats, 1935. Nr. 2, 214.-229. lpp.
