= Eduards Veidenbaums =

Latvian poet

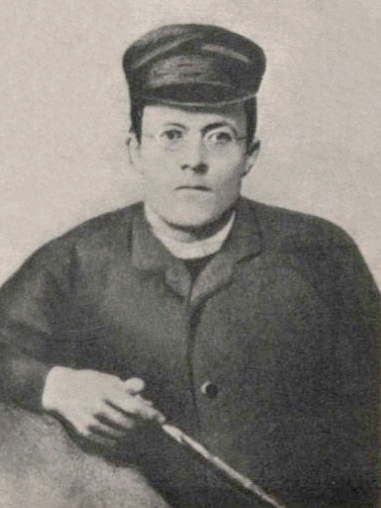
- Born: 3 October 1867; Priekuļi parish, Governorate of Livonia, Russian Empire (now Latvia)
- Died: 24 May 1892 (aged 24); Mūrmuiža parish, Russian Empire (now Latvia)
- Occupations: Poet and translator

Eduards Veidenbaums (3 October 1867 – 24 May 1892) was a Latvian poet and translator.

== Biography ==
Eduards Veidenbaums was born at the Glāznieki farmstead in the Priekuļi parish (now territory of Cēsis). In 1872 his family moved to Kālāči in the Mūrmuiža parish in to a peasant family. In 1887 after finishing Riga governorate gymnasium, Veidenbaums started to study law at the University of Tartu. During his studies in Tartu he spent some time in the house of the student corporation Lettonia, although he did not become a member of the student corporation. Veidenbaums' interests included economics, farming and history and was one of the founders of the scientific literary society Pīpkalonija.

After five months of illness he died of tuberculosis on 24 May 1892 in Mūrmuiža parish and was buried in the village cemetery of Liepa.

== Bibliography ==
=== Poetry ===
- Dzejas (1896)
- Dzejas (London 1900)

=== Complete works ===
- Kopoti raksti. 1—2. R.: LVI, (1961)
- Raksti (1926)
- Kopoti raksti. 1—6 (1907–1909)

=== Selections ===
- Dzejas. R.: Nordik (2005)
- Domāju es domas dziļas... R.: Draugi N.I.M.S. (2000)
- Brīvības cēlajais gars. R.: Liesma (1978)
- Izlase. R.: LVI (1952)

=== About the writer ===
- Līvija Volkova. Eduards Veidenbaums. R. (1979)
- A.Vilsons. Eduarda Veidenbauma dzīve. R. (1967)
- Rūdolfs Egle. Eduards Veidenbaums dzīvē un darbos. Cēsis/R. (1926)
