= George Armitstead (mayor) =

Latvian politician (1847–1912)

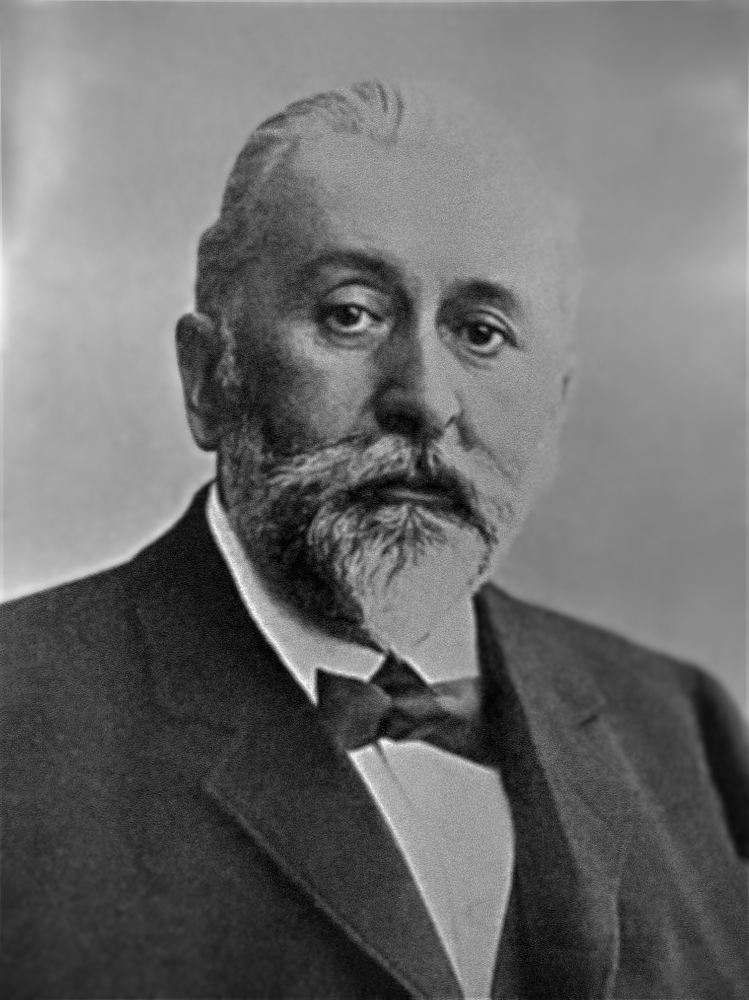

4th Mayor of Riga
- In office 7 May 1901 – 17 November 1912
- Preceded by: Ludvig Willhelm Kerkovius
- Succeeded by: Willhelm Robert von Bulmerink

Personal details
- Born: 27 October 1847 Riga, Livonia, Russian Empire
- Died: 17 November 1912 (aged 65) Riga, Livonia, Russian Empire (today Latvia)

George Armitstead (Latvian: Džordžs Armitsteds; 27 October 1847 – 17 November 1912) was an engineer, entrepreneur and the fourth mayor of Riga.

== Life ==
George Armitstead was born in Riga, Latvia (then: Russian Empire) into a British merchant family; his uncle was George Armitstead, 1st Baron Armitstead.

In 1869, Armitstead graduated from the Riga Polytechnical Institute with excellence, and was one of the founders of the Fraternitas Baltica fraternity. He improved his knowledge at Zurich and Oxford universities. Later on, Armitstead worked as an engineer in Russia. After working in Russia, he came back to Riga, where his family owned many properties and factories, and became a significant social figure of the city life.

On 7 May 1901 the Riga City Council elected Armitstead to be the Mayor of Riga. He transformed Riga rapidly: he built many of today's buildings in Riga, 13 schools, 3 hospitals, the National Museum, the Zoo, libraries and cafés. Industry and commerce developed significantly. During the period when he was mayor, Riga turned from a small city into a major European city.

Emperor Nicholas II of Russia appreciated Armitstead's work and titled him a Laird of the Russian Empire, while offering him to become the Mayor of St Petersburg, but Armitstead refused.

== Death ==
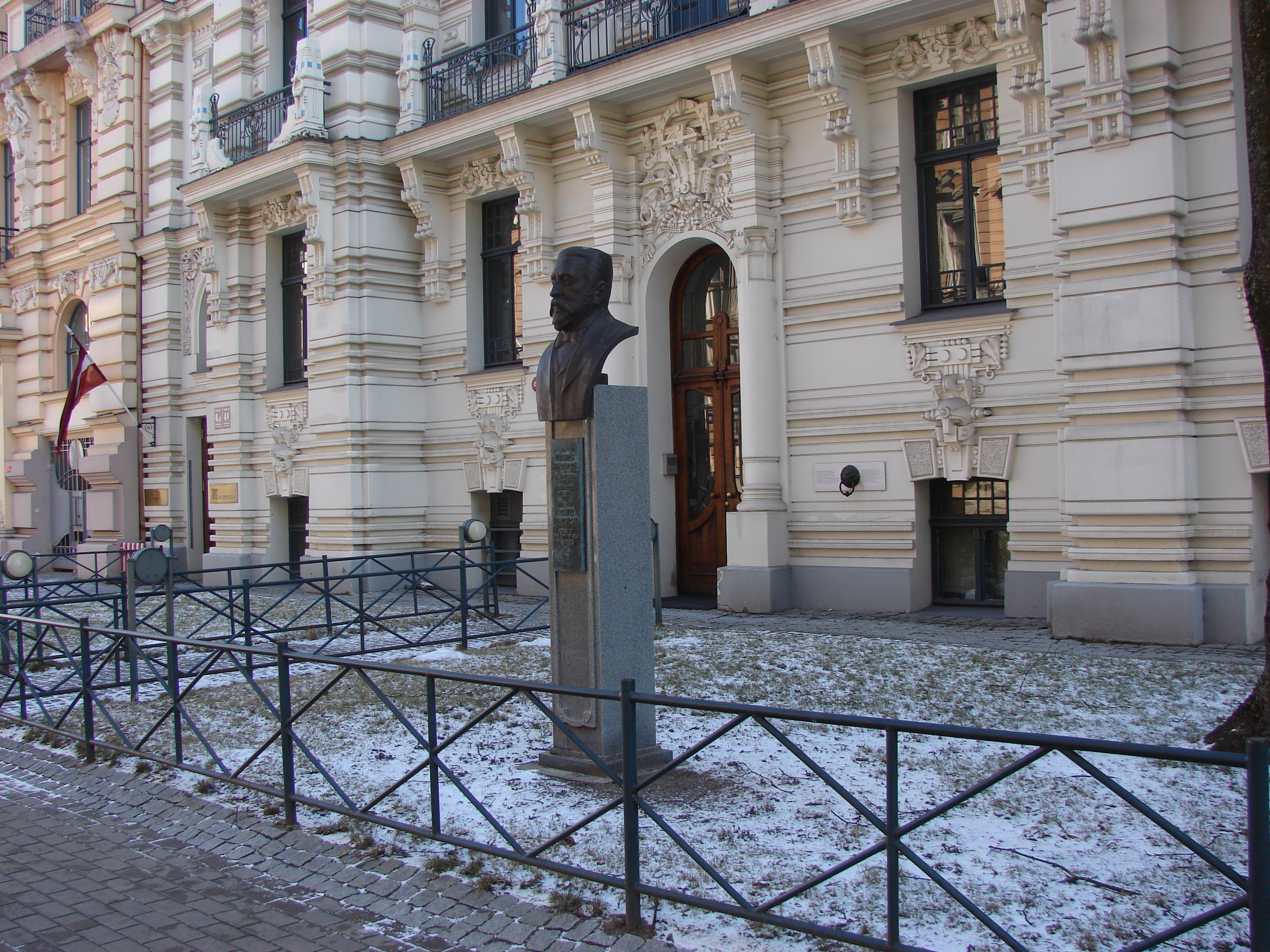
Bust of Armitstead on Strēlnieku iela, Rīga

In 1912 Armitstead fell ill. On 29 October Riga City Council awarded him Honorary Citizenship. George Armitstead died on 17 November 1912. Today, Armitstead is remembered as one of the most honorable people of Riga.

== Commemoration ==
Queen Elizabeth II unveiled a memorial statue of Armitstead in 2006

In 2006, during her first visit to Latvia, Queen Elizabeth II unveiled a memorial statue of George Armitstead, with his wife Cecile and dog. The monument is in the gardens close to the Latvian National Opera. There is also a plaque in his memory on his house at 19 Mārstaļu Street, Riga and a bust on Strēlnieku ielā.

== Sources ==
- GHistopry
- arcyive
