= Liepa Manor =

Manor house in Latvia

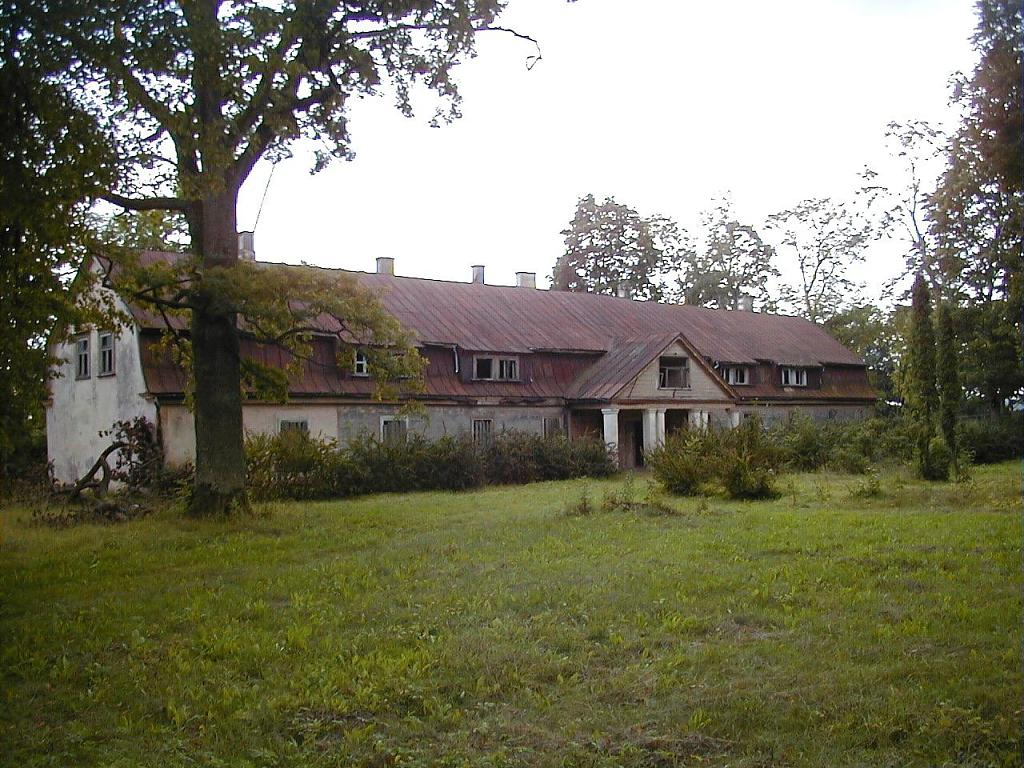
- Liepa Manor house (German: Lindenhof) in 2001.

- Location within Latvia

General information
- Location: Liepa Parish, Cēsis Municipality,, Latvia
- Coordinates: 57°22′11.9″N 25°26′16.5″E
- Completed: 19th century

Liepa manor (German: Lindenhof, Latvian: Liepas muiža) is a manor house located in Liepa Parish, Cēsis Municipality in the Vidzeme region of Latvia, about 100 km away from Riga and 14 km away from Priekuļi. Liepa estate was established in 1672. The current manor house was built during the 19th century. From 1919 to 1970, it housed the Liepa primary school.

== History ==
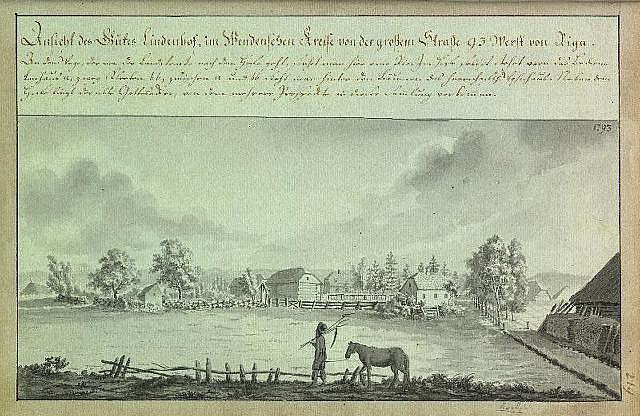
Liepa manor house in 1793. Drawing by Johann Wilhelm Krause from the collection of Johann Christoph Brotze.

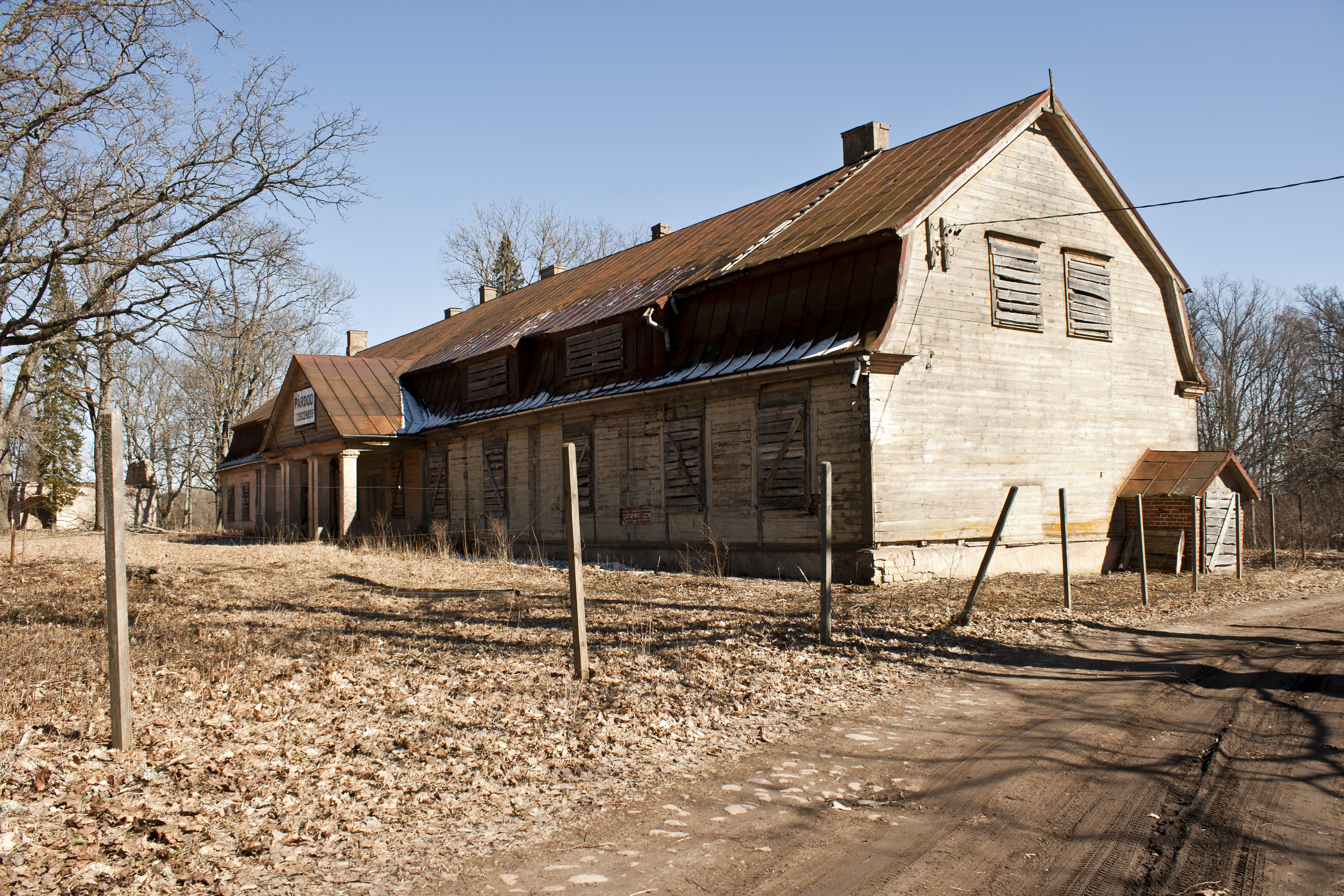
Liepa abandoned wooden manor.

In 1582 the Duchy of Livonia became a part of Polish–Lithuanian Commonwealth, which restored the Catholic diocese in Cēsis. At the start of Swedish reign in Vidzeme in 1624, Gustavus Adolphus of Sweden allocated all of his land to Axel Oxenstierna, the Lord High Chancellor of Sweden. In the year 1672 tens of villages were divided from the Cēsu county of Cēsis Castle. In the same year on the land of six of those villages the Liepa estate was established. From 1824 onward the owners of the estate were the noble Pander family. The last owner of the manor was Charlotte von Wulf. From 1919 to 1970 it housed the Liepa primary school.

== Manor park ==
Manor Park was originally created along the stream Little Ellite with many small water ways, bridges over creeks and ditches. Park has variety of tree species including, according to inventory of 1994, linden, oak, maple, ash, Siberian fir, jasmine, lilac, apple. The park is currently in need of renovation. However it still delights visitors with the apple harvest.

The manor's plan of 1787 shows a fountain and a cascade of five ponds. Later plans shows total of nine ponds, added over time. The ponds have survived, but at the time of the restoration of the manor they were in a dilapidated state. Ponds are currently being cleaned up and their former borders restored. Unfortunately, the fountain, which is marked in the plan of 1787, has been lost.
