= Edgar Silinsh =

Latvian physicist

Edgar Imant Silinsh
- Born: 21 March 1927; Līgatne, Latvia
- Died: 26 May 1998 (aged 71); Rīga, Latvia
- Education: University of Latvia, Leningrad State University
- Known for: molecular polaron model
- Awards: Grand Medal of the Latvian Academy of Sciences (1997)
- Scientific career
- Fields: Semiconductor physics, atomic spectroscopy, philosophy of science
- Workplaces: Institute of Physical Energetics, Latvian Academy of Sciences
- Doctoral advisor: Jāzeps Eiduss; K. Taganov

Edgar Imant Silinsh (Latvian: Edgars Imants Siliņš, Russian: Эдгар Александрович Силиньш, Edgar Aleksandrovich Silinsh; 21 March 1927 – 26 May 1998) was a Soviet and Latvian scientist in the field of semiconductor physics and philosophy of science, academician of the Latvian Academy of Sciences (1992).

== Biography ==
Edgar Silinsh was born the 4th child in a family of prosperous farmer Aleksandrs Siliņš (1875—1934) on the "Veclapsas" farmstead in Līgatne municipality of Riga district. During his school years, he was mostly interested in literature and history rather than in physical sciences. Due to the start of World War II and the death of his mother in 1943, E. Silinsh was forced to discontinue his education; nevertheless, in 1946 he took secondary school exams and enrolled at the Faculty of Chemistry of the State University of Latvia (SUL). The choice for natural sciences was rooted in Edgar's awareness of humanities being ideologically constrained in the Soviet Union. Yet he was forced to cease his studies even in the field of chemistry during the Stalinist repressions of 1949, because of class-based mistreatment. After that, E. Silinsh worked as a laborant for 14 years, and for last 12 of these he was employed at the Central Laboratory of the Riga Plant of Electrical Machine Building (Latvian: Rīgas Elektromašīnbūves rūpnīca, RER). At this institution, E. Silinsh could for the first time perform actual scientific research, mostly in the field of atomic spectroscopy. In 1958, his two messages were included in the X All-Union Spectroscopy Conference in Lvov. In total, Edgar Silinsh published 26 scientific and technical papers in the field of atomic and molecular spectroscopy during his years at RER, as well as 16 technical and technological publications of other kinds. During the "Khrushchev Thaw", Edgar Silinsh was finally able to enroll (in 1957) and graduate (in 1961) the Faculty of Physics and Mathematics of the University of Latvia. In 1962, he began his extramural studies for the Candidate of Sciences degree (equivalent to the Western PhD) at the S. Vavilov State Optical Institute in Leningrad and defended in June 1965. His Candidate thesis topic was influence of plasma and contact discharge on the emission spectra of metal atoms (doctoral advisor K. Taganov).

In 1963, the founder of Latvian Institute of Organic Synthesis Solomons Hillers proposed to create a joint research group of chemists and physicists in Riga to study electrophysical properties of organic compounds. Edgar Silinsh was appointed the head of this research group. Between 1963 and 1967 he was a researcher at the Laboratory of Semiconductor Physics Problems, SUL, whereas beginning with the year 1967 he led the Laboratory of Physics of Organic Semiconductors (later the Laboratory of Organic Solid State Physics and Molecular Electronics) at the Institute of Physical Energetics, Latvian Academy of Sciences. Until 1975, a new model was developed under his lead, describing the physical nature of local structure-determined charge-carrier trapping centers in organic molecular crystals. The most important publication of this period (71 Scopus citations) ushered in the collaboration with professor of the New York University Martin Pope and professor of Japanese National Institute of Natural Sciences Hiroo Inokuchi, later also with professor of the University of West Bohemia in Plzeň, Stanislav Nešpůrek.

In the following years, Edgar Silinsh took interest in the problems of organic solid state energetics and proved that the conventional band theory is inapplicable to molecular solids. A new, improved phenomenological model was also developed to describe these peculiarities. In 1978, these conclusions were summarized in a monograph, year later E. Silinsh defended his Doctor of Science thesis (equivalent to Western habilitation) on the topic, and in 1980 the improved and updated monograph was published by Springer, now available for Western readers. The last one is the most cited work of Edgar Silinsh in his whole life (218 citations as of June 2017), and Silinsh himself was once credited as the most cited Latvian author.

In the early 1980s, Edgar Silinsh was interested particularly in photogeneration mechanisms in organic semiconductors. In 1985, E. Silinsh published the molecular polaron model describing the lattice polarization effect on charge carriers; together with coworkers A. Jurģis and G. Šlihta developed the modified Sano—Mozumder model to describe the transfer of charge-carriers in the molecular semiconductor. Scientific endeavor of Edgar Silinsh embraced vast collaboration with the chemists of Riga Polytechnical Institute (later Riga Technical University) led by professor O. Neilands, as well as with the chemists of the Latvian Institute of Organic Synthesis, led by professor J. Freimanis. Total number of Edgar Silinsh's publications and scientific reports exceeds 200, in addition to six monographs, talks at over 20 scientific conferences and more than 50 lectures in the scientific establishments abroad. He has 710 citations listed in Scopus and h-index of 15. Edgar Silinsh was a member of American Physical Society, the Rotary club and some other international organizations; since 1992 — full member of the Latvian Academy of Sciences (LAS).

Edgars Imants Siliņš died on 26 May 1998, and is buried at the Līgatne cemetery. In the same year, the Prize in the field of Physics devoted to him was established by the LAS. In 2004, in front of the Institute of Physical Energetics (Aizkraukles St. 21, Riga) a monument to Edgar Silinsh was erected, designed by sculptors Juris Rapa and Zigrīda Rapa.

== Views and works in philosophy of science ==
Edgar Silinsh had much interest in Oriental philosophy (daoism, zen-buddhism), as well as in the traditional Japanese culture. He also revered the works of Niels Bohr in the field of philosophy of science, as well as (in the philosophical context) works of Dutch graphic artist Maurits Escher. In the year following the death of E. Silinsh, Jumava publishing house put in print his collection of essays on the matter, named "The Quest for the Great Truths" (Latvian: Lielo patiesību meklējumi).

== List of monographs ==
- О. Нейланд, Я. Страдынь, Э. Силиньш и др. Строение и таутомерные превращения β–дикарбонильных соединений. Зинатне: Рига, 1977, 444.с. (in Russian)
- Э. Силиньш. Электронные состояния органических молекулярных кристаллов. Зинатне: Рига, 1978, 344.с. (in Russian)
- E. A. Silinsh. Organic Molecular Crystals. Their Electronic States. Springer: Berlin/Heidelberg, 1980, 389 p.
- В. Андреев, M. Kурик, С. Нешпурек, Э. Силиньш, И. Чaпек и др. (под общей редакцией Э. Силиньша). Электронные процессы в органических молекулярных кристаллах: Явление поляризации и локализации. Зинатне: Рига, 1988, 329.с. (in Russian)
- Э. Силиньш, M. Kурик, И. Чaпек. Электронные процессы в органических молекулярных кристаллах: Перенос, захват, спиновые эффекты. Зинатне: Рига, 1992, 363.с. (in Russian)
- E. Siliņš, V. Čapek. Organic Molecular Crystals: Interaction, Localization, and Transport Phenomena. AIP Press, New York, 1994, 402 p.
- Lielo patiesību meklējumi. Esejas. Jumava: Rīga, 1999, 511 lpp. (Latvian)

== Awards ==
- Grand Medal of the Latvian Academy of Sciences "for establishing a new field and a school of physics of organic solid state, as well as for organizing efforts for the science of Latvia" (1997);
- M. Keldysh Prize by Latvian SSR Academy of Science (1984);
- An Edgar Silinsh Prize in Physics was established after his death in 1998 by the Latvian Academy of Sciences.

== Quotes ==
Revealing the truth is the end in itself of the science, as well as the justification of its existence. Hence a scientist must never lie. Lies shatter confidence in the statements of another scientist. Whereas without this confidence, collective collaboration in science is impossible. (1971)

Latvian: Patiesības atklāšana ir zinātnes pašmērķis un eksistences attaisnojums. Tāpēc zinātnieks nekad nedrīkst melot. Meli sagrauj uzticību cita zinātnieka apgalvojumiem. Bet bez šādas uzticības nav iespējama zinātnieku kolektīva sadarbība.
