= Viktors Arājs =

Latvian SS officer and Holocaust perpetrator

- Born: 13 January 1910; Baldone, Russian Empire (now Latvia)
- Died: 13 January 1988 (aged 78); Kassel, West Germany
- Known for: Leading the Arajs Kommando

Viktors Arājs (13 January 1910 – 13 January 1988) was a Latvian/Baltic German collaborator and Nazi SS SD officer who took part in the Holocaust during the German occupation of Latvia and Belarus as the leader of the Arajs Kommando, a collaborationist unit. The Arajs Kommando murdered about half of Latvia's Jews.

== Life ==
Viktors Bernhard Arājs was born on 13 January 1910 in the town of Baldone, then part of the Russian Empire (now Latvia). His father was a Latvian blacksmith and his mother came from a wealthy family of Baltic Germans. Arājs attended Jelgava Gymnasium, which he left in 1930 for mandatory national defense service in the Latvian Army. In 1932, Arājs studied law at the University of Latvia in Riga, but completed his degree only in 1941 after the Soviet occupation. He was a member of the elite student fraternity Lettonia, which may have helped him get a job with the Latvian police after he left the university. Arājs remained with the Latvian police until he left the service in 1938. During the Ulmanis' régime in Latvia, Arājs was a "low ranking provincial police officer" who, as a loyal administrator, dutifully "distanced himself officially from the Pērkonkrusts", the ultra-nationalist party in Latvia.

== Activities during World War II ==
The war between Germany and the Soviet Union began on 22 June 1941. Shortly afterwards, the Red Army abandoned Riga to the advancing Wehrmacht. Arājs then took over an abandoned police precinct house at 19 Valdemāra Street. Arājs' future commanders, Franz Stahlecker and Robert Stieglitz, had with them a Latvian translator, Hans Dressler, whom Arājs had known in high school and in the Latvian Army. Because of this friendship, Arājs was introduced to Stahlecker, got on their best side, and gained their trust. Arājs recruited the core of his troops from his student fraternity and Pērkonkrusts.

On 2 July, Arājs learned from Stahlecker during a conference that his unit had to unleash a pogrom that was supposed to appear spontaneous. On 4 July 1941, the German leadership turned loose "Security Group Arājs", generally referred to as the Arājs Kommando or Special Commando (Sonderkommando) Arājs. On the same day, the Germans ran a recruiting advertisement in the occupation-controlled Latvian language newspaper Tēvija (Fatherland): "To all patriotic Latvians, Pērkonkrusts members, Students, Officers, Militiamen, and Citizens, who are ready to actively take part in the cleansing of our country of undesirable elements" should enroll themselves at the office of the Security Group at 19 Valdemāra Street. On 4 July Arājs and his henchmen trapped about 20 Jews, who had not been able to take flight before the advancing Germans, in the Riga Synagogue on Gogoļa Street. There they were burnt alive while hand grenades were thrown through the windows. The Arājs commando consisted of 500–1500 volunteers. The unit murdered approximately 26,000 people, first in Latvia and then in Belarus. Arājs was promoted to police major in 1942, and in 1943 to SS-Sturmbannführer. Herberts Cukurs, the former Latvian pilot, was the adjutant to Arājs. The Arajs Kommando were notorious for their ill-treatment of women. Viktors Arājs raped a Jewish woman, Zelma Shepshelovitz, during the war. Her testimony served a crucial part in the trials of war criminals.

== Post-war ==
Until 1949, Arājs was interned in a British prisoner-of-war camp in Germany. After that he is rumored in some sources to have worked as a driver for the British in the British military government in Delmenhorst, then in the British occupation zone, but Richards Plavnieks, who extensively researched Arājs' life, believes this to be false. To the contrary, Arājs was due to be a major defendant in what British officials called the "Riga Ghetto Case", a mass trial of 16 war criminals to be conducted by a British military tribunal. Survivors spent years collecting testimonies for the trial, but British authorities dropped the case.

With assistance from the Latvian government-in-exile in London, Arājs took on the cover name of Victor (Viktors) Zeibots. He worked in Frankfurt am Main as an assistant at a printing company. On 21 December 1979, he was found guilty in the State Court of Hamburg (Landgericht Hamburg) of having on 8 December 1941 conducted the Jews of the greater Riga Ghetto to their deaths by the mass shootings in the Rumbula forest. For participation in the murder of 13,000 people, he was sentenced to life imprisonment. In 1988, Arājs died in solitary confinement in a prison in Kassel.
