= Ernesto Foldats =

Venezuelan botanist

Ernesto Foldats Andins
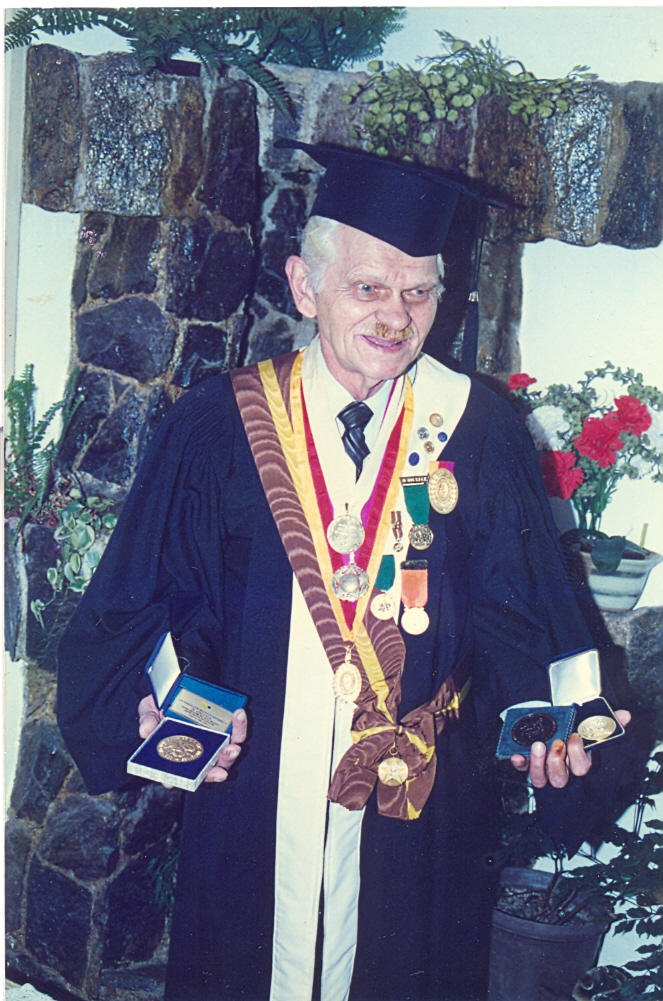
- Born: 15 May 1925; Liepāja, Latvia
- Died: 15 January 2003 (aged 77); Caracas, Venezuela
- Known for: Venezuelan flora, in particular orchids
- Scientific career
- Fields: Orchidologist
- Workplaces: Universidad Central de Venezuela
- Author abbrev. (botany): Foldats

Ernesto Foldats Andins (1925 – 2003) was a Venezuelan botanist and orchidologist. He was born in Latvia as Ernests Foldāts. He later moved to He has held numerous official positions, e.g. Director of the School of Biology, Dean of the Faculty of Science at the Universidad Central de Venezuela (1962–1968), and Scientific Advisor to the Commission on the Legislature and Environment. He was doctor honoris causa at the University of Riga, Latvia. Foldats was a member of the Latvian student fraternity Fraternitas Vanenica.

== Professional career ==
He undertook his initial studies at the Albert-Ludwigs-Universitaet Freiburg, Germany from 1945 to 1948. He moved to Venezuela in 1950, and graduated in Biological Sciences in 1954 at the Universidad Central de Venezuela. He was awarded a Guggenheim Fellowship in 1958. He eventually received his doctorate in 1964 at the same university after having undertaken post-graduate courses and work in the United States (1958–1959). His 1964 doctoral thesis, "Orchids of Venezuela", identified 70 new orchids and won the International Creole Prize and a monetary award of 10,000 dollars.. It was subsequently published in five volumes as La Flora de Venezuela las ORCHIDACEAE. He became a Fellow of the Linnean Society in 1993.

Main works

- Foldats, Ernesto (1969). Orchidaceae. Caracas: Edición Especial del Instituto Botanico. OCLC 608047.
- Foldats, Ernesto (1969). Contríbucíón a la Orquídíoflora de Venezuela. Caracas, Empresa "El Cojo". OCLC 77560622.
