= Liepa Parish =

Parish in Vidzeme, Latvia

- parish of Latvia
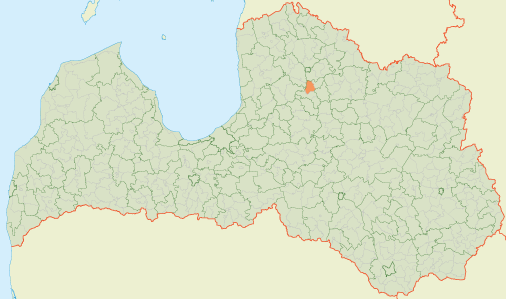
- Coordinates: 57°23′30″N 25°26′35″E
- Country: Latvia

Population (1 January 2026)
  - Total: 2,617
- Website: https://www.liepaspagasts.lv

Liepa Parish (Latvian: Liepas pagasts) is an administrative territorial entity of Cēsis Municipality in the Vidzeme region of Latvia. Prior to 2009, it was an administrative unit of the former Cēsis district.

== History ==
Liepa Parish was established on the territory of the former Liepa Manor (Lindenhof). In 1925, a section of the former Skangaļi Manor of Mūrmuiža Parish was added to Liepa Parish. In 1935, Cēsis County had an area of 68.9 km^{2} and a population of 1262 inhabitants.

During the Soviet occupation, in 1945 Dunduri village and Liepas village councils were established, but were dissolved in 1949. That same year, the Cēsis district was established from a part of the former county. In 1954, the Dunduri village was added to Liepa village. In 1990 the village was reorganized into a parish.

From 2009 until 2021, Liepa Parish was part of the former Priekuļi Municipality. Since 1 July 2021, the Parish is a part of Cēsis Municipality.

== Towns, villages and settlements of Liepa parish ==
- Dukuļi
- Liepa
- Liepasmuiža
- Obuļi
- Sarkaņi
- Saulītes
- Skangaļi
- Stuķi

== See also ==
- Liepa Manor
