= Veselava Parish =

Parish in Priekuļi Municipality, Vidzeme, Latvia

- parish of Latvia
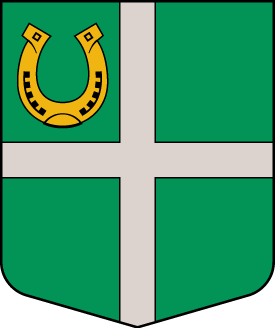
- Coat of arms

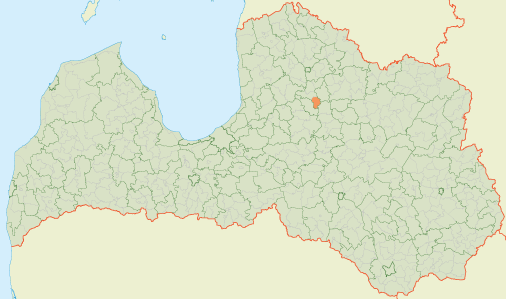
- Coordinates: 57°16′07″N 25°32′03″E
- Country: Latvia

Population (1 January 2026)
  - Total: 453

Veselava Parish (Latvian: Veselavas pagasts) is an administrative unit of Cēsis Municipality in the Vidzeme region of Latvia.

== Towns, villages and settlements of Veselava Parish ==
- Veselava - parish administrative center
- Bērzkrogs - town
- Pauļi - village
- Mežgaļi - village
- Stirnas - village
- Zeikariv - village
