= Corps Concordia Rigensis =

German Baltic student association

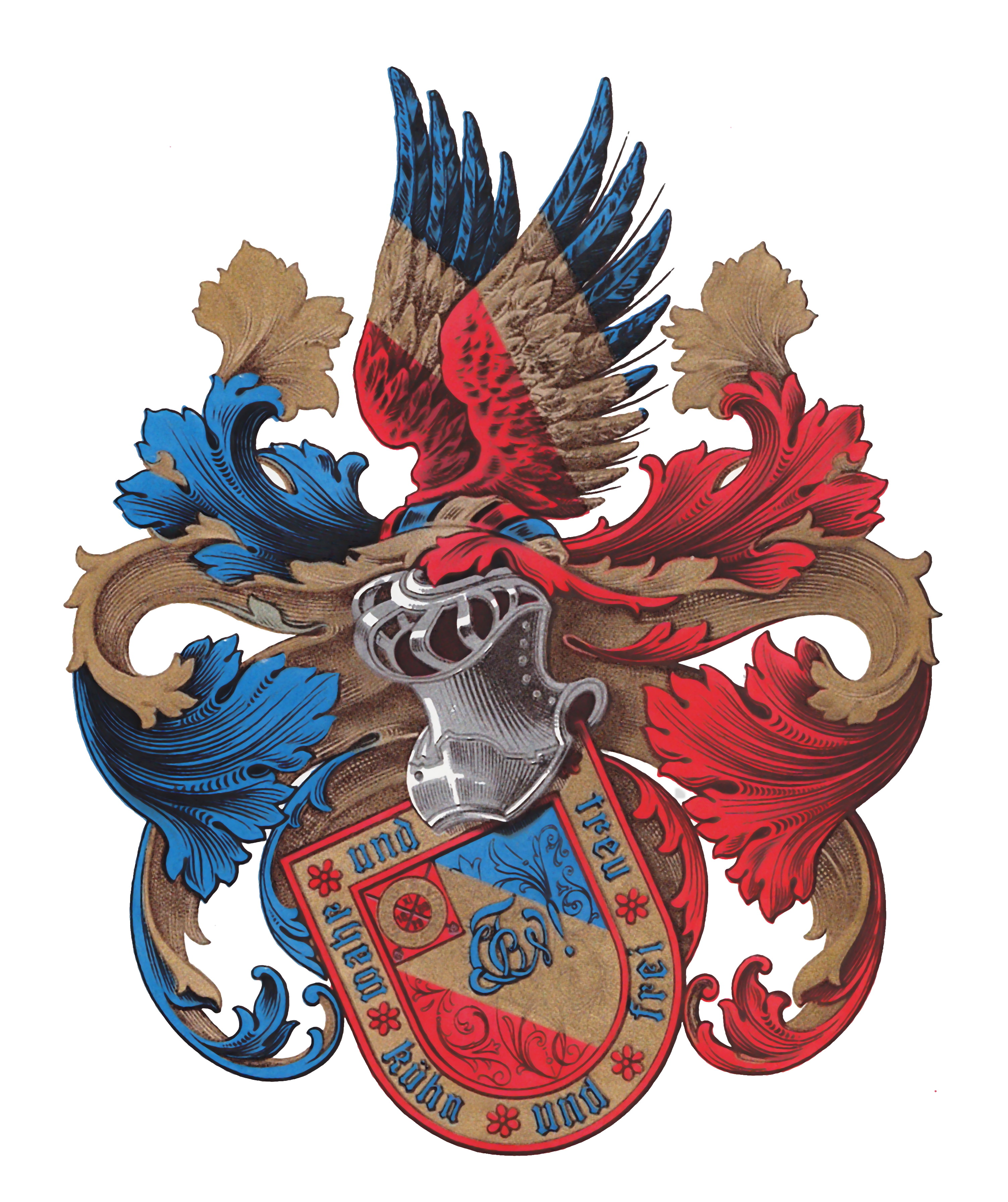
- Founded: November 29, 1869; 156 years ago University of Riga
- Type: Studentenverbindung
- Affiliation: KSCV
- Status: Active
- Scope: Local
- Motto: Wahr und treu – kühn und frei sowie Viribus units "True and Faithful – Bold and Free with United Forces"
- Colors: Royal blue, Goldenrod and Crimson
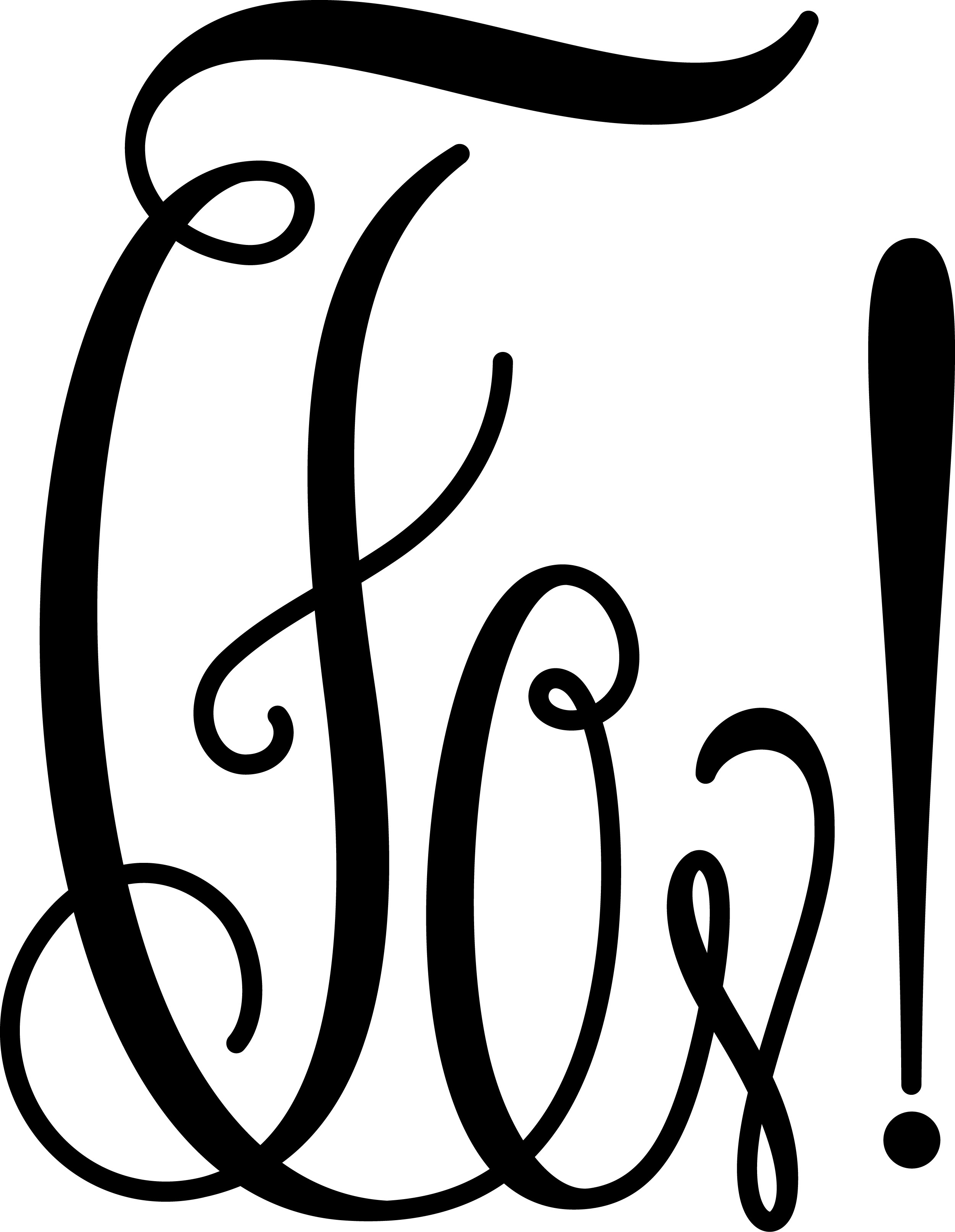
- Zirkel
- Chapters: 1
- Headquarters: Tarpenbekstraße 140; Hamburg 20251; Germany
- Website: www.concordia-rigensis.de

The Corps Concordia Rigensis is a German Baltic student association founded at the University of Riga in Riga, Latvia in 1869. It has been based in Hamburg since 1956 and has been a member of the Kösener Senioren-Convents-Verband since 1959. The international corps members are called Concords and form a cross-generational, lifelong bond of friendship.

== History ==
=== Riga ===
The Concordia Rigensis was founded on November 29, 1869, in Riga by members of the Fraternitas Baltica at the University of Riga as the second German student association. Together with Rubonia, founded in 1875, and Fraternitas Marcomannia (1902), these four formed the first connections for German students in what was then Russian Riga.

On January 24, 1870, Concordia was a co-founder of the Rigenser Chargierte-Convent. Some of the members left in the winter semester of 1880/81 to found Selonia. Concordia left the Charged Convent on October 27, 1906, and was readmitted on March 27, 1907. Due to the war, it was suspended in the summer semester of 1915 and reconstituted on October 14, 1918. The Charged Convent was re-established.

From January 31, 1919, to September 1920, Concordia was suspended due to the war. In 1921, it was admitted to the (Latvian) Presidential Convention. Concordia resigned from the Presidential Convention on October 30, 1922, and took part in the reconstitution of the Charged Convention the following day. From July 6, 1924, to May 14, 1932, it was again a member of the Presidential Convention.

In the first year of the World War II, the German-Soviet non-aggression pact added the Baltics to the Soviet area of influence, and the resettlement of the German-Baltic people was ordered. Therefore, the corps was suspended on October 14, 1939, but plans were made to reactive the Concordia Rigensis when the opportunity arose. However, reactivation was prevented by politics after the resettlement where the only organization allowed by the state was an old gentlemen's association.

=== Hamburg ===
Due to the Soviet occupation of Latvia, the Corps' return to Riga was impossible. Therefore, the Corps was reconstituted in Hamburg, Germany on October 13, 1956. Since May 22, 1958, the Corps has participated in the Hamburg Senior Citizens' Convention. It was adopted into the Kösener Senioren-Convents-Verband on June 10, 1959, and accepted into the Kösener Senioren-Convents-Verband (KSCV). From December 1, 1970, to November 29, 1984, the Corps was suspended due to a lack of young talent.

Concordia Rigensis is one of the few German-Baltic student associations that have survived. Today, there are three remaining German-Baltic student associations: the Concordia Rigensis, the Fraternitas Dorpatensis in Munich (founded in 1948), and the Curonia Goettingensis (founded in 1959). All three corporations are members of the Baltic Philistine Association.

Like the other two German-Baltic student associations, Concordia Rigensis maintains active connections with the Baltics after the fall of the Iron Curtain and is actively involved in the German-Baltic Völkerkommersen, which it organized in Hamburg in 1996, 2005, and 2016.

Since its founding in 1971, numerous members have come from the Helmut-Schmidt-Universität and were or still are active officers in the Bundeswehr. Due to this high military proportion, the Concordia Rigensis is unique in the KSCV, and is unofficially referred to there as a military or officer corps.

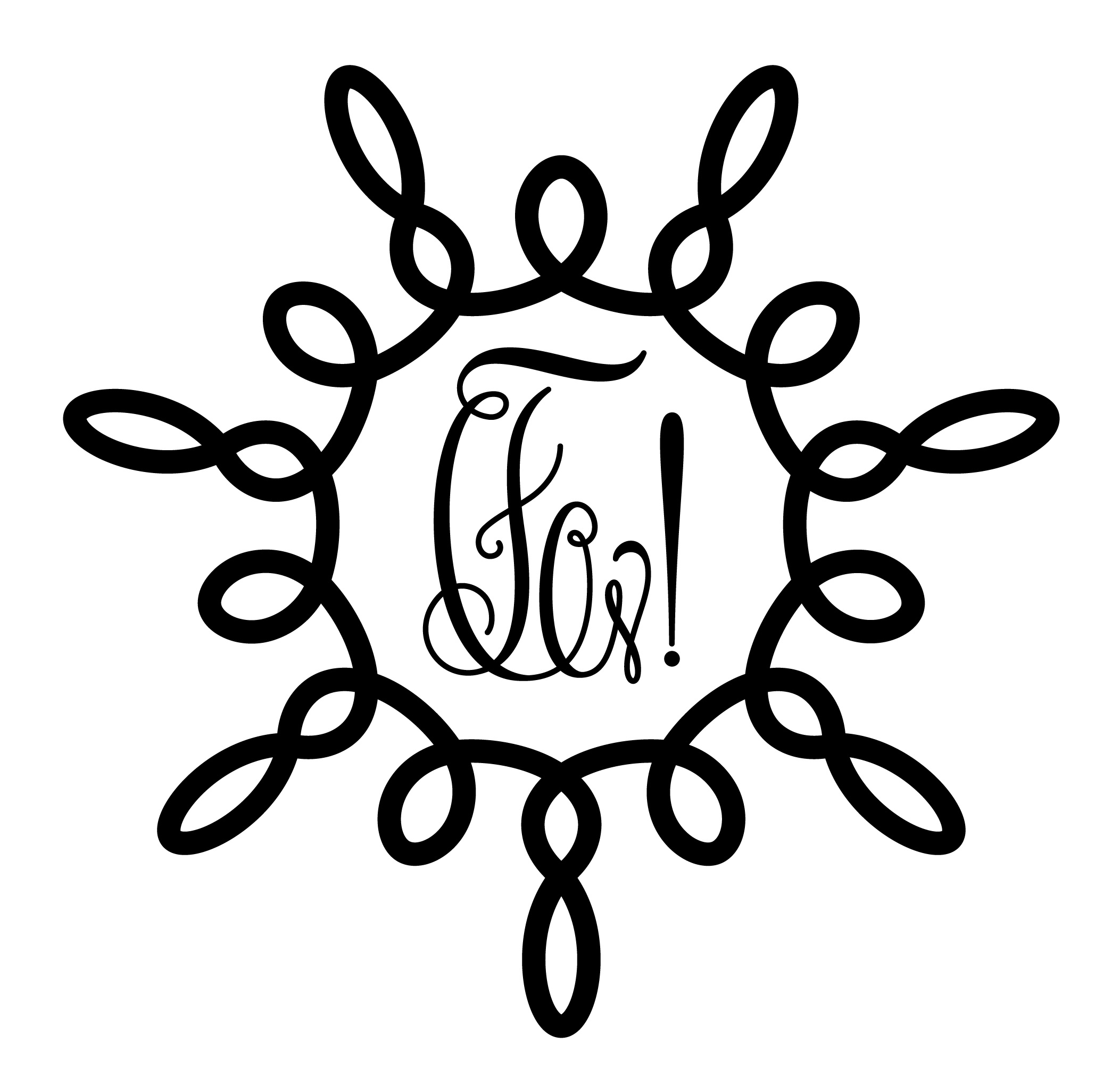
Baltenstern der Concordia Rigensis

== Symbols and traditions ==
The color band of Concordia Rigensis is blue-gold-red with a width of 2 cm, which is typical for the Baltics. A colored ribbon with a width of 2.7 cm is worn at Kommersen. Members were a small dark blue student cap with a gold, embroidered star called a Baltenstern. As is common in the Baltics, the Concord foxes do not wear a fox ribbon, but only a black lid with a special silver brooch on the side.

The Corps' motto is Wahr und treu – kühn und frei sowie Viribus units or "True and Faithful - Bold and Free with United Forces".

All Baltic corps have significant differences when compared to other student associations based in Germany. Terms and behavior date back to the early days of the connection system in the 18th and early 19th centuries, which have been more or less preserved in the Baltics. For example, the Fox Major is called the Oldermann, probably based on the Olderman of the guilds of the Hanseatic cities. In addition, the corporation house is called the Convent Quarters (German: Conventsquartier).

The corps also values the preservation of old student songs. The Baltic pub also does not have the formal procedure that developed in the German Empire. In addition, with a Russian influence, vodka and Baltic specialties such as pierogi are also offered.

== Related organizations ==
=== Cartels ===
A cartel had existed since 1909 with the German-Baltic Corps Nevania from St. Petersburg (founded in 1847), to which the Corps Rubonia also belonged. In 1970, the last seven Philistines of the Corps Nevania transferred their traditions and archives to Concordia Rigensis, with the obligation to keep the memory of this corps alive as an example of German-Baltic corps history from Russia.

=== Friendly corporations ===
- There has been a friendship agreement with the Fraternitas Lataviensis (founded in 1926) in Riga since 1996. It resides in the old Concordia Rigensis Convent Quarters in Riga.
- There was also a friendship treaty with the Fraternitas Baltica (founded in Riga in 1865) in 1958.

=== Baltic Philistine Association ===
Dating to 1951, the Baltic Philistine Association is the corporate association of Baltic corporations from Dorpat and Riga. The Baltic Philistine Association belongs to Corps Concordia Rigensis, Corps Curonia Goettingensis, and the Baltic Corporation Fraternitas Dorpatensis in Munich.

== See also ==
- Bucerius Law School
- Helmut-Schmidt-Universität
- List of student corporations in Latvia
