= Lettonia (corporation) =

Latvian student fraternity

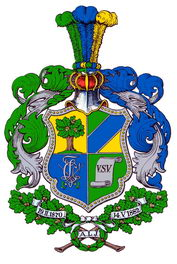
- Founded: February 19, 1870; 156 years ago, reestablished 1989; Tartu University formerly in Latvian: Tērbatas Universitāte
- Type: Literary and fencing
- Affiliation: Independent
- Status: Active
- Scope: Local
- Motto: Vitam, salutem, veritatem "Life, prosperity, truth" Acti labores jucundi "Labors accomplished are pleasant"
- Colors: Olive Green, Blue, and Gold
- Symbol: Rapier
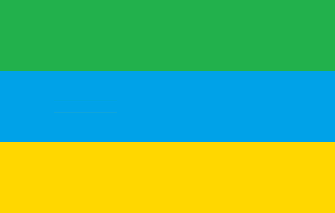
- Flag
- Chapters: 1
- Members: 400 active
- Headquarters: Rūpniecības iela 4a Riga LV-1010; Latvia
- Website: lettonia.lv

Lettonia is a student corporation (~fraternity) that unites students of various academic courses and older graduates - called "philistines" - following national and patriotic ideals, and building mutual friendship rooted in common principles.

Lettonia is considered the oldest Latvian student corporation. The history of Lettonia began in the era of the Latvian national awakening, when Latvian students had the opportunity to study. Already in 1870, a library was founded in Tērbata and the first theater performance in Latvian was organized. The 5th, 6th, 7th and 8th editions of the collections of articles by Juris Alunāns "Sēta, Daba, Pasaule" were published, as well as a series of encyclopedic collections of articles "Latvju tauta" edited by Vilis Olavs, as well as the first collection of student songs in Latvian.

== Motto ==
The mottos of Lettonia are "Acti labores jucundi" (from Latin "Labours accomplished are pleasant") and "Vitam, salutem, veritatem" ("To life, prosperity and truth").

== Colours ==
During the history of Lettonia, three different color combinations were considered as the colors of the corporation. At the beginning of Lettonia, history student J. Grīnbergs proposed to adopt red-white-red as the first colors, based on the colors of the Cēsis Latvian Guards war flag mentioned in the Livonian Rhymed Chronicle, which was red with a white stripe in the middle (in 1279). Since the colors of all corporations traditionally followed the tricolor (3 different colors), in order to meet these requirements, they were changed to red-white-gold. In later years, the red "dekel" surface became unacceptable to the tsarist regime, so on March 11, 1882, the colors were changed to green-blue-gold, which were finally approved on April 24, 1882.

The explanation of the last and current colors is:

green — from the flags of Vidzeme and Courland

blue — from the flag of Courland

gold — from the old tricolor

== History ==
=== In Tērbata (Modern-day Tartu) (1870–1918) ===
In 1870, Atis Kronvalds and his fellow Latvian students founded the Tērbatas Latvian students' writing evenings. On February 18, 1870, at the initiative of A. Kronvalds, about 20 Latvian students sent a congratulatory telegram on the occasion of the consecration of the new building of the Riga Latvian Society. All the signatories of the telegram gathered on the evening of February 19, 1870, to celebrate the Riga Latvian Society's celebration. It was on this evening that the Tērbatas Latvian students' writing evenings were born, which can be considered the beginnings of Lettonia. The goals of the evenings were also determined: the promotion of the spiritual development of the Latvian people, the study of history, as well as the development of the language and schools. True, on December 3, 1881, these evenings adopted the name Fraternitas Lettonica, and on March 20, 1882, the final name Lettonia, which has been preserved to this day.

On May 10, 1882, the senior of the Tērbatas Chargétés convention announced that Lettonia had been admitted as a full member, and on May 13, 1882, the vice-rector of the University of Tartu and the curator of the educational district, Senator A. Stackelbergs, gave Lettonia official approval of the administration, and on May 14, 1882, Lettonia's first public appearance in colors took place, which is marked as the date of the unveiling of the colors.

Understanding the growing role of Latvian corporations, on November 8, 1882, Lettonians declared the goals of Lettonia's activities:

1. Lettonia wants to be a home for the writing evenings of Latvian students in Tērbata, a home and a place of education for Latvian students and their guardian,
2. Lettonia is the nucleus of the educated part of the Latvian people in Tērbata, whose task is to ensure the well-being and prosperity of the Latvian people.
3. Lettonia emphasizes the need to maintain a national spirit both from a principled and practical standpoint.

In 1884, in the second semester, Lettonia presided over the Chargéto Convention (C!C!), which at that time included all existing corporations — German, Latvian, Russian, Polish. In the events of 1905, German corporators participated on the Cossack side, thus conflicts arose between the Latvian and German corporations, as a result of which Lettonia was excluded from the Chargéto Convention. However, Lettonia had the right to openly wear its colors, based on the declaration made on behalf of the Emperor by the then Minister of Education of the Russian Empire, V. Glazov. During World War I, in 1915, all corporations were denied the right to wear colors, including Latvians.

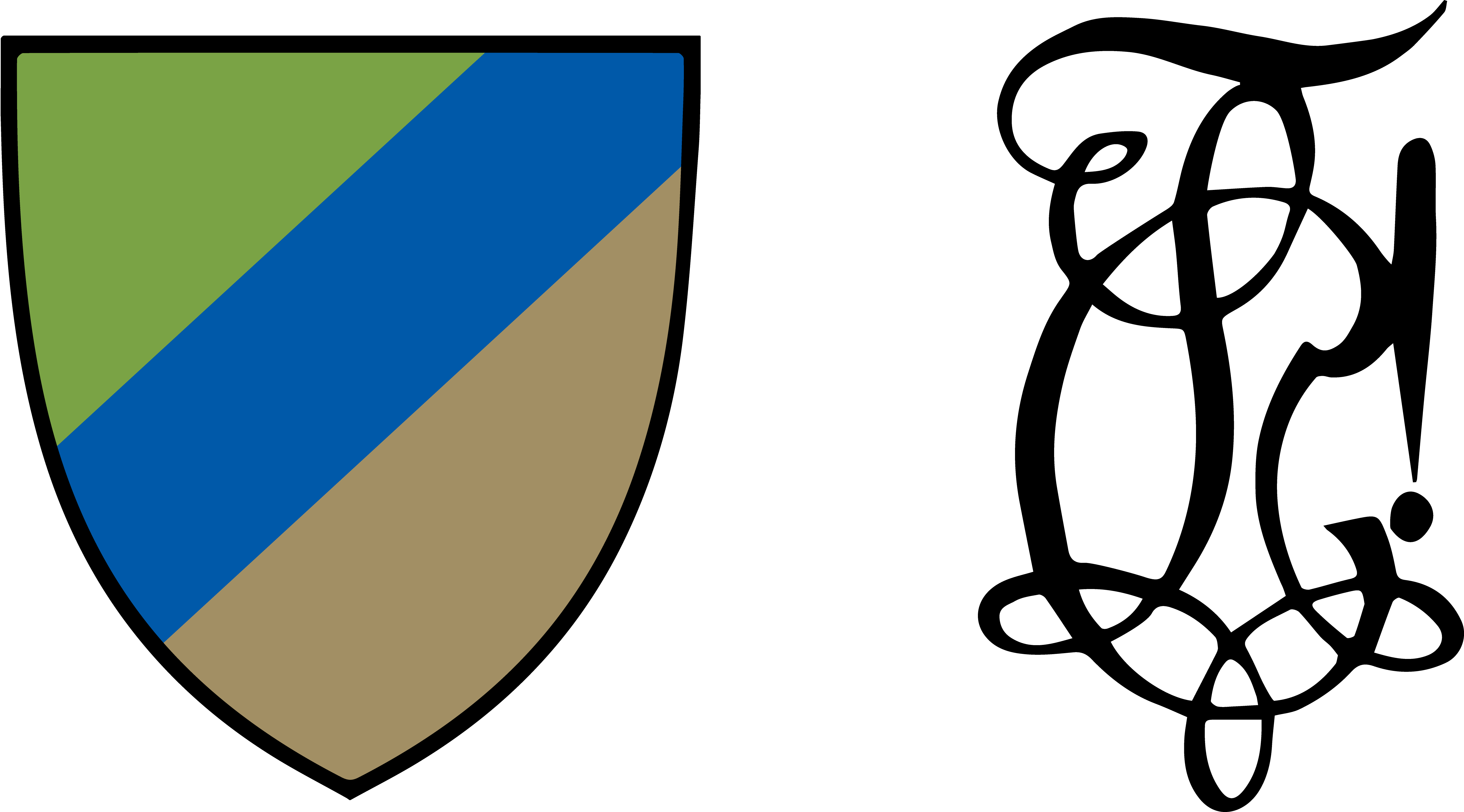
Lettonia colour shield un Cirkel with first letters from the motto "Vivat, Crescat, Floreat Lettonia!"

=== In Riga (1918–1940) ===
At the beginning of the Latvian freedom struggle, the Lettonia group arrived in Riga by train on December 3, 1918 and immediately put themselves at the disposal of the Latvian Provisional Government. Many Latvians, with weapons in their hands, demonstrated their patriotism in the Latvian liberation struggle. During these struggles, about 132 Lettonians joined various units of the Latvian National Armed Forces, 6 Lettonians also joined the Student Company. Of these Lettonians, 19 were awarded the Lāčplēsis War Order.

Initially, in 1920, a house was rented for living at Ģertrūdes Street 6, but by selling the house in Tērbata, money was obtained to buy their own, larger house. In 1921, Lettonia purchased a building at 55 Valdemāra Street, where they moved in the second semester of the same year. In external life, Lettonians were very active in both state life and social and sports organizations, as well as being involved in the founding of the Presidium Convention. In the 1920s, Lettonia also grew very rapidly, as more than 100 members were admitted to the first three coetus.

The most famous Lettonians during this period were 1 President of the Republic (Alberts Kviesis), 1 Prime Minister (Voldemārs Zāmuēls), 5 ministers, 9 members of the Saeima, 4 envoys abroad, 44 university lecturers (including 17 professors, 4 rectors of the University of Latvia, 3 vice-rectors, 9 deans of university faculties), as well as many military doctors and representatives of other professions (statistics are accurate until 1930).

Lettonians were very active in the establishment of the Latvian fraternity magazine "Universitas" and the first editor was Aleksandrs Plensners. Lettonia also helped and guaranteed their coman to 6 new Latvian fraternities (Beveronija, Philyronia, Fraternitas Academica, Fraternitas Lataviensis and Fraternitas Livonica).

On May 15, 1934, Kārlis Ulmanis staged a coup d'état and Latvia ceased to exist as a parliamentary republic. During Ulmanis' regime, corporations had to be very careful, because they could not accept the suppression of freedom of speech. Excessive praise and veneration of a person was also not customary in the academic community. One Lettonian suffered for making leaflets against Vilhelms Munters. Andrējs Švēdis, st.oec. 27.II, was already arrested in 1936 and, with the formation of Soviet power in Latvia, he was transferred from prison to the penal institutions of the USSR. A. Švēdis was deported, but his further fate is unknown.

=== During World War II (1940–1944) ===
When the occupation of Latvia began, the corporations were closed and their property confiscated. The corporations' inventory was looted, and most of the Lettonians (especially those who were in the army) were subjected to various repressions. Many lost their jobs, were arrested, murdered, or deported. Some Lettonians and their families managed to emigrate together with the Baltic Germans, but some left illegally by boat to Sweden or remained abroad.

When the Germans invaded the USSR, Latvia also came under their control. To achieve their goals in Latvia, the Nazis established, among other things, the infamous Arajs Commando. In the early days of the Arajs Commando, Viktor Arajs' connections with student fraternities played an important role in its formation, as Arajs himself had been a member of Lettonia since 1935. Some of the team's leaders were members of Lettonia: Arvīds Dīkmanis, Konstantīns Kaķis, Boriss Kinslers, and Herberts Cukurs were Lettonians. In 2000, Lettonia adopted a declaration condemning "any repression and crimes against humanity committed during World War II."

Lettonia building was taken over by the University of Riga. In Germany, fraternities were closed, and Lettonia could not officially resume its activities, but Philistine Aid Societies were permitted. After lengthy correspondence with the authorities, t/l F! P! B! deputy chairman Georgs Apinis-Dienstmanis (Knight of the Order of Lāčplēsis, awarded for the battle of Piņķi on May 22, 1919) achieved that on July 15, 1943, Lettonia F! P! B! resumed its activities. Fil! Georgs Apinis-Dienstmanis was elected as commander, and the association's headquarters were located at 16-7 Vaļņu Street in Riga. However, during this period, komerss and unofficial meetings took place both at the restaurant "Mazais Vērmanes dārzs" and in apartments. The last komerss meeting in Lettonia took place on February 19, 1944.

Before the war, there were about 550 Lettonians in Latvia. After the war, about 80 Lettonians were deported, 18 were shot, and about 325 were forced to emigrate to Western countries.

=== Post-war period (1944–1988) ===
After World War II ended, Lettonians abroad began to identify the locations of all their members. It was the most critical time in the history of Lettonia, as external conditions were extremely unfavorable. Naturally, Lettonians wanted to stick together, and several centers were established in the American and British zones. A unified convention began in the first semester of 1947 in Esslingen, or as it was called, "Little Riga." This was the largest Latvian colony. The primary goal of the Lettonia convent was to establish and manage Lettonian academic life in Germany. There were 253 Lettonians in Germany and 73 outside of it. On February 18, 1948, Aleksandrs Plensners gave a presentation on the tasks of Lettonians in exile. At the same meeting, officers and council representatives from other countries and occupation zones were elected. New fraternities were founded at the Baltic University. During this period, Fraternitas Cursica guaranteed the Lettonia United Fraternity. Friendship was renewed with the Estonian fraternity Fraternitas Estica and the Lithuanian academic unit Neo-Lithuania. A joint family evening was organized by Lettonia and Selonia. On March 5, 1949, the statutes of the "Latvian Fraternity Association" were adopted as a newly created joint organization in exile.

With most Lettonians emigrating to the US, the convent decided to move its headquarters to New York. In 1950, the Little Album Lettonorum was published, symbolically ending the German phase and beginning the convent's activities in North America. The majority of Lettonians lived in the US, and from 1950 to 1990, the headquarters of the Lettonia convent was located in the US (36 years) and in Canada (4 years). Activities took place in 14 groups in the US, 2 in Canada, and 6 in Australia and Europe.

Although it was not easy, Lettonians managed to settle all the legal issues for the incorporation and organization of an official corporation, finding new forms of managing the convent and connecting all Latvians. The community where the convent was based was considered the global community, and the leaders took care of organizing and managing Lettonia's work in other communities. New boys were accepted, and the community continued to grow. The Lettonia Council operated according to the Regulations for Lettonia's activities outside Latvia, adopted in 1966. A global Lettonia aid fund was established, and in 1952 it was decided to publish Vita Nostra, whose main task was to provide information to Lettonians. In 1977, the Kronvalda Fund was established. All of these activities made it possible to maintain the Latvian spirit and preserve the Latvian language in exile. Lettonia's activities in exile are described in detail in the album "Lettonia 1870-1990," published in New York in 1992.

However, those Lettonians who remained in their homeland met at funerals and in apartments, where space permitted. After returning from the Gulag camps, exile, and following the amnesty in 1955, the Lettonian community in Latvia grew. Fil! Edgars Liepiņš (oec. 30. II) became the de facto senior member and led the Lettonian meetings until he left for England to join his family. In the second semester of 1977, fil!K. Asers rer. nat. 30. II took over the duties of senior. K. Asers skillfully led the members of Lettonia during the periods of "post-cult" and "stagnation." In recognition of his achievements, the convention elected him as Honorary Senior.

=== Modern times ===
On November 11, 1988, representatives of the oldest fraternities arrived in Airītes to honor fallen heroes, which many consider to be the official restoration of fraternity activities in Latvia. This fact is also confirmed by the fact that, upon returning home, representatives of the five oldest fraternities decided to resume their activities. On May 18, 1989, 12 members of Lettonia adopted the renewed statutes of Lettonia, which were submitted to the University of Latvia by Nikolajs Bulders, Konstantīns Asers, Aleksandrs Kļaviņš, and Pēteris Grots. and on July 4, LU Rector Juris Zaķis allowed Lettonia to resume its activities at the University of Latvia.

Lettonia accepted its first post-occupation members in Riga in the second semester of 1989. Since then, convents have been held regularly, and new members are accepted each semester. When the National Guard was established, its Student Company (currently the Student Battalion) was formed, which includes younger and older members of Lettonia. The literary evening resumed its activities on November 6, 1989.

In 2016, after conflicts with P!K! two former student corporations from Tartu and Riga C!C! Lettonia and Talavija decided to leave P!K! and re-establish the Šaržēto konvents, which was registered in the Latvian Register of Associations and Foundations on September 23, 2016.

Currently, there are quite a few Lettonians working in various ministries, state administration institutions, banks, and economic institutions. Lettonia receives considerable support from Lettonians living abroad. Any Latvian university student aged 18 or older can become a member of Lettonia. Lettonia members cannot be members of organizations that cultivate "anti-state, anti-national, and anti-religious activities and whose activities contradict the spirit and traditions of Lettonia." Lettonia members cannot be members of other student corporations. Before being accepted, prospective members must attend a visit, which takes place twice a year — at the beginning of each semester.
