= Fraternitas Lataviensis =

Latvian student fraternity

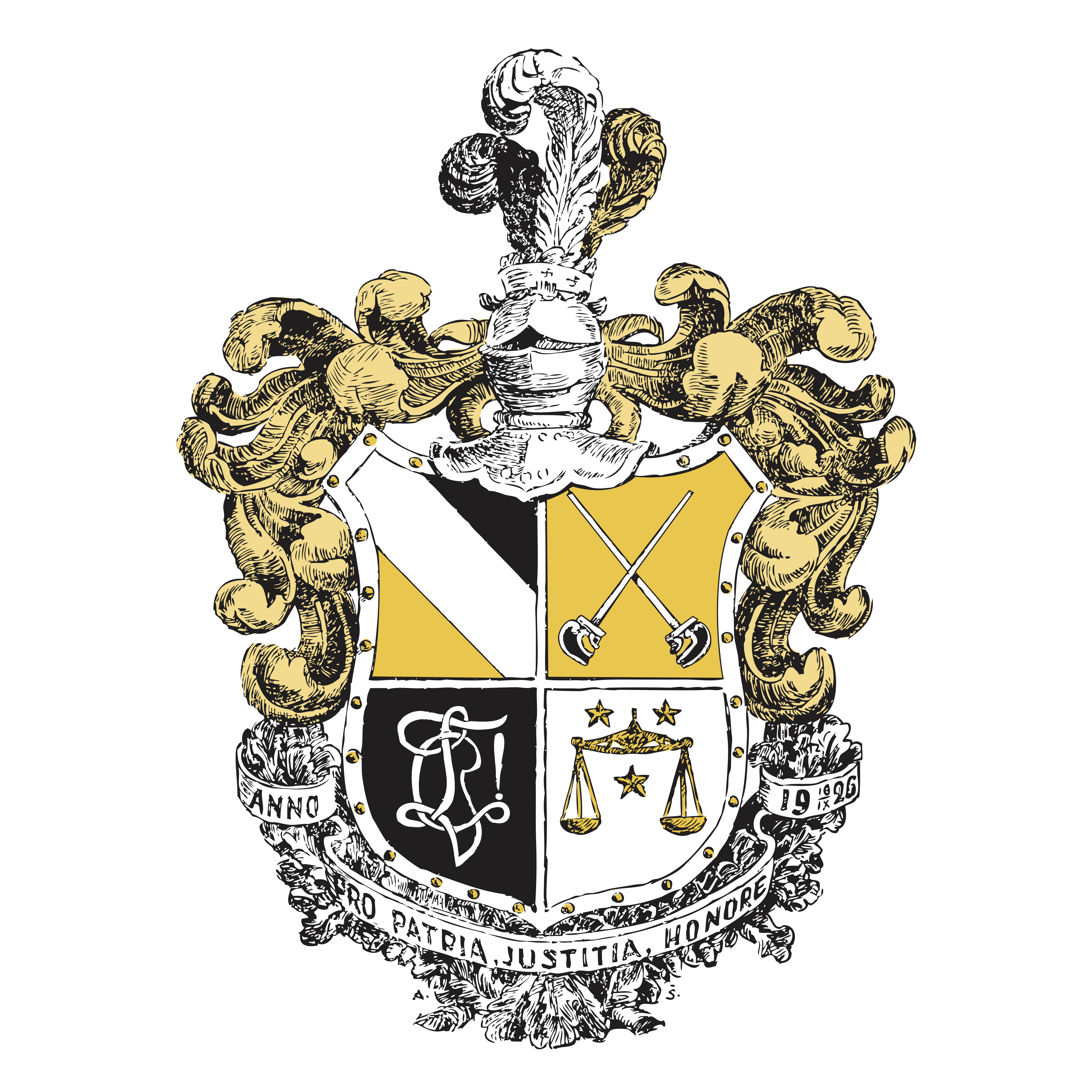
- Founded: 16 September 1926; 99 years ago University of Latvia
- Type: Academic corporation
- Affiliation: P!K!
- Status: Active
- Scope: Local
- Motto: Pro patria, iustitia, honore! "For the fatherland, justice, honor!”
- Colors: Black, White and Gold
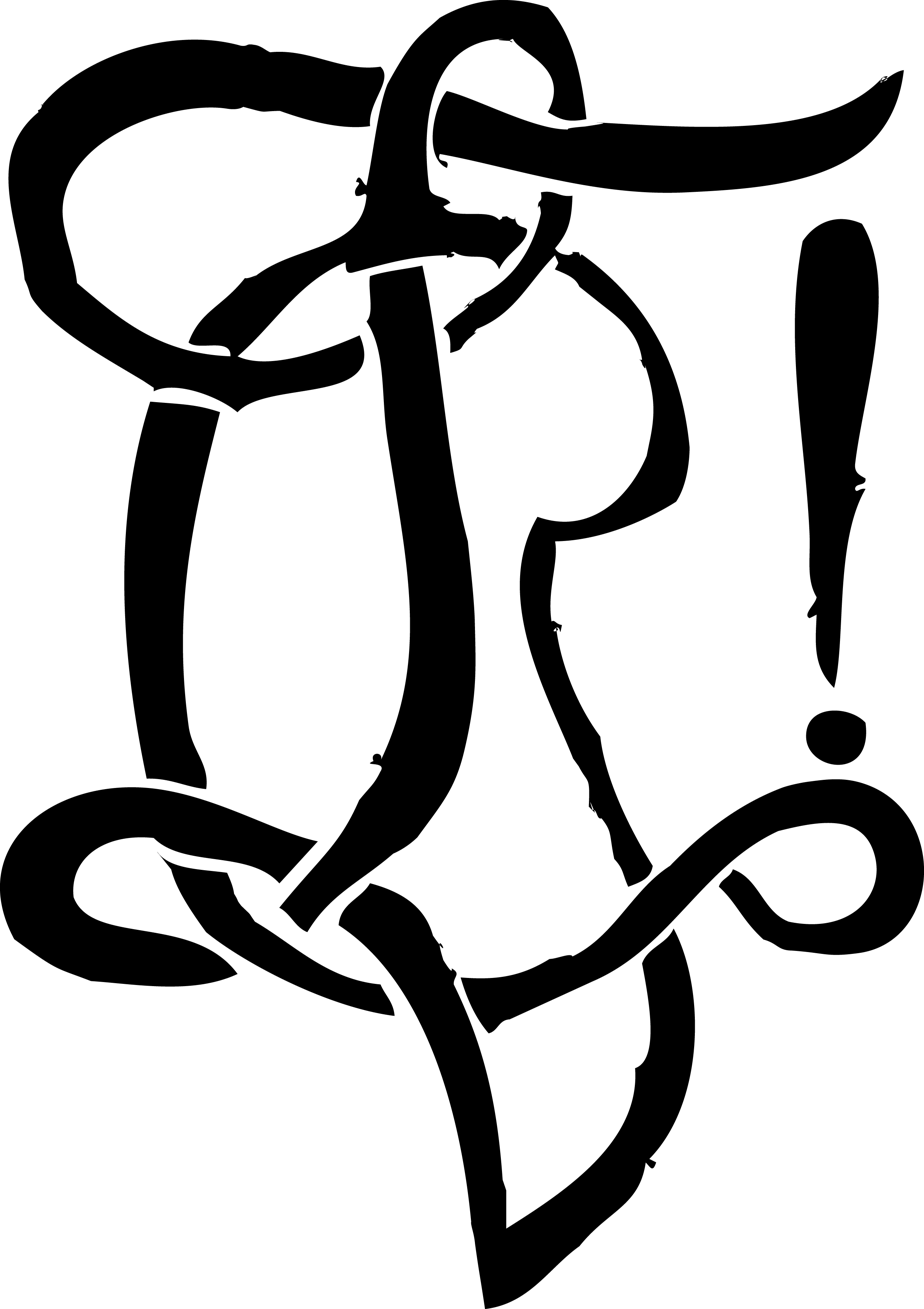
- Zirkel
- Chapters: 1
- Members: ~900 lifetime
- Headquarters: Aldaruiela 7 Riga; Latvia
- Website: pk.lv/WordPress/fraternitas-lataviensis/

Fraternitas Lataviensis is a student organization, known as a corporation, which differs from American fraternities. Its goals as formulated in 1939 are: “To gather under our flag students from the University of Latvia, to raise in tradition and garner national and cultural unity as good citizens and public figures, to consciously hone responsibility within community, honour the mind, togetherness and friendship and tactful social values, to encourage towards knowledge and art, as well as Sporting activities encouraging members' physical development.”

To this day the corporation's goals and principles have survived: “To gather University of Latvia and other Higher education students of Latvian origin, to educate them in good faith, in the nobility of spirit, and in the national spirit and later in life to unite in friendship.”

== History ==
In 1926, Fraternitas Lataviensis was founded by 28 university students in Riga (including several abstainers). Its original name was “Latavia” and its colours were black, blue, and gold. However, in order to be accepted as a fraternity by the Presidium Konvent, Fraternitas Lataviensis needed to change its name and colours to prevent confusion with other fraternities. After the group made the changes, they were accepted into the Presidium Konvent on November 20, 1928. Fraternitas Lataviensis continued to grow during the interwar period.

Shortly after the beginning of the first Soviet occupation of Latvia in 1940, the Soviet Latvian government banned all operations of Fraternitas Lataviensis. Fraternitas Lataviensis property was nationalized and materials (flags, coat of arms, printed material) were confiscated, though several members hid Fraternitas Latavienis materials and continued to operate. During the Nazi occupation of Latvia, Fraternitas Lataviensis's Filister Aid Society operated unofficially.

While Fraternitas Lataviensis remained banned in Soviet Latvia, it renewed operations abroad. Many members fled Latvia at the close of World War Two and renewed operations in the diaspora. The first formal Fraternitas Lataviensis meeting occurred in the Zedelgem prisoner-of-war camp in Belgium in fall 1945. The first kovent outside of Latvia was held in Stockholm, Sweden on February 16, 1948. However, it was only in 1951 that Fraternitas Lataviensis began accepting new members into the fraternity. With diaspora Latvians living across the globe, a Global Presidium was founded in 1965 to manage the numerous chapters. Chapters of Fraternitas Lataviensis were founded in Australia, Brazil, Canada, Germany, Sweden, the United Kingdom, and the United States. Since the restoration of Latvia's independence and due to shrinking diaspora populations, Fraternitas Lataviensis' global chapters have started to suspend activities. Currently, the largest chapter outside of Latvia is in Toronto with approximately 90 active members.

When Latvia regained independence in 1991, Latvian university students and Fraternitas Lataviensis members were keen on renewing operations. With assistance from the Global Presidium, Fraternitas Lataviensis was able to purchase property in Old Riga (the former central quarters of Concordia Rigensis) and quickly restart operations.

== Symbols ==
The motto of the fraternity is Pro patria, iustitia, honore! or "For the fatherland, justice, honor!". Originally, the colours of the corporation Fraternitas Lataviensis used in regalia (color distinguishing signs) were black, blue and gold. This colour scheme was used until 1928, when it was changed to black, white, and gold due to concerns of confusion raised by other corporations with similar colour schemes. There are two different explanations of the meaning of these colours. According to the coat of arms of Fraternitas Lataviensis and the motto: Black represents the fatherland; white, justice; and gold, honor. According to the flag song "Friends, brothers, give your hands": black represents certainty; white, the truth; gold, honesty and man's virtue. Other distinctive signs include the flag, coat of arms, colour shield, colour ribbons, sash, insignia, headgear (deckel), and colour rapier.

The members of the corporation Fraternitas Lataviensis follow the traditions that have been cultivated since the foundation of the corporation in their everyday and festive operations. There are various different elements in the regulated course of events, including the festive songs, exclamations, etc. typical of Fraternitas Lataviensis.

== Organizational structure ==
The student fraternity Fraternitas Lataviensis consists of the Convent and the Philister Society. The fraternity's activities are regulated by a constitution called “komāns”. The active members participate in the Convent. The Convent is lead and represented by Presidium, which consists of three elected positions – the chair (“I šaržētais”), the vice-chair (“II šaržētais”) and the secretary (“III šaržētais”). The elected alderman is in charge of educating the younger members of the organization (“the boys”) into the ways of the fraternity, by teaching them the rules and passing on traditions.

Other elected positions in the convent are responsible for different activities in the fraternity (quartermaster, treasurer, judges, master of song or magister cantandi, master of fencing or magister paucandi, etc.). The Philister Society unites graduates. It has been incorporated on 19 October 1927, as fraternity's Fraternitas Lataviensis Philister Aid Society. During the Soviet occupation of Latvia during World War II, on 13 July 1940, the Philister society was closed down, it was briefly and partly restored during the Nazi occupation of Latvia. On 22 June 1993, the fraternity's Fraternitas Lataviensis Philister Aid Society was restored.

On 20 November 1928, Fraternitas Lataviensis was formally accepted as a member of the Latvian student fraternity umbrella organization the Presidium Convent (PC). Fraternitas Lataviensis was actively participating in PC until it was suspended by the Soviet occupation on 13 July 1940. Also, in 1929, the Fraternitas Lataviensis Philister Aid Society joined the Latvian student fraternity Union of Philister Societies (UPS). After World War II, in 1948 or 1949 Fraternitas Lataviensis participated in the Latvian Fraternity Association, which was taking over the PC and UPS responsibilities during the exile. In 1989 and 1990, Fraternitas Lataviensis took part in the restoration of the Presidium Convent, and in 2005 Fraternitas Lataviensis Philister Aid Society participated in the restoration of the Latvian student fraternity Union of Philister Societies. The student fraternity's Fraternitas Lataviensis constitution (“komāns”) has been endorsed by the student fraternity Lettonia.

Since 19 March 2021, fraternity Fraternitas Lataviensis signed a special cartel agreement with the Estonian Students' Society (EÜS) attesting special friendship. Special friendships over years have also formed with the Lithuanian student fraternity Neo-Lithuania and the Baltic-German student fraternity Concordia Rigensis in Hamburg (Germany).

== Notable members ==
Fraternitas Lataviensis accepts students from the University of Latvia or Latvian students from other post-secondary institutions, so long as they do not belong to groups that endanger the sovereignty of Latvia, oppress religious freedoms, or are a member of another lifelong student organization. Fraternitas Lataviensis organizes visiting evenings, in which, students have an opportunity to attend the Corporation event as a visitor. Once students have visited the Convent chambers and expressed their interest in joining the Corporation, the Convent of Fraternitas Lataviensis decides whether or not to accept the new members. The levels of Corporation positions are: philisters, "komiltons", boys (or "fukši"). Within their own group, members of Fraternitas Lataviensis refer to each other as "latavienši."

There were 28 founding members of Fraternitas Lataviensis. By 1929, three years after its founding, Fraternitas Lataviensis had 73 members. In 1965 the organization had approximately 170 active members and in 1990, around 200 active members. In spring 2020, Fraternitas Lataviensis had 248 active members, of which 127 were living in Latvia. As of Spring 2020, there have been just over 900 total members, including active, deceased, or former members.

Within Fraternitas Lataviensis, there have been several significant national and public figures including politicians, diplomats, leaders, and jurors. The President of Latvia, Egils Levits, is a member of Fraternitas Lataviensis. Members who have contributed significantly to the fraternity’s growth include: Roberts Bērziņš, Tālivaldis Bērziņš, Mārtiņš Gode, Alfons Kalns, Alberts Kaļinka, Ādolfs Kraulis, Augusts Meldrājs, Jānis Ozols, Ādolfs Silde, Elmārs Tauriņš, and Eriks Vonda.

== See also ==
- List of student corporations in Latvia
