= Fraternitas Baltica =

Latvian student fraternity

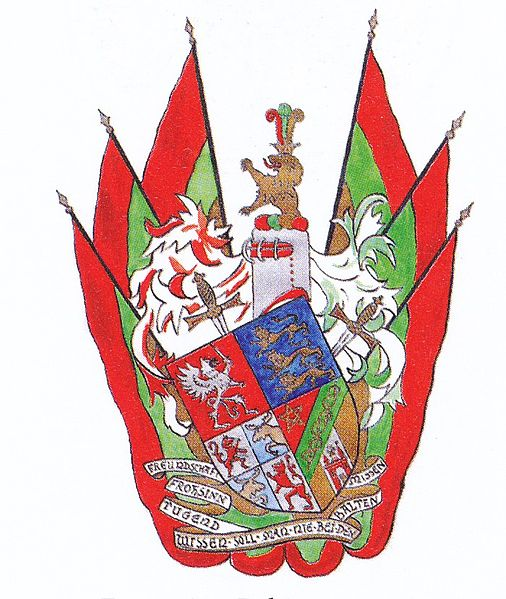
- Founded: 1865; 160 years ago Riga Polytechnic Institute
- Type: Studentenverbindung
- Affiliation: P!K!
- Status: Defunct
- Defunct date: 1938
- Successor: Curonia Goettingensis
- Emphasis: Baltic-German military
- Scope: International
- Motto: In Treuen fest "Strong in confidence)" Freundschaft, Frohsinn, Tugend, Wissen - soll man nie bei den Balten missed "Friendship, Happiness, Virtue and Knowledge, these are the things that none of Balts should miss"
- Colors: Red, Green, and Gold
- Chapters: 4
- Headquarters: 7 Marijas Street; Riga; Latvia

Fraternitas Baltica was a Baltic-German fraternity founded at Rīga Polytechnic Institute in Riga, Latvia in 1865. It was established as a collegiate fraternity but decided its members had to belong to Baltic-German military units after World War I. It was a member of Fraternity Presidium Convent (P!K!).

== History ==
Fraternitas Baltica was founded by students at Rīga Polytechnic Institute (RPI) in Riga, Latvia as Fraternitas Polytechnici Baltici. In 1867, Fraternitas Baltica founded the General Polytechnic Convention (APC), which led the social life in Polytechnic Institute.

In 1869 after disagreements, many students left the fraternity and founded Concordia Rigensis, which is still active today. During World War I, RPI evacuated to Moscow, and the fraternity suspended activity. In 1918, Fraternitas Baltica restored operations as a part of Baltic Technical College. Later that year, a decision was made that all of the active members had to belong to a Baltic-German military units.

In 1920, Fraternitas Baltica was registered as a fraternity of University of Latvia and was admitted to Fraternity Presidium Convent (P!K!). The fraternity left P!K! in 1932 in protest of the decision to use only Latvian language in their meetings. After leaving P!K!, Fraternitas Baltica ceased being a collegiate fraternity but continued to operate as a society that still used the name fraternity.

In 1938, Fraternitas Baltica ceased operations in Latvia and closed completely in 1939 with all the forced removal of its members to Germany. In 1959, Fraternitas Baltica members and other Baltic-German non-student fraternities founded Curonia Goettingensis, which is a continuation of Baltic fraternity traditions.

== Symbols ==
The colors of Fraternitas Baltica were red, green, and gold. Its mottos were "In Treuen fest" or "Strong in confidence" and "Freundschaft, Frohsinn, Tugend, Wissen soll man nie bei den Balten missen" which translates as "Friendship, Happiness, Virtue, and Knowledge are the things that none of Balts should miss"

== Chapters ==
Chapter	Charter date and range	Location	Status
Rīga Polytechnic Institute	1865–1914	Riga, Latvia	Inactive
Baltic Technical College	1918–19xx ?		Inactive
University of Latvia	1920–1932	Riga, Latvia	Inactive
Riga, Latvia	1932–	Riga, Latvia	Inactive

== See also ==
- List of student corporations in Latvia
