= Fraternitas Vanenica =

Latvian student corporation based in Munich, Germany

- Founded: June 20, 1947; 78 years ago Munich, Germany
- Type: Social
- Affiliation: Independent
- Status: Active
- Emphasis: Latvia
- Scope: International
- Motto: Veritati, Humanitati, Virtuti "For fatherland, duty, and friendship"
- Colors: Green, Red, and Silver
- Chapters: 1
- Headquarters: Artilērijas iela 54; Rīga LV-1009; Latvia
- Website: www.vanenica.lv (In Latvian)

Fraternitas Vanenica is Latvian all-male student fraternity (corporation) which was founded in Munich, Germany on June 20, 1947. It is the youngest Latvian student fraternity.

== History ==
=== Early years ===
Fraternitas Vanenica was founded by eighteen Latvian students (mostly from Latvian University) who arrived in Germany as refugees after World War II. Fleeing from the second Soviet occupation, more than 150,000 Latvians emigrated from Latvia in the years 1941 to 1945. Most of them spent some time in Germany. Thus, many young people wanted to restore their studies in German universities.

Fraternitas Vanenica was partly established as a Latvian student society in Munchen. It admitted Latvian students from Munich universities. It was very active in the period. Despite financial problems and poverty in post-war Germany, Fraternitas Vanenica was able to admit new members and educate them in the spirit of pre-war Latvian student fraternities.

=== International expansion ===
In 1950, most Latvian refugees started moving to the United States, Canada, and other Western countries. As members of Fraternitas Vanenica moved to the US, it began to operate there and established headquarters in New York City and on June 21, 1950. Many members later moved to Venezuela and established an autonomous group of the fraternity. In those years, the fraternity admitted Latvian students from American and Venezuelan universities and colleges.

Almost all Latvian student fraternities that renewed their work in exile, experienced a lack of funds and the challenges of assimilation but remained a symbol of the once independent Latvia. The fraternities helped maintain Latvian language and culture in exile and also retained more than 100-year-old traditions of Latvian student fraternities.

=== Fraternitas Vanenica today ===
In 1991, with the collapse of Soviet Union, Latvia regained its independence. Many Latvian student fraternities reformed in Latvia as early as 1989. Fraternitas Vanenica returned to Latvia from exile in 1992 and was rechartered on September 24, 1992. Soon its global center (presidium) was moved to Riga. It is registered with the University of Latvia, but members are admitted from all Latvian universities.

In 2002, Fraternitas Vanenica purchased a house in Riga at Artilērijas Street 54.

Fraternitas Vanenica symbols

== Symbols ==
Fraternitas Vanenica's name, translated from Latin, means "Brotherhood of Vanema". Vanema was an ancient land in Latvia (Kurzeme) in the late Iron Age. Its motto is Veritati, Humanitati, Virtuti in Latin or Tēvijai, Pienākumam, Draudzībaiin Latvian, which is "For fatherland, duty, and friendship. Its colors are green, red, and silver.

== Notable members ==
- Ernesto Foldats, botanist

== See also ==
- List of student corporations in Latvia
