= Mārsnēni Parish =

Parish of Latvia

- parish of Latvia
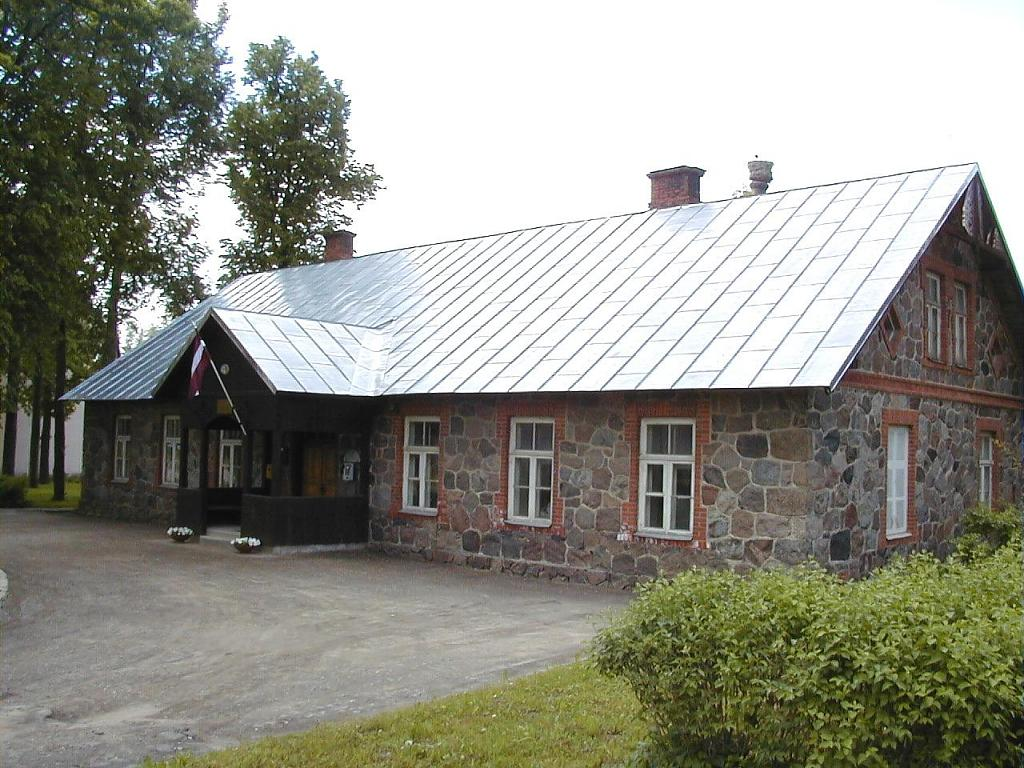

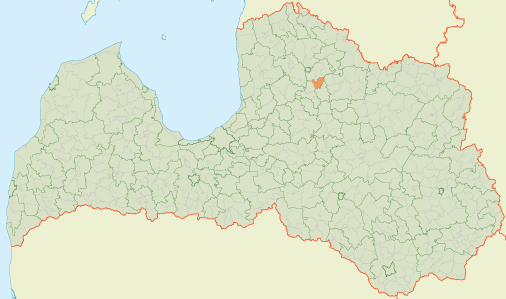
- Coordinates: 57°25′27″N 25°34′26″E
- Country: Latvia

Population (1 January 2026)
  - Total: 758

Mārsnēni Parish (Latvian: Mārsnēnu pagasts) is an administrative unit of Cēsis Municipality in the Vidzeme region of Latvia.

== Towns, villages and settlements of Mārsnēni Parish ==
- Mārsnēni - parish administrative center.
