= Priekuļi Parish =

Parish in Cēsis Municipality, Latvia

- parish of Latvia
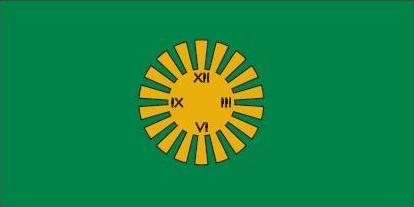
- Flag

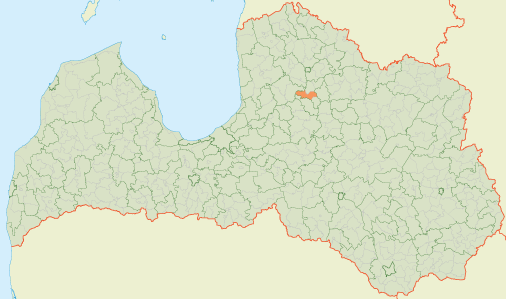
- Coordinates: 57°19′54″N 25°23′36″E
- Country: Latvia

Population (1 January 2026)
  - Total: 3,732
- Time zone: UTC+02:00

Priekuļi Parish (Latvian: Priekuļu pagasts) is an administrative unit of Cēsis Municipality in the Vidzeme region of Latvia. The administrative center of the parish is the village of Priekuļi.

== Villages and settlements of Priekuļi Parish ==
- Priekuļi
- Jāņmuiža
- Dukuri
- Jaunrauna
- Annasmuiža
- Garkalne
- Inkuļi
- Kunči
- Lubiņas
- Mežciemi
- Pēterēni
- Pieškalni
- Rauguļi
- Šautuves
- Vaives dzirnavas ('Vaive Mill')
- Vīstuči
