= Priekuļi =

Village and center of Priekuļi Parish of Cēsis Municipality, Latvia

- Village
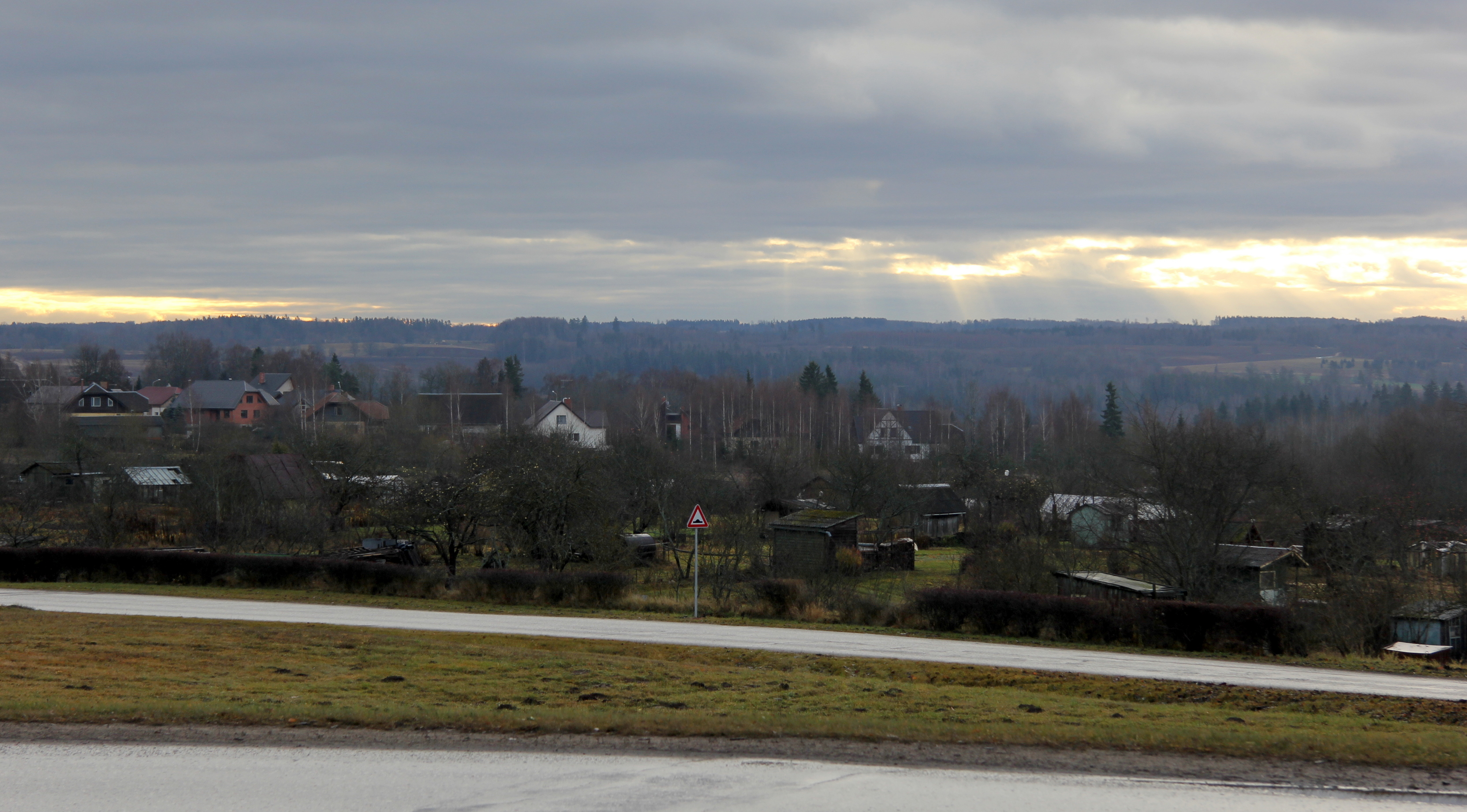
- Priekuļi in late autumn

- Location of Priekuļi within Latvia
- Coordinates: 57°18′51″N 25°21′35″E
- Country: Latvia
- Municipality: Cēsis
- Parish: Priekuļi

Population (2022)
  - Total: 2,136
- Postal code: LV-4126

Priekuļi (German: Freudenberg) is a village and the center of Priekuļi Parish, Cēsis Municipality in the Vidzeme region of Latvia. It is situated 7 kilometres east of Cēsis and had 2,136 residents as of 2022.

== Climate ==
Priekuļi has a humid continental climate (Köppen Dfb).

Climate data for Priekuļi (1991-2020 normals, extremes 1912–present)
Month	Jan	Feb	Mar	Apr	May	Jun	Jul	Aug	Sep	Oct	Nov	Dec	Year
Record high °C (°F)	9.7 (49.5)	10.9 (51.6)	17.4 (63.3)	27.2 (81.0)	30.3 (86.5)	32.0 (89.6)	34.0 (93.2)	32.7 (90.9)	29.5 (85.1)	21.5 (70.7)	14.3 (57.7)	11.0 (51.8)	34.0 (93.2)
Mean daily maximum °C (°F)	−1.6 (29.1)	−1.3 (29.7)	3.3 (37.9)	10.8 (51.4)	16.9 (62.4)	20.2 (68.4)	22.8 (73.0)	21.7 (71.1)	16.2 (61.2)	9.2 (48.6)	3.3 (37.9)	−0.1 (31.8)	10.1 (50.2)
Daily mean °C (°F)	−3.7 (25.3)	−3.8 (25.2)	−0.1 (31.8)	6.2 (43.2)	11.7 (53.1)	15.3 (59.5)	17.7 (63.9)	16.7 (62.1)	11.9 (53.4)	6.2 (43.2)	1.5 (34.7)	−1.8 (28.8)	6.5 (43.7)
Mean daily minimum °C (°F)	−6.3 (20.7)	−6.8 (19.8)	−3.5 (25.7)	1.7 (35.1)	6.2 (43.2)	10.2 (50.4)	12.8 (55.0)	12.2 (54.0)	8.2 (46.8)	3.4 (38.1)	−0.7 (30.7)	−4.1 (24.6)	2.8 (37.0)
Record low °C (°F)	−36.5 (−33.7)	−38.0 (−36.4)	−26.4 (−15.5)	−12.6 (9.3)	−5.4 (22.3)	−1.4 (29.5)	3.5 (38.3)	−0.1 (31.8)	−4.5 (23.9)	−12.9 (8.8)	−20.6 (−5.1)	−39.0 (−38.2)	−39.0 (−38.2)
Average precipitation mm (inches)	51.2 (2.02)	40.4 (1.59)	37.4 (1.47)	42.2 (1.66)	57.6 (2.27)	84.0 (3.31)	85.2 (3.35)	84.6 (3.33)	58.1 (2.29)	77.2 (3.04)	57.7 (2.27)	50.7 (2.00)	726.3 (28.6)
Average precipitation days (≥ 1 mm)	12	10	8	9	9	10	11	11	10	12	11	12	125
Average relative humidity (%)	88.6	86.2	77.9	69.3	66.4	71.6	74.6	76.4	81.2	86.0	89.7	89.7	79.8
Source 1: LVĢMC
Source 2: NOAA (precipitation days, humidity 1991-2020)
