= Midnight blue =

Dark shade of blue

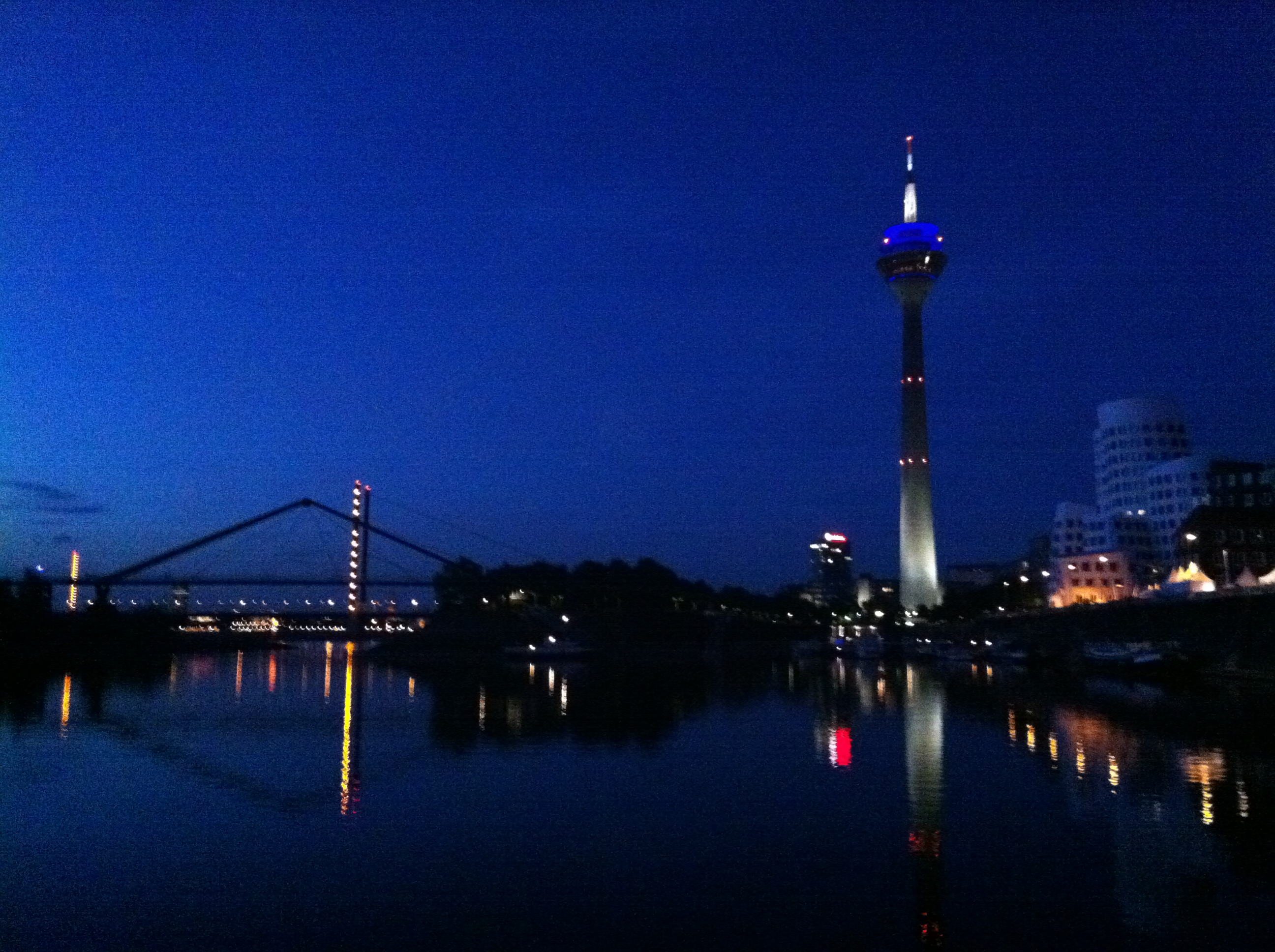
Midnight sky in Düsseldorf, Germany

Midnight blue is a dark shade of blue named for its resemblance to the apparently blue color of a moonlit night sky around a full moon. Midnight blue is identifiably blue to the eye in sunlight or full-spectrum light, but can appear black under certain more limited spectra sometimes found in artificial lighting (especially early 20th-century incandescent). It is similar to navy, which is also a dark blue.

== Variations ==
British Standard BS 2660, which specified colours for use in building and decorating, assigned the code BS2660-7086 for midnight blue. BS 4800, which largely superseded this, defined a colour called 'midnight' with the code 20-C-40. The defunct British Colour Council assigned the code BCC 90.

=== X11 ===
Midnight Blue

Color coordinates
- Hex triplet: #191970
- sRGB^{B} (r, g, b): (25, 25, 112)
- HSV (h, s, v): (240°, 78%, 44%)
- CIELCh_{uv} (L, C, h): (16, 49, 266°)
- Source: X11
- ISCC–NBS descriptor: Vivid blue
- B: Normalized to [0–255] (byte)

This color was originally called midnight. The first recorded use of midnight as a color name in English was in 1915.

At right is displayed the color midnight blue. This is the X11 web color midnight blue.

=== Dark midnight blue (Crayola) ===
Midnight Blue (Crayola)

Color coordinates
- Hex triplet: #003366
- sRGB^{B} (r, g, b): (0, 51, 102)
- HSV (h, s, v): (210°, 100%, 40%)
- CIELCh_{uv} (L, C, h): (21, 42, 253°)
- Source: Crayola
- ISCC–NBS descriptor: Deep blue
- B: Normalized to [0–255] (byte)

At right is displayed the dark shade of midnight blue that is called midnight blue in Crayola crayons. Midnight blue became an official crayola color in 1958; before that, since having been formulated by Crayola in 1903, it was called Prussian blue.

== In culture ==
=== Fashion ===
- Midnight blue is an alternative to black as a color for dinner jackets. Due to the deepness of the color, midnight blue formal clothes are often almost indistinguishable from black. The Duke of Windsor popularized the color in suits and tuxedos.

=== Music ===
- In 1963, American jazz guitarist Kenny Burrell released the album Midnight Blue.
- In 1975, Melissa Manchester released "Midnight Blue".
- In 1987, rock vocalist Lou Gramm released a single entitled "Midnight Blue".
- In 2022, Taylor Swift began wearing midnight blue outfits as part of the promotion for her Midnights album. A year later, she sported wearing similarly colored costumes the last act of her Eras Tour.

== See also ==
- List of colors
