= Vecpiebalga Municipality =

Municipality in Latvia

Coordinates: 57°03′43″N 25°48′39″E

Vecpiebalga Municipality Vecpiebalga novads
- Former municipality
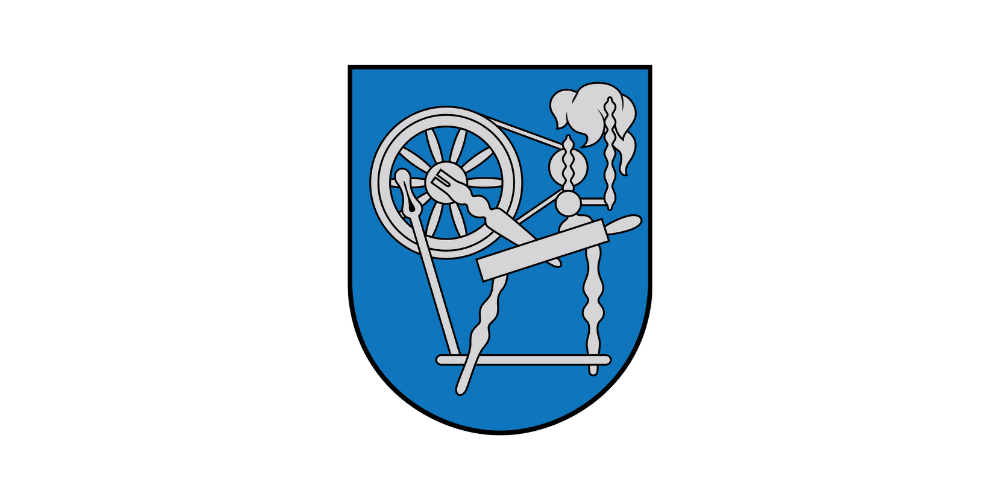
- Flag Coat of arms

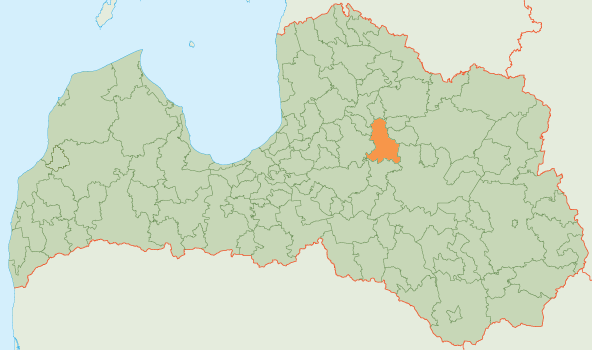
- Country: Latvia
- Formed: 2009
- Centre: Vecpiebalga

Government
  - Council Chair: Indriķis Putniņš (LZS)

Area
  - Total: 542.18 km^{2} (209.34 sq mi)
  - Land: 515.01 km^{2} (198.85 sq mi)
  - Water: 27.17 km^{2} (10.49 sq mi)

Population (2021)
  - Total: 3,614
  - Density: 7.017/km^{2} (18.17/sq mi)
- Website: www.vecpiebalga.lv

Vecpiebalga Municipality (Latvian: Vecpiebalgas novads) is a former municipality in Vidzeme, Latvia. It ceased to exist on 1 July 2021, as its territory was merged into Cēsis Municipality as Vecpiebalga Parish. The municipality was formed in 2009 by merging Dzērbene Parish, Ineši Parish, Kaive Parish, Taurene Parish and Vecpiebalga Parish; the administrative centre being Vecpiebalga. The population in 2020 was 3,555.

== Population ==
Parish	Population (year)
Dzērbene parish	825 (2018)
Ineši Parish	623 (2018)
Kaive Parish	320 (2018)
Taurene Parish	825 (2018)
Vecpiebalga Parish	1345 (2018)

== See also ==
- Administrative divisions of Latvia (2009)
