= Pārgauja Municipality =

Municipality of Latvia

Coordinates: 57°22′15″N 25°01′51″E

Pārgauja Municipality Pārgaujas novads
- Former municipality
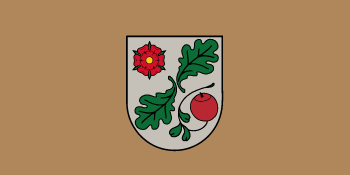
- Flag Coat of arms

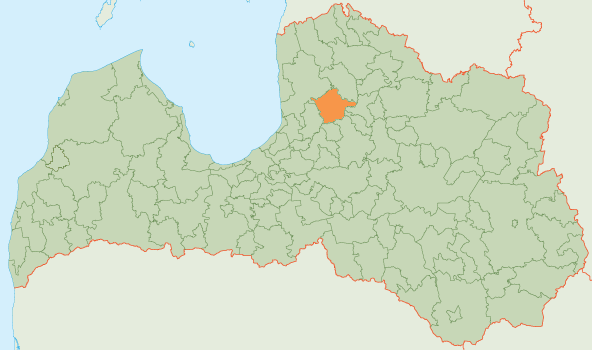
- Country: Latvia
- Formed: 2009
- Centre: Stalbe

Government
  - Council Chair: Hardijs Vents (United For the Municipality/ZZS)

Area
  - Total: 486.55 km^{2} (187.86 sq mi)
  - Land: 467.86 km^{2} (180.64 sq mi)
  - Water: 18.69 km^{2} (7.22 sq mi)

Population (2021)
  - Total: 3,603
  - Density: 7.701/km^{2} (19.95/sq mi)
- Website: www.pargaujasnovads.lv

Pārgauja Municipality (Latvian: Pārgaujas novads) is a former municipality in Vidzeme, Latvia. The municipality was formed in 2009 by merging Raiskums Parish, Stalbe Parish and Straupe Parish, the administrative centre being Stalbe. As of 2020, the population was 3,576.

On 1 July 2021, Pārgauja Municipality ceased to exist and its territory was merged into Cēsis Municipality.

== Twin towns — sister cities ==
Pārgauja is twinned with:

- Motta Santa Lucia, Italy
- Oarja, Romania
- Rîșcani, Moldova
- Spydeberg, Norway

== See also ==
- Administrative divisions of Latvia
