= Amata Municipality =

Former municipality of Latvia

Coordinates: 57°12′N 25°09′E

Amata Municipality Amatas novads
- Former municipality
- Coat of arms

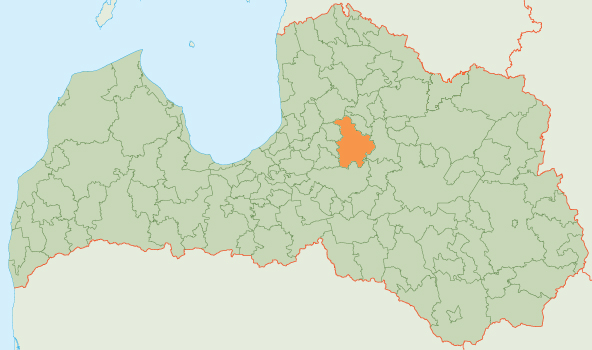
- Country: Latvia
- Formed: 2000
- Dissolved: 2021
- Centre: Drabeši

Government
  - Council Chair (last): Elita Eglīte (LZS)

Area
  - Total: 745.94 km^{2} (288.01 sq mi)
  - Land: 731.07 km^{2} (282.27 sq mi)
  - Water: 14.87 km^{2} (5.74 sq mi)

Population (2021)
  - Total: 5,042
  - Density: 6.897/km^{2} (17.86/sq mi)
- Website: www.amatasnovads.lv

Amata Municipality (Latvian: Amatas novads) was a municipality in Vidzeme, Latvia. The municipality was formed in 2000 by merging Amata Parish and Drabeši Parish, but in 2009 it absorbed Nītaure parish, Skujene parish and Zaube parish, too. The administrative centre was located in the "Ausmas" homestead near Drabeši.

On 1 July 2021, Amata Municipality ceased to exist and its territory was merged into Cēsis Municipality, reverting back to the pre-2009 parishes.

== Twin towns — sister cities ==
Amata was twinned with:

- Alytus, Lithuania

== See also ==
- Administrative divisions of Latvia
