= Lielstraupe Castle =

Castle in Latvia

- Straupe, Vidzeme, Latvia
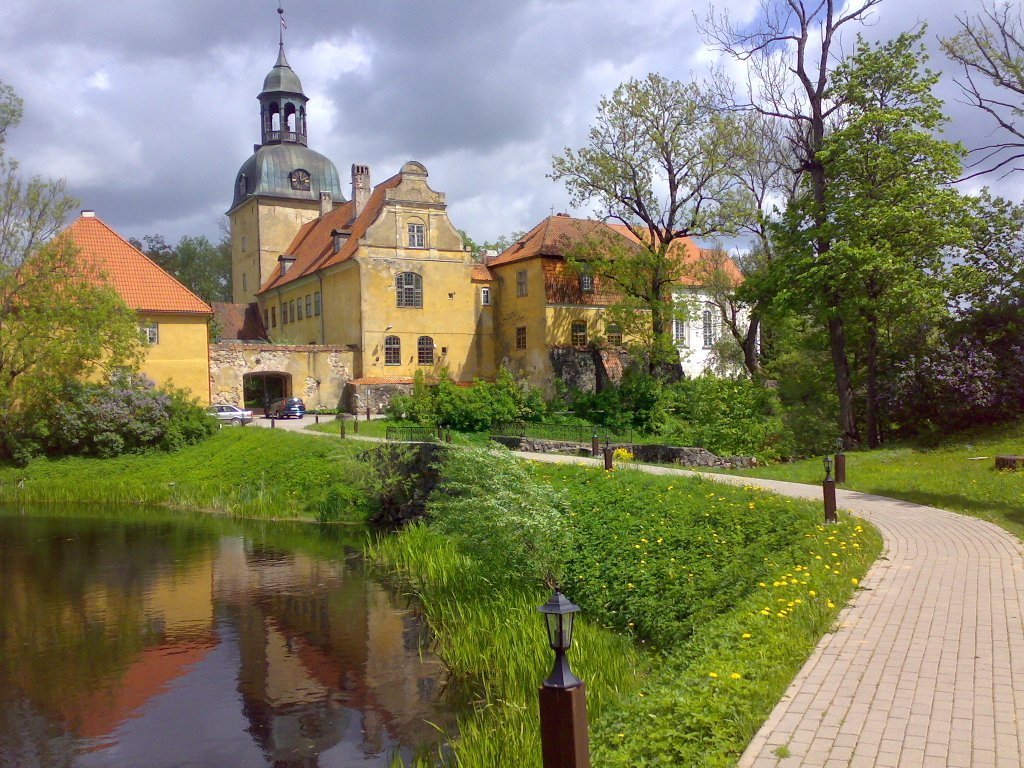

Site information
- Type: Castle

Location
- Coordinates: 57.3468°N 24.947983°E

Site history
- Built: 13th century, rebuilt early 20th century
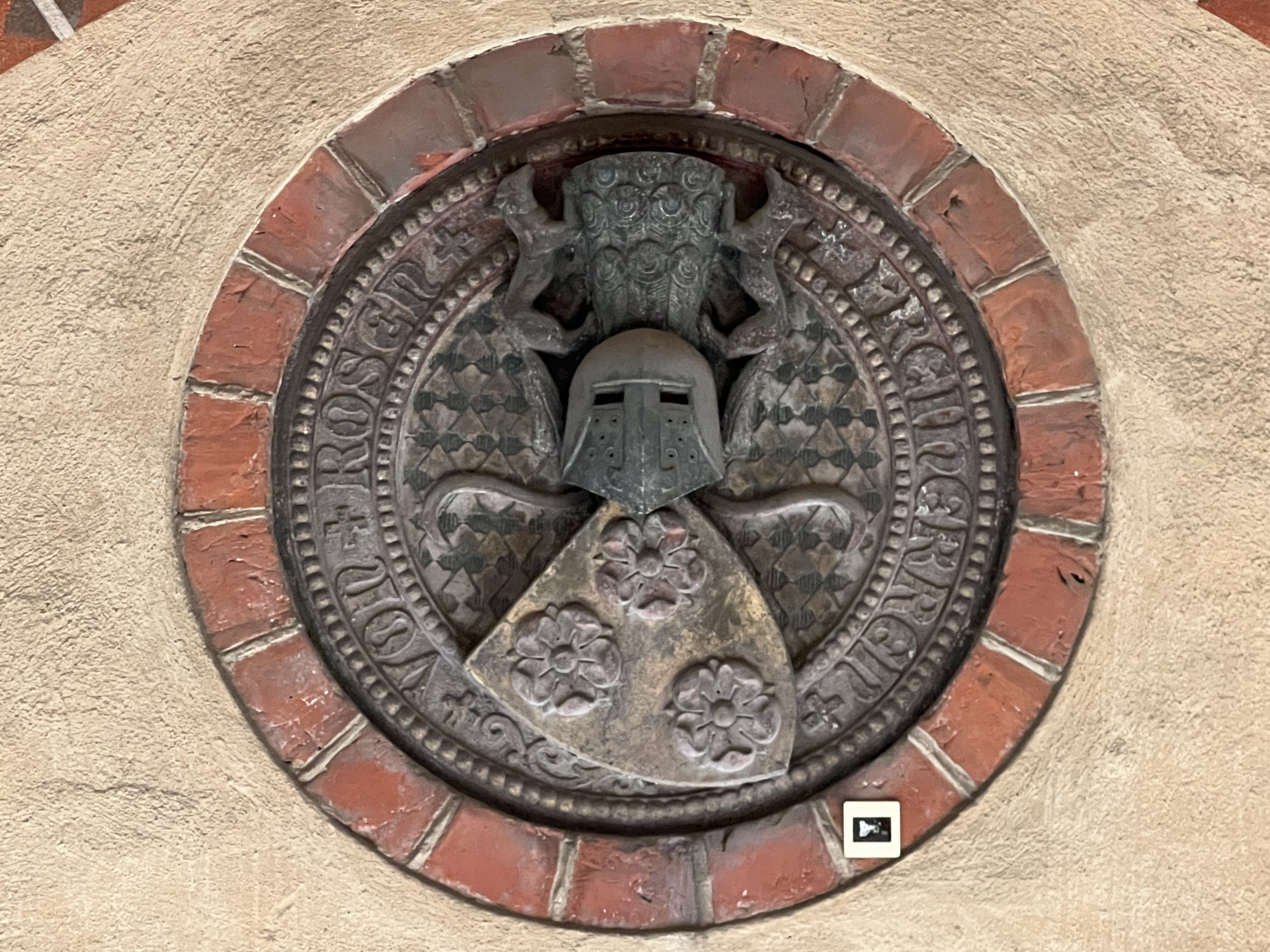
- Built by: Livonian Brothers of the Sword Coat of Arms of Family von Rosen in Riga Cathedral

Lielstraupe Castle (Latvian: Lielstraupes pils; German: Schloss Gross-Roop) is a castle in Straupe Parish, Cēsis Municipality, in the Vidzeme region of Latvia. It was originally built by the von Rosen family in the 13th century and the village of Straupe began to develop around the castle in the 14th century, a large tower was added around 1600 and expropriated soon after. Latter reacquired and remodeled into the baroque style in the 18th century and remained inhabited until being expropriated from Hans von Rosen in 1939.

== History ==
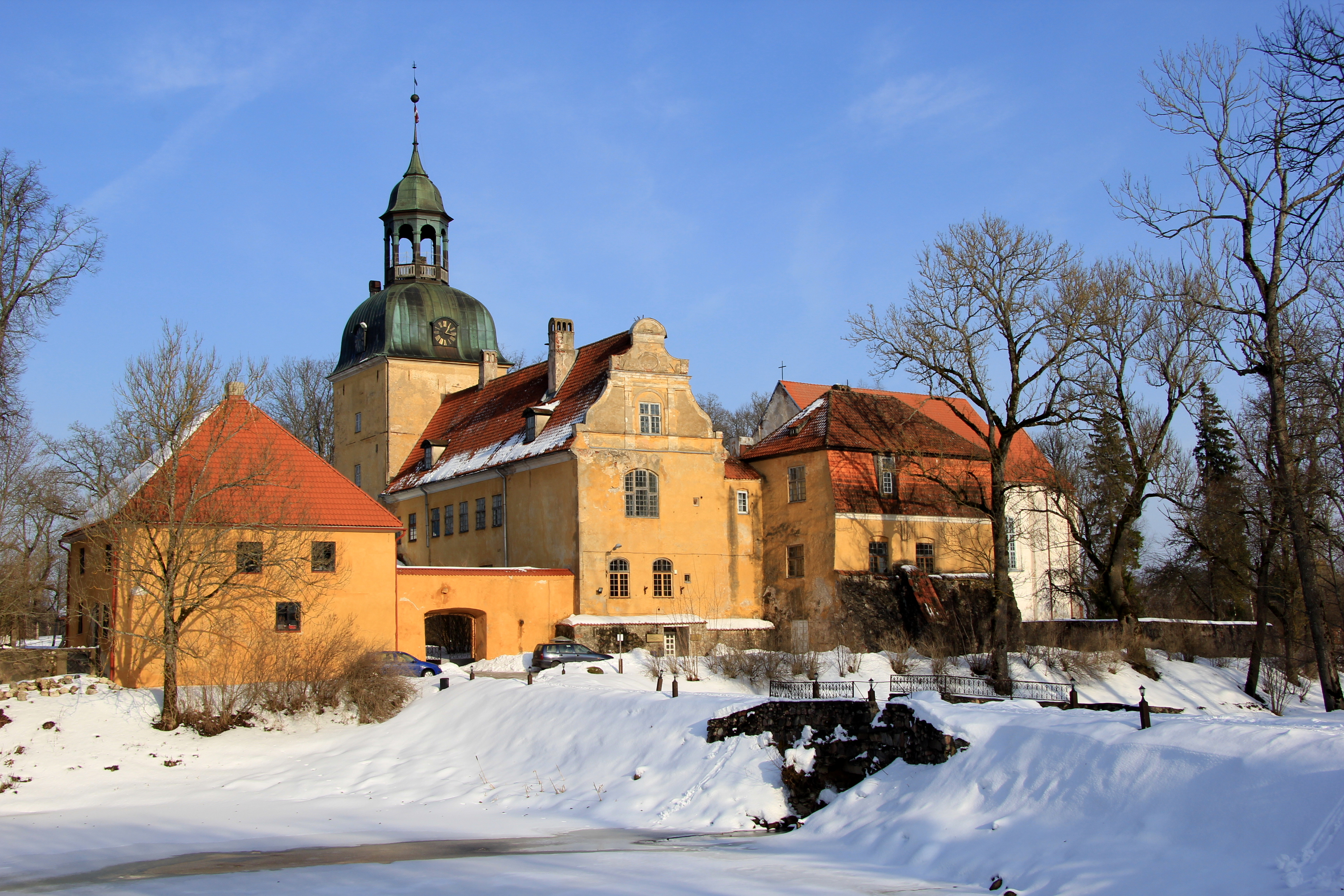
Lielstraupe Castle panoramic view.

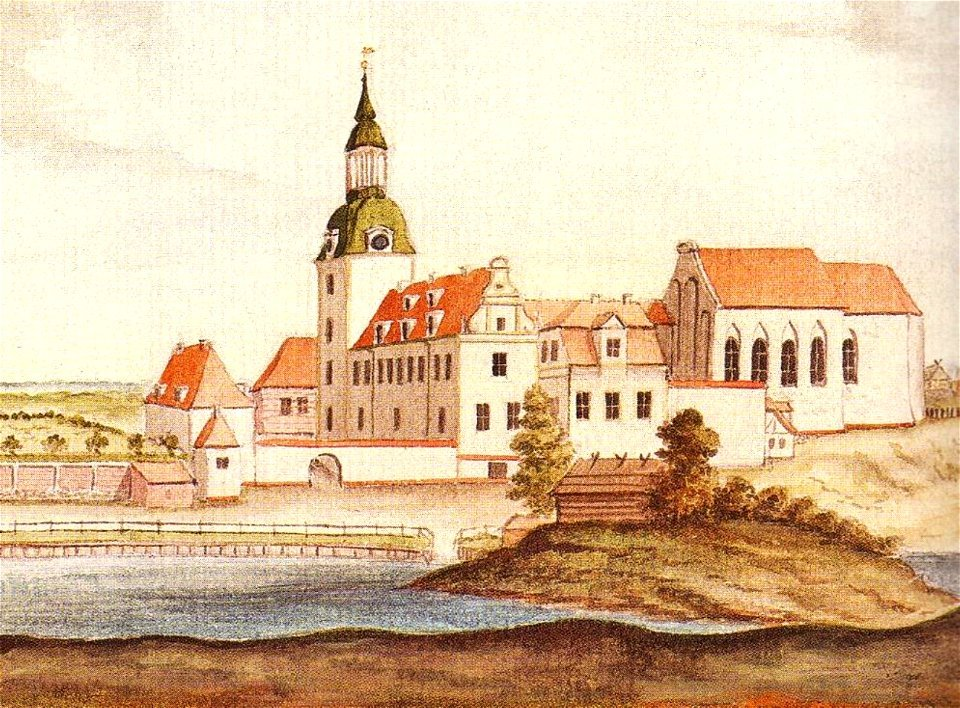
Ancestral home of von Rosen family in 1778

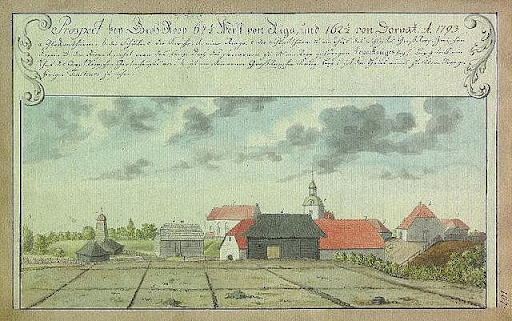
The Ancient Town of Straupe

Beginning in the Late Middle Ages, the land around Straupe belonged to the Diocese of Riga from the beginning of the 13th century, and at the end of that century it was an archiepiscopal fief in the possession of the canon's bailiff Otto von Rosen. His family was an old Livonian noble family and was one of the most influential vassals of the Archbishop of Riga. It is possible that there was already a castle on that site in the second half of the 13th century, because at that time the settlement of Roop already existed as a Hakelwerk, that is, a small town surrounded by a palisade. In addition, a Waldemar von Rosen is documented for the year 1288, although no fief of his was mentioned when he was mentioned. According to tradition, the complex was founded in 1263, but there is no documentary evidence for this date. The first written mention of a castle belonging to the Rosen family in what was then Roop dates back to 1310, when it was besieged by Lithuanians. In 1350, Archbishop Fromhold von Vifhusen lent the "husz tho Rosen" to the knight Wolmar von Rosen and his nephew Hennecke. A generation after Hennecke, the Rosen lands were divided into three independent properties, which were named after their noble seats: Groß-Roop, Klein-Roop and Hochrosen. At that time, the Groß-Roop complex probably consisted only of a fortified quadrangular tomb and a castle courtyard to the north, which bordered the town of Roop. It was therefore one of the tower castles.

== Damage and confiscation ==
Presumably around 1500, Groß-Roop was expanded to include a residential wing that adjoined the castle tower to the southwest. At the same time, a Gothic church was built to the east, which was integrated into the defensive system of the complex by being connected to the tower and the new residential wing by a ring wall. While the complex was referred to in documents up to the time of the expansion as "hoff to Rope", from 1512 onwards it appeared in written records as "dat sloth rope".

In 1529, the complex was purchased by a family line of the House of Hochrosen. At the beginning of the 17th century, it was badly damaged during the Northern Wars. In 1624, it was mentioned that it had no roof and was unused with the exception of two rooms, a cellar and a kitchen. Since the owners were on the side of the Poles in the Polish-Swedish War and thus the losers, King Gustav Adolf confiscated the restored Gross-Roop Castle in 1625 after his troops had gained the upper hand in the Riga area, and gave the complex as a fief to Lieutenant Colonel Wilhelm von Wallenstein. He sold it in 1629 for 3,100 speciestaler to the widow of Jürgen von Albedyll, Elisabeth née von Ihlenbach. The von Albedyll family was followed by the von Stackelberg family as lords of the castle in 1704. They acquired a complex that had already been restored for the second time, as a fire in 1684 had severely damaged the castle and church.

== Baroque remodeling in the 18th century ==
The Great Northern War saw further destruction. Shortly after the end of the war, Count Peter von Lacy acquired the damaged complex and had it rebuilt and remodeled by 1743. This was accompanied by a Baroque remodeling of the castle. The old castle tower was given a curved hood, the residential wing on the southern front side was given a tail gable and a new portal on the courtyard side. The new lord of the castle also had the badly damaged church remodeled to its current form. He was succeeded by the Elector of Saxony's chamberlain Peter von Vietinghoff as owner. In 1780 he sold Groß-Roop to Peter von Lacy's nephew, the Governor General of Livonia Georg Graf Browne, who in turn was succeeded by the Counts of Solms and Tecklenburg as lords of the castle. In 1797, Heinrich Friedrich von Solms and Tecklenburg mortgaged the property to his secretary Jakob Bernhard Müller, who ceded it to the Russian Emperor Paul I in the same year.

In 1857, after many years of effort, Baron Johann Gustav von Rosen, who lived at Klein-Roop Castle, succeeded in buying back Groß-Roop for his family, and in 1866 he made it a family fideicommissum. At that time, the property comprised around 800 hectares of land, mostly consisting of forest.

== Further destruction and further reconstruction in the 20th century. ==
During the 1905 Russian Revolution, the castle was badly damaged by a fire set by revolutionaries in December 1905. The then owner, Baron Hans von Rosen, had it rebuilt and restored between 1906 and 1909 according to plans by the Riga-born architect Wilhelm Bockslaff. The destroyed parts were reconstructed as far as possible, such as the stucco ceilings in the interior rooms or the large baroque staircase made of oak. The work is considered to be the first restoration in Latvia to be carried out according to scientific standards. However, some previously non-existent parts were also added, including the second floor of the northeast wing and some half-timbered buildings.

In 1920, Hans von Rosen - like all large landowners in Latvia - was expropriated as part of a major agrarian reform. Of his vast property, he was only left with about 50 hectares,including the Gross-Roop Castle. He lived there until his resettlement in 1939.

== Since 1945 ==
After the end of the Second World War, the castle complex initially housed a tractor workshop. From 1963 onwards, it housed a state clinic. Although renovation work was carried out again between 1966 and 1970, the clinic had to cease operations at the end of 2017 due to the buildings' dilapidation. Since then, local politicians have been looking for a new use for the complex. The Pārgauja administrative district has meanwhile taken it on and opened it to visitors.

== Description ==
Gross-Roop Castle is located in the immediate vicinity of the A3 on the way from Riga to Valmiera (German Wolmar) on the left bank of the Brasla (German Raupa/Ropa), a tributary of the Livonian Aa. Less than a kilometer to the northeast is Klein-Roop Castle, which was built by the same family. The fortified predecessor of Gross-Roop was located on an elevated spot above the river and was protected from attacks by a bend in the Brasla and dammed ponds on two sides. On the other sides of the castle there was a rampart and artificial moats for defense. Of these defensive elements, only the ponds to the west and south of the castle remain today.

== Architecture ==
The castle is a two-winged complex, the wings of which meet at almost right angles, thus surrounding an inner courtyard on two sides. The two unbuilding sides in the southwest and southeast of the courtyard are closed off by the remains of a defensive wall that dates back to the time of the castle. The masonry of the buildings is mostly made of brick and is plastered in yellow and white. Where the two wings meet there is an almost square tower measuring 9 × 9.45 meters, with walls up to four meters thick. It most likely dates back to the first castle complex and would therefore be the oldest part of the current castle. Its four floors are topped by a baroque hood with an open lantern and a crowning weather vane. The latter shows the year 1743, the year in which the baroque reconstruction of the complex under Peter von Lacy was completed. On all four sides of the roof there is a clock face for the tower clock installed by a local master clockmaker.

The 27-metre long and originally nine-metre wide northwest wing was used for residential purposes. Its gable on the southern front bears a strong resemblance to the gable of the cathedral in Riga, which dates from 1727. During the reconstruction under Count von Lacy, the wing was widened to its current size. Its courtyard-facing portal with a blown-up gable and the vestibule behind it dates from the same period. The new building had become necessary because the baroque staircase had been destroyed in a fire in the 17th century. The inscription dating the portal to 1909 results from repair work carried out that year. The terrace in front of the portal, including the open staircase, dates from the same period. The north-west wing is adjoined to the south corner by a two-storey rectangular building with a tiled hipped roof, which was formerly called the Knights' Hall. A part of the old ring wall was integrated into its ground floor.

The north-east side of the castle courtyard is bordered by a two-storey wing that is 27.8 metres long. There is the large main gate to the inner courtyard, above which the coat of arms of the von Rosen family and an inscription can be found on the outside. This states 1263, the alleged year of the founding of the complex, but the inscription itself dates from the 19th century at the earliest.

Castle Church

The northeast wing is adjoined to the east by the 32.4-meter long castle church from the Gothic period. For a long time, the castle lords from the von Rosen family were buried in the church. This is evidenced by the preserved gravestone of Georg von Rosen, who died in 1590. Other gravestones - including more recent ones - are set up in the castle courtyard. The church with the high pointed arch windows was formerly three-aisled and had a vaulted interior, but was rebuilt in a modified form after being damaged by a fire. Today its nave has a single nave and the vault is only preserved in the choir. However, preserved wall pillars and remains of the shield arch still bear witness to the former nave vault. The interior includes a painted pulpit from 1739 and stained glass windows in the apse, which were made according to designs by the artist Sigismunds Vidbergs and installed there in 1940/1941.

== Castle Park ==
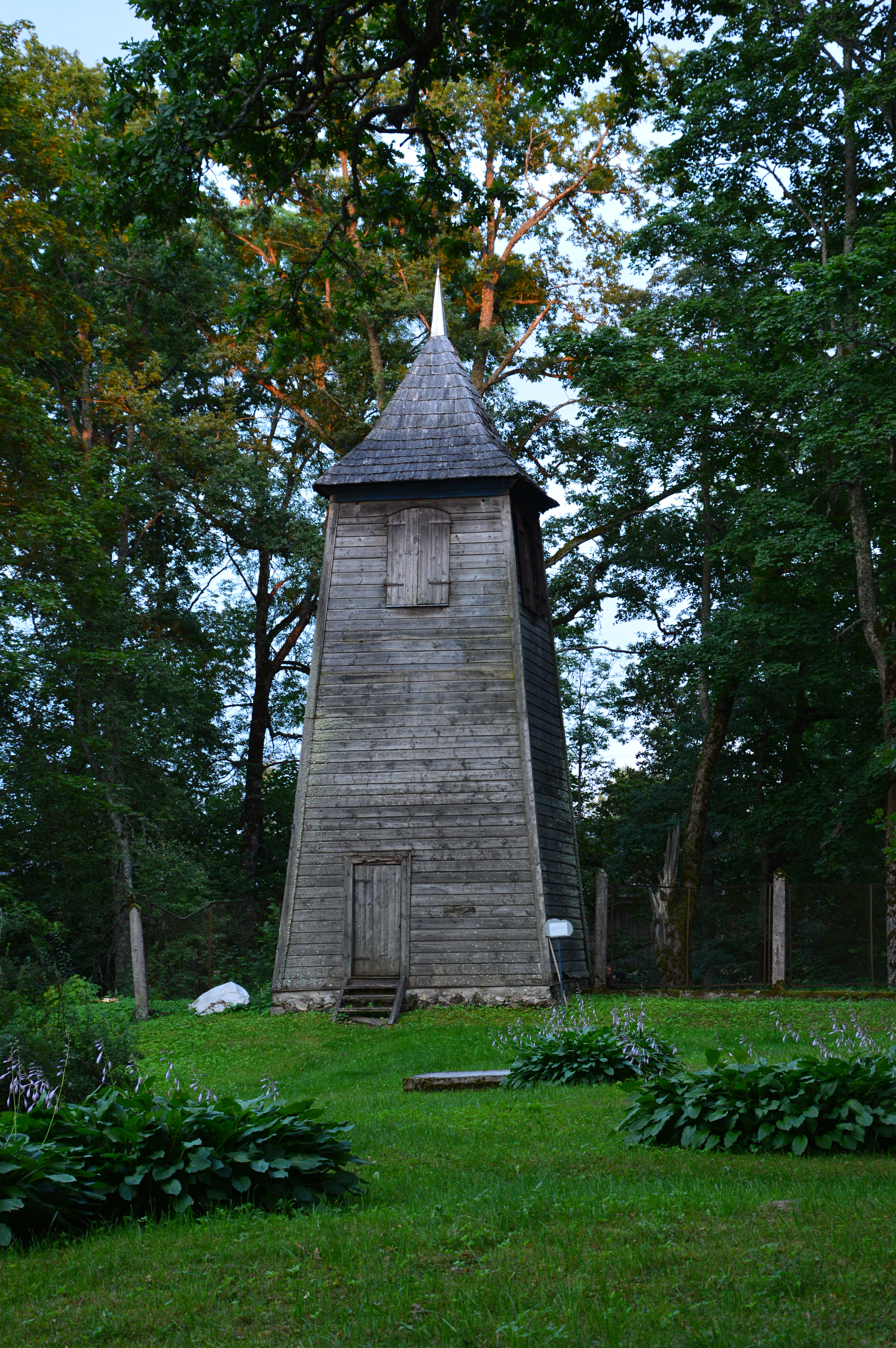
Wooden bell tower built in 1848.

The castle is surrounded by a park with a pond. Local and exotic trees such as Jasmine, Abies balsamea are growing in the park. In the farthest corner of the park, there is a peculiar separate wood bell tower that was built in 1848. The place where the park is now extending in the 14th century since 1374 there was the city of Straupe in accordance with the Riga Law and also being a member of Hanseatic League. However in 17th century city was destroyed and was never restored.

There is also a medieval cemetery in the park, which was the oldest cemetery in the town of Straupe. Victims of the plague epidemic of the 16th century has been buried in this cemetery. Plague devastated city of Straupe which lost 81.5% of the population and only 794 city inhabitants survived. The deceased buried the deceased until 1775, with the exception of the city barons and the city pastor who were buried in the church. Now the baron's gravestones can be seen in the church garden.

== See also ==
- List of castles in Latvia
- Turaida Castle
