= Karolīne Kronvalde =

Latvian teacher and feminist

Karolīne Lizete Kronvalde
- Born: 2 April 1836; Lielgramzda, Courland Governorate, Russian Empire (now Gramzda, South Kurzeme Municipality, Latvia)
- Died: 23 October 1913 (aged 77); Vecpiebalga, Courland Governorate, Russian Empire (now Cēsis Municipality, Latvia)
- Occupations: Feminist and teacher
- Spouse: Atis Kronvalds

Karolīne Lizete Kronvalde, née Roloff (2 April 1836 – 23 October 1913) was a Latvian teacher of Baltic-German descent and feminist. Her letter to the Baltic Herald (Latvian: Baltijas Vēstnesis) in 1870, defending women's rights to an education and freedom from paternalistic restrictions has been "regarded as the spark igniting women’s activism and movements in Latvia thereafter."

== Life ==
Kronvalde was born on 2 April 1836 in Lielgramzda, a manor village in Courland Governorate, Russian Empire (now Gramzda, Gramzda Parish, South Kurzeme Municipality, Latvia). Educational opportunities for girls were lacking during her childhood and she was largely self-educated; she received a teaching qualification from the Jelgava Gymnasium in 1855. Teaching in the town of Durbe in 1860, she met her future husband Atis Kronvalds who also was a teacher there. She followed him to the town of Tartu and then to Vecpiebalga in 1867 where they married the next year after he finally completed his studies. Kronvalde taught languages in Riga after his death in 1875 and managed the boarding school of the Riga Latvians’ Association. She moved back to Vecpiebalga in 1889 to live with her daughter Milda Sliede and remained there until her death on 23 October 1913.

== Activities ==
The first discussion on women's rights in Latvia occurred in 1870 in the pages of the Baltic Herald after it published an article entitled On Friday Evening (Latvian: Piektdienas vakarā) by someone named Garrs. In it he mocked women: "a man is and always will be smarter than a woman, and the thicker his beard, the stronger his mind". Kronvalde wrote a response calling for "women’s equal rights in the spheres of education, an end to restrictions on women’s personal freedom and for a general intellectual awakening among women and the nation as a whole. With regards to the superior wisdom of men, Kronvalde added: "You say "that is what we men believe in, and will continue to believe"—so be it, we shall not forbid it. And you, being superior in mind, let us hold to our beliefs".

== Citations and references ==
=== Cited sources ===
- Novikova, Irina (2005). "Kronvalde, Karolīne". In Haan, Francisca de; Daskalova, Krassimira; Loutfi, Anna (eds.). Biographical Dictionary of Women's Movements and Feminisms in Central, Eastern, and South Eastern Europe: 19th and 20th Centuries. New York: Central European University Press. ISBN 978-963-7326-39-4.
