= Dzērbene Manor =

Manor house in Latvia

Dzērbene manor
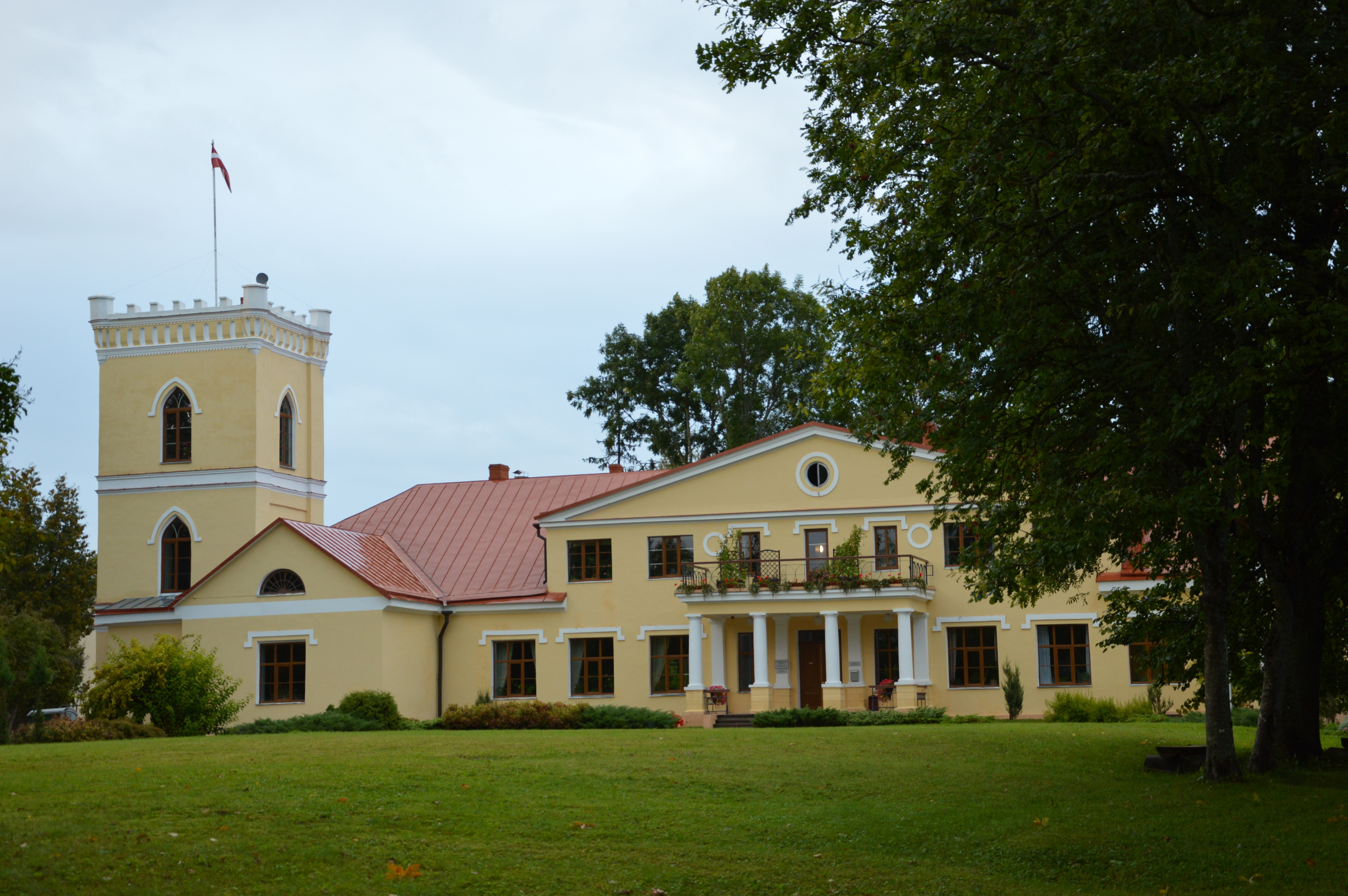
- Interactive map of the Dzērbene manor area

General information
- Architectural style: Classicism, Neo-Gothic
- Location: Cēsis Municipality, Latvia
- Coordinates: 57°11′45″N 25°39′58″E
- Completed: End of the 18th century.
- Client: von Weissenstein family

Dzērbene Manor (Latvian: Dzērbenes muižas pils; German: Schloß Serben) is a manor house in the Dzērbene Parish of Cēsis Municipality in the Vidzeme region of Latvia.

== History ==
Modern manor house is built on the place where old Dzērbene medieval castle once stood. Dzērbene manor is mentioned for the first time in 1555 when it was presented to chancellor of Archbishopric of Riga Christoph Sturz. In 1556 old castle was destroyed by army of Livonian Order and in 1577 also by Muscovites. During period of Swedish Livonia Dzērbene manor was owned by Svante Banner. After Great Northern War Dzērbene manor complex with more than 20 buildings became property of Russian Empire. In 1771 Russian empress Catherine II presented property to the major-general Otto Adolf Weismann von Weißenstein. His descendants owned the manor until 1891. From 1891 property was owned by von Lauwdohn family. Manor house was burned during Russian Revolution of 1905 but was rebuilt later. During the First World War the manor saw further damage and its last owners departed for Germany.

After the Latvian agrarian reform of 1920 manor building and lands was nationalized and divided into 144 new farms. Manor building was restored and in 1927 Technical school of agriculture was located there. After the Second World war and one more fire in 1947 building was reconstructed in 1949 and still was occupied by agricultural school. In the 1980s building became property of local sovkhoz Dzērbene. The building currently houses the Dzērbene parish administration offices, a community center, a music school, and a coffee shop.

Current manor building was built near the end of the 18th century in Classical style. A large Neo-Gothic tower was added near the end of the 19th century.

== See also ==
- List of palaces and manor houses in Latvia
