= Vecpiebalga Castle =

Castle in Latvia

- Vecpiebalga, Vidzeme, Latvia
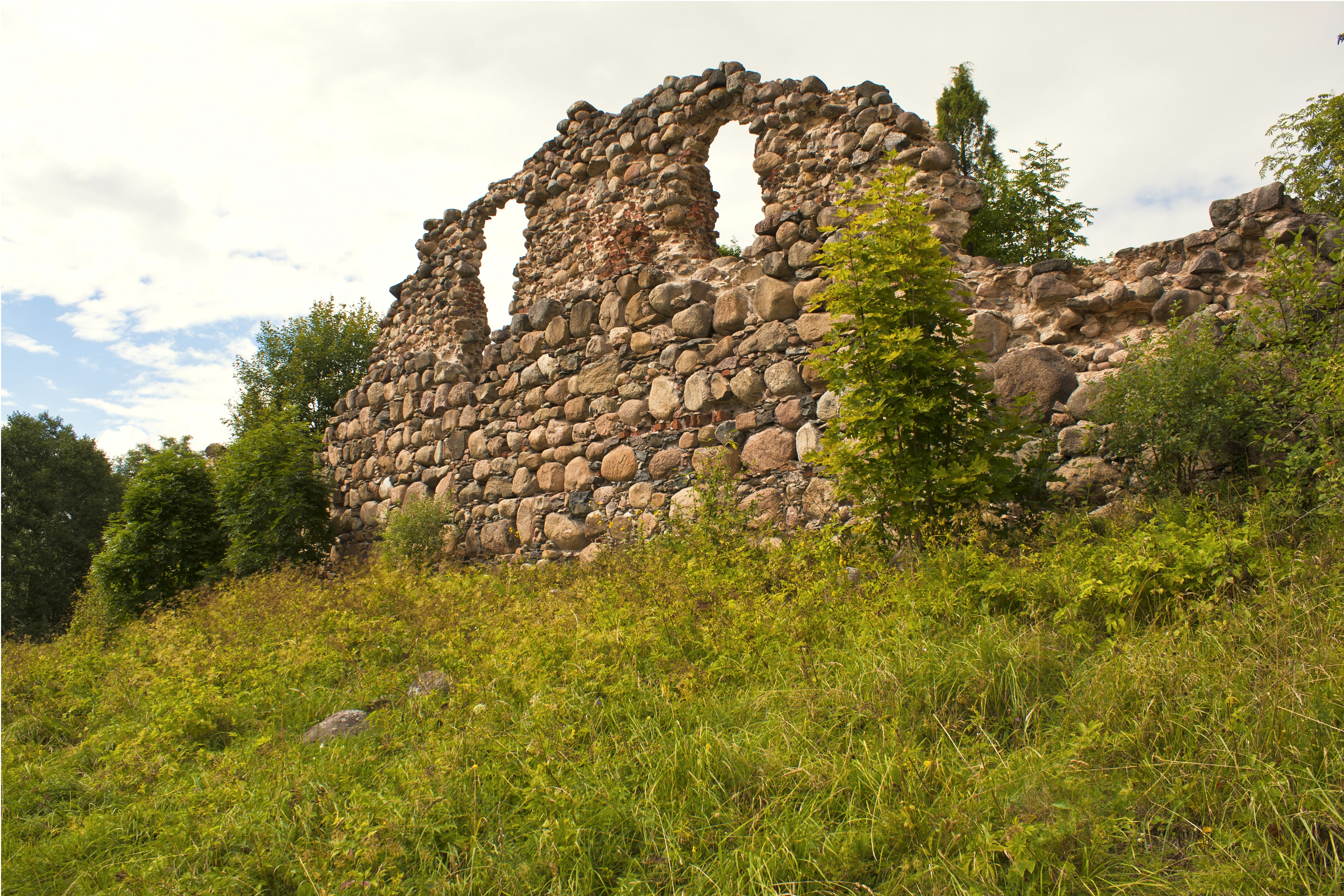

Site information
- Type: Castle
- Condition: Ruins

Location
- Coordinates: 57°3′22.98″N 25°49′11.70″E

Vecpiebalga Castle (Latvian: Vecpiebalgas pilsdrupas), also called Piebalga Castle, is a bishop's castle in Cēsis Municipality in the Vidzeme region of Latvia.

== See also ==
- List of castles in Latvia
