= Aleksandrs Čaks =

Latvian writer (1901-1950)

Aleksandars Čaks
- Aleksandrs Čaks in 1945
- Born: October 27, 1901; Rīga, Russian Empire (Now Latvia)
- Died: February 8, 1950 (aged 48); Rīga, Latvian SSR (Now Latvia)
- Occupations: Poet, writer

Aleksandrs Čaks [ɑ.lɛk.sɑndrs tʃɑks] (born Aleksandrs Čadarainis; 27 October 1901 – 8 February 1950), was a Latvian poet and writer. Čaks is arguably the first Latvian writer whose works are distinctly urban, compared to the usual depictions of country life or small villages in earlier Latvian literature.

== Biography ==
He was born in Riga to a tailor's family, and, continuing to live in Riga, he followed the city's life in his poetry. In 1911 he started studies in Alexanders Gymnasium in Riga. After First World War started, he was evacuated first to Võru, Estonia and later to Saransk, Russia. During his gymnasium days, he was often seen reading philosophical works. His most preferred works were of Kant, Nietzsche and Hegel. In 1919-1920 Čaks worked in Penza local hospital and, possibly, took a medical-assistant course in Saransk or Penza; on 1920 he was not allowed to return to Latvia, and was assigned to studies in workers-peasant university in Penza.

In 1922, Čaks returned to Latvia. In Riga, he graduated Riga State German Grammar School and applied for medicine studies in the University of Latvia. However, he soon lost interest regarding medicine and left his studies. In 1925, Čaks received a teachers certificate and started to work in Drabeši primary school as a teacher and administrator. He left this job in 1927 to devote himself to literature. In 1928 Čaks established a literary magazine called "Jauno Lira" for young Latvian writers and poets. He also participated in left-aligned magazine "Trauksme". From 1930 to 1934, Čaks was a secretary in the Latvian writer and journalist trade union, and was one of the editors of a design-oriented magazine "Domas".

After the K. Ulmanis coup in 1934, all trade unions, non-government aligned political magazines and political parties were banned. From 1934 until 1939, Aleksandrs Čaks worked as a clerk in the Riga city savings bank. At the same time, he began to give lectures about literature in private schools. In addition to that, he worked as technical editor in Association of Latvian Riflemen, where he helped to publish a collection of documents and memories entitled "Latviešu strēlnieki". Inspired by memories of the riflemen, he wrote a collection of epic poems "Mūžības Skartie" (1937, "Touched by Eternity"), for which he got the A. Brigadere prize in 1939. From 1939 until 1940 he worked in one of the biggest Latvian magazines titled "Atpūta".

After the Soviet occupation of Latvia in 1940, Čaks was criticized for anti-soviet undertones in several poems from "Mūžības Skartie". Nonetheless, he was accepted into the writers union of the Latvian SSR in Spring 1941. After the Latvian occupation by Nazi Germany, Čaks was not allowed to publish and lived very privately. In 1943 he wrote a play titled "Matīss, kausu bajārs."

After the Soviet Army entered Riga for the second time in October 1944, Čaks started to work in one of the biggest Soviet newspapers titled "Cīņa" where he led a cultural section. However, already in 1946 campaign of criticism was turned against Čaks's literary career, and in 1947 he was fired from the Cīņa newspaper. He started to work in the Institute of Language and Literature of the Latvian Academy of Sciences.

However, criticism of him continued. In 1949, with Latvia being a part of the Soviet Union, Čaks was accused of straying from Marxist values and writing politically incorrect works.

The accusations, which caused heavy damage towards Čaks's health, caused his death of heart disease on February 8, 1950.

Currently, one of the central streets of Riga is named after him. There's also a memorial museum in that street and a statue in nearby Ziedoņdārzs Park.

== Works ==
Čaks published his first poetry books, "Es un šis laiks" and "Sirds uz trotuāra" in 1928, dedicated to Riga and its life. These poems included topics and characters previously not depicted in Latvian poetry – city night life, homeless people, prostitutes, poor suburbs, even the sewers in blockhouses. In his works, Čaks shows his deep love for Riga as it is, which is well seen in the title of a poem in his second book, "Heart on the Pavement". Riga is not the only subject of his poems, though – Čaks also wrote romantic poetry and works dedicated to the Latvian riflemen, "Mūžības skartie" (1937, "Touched by Eternity") being a significant representative of the rifflemen theme in Latvian literature. Čaks also wrote some short stories, although they are generally not as well known as his poems. He also wrote a few plays namely the children's play ''Nagla, Tomāts un Plūmīte'' together with Ēriks Ādamsons, "Pusnakts kuģis'' together with Jūlijs Vanags and "Matīss, kausu bajārs". He also translated many works into Latvian importantly his collaboration with Ēriks Ādamsons for translating The Threepenny Opera by Bertold Brecht and many others.

== See also ==
- Drabeši Manor
- Inara Cedrins, "Between Two Rains." Selected poems translated into English, e-book, 2013. ISBN B00C10SNZG. https://www.amazon.com/Between-Two-Rains-Aleksandrs-Caks-ebook/dp/B00C10SNZG

== Bibliography ==
From the collection of the Library of Congress, Washington, DC:

- Augstā krastā (1950)
- Č-a-k-s (2005) 4 volumes; Facsim. reprints. Originally published: Seši, 1928, and Zaļā vārna, 1929.
- Cīņai un darbam; dzejas (1951)
- Debesu dāvana: vienas vasaras dzejoļi (1980)
- Dvēsele kabatā: dzeja (2000) ISBN 9984-05-300-8
- Dzejas izlase (1996) ISBN 9984-04-410-6
- Igra zhiznʹi︠u︡ (1970)
- Izlase (1971) 2 volumes.
- Kārlis Skalbe: raksti un atmiņas (1999) ISBN 9984-17-597-9
- Kļava lapa (1969)
- Kopoti raksti: 6 sējumos (1991–2001) 5 volumes. ISBN 5-7966-0268-3
- Kremlī pie Ļeņina (1980)
- Mana mīlestība (1958)
- Mana paradīze (1951)
- Mana Rīga: dzejoļi un poēmas (1961)
- Mūžības skartie (1950)
- Mūžības skartie: dzejas par latviešu strēlniekiem (1981, 1988) ISBN 5-410-00321-7
- Patrioti, dzejojumi un dzejoļi (1948)
- Raksti (1971)
- Rīga: 30. gadi (1983)
- Savādais gaidītājs: dzeja un proza (2004) ISBN 9984-05-738-0
- Selected poems Preface and selection by Arvīds Grigulis; translated by Ruth Speirs. (1979)
- Spēle ar dzīvību: noveles, stāsti, tēlojumi (2000) ISBN 9984-17-331-3
- Tikai tevi es mīlējis esmu: dzejoļi (1986)
- Umurkumurs (1968)
- Vēlais viesis (2005) ISBN 9984-720-88-8
- Zelta ielāps: dzejas izlase 1972 (1972)
- Zem cēlās zvaigznes; dzejoļi un dzejojumi (1948)

== Sources ==
- Apinis, Pēteris (2006). A Hundred Great Latvians. Riga: Nacionālais apgāds. p. 118. ISBN 9984-26-288-X. OCLC 238892134.
