= Atis Kronvalds =

Latvian writer (1837–1875)

- Atis Kronvalds
- Born: 15 April 1837; Bunka parish, Russian Empire
- Died: 17 February 1875 (aged 37); Vecpiebalga, Russian Empire
- Occupations: Writer, linguist and pedagogue
- Partner: Karolīne Kronvalde
- Writing career
- Literary movement: Young Latvians

Atis Kronvalds or Kronvaldu Atis (15 April 1837 – 17 February 1875) was a Latvian writer, linguist and pedagogue, as well as a prominent member of the Young Latvia movement.

== Early life ==
Kronvalds was born to a tailor's family, but he was raised by priests in Durbe. After studying in Liepāja, he became a private teacher. In 1860 he started studying medicine at the University of Berlin; however, he left after half a year when he ran out of money. He returned to Latvia, where he resumed work as a private teacher in Durbe.

== Participation in "Young Latvians" movement ==
After returning to Latvia, Kronvalds joined the Latvian nationalist movement "Young Latvians" and became a passionate advocate of Latvian rights, language, and culture. In 1865 he moved to Tartu to study pedagogy at the University of Tartu. In 1868 he became a teacher at the teacher seminary there. He participated in the social activities of local Latvian society; notably, he renewed the "Latvian evenings" tradition begun by Krišjānis Valdemārs. He also wrote works of educational theory and several articles on education and linguistics. In 1872 he wrote Nationale Bestrebungen, the manifesto of the Young Latvians. In 1873 Kronvalds moved to Vecpiebalga, where he worked as a teacher in a local school; he also participated by delivering two speeches, in the first Latvian Song and Dance Festival in the same year. He is one of the most famous Latvian authors of all time.

== Works ==
- Dzeja jeb poēzija (1869)
- Vecas valodas jauni vārdi (1869)
- Tēvuzemes mīlestība (1871)
- Valodas kopējiem (1872)
- Nationale Bestrebungen (1872)
- Tautiskie centieni (1887)
- Kopoti raksti 2 sēj. (1936–1937)
- Selected works Tagadnei (1987)
