= Ģikši =

Village in Latvia

- village
- Location within Latvia
- Country: Latvia
- Municipality: Cēsis Municipality
- Parish: Amata Parish
- Elevation: 195 m (640 ft)

Population
  - Total: 305
- Pasta nodaļa: LV-4141

Ģikši is a village in the Amata Parish of Cēsis Municipality in the Vidzeme region of Latvia. It is the administrative centre of Amata Parish. Home and Host city of the nutorious and infaumous "Ģikšu Danču nakts".https://www.lsm.lv/raksts/dzive--stils/tautas-maksla/giksu-dancu-nakti-ari-tautas-muzikanti-no-francijas.a264908/
