= Straupe =

Village in Latvia

- Town
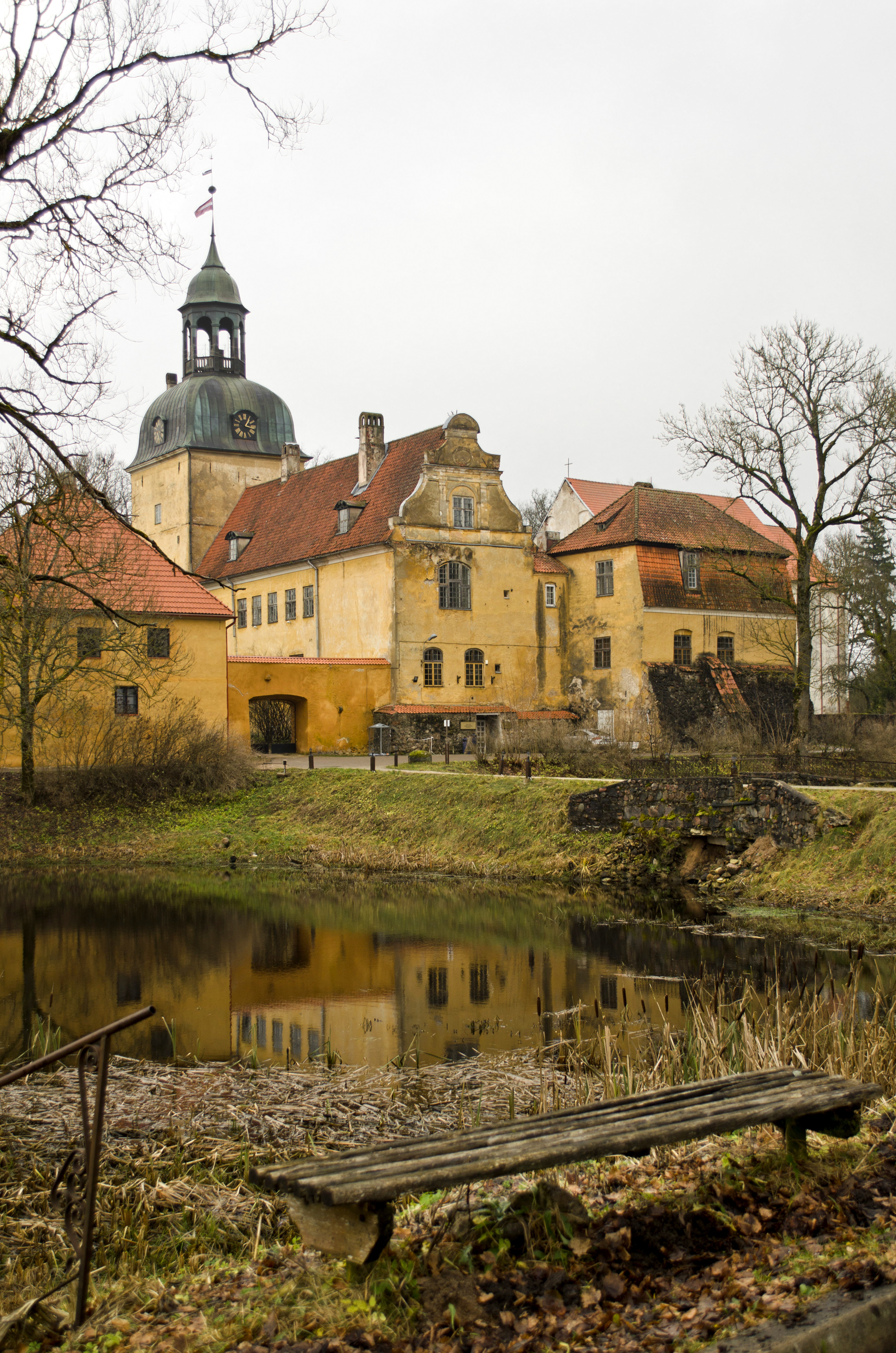
- Lielstraupe Castle at Straupe village

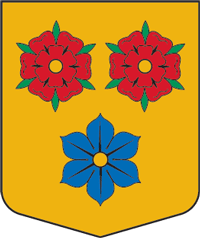
- Coat of arms
- Nickname: German: Roop
- Location in Latvia
- Coordinates: 57°20.822′N 24°56.852′E
- Country: Latvia
- Municipality: Cēsis
- Town rights: 1356
- Lost town rights: 17th century

Population (2017)
  - Total: 475
- Time zone: UTC+2 (EET)
  - Summer (DST): UTC+3 (EEST)
- Calling code: +371 51
- Website: http://www.straupe.lv/

Straupe (German: Lielstraupe/Roop/Groß-Roop; Estonian: Raupa/Roopa) is a village in Straupe Parish, Cēsis Municipality in the Vidzeme region of Latvia.

== History ==
Before the village was founded, the area was a part of the ancient Idumea country. When the von Rosen family arrived, they first started building what would become the Lielstraupe Castle in the 13th century. By the 14th century the village of Straupe began to develop around the castle and later became the trade center. Due to its role along trade routes it became known in German as Roop, and received its town privileges in 1374. During the fourteenth century, Straupe flourished as part of the mercantile Hanseatic League and was on its way to becoming a 'Hansa City'. However, the town was destroyed during the fierce fighting of the Polish–Swedish War (1600–29). While mostly rebuilt, Straupe had lost its trade significance and eventually reverted back to village status by the 17th century. During the Latvian War of Independence, Straupe witnessed fighting between Estonian-Latvian and German Landeswehr forces in the Battle of Cesis (1919).

== Origin of name ==
It is possible that Straupe name comes from the Livonian language word raupa, meaning "running water."

== See also ==
- Lielstraupe Castle
