= Drabeši (village) =

Village in Latvia

- village
- Location within Latvia
- Country: Latvia
- Municipality: Cēsis Municipality
- Parish: Drabeši Parish
- Elevation: 145 m (476 ft)

Population
  - Total: 119
- Pasta nodaļa: LV-4101

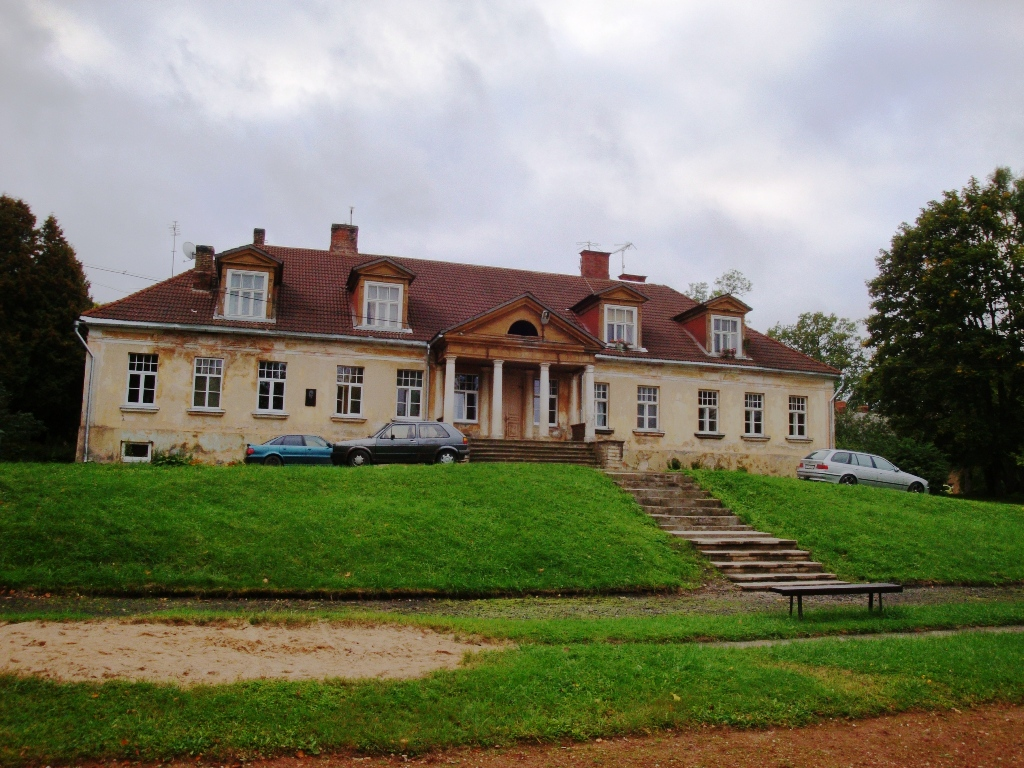
Drabeši Manor

Drabeši is a village in Drabeši Parish, Cēsis Municipality in the Vidzeme region of Latvia.
