= Vecpiebalga Parish =

Parish of Latvia

- parish of Latvia
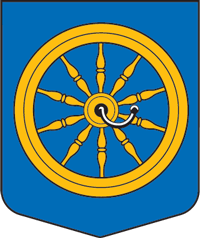
- Coat of arms

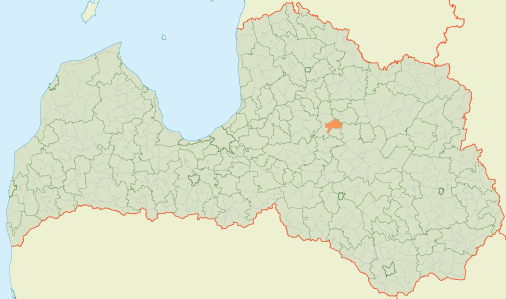
- 57°04′40″N 25°47′07″E
- Country: Latvia

Area
  - Total: 110.14 km^{2} (42.53 sq mi)
  - Land: 99.05 km^{2} (38.24 sq mi)
  - Water: 11.09 km^{2} (4.28 sq mi)

Population (1 January 2024)
  - Total: 1,281
  - Density: 12/km^{2} (30/sq mi)

Vecpiebalga Parish (Latvian: Vecpiebalgas pagasts) is an administrative unit of Cēsis Municipality, Latvia. It is one of the 21 parishes in this municipality. The parish center is Vecpiebalga.

Before the administrative reform of 2021, Vecpiebalga Parish was one of the 5 parishes in the former Vecpiebalga Municipality. Until 2009 Vecpiebalga Parish was one of the 21 parishes in the former Cēsis district. The territory is defined by Latvian law as a part of the region of Vidzeme.

Vecpiebalga Parish is the birthplace of the writers Reinis Kaudzīte, Matīss Kaudzīte and Kārlis Skalbe.
