= Drabeši Manor =

Manor house in Latvia

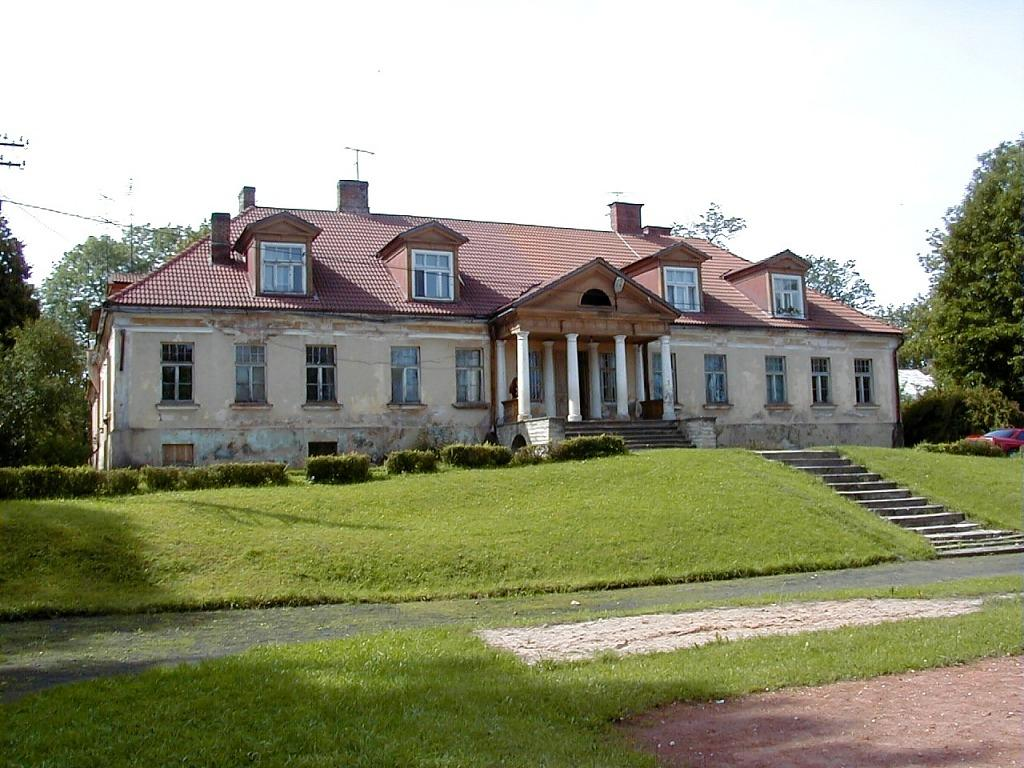

- Location within Latvia

General information
- Location: Drabeši Parish, Cēsis Municipality, Vidzeme, Latvia
- Coordinates: 57°14′38″N 25°16′46″E
- Completed: ~1820

Drabeši Manor (Latvian: Drabešu muižas pils) is a manor house in Drabeši Parish, Cēsis Municipality in the Vidzeme region of Latvia.

== History ==
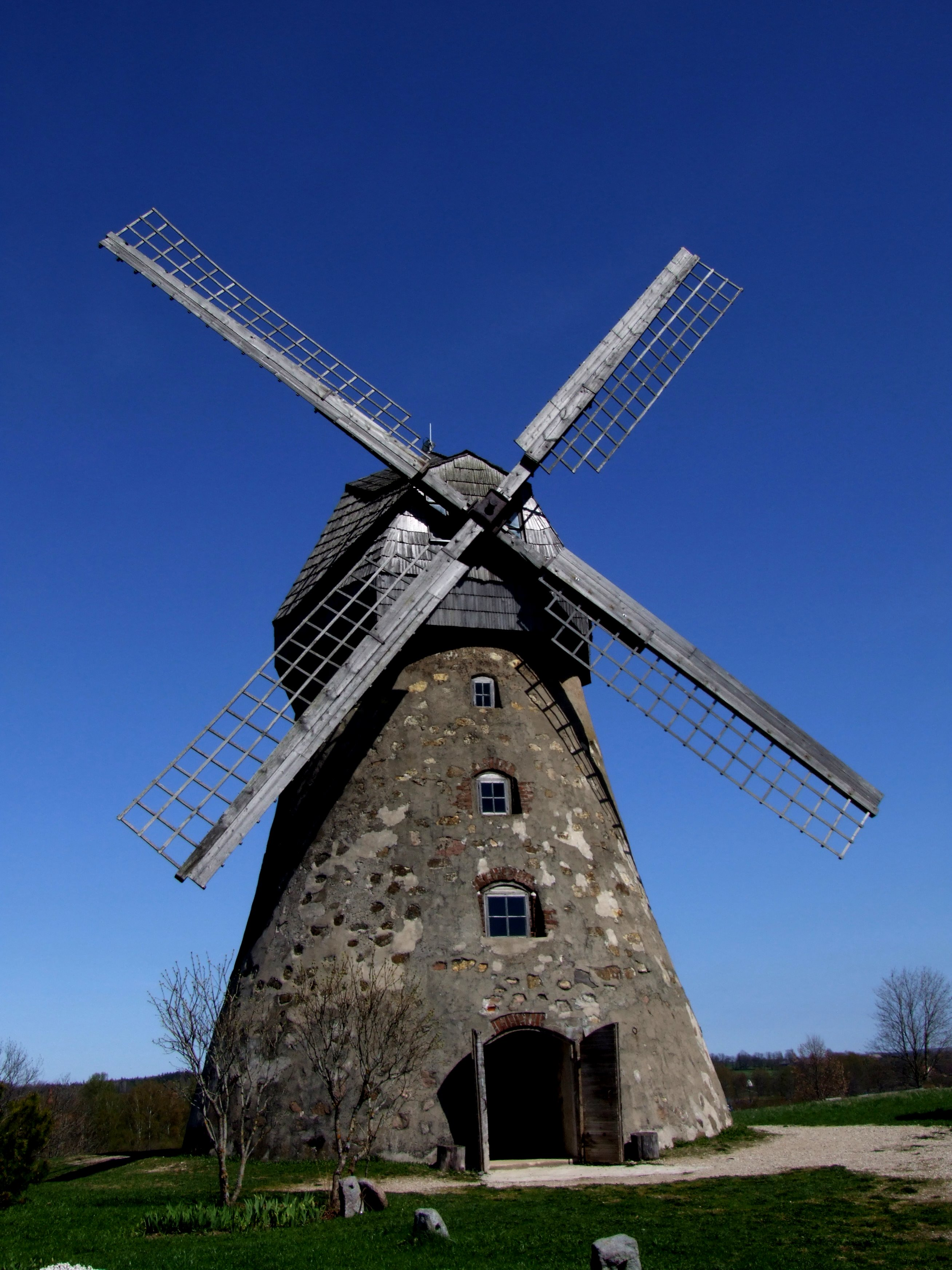
Āraiši Windmill on Drabeši estate.

The place-name Drabeši is derived from the Polish officer's surname Drobisz, the owner of the manor at the beginning of the 17th century. Since 1794 the estate belonged to the Blackenhagen family. The current manor was built in Classical style during the first quarter of the 19th century around 1820. It suffered severe fire damage during the 1905 Russian revolution, but was repaired prior to World War I.

After the agrarian reforms of the early 1920s, the building became first a children's home and then a primary school. The poet Aleksandrs Čaks worked there as a teacher and administrator from 1925 to 1927. In 1959 it became the Drabeši boarding primary school, which eventually outgrew the manor house and moved to a new larger building nearby.

The estate's windmill has been restored as a tourist attraction. Located south of the village of Drabeši and north of the village of Āraiši, it is now commonly called the Āraiši Windmill (Āraišu vējdzirnavas).

== See also ==
- List of palaces and manor houses in Latvia
