= Jaunpiebalga =

Village in Latvia

- Village
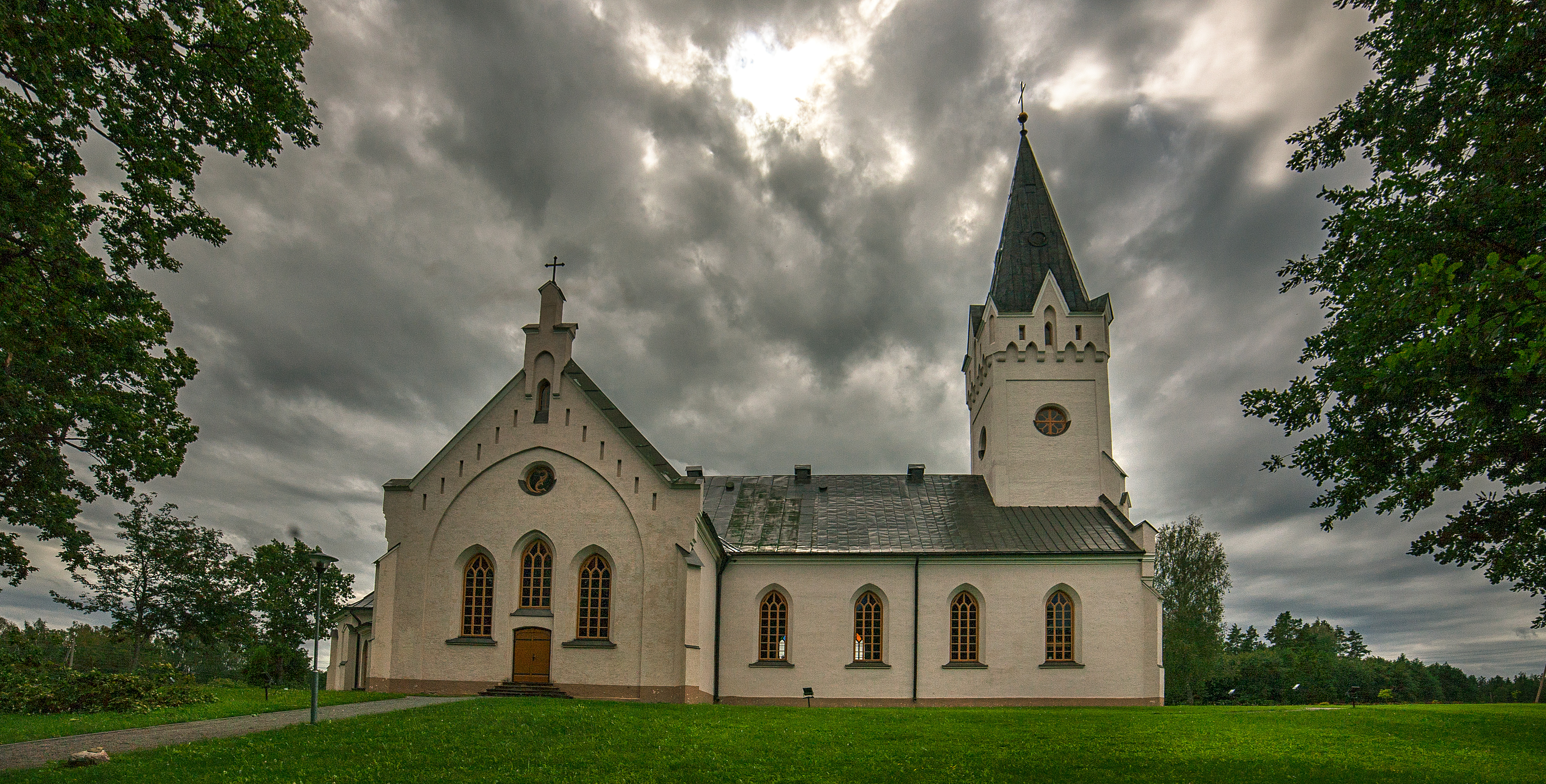
- Lutheran church in Jaunpiebalga

- Jaunpiebalga's location in Latvia
- Coordinates: 57°10′36″N 26°2′7″E
- Country: Latvia
- Municipality: Cēsis
- Parish: Jaunpiebalga

Population (2021)
  - Total: 880

Jaunpiebalga (German: Neu-Pebalg) is a village in Jaunpiebalga Parish, Cēsis Municipality in the Vidzeme region of Latvia. Jaunpiebalga had 880 residents as of 2021.
