= Amata Parish =

Parish of Latvia

- parish of Latvia
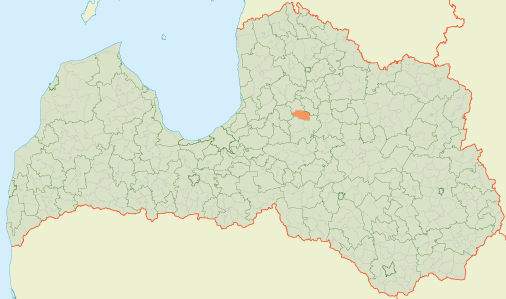
- Coordinates: 57°09′58″N 25°19′15″E
- Country: Latvia

Area
  - Total: 108.27 km^{2} (41.80 sq mi)

Population (1 January 2026)
  - Total: 617

Amata parish (Latvian: Amatas pagasts) is an administrative unit of Cēsis Municipality in the Vidzeme region of Latvia. Amata village is located in neighboring Drabeši Parish.

== Towns, villages and settlements of Amata parish ==
- Aparnieki
- Ģikši
- Rencēni
- Spāre
- Velmeri
- Zāģeri
