= Jaunpiebalga Parish =

Parish of Latvia

- parish of Latvia
- Coat of arms

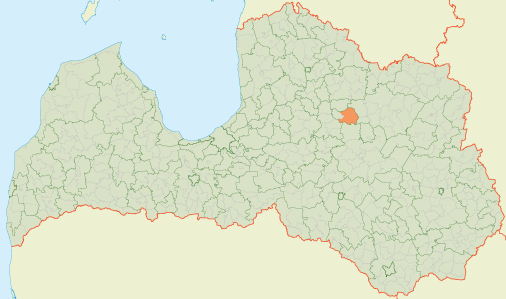
- Coordinates: 57°08′42″N 26°01′24″E
- Country: Latvia

Area
  - Total: 183.83 km^{2} (70.98 sq mi)

Population (1 January 2026)
  - Total: 1,546

Jaunpiebalga Parish (Latvian: Jaunpiebalgas pagasts) is an administrative unit of Cēsis Municipality in the Vidzeme region of Latvia.

== Towns, villages and settlements of Jaunpiebalga parish ==
- Jaunpiebalga
- Abrupe
