= Kārlis Skalbe =

Latvian writer

- Kārlis Skalbe
- Born: 7 November 1879; Vecpiebalga parish, Russian Empire (now Latvia)
- Died: 14 April 1945 (aged 65); Stockholm, Sweden
- Occupation: writer
- Writing career
- Notable awards: Order of the Three Stars 3rd Class; Order of the Lithuanian Grand Duke Gediminas

Kārlis Skalbe (7 November [O.S. 26 October] 1879 – April 14, 1945) was a Latvian writer, poet, and activist. He is best known for his 72 fairy tales, written for adults and children. He has been called the 'King of Fairytales', and his words, Tēvzemei un Brīvībai (For Fatherland and Freedom), are inscribed on the Monument of Freedom in Riga.

== Childhood and schooling ==
Skalbe was born in Vecpiebalga Parish, in the heart of Vidzeme, symbolically the same year that one of the other greats of Latvian literature, the poet Auseklis (Miķelis Krogzemis), died in exile. His father Jānis was a blacksmith; his mother, Ede, was, like his father, a Piebalga native. The Skalbes had ten children of which Kārlis was the youngest; five of his siblings died in early childhood.

Skalbe's parents were devout Moravian Christians. Skalbe himself learned to read at 7, taught by his mother. Skalbe's mother took over as head of the household when his father died at 55, when Skalbe was only 8. Their means were meager—Skalbe's mother worked for neighbors as a menial laborer.

Skalbe first entered school in Veļķe Parish, attending from 1887 to 1890. There he developed a close relationship with Ernests Felsbergs, later art history professor and rector of the University of Latvia, as a teacher. Skalbe's first encounter with poetry, however, was not at school but during his four summers as a shepherd, where in his bed under the hay mattress he found a long mislaid book of poems by Pēteris Ceriņš, a lyric poet active in the 1860s and 70's. Skalbe wrote his first poem at 12.

From 1890 to 1895 (approximate), Skalbe attended the Vecpiebalga congregational school, where his sister Līze helped pay for his studies. His schoolmates included H. Albāts, to become a diplomat; and Jānis Roze, to become a book publisher whose premier publishing house is still active today. Skalbe furthered his religious studies, was schooled in essay writing, and was exposed to and deeply influenced by the novels of Turgenev and Dostoyevsky.

In 1910 he married Lizete Erdmane, a translator (1886-1972).

== Beginnings as an author ==
Skalbe's next steps leaving school were unclear. His sister tried to place him with a bookseller, Veinbergs, in Rīga, but Skalbe didn't know German. He landed a job at another bookseller, Bērziņš, where he lasted all of one day. His most memorable experience in all of this was his initial trip to Rīga, captured later in his memoir Mans Ziemassvētku brauciens (My Christmas Ride, 1933).

Skalbe began his fairy tale authorship in 1904 with the novella-tale, "How I travelled in search of the North Maiden" (Kā es braucu Ziemaļmeitas lūkoties), a tribute to his wife and a parody of a tale by the older writer Andrievs Niedra. His fairy tales were influenced by the modernist currents among his contemporaries, such as Jānis Akuraturs as well as Hans Christian Andersen and the decadent fairy tales of Oscar Wilde, which he translated into Latvian. He partly wrote the collection, "Winter's Tales" (1913) while imprisoned for revolutionary activity, which includes some of his most well known tales, such as "The Kitty's Windmill" (Kaķīša Dzirnavas) and his own version of "Cinderella" (Pelņrušķīte), influenced by Latvian folklore.

== Career ==
Slakbe worked as a teacher and journalist, and was active in the politics first republic. After the 1905 revolution he moved to Switzerland, Finland and Norway. He returned to Latvia in 1909 and was later sent to jail for 18 months for revolutionary activities. He fought as a Latvian Rifleman in 1916. Skalbe was a member of the Latvian democratic party and participated in the first and fourth Saeima.

He stayed in Latvia until 1944 when it became obvious that after the war the USSR would again occupy Latvia. He then emigrated to Sweden but died a few months later.

In 1987 his former summer house was opened as a public museum dedicated to his life and works. During his lifetime, Skalbe was awarded the Order of the Three Stars 3rd Class and the Order of the Lithuanian Grand Duke Gediminas.

== Translations ==
"Cinderella" from the collection, "Winter's Tales" (1913).
