= Stalbe Parish =

Parish of Latvia

- parish of Latvia
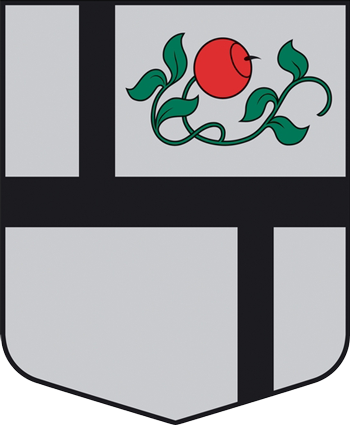
- Coat of arms

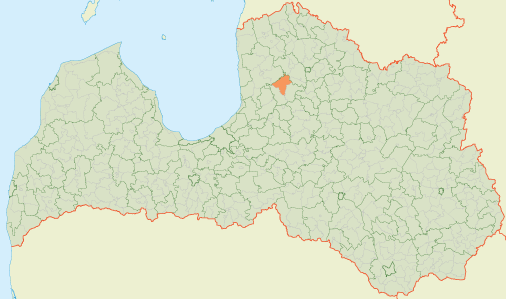
- Coordinates: 57°25′17″N 25°02′14″E
- Country: Latvia

Population (1 January 2026)
  - Total: 956

Stalbe Parish (Latvian: Stalbes pagasts) is an administrative unit of Cēsis Municipality in the Vidzeme region of Latvia. The administrative center is Stalbe.

== Towns, villages and settlements of Stalbe Parish ==
- Stalbe
- Rozula
