= Ineši Parish =

Parish of Latvia

- parish of Latvia
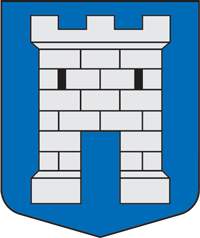
- Coat of arms

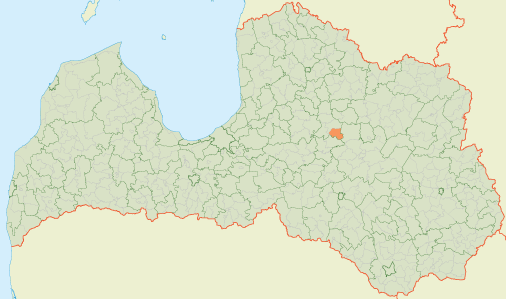
- 57°00′35″N 25°49′29″E
- Country: Latvia

Area
  - Total: 87.88 km^{2} (33.93 sq mi)
  - Land: 79.95 km^{2} (30.87 sq mi)
  - Water: 7.93 km^{2} (3.06 sq mi)

Population (1 January 2024)
  - Total: 546
  - Density: 6.2/km^{2} (16/sq mi)

Ineši Parish (Latvian: Inešu pagasts) is an administrative unit of Cēsis Municipality in the Vidzeme region of Latvia.
