= Stalbe =

Village in Latvia

- Village
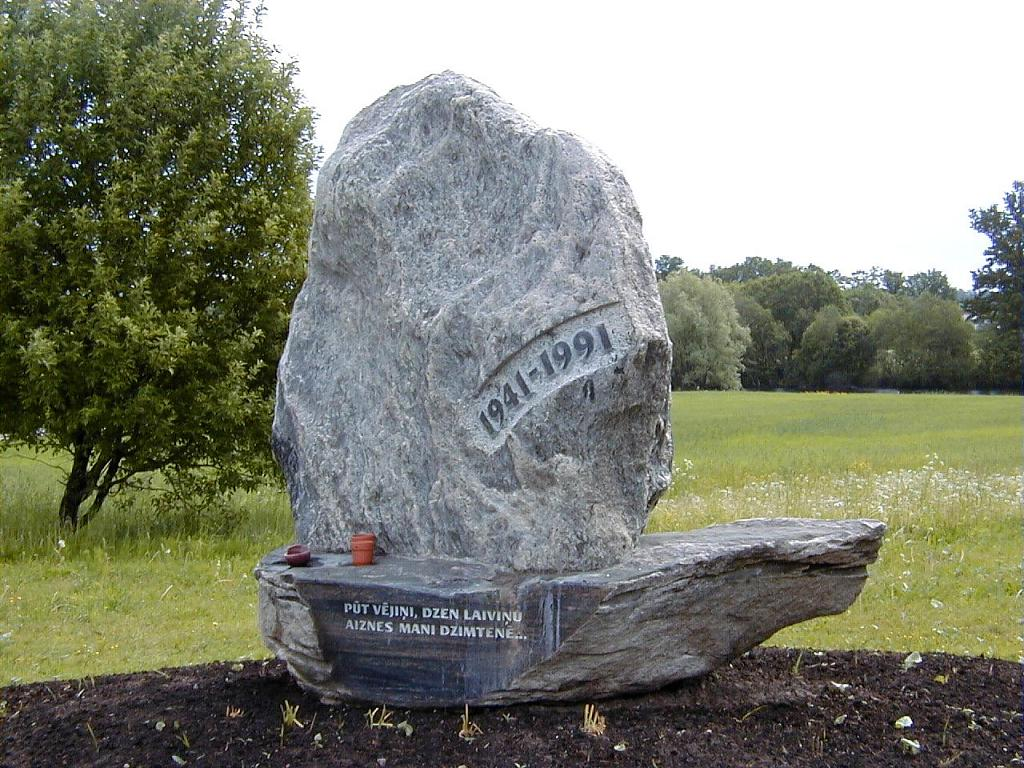
- The village contains a memorial dedicated to the victims of repression during the Soviet occupation of Latvia.

- Stalbe's location in Latvia
- Coordinates: 57°22′15.28″N 25°1′50.79″E
- Country: Latvia
- Municipality: Cēsis
- Parish: Stalbe

Population (2017)
  - Total: 365

Stalbe is a village in the Stalbe Parish of Cēsis Municipality in the Vidzeme region of Latvia.
