= Arvīds Grigulis =

- Born: 12 October 1906; Jumpravmuiža, Lādes parish, Governorate of Livonia, Russian Empire
- Died: 5 October 1989 (aged 82); Rīga, Latvian SSR, Soviet Union
- Education: University of Latvia
- Occupations: Playwright, poet, translator, scholar, politician
- Writing career
- Movement: Socialist realism

Arvīds Grigulis (12 October 1906 – 5 October 1989) was a Latvian Soviet writer, poet, playwright and literary scholar.

== Biography ==
Grigulis was born in 1906 in the family of a landowner who was formerly a teacher. In 1925, he graduated from Limbaži secondary school. He worked in Riga as a clerk in the Riga post office. His first publication was the poem "Stāst" in the literary supplement "Literature and Life" of the newspaper "Sociāldemokrats" in 1927. He participated in the work of the Workers' Theater and gave lectures on literature at the National University and was a member of the left-wing literary association Zemgalija.

At the same time, he studied natural sciences and law at the University of Latvia, obtaining a law degree. He resumed work at the post office as a clerk.

Grigulis welcomed the Soviet occupation of Latvia in June 1940 and worked in responsible positions in the cultural institutions of the Soviet Latvia. He was editor of the theater repertoire of the Ministry of Public Affairs, responsible secretary of the magazine Karogs and head of the State Fiction Publishing House. From 1941 to 1945 he was the Red Army, serving in the 43rd Guards Rifle Division. From 1942, he was the war correspondent of the front newspaper Latviešu Strēlnieks.

In 1944 he returned to Riga. In 1945, head of the literary supply of the State Supply and Printing Enterprises Board and then head of the literary department of the Drama Theater until 1947. He was a lecturer at the Faculty of Philology from and from 1973 a professor. From 1948 to 1962 he was head of the Department of Latvian Literature. Grigulis also was editor-in-chief of the Script Editorial Board of Riga Film Studio from 1962 to 1967. He became an Academician of the Latvian Academy of Sciences in 1973.

Grigulis joined the Communist Party in 1954. He was Deputy of the Supreme Soviet of the Latvian SSR (1947–1955, 1963–1985 and member of the Presidium of the Supreme Soviet of the Latvian SSR (1971–1985). He was a member of the Central Committee of the Communist Party of Latvia from 1971 to 1986.

Grigulis was buried in the Rainis cemetery in Riga, Latvia.

== Works ==
=== Poems ===
- Reportiera piezīmes (1929)
- Imitācija un sirds (1931)
- Nogurušo namā (1934)
- Zemnīcā (1943)
- Vētrā (1946)
- Rudens lietus (1966)
- Vējš dzied ezera vītolos (1968)
- Otrie gaiļi (1970)
- Marginālijas angļu valodas vārdnīcā Amerikas ceļojuma laikā (1972)
- Uz balta zirga (1977)
- Ar saules puķi pie cepures (1983)

=== Plays ===
- Logs uz priekšpilsētu (1933)
- Uz kuru ostu? (1945)
- Kā Garpēteros vēsturi taisīja (1946)
- Māls un porcelāns (1947) - PSRS Valsts prēmija
- Kramā ir uguns (1950)
- Profesors iekārtojas (1953)
- Karavīra šinelis (1955)
- Baltijas jūra šalc (1957)
- Nekur tā neiet kā pasaulē (1959)
- Savu lodi nedzird (1965)
- Šekspīrs mazgā traukus (1971)

=== Essays ===
- Vēstules dzejniecei Kamilai (1981) - LPSR Valsts prēmija
- Labvakar, Kamila! (1984)

=== Novels ===
- Cilvēki dārzā (1940)
- Kad lietus un vēji sitas logā (1964)

=== Collected articles ===
- Kopoti raksti, 7 sējumos (1963 - 1966)
