= Kaive Parish =

Parish of Latvia

- parish of Latvia
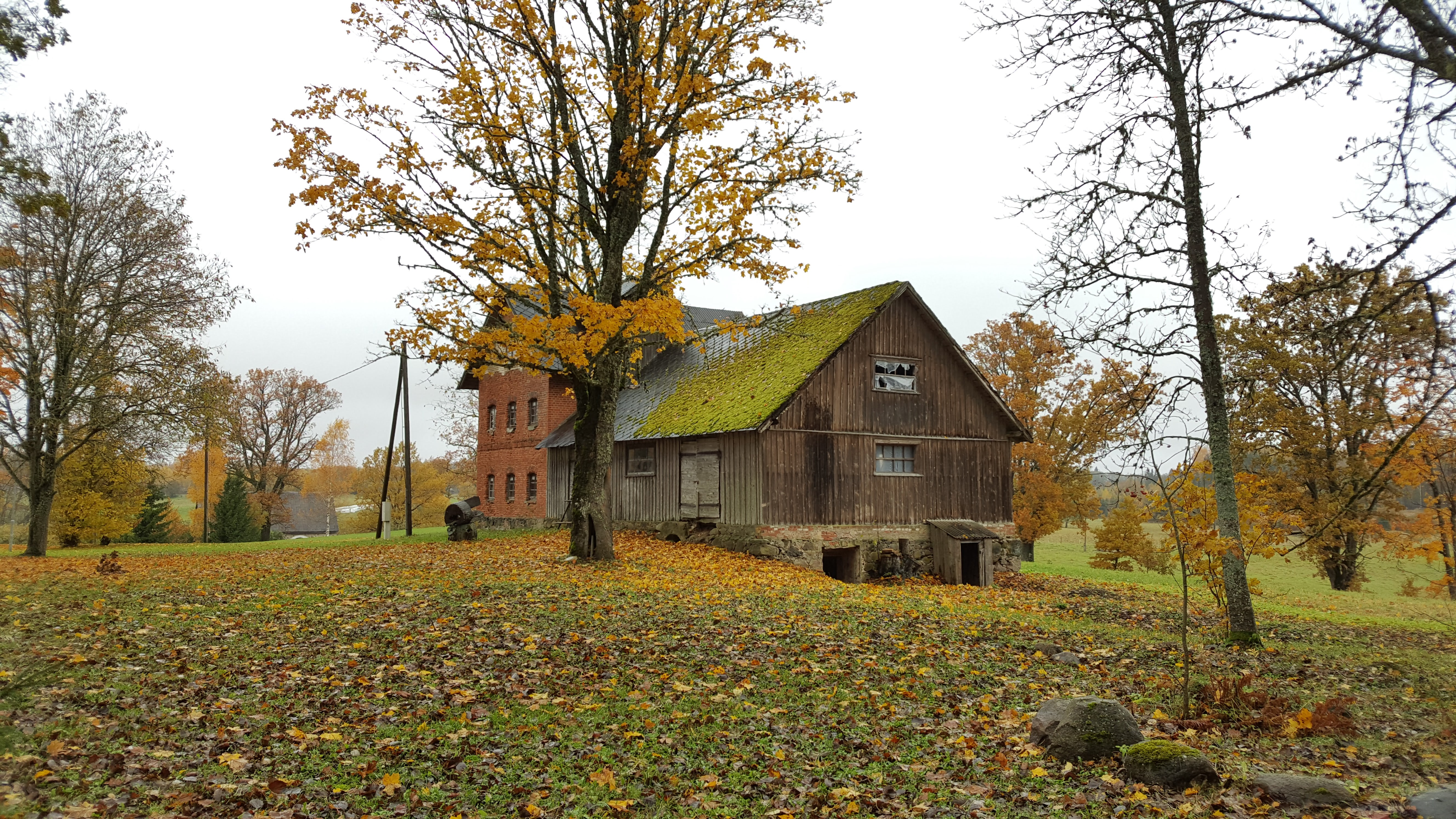

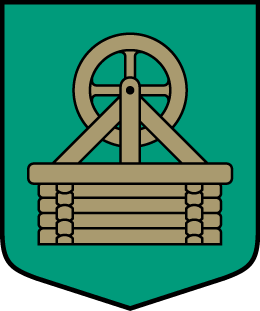
- Coat of arms

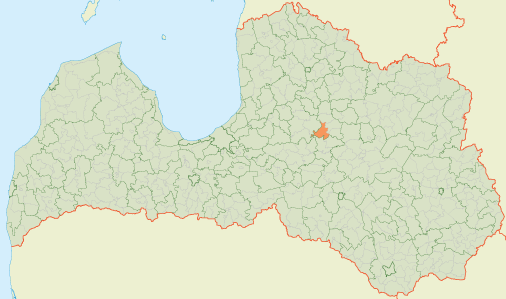
- 57°01′31″N 25°36′39″E
- Country: Latvia

Area
  - Total: 115.95 km^{2} (44.77 sq mi)
  - Land: 115.95 km^{2} (44.77 sq mi)
  - Water: 1.32 km^{2} (0.51 sq mi)

Population (1 January 2025)
  - Total: 269
  - Density: 2.32/km^{2} (6.01/sq mi)

Kaive Parish (Latvian: Kaives pagasts) is an administrative unit of Cēsis Municipality in the Vidzeme region of Latvia. It is one of the 21 parishes in this municipality. Before the administrative reform of 2009, Kaive Parish was part of the former Cēsis district.
