= Straupe Parish =

Parish of Latvia

- parish of Latvia
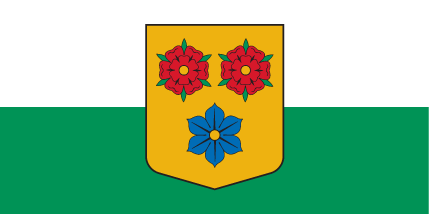
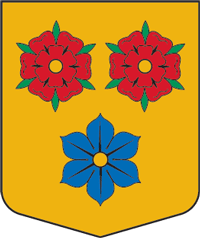
- Flag Coat of arms

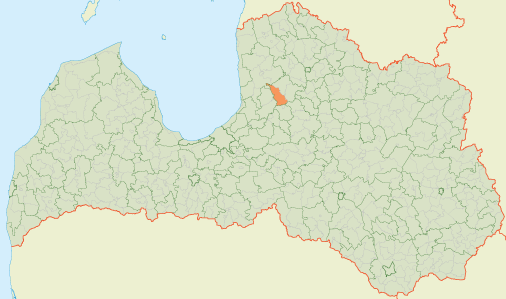
- Coordinates: 57°19′35″N 24°57′50″E
- Country: Latvia

Population (1 January 2026)
  - Total: 1,265

Straupe Parish (Latvian: Straupes pagasts) is an administrative unit of Cēsis Municipality in the Vidzeme region of Latvia (Prior to 2009, it was an administrative unit of Cēsis district). The administrative center is the village of Plācis.

== Towns, villages and settlements of Straupe parish ==
- Brasla
- Mazstraupe
- Plācis - parish administrative center
- Pušpūri
- Straupe
- Strautiņi
