= Reinis Kaudzīte =

Latvian schoolteacher and writer

- Born: May 12, 1839; Vecpiebalga Parish, Kreis Wenden, Governorate of Livonia, Russian Empire (now Latvia)
- Died: August 21, 1920 (aged 81); Vecpiebalga Parish, Latvia
- Occupation: writer

Reinis Kaudzīte (Old orthography: Reinis Kaudsit; May 12, 1839 – August 21, 1920), was a Latvian schoolteacher and writer. His novel The Times of the Surveyors was the first novel written in Latvian, coauthored with his brother Matīss Kaudzīte in 1879.

Reinis Kaudzīte was born in Mādari, Vecpiebalga Parish, in the heart of Vidzeme. He did not attend school himself, but he became a teacher of geography and religion classes at the Kalna Kaibēni parish school at the age of 28.

== The Times of the Surveyors ==
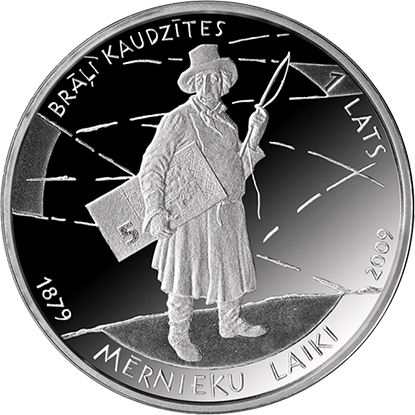
Commemorartive coin

The title refers to the times of the agrarian reform in the Governorate of Livonia, when the land was surveyed to establish the boundaries of the land plots.

In 1968, the Riga Film Studio made the film The Times of the Surveyors.
