= Drabeši Parish =

Parish of Latvia

- parish of Latvia
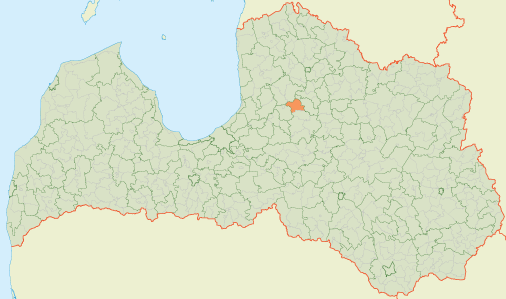
- 57°14′34″N 25°13′35″E
- Country: Latvia

Area
  - Total: 120.33 km^{2} (46.46 sq mi)
  - Land: 117.39 km^{2} (45.32 sq mi)
  - Water: 2.94 km^{2} (1.14 sq mi)

Population (1 January 2024)
  - Total: 2,324
  - Density: 19/km^{2} (50/sq mi)

Drabeši Parish (Latvian: Drabešu pagasts) is an administrative unit of Cēsis Municipality in the Vidzeme region of Latvia. The administrative center is Drabeši.

== Towns, villages and settlements of Drabeši parish ==
- Amata
- Āraiši
- Drabeši
- Ieriķi
- Kārļi
- Līvi
- Meijermuiža

== See also ==
- Āraiši lake fortress
- Drabeši Manor
