= Dzērbene Parish =

Parish of Latvia

- parish of Latvia
- Coat of arms

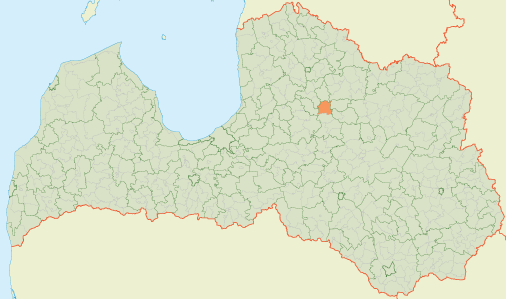
- 57°13′12″N 25°39′54″E
- Country: Latvia

Area
  - Total: 124.66 km^{2} (48.13 sq mi)
  - Land: 120.67 km^{2} (46.59 sq mi)
  - Water: 3.99 km^{2} (1.54 sq mi)

Population (1 January 2024)
  - Total: 763
  - Density: 6.1/km^{2} (16/sq mi)

Dzērbene Parish (Latvian: Dzērbenes pagasts) is an administrative unit of Cēsis Municipality in the Vidzeme region of Latvia. It is one of the 21 parishes in this municipality (Before the administrative reform of 2009, Dzērbene Parish was one of the 21 parishes in the former Cēsis district).
