= Vecpiebalga =

Village in Latvia

- Village
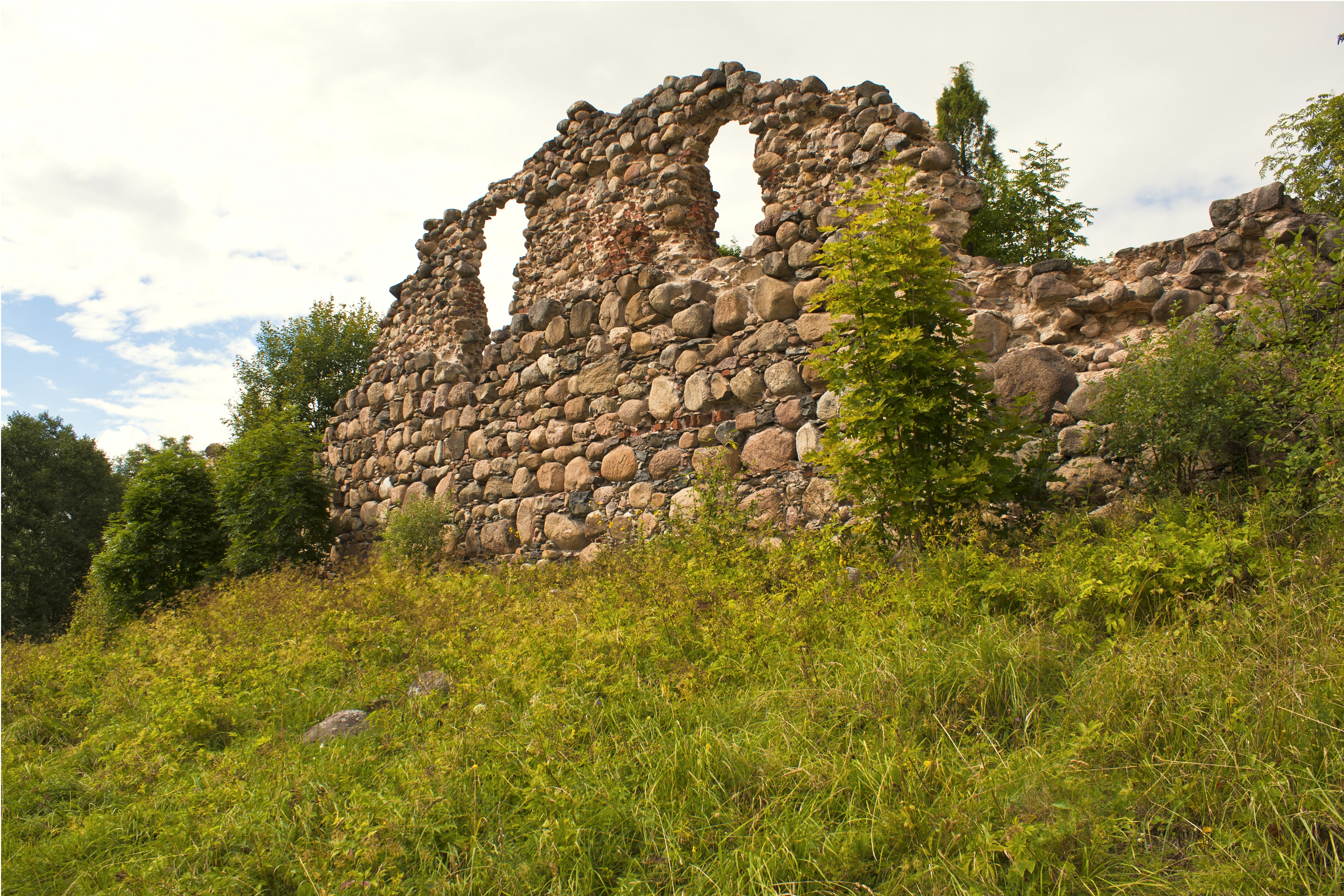
- Ruins of Vecpiebalga Castle in Vecpiebalga

- Location of Vecpiebalga within Latvia
- Coordinates: 57°3′43″N 25°48′39″E
- Country: Latvia
- Municipality: Cēsis
- Parish: Vecpiebalga

Population (2017)
  - Total: 501

Vecpiebalga (German: Alt-Pebalg) is a village in Vecpiebalga Parish, Cēsis Municipality, in the Vidzeme region of Latvia. Vecpiebalga had 501 residents as of 2017.

Vecpiebalga is an important village in Latvian cultural identity.

The first Latvian novel, Mērnieku laiki (The Time of the Land Surveyors), was written in Vecpiebalga by two schoolteachers, Reinis Kaudzīte and Matīss Kaudzīte. Written during the Latvian national awakening in 1879, the novel details the transition from a communal way of life to a more modern, individualistic way of life. The village was also an important center of weaving Latvian textiles. The ruins of Vecpiebalga Castle are in the village.
