= Cēsis Municipality =

Municipality of Latvia

Coordinates: 57.2667°N 25.3833°E

Cēsis Municipality Cēsu novads
- Municipality
- Flag Coat of arms

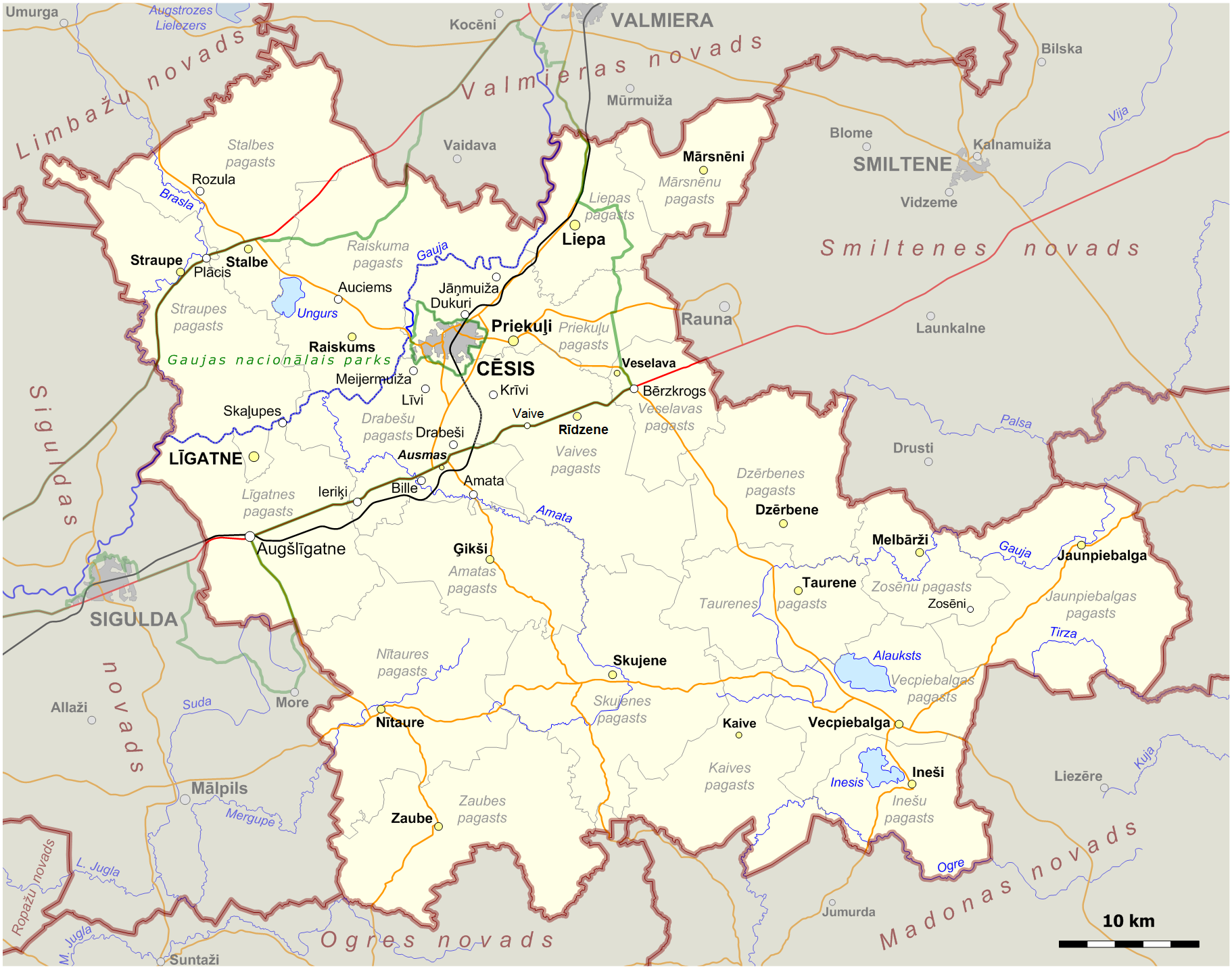
- Country: Latvia
- Formed: 2009
- Reformed: 2021
- Centre: Cēsis

Government
  - Council Chairman: Jānis Rozenbergs (V)

Area
  - Total: 2,668 km^{2} (1,030 sq mi)

Population (2021)
  - Total: 41,161
  - Density: 15.43/km^{2} (39.96/sq mi)
- Website: www.cesis.lv

Cēsis Municipality (Latvian: Cēsu novads) is a municipality in Vidzeme region of Latvia. The town of Cēsis is the administrative centre of the municipality. As of 2021, the region had a population of 41,161 inhabitants, making it the sixth most populated of the 36 municipalities in the country. The municipality was established during the administrative reform in 2009 and was expanded further in 2021. It consists of the town of Cēsis and 21 parishes.

== History ==
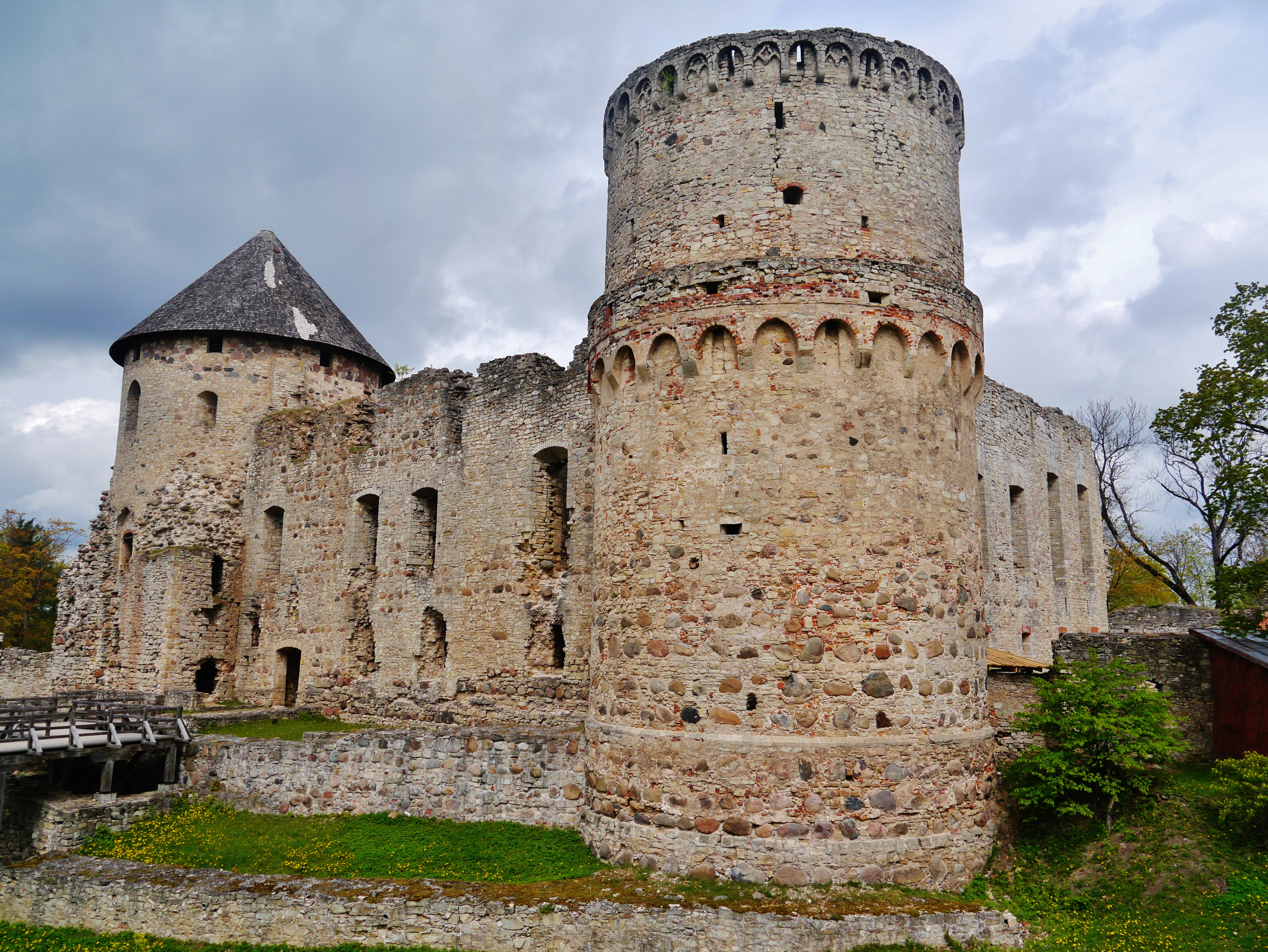
Cēsis Castle

Archeological evidence from the Cesis region have yielded tools from the Stone Age. The region was inhabited by early Baltic Tribes before the 10th century. The Cesis castle was commissioned in 1209, and served as the residence of the Grand Master of the German Livonian Order, who ruled over the lands of modern-day Estonia and Latvia. The Lutheran church of St. John also dates to the time period. In the 13th century, the Latvian flag was utilized in the region for the first time. The region was a location of a mass suicide event in 1577, as nearly 300 inhabitants killed themselves during the Russian siege. The region played a key role in the Latvian War of Independence and served as a cite of a battle in 1919. A monument has since been erected at the site of the battle. The municipality was established during the administrative reform in 2009. On 1 July 2021, the municipality was enlarged when Amata Municipality, Jaunpiebalga Municipality, Līgatne Municipality, Pārgauja Municipality, Priekuļi Municipality and Vecpiebalga Municipality were merged into it.

== Geography ==
Cēsis municipality is a municipality located in Vidzeme region of Latvia. It is spread over an area of 2,668 km^{2} (1,030 sq mi). The town of Cēsis is the administrative centre of the municipality. It is bordered by the municipalities of Smiltene, Ogre, Madona, and Valmiera. It consists of the town of Cēsis and 21 parishes– Amata, Drabeši, Dzērbene, Ineši, Jaunpiebalga, Kaive, Liepa, Līgatne, Mārsnēni, Nītaure, Priekuļi, Raiskums, Skujene, Stalbe, Straupe, Taurene, Vaive, Vecpiebalga, Veselava, Zaube, Zosēni. As of 2021, the region had a population of 41,161 inhabitants, making it the sixth most populated of the 36 municipalities in the country.

== Notable people ==
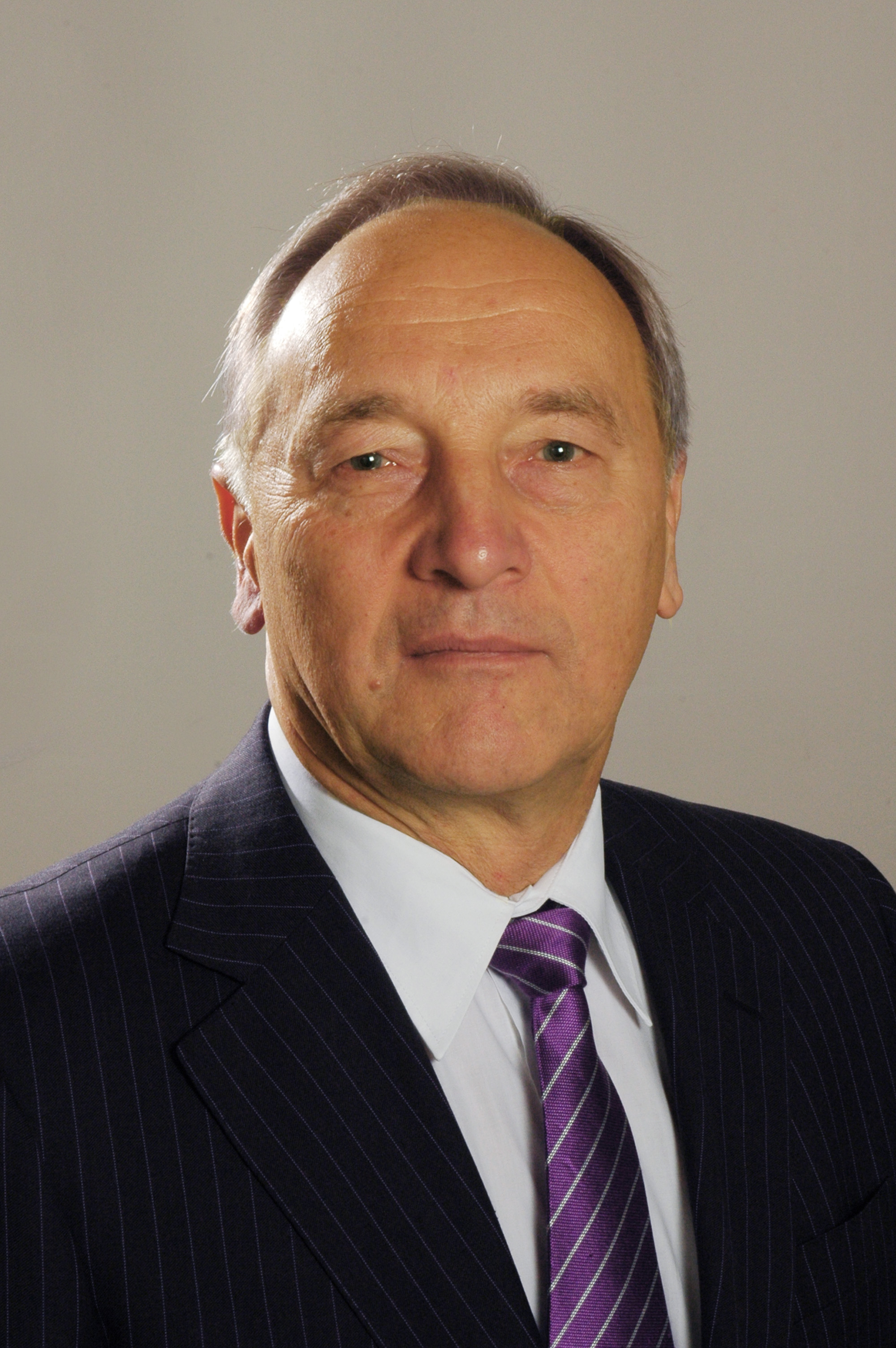
Andris Bērziņš, 2010

- Conrad von Rosen (1628 in Straupe – 1715), a Baltic German soldier in the French army under Louis XIV.
- Balthasar von Campenhausen (1772 in Pārgauja Municipality – 1823), a Baltic German Russian statesman, privy councilor and chamberlain.
- Reinis Kaudzīte (1839 in Mādari – 1920), schoolteacher and writer, he co-wrote the first novel in Latvian
- Paul Walden (1863 in Rozulas – 1957), a Russian, Latvian and German stereochemist
- André Lapine (1866 in Skujene Parish – 1952), Canadian painter of horses and landscapes and portraits.
- Voldemārs Zāmuēls (1872 in Dzērbene parish – 1948), politician, Prime Minister of Latvia in 1924
- Emīls Dārziņš (1875 in Jaunpiebalga – 1910), a Latvian composer, conductor and music critic.
- Vilhelms Purvītis (1872 in Zaube Parish – 1945), landscape painter, founded the Latvian Academy of Art
- Kārlis Skalbe (1879 in Vecpiebalga Parish – 1945), a poet and writer of 72 fairy tales
- Otomārs Oškalns (1904 in Kaive Parish - 1947), communist and partisan fighter, Hero of the Soviet Union
- Romans Suta (1896 in Dzērbene Parish – 1944), modernist painter, graphic artist and stage designer.
- Marģeris Zariņš (1910 in Jaunpiebalga – 1993), composer and writer of Postmodern literature
- Jānis Andriksons (1912 in Vecpiebalga – 1967), speed skater, he competed at the 1936 Winter Olympics
- Edgar Silinsh (1927 in Līgatne – 1998), Soviet and Latvian scientist in the field of semiconductor physics
- Jānis Krūmiņš (1930 in Raiskums Parish – 1994), basketball player, team gold medallist at the 1956, 1960 & 1964 Summer Olympics.
- Andris Bērziņš (born 1944 in Nītaure), businessman and politician, President of Latvia, 2011 to 2015
- Jānis Strupulis (born 1949 in Vecpiebalga), sculptor and graphical designer of some Latvian coins showing Lats
- Andris Vilks (1963 in Jaunpiebalga – 2024), politician, Minister of Finance of Latvia from 2010 until 2014.

== Sister cities ==
Cēsis is twinned with:

- Achim, Germany
- Baku, Azerbaijan
- Gatchinsky District, Russia
- Konstancin-Jeziorna, Poland
- Rakvere, Estonia
- Rokiškis, Lithuania
- Tyresö, Sweden
- Zhovkva, Ukraine
- Loutraki, Greece

== Images ==
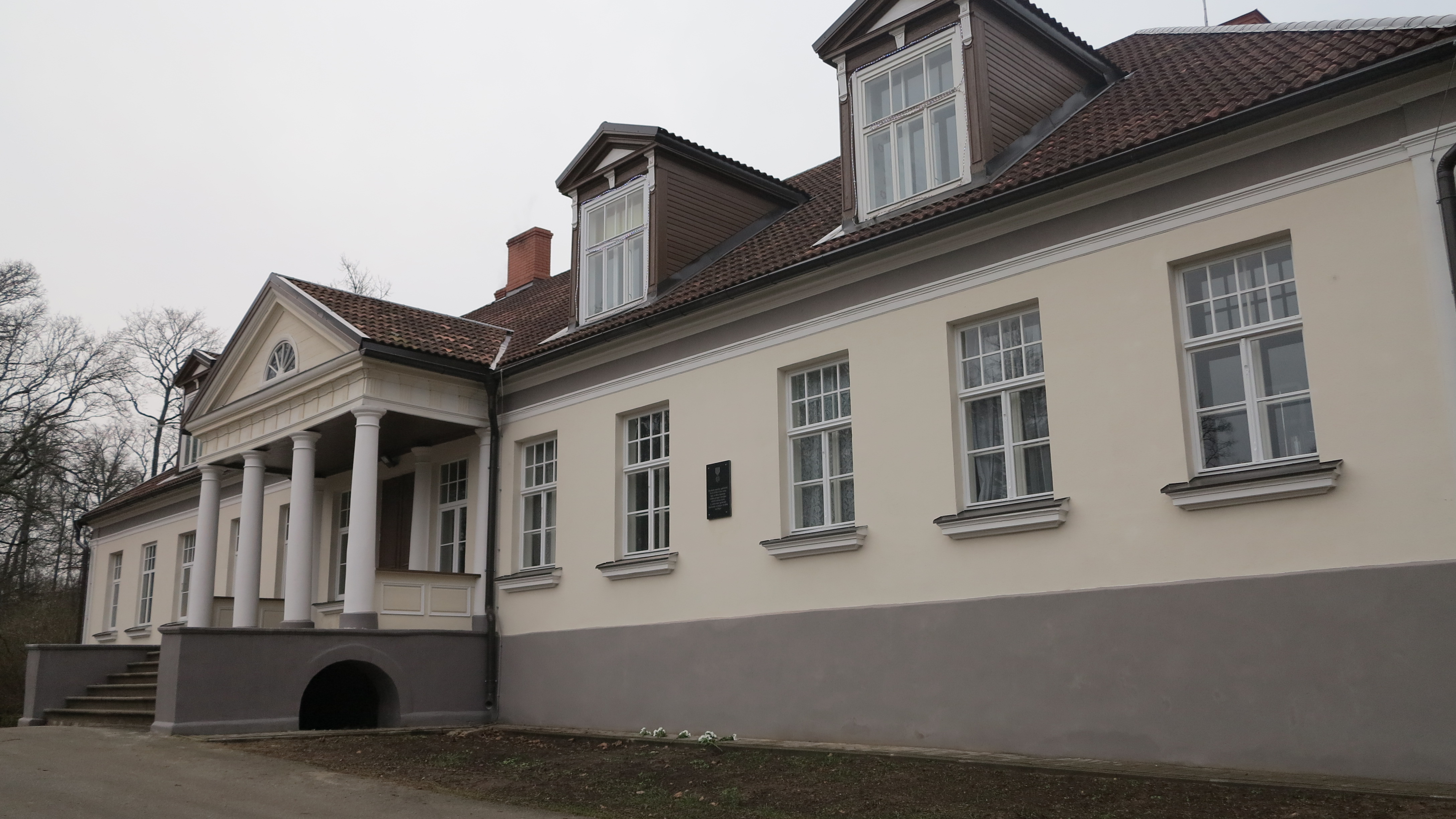
Drabeši Manor main building

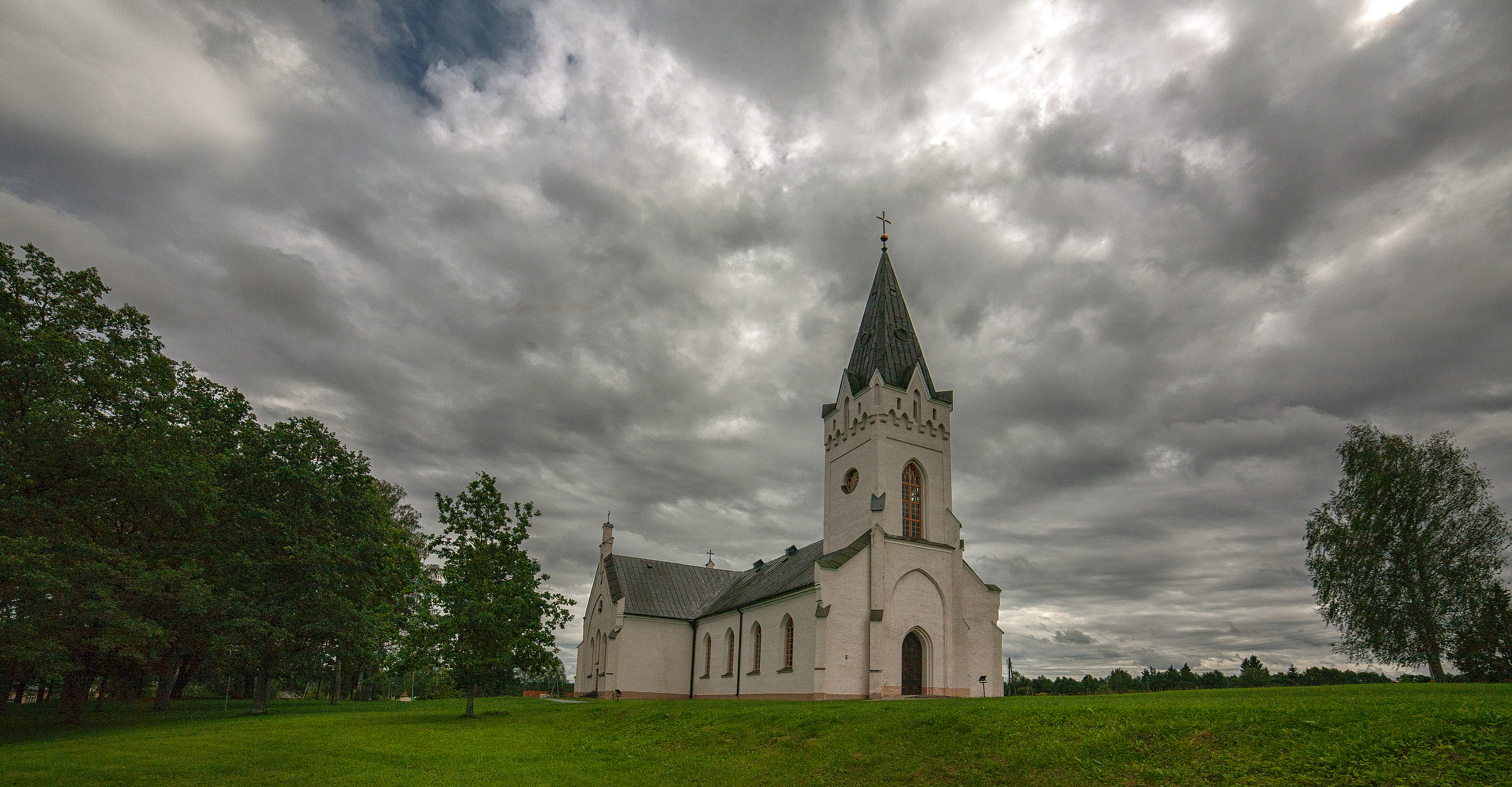
Jaunpiebalga Lutheran Church

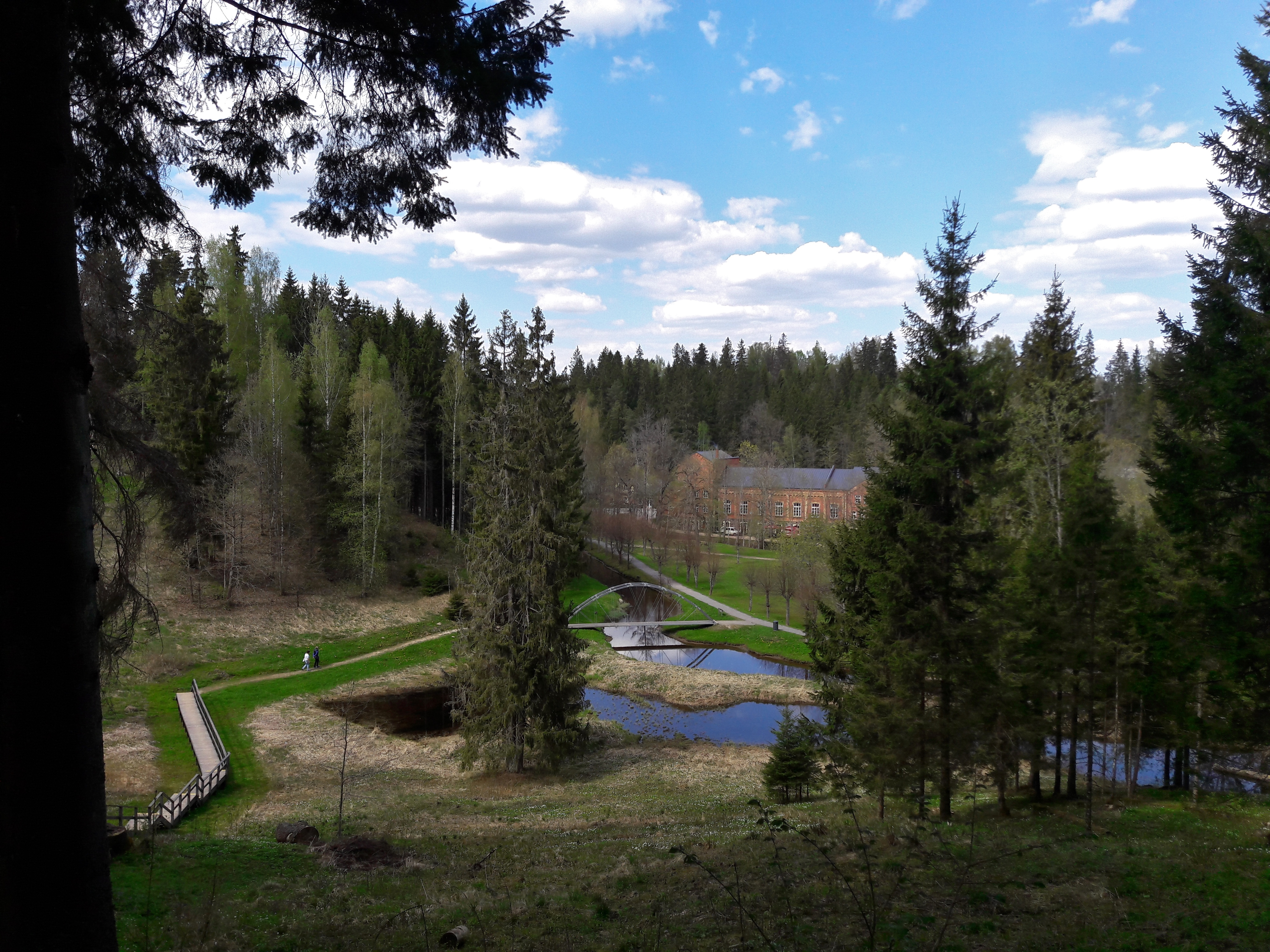
Scenery of Līgatne

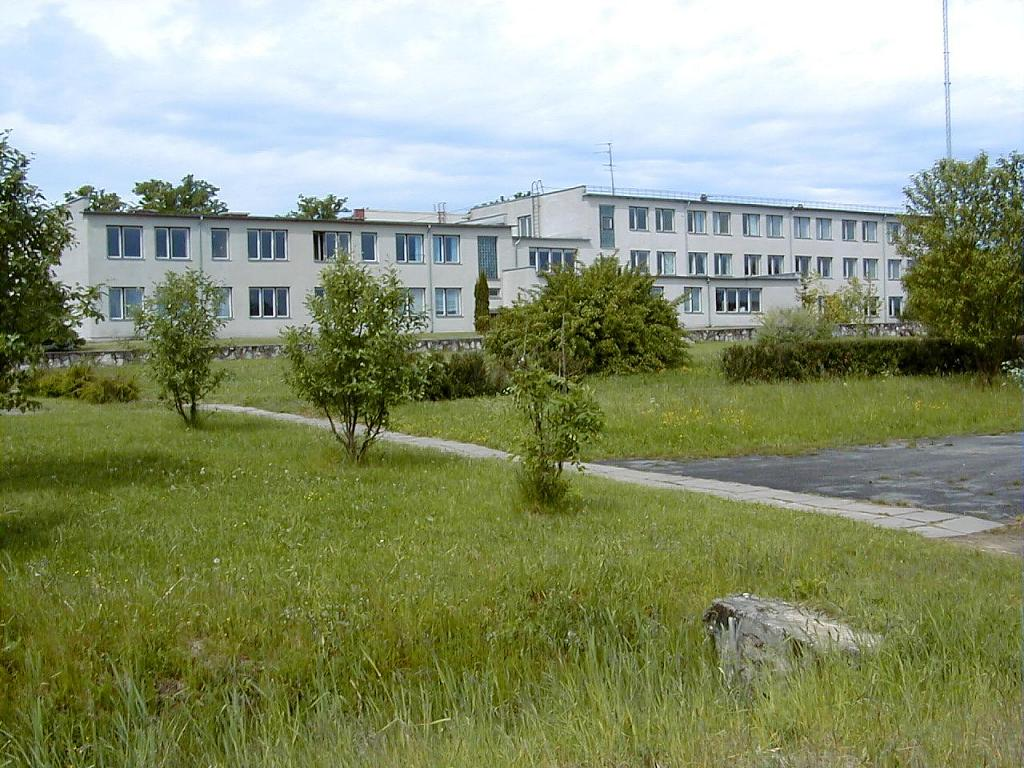
Stalbe Secondary School

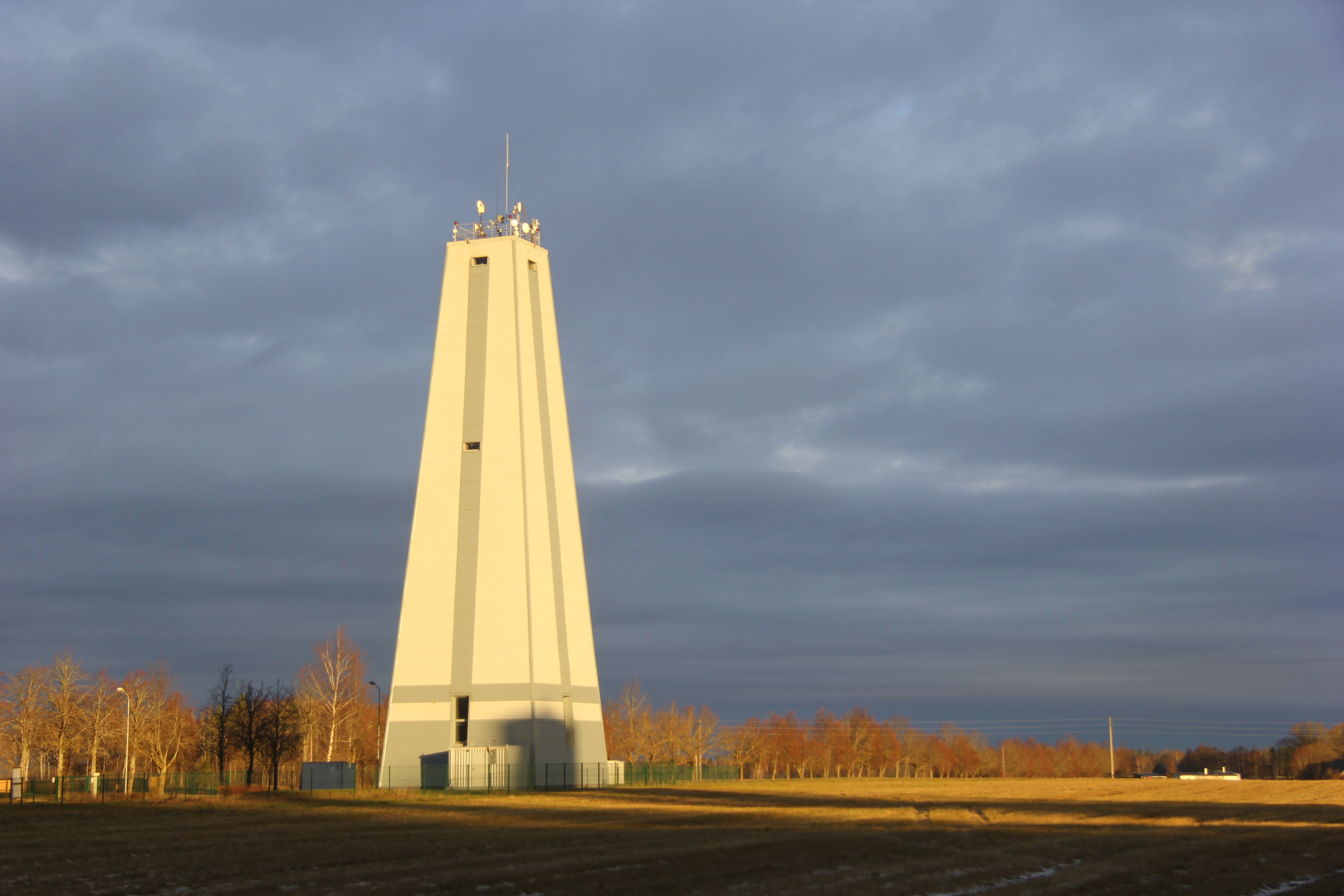
Water tower in Priekuļi

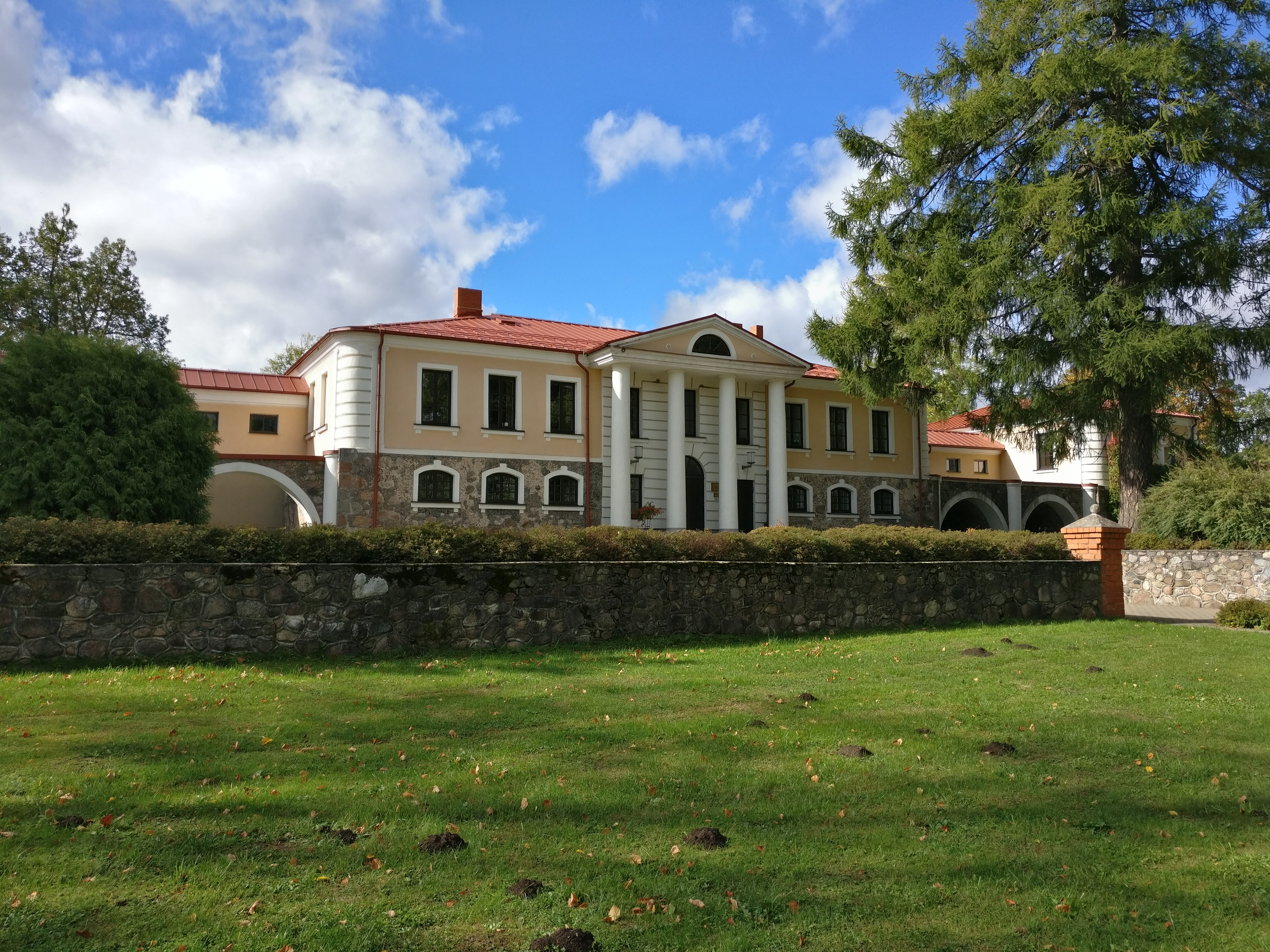
Vecpiebalga Manor

Former coat of arms (2010–2021)

== See also ==
- Administrative divisions of Latvia (2009)
