= Vidzeme (Saeima constituency) =

Constituency of the Saeima, the national legislature of Latvia

- Vidzeme; Vidūmō; Видземе
- Constituency for the Saeima
- Location of Vidzeme within Latvia
- Municipality: List: Jūrmala City; Ādaži; Alūksne; Cēsis; Gulbene; Ķekava; Limbaži; Madona; Mārupe; Ogre; Olaine; Ropaži; Salaspils; Saulkrasti; Sigulda; Smiltene; Valka; Valmiera
- Region: Vidzeme
- Population: 520,588 (2022)
- Electorate: 396,278 (2022)
- Area: 22,942 km^{2} (2023)

Current constituency
- Created: 1922
- Seats: List: 26 (2022–present); 25 (2018–2022); 26 (2014–2018); 27 (2010–2014); 26 (2002–2010); 25 (1995–2002); 26 (1993–1995); 23 (1931–1934); 24 (1928–1931); 23 (1925–1928); 26 (1922–1925)
- Deputies: List: Hosams Abu Meri (JV); Viktorija Baire (JV); Česlavs Batņa (AS); Raimonds Bergmanis (AS); Kaspars Briškens (PRO); Andrejs Ceļapīters (JV); Jānis Dombrava (NA); Raivis Dzintars (NA); Jānis Grasbergs (NA); Glorija Grevcova (S!); Juris Jakovins (ZZS); Armands Krauze (ZZS); Atis Labucis (JV); Ainars Latkovskis (JV); Linda Liepiņa (LPV); Daiga Mieriņa (ZZS); Uģis Mitrevics (NA); Harijs Rokpelnis (ZZS); Jana Simanovska (PRO); Jānis Skrastiņš (JV); Ričards Šlesers (LPV); Edvards Smiltēns (AS); Andrejs Svilāns (AS); Ilze Vergina (JV); Aiva Vīksna (AS); Agita Zariņa-Stūre (JV)

Vidzeme (Latvian: Vidzeme; Livonian: Vidūmō, Russian: Видземе) is one of the five multi-member constituencies of the Saeima, the national legislature of Latvia. The constituency was established in 1922 when the Saeima was established following Latvia's independence. It consists of the city of Jūrmala and municipalities of Ādaži, Alūksne, Cēsis, Gulbene, Ķekava, Limbaži, Madona, Mārupe, Ogre, Olaine, Ropaži, Salaspils, Saulkrasti, Sigulda, Smiltene, Valka and Valmiera in the region of Livonia. The constituency currently elects 26 of the 100 members of the Saeima using the open party-list proportional representation electoral system. At the 2022 parliamentary election it had 396,278 registered electors.

== Electoral system ==
Livonia currently elects 26 of the 100 members of the Saeima using the open party-list proportional representation electoral system. Constituency seats are allocated using the Sainte-Laguë method. Only parties that reach the 5% national threshold compete for constituency seats (4% in 1993).

== Election results ==
=== Summary ===
Election	SKG SKG / LSDSP / ATBILDĪBA / LSDA			Harmony SDPS / SC / TSP / SL			Development/For! AP! / LA			Greens & Farmers ZZS / LZS			New Unity JV / V / JL			Latvia First Latvian Way LPP/LC / LC			Conservatives K / JKP			Russian Union РСЛ / ЗаПЧЕЛ / P			Good Latvia PL / TP			National Alliance NA / TB/LNNK / TB		
Election	Votes	%	Seats	Votes	%	Seats	Votes	%	Seats	Votes	%	Seats	Votes	%	Seats	Votes	%	Seats	Votes	%	Seats	Votes	%	Seats	Votes	%	Seats	Votes	%	Seats
2022				6,237	2.41%	0	19,432	7.51%	0	31,711	12.26%	4	61,485	23.77%	8				9,229	3.57%	0	5,173	2.00%	0				29,861	11.54%	4
2018	506	0.21%	0	26,146	11.00%	3	33,651	14.16%	4	27,448	11.55%	3	16,940	7.13%	2				38,893	16.36%	5	3,061	1.29%	0				31,466	13.24%	4
2014				31,413	12.50%	3	3,104	1.24%	0	54,699	21.77%	6	65,359	26.02%	7				1,680	0.67%	0	1,791	0.71%	0				51,261	20.40%	6
2011	649	0.25%	0	42,772	16.42%	5				31,588	12.13%	3	63,116	24.23%	7	5,216	2.00%	0				990	0.38%	0				45,613	17.51%	5
2010	1,742	0.66%	0	38,873	14.68%	4				58,909	22.24%	6	110,194	41.60%	12							2,347	0.89%	0	16,696	6.30%	2	26,349	9.95%	3
2006	8,448	3.43%	0	15,762	6.40%	2				44,580	18.09%	5	51,189	20.77%	6	18,098	7.34%	2				8,408	3.41%	1	61,769	25.07%	8	19,628	7.97%	2
2002	10,029	3.78%	0							30,957	11.67%	4	73,599	27.75%	8	14,051	5.30%	0				22,889	8.63%	3	57,104	21.53%	6	15,170	5.72%	2
1998	36,098	13.92%	4	12,844	4.95%	1				8,174	3.15%	0				53,288	20.54%	6							65,292	25.17%	7	40,407	15.58%	5
1995	12,572	4.84%	0	6,547	2.52%	1				3,927	1.51%	0				41,530	15.98%	4										32,941	12.67%	4
1993	1,998	0.67%	0	22,985	7.70%	2				35,902	12.03%	3				110,002	36.87%	11				8,068	2.70%	1				16,327	5.47%	2
1931	53,883	24.69%	6							53,256	24.40%	6																		
1928	68,022	32.45%	8							63,011	30.06%	7																		
1925	60,081	33.53%	8							55,640	31.05%	7																		
1922	76,757	39.99%	11							60,491	31.51%	8																		

=== Detailed ===
Party has received at least 5% of the vote nationally and is entitled to compete for constituency seats (4% in 1993).

==== 2020s ====
===== 2022 =====
Results of the 2022 parliamentary election held on 1 October 2022:

Party		Votes	%	Seats
New Unity	JV	61,485	23.77%	8
United List	AS	33,078	12.79%	5
Union of Greens and Farmers	ZZS	31,711	12.26%	4
National Alliance	NA	29,861	11.54%	4
Development/For!	AP	19,432	7.51%	0
The Progressives	PRO	15,591	6.03%	2
Latvia First	LPV	13,473	5.21%	2
The Conservatives	K	9,229	3.57%	0
For Each and Every One	KuK	8,190	3.17%	0
For Stability!	S!	7,978	3.08%	1
Social Democratic Party "Harmony"	SDPS	6,237	2.41%	0
Sovereign Power	SV	5,528	2.14%	0
Latvian Russian Union	РСЛ	5,173	2.00%	0
Republic	R	4,866	1.88%	0
People's Servants for Latvia	TKL	2,758	1.07%	0
Force of People's Power	TVS	2,009	0.78%	0
Union for Latvia	AL	1,205	0.47%	0
United for Latvia	VL	513	0.20%	0
Progressive Christian Party	KPP	393	0.15%	0
Valid votes		258,710	100.00%	26
Rejected votes		3,427	1.31%	
Valid envelopes		262,137	99.83%	
Rejected envelopes		435	0.17%	
Total polled		262,572	66.26%	
Registered electors		396,278		

The following candidates were elected: Hosams Abu Meri (JV), 63,414 votes; Česlavs Batņa (AS), 33,748 votes; Raimonds Bergmanis (AS), 41,201 votes; Kaspars Briškens (PRO), 20,008 votes; Andrejs Ceļapīters (JV), 61,967 votes; Raimonds Čudars (JV), 61,990 votes; Jānis Dombrava (NA), 34,045 votes; Raivis Dzintars (NA), 37,947 votes; Jānis Grasbergs (NA), 31,188 votes; Glorija Grevcova (S!), 10,610 votes; Juris Jakovins (ZZS), 32,845 votes; Krišjānis Kariņš (JV), 94,158 votes; Armands Krauze (ZZS), 35,822 votes; Ainars Latkovskis (JV), 69,100 votes; Linda Liepiņa (LPV), 15,486 votes; Daiga Mieriņa (ZZS), 32,771 votes; Uģis Mitrevics (NA), 36,428 votes; Harijs Rokpelnis (ZZS), 32,757 votes; Evika Siliņa (JV), 63,840 votes; Jana Simanovska (PRO), 16,764 votes; Jānis Skrastiņš (JV), 61,808 votes; Ričards Šlesers (LPV), 16,077 votes; Edvards Smiltēns (AS), 38,554 votes; Māris Sprindžuks (AS), 36,142 votes; Aiva Vīksna (AS), 33,599 votes; and Agita Zariņa-Stūre (JV), 60,947 votes.

==== 2010s ====
===== 2018 =====
Results of the 2018 parliamentary election held on 6 October 2018:

Party		Votes	%	Seats
New Conservative Party	JKP	38,893	16.36%	5
Who Owns the State?	KPV LV	34,341	14.45%	4
Development/For!	AP	33,651	14.16%	4
National Alliance	NA	31,466	13.24%	4
Union of Greens and Farmers	ZZS	27,448	11.55%	3
Social Democratic Party "Harmony"	SDPS	26,146	11.00%	3
New Unity	JV	16,940	7.13%	2
Latvian Association of Regions	LRA	14,458	6.08%	0
The Progressives	PRO	6,239	2.63%	0
Latvian Russian Union	РСЛ	3,061	1.29%	0
For Latvia from the Heart	NSL	1,844	0.78%	0
Latvian Nationalists	LN	1,387	0.58%	0
For an Alternative	PA	787	0.33%	0
SKG Alliance	SKG	506	0.21%	0
Action Party	RP	297	0.12%	0
Latvian Centrist Party	LCP	211	0.09%	0
Valid votes		237,675	100.00%	25
Rejected votes		1,292	0.54%	
Valid envelopes		238,967	99.91%	
Rejected envelopes		207	0.09%	
Total polled		239,174	60.98%	
Registered electors		392,219		

The following candidates were elected: Jānis Ādamsons (SDPS), 30,044 votes; Dagmāra Beitnere-Le Galla (JKP), 41,881 votes; Raimonds Bergmanis (ZZS), 35,225 votes; Aldis Blumbergs (KPV LV), 36,896 votes; Jānis Bordāns (JKP), 58,169 votes; Sergey Dolgopolov (SDPS), 31,863 votes; Jānis Dombrava (NA), 37,245 votes; Raivis Dzintars (NA), 44,654 votes; Inese Ikstena (AP), 34,354 votes; Ieva Krapāne (KPV LV), 36,442 votes; Armands Krauze (ZZS), 28,651 votes; Māris Kučinskis (ZZS), 37,227 votes; Ainars Latkovskis (JV), 19,927 votes; Inese Lībiņa-Egnere (JV), 20,292 votes; Linda Liepiņa (KPV LV), 44,662 votes; Anita Muižniece (JKP), 39,827 votes; Ināra Mūrniece (NA), 39,553 votes; Romāns Naudiņš (NA), 32,226 votes; Artis Pabriks (AP), 46,108 votes; Evija Papule (SDPS), 28,537 votes; Dace Rukšāne-Ščipčinska (AP), 34,080 votes; Andris Skride (AP), 37,355 votes; Karina Sprūde (KPV LV), 36,452 votes; Evita Zālīte-Grosa (JKP), 42,208 votes; and Normunds Žunna (JKP), 39,487 votes.

===== 2014 =====
Results of the 2014 parliamentary election held on 4 October 2014:

Party		Votes	%	Seats
Unity	V	65,359	26.02%	7
Union of Greens and Farmers	ZZS	54,699	21.77%	6
National Alliance	NA	51,261	20.40%	6
Social Democratic Party "Harmony"	SDPS	31,413	12.50%	3
Latvian Association of Regions	LRA	19,069	7.59%	2
For Latvia from the Heart	NSL	18,362	7.31%	2
For Latvia's Development	LA	3,104	1.24%	0
United for Latvia	VL	2,962	1.18%	0
Latvian Russian Union	РСЛ	1,791	0.71%	0
New Conservative Party	JKP	1,680	0.67%	0
Izaugsme		693	0.28%	0
Freedom. Free from Fear, Hate and Anger		567	0.23%	0
Sovereignty		260	0.10%	0
Valid votes		251,220	100.00%	26
Rejected votes		1,590	0.63%	
Valid envelopes		252,810	99.90%	
Rejected envelopes		245	0.10%	
Total polled		253,055	62.97%	
Registered electors		401,864		

The following candidates were elected: Jānis Ādamsons (SDPS), 35,892 votes; Inesis Boķis (V), 69,489 votes; Mārtiņš Bondars (LRA), 28,309 votes; Sergey Dolgopolov (SDPS), 39,399 votes; Jānis Dombrava (NA), 60,161 votes; Jānis Dūklavs (ZZS), 70,369 vots; Raivis Dzintars (NA), 75,742 votes; Vilnis Ķirsis (V), 65,544 votes; Rihards Kols (NA), 52,749 votes; Armands Krauze (ZZS), 56,360 votes; Kārlis Krēsliņš (NA), 53,297 votes; Gunārs Kūtris (NSL), 24,651 votes; Ainars Latkovskis (V), 71,873 votes; Ingmārs Līdaka (ZZS), 64,928 votes; Ainārs Mežulis (ZZS), 54,571 votes; Ināra Mūrniece (NA), 56,130 votes; Romāns Naudiņš (NA), 54,980 votes; Arvīds Platpers (NSL), 19,626 votes; Artis Rasmanis (ZZS), 55,077 votes; Romualds Ražuks (V), 65,393 votes; Jānis Ruks (LRA), 18,392 votes; Kārlis Šadurskis (V), 67,135 votes; Andris Siliņš (ZZS), 55,624 votes; Laimdota Straujuma (V), 83,124 votes; Jānis Upenieks (V), 67,205 votes; and Ivars Zariņš (SDPS), 34,113 votes.

===== 2011 =====
Results of the 2011 parliamentary election held on 17 September 2011:

Party		Votes	%	Seats
Zatlers' Reform Party	ZRP	67,051	25.74%	7
Unity	V	63,116	24.23%	7
National Alliance	NA	45,613	17.51%	5
Harmony Centre	SC	42,772	16.42%	5
Union of Greens and Farmers	ZZS	31,588	12.13%	3
Latvia's First Party/Latvian Way	LPP/LC	5,216	2.00%	0
Last Party	PP	1,473	0.57%	0
For Human Rights in a United Latvia	ЗаПЧЕЛ	990	0.38%	0
For a Presidential Republic	PPR	788	0.30%	0
People's Control	TK	757	0.29%	0
Latvian Social Democratic Workers' Party	LSDSP	649	0.25%	0
Christian Democratic Union	KDS	493	0.19%	0
Freedom. Free from Fear, Hate and Anger		0	0.00%	0
Valid votes		260,506	100.00%	27
Rejected votes		2,339	0.89%	
Valid envelopes		262,845	99.88%	
Rejected envelopes		306	0.12%	
Total polled		263,151	64.33%	
Registered electors		409,085		

The following candidates were elected: Dzintars Ābiķis (V), 63,734 votes; Jānis Ādamsons (SC), 50,578 votes; Guntars Bilsēns (ZRP), 69,486 votes; Ilma Čepāne (V), 77,215 votes; Sergey Dolgopolov (SC), 54,957 votes; Jānis Dombrava (NA), 53,776 votes; Valdis Dombrovskis (V), 107,581 votes; Ina Druviete (V), 67,484 votes; Jānis Dūklavs (ZRP), 39,893 votes; Raivis Dzintars (NA), 72,036 votes; Iveta Grigule (ZZS), 33,330 votes; Viktors Jakovļevs (SC), 45,622 votes; Zanda Kalniņa-Lukaševica (ZRP), 69,844 votes; Ivans Klementjevs (SC), 50,015 votes; Kārlis Krēsliņš (NA), 47,861 votes; Ainars Latkovskis (V), 69,625 votes; Ingmārs Līdaka (ZZS), 38,885 votes; Ināra Mūrniece (NA), 49,079 votes; Romāns Naudiņš (NA), 47,921 votes; Artis Pabriks (V), 77,999 votes; Romualds Ražuks (ZRP), 71,744 votes; Gunārs Rusiņš (ZRP), 70,874 votes; Aleksandrs Sakovskis (SC), 45,246 votes; Elīna Siliņa (ZRP), 70,032 votes; Edvards Smiltēns (V), 63,728 votes; Jānis Upenieks (ZRP), 69,669 votes; and Valdis Zatlers (ZRP), 103,139 votes.

===== 2010 =====
Results of the 2010 parliamentary election held on 2 October 2010:

Party		Votes	%	Seats
Unity	V	110,194	41.60%	12
Union of Greens and Farmers	ZZS	58,909	22.24%	6
Harmony Centre	SC	38,873	14.68%	4
National Alliance	NA	26,349	9.95%	3
For a Good Latvia	PL	16,696	6.30%	2
Made in Latvia	RL	2,609	0.99%	0
Last Party	PP	2,603	0.98%	0
For Human Rights in a United Latvia	ЗаПЧЕЛ	2,347	0.89%	0
For a Presidential Republic	PPR	2,171	0.82%	0
Responsibility – Social Democratic Alliance of Political Parties	ATBILDĪBA	1,742	0.66%	0
People's Control	TK	1,097	0.41%	0
Christian Democratic Union	KDS	830	0.31%	0
Daugava – For Latvia	ZRP	443	0.17%	0
Valid votes		264,863	100.00%	27
Rejected votes		6,366	2.35%	
Valid envelopes		271,229	99.88%	
Rejected envelopes		328	0.12%	
Total polled		271,557	66.72%	
Registered electors		407,001		

The following candidates were elected: Dzintars Ābiķis (V), 109,241 votes; Jānis Ādamsons (SC), 45,059 votes; Arvils Ašeradens (V), 108,101 votes; Andris Bērziņš (ZZS), 58,339 votes; Ingmārs Čaklais (V), 106,899 votes; Ilma Čepāne (V), 129,137 votes; Jānis Dombrava (NA), 27,073 votes; Valdis Dombrovskis (V), 186,035 votes; Ina Druviete (V), 114,118 votes; Jānis Dūklavs (ZZS), 70,037 votes; Raivis Dzintars (NA), 41,653 votes; Guntars Galvanovskis (V), 107,578 votes; Iveta Grigule (ZZS), 59,639 votes; Dzintra Hirša (V), 107,293 votes; Ivans Klementjevs (SC), 46,549 votes; Armands Krauze (ZZS), 57,903 votes; Māris Kučinskis (PL), 17,660 votes; Visvaldis Lācis (NA), 30,432 votes; Ainars Latkovskis (V), 115,054 votes; Ingmārs Līdaka (ZZS), 72,858 votes; Artis Pabriks (V), 133,131 votes; Aleksandrs Sakovskis (SC), 40,750 votes; Juris Silovs (SC), 41,035 votes; Edvards Smiltēns (V), 109,389 votes; Vitauts Staņa (ZZS), 57,845 votes; Guntis Ulmanis (PL), 17,835 votes; and Andris Vilks (V), 110,669 votes.

==== 2000s ====
===== 2006 =====
Results of the 2006 parliamentary election held on 7 October 2006:

Party		Votes per district										Total Votes	%	Seats
Party		Alūks- ne	Cēsis	Gul- bene	Jūr- mala City	Lim- baži	Madona	Ogre	Riga	Valka	Val- miera	Total Votes	%	Seats
People's Party	TP	3,124	7,931	3,193	3,411	4,723	5,663	6,247	14,099	4,918	8,460	61,769	25.07%	8
New Era Party	JL	2,041	5,551	1,544	4,015	3,934	4,761	6,579	15,052	2,664	5,048	51,189	20.77%	6
Union of Greens and Farmers	ZZS	2,372	5,749	2,731	2,601	3,970	3,874	5,158	10,033	3,004	5,088	44,580	18.09%	5
For Fatherland and Freedom/LNNK	TB/LNNK	638	1,875	722	1,963	1,290	1,330	2,349	6,253	953	2,255	19,628	7.97%	2
Latvia's First Party/Latvian Way	LPP/LC	697	1,626	853	1,646	1,245	938	2,469	6,113	875	1,636	18,098	7.34%	2
Harmony Centre	SC	338	609	321	3,679	346	449	1,734	7,163	448	675	15,762	6.40%	2
Latvian Social Democratic Workers' Party	LSDSP	542	812	472	654	644	862	870	1,987	563	1,042	8,448	3.43%	0
For Human Rights in a United Latvia	ЗаПЧЕЛ	196	395	249	2,138	169	292	832	3,358	276	503	8,408	3.41%	1
All for Latvia!		218	570	205	350	337	452	612	1,512	273	510	5,039	2.05%	0
New Democrats	NJD	176	461	140	181	309	232	413	1,178	296	391	3,777	1.53%	0
Motherland		39	100	40	575	65	49	332	1,705	40	153	3,098	1.26%	0
Pensioners and Seniors Party	PSP	102	309	110	149	139	181	451	617	79	190	2,327	0.94%	0
Māra's Land		82	131	56	135	64	121	152	384	60	163	1,348	0.55%	0
Eurosceptics		58	103	22	94	53	94	97	337	43	80	981	0.40%	0
Our Land Party		28	29	18	235	36	44	62	136	22	38	648	0.26%	0
Social Fairness Party	STP	19	30	34	32	10	57	60	110	16	36	404	0.16%	0
Fatherland Union	TS	19	16	9	30	43	25	31	100	9	42	324	0.13%	0
National Power Union	NSS	15	20	9	35	20	15	43	81	17	38	293	0.12%	0
Latvian's Latvia National Political Defence Organisation		13	29	7	19	10	24	55	96	9	20	282	0.11%	0
Valid votes		10,717	26,346	10,735	21,942	17,407	19,463	28,546	70,314	14,565	26,368	246,403	100.00%	26
Rejected votes												1,352	0.55%	
Valid envelopes												247,755	99.85%	
Rejected envelopes												377	0.15%	
Total polled												248,132	64.22%	
Registered electors												386,385		

The following candidates were elected: Andris Bērziņš (LPP/LC), 19,712 votes; Gundars Bērziņš (TP), 67,621 votes; Helēna Demakova (TP), 69,567 votes; Oļegs Deņisovs (SC), 16,851 votes; Ina Druviete (JL), 61,858 votes; Indulis Emsis (ZZS), 48,012 votes; Ivars Godmanis (LPP/LC), 19,904 votes; Sandra Kalniete (JL), 71,307 votes; Imants Kalniņš (TB/LNNK), 21,165 votes; Aigars Kalvītis (TP), 85,637 votes; Ausma Kantāne-Ziedone (JL), 52,164 votes; Arturs Krišjānis Kariņš (JL), 60,571 votes; Ivans Klementjevs (SC), 16,914 votes; Vents Armands Krauklis (TP), 66,069 votes; Māris Kučinskis (TP), 66,092 votes; Visvaldis Lācis (ZZS), 46,857 votes; Ainars Latkovskis (JL), 55,184 votes; Ingmārs Līdaka (ZZS), 51,070 votes; Artis Pabriks (TP), 71,744 votes; Raimonds Pauls (TP), 68,045 votes; Einars Repše (JL), 56,940 votes; Mārtiņš Roze (ZZS), 49,872 votes; Anna Seile (TB/LNNK), 22,390 votes; Juris Sokolovskis (ЗаПЧЕЛ), 9,202 votes; Aigars Štokenbergs (TP), 66,206 votes; and Raimonds Vējonis (ZZS), 46,922 votes.

===== 2002 =====
Results of the 2002 parliamentary election held on 5 October 2002:

Party		Votes per district										Total Votes	%	Seats
Party		Alūks- ne	Cēsis	Gul- bene	Jūr- mala City	Lim- baži	Madona	Ogre	Riga	Valka	Val- miera	Total Votes	%	Seats
New Era Party	JL	2,923	8,743	2,082	6,511	6,349	5,285	9,465	21,811	3,516	6,914	73,599	27.75%	8
People's Party	TP	3,188	7,200	3,381	2,952	5,046	5,098	5,733	11,271	5,028	8,207	57,104	21.53%	6
Union of Greens and Farmers	ZZS	1,866	4,891	2,228	1,261	2,175	3,846	3,052	5,265	2,403	3,969	30,956	11.67%	4
Latvia's First Party	LPP	1,174	2,907	1,365	2,081	1,996	2,435	3,788	7,049	1,699	3,386	27,880	10.51%	3
For Human Rights in a United Latvia	ЗаПЧЕЛ	849	1,066	738	5,165	597	857	2,845	8,934	675	1,163	22,889	8.63%	3
For Fatherland and Freedom/LNNK	TB/LNNK	694	1,647	795	1,360	1,106	1,400	1,742	3,652	933	1,841	15,170	5.72%	2
Latvian Way	LC	1,252	1,611	856	779	1,205	1,406	1,845	2,768	975	1,355	14,052	5.30%	0
Latvian Social Democratic Workers' Party	LSDSP	521	945	688	715	712	1,508	1,071	2,107	469	1,293	10,029	3.78%	0
Social Democratic Union	SDS	307	514	415	245	305	546	442	888	267	685	4,614	1.74%	0
Social Democratic Welfare Party	SDLP	87	123	68	451	58	85	252	902	51	147	2,224	0.84%	0
Political Alliance "Centre"		90	210	138	82	111	128	83	196	137	339	1,514	0.57%	0
Latvians' Party	LP	72	135	38	102	95	96	125	356	43	119	1,181	0.45%	0
Russian Party		139	39	41	142	25	66	92	202	30	61	837	0.32%	0
Latvian Revival Party	LAP	45	87	39	31	98	134	70	205	40	73	822	0.31%	0
Māra's Land		25	31	12	85	16	41	42	173	25	44	494	0.19%	0
Freedom Party	BP	40	35	31	53	28	68	51	111	17	28	462	0.17%	0
Citizens' Union "Our Land"		65	54	19	88	20	30	37	102	16	27	458	0.17%	0
Progressive Centre Party	PCP	18	91	47	36	11	23	29	73	50	33	411	0.15%	0
Light of Latgale	LG	32	19	26	27	10	53	41	89	11	20	328	0.12%	0
Latvian United Republican Party	LARP	12	23	9	22	11	9	16	58	28	28	216	0.08%	0
Valid votes		13,399	30,371	13,016	22,188	19,974	23,114	30,821	66,212	16,413	29,732	265,240	100.00%	26
Rejected votes												1,069	0.40%	
Valid envelopes												266,309	99.78%	
Rejected envelopes												592	0.22%	
Total polled												266,901	74.64%	
Registered electors												357,566		

The following candidates were elected: Andris Ārgalis (TP), 67,559 votes; Vilnis Edvīns Bresis (ZZS), 34,709 votes; Juris Dalbiņš (TP), 63,030 votes; Oļegs Deņisovs (ЗаПЧЕЛ), 25,013 votes; Indulis Emsis (ZZS), 34,000 votes; Ēriks Jēkabsons (LPP), 36,815 votes; Ausma Kantāne-Ziedone (JL), 79,137 votes; Andis Kāposts (ZZS), 33,988 votes; Oskars Kastēns (LPP), 34,041 votes; Arturs Krišjānis Kariņš (JL), 76,380 votes; Uldis Mārtiņš Klauss (JL), 75,190 votes; Ģirts Valdis Kristovskis (TB/LNNK), 18,823 votes; Alberts Krūmiņš (JL), 75,163 votes; Arnolds Laksa (LPP), 31,036 votes; Ainars Latkovskis (JL), 76,012 votes; Liene Liepiņa (JL), 74,811 votes; Pēteris Ontužāns (JL), 75,883 votes; Raimonds Pauls (TP), 65,661 votes; Mareks Segliņš (TP), 63,658 votes; Viesturs Šiliņš (JL), 74,788 votes; Andris Šķēle (TP), 82,070 votes; Atis Slakteris (TP), 63,833 votes; Igors Solovjovs (ЗаПЧЕЛ), 24,452 votes; Jānis Straume (TB/LNNK), 18,201 votes; Andris Tolmačovs (ЗаПЧЕЛ), 24,634 votes; and Ingrīda Ūdre (ZZS), 37,039 votes.

==== 1990s ====
===== 1998 =====
Results of the 1998 parliamentary election held on 3 October 1998:

Party		Votes per district										Total Votes	%	Seats
Party		Alūks- ne	Cēsis	Gul- bene	Jūr- mala City	Lim- baži	Madona	Ogre	Riga	Valka	Val- miera	Total Votes	%	Seats
People's Party	TP	2,839	7,195	2,461	4,997	5,715	4,770	7,832	15,488	4,993	9,002	65,292	25.17%	7
Latvian Way	LC	3,931	6,984	3,524	2,697	5,015	5,321	5,325	10,193	4,251	6,047	53,288	20.54%	6
For Fatherland and Freedom/LNNK	TB/LNNK	1,342	4,540	1,729	4,289	3,048	3,484	5,107	10,915	1,740	4,213	40,407	15.58%	5
Latvian Social Democratic Alliance	LSDA	1,395	3,617	1,892	2,387	2,699	4,514	4,384	8,244	1,768	5,198	36,098	13.92%	4
New Party	JP	1,528	2,439	1,583	1,408	1,617	2,100	2,188	4,484	1,223	1,944	20,514	7.91%	2
National Harmony Party	TSP	563	443	545	3,105	255	451	1,500	5,160	353	469	12,844	4.95%	1
Latvian Farmers' Union	LZS	538	1,859	500	248	517	662	694	1,068	883	1,205	8,174	3.15%	0
Workers' Party, Christian Democratic Union and Latvian Green Party	DP–KDS–LZP	551	880	286	413	518	684	781	1,417	396	826	6,752	2.60%	0
People's Movement for Latvia	TKL	271	600	365	149	354	553	381	524	338	386	3,921	1.51%	0
Democratic Party "Saimnieks"		310	222	189	244	169	315	339	489	281	348	2,906	1.12%	0
Latvian Unity Party	LVP	199	225	123	27	103	183	110	421	73	75	1,539	0.59%	0
Latvian Revival Party	LAP	66	216	121	78	116	138	120	391	90	118	1,454	0.56%	0
Social Democratic Women's Organisation	SDSO	57	111	68	67	82	126	119	237	76	75	1,018	0.39%	0
National Progress Party	NPP	29	24	54	239	42	18	92	466	25	15	1,004	0.39%	0
Māra's Land	MZ	45	133	31	96	87	100	87	322	42	23	966	0.37%	0
Popular Movement "Freedom"		79	90	52	121	53	102	75	221	61	63	917	0.35%	0
Latvian National Democratic Party	LNDP	64	128	39	62	53	101	108	210	33	97	895	0.35%	0
Helsinki-86		25	55	23	73	40	42	58	149	30	74	569	0.22%	0
Conservative Party	KP	17	85	35	50	33	39	74	138	6	33	510	0.20%	0
Democrats' Party	DP	20	17	16	19	8	31	29	49	12	29	230	0.09%	0
Latvian National Reform Party	LNRP	8	14	5	5	2	7	11	30	4	11	97	0.04%	0
Valid votes		13,877	29,877	13,641	20,774	20,526	23,741	29,414	60,616	16,678	30,251	259,395	100.00%	25
Rejected votes		103	141	102	94	72	96	136	271	40	127	1,182	0.45%	
Valid envelopes		13,980	30,018	13,743	20,868	20,598	23,837	29,550	60,887	16,718	30,378	260,577	99.71%	
Rejected envelopes												756	0.29%	
Total polled												261,333	76.55%	
Registered electors												341,394		

The following candidates were elected: Dzintars Ābiķis (TP), 71,415 votes; Jānis Ādamsons (LSDA), 47,040 votes; Gundars Bērziņš (TP), 72,163 votes; Valdis Birkavs (LC), 58,478 votes; Gundars Bojārs (LSDA), 45,367 votes; Juris Dalbiņš (TP), 75,830 votes; Ivars Godmanis (LC), 59,680 votes; Anatolijs Gorbunovs (LC), 73,964 votes; Kārlis Greiškalns (TP), 70,259 votes; Oskars Grīgs (TB/LNNK), 43,696 votes; Arnis Kalniņš (LSDA), 37,760 votes; Imants Kalniņš (TB/LNNK), 45,557 votes; Vilis Krištopans (LC), 71,043 votes; Jānis Lagzdiņš (TP), 73,487 votes; Viola Lāzo (LSDA), 37,993 votes; Kristiāna Lībane (LC), 59,626 votes; Vladimirs Makarovs (TB/LNNK), 44,174 votes; Vaira Paegle (TP), 70,303 votes; Andrejs Panteļējevs (LC), 61,591 votes; Raimonds Pauls (JP), 28,935 votes; Aida Prēdele (TB/LNNK), 43,140 votes; Anna Seile (TB/LNNK), 45,421 votes; Andris Šķēle (TP), 96,267 votes; Ainārs Šlesers (JP), 23,008 votes; and Igors Solovjovs (TSP), 14,018 votes.

===== 1995 =====
Results of the 1995 parliamentary election held on 30 September and 1 October 1995:

Party		Votes	%	Seats
Democratic Party "Saimnieks"	DPS	43,624	16.78%	5
Latvian Way	LC	41,530	15.98%	4
People's Movement for Latvia	TKL	41,355	15.91%	4
For Fatherland and Freedom	TB	32,941	12.67%	4
Latvian Unity Party	LVP	24,337	9.36%	3
Latvian National Conservative Party and Latvian Green Party	LNNK-LZP	16,924	6.51%	2
Latvian Farmers' Union, Christian Democratic Union and Latgalian Labour Party	LZS-KDS-LDP	14,534	5.59%	2
Labour and Justice Coalition: LDDP, LSDSP and LACAP	LDDP-LSDSP-LACAP	12,572	4.84%	0
Political Union of Economists	TPA	7,051	2.71%	0
National Harmony Party	TSP	6,547	2.52%	1
Socialist Party of Latvia	LSP	4,044	1.56%	0
Latvian Farmers' Union	LZS	3,927	1.51%	0
Popular Front of Latvia	LTF	3,155	1.21%	0
Political Association of the Underprivileged and Latvian Independence Party		2,796	1.08%	0
Party of Russian Citizens in Latvia	ПргЛ	1,720	0.66%	0
Citizens Union "Our Land" – Anti-Communist Union		1,469	0.57%	0
Democrats' Party	DP	562	0.22%	0
Latvian Liberal Party	LLP	477	0.18%	0
Latvian National Democratic Party	LNDP	346	0.13%	0
Valid votes		259,911	100.00%	25

The following candidates were elected: Jānis Ādamsons (LC), 58,506 votes; Andris Ameriks (TSP), 7,045 votes; Raitis Apalups (LVP), 26,370 votes; Valdis Birkavs (LC), 42,968 votes; Ilmārs Bišers (DPS), 48,353 votes; Alfrēds Čepānis (DPS), 54,885 votes; Ziedonis Čevers (DPS), 54,778 votes; Roberts Dilba (LVP), 26,335 votes; Oļģerts Dunkers (TKL), 44,082 votes; Indulis Emsis (LNNK-LZP), 18,442 votes; Māris Gailis (LC), 52,718 votes; Anatolijs Gorbunovs (LC), 60,762 votes; Viesturs Gredzens (LVP), 27,735 votes; Oskars Grīgs (TB), 36,060 votes; Ojārs Grīnbergs (TKL), 45,364 votes; Guntars Grīnblats (TB), 34,386 votes; Odisejs Kostanda (TKL), 50,569 votes; Aivars Kreituss (DPS), 53,372 votes; Aida Prēdele (LZS-KDS-LDP), 15,666 votes; Pauls Putniņš (LZS-KDS-LDP), 15,864 votes; Andris Saulītis (TKL), 44,456 votes; Anna Seile (LNNK-LZP), 20,923 votes; Jānis Straume (TB), 34,468 votes; Dainis Turlais (DPS), 51,126 votes; and Juris Galerijs Vidiņš (TB), 35,527 votes.

===== 1993 =====
Results of the 1993 parliamentary election held on 5 and 6 June 1993:

Party		Votes per district										Total Votes	%	Seats
Party		Alūks- ne	Cēsis	Gul- bene	Jūr- mala City	Lim- baži	Madona	Ogre	Riga	Valka	Val- miera	Total Votes	%	Seats
Latvian Way	LC	7,614	13,587	7,491	5,497	10,059	10,463	11,553	21,413	8,890	13,435	110,002	36.87%	11
Latvian National Independence Movement	LNNK	1,066	3,505	1,757	4,794	2,894	2,077	5,374	10,434	1,232	3,810	36,943	12.38%	4
Latvian Farmers' Union	LZS	3,004	4,141	2,113	1,606	3,533	4,032	3,863	6,114	2,946	4,550	35,902	12.03%	3
Harmony for Latvia	SL	907	3,240	1,117	2,765	1,976	2,777	2,601	5,397	801	1,404	22,985	7.70%	2
Democratic Center Party of Latvia	DCP	759	1,874	915	1,173	1,170	1,040	2,014	5,068	1,008	2,548	17,569	5.89%	2
For Fatherland and Freedom	TB	611	2,017	663	1,480	973	1,581	1,635	4,465	961	1,941	16,327	5.47%	2
Christian Democratic Union	KDS	387	1,777	615	1,423	746	1,376	1,809	3,989	617	1,398	14,137	4.74%	1
Popular Front of Latvia	LTF	500	1,288	416	594	637	667	884	1,592	682	1,028	8,288	2.78%	0
Equal Rights	Р	671	663	901	1,037	397	752	696	2,059	350	542	8,068	2.70%	1
Citizens Union "Our Land"		108	336	125	517	126	1,627	272	664	121	229	4,125	1.38%	0
Green List		119	499	199	308	316	330	378	1,226	284	443	4,102	1.37%	0
Latvia's Happiness		181	439	186	234	288	424	376	735	273	508	3,644	1.22%	0
Economic Activity League		131	497	140	354	305	226	348	1,084	218	329	3,632	1.22%	0
Democratic Labour Party of Latvia	LDDP	101	259	186	225	292	510	321	692	239	528	3,353	1.12%	0
Latvian Social Democratic Workers' Party	LSDSP	91	387	96	170	124	222	189	385	114	220	1,998	0.67%	0
Anti-Communist Union		99	221	141	104	110	183	152	372	99	194	1,675	0.56%	0
Russian National Democratic List		99	70	51	339	20	62	143	580	46	75	1,485	0.50%	0
Republican Platform		88	153	153	69	106	116	134	274	118	187	1,398	0.47%	0
Conservatives and Peasants		68	98	58	129	229	78	108	286	51	97	1,202	0.40%	0
Independents' Union		19	80	27	47	37	42	41	118	13	85	509	0.17%	0
Latvian Liberal Party	LLP	30	49	31	36	47	54	39	112	32	55	485	0.16%	0
Liberal Alliance		16	26	24	34	10	24	21	105	11	9	280	0.09%	0
Latvian Unity Party	LVP	13	23	14	20	14	24	22	73	19	15	237	0.08%	0
Valid votes		16,682	35,229	17,419	22,955	24,409	28,687	32,973	67,237	19,125	33,630	298,346	100.00%	26
Rejected votes		45	761	128	195	100	438	154	633	307	462	3,223	1.07%	
Valid envelopes		16,727	35,990	17,547	23,150	24,509	29,125	33,127	67,870	19,432	34,092	301,569		

The following candidates were elected: Dzintars Ābiķis (LC), 107,742 votes; Georgs Andrejevs (LC), 144,682 votes; Aivars Berķis (LZS), 43,451 votes; Valdis Birkavs (LC), 114,417 votes; Inese Birzniece (LC), 108,908 votes; Olga Dreģe (DCP), 18,868 votes; Anatolijs Gorbunovs (LC), 172,762 votes; Edvīns Inkēns (LC), 121,494 votes; Imants Kalniņš (LNNK), 38,912 votes; Ojārs Kehris (LC), 110,940 votes; Edvīns Kide (SL), 23,899 votes; Aivars Kreituss (DCP), 27,096 votes; Ģirts Valdis Kristovskis (LC), 108,641 votes; Jānis Lucāns (SL), 25,955 votes; Gunārs Meierovics (LC), 119,154 votes; Valdis Pavlovskis (LC), 110,671 votes; Aleksandrs Pētersons (TB), 17,388 votes; Velta Puriņa (LNNK), 40,305 votes; Irina Rajuškina (Р), 7,439 votes; Gunārs Resnais (LZS), 37,013 votes; Andris Saulītis (KDS), 15,295 votes; Anna Seile (LNNK), 37,163 votes; Jānis Straume (TB), 17,814 votes; Guntis Ulmanis (LZS), 41,068 votes; Mārtiņš Virsis (LC), 106,488 votes; and Alfrēds Žīgurs (LNNK), 45,231 votes.

==== 1930s ====
===== 1931 =====
Results of the 1931 parliamentary election held on 3 and 4 October 1931:

Party		Votes per County					Total Votes	%	Seats
Party		Cēsis	Madona	Riga	Valka	Val- miera	Total Votes	%	Seats
Latvian Social Democratic Workers' Party	LSDSP	6,438	9,725	12,505	9,999	15,216	53,883	24.69%	6
Latvian Farmers' Union	LZS	8,411	11,309	10,451	11,148	11,937	53,256	24.40%	6
Latvian New Farmers and Small Landowners Party	LJSP	3,439	2,992	7,293	4,801	3,781	22,306	10.22%	2
Democratic Centre	DC	2,313	1,825	6,364	2,157	2,143	14,802	6.78%	1
New Farmers' Association	JZA	3,518	3,008	4,655	1,424	1,358	13,963	6.40%	1
Party of Former Money Depositors	ANNTT	1,028	1,552	2,185	1,404	2,101	8,270	3.79%	1
Leftist Workers and Farm Labourers	KSDZ	920	544	2,458	1,229	2,701	7,852	3.60%	1
German-Baltic Party in Latvia	DbPL	354	879	4,558	236	415	6,442	2.95%	1
Latvian Labour Union	LDS	628	348	4,306	479	654	6,415	2.94%	1
Riga German List for Vidzeme	DbRP	8	19	6,074	15	22	6,138	2.81%	1
Progressive Association	PA	680	1,559	1,880	929	796	5,844	2.68%	1
Christian Union and Workers	KAS	705	483	1,378	820	2,153	5,539	2.54%	1
Union for Peace, Order and Production	MKRA	201	296	1,791	774	991	4,053	1.86%	0
National Union	NA	782	597	802	695	782	3,658	1.68%	0
Women's Organisations		408	365	755	456	387	2,371	1.09%	0
Unsatisfied New Farmers, Small Landholders and Fishermen		256	173	576	373	394	1,772	0.81%	0
Christian Peasants and Catholics	KZK	179	240	431	97	84	1,031	0.47%	0
Latvian Social Democratic Opposition Workers		38	147	101	129	70	485	0.22%	0
Latvian Polish Union Polish-Catholics	ZPL	13	22	104	16	9	164	0.08%	0
Valid votes		30,319	36,083	68,667	37,181	45,994	218,244	100.00%	23
Rejected votes							1,146	0.52%	
Valid envelopes							219,390	99.98%	
Rejected envelopes							51	0.02%	
Total polled							219,441		

==== 1920s ====
===== 1928 =====
Results of the 1928 parliamentary election held on 6 and 7 October 1928:

Party		Votes per County					Total Votes	%	Seats
Party		Cēsis	Madona	Riga	Valka	Val- miera	Total Votes	%	Seats
Latvian Social Democratic Workers' Party	LSDSP	8,827	12,220	15,496	13,126	18,353	68,022	32.45%	8
Latvian Farmers' Union	LZS	11,707	13,981	13,188	13,246	10,889	63,011	30.06%	7
Latvian New Farmers and Small Landowners Party	LJSP	1,949	2,039	5,646	3,784	1,440	14,858	7.09%	2
Latgallian Independent Socialist Party	LNSP	815	449	1,968	736	3,446	7,414	3.54%	1
Party of Former Money Depositors and Other Victims		1,022	1,598	1,566	1,214	1,789	7,189	3.43%	1
Christian Union and Workers Party	KASP	1,204	661	1,730	1,214	1,937	6,746	3.22%	1
National Union	NA	1,131	981	1,738	925	1,836	6,611	3.15%	1
German-Baltic Party in Latvia	DbPL	426	977	2,590	237	428	4,658	2.22%	1
Democratic Centre	DC	764	465	1,437	959	615	4,240	2.02%	1
Union of Social Democrats and Farmers		609	1,250	871	938	569	4,237	2.02%	1
United Farmers		506	438	2,503	66	101	3,614	1.72%	0
All-Latvian National Assembly		645	892	1,517	263	281	3,598	1.72%	0
Union for Peace, Order and Production	MKRA	304	286	948	728	864	3,130	1.49%	0
Latvian Labour Union	LDS	677	393	1,159	389	335	2,953	1.41%	0
Latvian New Farmers' Union	LJS	324	358	688	260	445	2,075	0.99%	0
Latvian Women's Union		273	280	792	306	264	1,915	0.91%	0
Economic Association		228	173	589	520	340	1,850	0.88%	0
Orthodox and Public Workers		185	485	376	263	226	1,535	0.73%	0
Radical Democrats		77	155	773	60	137	1,202	0.57%	0
Zionist Organisation Mizrachi		59	122	57	158	97	493	0.24%	0
Latvian Polish-Catholic Union		47	46	128	26	24	271	0.13%	0
Valid votes		31,779	38,249	55,760	39,418	44,416	209,622	100.00%	24
Rejected votes							1,170	0.56%	
Valid envelopes							210,792	99.96%	
Rejected envelopes							90	0.04%	
Total polled							210,882		

===== 1925 =====
Results of the 1925 parliamentary election held on 3 and 4 October 1925:

Party		Votes per County						Total Votes	%	Seats		
Party		Cēsis	Madona	Riga	Valka	Val- miera	County Comm- ission	Total Votes	%	Con.	Com.	Tot.
Latvian Social Democratic Workers' Party	LSDSP	8,313	8,733	13,492	11,365	18,133	45	60,081	33.53%	8	0	8
Latvian Farmers' Union	LZS	9,986	10,415	11,585	12,540	11,098	16	55,640	31.05%	7	0	7
Social Democrats Mensheviks	SDM	1,481	3,613	1,954	3,289	1,544	6	11,887	6.63%	2	0	2
National Union	NA	1,361	1,358	2,258	1,381	2,267	4	8,629	4.82%	1	0	1
Latvian New Farmers' Union	LJS	1,168	1,124	2,374	1,011	1,775	6	7,458	4.16%	1	0	1
Democratic Centre	DC	943	1,080	2,322	1,032	1,251	6	6,634	3.70%	1	0	1
National Farmers' Union	NZS	770	968	1,440	426	693	3	4,300	2.40%	1	0	1
Congress of Destroyed Areas and Agricultural Association		354	655	2,371	354	250	5	3,989	2.23%	1	0	1
Latvian New Farmers-Small Landowners Party	LJSP	366	630	1,846	637	490	1	3,970	2.22%	1	0	1
Christian National Union	KNS	580	401	923	650	1,203	2	3,759	2.10%	0	0	0
German-Baltic Party in Latvia	DbPL	409	757	924	279	556	0	2,925	1.63%	0	0	0
Union for Peace, Order and Production	MKRA	444	198	853	504	766	2	2,767	1.54%	0	0	0
Economically Active Citizens		392	1,199	292	232	270	2	2,387	1.33%	0	0	0
Latvian Labour Union	LDS	487	181	451	219	257	1	1,596	0.89%	0	0	0
Latvian Farmers' Union		20	30	745	36	42	1	874	0.49%	0	0	0
National Group of Estonian Voters		28	35	15	489	38	0	605	0.34%	0	0	0
Agudas Israel		82	52	47	218	70	0	469	0.26%	0	0	0
Union of Latvian Democrats	LDS	26	27	289	37	62	2	443	0.25%	0	0	0
Party of Catholics and Christian Peasants	KKZP	32	61	106	16	26	0	241	0.13%	0	0	0
Zionist Organisation Mizrachi		17	23	49	58	55	0	202	0.11%	0	0	0
Supporters of J. Salmiņš		45	22	65	23	27	0	182	0.10%	0	0	0
Latgallian Democratic Party	LDP	22	44	51	39	12	0	168	0.09%	0	0	0
Valid votes		27,326	31,606	44,452	34,835	40,885	102	179,206	100.00%	23	0	23
Rejected votes												
Valid envelopes												
Rejected envelopes												
Total polled												
Registered electors		42,212	49,349	67,192	52,013	56,953		267,719				

===== 1922 =====
Results of the 1922 parliamentary election held on 7 and 8 October 1922:

Party		Votes per County					Total Votes	%	Seats		
Party		Cēsis	Riga	Valka	Val- miera	County Comm- ission	Total Votes	%	Con.	Com.	Tot.
Latvian Social Democratic Workers' Party	LSDSP	16,375	15,172	20,285	24,833	92	76,757	39.99%	11	0	11
Latvian Farmers' Union	LZS	18,823	12,014	16,621	12,974	59	60,491	31.51%	8	0	8
Union of Social Democrats – Mensheviks and Rural Workers	SDML	3,660	3,482	3,070	2,761	19	12,992	6.77%	2	0	2
Democratic Centre	DC	2,414	5,447	1,932	1,574	15	11,382	5.93%	1	0	1
Non-Partisan National Centre	BNC	2,618	2,649	1,676	2,063	15	9,021	4.70%	1	0	1
Christian National Union	KNS	2,406	1,975	1,961	2,010	25	8,377	4.36%	1	0	1
Latvian New Farmers' Union	LJS	1,538	1,600	940	600	6	4,684	2.44%	1	0	1
German-Baltic Party in Latvia	DbPL	1,299	996	515	660	5	3,475	1.81%	1	0	1
Land Workers' Association		64	929	46	36	2	1,077	0.56%	0	0	0
Group of Estonian Voters		22	35	586	158	2	803	0.42%	0	0	0
Latvian Fishermen's Union and Group of Sailors		30	658	14	93	0	795	0.41%	0	0	0
War Invalids, Families and Soldiers on Leave		207	200	205	181	0	793	0.41%	0	0	0
Ceire Cion	CC	155	89	287	130	2	663	0.35%	0	0	0
Colonel Jansons' List		154	180	138	159	6	637	0.33%	0	0	0
Valid votes		49,765	45,426	48,276	48,232	248	191,947	100.00%	26	0	26
Rejected votes							1,296	0.67%			
Valid envelopes							193,243				
Rejected envelopes											
Total polled											
Registered electors		68,863	59,804	65,389	59,458		253,514				
