= Telephone numbers in Latvia =

- Location of Latvia (dark green)
- Country: Latvia
- Continent: Europe
- Regulator: Public Utilities Commission
- Numbering plan type: Closed
- NSN length: 8, with some exceptions
- Format: Various
- Country code: +371
- International access: 00
- Long-distance: None

The Latvian telephone numbering plan is a telephone number assigning system used in Latvia. All the numbers consist of 8 digits with exceptions for special services. The assigning process is controlled by the Electronic Communications Office (Latvian: VAS "Elektroniskie sakari") and regulated by the Public Utilities Commission (Latvian: Sabiedrisko pakalpojumu regulēšanas komisija).

== Format ==
The country code for Latvia is +371. The international dialling prefix is "00". The country does not use trunk prefix. However, in 2008, the "6" was prepended to all landlines, and "2" to all mobile numbers.

During the Soviet occupation and until the transition in 1993, Latvia had the +7 013 area code.

=== Mobile telephones ===
- 2xх xx xxx

=== Geographic numbering ===
- 5 xx xxxxx, 6 xx xxxxx, 7 xx xxxxx

The 5-series is currently only reserved for future use. The 6-series is generally used for landlines and the 7-series is used with payphones throughout the country.

5 xx xxxxx; 6 0x xxxxx; 6 1x xxxxx; 6 2x xxxxx	Reserved for landlines
6 30 xxxxx	Landlines in Jelgava district
6 31 xxxxx	Landlines in Tukums district
6 32 xxxxx	Landlines in Talsi district
6 33 xxxxx	Landlines in Kuldiga district
6 34 xxxxx	Landlines in Liepāja district
6 35 xxxxx	Reserved for landlines in Ventspils district
6 36 xxxxx	Landlines in Ventspils district
6 37 xxxxx	Landlines in Dobele district
6 38 xxxxx	Landlines in Saldus district
6 39 xxxxx	Landlines in Bauska district
6 40 xxxxx	Landlines in Limbaži district
6 41 xxxxx	Landlines in Cēsis district
6 42 xxxxx	Landlines in Valmiera district
6 43 xxxxx	Landlines in Alūksne district
6 44 xxxxx	Landlines in Gulbene district
6 45 xxxxx	Landlines in Balvi district
6 46 xxxxx	Landlines in Rēzekne district
6 47 xxxxx	Landlines in Valka district
6 48 xxxxx	Landlines in Madona district
6 49 xxxxx	Landlines in Aizkraukle district
6 50 xxxxx	Landlines in Ogre district
6 51 xxxxx	Landlines in Aizkraukle district
6 52 xxxxx	Landlines in Jēkabpils district
6 53 xxxxx	Landlines in Preiļi district
6 54 xxxxx	Landlines in Daugavpils district
6 55 xxxxx	Reserved for landlines in Ogre district
6 56 xxxxx	Landlines in Krāslava district
6 57 xxxxx	Landlines in Ludza district
6 58 xxxxx	Landlines in Daugavpils district
6 59 xxxxx	Reserved for landlines in Cēsis district
6 6x xxxxx; 6 7x xxxxx	Landlines in Riga district
6 80 xxxxx	Reserved for landlines
6 82 xxxxx	Reserved for landlines in Valmiera district
6 83 xxxxx	Reserved for landlines in Jēkabpils district
6 84 xxxxx	Reserved for landlines in Liepāja district
6 85 xxxxx	Trunked radio networks and VPNs
6 86 xxxxx	Reserved for landlines in Jelgava district
6 87 xxxxx; 6 88 xxxxx	Reserved for landlines
6 89 xxxxx	Payphones in all Latvian cities (used until 31 December 2011)
6 9x xxxxx	Landlines in Riga district
7 89 xxxxx	Payphones in all Latvian cities (used from 1 January 2012)

=== Services ===
A variety of service numbers are assigned in the 1-series with lengths shorter than the standard 8 digits. Some of these services also provide 8-digit geographical numbers to be reachable from abroad.

==== Emergency ====
- 112 — Fire brigade, rescue services, civil protection (also general emergency number);
- 110 — Police;
- 113 — Ambulance;
- 114 — Gas emergency;
- 115 — Coast Guard

Calls to 112 are answered on average within 6 seconds and are answered in Latvian, English and Russian. In 98% of cases, the operator can detect the location of the caller within a minute.

==== Various client services ====
1xx	Generic client services provided by various companies; calling costs to these numbers may vary depending on a number-by-number and an operator-by-operator basis as for example Lattelecom's client service number is toll-free when called from their network's phones.
11x	Additional services provided by the telephone companies.
118x	Major inquiry services.
16xx	Internal client services which can be used by the network operators as these numbers can only be reached from the particular network.
18xx	Various services.
116xxx	Toll-free non-commercial social services.

=== Toll-free services ===
- 80x0xxxx—toll-free services.

=== Shared-cost services ===
- 810xxxxx—shared-cost services.

=== Premium rate services ===
- 88xx, 89xx, 82xxx, 90x0xxxx—premium-rate services.
