= Riga Governorate =

1713–1783 unit of Russia

Riga Governorate Рижская губерния (Russian)
- Governorate of the Russian Empire
- 1713–1783
- Flag
- Capital: Riga
- History
  - Established: 17 July 1713
  - Disestablished: 3 July 1783
Preceded by	Succeeded by
Swedish Livonia	Riga Viceroyalty

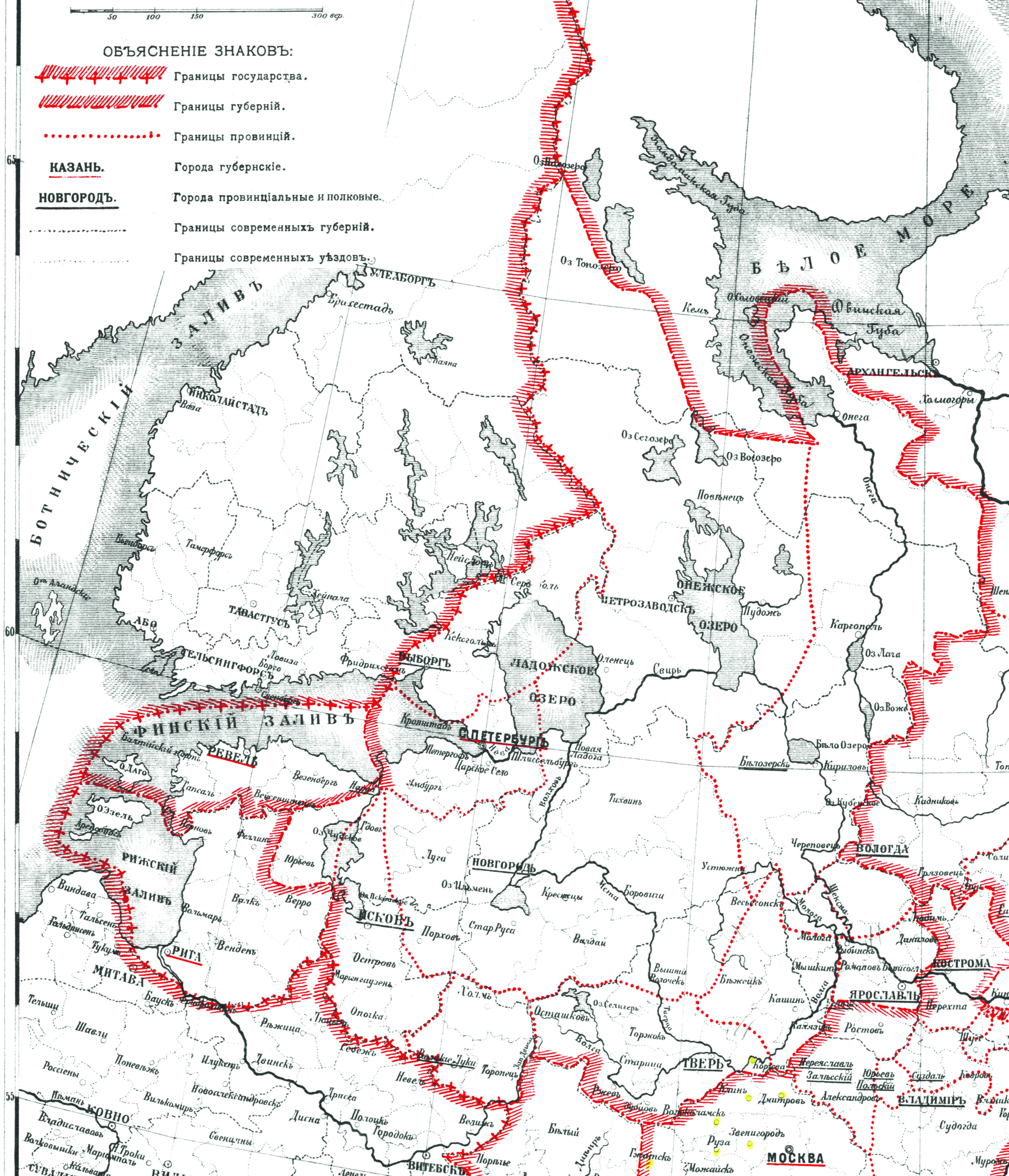
Map showing the Reval Governate, Riga Governate and Province of St Petersburg in 1720-1727

Riga Governorate (Latvian: Rīgas guberņa, Russian: Рижская губерния, romanized: Rizhskaya guberniya) was an administrative-territorial unit (guberniya) and one of the Baltic governorates of the Russian Empire, which existed from 1713 to 1783. The Province of Riga was formed to replace the Eastern Provinces of the Kingdom of Sweden in 1713. After the conquest of the regions of Ingermanland, Livonia and Estonia by Sweden in the Great Northern War in 1710. In 1713, the Provinces of Riga and Tallinn were separated into separate administrative units, and in 1713–1714, the organization and management of the Province of Riga were also defined.

== History ==
On July 2, 1731, with the approval of Empress Anna I and the ukase of the Governing Senate, the island of Osel (modern Saaremaa) received the status of a special region. Saaremaa remained a region of special status until the ukase of the Russian Empress Catherine II, which on February 21, 1765 liquidated Saaremaa as an independent province.

The Provinces of Riga and Tallinn were merged under the leadership of Governor General George Browne in 1775. The All-Russian Provincial Act of 1775 was extended to the Baltic provinces and on July 3, 1783, the Riga Governorate ceased to exist, handing over much of its affairs to the Riga Viceroyalty.

== Administrative division ==
In 1721 the Province of Riga was divided into 2 provinces:

- Province of Livland ( Riga, Pernov, Wenden and the island of Osel ) and the province of Smolensk Governorate ( Smolensk, Dorogobuzh, Roslavl, Vyazma )

In 1726 the Smolensk Governorate was transformed into an independent governorate. As a result, the Province of Riga was redistributed into 5 Provinces:

- Riga province
- Windau province
- Dorpat province
- Pernov province
- Ezel Province

At the end of the eighteenth century. the province consisted of 9 counties:

- Kreis Riga
- Kreis Wenden
- Kreis Wolmar
- Kreis Walk
- Kreis Dorpat
- Kreis Pernau
- Kreis Fellin
- Kreis Werro
- Kreis Ösel

== See also ==
- Baltic governorates
