= Livonia electoral district =

Constituency of the Russian Republic

Livonia
- Former Civilian constituency for the All-Russian Constituent Assembly
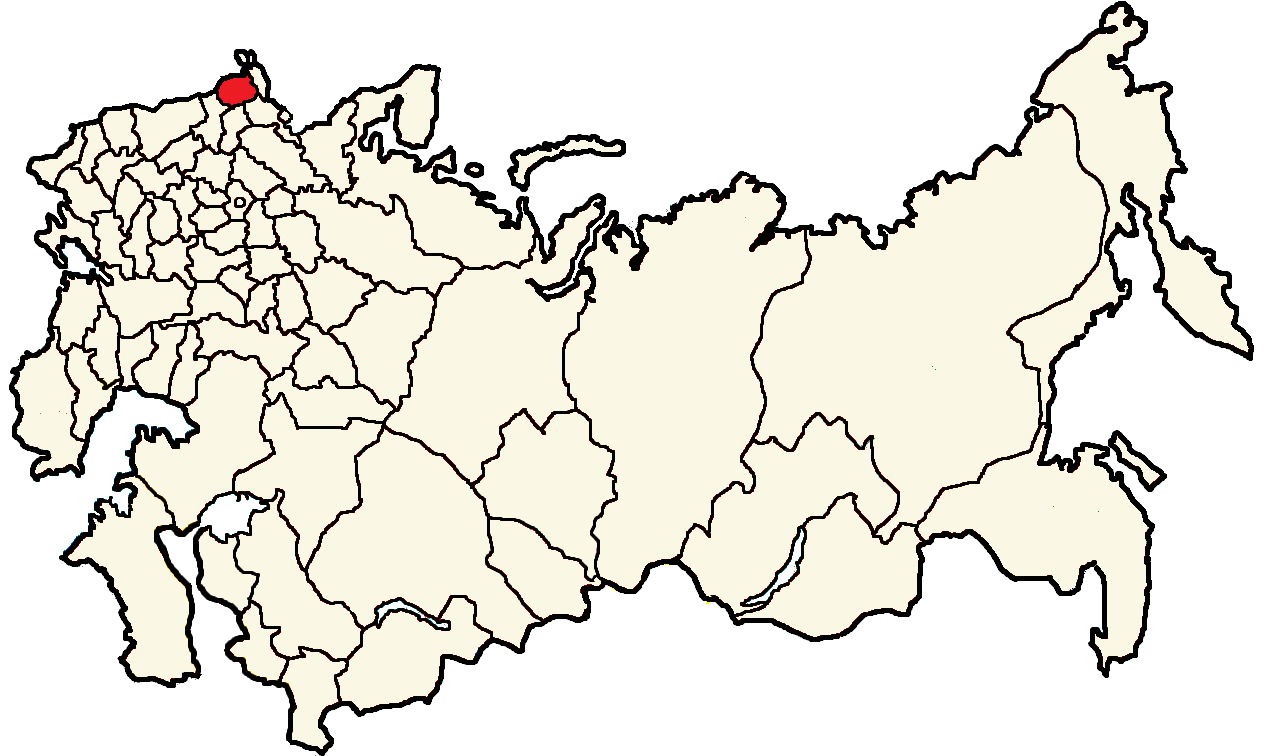

Former constituency
- Created: 1917
- Abolished: 1918
- Number of members: 4
- Number of Uyezd Electoral Commissions: 4
- Number of Urban Electoral Commissions: 1
- Number of Parishes: 207

The Livonia electoral district (Russian: Лифляндский избирательный округ) was a constituency created for the 1917 Russian Constituent Assembly election. The electoral district covered the Livonia Governorate, as well as the parts of the Courland Governorate not under German occupation.

97,781 votes (72%) were cast for Social-Democracy of the Latvian Territory, the Bolshevik affiliate organization in Latvia. Latvia was a Bolshevik stronghold at the time, as only in Latvia did the Social Democrats continue to function as a political party following the waves of repression 1905–1908. After the February Revolution, the political scene in Riga was similar to that of many other cities in Russia, with Bolsheviks becoming the dominant force in the soviets and competing for power with the moderate socialists and the city duma. By May 1917 the Bolsheviks had emerged as the main political force of Latvian Riflemen's soviet. Gradually the Bolsheviks began to dominate Riga, but on September 3, 1917 German troops seized control of the city. In September 1917 the Bolsheviks had some 12,000 members in Latvia, the Mensheviks had 2,600.

== Results ==
At the time of the election the city of Riga was under German occupation so no vote took place there. Some 9,000 votes were missing from the accounted vote tally according to U.S. historian Oliver Henry Radkey (whose account forms the basis of the results' table below). Radkey's carries the same totals as a resolution of the District Election Commission adopted November 26, 1917, reported in the Bolshevik organ Cīņa; which noted that all precincts in Kreis Wolmar had reported, the tallies of 4 precincts in Kreis Wenden were missing, 2 precincts in Kreis Walk were missing and 11 out of 16 precincts in Kreis Riga reporting.

Party	Kreis Riga & Kreis Wenden	%	Kreis Walk	%	Kreis Wolmar	%	Total	%
List 3 - Social-Democracy of the Latvian Territory	29,728	67.31	35,487	71.55	32,566	76.96	97,781	71.86
List 1- Lettish Peasants Union	11,791	26.70	11,204	22.59	8,258	19.52	31,253	22.97
List 2 - Mensheviks	2,650	6.00	2,906	5.86	1,490	3.52	7,046	5.18
Total:	44,169		35,487		42,314		136,080	

Deputies Elected
Goldmanis	Lettish Peasant Union
Berzin	SD of Latvian Territory
Peterson	SD of Latvian Territory
Rozin	SD of Latvian Territory
