= Aiva =

Aiva is a feminine and masculine given name. Notable people with the name include:

- Aiva Anagnostiadis (born 2007), Australian racing driver
- Aiva Aparjode (born 1977), Latvian luger
- Aiva Arquette (born 2003), American baseball player
- Aiva Vīksna (born 1967), Latvian entrepreneur and politician

== See also ==
- AIVA (Artificial Intelligence Virtual Artist), an electronic composer
- Aivars, a given name
