= Vaive Parish =

Parish of Latvia

- parish of Latvia
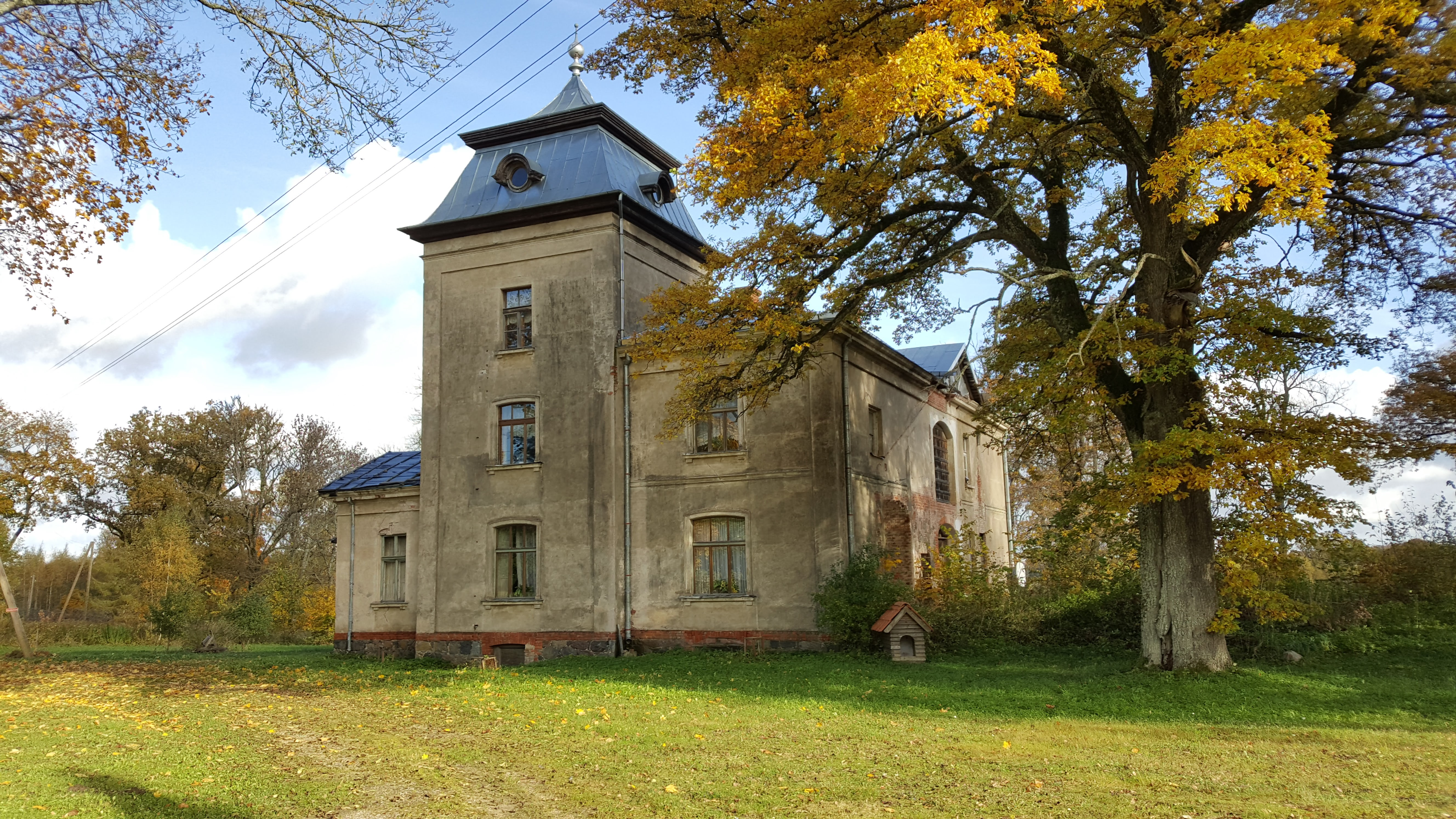

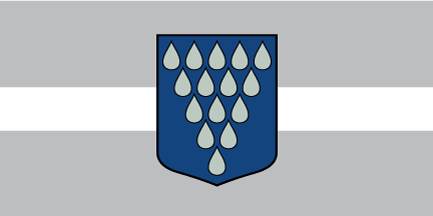
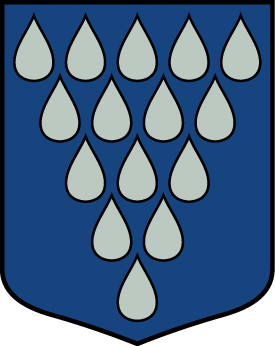
- Flag Coat of arms

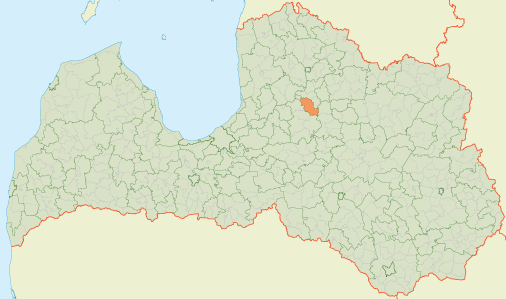
- 57°14′00″N 25°25′56″E
- Country: Latvia

Area
  - Total: 153.74 km^{2} (59.36 sq mi)
  - Land: 151.2 km^{2} (58.4 sq mi)
  - Water: 2.54 km^{2} (0.98 sq mi)

Population (1 January 2025)
  - Total: 1,387
  - Density: 9.173/km^{2} (23.76/sq mi)

Vaive Parish (Latvian: Vaives pagasts) is an administrative unit of Cēsis Municipality in the Vidzeme region of Latvia (prior to 2009 - of Cēsis district). Its administrative center is Rīdzene.

The population in 2021 was 1,328.

Before 1925, Vaive Parish was called Veismaņi Parish. It was a part of Cēsu apriņķis.

== Towns, villages and settlements of Vaive parish ==
- Rīdzene
- Ģūģeri
- Eicēni
- Kaupēni
- Krīvi
- Lielmaņi
- Mežmaļi
- Pinderes
- Pūtēji
- Rāmuļi
- Rāmuļu muiža (Rāmuļi Manor)
- Vaive
- Veismaņi
