= Jānis Grasbergs =

Latvian politician (born 1986)

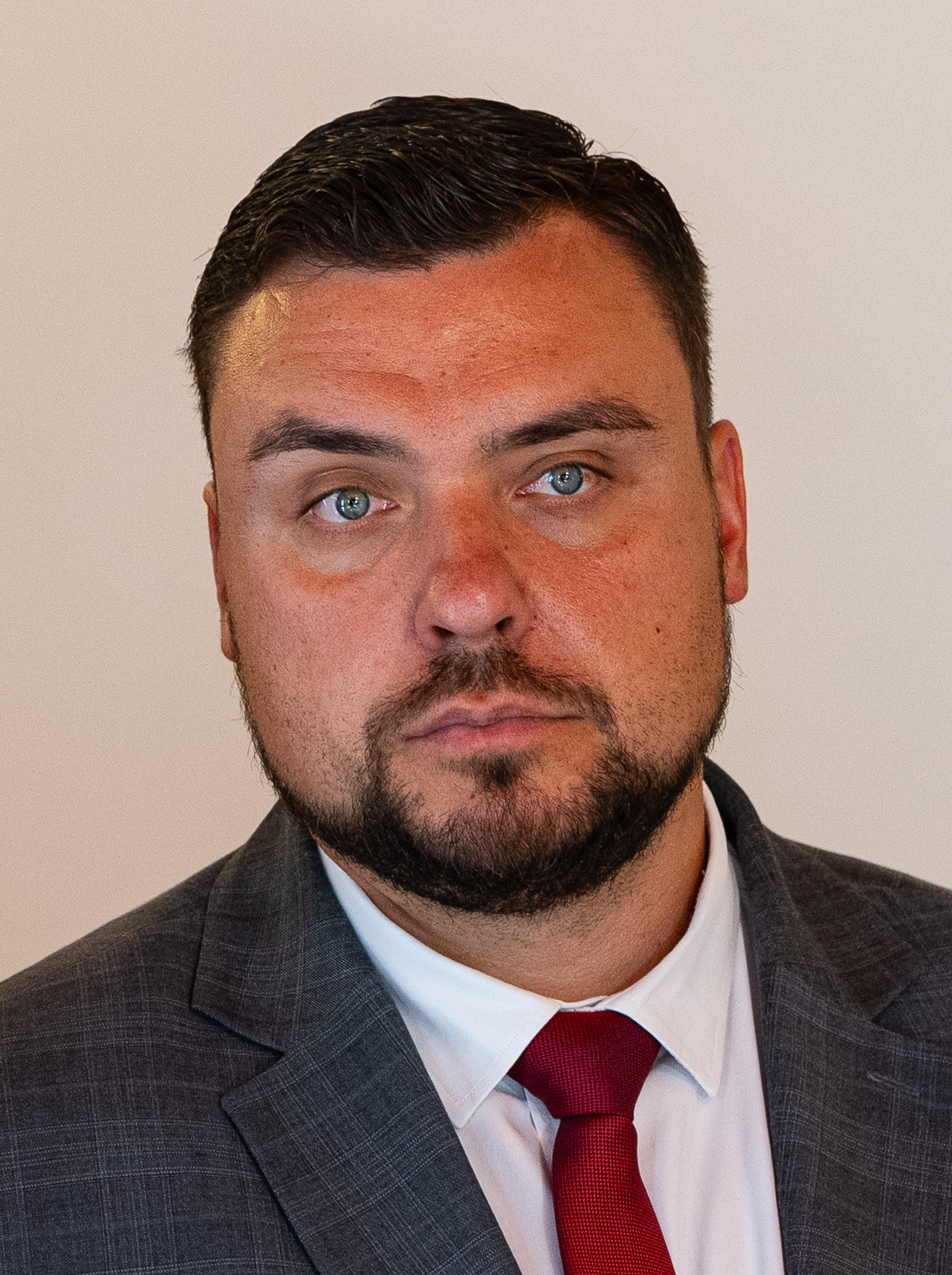
- Grasbergs in 2024

Member of the Saeima
- Incumbent
- Assumed office 1 November 2022
- Constituency: Livonia

Personal details
- Born: 31 October 1986 (age 39)
- Party: National Alliance

Jānis Grasbergs (born 31 October 1986) is a Latvian politician of the National Alliance who was elected member of the Saeima in 2022. He served as deputy speaker until 2023, when he was elected deputy secretary of the Saeima.
