= Cēsis district =

District of Latvia

Coordinates: 57°19′N 25°16′E

Cēsis
- District
- Coat of arms

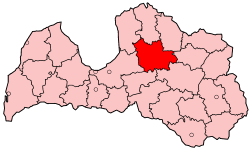
- Country: Latvia

Area
  - Total: 3,062 km^{2} (1,182 sq mi)

Population
  - Total: 56,265
  - Density: 18.38/km^{2} (47.59/sq mi)
- Website: cesurajons.lv/

Cēsis district (Latvian: Cēsu rajons) was an administrative division of Latvia, located in the Vidzeme region, in the country's north-east. It bordered the former districts of Valmiera and Valka to the north, Limbaži and Riga to the west, Gulbene to the east, Ogre and Madona to the south. It was organized into two cities, a municipality and twenty one parishes, each with a local government authority. The center of the district was the city of Cēsis.

Districts were eliminated during the administrative-territorial reform in 2009.

== Cities, municipalities and parishes in the Cēsis district ==
- Amata Municipality
- Cēsis city
- Drusti Parish
- Dzērbene Parish
- Ineši Parish
- Jaunpiebalga Parish
- Kaive Parish
- Liepa Parish
- Līgatne city
- Līgatne Parish
- Mārsnēni Parish
- Nītaure Parish
- Priekuļi Parish
- Raiskuma Parish
- Stalbe Parish
- Straupe Parish
- Rauna Parish
- Skujene Parish
- Taurene Parish
- Vaive Parish
- Vecpiebalga Parish
- Veselava Parish
- Zaube Parish
- Zosēni Parish

== See also ==
- Kreis Wenden
