= Krimulda Parish =

Parish of Latvia

- parish of Latvia
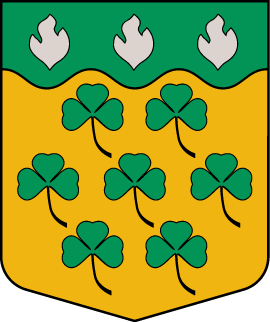
- Coat of arms

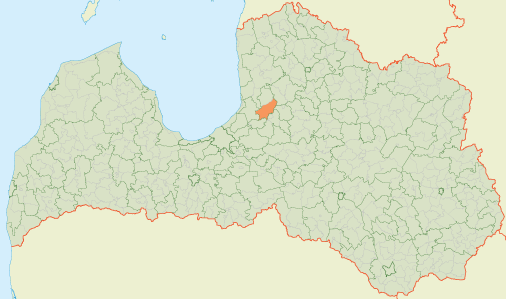
- Coordinates: 57°12′46″N 24°47′41″E
- Country: Latvia

Population (1 January 2026)
  - Total: 3,781
- Time zone: Eastern European Time

Krimulda Parish (Latvian: Krimuldas pagasts) is an administrative unit of Sigulda Municipality in the Vidzeme region of Latvia. Prior to the 2009 administrative reforms it was part of Riga district.
