= Valka county =

18th–20th century county in Latvia

Valka County: Valkas apriņķis; Kreis Walk; Валкскій уѣздъ
- County
- Valkas apriņķis within Latvia in 1940
- Country: Russian Empire; Latvia
- Russian Governorate: Livonia
- Established: 1745
- Abolished: 1949
- Capital: Valka (Walk)

Area
  - Total: 6,030.25 km^{2} (2,328.29 sq mi)

Population (1897)
  - Total: 120,585
  - Density: 19.9967/km^{2} (51.7912/sq mi)

Valka county within the Governorate of Livonia

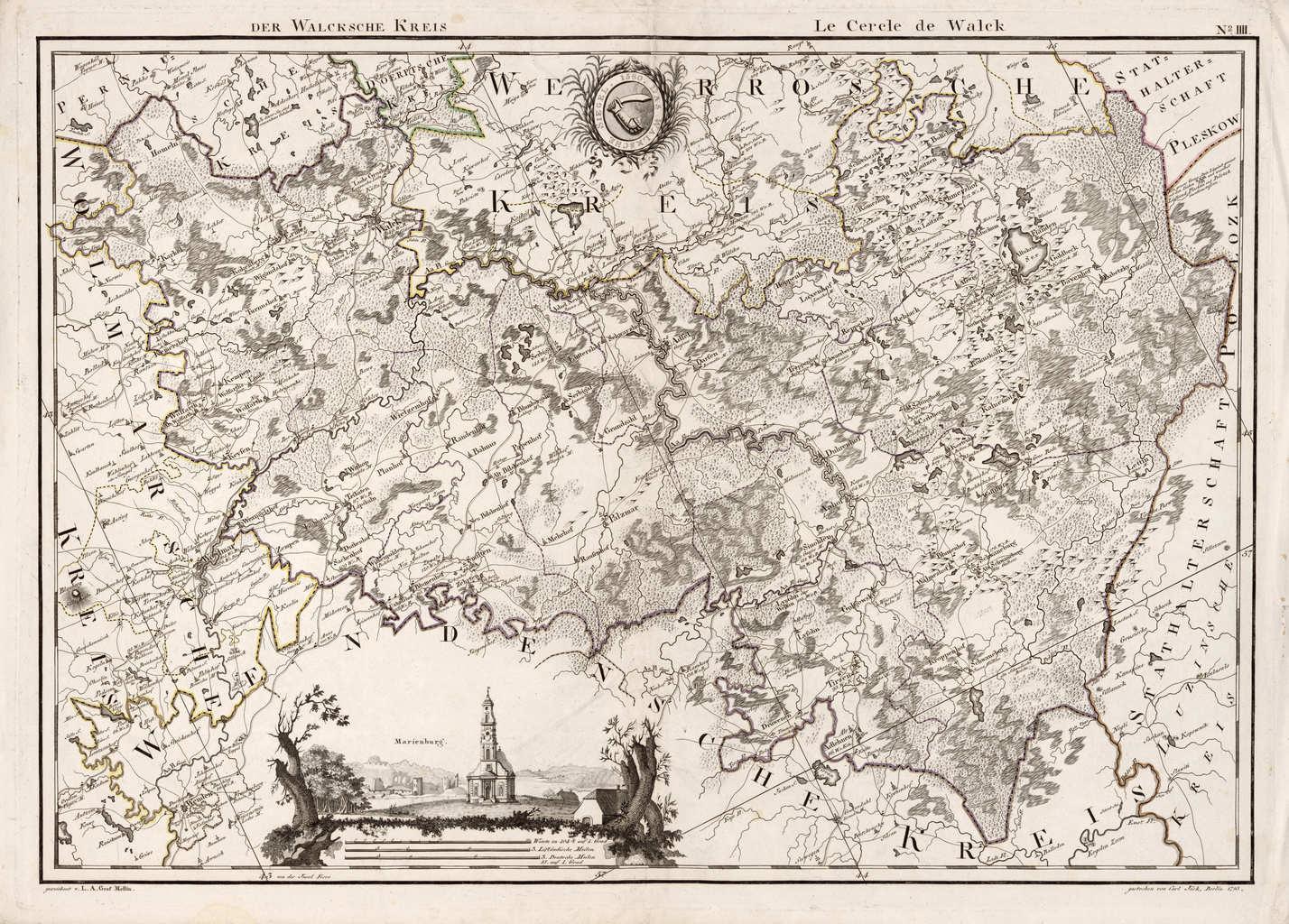
Valkas apriņķis (Walksche Kreis) on the map of Ludwig August Mellin (1798)

Valka county (Latvian: Valkas apriņķis; German: Kreis Walk, Russian: Валкскій уѣздъ, romanized: Valkskiy uyezd) was a historic county in the Governorate of Livonia, and in the Republic of Latvia dissolved during the administrative territorial reform of the Latvian SSR in 1949. Its capital was Valka (Walk).

== History ==
The county of Valka was created during the administrative territorial reform of the Governorate of Riga in 1783 by merging of parishes from the preexisting Kreis Riga and Kreis Wenden.

After the establishment of the Republic of Latvia in 1918, the Valkas apriņķis existed until 1949, when the Council of Ministers of the Latvian SSR split it into the newly created districts (rajons) of Valka and Smiltene (dissolved in 1959).

== Demographics ==
At the time of the Russian Empire Census of 1897, the county had a population of 120,585. Of these, 87.9% spoke Latvian, 7.2% Estonian, 2.1% German, 1.3% Russian, 1.1% Yiddish, 0.2% Polish and 0.1% Romani as their native language.
