= Jānis Skrastiņš =

Latvian bobsledder

Personal information
- Nationality: Latvian
- Born: 7 July 1955 (age 69); Rencēni, Latvian SSR, Soviet Union

Sport
- Sport: Bobsleigh

Jānis Skrastiņš (born 7 July 1955) is a Latvian bobsledder. He competed in the four man event at the 1984 Winter Olympics, representing the Soviet Union.
