= Anna Seile =

Latvian politician (1939–2019)

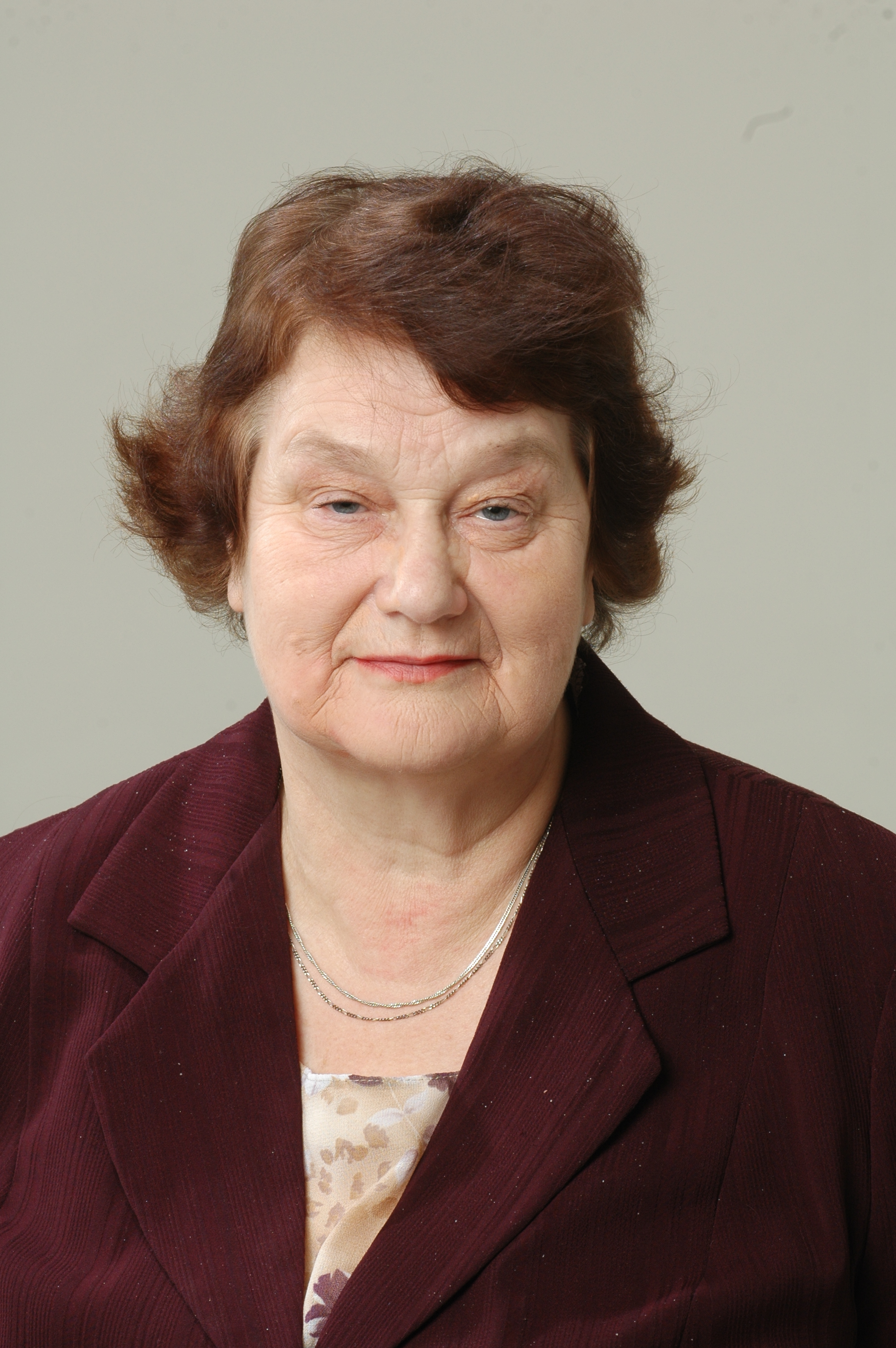

Deputy of the Saeima
- In office 1993–2010

Personal details
- Born: 27 September 1939 Mežotne parish, Latvia
- Died: 20 June 2019 (aged 79)
- Education: University of Latvia

Anna Seile (27 September 1939 – 20 June 2019) was a Latvian politician who served as a deputy of the Saeima.
