= Aiva Vīksna =

Latvian entrepreneur and politician (born 1967)

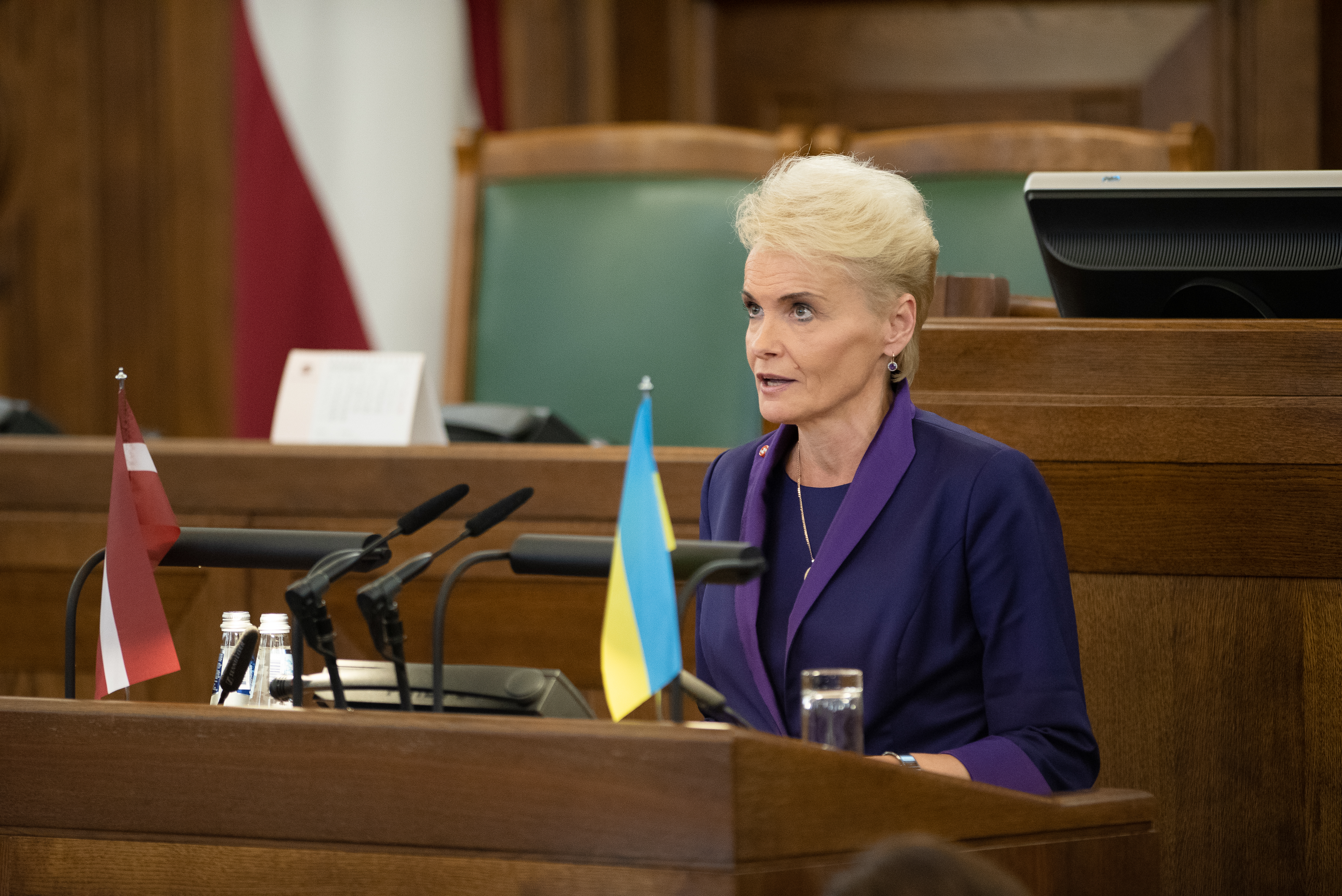
- Born: November 8, 1967 (age 59); Gulbene, Latvia
- Education: University of Latvia
- Occupations: entrepreneur, politician
- Political party: United List

Aiva Vīksna (born November 8, 1967) is a Latvian entrepreneur and politician. She is a member of the Saeima from the United List.

== Biography ==
In 1991, she obtained the qualification of a chemist and lecturer at the University of Latvia.

In 2014, together with her partners, Vīksna founded the catamaran production company SIA "O YACHTS". In 2017, she founded SIA "LatBan syndicate No. 1".

From 2011 to 2020, Vīksna worked as a council member at the Latvian-British Chamber of Commerce.

In 2022, she ran for the 14th Latvian parliament (Saeima) elections from the Vidzme list for the United List. She was elected to the 14th Saeima. As a member of parliament, she is known for promoting mortgage reform and for sufficient business assets shown in the declaration.

In 2006, she was elected vice president of the Latvian Employers' Confederation (LDDK). Since 2005, she has also been a member of the Advisory Council for Small and Medium Enterprises and Crafts of the Ministry of Economics of the Republic of Latvia. Since 2015, she has been a member of the association LATBAN (Latvian Business Angel Network).

She is the author of the project "Enhancing Women’s Role in Society, Business, and Development," within which a visit of five Iraqi women entrepreneurs and leaders to Latvia was organized in October 2008. In August 2008, she initiated the project "Mentoring Workshop. West-East," which involved five representatives from the Afghan Women's Business Federation.
