= Aleksandrs Sakovskis =

Latvian Russian politician

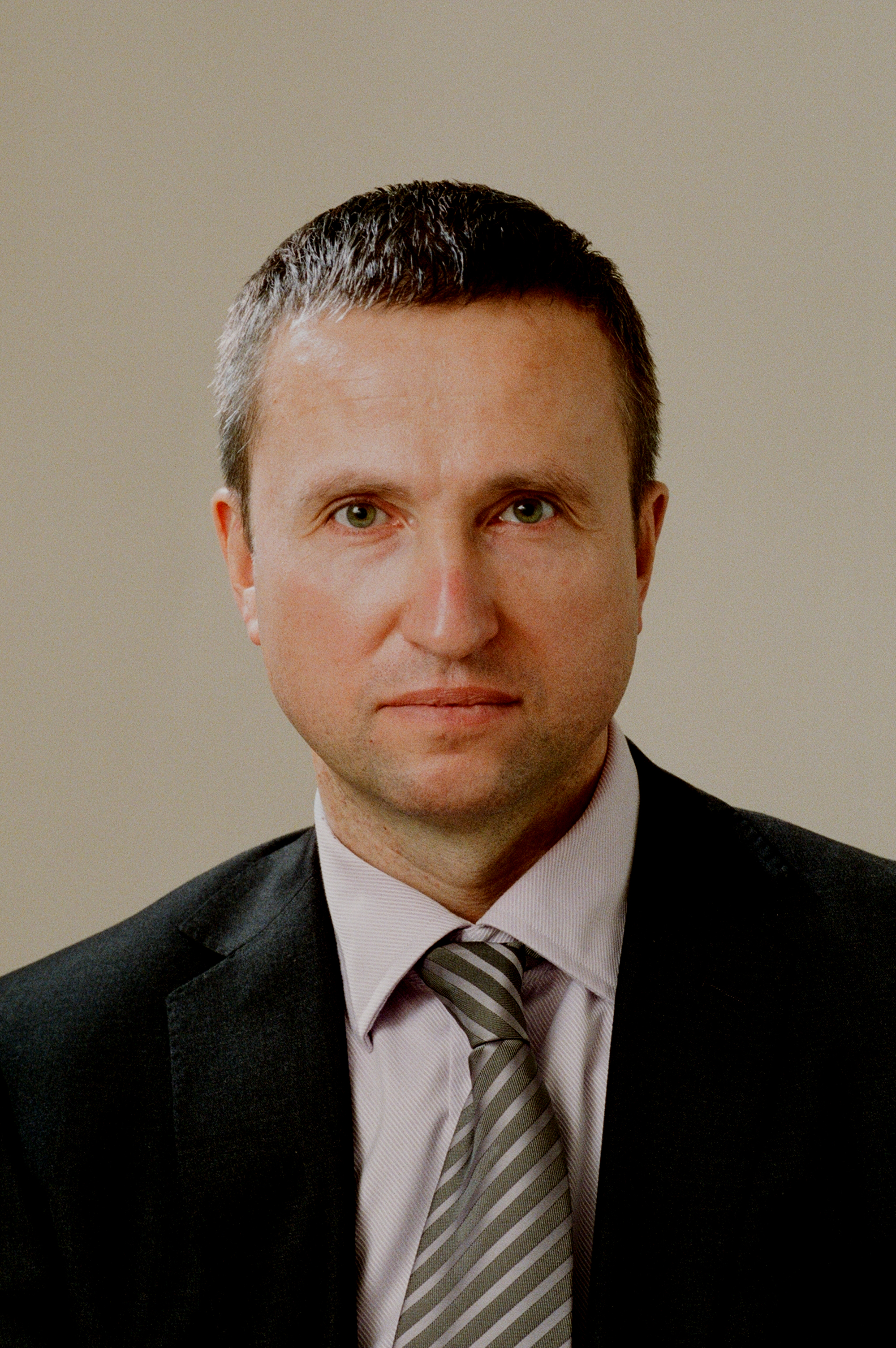

Deputy of the Saeima
- Incumbent
- Assumed office 2010

Personal details
- Born: 11 March 1965 (age 61) Latvian SSR
- Party: Harmony

Aleksandrs Sakovskis (Russian: Александр Саковский; born 1965) is a Latvian Russian politician. He is a member of Harmony and a deputy of the 10th and 11th Saeima.

== General references ==
"Aleksandrs Sakovskis" (in Latvian). Saskaņas Centrs. Archived from the original on 2011-10-16.
