= Dzintars Ābiķis =

Latvian politician

Member of the 5th through 11th Saeima
- In office 1993 – 2014

Personal details
- Born: June 3, 1952 (age 73) Ventspils, Liepāja Oblast, Latvian SSR, USSR
- Other political affiliations: Latvian Way (1993—1998); People's Party (1998—2009); Unaffiliated (2009—2010); Unity (2010—2014)

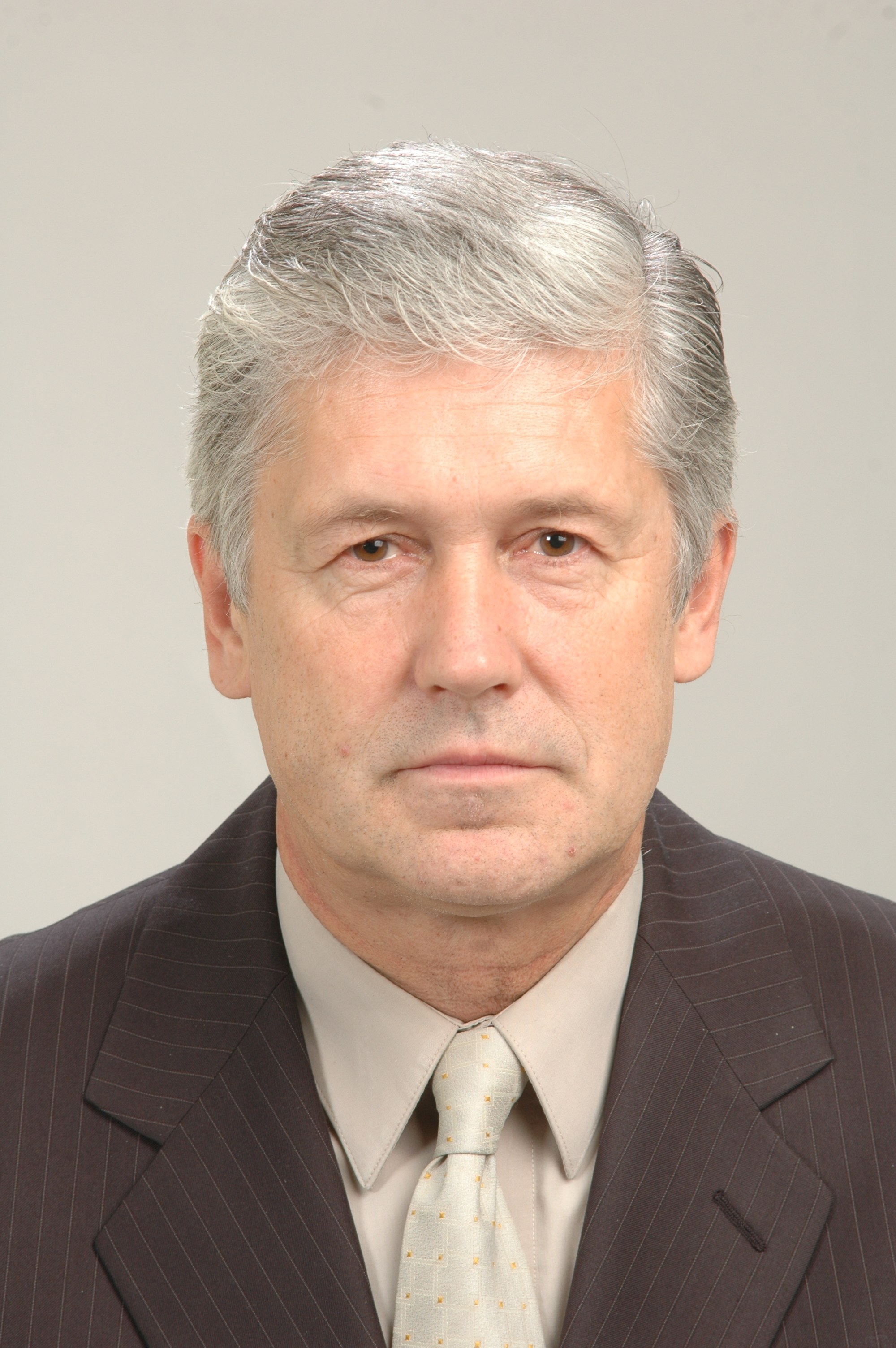

Dzintars Ābiķis (born 3 June 1952 in Ventspils) is a Latvian politician and a Deputy of the Saeima since 1993. He is a member of the People's Party.
