= Ina Druviete =

Latvian politician

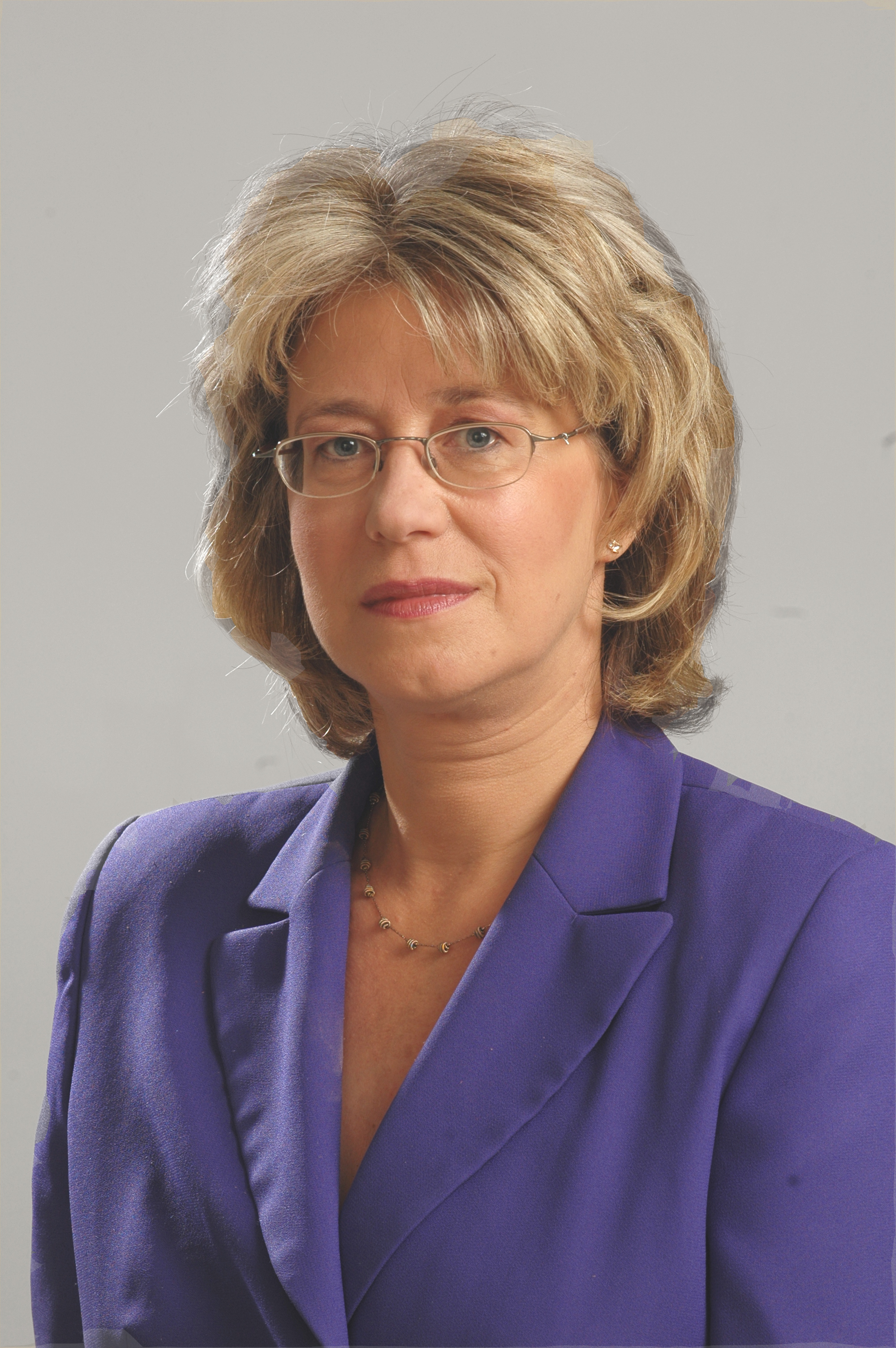
Ina Druviete

Ina Druviete (born 29 May 1958 in Riga, Latvia) is the Vice-rector of the Humanities and Educational Sciences in the University of Latvia (since 2015), Dr. habil.philol. (since 1996), professor of General Linguistics (since 1997). She was the Minister of Education and Science of the Republic of Latvia in 2004–2006 and 2014. She is a researcher in the Latvian Language Institute of the University of Latvia (since 1992), and a Member of the Latvian Parliament (since 2002).

Ina Druviete graduated from the University of Latvia in 1981 with a degree in the Latvian language and literature. Gradually she became a respected researcher in this field and was awarded several grants (Fulbright Foreign Scholarship among them). She has published approximately 300 publications, mainly on linguistics, sociolinguistics and language policy.

Professional Activities and Memberships, Editorial Boards: Vice-President, European Federation of National Institutions for Language (EFNIL) (2006-2009). Member, State Language Commission under the Auspices of the President of Latvia (2002-2010). Chairperson, Latvian Language Council of the State Language Center(1992-2002. Member, Editorial Board of series "Studies in World Language Problems" (John Benjamins Publishing Company). Correspondent of "Sociolinguistica. International Yearbook of European Sociolinguistics" (De Gruyter). Member of the Editorial Board of journal "Language Policy" (Springer)(2002-2009). Member of the Editorial Board of the journal “Taikomoji Kalbotyra”(Vilnius). Member of the Editorial Board of the journals “"Linguistica Lettica", "Proceedings of the Latvian Academy of Sciences. Part A”, “Acta Universitas Latviensis. Linguistics”, “Proceedings of the Daugavpils University”. Vice-President, Latvian Association of University Women (1993-1996)

Parliamentary Activities: Chairperson of Education, Culture and Science Committee, Parliament of Latvia (2010⎼2014); Chairperson of Human Rights and Social Affairs Committee, Parliament of Latvia (2002⎼2004); Head of Latvia delegation to Euro-Mediterranean Parliamentary Assembly (2011⎼2014); Member of Latvia delegation to OSCE (2010); Member of Latvia delegation to IPU ((2006⎼2009); Member of Latvia delegation to PACE (2002⎼2004).

Awards: The Order of the Three Stars, Third Class, Republic of Latvia (2012); The Order of the Terra Mariana, Second Class, Republic of Estonia (2005); The Cicero Award (2005); The Friendly Appeal Award (2002); Anna Ābele Memorial Prize (1990); Prize of the Executive Council of the Latvia Academy of Sciences (1982, 1990).
