= Ausma Kantāne-Ziedone =

Latvian actress and politician (1941–2022)

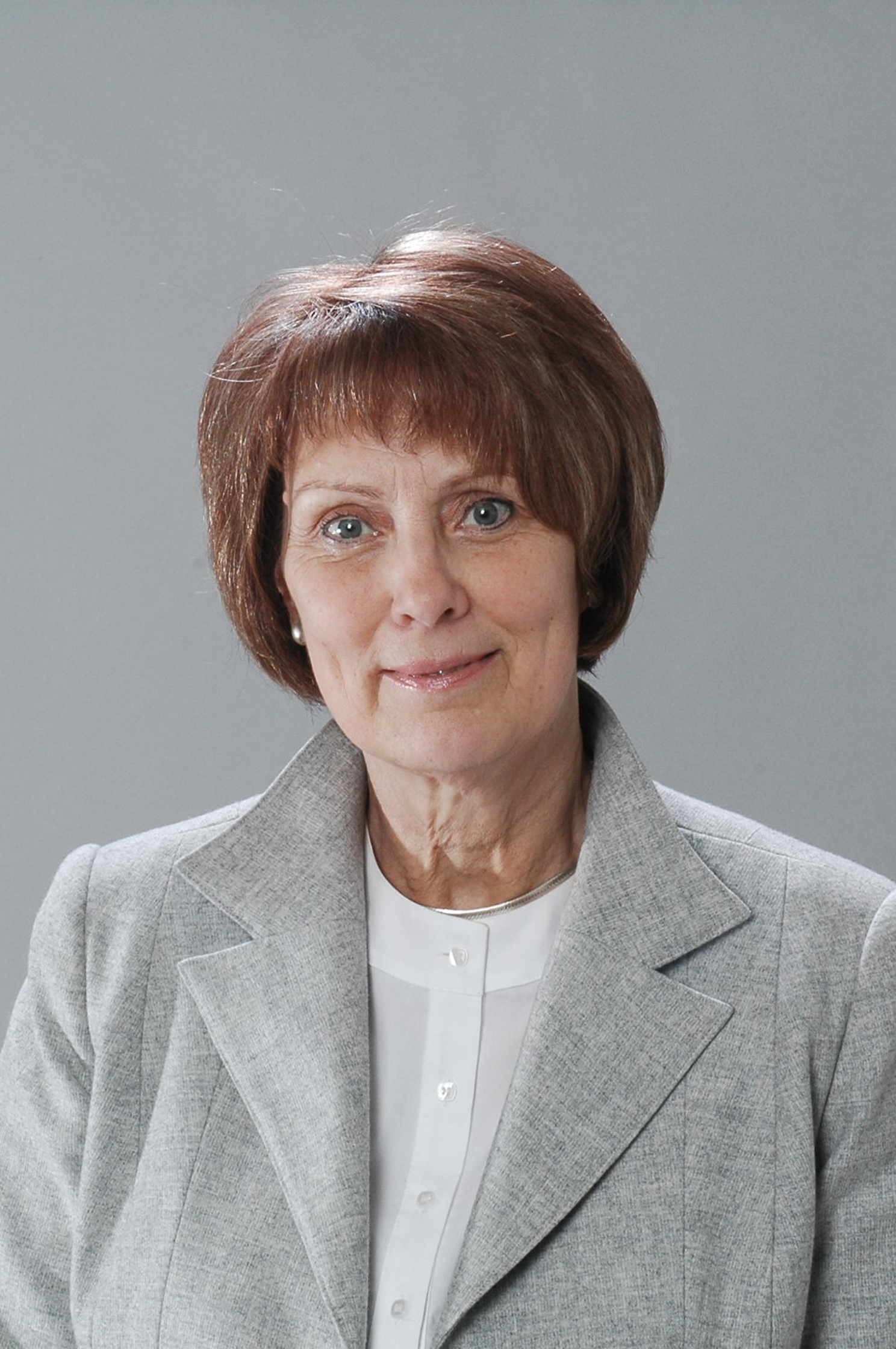
- Kantāne-Ziedone in 2010

Deputy of Saeima
- In office 7 November 2006 – 10 November 2010

Deputy of Saeima
- In office 5 November 2002 – 7 November 2006

Personal details
- Born: 10 November 1941 Riga, Reichskommissariat Ostland, Germany (now Latvia)
- Died: 29 May 2022 (aged 80) Riga, Latvia
- Party: New Era Party

Ausma Kantāne-Ziedone (10 November 1941 – 29 May 2022) was a Latvian actress and politician.

She was the widow of late poet Imants Ziedonis.
