= Alūksne district =

District of Latvia

Alūksne
- District
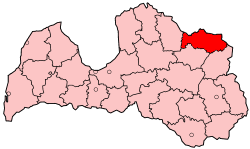
- Country: Latvia

Area
  - Total: 2,243 km^{2} (866 sq mi)

Population
  - Total: 24,159
  - Density: 10.77/km^{2} (27.90/sq mi)
- Website: aluksne.lv

Alūksne district (Latvian: Alūksnes rajons) was an administrative division of Latvia, located in Vidzeme region, in the country's north-east, 202 km (126 mi) from the capital city Riga. The district had international borders with Estonia (border 103.8 km/64.35 miles) and Russia (border 46.4 km/28.77 miles), and internal borders with the districts of Valka (51.7 km/32.05 miles), Gulbene (98.1 km/60.83 miles) and Balvi (57.4 km/35.58 miles). The main city in the district was Alūksne.

After the administrative-territorial reform of 2009 the Alūksne district was divided between Alūksne Municipality and Ape Municipality.

== Cities and parishes in the Alūksne district ==
- Alūksne town
- Ape town
- Alsviķi parish
- Anna parish
- Gaujiena parish
- Ilzene parish
- Jaunalūksne parish
- Jaunanna parish
- Jaunlaicene parish
- Kalncempji parish
- Liepna parish
- Maliena parish
- Mālupe parish
- Mārkalne parish
- Pededze parish
- Trapene parish
- Veclaicene parish
- Vireši parish
- Zeltiņi parish
- Ziemeri parish
