= Latvian-British Chamber of Commerce =

Institution in Bristol, England

Latvian-British Chambers of Commerce
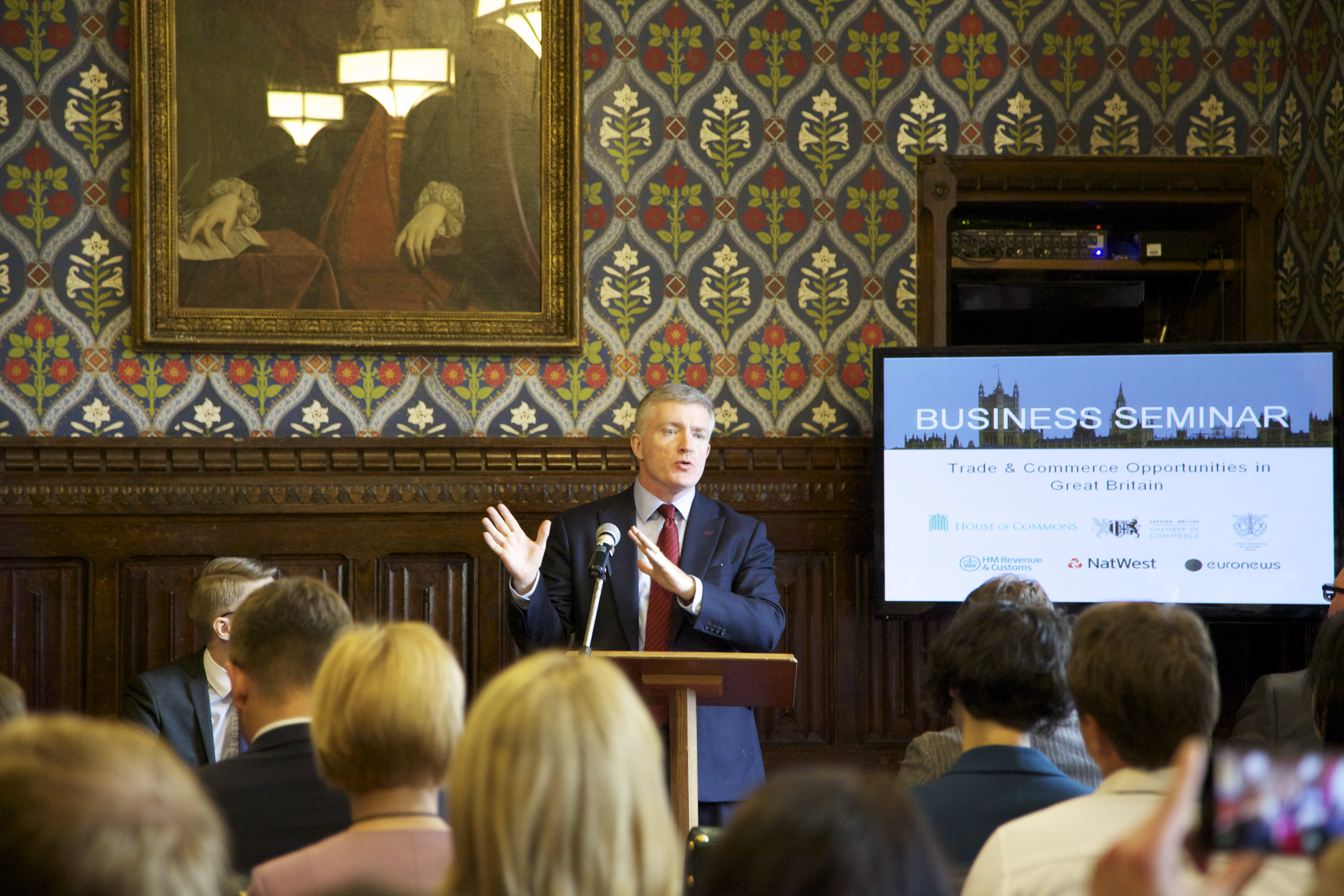
- Mark Prisk MP at the LBCC seminar, House of Commons, London (7 July 2015)
- Abbreviation: LBCC
- Formation: 2010
- Dissolved: 2021
- Legal status: Non-governmental organization, Chamber of Commerce, Social enterprise
- Location: Chapel Court, Yanley Lane, Long Ashton, Bristol BS41 9LB
- Region served: United Kingdom, Latvia, Baltic states

The Latvian-British Chamber of Commerce was an independent institution, NGO, and social enterprise based in Bristol, England. It was first established in 2010. The mission of the Latvian-British Chamber of Commerce was to "encourage, promote and foster business interests and commercial relations between Latvia and the UK within the core fields of technology, innovation and start-ups." The Latvian-British Chamber of Commerce was dissolved on 19 January 2021, according the information from the Companies House.

Within their spectrum of services, the Latvian-British Chamber of Commerce also acted as a Latvian Citizen Advice institution for UK-based Latvians. They were officially recognised by the various UK governmental organisations and institutions.

== History ==
The Latvian-British Chamber of Commerce was first established on 13 October 2010 in Mayfair, London. It received an official permission for using and registering the sensitive name "Chamber of Commerce" from the national body, British Chambers of Commerce and the Companies House. Officially closed in 2021.

Between 2010 and 2016, the head office for the Latvian-British Chamber of Commerce was based at Hanover Square in Mayfair, London. The head office moved in mid-2016 to the Long Ashton Business Park, Bristol. The Latvian-British Chamber of Commerce legal form is a "company by guarantee".

It is a UK-based NGO and has been created as a social enterprise. Latvian-British Chamber of Commerce provides various digital products and services to its members (companies and individuals) and invests back into society for social good through different projects and activities.

== Corporate Structure ==
The Chamber is governed by an elected Board, which is managed by the Chief Executive with the support of the Administration Team & Advisors in the UK and Latvia.

The Latvian-British Business Council is a volunteer-based platform positioned under the Latvian-British Chamber of Commerce. It works on the request of the Board and provides voluntary advice to the Chamber of Commerce on specific matters and issues. The Business Council consists of Goodwill Ambassadors such as Mr Mark Prisk MP, Ex-President of Latvia, H.E. Guntis Ulmanis, the Chairman of Latvian Chamber of Commerce and Industry, Mr Aigars Rostovskis, and the Chairman of the Latvian Association of Local and Regional Governments, Mr Andris Jaunsleinis, alongside others.

== Core Focus ==
The core focus for the Latvian-British Chamber of Commerce were within the fields of technology, innovation and start-ups. The Chamber sought to bring Latvian, Baltic and UK businesses together through trade missions, conferences, networking events, business lunches and, in turn, through encouraging a strong peer-support network.

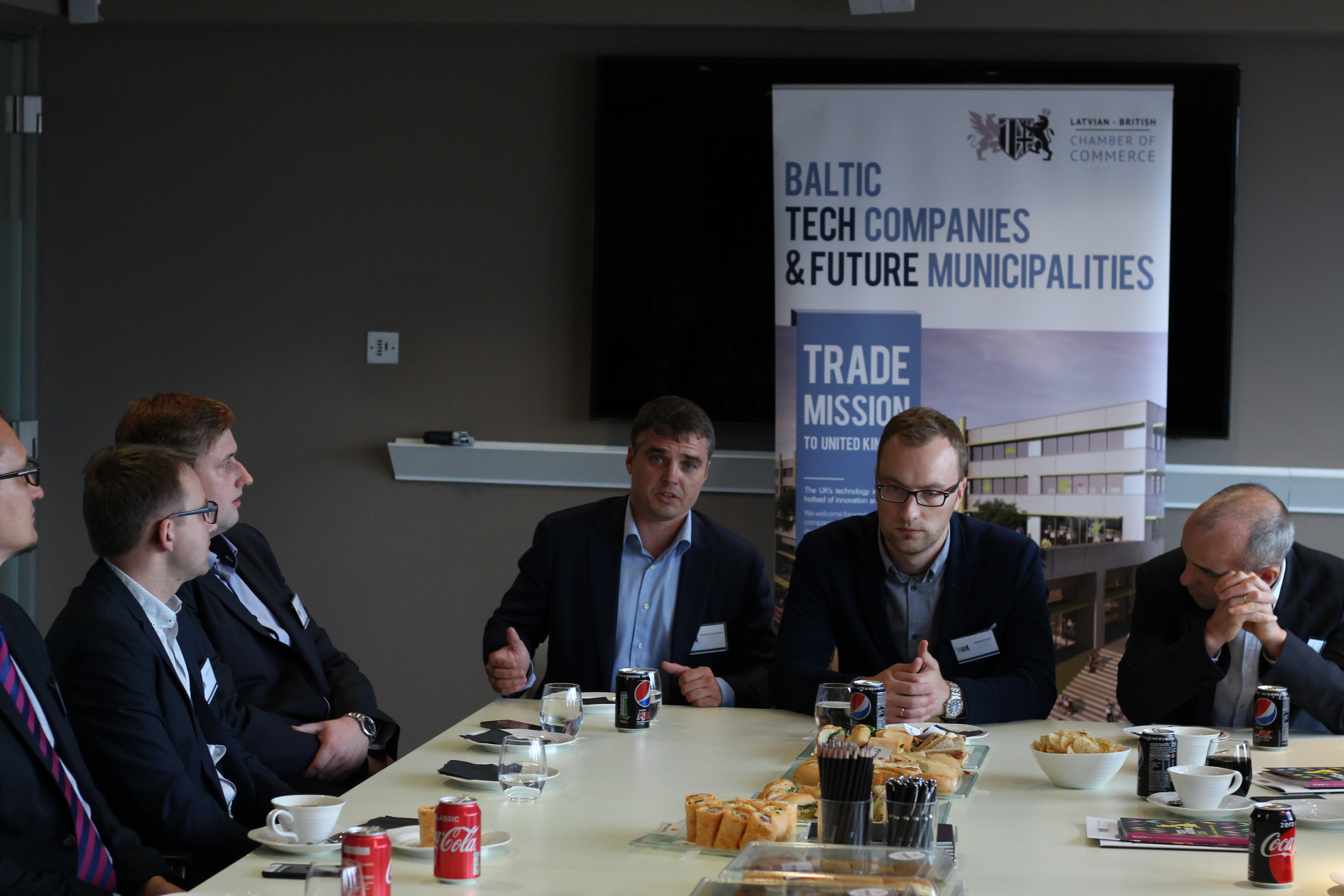
Baltic Tech entrepreneurs in London, UK (September 2016)

In September 2016, the Chamber of Commerce organised the first Baltic Tech Trade Mission to London and Bristol. This brought together a number of rapidly growing IT companies from the three Baltic countries - Latvia, Estonia and Lithuania - in order to create new international business partnerships and see an exchange of new ideas.

The trade mission convened British digital business representatives, speakers and entrepreneurs to discuss innovation, "future cities", technology. and finance. Participants addressed the technical and economic challenges facing Baltic technology companies and municipalities.

The Latvian-British Chamber of Commerce is an official partner of the various leading UK corporations, associations and membership organisations, including bodies such as the Royal Bank of Scotland, NatWest, Companies House, HM Revenue & Customs, West London Business, Tech Nordic Advocates, and others.

== Activities ==
The Latvian-British Chamber of Commerce is widely was seen as a new generation of Chambers of Commerce. The UK Prime Minister's Investment Envoy has acknowledged the innovative approach taken by the Chamber through its global programmes, focussed on the principles of connectivity, innovation and opportunities, providing new digital products and services to its members.

Latvian-British Chamber of Commerce believed that the future of bilateral Chambers of Commerce needs to be digital, with an innovative approach to encourage and promote commercial relations between countries and also provide advice to their citizens in a country of residence.

This business approach led the Chamber to create new digital products and services for the UK-based Latvians and Latvian companies that move or open their businesses from Latvia to the UK. For example, the Latvian-British Chamber of Commerce created the "Latvian citizen advice" digital tools - available as a smartphone app, tablet app, and website platform - in order to advise UK-based Latvian citizens, professionals and travellers from Latvia in the UK.
