= Riga district =

District of Latvia

Coordinates: 56.9489°N 24.1064°E

Rīgas rajons
- District
- Riga district
- Coat of arms

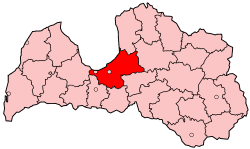
- Country: Latvia
- Formed: 1949
- Dissolved: 2009
- Seat: Riga

Area
  - Total: 3,058 km^{2} (1,181 sq mi)

Population
  - Total: 173,116
  - Density: 56.61/km^{2} (146.6/sq mi)
- Website: www.rrp.lv

Riga district (Latvian: Rīgas rajons) was an administrative division of Latvia, located in Semigallia and Vidzeme regions, in the centre of the country. It was the de facto successor of the historical Riga county since 1949.

Beginning from the west and counterclockwise to the east, Riga district bordered the districts of Tukums, Jelgava, Bauska, Ogre, Cēsis and Limbaži. The area of the district was 3,058 km² with a population of 159,247 in January 2009. Riga district was one of the largest regions of Latvia, it was strategically important and also had some of the most developed infrastructure in Latvia. It was a cross-point of 10 major motorways and a junction of 6 important railroad lines.

Districts were eliminated during the administrative-territorial reform in 2009.

== History ==
One of the first ancient settlements was situated in this district and dates from the 9th century BC. Across time localities of the Riga district had their resurgence and downturns caused by wars and unrest. This land been occupied by German crusaders and Swedish, Polish–Lithuanian, Saxonian, German and Russian armies. More than 300 monuments of cultural and historical significance that are on the list of cultural heritage protection tell us about the most important events of local history. The reasons for the rapid development of Riga district can be found in its geographic position, human and natural resources, and rich heritage of culture and history. For the same reasons this region is valuable for tourism, recreation and business travel.

== Subdivisions (2008) ==
=== Cities/towns ===
- Riga (exterritorial center)
- Baldone
- Baloži
- Olaine
- Salaspils with rural territory
- Saulkrasti with rural territory
- Sigulda
- Vangaži

=== Municipalities (former parishes) ===
- Ādaži Municipality
- Baldone Municipality
  - Baldone
  - Baldone Parish
- Carnikava Municipality
- Garkalne Municipality
- Inčukalns Municipality
  - Vangaži
  - Inčukalns Parish
- Krimulda Municipality
  - Krimulda Parish
  - Lēdurga Parish
- Mārupe Municipality
- Ropaži Municipality
- Sēja Municipality
- Sigulda Municipality
  - Sigulda
  - Allaži Parish
  - More Parish
  - Sigulda Parish
- Stopiņi Municipality

=== Parishes ===
- Babīte Parish
- Daugmale Parish
- Ķekava Parish
- Mālpils Parish
- Olaine Parish
- Sala Parish

== Nature ==
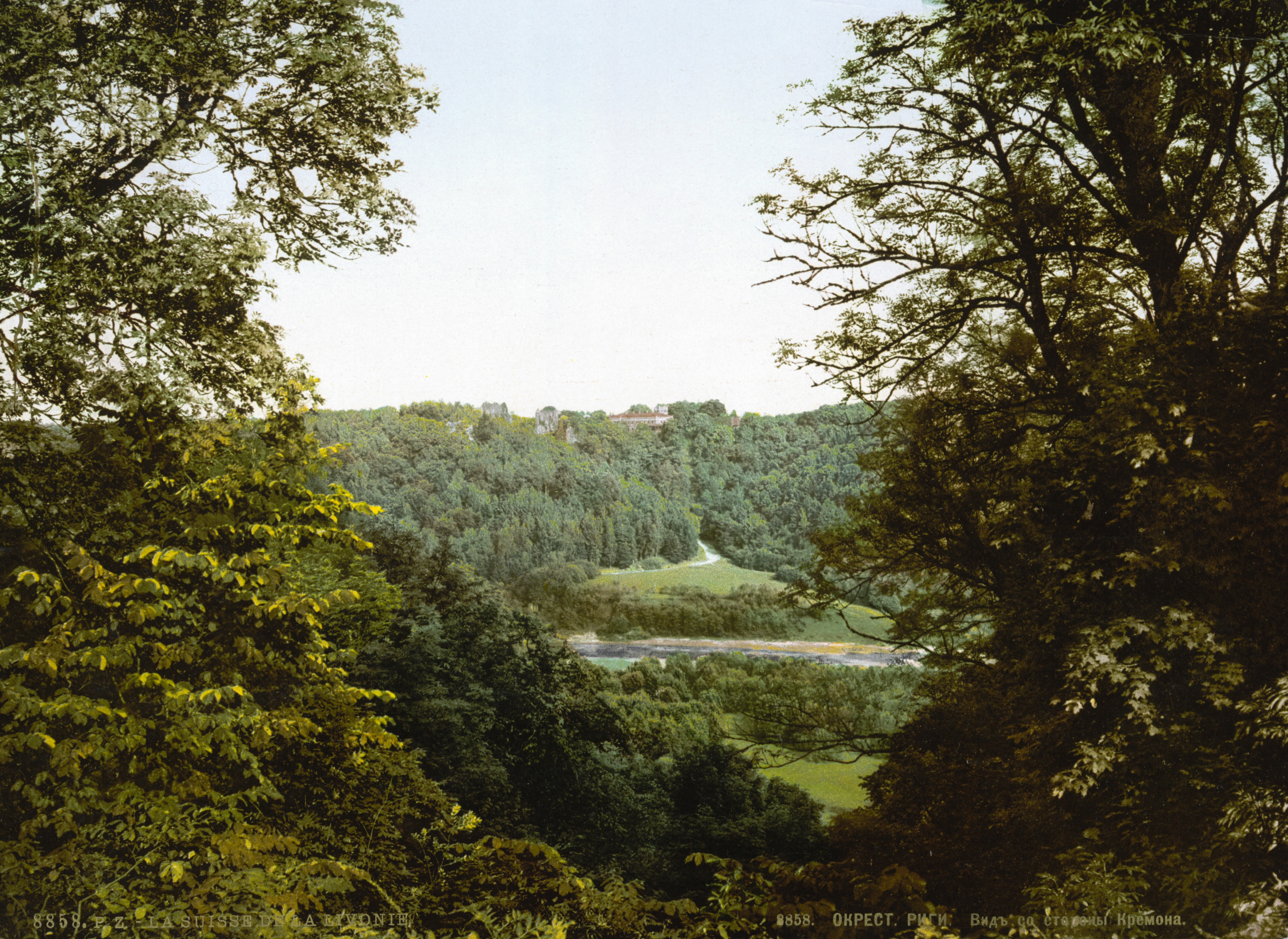
Postcard view from Sigulda.

The larger part of the former region lies in the sand-soil plains of Riga that are covered by pinewoods, low links, marshlands and level countryside that is typical for littoral lowlands. In the northern part, there are ridges of links and many lakes have formed in hollows between them. There are 132 lakes in the Riga Region and the biggest of them is the Babīte Lake, Lielais Baltezers, Mazais Baltezers, Dūņu Lake and Lilaste Lake. The former district is also crossed by three major rivers in Latvia – Daugava, Lielupe and Gauja Rivers.

The north-eastern part of former Riga district is covered by the largest deciduous forests in Latvia. The Gauja National Park is part of these forests and has more than 900 kinds of plants, 48 species of mammals and 149 species of birds.
