= Ogre district =

District of Latvia

Coordinates: 56°49′07″N 24°36′20″E

Ogre district Ogres rajons
- District
- Coat of arms

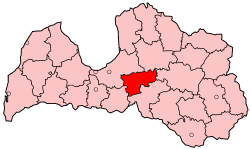
- Country: Latvia

Area
  - Total: 1,843 km^{2} (712 sq mi)

Population
  - Total: 63,027
  - Density: 34.20/km^{2} (88.57/sq mi)
- Website: ogre.lv/

The Ogre district (Latvian: Ogres rajons) was an administrative division of Latvia, located in the Semigallia and Vidzeme regions, in the country's centre. It was situated about 37 km east of the capital Riga. The principal city was Ogre with around 30 000 inhabitants.

Historically a part of Riga district, it was split off during the Soviet occupation of Latvia in 1947 and then introduced as a rajons in 1949. Districts were eliminated during the Latvian administrative-territorial reform in 2009.

== Cities and towns ==
- Ikšķile
- Ķegums
- Lielvārde
- Ogre
