= Riga county =

16th–20th century county in modern-day Latvia

Riga County: Rīgas apriņķis; Kreis Riga; Рижскій уѣздъ
- County
- Coat of arms

- Location within Latvia in 1940
- Country: Russian Empire; Latvia
- Russian Governorate: Livonia
- Established: 1566
- Abolished: 1949
- Capital: Riga (extraterritorial)

Area
  - Total: 6,113.10 km^{2} (2,360.28 sq mi)

Population (1897)
  - Total: 396,101
  - Density: 64.7954/km^{2} (167.819/sq mi)

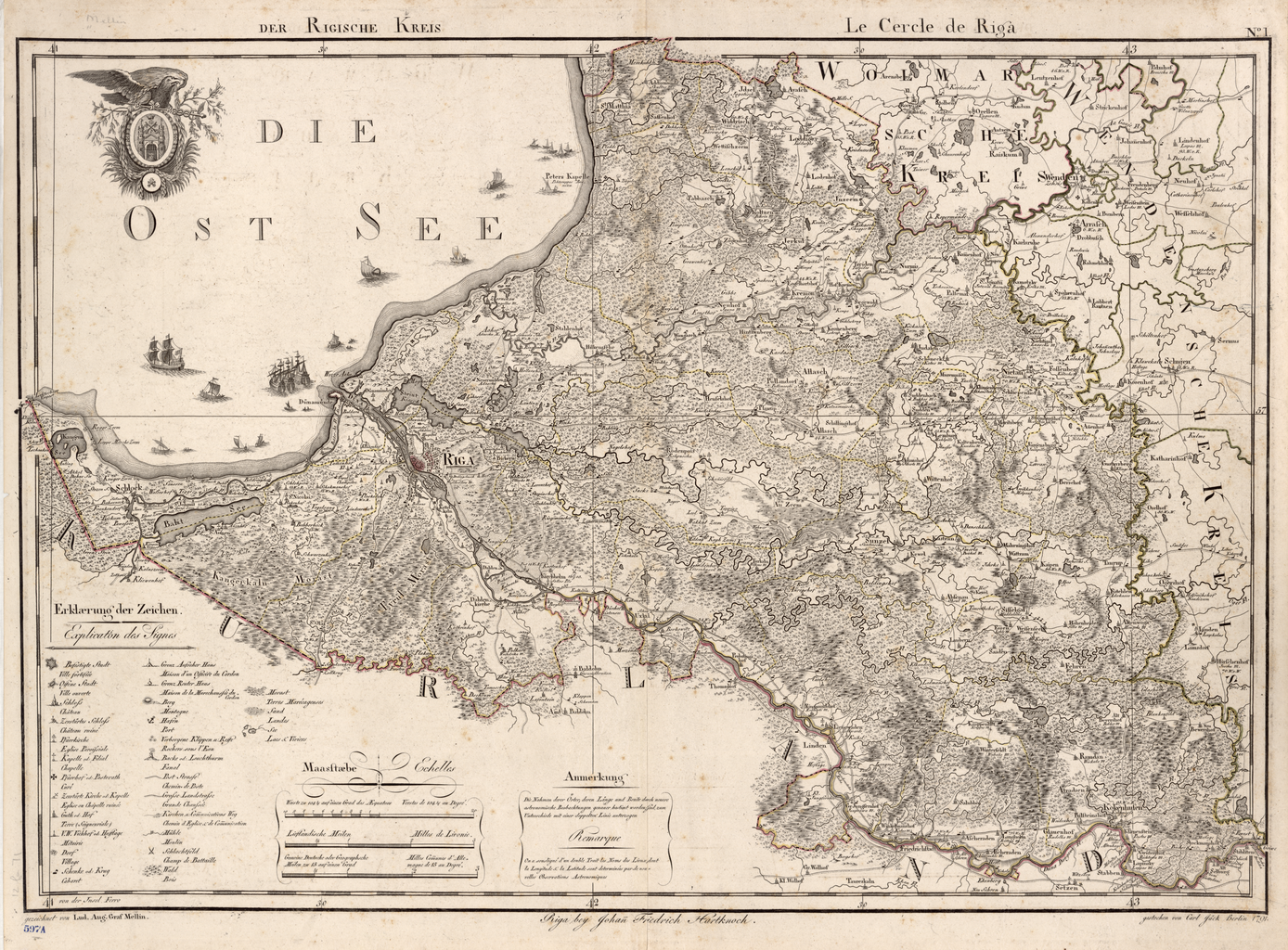
Rīgas apriņķis (Rigische Kreis) on the map of Ludwig August Mellin (1798)

Riga county (Latvian: Rīgas apriņķis, German: Kreis Riga, Russian: Рижскій уѣздъ, romanized: Rizhskiy uyezd) was a historic county of the Duchy of Livonia, the Governorate of Livonia, and the Republic of Latvia which was dissolved during the administrative territorial reform of the Latvian SSR in 1949.

== History ==
The first iteration of Riga County (distrikt) was formed in 1566 as a subdivision of the Duchy of Livonia of the Polish–Lithuanian Commonwealth. After the Treaty of Drohiczyn Riga county merged into the Wenden Voivodeship (Wenden Presidency until 1598) of Poland–LIthuania in 1582.

The County of Riga was later restored in 1629 as a subdivision of Swedish Vidzeme as a consequence of the Truce of Altmark. After the incorporation of Livonia by the Russian Empire in 1721, it became one of the nine subdivisions of the Governorate of Livonia. Its capital was Riga, which was the capital of the governorate as well.

After the establishment of the Republic of Latvia in 1918, the Rīgas apriņķis was expanded in 1924 with parts of Bauska county (Baldone Parish, Līve-Bramberga Parish, Tome Parish) and Linde Parish of Jaunjelgava county. The city of Riga (Rīgas pilsēta) was considered as a separate first-level municipality.

In 1949, during the Soviet occupation, the Council of Ministers of the Latvian SSR abolished counties and split the Rīgas apriņķis into of Riga, Baldone (dissolved in 1959), Saulkrasti (dissolved in 1956) and Sigulda districts (dissolved in 1962). The city of Riga remained as a separate "city of republican significance" (Latvian: republikas nozīmes pilsēta).

== Demographics ==
At the time of the Russian Empire Census of 1897, County of Riga (Kreis Riga) had a population of 396,101. Of these, 58.2% spoke Latvian, 18.2% German, 11.9% Russian, 4.7% Yiddish, 3.5% Polish, 1.6% Lithuanian, 1.1% Estonian, 0.2% Belarusian, 0.1% Tatar, 0.1% Ukrainian, 0.1% English and 0.1% French as their native language.
