= Valka district =

District of Latvia

Coordinates: 57°46′30″N 26°00′36″E

- District
- Coat of arms

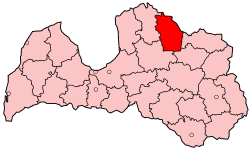
- Country: Latvia

Area
  - Total: 2,440 km^{2} (940 sq mi)

Population
  - Total: 31,314
  - Density: 12.8/km^{2} (33.2/sq mi)
- Website: valka.lv/

Valka district (Latvian: Valkas rajons) was an administrative division of Latvia, located in Vidzeme region, in the country's north-east. The district's area was 2441 km^{2}. The population was 31,314 inhabitants in 2008. The district contained 4 towns and 17 parishes. The towns are: Valka (6459), Smiltene (5996), Strenči (1474), and Seda (1692).

Districts were eliminated during the administrative-territorial reform in 2009.
