= Cēsis county =

16th–20th century county in Latvia

Cēsis County: Cēsu apriņķis (Latvian); Kreis Wenden (German); Венденскій уѣздъ (Russian)
- County
- Map in 1940
- Country: Russian Empire; Latvia
- Russian Governorate: Livonia
- Established: 1745
- Abolished: 1949
- Capital: Cēsis (Wenden)

Area
  - Total: 5,637.61 km^{2} (2,176.69 sq mi)

Population (1897)
  - Total: 124,208
  - Density: 22.0320/km^{2} (57.0627/sq mi)

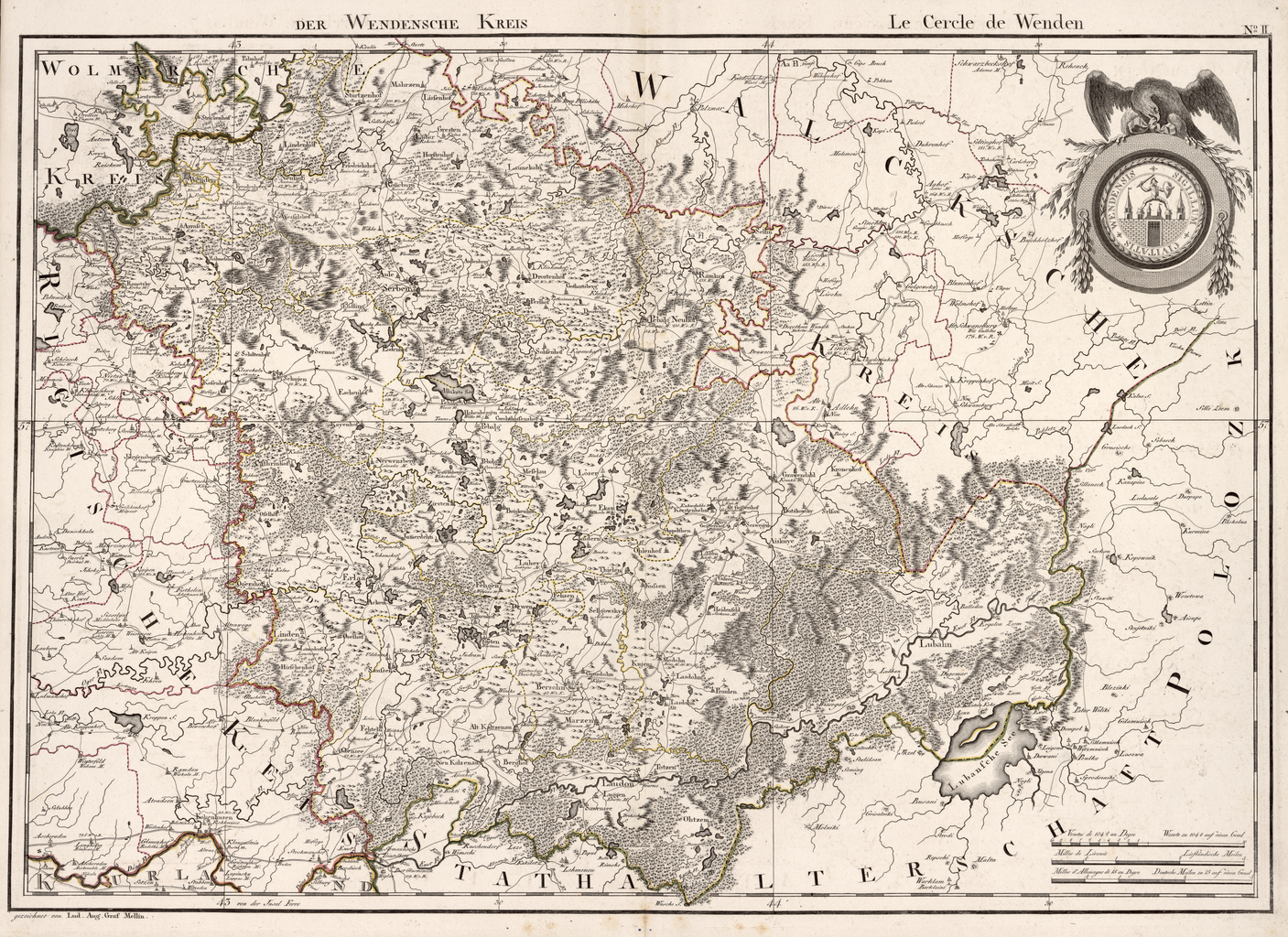
Cēsu apriņķis (Wendensche Kreis) on the map of Ludwig August Mellin (1798).

Cēsis county (Latvian: Cēsu apriņķis, German: Kreis Wenden, Russian: Венденский уезд) was a historic county in the Swedish Livonia, in the Governorate of Livonia, and in the Republic of Latvia dissolved during the administrative territorial reform of the Latvian SSR in 1949. Its capital was Cēsis (Wenden).

== History ==
First created as the Wenden Voivodeship in 1598, it was transformed into Kreis Wenden of Swedish Livonia in 1629. After the Treaty of Nystad it was incorporated in the Russian Empire and became one of the nine subdivisions of the Riga Viceroyalty (German: Rigasche Statthalterschaft – Stadtholdership of Riga) in 1783 and of the Governorate of Livonia in 1796. The district ran its own internal postal service from 1863 to 1903.

After the establishment of the Republic of Latvia in 1918, the Cēsu apriņķis existed until 1949, when the Council of Ministers of the Latvian SSR split it into the newly created districts (rajons) of Cēsis, Ērgļi (dissolved in 1959), Gaujiena (dissolved in 1956) and Smiltene (dissolved in 1959).

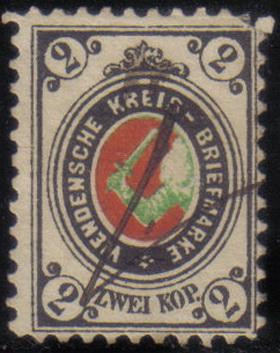
1880 postage stamp.

== Demographics ==
At the time of the Russian Empire Census of 1897, Kreis Wenden had a population of 124,208. Of these, 94.3% spoke Latvian, 3.5% German, 1.0% Russian, 0.6% Yiddish, 0.2% Polish, 0.2% Estonian and 0.1% Romani as their native language.
