= 2017 Latvian municipal elections =

Municipal elections were held across Latvia on 3 June 2017. All 119 municipalities and republican cities of Latvia elected their city councils. In Riga the joint list of the Social Democratic Party "Harmony" and Honor to serve Riga won a majority.

== Results ==
The following map shows the results of the local elections in different territories of Latvia. The colour, which each territory has, indicates the party, which received the majority of votes in this territory.

Results of the local elections in Latvia: Union of Greens and Farmers Latvian Farmers' Union Latvian Green Party Latvian Association of Regions National Alliance Unity Harmony Latvian Social Democratic Workers' Party New Conservative Party Regional parties

=== Riga ===
Party	Votes	%	Seats	+/–
Social Democratic Party "Harmony"–Honor to serve Riga	127,099	51.02	32	–7
Latvian Association of Regions–Latvian Development	34,176	13.72	9	+9
New Conservative Party	33,553	13.47	9	+9
National Alliance	23,135	9.29	6	–6
Unity	15,653	6.28	4	–5
Union of Greens and Farmers	8,249	3.31	0	0
Who Owns the State?	3,824	1.53	0	New
For Latvia From the Heart	1,517	0.61	0	New
All-Latvian Social Democratic Movement	799	0.32	0	New
Latvian Social Democratic Workers' Party	576	0.23	0	0
Eurosceptic Action Party	549	0.22	0	New
Total	249,130	100.00	60	0
Valid votes	249,130	99.61		
Invalid/blank votes	977	0.39		
Total votes	250,107	100.00		
Registered voters/turnout	426,505	58.64		
Source: Central Election Commission of Latvia

=== Daugavpils ===
Party	Votes	%	Seats	+/–
Latgale Party	7,899	28.88	6	+2
Social Democratic Party "Harmony"	7,786	28.47	5	+1
Our Party	5,347	19.55	4	+4
Honour to Serve Latvia	1,193	4.36	0	–
Latvian Russian Union	1,185	4.33	0	–
Alternative	1,095	4.00	0	–
Union of Greens and Farmers	1,058	3.87	0	–
For Latvia From the Heart	971	3.55	0	–
United for Latvia	295	1.08	0	–
Eurosceptic Action Party	271	0.99	0	–
For Latvia's Development	138	0.50	0	–
Christian Democratic Union	75	0.27	0	–
Unity	35	0.13	0	–
Total	27,348	100.00	15	–
Valid votes	27,348	98.91		
Invalid/blank votes	302	1.09		
Total votes	27,650	100.00		
Registered voters/turnout	58,483	47.28		
Source: Central Election Commission of Latvia

=== Liepāja ===
Party	Votes	%	Seats	+/–
Liepāja Party	7,279	31.61	6	–1
Latvian Association of Regions	6,787	29.47	5	New
Social Democratic Party "Harmony"	4,558	19.79	4	+1
National Alliance	885	3.84	0	–
In Liepāja Square	780	3.39	0	–
Justice National Union	740	3.21	0	–
New Conservative Party	728	3.16	0	–
Unity	607	2.64	0	–
Honour to Serve Latvia	430	1.87	0	–
For Latvia From the Heart	234	1.02	0	–
Total	23,028	100.00	15	–
Valid votes	23,028	98.91		
Invalid/blank votes	254	1.09		
Total votes	23,282	100.00		
Registered voters/turnout	45,856	50.77		
Source: Central Election Commission of Latvia

=== Jelgava ===
Party	Votes	%	Seats	+/–
Union of Greens and Farmers	7,097	41.97	7	+1
Social Democratic Party "Harmony"	3,352	19.82	3	0
National Alliance	2,023	11.96	2	0
Unity	1,546	9.14	1	–1
Latvian Association of Regions	1,443	8.53	1	New
Who Owns the State?	922	5.45	1	New
Honour to Serve Latvia	368	2.18	0	–
Socialist Party of Latvia	160	0.95	0	–
Total	16,911	100.00	15	–
Valid votes	16,911	98.98		
Invalid/blank votes	175	1.02		
Total votes	17,086	100.00		
Registered voters/turnout	39,447	43.31		
Source: Central Election Commission of Latvia
