= 2021 Latvian municipal elections =

Local elections in Latvia

Municipal elections were held across Latvia on 5 June 2021. This was the first election after the Saeima passed a municipal reform in 2020 that reduced the 110 municipalities and 9 cities to 43 municipalities, including 11 state cities and added 5 new Latvian towns: Ādaži, Iecava, Ķekava, Koknese, and Mārupe. In total, 645 councilors were elected to 40 municipal councils across the country. The 60 seats in the Riga City Council is not up for election until 2025, as snap elections were held in August 2020.

On 28 May, following the decision of the Constitutional Court of Latvia that declared a part of the municipal reform about the inclusion of Varakļāni Municipality into the new Rēzekne Municipality unconstitutional, the Central Election Commission (CEC) cancelled elections in the municipalities of both Rēzekne and Madona. The Saeima decided on 1 June to reverse the decision of the CEC and to move forward with the elections in Madona Municipality on 5 June as initially scheduled.

== Electoral system ==
All 645 councilors were elected using open-list proportional representation with a 5% electoral threshold. Seats are allocated using the Webster/Sainte-Laguë method. The number of councilors a given municipality were to elect was determined by the Central Election Commission based on the number of residents in that municipality.

Seat allocation for the 2021 local elections
Councilors	State Cities	Municipalities
13	50 000 residents or less	
15	more than 50 000 residents	30 000 residents or less
19		more than 30 000 residents
23		more than 60 000 residents

== Participating parties ==
Party		Main ideology	Political position	Lists	Municipalities (Note: Including the municipalities where the party runs on a joint list with another party)
New Conservative Party	JKP	Conservatism	Centre-right	29	33
National Alliance	NA	Nationalism	Right-wing	27	34
Harmony	S	Social democracy	Centre-left	26	26
New Unity	JV	Liberal conservatism	Centre-right	23	31
Association of Regions	LRA	Regionalism	Centre	20	29
Regional parties		Regionalism	Big tent	20	24
Who Owns the State?	KPV LV	Right-wing populism	Right-wing	20	20
For Latvia's Development	LA	Classical liberalism	Centre-right	18	25
Latvian Farmers' Union	LZS	Agrarianism	Centre-right	17	20
Union of Greens and Farmers	ZZS	Agrarianism, Green conservatism	Centre-right	17	18
Latvian Green Party	LZP	Green conservatism	Centre-right	14	17
Latvian Russian Union	LKS	Russian minority politics	Centre-left	11	11
The Progressives	P	Social democracy	Centre-left	8	10
Movement For!	Par!	Social liberalism	Centre-left	6	11
Social Democratic Workers' Party	LSDSP	Social democracy	Centre-left	6	6
Alternative	A			4	4
New Harmony	JS	Left-wing populism	Left-wing	4	4
For Stability!	S!	Populism	Centre	3	3
United for Latvia	VL	Populism	Centre	2	2
National Alliance "Justice"	NST	Ultranationalism	Far-right	2	2
For Latvia and Ventspils		Ventspils regionalism	Centre-right	1	1
Latvian Revival		National conservatism	Far-right	1	1
Liepāja Party		Liepāja regionalism	Centre-right	1	1
Christian Democratic Union	KDS	Christian democracy	Centre-right	1	1
Cooperation (Sadarbība)				1	1
Socialist Party	LSP	Socialism	Far-left	1	1
Growth	I	Centrism	Centre	0	1

== Results ==
=== Daugavpils ===
Party	Votes	%	Seats	+/–
Social Democratic Party "Harmony"	7,498	42.67	7	+2
Our Party	2,506	14.26	3	-1
Latgale Party, For Latvia's Development	2,351	13.38	2	-4
Daugavpils Municipality Party	1,711	9.74	2	New
Latvian Russian Union	1,458	8.30	1	+1
Alternative	721	4.10	0	0
Union of Greens and Farmers	512	2.91	0	0
Christian Democratic Union	404	2.30	0	0
New Conservative Party	227	1.29	0	New
New Harmony	184	1.05	0	New
Total	17,572	100.00	15	0
Valid votes	17,572	98.80		
Invalid/blank votes	214	1.20		
Total votes	17,786	100.00		
Registered voters/turnout	57,143	31.13		
Source: Central Election Commission of Latvia

=== Jelgava ===
Party	Votes	%	Seats	+/–
Union of Greens and Farmers	3,747	32.54	6	-1
New Unity	1,574	13.67	2	+1
National Alliance	1,450	12.59	2	0
Movement For!	1,205	10.46	2	New
Latvian Russian Union	946	8.21	1	New
Latvian Association of Regions	881	7.65	1	0
Social Democratic Party "Harmony"	813	7.06	1	-2
New Conservative Party	575	4.99	0	New
Who Owns the State?	220	1.91	0	-1
The Progressives	105	0.91	0	New
Total	11,516	100.00	15	0
Valid votes	11,516	99.07		
Invalid/blank votes	108	0.93		
Total votes	11,624	100.00		
Registered voters/turnout	39,284	29.59		
Source: Central Election Commission of Latvia

=== Jūrmala ===
Party	Votes	%	Seats	+/–
Union of Greens and Farmers	7,327	50.99	8	+2
National Alliance	1,692	11.77	2	0
Social Democratic Party "Harmony"	1,408	9.80	2	-1
For You, For Jūrmala	1,351	9.40	2	-1
New Unity, Movement For!	755	5.25	1	+1
The Progressives	641	4.46	0	0
For Latvia's Development	304	2.12	0	0
Jūrmala – Our Home	215	1.50	0	0
Latvian Russian Union	206	1.43	0	New
New Conservative Party	195	1.36	0	-1
Latvian Association of Regions	116	0.81	0	New
For Stability!	100	0.70	0	New
New Harmony	60	0.42	0	0
Total	14,370	100.00	15	0
Valid votes	14,370	99.13		
Invalid/blank votes	126	0.87		
Total votes	14,496	100.00		
Registered voters/turnout	36,748	39.45		
Source: Central Election Commission of Latvia

=== Liepāja ===
Party	Votes	%	Seats	+/–
Liepāja Party	5,519	41.47	6	0
Latvian Association of Regions	4,143	31.13	5	0
Social Democratic Party "Harmony"	1,583	11.90	2	-2
Movement For!, New Unity, The Progressives	806	6.06	1	New
National Alliance	676	5.08	1	+1
New Conservative Party	391	2.94	0	0
Association Residents	190	1.43	0	New
Total	13,308	100.00	15	0
Valid votes	13,308	99.22		
Invalid/blank votes	105	0.78		
Total votes	13,413	100.00		
Registered voters/turnout	46,506	28.84		
Source: Central Election Commission of Latvia

=== Rēzekne ===
Party	Votes	%	Seats	+/–
Social Democratic Party "Harmony"	4,387	63.94	8	-1
National Alliance, Latvian Green Party, New Unity, Latvian Association of Regions, Latgale Party	1,338	19.50	3	New
New Conservative Party	633	9.23	1	New
The Progressives	390	5.68	1	New
Association Residents	113	1.65	0	0
Total	6,861	100.00	13	0
Valid votes	6,861	98.66		
Invalid/blank votes	93	1.34		
Total votes	6,954	100.00		
Registered voters/turnout	22,273	31.22		
Source: Central Election Commission of Latvia

=== Ventspils ===
Party	Votes	%	Seats	+/–
For Latvia and Ventspils	4,562	54.92	7	-2
New Unity, Latvian Association of Regions	1,222	14.71	2	-2
For Latvia's Development	988	11.90	2	New
New Conservative Party	614	7.39	1	New
National Alliance	551	6.63	1	+1
Social Democratic Party "Harmony"	347	4.18	0	0
Alternative	22	0.26	0	0
Total	8,306	100.00	13	0
Valid votes	8,306	98.82		
Invalid/blank votes	99	1.18		
Total votes	8,405	100.00		
Registered voters/turnout	23,460	35.83		
Source: Central Election Commission of Latvia
