= For Latvia and Ventspils =

Latvian political party

For Latvia and Ventspils Latvijai un Ventspilij
- Chairman: Aivars Lembergs
- Founded: 10 March 1994; 32 years ago
- Headquarters: Ventspils, Raiņa iela 4a, LV-3601
- Ideology: Ventspils regionalism
- National affiliation: Union of Greens and Farmers
- Colours: Cyan; Yellow
- Ventspils City Council: 7 / 13
- Saeima: 2 / 100

Website
- latvijaiunventspilij.lv

For Latvia and Ventspils (Latvian: Latvijai un Ventspilij, LuV) is a regionalist political party in Latvia that mainly operates as a localist party in Ventspils. It is mostly known for its chairman, Aivars Lembergs, who has been mayor of Ventspils between 1988 until his arrest in 2021. In 2006, the party signed an agreement with the Union of Greens and Farmers to allow members of For Latvia and Ventspils to be elected to the Saeima, including the former speaker of the parliament Gundars Daudze, and current members Dana Reizniece-Ozola and Jānis Vucāns. Since then, Lembergs has been named as a candidate for the position of the prime minister many times.

== Election results ==
=== Ventspils local elections ===
Election	Party leader	Performance					Rank	Government
Election	Party leader	Votes	%	± pp	Seats	+/–	Rank	Government
1994	Aivars Lembergs	Unknown	100	New	11 / 11	New	1st	Full control
1997	Aivars Lembergs	Unknown	100	Steady	11 / 11	Steady	1st	Full control
2001	Aivars Lembergs	11,891	86,07	▼13,93	10 / 11	▼1	1st	Majority
2005	Aivars Lembergs	8,426	73,61	▼12,46	10 / 13	▼	1st	Majority
2009	Aivars Lembergs	7,685	59,96	▼13,65	8 / 13	▼2	1st	Majority
2013	Aivars Lembergs	7,214	69,44	▲4,17	9 / 13	▲1	1st	Majority
2017	Aivars Lembergs	7,167	62,13	▼7,31	9 / 13	Steady	1st	Majority
2021	Aivars Lembergs	4,562	54,32	▼7,81	7 / 13	▼2	1st	Supported majority (Note: Although LuV won 7 seats in the 2021 election, only 6 mandates were active due to Aivars Lembergs being unable to assume office while imprisoned. Jānis Vītoliņš was elected mayor with the support of NA.)
2025	Jānis Vītoliņš	4,355	47,15	▼7,17	7 / 13	Steady	1st	Majority

=== Legislative elections ===
Election	Party leader	Performance					Rank	Government
Election	Party leader	Votes	%	± pp	Seats	+/–	Rank	Government
2006	Aivars Lembergs	151,595	16.81 (ZZS (Note: ZZS list won 18 seats - 12 to LZS - 4 to LZP - 2 to LuV))	New	2 / 100	New	2nd	Coalition
2010	Aivars Lembergs	190,025	20.11 (ZZS (Note: ZZS list won 22 seats - 13 to LZS - 4 to LZP - 3 to LuV - 2 to LP))	▲3.30	3 / 100	▲1	▼3rd	Coalition
2011	Aivars Lembergs	111,957	12.33 (ZZS (Note: ZZS list won 13 seats - 5 to LZS - 4 to LZP - 2 to LuV - 1 to LP))	▼7.78	2 / 100	▼1	▼5th	Opposition
2014	Aivars Lembergs	178,210	19.66 (ZZS (Note: ZZS list won 21 seats - 11 to LZS - 4 to LZP - 3 to LuV - 3 to LP))	▲7.33	3 / 100	▲1	▲3rd	Coalition
2018	Aivars Lembergs	83,675	9.97 (ZZS (Note: ZZS list won 11 seats - 5 to LZS - 1 to LZP - 2 to LuV - 3 to LP))	▼9.69	2 / 100	▼1	▼6th	Opposition
2022	Aivars Lembergs	113,676	12.58 (ZZS (Note: ZZS list won 16 seats - 11 to LZS - 2 to LuV - 2 to LSDSP - 1 independent))	▲2.61	2 / 100	0	▲2nd	Opposition (2022-2023)
2022	Aivars Lembergs	113,676	12.58 (ZZS)	▲2.61	2 / 100	0	▲2nd	Coalition (2023-2026)
2022	Aivars Lembergs	113,676	12.58 (ZZS)	▲2.61	2 / 100	0	▲2nd	Coalition (2026)
2026	Aivars Lembergs	35,405	4.46 (ZZS (Note: ZZS list won 0 seats))	▼8.12	0 / 100	▼2	▼7th	Extra-parliamentary

=== European Parliament elections ===
Election	List leader	Votes	%	Seats	+/–	EP Group
2004 (Note: The ZZS list didn't win any seat)	Baiba Rivža	24,467	4.28 (#8)	0 / 9	New	–
2009	Baiba Rivža	29,463	3.79 (#10)	0 / 8	0	–
2014 (Note: The ZZS list won 1 seat, that went to LZS)	Andris Bērziņš	36,637	8.32 (#4)	0 / 8	0	–
2019	Dana Reizniece-Ozola	25,252	5.37 (#6)	0 / 8	0	–
2024	Harijs Rokpelnis	11,852	2.30 (#9)	0 / 9	0	–
