= First Kulbergs cabinet =

Government of Latvia, 2026

- 43rd Cabinet of Ministers of the Republic of Latvia

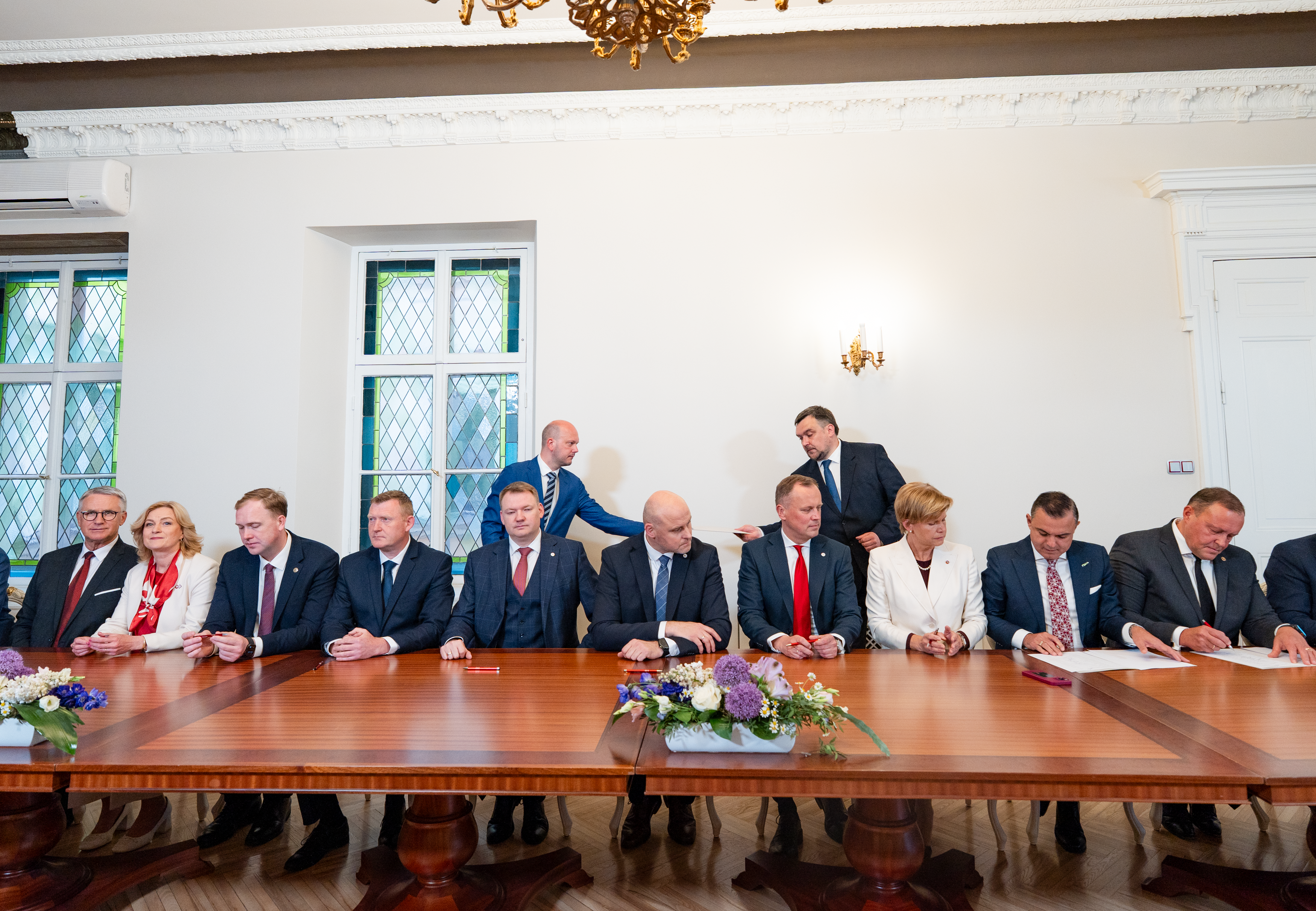
- Date formed: 28 May 2026
- Date dissolved: 17 November 2026

People and organisations
- Head of state: Edgars Rinkēvičs
- Head of government: Andris Kulbergs
- Member party: New Unity; Union of Greens and Farmers (Note: GKR MP Oļegs Burovs confirmed that his party will cooperate with ZZS in current Saeima, and support the new coalition government which includes ZZS.); United List; National Alliance
- Status in legislature: Majority (coalition) (May – November 2026); Caretaker government (November 2026)
- Opposition party: The Progressives; Latvia First
- Opposition leader: Andris Šuvajevs; Linda Liepiņa

History
- Election: 2022 Latvian parliamentary election
- Legislature term: 14th Saeima
- Predecessor: Siliņa cabinet
- Successor: Second Kulbergs cabinet

The first Andris Kulbergs cabinet (Latvian: Kulberga 1. Ministru kabinets) was the 43rd government of Latvia, sworn in on 28 May 2026 after Andris Kulbergs was proposed as Prime Minister by President Edgars Rinkēvičs and elected by the Saeima, with 66 votes "for". The government succeeded the Siliņa cabinet, led by Evika Siliņa, after latter resigned as Prime Minister, after Progressives withdrew support for the government after the party's defence minister, Andris Sprūds was forced to resign by Siliņa after multiple incidents involving stray drones suspected to be from Ukraine crossing into Latvian territory.

The government was a majority coalition between the New Unity, Union of Greens and Farmers, United List and National Alliance. It was succeeded by the Second Kulbergs cabinet on 17 November 2026, following the 2026 Latvian parliamentary election.

== Party breakdown ==
New Unity	4
United List	4
National Alliance	4
Union of Greens and Farmers	3

== Composition ==
Nr.	Office	Image	Incumbent	Took office	Left office	Party
	Prime Minister of Latvia Prime Minister of Latvia		Andris Kulbergs	28 May 2026	17 November 2026	United List
1.	Minister for Defence of Latvia Minister of Defence		Raivis Melnis	28 May 2026	17 November 2026	Independent (nominated by New Unity)
2.	Minister of Foreign Affairs		Baiba Braže	28 May 2026	17 November 2026	New Unity
3.	Minister of Economics		Viktors Valainis	28 May 2026	17 November 2026	Union of Greens and Farmers
4.	Minister of Finance		Māris Kučinskis	28 May 2026	17 November 2026	United List
5.	Minister of the Interior		Jānis Dombrava	28 May 2026	17 November 2026	National Alliance
6.	Minister of Education and Science		Ilze Indriksone	28 May 2026	17 November 2026	National Alliance
7.	Minister of Climate and Energy		Jānis Vitenbergs	28 May 2026	17 November 2026	National Alliance
8.	Minister of Culture		Nauris Puntulis	28 May 2026	17 November 2026	National Alliance
9.	Minister of Welfare		Reinis Uzulnieks	28 May 2026	13 September 2026 (Note: Removed from office after being caught driving under the influence of alcohol, Uldis Augulis designated as interim minister)	Union of Greens and Farmers
10.	Minister of Transport		Rihards Kozlovskis	28 May 2026	17 November 2026	New Unity
11.	Minister of Justice		Edvards Smiltēns	28 May 2026	3 November 2026	United List
12.	Minister of Health		Hosams Abu Meri	28 May 2026	17 November 2026	New Unity
13.	Minister of Smart Administration and Regional Development		Edgars Tavars	28 May 2026	17 November 2026	United List
14.	Minister of Agriculture		Uldis Augulis	28 May 2026	17 November 2026	Union of Greens and Farmers
