= Latvian Green Party =

Political party in Latvia

Latvian Green Party Latvijas Zaļā partija
- Abbreviation: LZP
- Chairman: Edgars Tavars
- Founder: Oļegs Batarevskis
- Founded: 13 January 1990; 36 years ago
- Headquarters: Skolas iela 3 (4 stāvs), 401 kab. LV-1010, Riga
- Membership (2017): 790
- Ideology: Green politics; Social conservatism; Social market economy
- Political position: Centre-right
- National affiliation: Union of Greens and Farmers (2002–2022); United List (2022–)
- European affiliation: European Greens (2003–2019)
- Colours: Green
- Saeima: 13 / 100
- European Parliament: 0 / 8
- Mayors: 3 / 43

Party flag
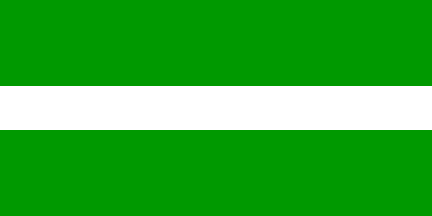

Website
- zp.lv

The Latvian Green Party (Latvian: Latvijas Zaļā partija, LZP) is a green conservative political party in Latvia.

Founded in 1990, the party was a member of the European Green Party from 2003 until its expulsion in 2019. It is positioned in the centre-right of the political spectrum and supports socially conservative and green policies. The party is notable for producing the world's first green head of government when Indulis Emsis briefly served as Prime Minister of Latvia in 2004 and the first green head of state when Raimonds Vējonis served as President of Latvia from 2015 to 2019.

== History ==
In April 1989, representatives from Green movements in multiple Baltic countries sent a letter to the Paris Green Congress citing the USSR as the reason for ecological ruin in the region. One of the representatives was Arvīds Ulme, a member of the Latvian Environmental Protection Club, who would go on to form the Latvian Green Party alongside Indulis Emsis the following year. The party was registered on 13 January 1990, becoming the first official political party in Latvia four months before it officially declared its independence from the Soviet Union.

The Supreme Council of the Republic of Latvia elected in 1990 contained seven Green delegates. After the Constitution of Latvia was restored, following the collapse of the Soviet Union, the election of the 5th Saeima (1993–1995) returned one Green deputy, Anna Seile, on the list of the Latvian National Independence Movement (LNNK). In the 6th Saeima (1995–1998), there were four members: Indulis Emsis, Guntis Eniņš, Jānis Kalviņš and Jānis Rāzna.

From 1993 until 1998, the Greens were part of the governing coalition with Indulis Emsis as Minister of State for Environmental Protection. The LZP contested the 1995 general election in an electoral list with the LNNK, but lost its parliamentary representation in the 1998 general election, which it contested in alliance with the Workers' Party and Christian Democratic Union.

For the 2002 parliamentary election, the party formed the Union of Greens and Farmers (ZZS) with the Latvian Farmers' Union. Three members of the Green party were elected: Indulis Emsis, Arvīds Ulme and Leopolds Ozoliņš. The ZZS joined a four-party center-right coalition government and was represented with three ministers, one of them from the Green party, Minister for the Environment Raimonds Vējonis.

In February 2004, after the breakdown of the four-party government, Indulis Emsis was appointed to form a new government and became the first head of government of a country anywhere in the world from a Green party. His minority government was forced to resign in December of the same year. A new coalition government led by the People's Party took office, in which the party was again represented as part of the ZZS.

For the 2006 parliamentary election, the party won four seats as part of the ZZS. The party remained part of the centre-right coalition government along with the People's Party, Latvia's First Party/Latvian Way, and For Fatherland and Freedom. Party chairman and former prime minister Indulis Emsis became Speaker of the Saeima from November 2006 until September 2007, when he resigned amid a criminal corruption investigation.

In 2015, Raimonds Vējonis was elected President of Latvia with the support of 55 out of 100 members of the Saeima, becoming the first ever head of state in Europe from a green party. On 7 May 2019, despite support from his party and coalition, Vējonis announced he would not seek re-election and he was succeeded by longtime judge of the European Court of Justice Egils Levits, who Vējonis had defeated in the 2015 election.

Leading politicians of the party have often supported nationalist and socially conservative views, leading to its expulsion from the European Green Party on 10 November 2019.

By 2022, however, ZZS was embroiled in internal turmoil, with the Green Party announcing that it sees no way of further cooperation in the framework of ZZS with For Latvia and Ventspils, still led by oligarch Aivars Lembergs. Ultimately, it voted to leave the alliance on 11 June 2022; they were later joined by the Liepāja Party. In May 2022, LZP formed a political alliance for the 2022 Saeima elections together with the Latvian Association of Regions, the Liepāja Party and the "United List of Latvia" NGO led by Liepāja construction contractor Uldis Pīlēns, the United List.

The United List won 15 seats in the 2022 election and joined the New Unity and National Alliance coalition as part of the second Krišjānis Kariņš government. On 14 August 2023, Kariņš resigned as prime minister after his coalition fell apart when the National Alliance, a national-conservative party, refused to allow the Union of Greens and Farmers and The Progressives, the only major left-wing party in Latvia, to join the coalition. From then and until 29 May 2026, the United List was part of the opposition to the Evika Siliņa government. Since 29 May 2026, United List is again part of the government, being the senior coalition partner in the Kulbergs cabinet.

== Ideology ==
Unlike most green parties in Europe, the Latvian Green Party holds socially conservative views, variously campaigning on right-wing populism, xenophobia, and homophobia. In 2003, party co-founder Arvīds Ulme co-authored a public letter in support of Aivars Garda, leader of the neo-fascist Latvian National Front, after he was charged for his homophobic rhetoric. Since its expulsion from the European Green Party in 2019, the Latvian Greens and its United List coalition partners have been associated with the soft Eurosceptic European Conservatives and Reformists Group.

The party platform states that their environmental goals are centered on sustainable development and they are aligned with Agenda 21.

== Election results ==
=== Legislative elections ===
Election	Party leader	Performance					Rank	Government
Election	Party leader	Votes	%	± pp	Seats	+/–	Rank	Government
1993	Oļegs Batarevskis	149,347	13.35 (LNNK (Note: LNNK list won 15 seats - 1 went to LZP))	New	1 / 100	New	2nd	Coalition
1995	Oļegs Batarevskis	60,352	6.35 (NKP-ZP (Note: NKP-ZP list won 8 seats - 4 to NKP - 4 to ZP))	▼7.00	4 / 100	▲3	▼7th	Coalition
1998	Valdis Felsbergs	22,018	2.30 (DP-LKDS-ZP (Note: DP-LKDS-ZP list won 0 seats))	▼4.05	0 / 100	▼4	▼8th	Extra-parliamentary
2002	Viesturs Sileniekss	93,759	9.47 (ZZS (Note: ZZS list won 12 seats - 7 to LZS - 5 to LZP))	▲7.17	5 / 100	▲5	▲5th	Coalition
2006	Raimonds Vējonis	151,595	16.81 (ZZS (Note: ZZS list won 18 seats - 12 to LZS - 4 to LZP - 2 to LuV))	▲7.34	4 / 100	▼1	▲2nd	Coalition
2010	Raimonds Vējonis	190,025	20.11 (ZZS (Note: ZZS list won 22 seats - 13 to LZS - 4 to LZP - 3 to LuV - 2 to LP))	▲3.30	4 / 100	0	▼3rd	Coalition
2011	Raimonds Vējonis	111,957	12.33 (ZZS (Note: ZZS list won 13 seats - 5 to LZS - 4 to LZP - 2 to LuV - 1 to LP))	▼7.78	4 / 100	0	▼5th	Opposition
2014	Edgars Tavars	178,210	19.66 (ZZS (Note: ZZS list won 21 seats - 11 to LZS - 4 to LZP - 3 to LuV - 3 to LP))	▲7.33	4 / 100	0	▲3rd	Coalition
2018	Edgars Tavars	83,675	9.97 (ZZS (Note: ZZS list won 11 seats - 5 to LZS - 1 to LZP - 2 to LuV - 3 to LP))	▼9.69	1 / 100	▼3	▼6th	Opposition
2022	Edgars Tavars	100,631	11.14 (AS (Note: AS list won 15 seats - 7 to LRA - 4 to LZP - 1 to LP - 3 to independents))	▲1.17	4 / 100	▲3	▲3rd	Coalition (2022–2023)
2022	Edgars Tavars	100,631	11.14 (AS)	▲1.17	4 / 100	▲3	▲3rd	Opposition (2023-2026)
2022	Edgars Tavars	100,631	11.14 (AS)	▲1.17	4 / 100	▲3	▲3rd	Coalition (from 2026)
2026	Edgars Tavars	283,892	35.76 (AS (Note: AS list won 41 seats - 18 to LRA - 13 to LZP - 3 to LP - 1 to Izaugsme - 6 to independents))	▲24.62	13 / 100	▲9	▲2nd	TBA

=== European Parliament elections ===
Election	List leader	Votes	%	Seats	+/–	EP Group
2014 (Note: The ZZS list won 1 seat, that went to LZS)	Andris Bērziņš	36,637	8.32 (#4)	0 / 8	New	–
2019 (Note: The ZZS list didn't win any seat)	Dana Reizniece-Ozola	25,252	5.37 (#6)	0 / 8	0	–
2024 (Note: The AS list won 1 seat, that went to an independent)	Reinis Pozņaks	42,551	8.27 (#4)	0 / 9	0	–

== Chairpersons ==
Three co-chairpersons share the leadership position at any one time. Former chairpersons of the Latvian Green Party include:

- Oļegs Batarevskis (1990–1997)
- Valts Vilnītis (1990–1991)
- Juris Zvirgzds (1990–1995)
- Gunārs Lākutis (1991–1993)
- Pēteris Jansons (1993–1994)
- Jānis Kalviņš (1994–1995)
- Indulis Emsis (from 1995)
- Rūta Bendere (1995–1996)
- Askolds Kļaviņš (1996–2001)
- Valdis Felsbergs (1997–2003)
- Viesturs Silenieks (2001–2011)
- Raimonds Vējonis (2003–2011)
- Edgars Tavars (from 2011)

== Local Government — Talsi County Council Chair (February 2024) ==
On 13 February 2024, Andis Āboliņš, a member of the Latvian Green Party, was elected as the new chairman of Talsi County Council. He secured 11 out of 19 deputy votes. Notably, Āboliņš had previously been affiliated with the National Alliance before joining LZP.

== Municipal Success — Jēkabpils Local Elections (June 2025) ==
In the 2025 local elections held in June, LZP achieved notable gains in Jēkabpils municipality. The party received 29.15% of the vote and secured 7 seats, up from 4 in the previous council — a clear sign of increasing support.

== See also ==
- Green party
- Green politics
- List of environmental organizations
- Politics of Latvia
