= 1998 Latvian parliamentary election =

Parliamentary election held in Latvia

← 1995	3 October 1998	2002 →
- All 100 seats in the Saeima; 51 seats needed for a majority
- Turnout: 71.00% ▼ (0.65 pp)
Party	Leader	Vote %	Seats	+/–
TP	Andris Šķēle	21.30	24	New
LC	Vilis Krištopans	18.15	21	+4
TB/LNNK	Guntars Krasts	14.73	17	+3
TSP	Jānis Jurkāns	14.20	16	+10
LSDA	Jānis Ādamsons	12.88	14	+14
JP	Raimonds Pauls	7.35	8	New
This lists parties that won seats. See the complete results below.
Results by district
Prime Minister before	Prime Minister after
Guntars Krasts; TB/LNNK	Vilis Krištopans; Latvian Way

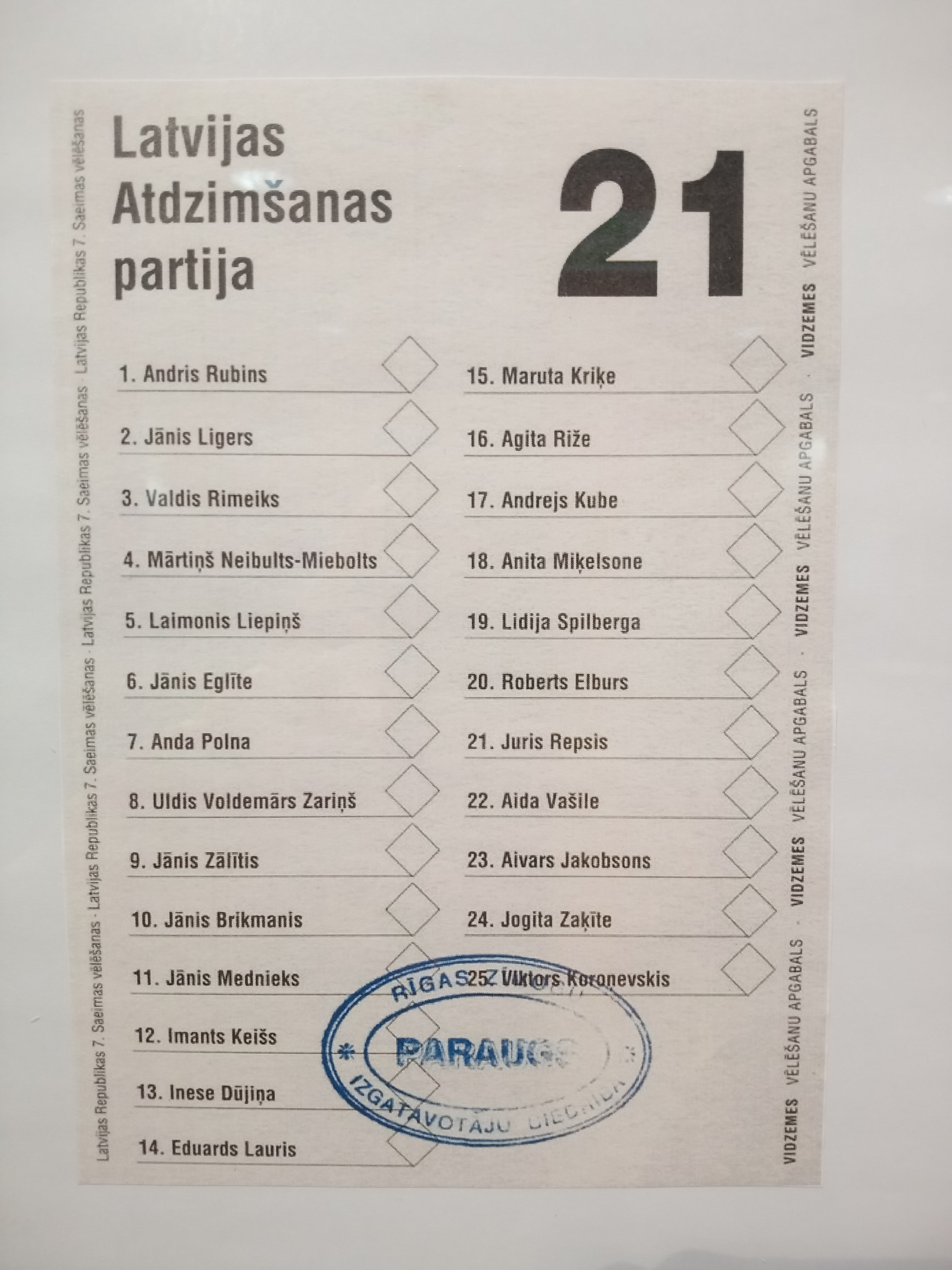
Example of ballot paper

Parliamentary elections were held in Latvia on 3 October 1998. The People's Party emerged as the largest party in the Saeima, winning 24 of the 100 seats.

== Results ==
Party	Votes	%	Seats	+/–
People's Party	203,585	21.30	24	New
Latvian Way	173,420	18.15	21	+4
For Fatherland and Freedom/LNNK	140,773	14.73	17	+3
National Harmony Party	135,700	14.20	16	+10
Latvian Social Democratic Alliance	123,056	12.88	14	+14
New Party	70,214	7.35	8	New
Latvian Farmers' Union	23,732	2.48	0	–
Workers' Party–LKDS–ZP	22,018	2.30	0	–
People's Movement for Latvia	16,647	1.74	0	–16
Democratic Party "Saimnieks"	15,410	1.61	0	–18
Latvian Revival Party	5,000	0.52	0	New
National Progress Party	4,522	0.47	0	New
Latvian Unity Party	4,445	0.47	0	–8
Social Democratic Women's Organisation	3,133	0.33	0	New
Popular Movement "Freedom"	3,099	0.32	0	New
Latvian National Democratic Party	2,927	0.31	0	0
Conservative Party	2,318	0.24	0	New
Citizens' Union "Our Land"	2,238	0.23	0	New
Helsinki-86	2,088	0.22	0	New
Democrats' Party	792	0.08	0	0
Latvian National Reform Party	464	0.05	0	New
Total	955,581	100.00	100	0
Valid votes	955,581	97.27		
Invalid/blank votes	26,819	2.73		
Total votes	982,400	100.00		
Registered voters/turnout	1,383,661	71.00		
Source: Nohlen & Stöver

== Aftermath ==
Initially, a coalition government was formed between Latvian Way, For Fatherland and Freedom, the Social Democratic Alliance and the New Party. This enjoyed a parliamentary majority with 60 out of the 100 MPs. However, within six months of the coalition forming, the Social Democratic Alliance left the government, leaving it with just 46 MPs, wiping out its parliamentary majority. As a result, a new government was formed with the addition of the People's Party. This enjoyed a large parliamentary majority, with 70 out of the 100 MPs.
