= Iveta Grigule-Pēterse =

Latvian politician (born 1964)

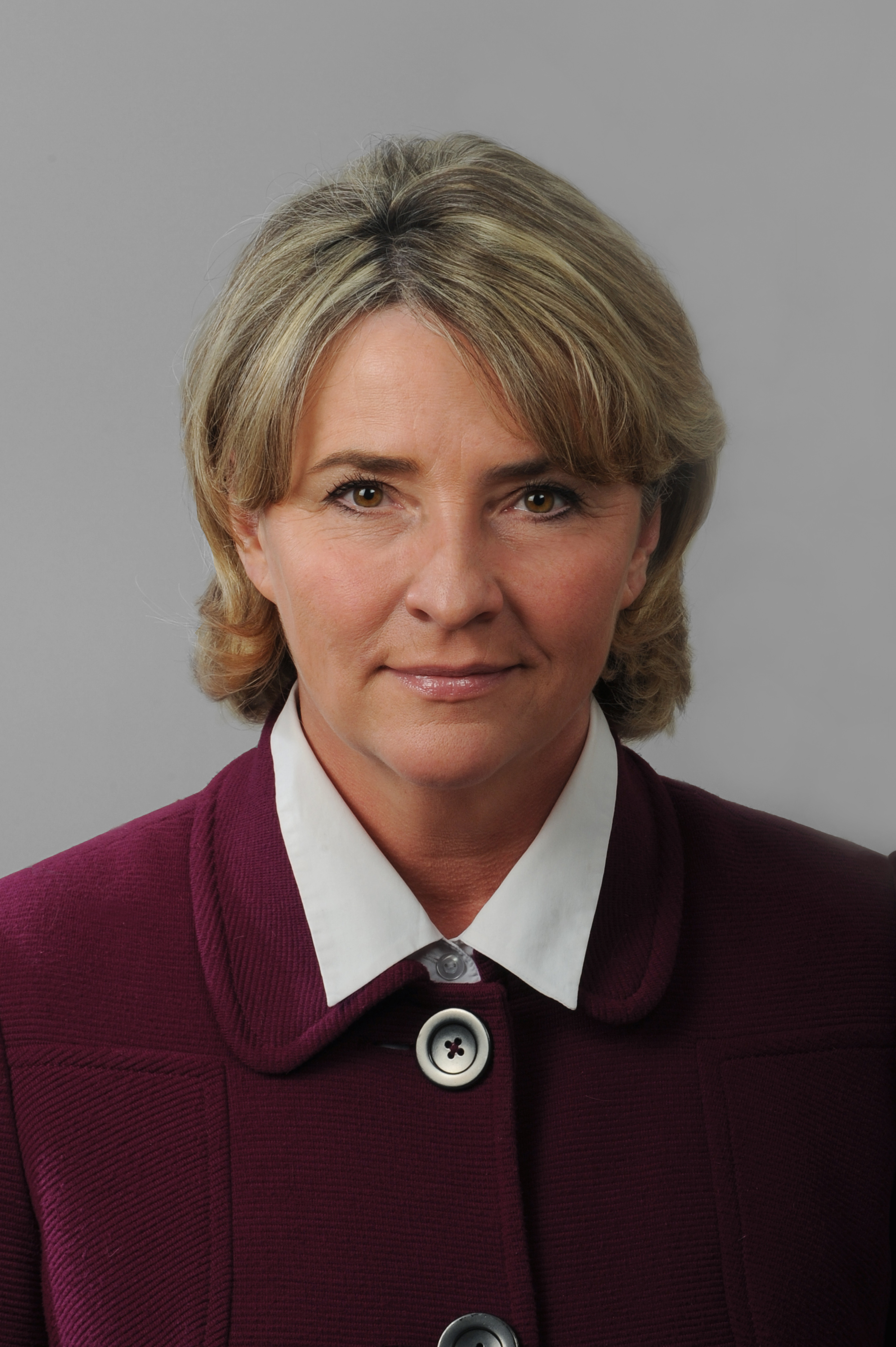

Member of the European Parliament for Latvia
- In office 1 July 2014 – 2019

Personal details
- Born: 30 September 1964 (age 62) Riga, Latvia
- Party: Latvian Green Party (2005–2011); Latvian Farmers' Union (2013–2017)
- Spouse: Romāns Mežeckis (1987–1996) Eric Peeters (2017–present)
- Relations: Married
- Education: Latvian Academy of Culture; University of Latvia
- Occupation: cultural worker

Iveta Grigule-Pēterse (born 30 September 1964) is a Latvian politician formerly for the Latvian Farmers' Union (until 2017). She was elected to the European Parliament in 2014 as the sole representative for the Union of Greens and Farmers.

She was formerly a member of the Latvian Green Party and was elected to the Saeima in 2010 for the Union of Greens and Farmers. She was excluded from the Green Party in 2011 but successfully ran as an independent for the Union of Greens and Farmers in the 2011 Latvian parliamentary election. In 2013, she joined the Latvian Farmers' Union.

She opposed the Latvian adoption of the Euro in January 2014.

In February 2017 Grigule left the Latvian Farmers' Union.

== Member of the European Parliament ==
She was elected to the European Parliament in the May 2014 elections, and joined the eurosceptic Europe of Freedom and Democracy group, which soon thereafter became the Europe of Freedom and Direct Democracy group. On 16 October 2014 it was reported that Grigule was defecting to the European People's Party, leading to the crisis in the EFDD group as it was temporarily one country short of the required seven member states. Nigel Farage, EFDD co-president and head of UKIP (whose members made up more than half the group), claimed that Grigule was pressured to stand down if she wanted to lead a parliamentary delegation to Kazakhstan. In April 2015 she joined the Alliance of Liberals and Democrats group.

In 2016 Grigule voted against a European Parliament resolution to condemn Russia's use of propaganda. The move was harshly criticised by Prime minister Māris Kučinskis who categorically distanced himself from it and said that "she has crossed all the boundaries that were there to cross," and that "the party board is prepared to have Grigule leave". Initially she refused to publicly explain her voting record, but after meeting with the Latvian Farmers' Union chairman Valdis Veinbergs Grigule claimed that she had voted against the resolution because she believed it popularized Islam. Veinbergs called her a valuable contribution to the party and assured that as long as he's chairman Grigule won't be kicked out from the party.

In November 2016 the Baltic Centre for Investigative Journalism Re:Baltica reported that Grigule and another Latvian MEP Andrejs Mamikins were circumventing the 2014 ban of hiring close relatives as assistants, with Grigule employing Mamikins' wife Natalya and Mamikins employing Grigule's daughter Anete. All four of them declined to comment, whether it was as a result of a mutual agreement.

In December 2017, according to the ranking website MEPRanking.eu, Grigule was ranked as the least effective Latvian MEP and one of the least effective members of the European Parliament in general, receiving 0.36 score units and ranking 736th out of 751.
