= SKG Alliance =

SKG Alliance Apvienība SKG
- Abbreviation: SKG
- Assembly of Representatives: Andrejs Požarnovs; Mareks Raups
- Founded: 7 March 2018
- Dissolved: 5 April 2019
- Merged into: Awakening
- Headquarters: Riga, Lāčplēša iela 60, LV-1011
- Ideology: Social democracy Christian democracy
- Political position: Big tent
- Member parties: Awakening For Latvia; Christian Democratic Union
- Colours: Maroon; Coral; Yellow

Website
- apvienibaskg.lv

The SKG Alliance (Latvian: Apvienība SKG) (registered as LSDSP/KDS/GKL) was an association of political parties established on March 28, 2018, which consisted of the Latvian Social Democratic Workers' Party, Honor to Serve Our Latvia and the Christian Democratic Union. It was reorganized in 2019.

== History ==
The highest decision-making body of the association was the Assembly of Representatives, which could decide on amendments to the statutes, cooperation with other political institutions and associations, as well as decide on other issues. One representative from each of the founding parties of the association - Jānis Dinevičs, Andrejs Požarnovs and Mareks Raups - was appointed as members of the Assembly of Representatives. The association participated in the 2018 Saeima elections, gaining only 0.21% of the vote and not overcoming the 5% barrier. On March 13, 2019, after the party From the Heart of Latvia (NSL) joined it, SKG changed its name to "Awakening" (Latvian: Atmoda).

The inclusion of the LSDSP in the potential association "Atmoda LSDSP" was approved in the party's congress, but some of its members refused to accept it. In April 2019, the party leader Jānis Dinevičs informed the media that the LSDSP had not joined the association due to disagreements with its partners over the name of the association. In the next elections, the LSDSP ran separately.

On November 28, 2019, NSL merged with Honor to Serve Our Latvia, forming the party "Awakening For Latvia".

== "Awakening" alliance members ==
- Awakening For Latvia
- Christian Democratic Union

== Election results ==
=== Legislative elections ===
| Election | Party leader | Performance | | | | | Rank | Government |
| Election | Party leader | Votes | % | ± pp | Seats | +/– | Rank | Government |
|---|---|---|---|---|---|---|---|---|
| 2018 | Jānis Dinevičs | 1,735 | 0.21 | New | 0 / 100 | New | 15th | Extra-parliamentary |
