= Uldis Sesks =

Mayor of Liepāja, Latvia and a businessman and former auto racer

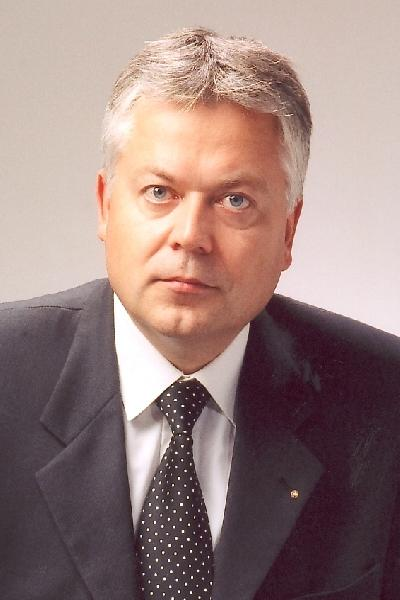
Uldis Sesks, Liepāja mayor

Uldis Sesks (born April 18, 1962, in Liepāja), is a former mayor of Liepāja, Latvia and a businessman and former auto racer.

== Career ==
Sesks is the Chairman of the Liepāja Special Economic Zone Authority, the Liepāja Party, the Liepāja Development Fund and a member of the Rotary Club. He studied at Liepāja School № 6. Sesks graduated from the Latvian Academy of Agriculture in Jelgava with a degree in mechanical engineering.

From 1986-1987, he was chief of the transport department of the kolkhoz Zelta zvaigzne (Golden Star). From 1987-1992, he was the vice-president of the board of the kolkhoz Zieds (Flower) in Vecpils. He improved his knowledge of entrepreneurship in Germany within a cooperation project with the North Rhine-Westphalia Chamber of Commerce.

In the 1980s, he was active in autosports. At the beginning of the 1990s, he established a private company "Autocentrs", which was later reorganized into "SD Autocentrs" and became the dealership of Volkswagen vehicles in Liepāja. He sold his share of the company in 2004.

In 1997, Sesks was elected the Chairman of the Liepāja City Council (Mayor) and re-elected to this position in 2001 and 2005. At the end of 2004, he established the Liepāja Party which has a cooperation agreement with the Union of Greens and Farmers.

He stepped down as mayor in November 2018, taking up a newly established vice-mayoral post.

He is married with two daughters, Baiba and Anete, and a son, Mārtiņš Nikijs, who competes as a driver in the World Rally Championship.
