= Latvian Farmers' Union =

Political party in Latvia

Latvian Farmers' Union Latvijas Zemnieku savienība
- Abbreviation: LZS
- Leader: Viktors Valainis
- Founder: Kārlis Ulmanis (1917); Jānis Kinna (1990)
- Founded: 12 December 1917; 108 years ago (original foundation) 5 July 1990; 36 years ago (re-established)
- Banned: 16 May 1934; 92 years ago
- Headquarters: Lielirbes iela 17a-29, Riga
- Membership (2017): 1,350
- Ideology: Agrarianism; Conservatism; Nationalism
- Political position: Centre to centre-right
- National affiliation: Union of Greens and Farmers
- European Parliament group: EFDD (2014); NI (2014–2015); ALDE Group (2015–2019)
- International affiliation: Green International (historical)
- Colours: Green; Yellow; Light green
- Saeima: 0 / 100
- European Parliament: 0 / 8
- Mayors: 7 / 43

Website
- lzs.lv

The Latvian Farmers' Union (Latvian: Latvijas Zemnieku savienība, LZS) is an agrarian political party in Latvia.

Initially formed in 1917 during the period of Latvian War of Independence (as Latviešu Zemnieku savienība), it was banned in 1934, which was notably done by its founder Kārlis Ulmanis. It was re-established in 1990. It is positioned in the centre on the political spectrum and it has expressed conservative and nationalistic rhetoric. Since 2002, the party has been a part of the Union of Greens and Farmers (ZZS). It was formerly a member of the Alliance of Liberals and Democrats for Europe.

== History ==
Founded in 1917, the party was the most influential conservative party in Latvia in the period from Independence in 1918 until the self-coup led by Kārlis Ulmanis in 1934, and the second most popular party overall after the Latvian Social Democratic Workers' Party. Ulmanis, who was a member of the party, banned all political parties after his coup, including the LZS. As Latvia was subsequently occupied during the course of the Second World War, the party was dormant until it reformed in 1990 when Latvia regained its independence. Immediately after the restoration of independence, there existed several groups competing at elections to claim the legacy of the pre-war LZS.

Since 2002 it has been part of the Union of Greens and Farmers (ZZS) coalition, which it formed along with the Latvian Green Party. The coalition also included the For Latvia and Ventspils and the Liepāja Party, who had cooperation agreements with the party allowing their members to be elected to the Saeima on the list of the Union of Greens and Farmers.

From 2014 to 2019 the party had one member of the European Parliament, Iveta Grigule, who ultimately sat with the Alliance of Liberals and Democrats group, having previously sat with the Europe of Freedom and Direct Democracy group and as a Non-Attached Member.

The Green Party and the Liepāja Party left the ZZS in June 2022, but were replaced by the Latvian Social Democratic Workers' Party.

== Election results ==
=== Legislative elections ===
Election	Party leader	Performance					Rank	Government
Election	Party leader	Votes	%	± pp	Seats	+/–	Rank	Government
1920	Kārlis Ulmanis	126,434	17.79	New	26 / 150	New	2nd	Coalition
1922	Kārlis Ulmanis	132,764	16.77	▼1.02	17 / 100	▼9	2nd	Coalition
1925	Kārlis Ulmanis	125,070	15.03	▼1.74	16 / 100	▼1	2nd	Coalition
1928	Kārlis Ulmanis	139,173	14.97	▼0.06	16 / 100	0	2nd	Coalition
1931	Kārlis Ulmanis	118,443	12.25	▼2.72	14 / 100	▼2	2nd	Coalition
Banned 1934-1990 under Ulmanis regime and the Latvian SSR
1993	Jānis Kinna	119,116	10.65	New	12 / 100	New	4th	Coalition
1995	Jānis Kinna	60,498	6.36 (LZS-KDS-LDP (Note: LZS-KDS-LDP list won 9 seats - 3 to LZS - 3 to KDS - 1 to LDP))	▼4.29	3 / 100	▼9	▼6th	Coalition
1998	Jānis Kinna	23,732	2.48	▼3.88	0 / 100	▼3	▼7th	Extra-parliamentary
2002	Augusts Brigmanis	93,759	9.47 (ZZS (Note: ZZS list won 12 seats - 7 to LZS - 5 to LZP))	▲6.99	7 / 100	▲7	▲5th	Coalition
2006	Augusts Brigmanis	151,595	16.81 (ZZS (Note: ZZS list won 18 seats - 12 to LZS - 4 to LZP - 2 to LuV))	▲7.34	12 / 100	▲5	▲2nd	Coalition
2010	Augusts Brigmanis	190,025	20.11 (ZZS (Note: ZZS list won 22 seats - 13 to LZS - 4 to LZP - 3 to LuV - 2 to LP))	▲3.30	13 / 100	▲1	▼3rd	Coalition
2011	Augusts Brigmanis	111,957	12.33 (ZZS (Note: ZZS list won 13 seats - 5 to LZS - 4 to LZP - 2 to LuV - 1 to LP))	▼7.78	5 / 100	▼8	▼5th	Opposition
2014	Augusts Brigmanis	178,210	19.66 (ZZS (Note: ZZS list won 21 seats - 11 to LZS - 4 to LZP - 3 to LuV - 3 to LP))	▲7.33	11 / 100	▲6	▲3rd	Coalition
2018	Augusts Brigmanis	83,675	9.97 (ZZS (Note: ZZS list won 11 seats - 5 to LZS - 1 to LZP - 2 to LuV - 3 to LP))	▼9.69	5 / 100	▼6	▼6th	Opposition
2022	Armands Krauze	113,676	12.58 (ZZS (Note: ZZS list won 16 seats - 11 to LZS - 2 to LuV - 2 to LSDSP - 1 independent))	▲2.61	11 / 100	▲6	▲2nd	Opposition (2022-2023)
2022	Armands Krauze	113,676	12.58 (ZZS)	▲2.61	11 / 100	▲6	▲2nd	Coalition
2026	Viktors Valainis	35,405	4.46 (ZZS (Note: ZZS list won 0 seats))	▼8.12	0 / 100	▼11	▼7th	Extra-parliamentary

=== European Parliament elections ===
Election	List leader	Votes	%	Seats	+/–	EP Group
2004 (Note: The ZZS list didn't win any seat)	Baiba Rivža	24,467	4.28 (#8)	0 / 9	New	–
2009	Baiba Rivža	29,463	3.79 (#10)	0 / 8	0	–
2014 (Note: The ZZS list won 1 seat, that went to LZS)	Andris Bērziņš	36,637	8.32 (#4)	1 / 8	▲1	EFDD (2014); NI (2014-2015); ALDE (2015-2019)
2019	Dana Reizniece-Ozola	25,252	5.37 (#6)	0 / 8	▼1	–
2024	Harijs Rokpelnis	11,852	2.30 (#9)	0 / 9	0	–

== Symbols and logos ==
Old logo
