= Workers' Party (Latvia) =

Latvian political party

The Workers' Party (Latvian: Darba partija, DP) was a political party in Latvia.

== History ==
The party was established in 1920 and won six seats in the Constitutional Assembly elections that year, becoming the joint fourth-largest party in the Assembly. For the 1922 elections it formed the Democratic Centre alliance with the Latvian People's Party, winning six seats. The two parties officially merged into the Democratic Centre the following year.

The party was re-established in 1997 and contested the 1998 elections in an alliance with the Christian Democratic Union and the Green Party, failing to win a seat. In the 2002 elections it was part of the Centre Alliance, but again failed to win a seat. It ceased to exist in 2008.
