= Union of Greens and Farmers =

Political alliance in Latvia

Union of Greens and Farmers Zaļo un Zemnieku savienība
- Abbreviation: ZZS
- Leader: Aivars Lembergs
- Chairman: Viktors Valainis
- Founded: 25 July 2002; 24 years ago
- Headquarters: Lielirbes iela 17a-30, Riga
- Membership (2017): 2,254
- Ideology: Agrarianism; Green conservatism; Economic nationalism; Soft Euroscepticism
- Political position: Centre
- Members: LZS; LSDSP; LuV; DNP
- Colours: Green; Yellow
- Saeima: 0 / 100
- European Parliament: 0 / 9
- Mayors: 11 / 43

Website
- zzs.lv
- Politics of Latvia; Political parties; Elections; A: The party is sometimes also described as a centre-right or a centre-left party.

The Union of Greens and Farmers (Latvian: Zaļo un Zemnieku savienība, ZZS) is an agrarian political alliance in Latvia. It is made up of the Latvian Farmers' Union, Latvian Social Democratic Workers' Party, and For Latvia and Ventspils.

It is positioned in the centre on the political spectrum, sometimes also described as a centre-right or a centre-left party. It is orientated towards agrarian, conservative, Eurosceptic, and green policies, and can be considered a centrist Nordic agrarian alliance, with nationalist and anti-liberal elements.

While the alliance's formal leader is Edgars Tavars, its leading figure and chief financial supporter is the oligarch Aivars Lembergs. The ZZS has had the world's first prime minister, Indulis Emsis (Prime Minister of Latvia in 2004), and first head of state, Raimonds Vējonis (President of Latvia 2015–19), to be affiliated with a green party.

== History ==
=== Foundation, participation in the government ===
The alliance was established to contest the 2002 parliamentary election by the Latvian Green Party (LZP) and Latvian Farmers' Union (LZS). It ran on an ideologically amorphous agenda and won 12 out of 100 seats in the parliament. In March 2004, Indulis Emsis from the LZP became the Prime Minister of Latvia until December of that year.

On a European level, the LZP cooperated with the European Green Party while the LZS has no formal affiliation. Before the 2004 European Parliament election, ZZS announced that if its representative was elected, he or she would join one of two political groups depending on which party they belonged to.

The alliance continued for the 2006 parliamentary election, and won 18 seats. It became part of the governing coalition, and LZP chairman Indulis Emsis, who served as Prime Minister briefly in 2004, became Speaker of the Saeima.

Aivars Lembergs was the candidate of the Union of Greens and Farmers for the position of Prime Minister in 2006, before being charged with corruption, fraud, bribery, money laundering and abuse of elected office on 20 July 2006. On 14 March 2007, Lembergs was detained by the Latvian authorities in relation to a criminal investigation.

At the 2014 European Parliament election, the ZZS won 8.3% of the vote and for the first time one of Latvia's European Parliament seats. Its MEP is Iveta Grigule who initially sat with the Europe of Freedom and Direct Democracy (EFFD) group. On 16 October 2014 Grigule defected from the EFDD to sit as an independent. This move required EFDD to co-opt a member of Poland's Congress of the New Right to remain eligible for parliamentary group status. In April 2015 she joined the Alliance of Liberals and Democrats for Europe (ALDE) group.

In the 2015 presidential election, the alliance's then-leader Raimonds Vējonis became President of Latvia and subsequently resigned his leadership of the alliance. In January 2016, after the resignation of Prime Minister Laimdota Straujuma, Liepāja Party member Māris Kučinskis became the head of government. After the 2018 Latvian parliamentary election, ZZS lost ten seats and ultimately in 2019 became a part of the opposition to the Kariņš cabinet. It stayed in opposition until 2023, when it became part of Evika Siliņa cabinet.

=== Split, change of members ===
In early 2022, the alliance started to break apart, with the Green Party announcing that it sees no way of further cooperation with For Latvia and Ventspils, still led by oligarch Aivars Lembergs, and ultimately on 11 June 2022 it voted to leave the alliance, later joined by the Liepāja Party. In July, the Greens and the Liepāja Party joined the Latvian Association of Regions and a political NGO led by construction contractor Uldis Pīlēns in forming the United List alliance.

The departing parties were replaced with the Latvian Social Democratic Workers' Party (LSDSP), a rival of the 1920s and 1930s, who joined ZZS on June 1 and allowed it to retain its name. The alliance once again announced Lembergs as their prime ministerial candidate. The list won 16 seats, with two going to LSDSP, who returned to the Saeima for the first time since 2002.

In 2026 Latvian parliamentary election the party got 4.46 per cent of the vote and was left without any members in Saeima.

== Ideology ==
The Union of Greens and Farmers is based on similar sentimental feelings shared by the voters of the two groups. Latvians are supportive of traditional small farms and perceive them as more environmentally friendly than large-scale farming: Nature is threatened by development, while small farms are threatened by large industrial-scale farms. For example, after the restoration of independence, Latvia broke down Soviet-era collective farms and returned land to its original owners (or their descendants). This perception has resulted in an alliance between green and farmer's parties, which is rare in other countries.

The alliance is Eurosceptic, although not opposed to Latvian membership of the European Union. The ZZS opposed the adoption of the euro by Latvia. The party opposes granting non-citizens Latvian citizenship or voting rights in local elections.

On social issues, the party has taken a traditionally conservative approach, opposing same-sex marriage and instead favouring civil unions for same-sex couples. It supports abortion rights for up to 12 weeks of pregnancy and has voted to ratify the Istanbul Convention for preventing violence against women, despite having initially expressed skepticism over the convention’s use of the term “gender” and potential redefinition of marriage outside of that of a union of a man and a woman. However, the party is also environmentalist and follows green politics, stressing the need for sustainable and ecological economic policy, reducing environmental waste and for a transitation away from fossil fuel energy sources, in favor of renewable energy.

Economically, the party is populist, adhering to the principles of economic nationalism. It is also opposed to economic liberalism in favor of more redistributive policies. It opposes spending cuts, especially to welfare, pensions and healthcare - instead, the party proposes to extend the Latvian safety net, and promotes popular welfare measures.

== Members ==
Name	Ideology	Position	Leader	Saeima	MEPs
Latvian Farmers' Union; Latvijas Zemnieku savienība	Agrarianism; Conservatism	Centre to centre-right	Armands Krauze	11 / 100	0 / 8
For Latvia and Ventspils (Note: Cooperation agreement with the alliance, not formal member); Latvijai un Ventspilij	Regionalism	Centre	Aivars Lembergs	2 / 100	0 / 8
Latvian Social Democratic Workers' Party; Latvijas Sociāldemokrātiskā Strādnieku Partija	Social democracy	Left-wing	Jānis Dinevičs	2 / 100	0 / 8
Independents				1 / 100	0 / 8

=== Former Members ===
Name	Ideology	Position	Leader	Time
Latvian Green Party; Latvijas Zaļā partija	Green politics; Social conservatism	Centre to centre-right	Edgars Tavars	2002–2022
Liepāja Party (Note: Cooperation agreement with the alliance, not formal member); Liepājas Partija	Localism	Centre-right	Uldis Sesks	2004–2022

== Election results ==
=== Legislative elections ===
View source data.

Election	Leader	Performance					Rank	Government
Election	Leader	Votes	%	± pp	Seats	+/–	Rank	Government
2002	Ingrīda Ūdre	93,759	9.47	New	12 / 100	New	5th	Coalition
2006	Aivars Lembergs	151,595	16.81	▲7.34	18 / 100	▲6	▲2nd	Coalition
2010	Aivars Lembergs	190,025	20.11	▲3.30	22 / 100	▲4	▼3rd	Coalition
2011	Raimonds Vējonis	111,957	12.33	▼7.78	13 / 100	▼9	▼5th	Opposition
2014	Raimonds Vējonis	178,210	19.66	▲7.33	21 / 100	▲8	▲3rd	Coalition
2018	Māris Kučinskis	83,675	9.97	▼9.69	11 / 100	▼10	▼6th	Opposition
2022	Aivars Lembergs	113,676	12.58	▲2.61	16 / 100	▲5	▲2nd	Opposition (2022-2023)
2022	Aivars Lembergs	113,676	12.58	▲2.61	16 / 100	▲5	▲2nd	Coalition (2023-2026)
2022	Aivars Lembergs	113,676	12.58	▲2.61	16 / 100	▲5	▲2nd	Coalition (2026)
2026	Viktors Valainis	35,405	4.46	▼8.12	0 / 100	▼16	▼7th	Extra-parliamentary

=== European Parliament elections ===
Election	List leader	Votes	%	Seats	+/–	EP Group
2004	Baiba Rivža	24,467	4.28 (#8)	0 / 8	New	–
2009	Baiba Rivža	29,463	3.79 (#10)	0 / 8	0	–
2014	Andris Bērziņš	36,637	8.32 (#4)	1 / 8	▲1	EFDD (2014); NI (2014-2015); ALDE (2015-2019)
2019	Dana Reizniece-Ozola	25,252	5.37 (#6)	0 / 8	▼1	–
2024	Harijs Rokpelnis	11,852	2.30 (#9)	0 / 8	0	–

== See also ==
- Lithuanian Farmers and Greens Union
