= Liepāja Party =

Latvian political party

Liepāja Party Liepājas Partija
- Chairman: Uldis Sesks
- Founded: December 14, 2004; 21 years ago
- Headquarters: Dīķa iela 11 - 2, LV-3401, Liepāja
- Membership (2016): 357
- Ideology: Localism
- Political position: Centre-right
- National affiliation: Union of Greens and Farmers (2004–2022); United List (since 2022)
- Colours: Green; White
- Liepāja City Council: 6 / 15
- Saeima: 3 / 100

Website
- liepajaspartija.lv

The Liepāja Party (Latvian: Liepājas Partija) is a localist political party in Latvia. It operates in the city of Liepāja, where its chairman, Uldis Sesks, was mayor from 1997 to 2018. The party has an agreement with the Union of Greens and Farmers allowing party members to be elected in the Saeima, including current members Māris Kučinskis (former Prime Minister of Latvia), Valdis Skujiņš and Aija Barča.

== Election results ==
=== Legislative elections ===
Election	Party leader	Performance					Rank	Government
Election	Party leader	Votes	%	± pp	Seats	+/–	Rank	Government
2010 (Note: ZZS list won 22 seats; 13 to LZS, 4 to LZP and 3 to LuV - 2 to LP)	Uldis Sesks	190,025	20.11	New	2 / 100	New	3rd	Coalition
2011 (Note: ZZS list won 13 seats; 5 to LZS, 4 to LZP and 2 to LuV - 1 to LP)	Uldis Sesks	111,957	12.33	▼7.78	1 / 100	▼1	▼5th	Opposition
2014 (Note: ZZS list won 21 seats; 11 to LZS, 4 to LZP and 3 to LuV - 3 to LP)	Uldis Sesks	178,210	19.66	▲7.33	3 / 100	▲2	▲3rd	Coalition
2018 (Note: ZZS list won 11 seats; 5 to LZS, 1 to LZP and 2 to LuV - 3 to LP)	Uldis Sesks	83,675	9.97	▼9.69	3 / 100	0	▼6th	Opposition
2022 (Note: AS list won 15 seats; 7 to LRA, 4 to LZP, 1 to LP and 3 to independents)	Uldis Sesks	100,631	11.14	▲1.17	1 / 100	▼2	▲3rd	Coalition (2022-2023)
2022	Uldis Sesks	100,631	11.14	▲1.17	1 / 100	▼2	▲3rd	Opposition (2023-)
2026 (Note: AS list won 41 seats; 18 to LRA, 13 to LZP, 3 to LP, 1 to Izaugsme and 6 to independents)	Uldis Sesks	283,892	35.76	▼24.62	3 / 100	▲2	▼8th	TBA

=== European Parliament elections ===
Election	List leader	Votes	%	Seats	+/–	EP Group
2014 (Note: The ZZS list won 1 seat, that went to LZS)	Andris Bērziņš	36,637	8.32 (#4)	0 / 8	New	–
2019 (Note: The ZZS list didn't win any seat)	Dana Reizniece-Ozola	25,252	5.37 (#6)	0 / 8	0	–
2024 (Note: The AS list won 1 seat, that went to an independent)	Reinis Pozņaks	42,551	8.27 (#4)	0 / 9	0	–
