= Harijs Rokpelnis =

Latvian politician (born 1987)

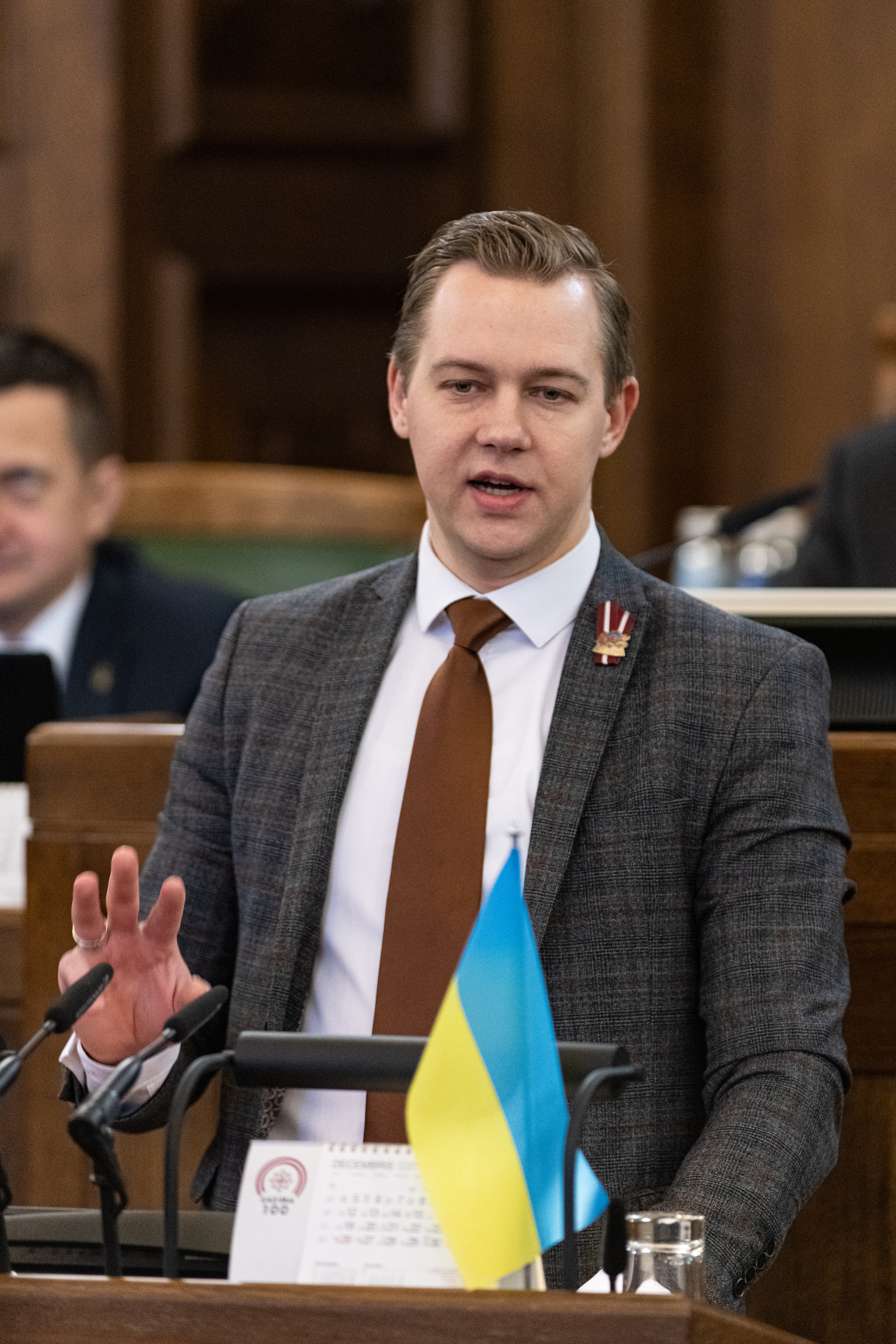
- Rokpelnis in 2022

Member of the Saeima
- Incumbent
- Assumed office 1 November 2022
- Constituency: Livonia

Personal details
- Born: 30 January 1987 (age 39)
- Party: Latvian Farmers' Union
- Education: Stockholm School of Economics in Riga

Harijs Rokpelnis (born 30 January 1987) is a Latvian politician of the Latvian Farmers' Union who was elected member of the Saeima in 2022. He was chairman of the municipal council of Mazsalaca from 2013 to 2021, and was the lead candidate of the Union of Greens and Farmers in the 2024 European Parliament election.
