= Aivars Lembergs =

Latvian politician and oligarch

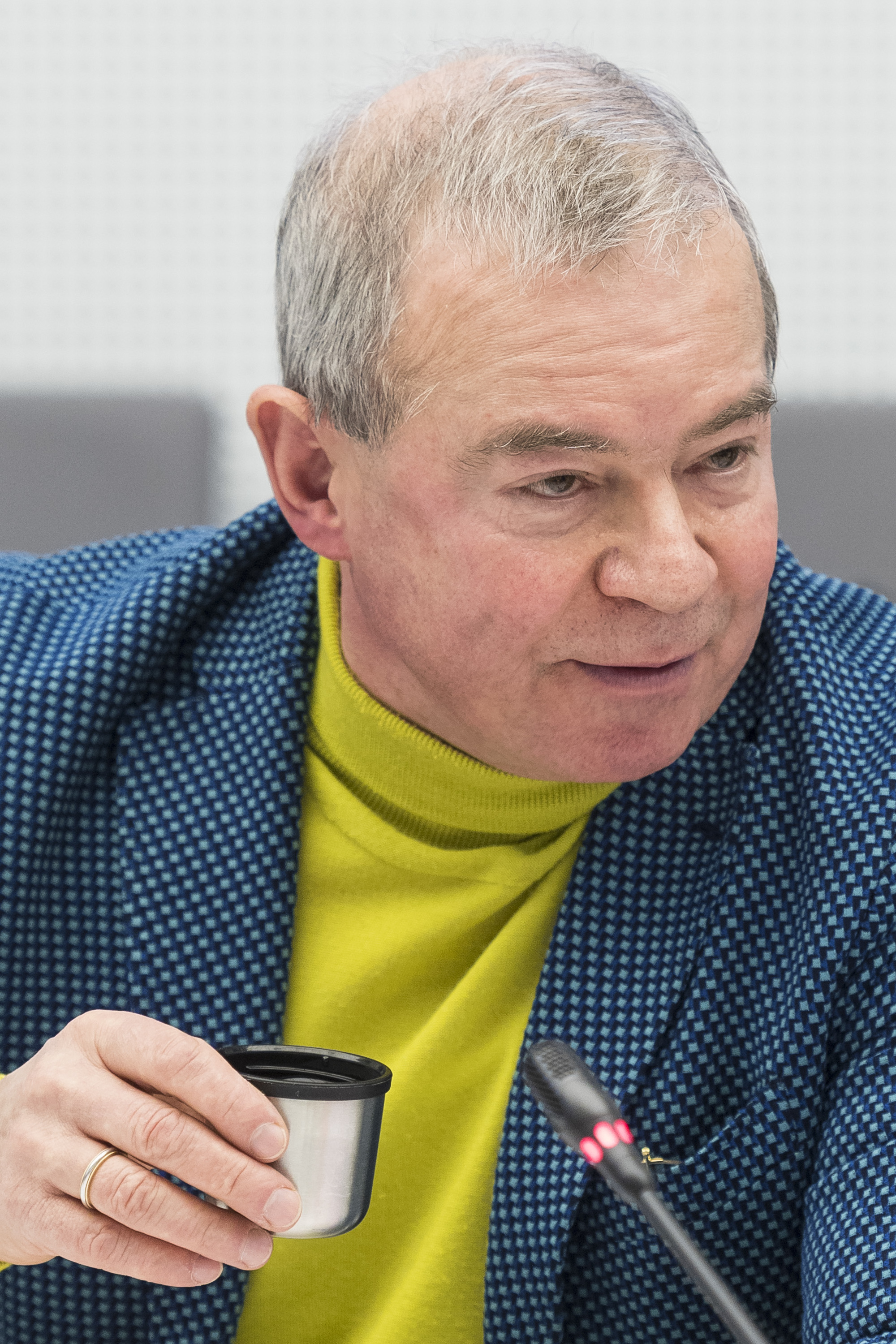
- Lembergs in 2017

Mayor of Ventspils
- In office 1988–2021
- Preceded by: Post established
- Succeeded by: Jānis Vītoliņš

Personal details
- Born: 26 September 1953 (age 73) Jēkabpils, Latvian Soviet Socialist Republic, USSR
- Party: Communist Party of the Soviet Union (1975–1990); For Latvia and Ventspils (since 1994)
- Spouse(s): Ināra Lemberga(1975–1990); Kristīne Lemberga (2015–)
- Children: Anrijs; Līga; Artūrs
- Education: University of Latvia
- Occupation: Politician
- Net worth: ▲US$270 million (2013)
- Website: www.aivarslembergs.lv

Aivars Lembergs (born 26 September 1953) is a Latvian politician, oligarch, and convicted money launderer who was the mayor of Ventspils from 1988 to 2021, a mandate from which he has been suspended since 2008. In February 2021, Lembergs was found guilty of charges relating to bribery and money-laundering. He received a sentence of five years in prison, confiscation of property, and a €20,000 fine.

He has been considered as one of the three most powerful oligarchs in Latvian history, alongside Andris Šķēle and Ainārs Šlesers.

== Early life and career ==
Lembergs was born in Jēkabpils, Latvia. He studied economics in Latvian State University (now known as the University of Latvia), graduating in 1977. He then worked in various positions in the Communist Party of Latvia, becoming the mayor of Ventspils in 1988. He continued as mayor after Latvia regained its independence (1988-1991) and for a further two decades up until 2021, being re-elected as mayor five times in total.

In 1994, Lembergs founded the regionalist For Latvia and Ventspils political party, of which Lembergs has been the chairman ever since. The For Latvia and Ventspils party has completely dominated the city politics of Ventspils ever since the party's foundation.

Before the 2006 parliamentary election, Lembergs' party entered into an alliance with the Union of Greens and Farmers, with the alliance naming Lembergs as its candidate for the Prime Minister of Latvia in future elections as well.

He remains its leading figure and chief financial supporter. He was one of the three "oligarchs" against which Zatlers' Reform Party pledged to act in 2011 if it achieved office.

== Criminal convictions ==
Since 2008 Lembergs has faced a long-running investigation for bribery, money laundering and abuse of office. He vehemently denies any wrongdoing.

On 22 February 2021, Lembergs was sentenced to 5-year imprisonment for massive graft, money laundering and abuse of office, along with a 20,000 euro fine, and confiscation of property worth tens of millions of euros. His son, Anrijs, received a sentence of two years. He was immediately arrested after that. Lembergs has compared his sentencing to the sentencing of Alexei Navalny.

Lembergs was released from Riga Central Prison after serving a year, on 25 February 2022, after posting a bail of €100,000 which was granted by the Riga Regional Court after a request from his lawyers. The conditions of the deal involve a ban on Lembergs serving as mayor of Ventspils in the future and attempts on appealing his original sentence. Despite the conviction and a split among the alliance, the Union of Greens and Farmers once again nominated him as their prime minister candidate in July 2022 before the 2022 parliamentary election (albeit without him running on the ballot).

== Controversies ==
Lembergs also featured in the 2016 Panama Papers offshore scandal. On 9 December 2019, the US government blocked his US assets under the Magnitsky Act.

On 10 December 2019, the US State Department declared him, and his wife and children, ineligible for entry into the US.

On 23 March 2020, Ventspils City Council deputy Ģirts Valdis Kristovskis turned to the State Police with a request to start a criminal process against Lembergs for his defamatory claims voiced against minority deputy and state official Kristovskis.
