= Awakening (political party) =

Latvian political party

Awakening for Latvia Atmoda Latvijai
- Leader: Andrejs Požarnovs; Mareks Raups
- Founded: 5 May 2014; 12 years ago (No sirds Latvijai); 5 February 2019; 7 years ago (Atmoda)
- Dissolved: 11 June 2024
- Preceded by: SKG Alliance (2019)
- Headquarters: Riga, Kr. Valdemāra iela 38, LV-1010
- Membership (2014): 1,000
- Ideology: Conservatism; Social conservatism Right-wing populism Euroscepticism
- Political position: Right-wing
- National affiliation: Atmoda
- European affiliation: European Christian Political Party
- Affiliate parties: Christian Democratic Union; Honor to Serve Our Latvia
- Colours: Red; Maroon
- Saeima: 0 / 100
- European Parliament: 0 / 8

Website
- nosirdslatvijai.lv

Awakening for Latvia (Latvian: Atmoda Latvijai) is a conservative political party in Latvia. It was founded as For Latvia from the Heart (Latvian: No sirds Latvijai) in May 2014 by former State Auditor Inguna Sudraba.

== History ==
The party was established on 5 May 2014 by Inguna Sudraba, a former State Auditor.

Although Sudraba had a clean image amongst the Latvian public, the 2014 election campaign saw her being filmed having lunch with an oligarch. In addition, she has refused to fully answer questions about the party's funding. The party campaigned on a general platform of fair wages and pensions, as well as increasing the accountability of government. In the parliamentary elections in October 2014 the party passed the electoral threshold, ensuring representation in the Saeima.

In January 2018, the party faction was removed from Saeima lists due to not having the minimal amount of MPs needed for a parliamentary group, following member Ringolds Balodis’ withdrawal from For Latvia from the Heart. Later, on March 13, the party joined the SKG Alliance.

In February 2019 the party renamed itself Awakening (Latvian: Atmoda), and in November of the same year it merged with Honor to Serve Our Latvia to form Awakening for Latvia. The new party is now the leader of the reformed SKG Alliance, now renamed Awakening, together with the Christian Democratic Union.

Sudraba left the board of the alliance (and, apparently, the party) in March 2020. She was replaced by former Baldone Municipality Chair Andrejs Požarnovs and Christian Democratic Union board chairman Mareks Raups.

The Awakening alliance has not participated in any elections since 2019.

== Election results ==
=== Saeima ===
Election	Leader	Votes	%	Seats	+/–	Status
2014	Inguna Sudraba	62,521	6.90 (#6)	7 / 100	New	Opposition
2018	Inguna Sudraba	7,114	0.85 (#11)	0 / 100	▼7	Extra-parliamentary

== Symbols and logos ==
For Latvia from the Heart logo
