= Second Kulbergs cabinet =

Government of Latvia since November 2026

- 44th Cabinet of Ministers of the Republic of Latvia

- Date formed: 17 November 2026

People and organisations
- Head of state: Edgars Rinkēvičs
- Head of government: Andris Kulbergs
- Total no. of members: 14
- Member party: United List; National Alliance
- Status in legislature: Majority (coalition)
- Opposition party: Latvia First; Sovereign Power / AJ; The Progressives; New Unity
- Opposition leader: Ainārs Šlesers; Julija Stepanenko; Andris Šuvajevs; Inese Lībiņa-Egnere

History
- Election: 2026 Latvian parliamentary election
- Legislature term: 15th Saeima
- Predecessor: First Kulbergs cabinet

The second Andris Kulbergs cabinet (Latvian: Kulberga 2. Ministru kabinets) is the 44th government of Latvia, sworn in on 17 November 2026 after Andris Kulbergs was again proposed as Prime Minister by President Edgars Rinkēvičs and elected by the Saeima, with 57 votes "for".

The government succeeded the First Kulbergs cabinet, following the 2026 Latvian parliamentary election, where Kulbergs' United List has won in a landslide. The cabinet is a majority coalition government between the United List and the National Alliance.

== Party breakdown ==
United List	7
Independent	4
National Alliance	3

== Composition ==
Nr.	Office	Image	Incumbent	Took office	Left office	Party
	Prime Minister of Latvia Prime Minister of Latvia		Andris Kulbergs	17 November 2026	Incumbent	United List
1.	Minister for Defence of Latvia Minister of Defence		Raivis Melnis	17 November 2026	Incumbent	Independent (nominated by United List)
2.	Minister of Foreign Affairs		Ģirts Jaunzems	17 November 2026	Incumbent	Independent (nominated by United List)
3.	Minister of Economics		Edgars Štelmahers	17 November 2026	Incumbent	United List
4.	Minister of Finance		Kārlis Purgailis	17 November 2026	Incumbent	Independent (nominated by United List)
5.	Minister of the Interior		Jānis Dombrava	17 November 2026	Incumbent	National Alliance
6.	Minister of Education and Science		Česlavs Batņa	17 November 2026	Incumbent	United List
7.	Minister of Culture		Nauris Puntulis	17 November 2026	Incumbent	National Alliance
8.	Minister of Welfare		Ilze Indriksone	17 November 2026	Incumbent	National Alliance
9.	Minister of Transport		Krišs Lipšāns	17 November 2026	Incumbent	United List
10.	Minister of Justice		Viesturs Vitovskis	17 November 2026	Incumbent	United List
11.	Minister of Health		Normunds Staņēvičs	17 November 2026	Incumbent	Independent (nominated by United List)
12.	Minister of Smart Administration and Regional Development		Edgars Tavars	17 November 2026	Incumbent	United List
13.	Minister of Agriculture		Edgars Putra	17 November 2026	Incumbent	United List
