= Siliņa cabinet =

Government of Latvia (2023–2026)

- 42nd Cabinet of Republic of Latvia

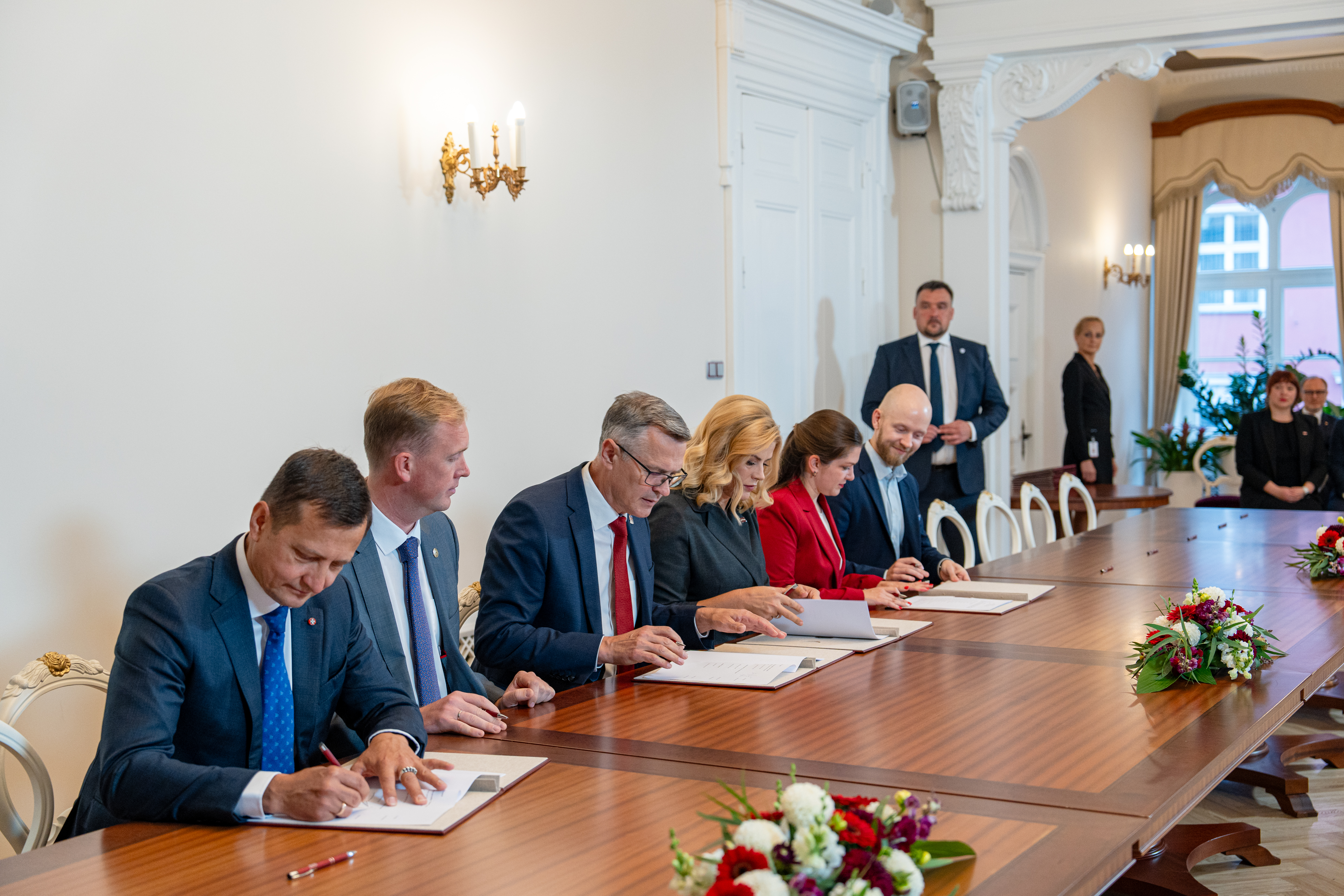
- Date formed: 15 September 2023
- Date dissolved: 28 May 2026

People and organisations
- Head of state: Edgars Rinkēvičs
- Head of government: Evika Siliņa
- Member party: New Unity; Union of Greens and Farmers (Note: GKR MP Oļegs Burovs confirmed that his party will cooperate with ZZS in current Saeima, and support the new coalition government which includes ZZS.); The Progressives (2023–2026)
- Status in legislature: Minority (coalition) (2023–2026); Caretaker government (2026)
- Opposition party: United List; National Alliance; For Stability! Latvia First
- Opposition leader: Edgars Tavars; Raivis Dzintars; Vilis Sruoģis; Maija Armaņeva

History
- Election: 2022 Latvian parliamentary election
- Legislature term: 14th Saeima
- Predecessor: Second Kariņš cabinet
- Successor: Kulbergs cabinet

The Evika Siliņa cabinet (Latvian: Siliņas ministru kabinets) was the 42nd government of Latvia between 15 September 2023 and 28 May 2026, led by Evika Siliņa from New Unity as Prime Minister.

The government began as a coalition between New Unity, Union of Greens and Farmers, and The Progressives.

After the explosion on 7 May in Rēzekne caused by Ukrainian strayed drones targeting Russia, losing public trust at defense, Andris Sprūds from the Progressive Party resigned on 11 May. Losing the ruling majority, Siliņa stepped down after the Progressive Party withdrew their support for her government.

== Party breakdown ==
New Unity	8
Union of Greens and Farmers	4

== Composition ==
Nr.	Office	Image	Incumbent	Party	In Office
	Prime Minister of Latvia Prime Minister of Latvia		Evika Siliņa	New Unity	15 September 2023 – 28 May 2026
1.	Minister for Defence of Latvia Minister for Defence		Andris Sprūds	The Progressives	15 September 2023 – 11 May 2026
2.	Minister for Foreign Affairs		Krišjānis Kariņš	New Unity	15 September 2023 – 10 April 2024
2.	Minister for Foreign Affairs		Baiba Braže	New Unity	19 April 2024 – 28 May 2026
3.	Minister for Economics		Viktors Valainis	Union of Greens and Farmers	15 September 2023 – 28 May 2026
4.	Minister for Finance		Arvils Ašeradens	New Unity	15 September 2023 – 28 May 2026
5.	Minister for the Interior		Rihards Kozlovskis	New Unity	15 September 2023 – 28 May 2026
6.	Minister for Education and Science		Anda Čakša	New Unity	15 September 2023 – 26 February 2025
6.	Minister for Education and Science		Dace Melbārde	New Unity	6 March 2025 – 28 May 2026
7.	Minister for Climate and Energy		Kaspars Melnis	Union of Greens and Farmers	15 September 2023 – 28 May 2026
8.	Minister for Culture		Agnese Logina	The Progressives	15 September 2023 – 17 June 2024
8.	Minister for Culture		Agnese Lāce	The Progressives	20 June 2024 – 28 May 2026
9.	Minister for Welfare		Uldis Augulis	Union of Greens and Farmers	15 September 2023 – 26 February 2025
9.	Minister for Welfare		Reinis Uzulnieks	Union of Greens and Farmers	6 March 2025 – 28 May 2026
10.	Minister for Transport		Kaspars Briškens	The Progressives	15 September 2023 – 26 February 2025
10.	Minister for Transport		Atis Švinka	The Progressives	6 March 2025 – 28 May 2026
11.	Minister for Justice		Inese Lībiņa-Egnere	New Unity	15 September 2023 – 28 May 2026
12.	Minister for Health		Hosams Abu Meri	New Unity	15 September 2023 – 28 May 2026
13.	Minister of Smart Administration and Regional Development		Inga Bērziņa	New Unity	15 September 2023 – 15 June 2025
13.	Minister of Smart Administration and Regional Development		Raimonds Čudars	New Unity	19 June 2025 – 28 May 2026
14.	Minister for Agriculture		Armands Krauze	Union of Greens and Farmers	15 September 2023 – 14 May 2026 (Note: Suspended due to criminal proceedings.)
