= 2014 European Parliament election in Latvia =

- 24 May 2014

All 8 Latvian seats to the European Parliament
- Turnout: 30.14%
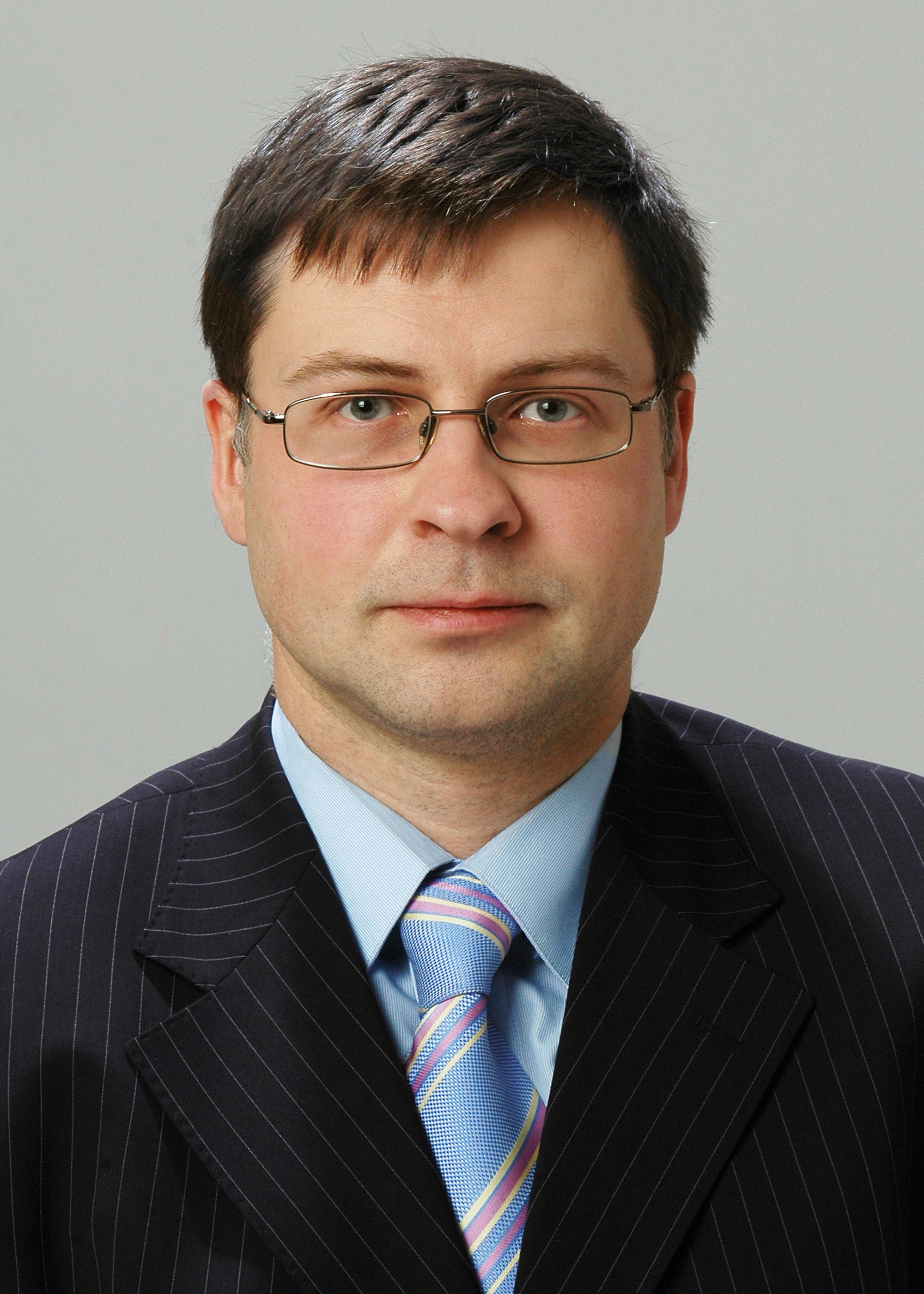

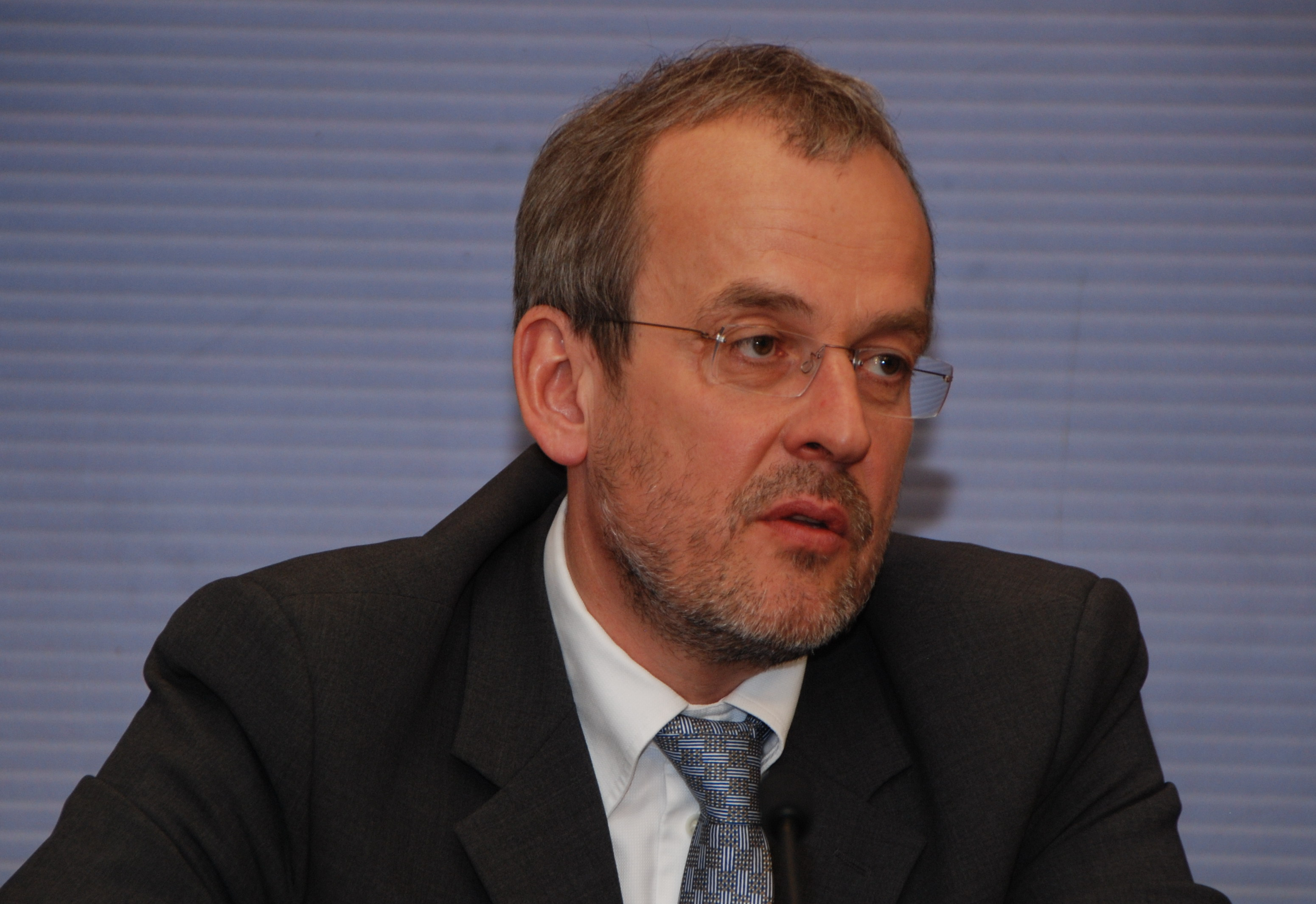

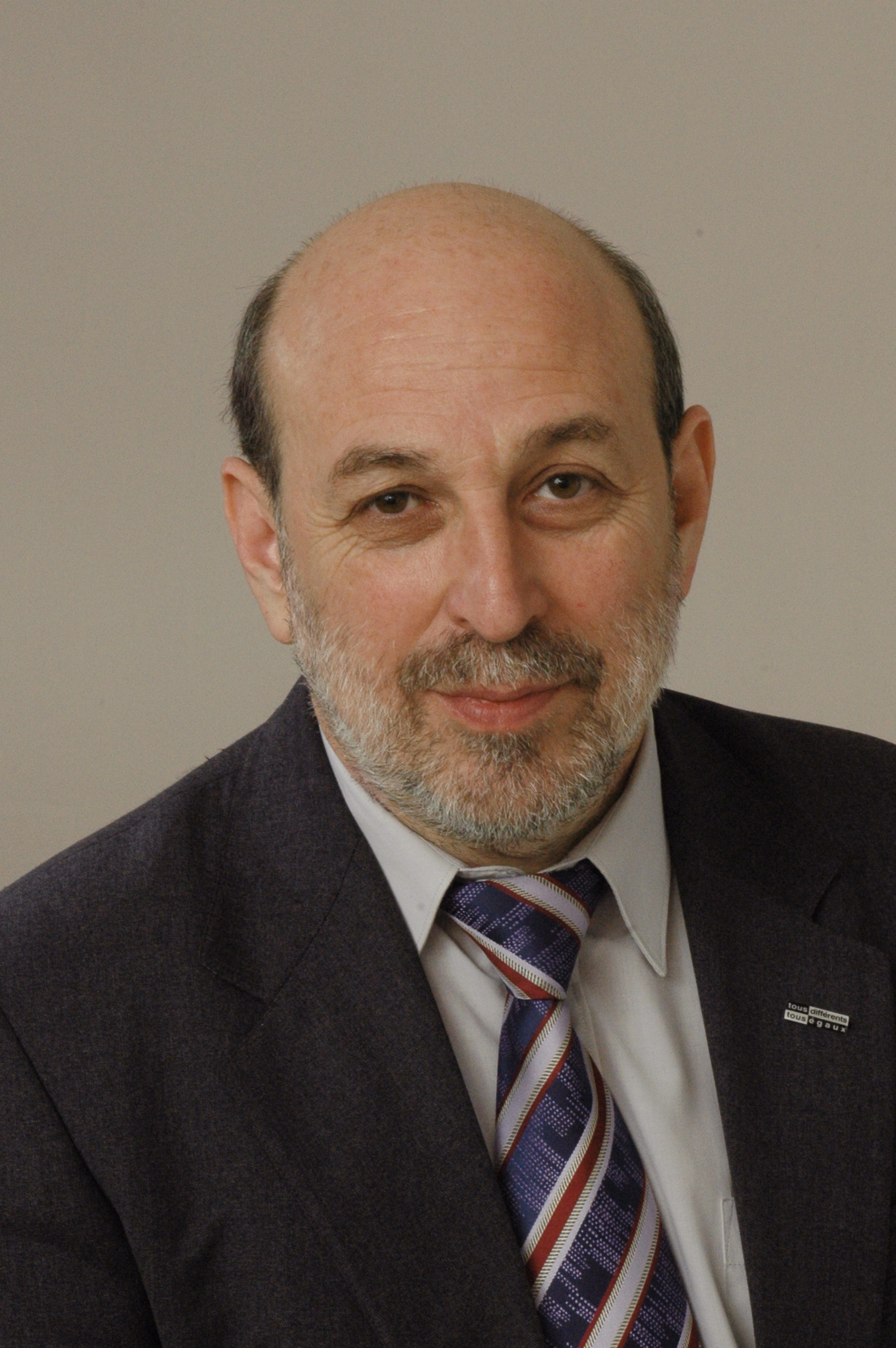

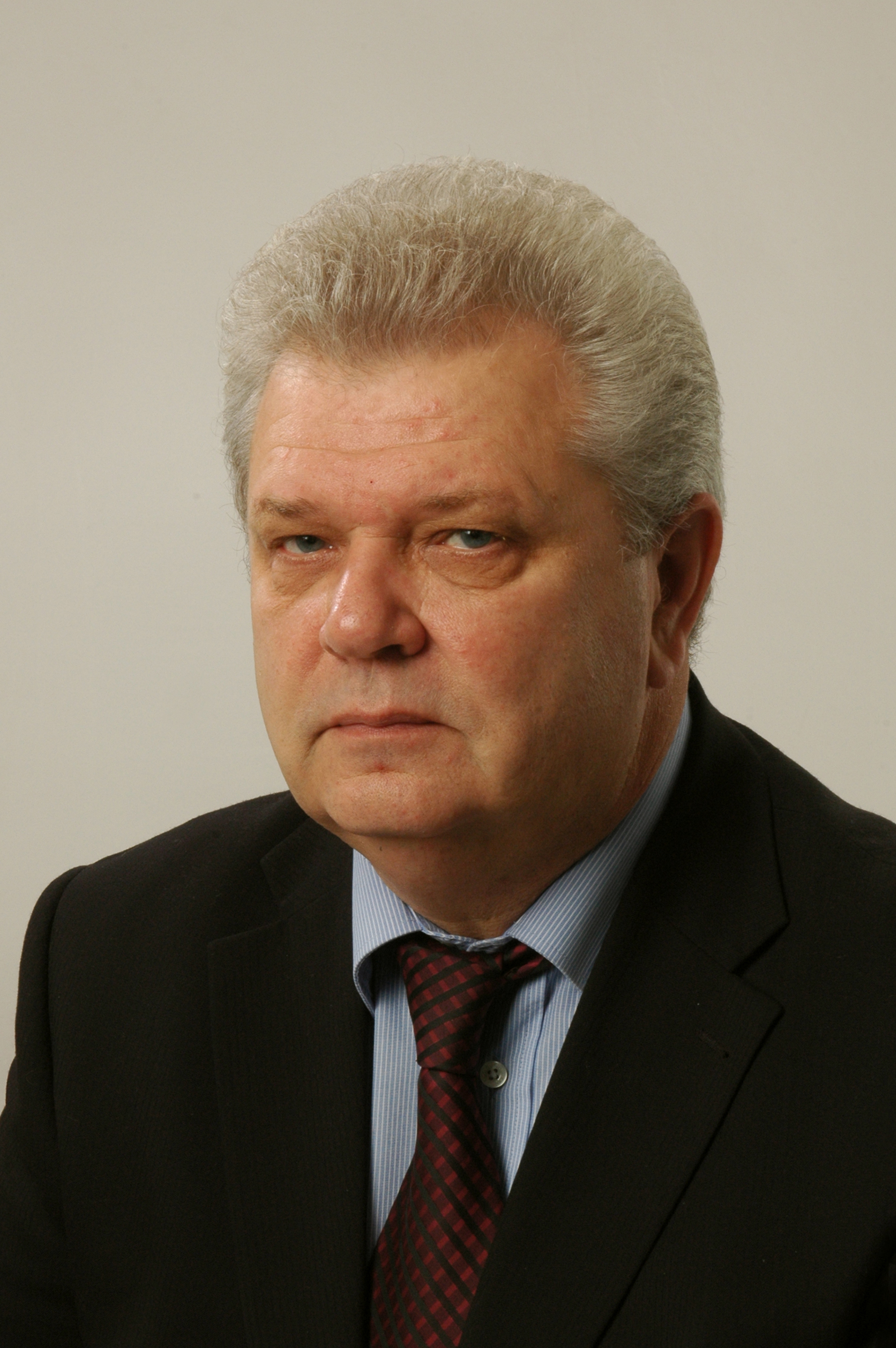

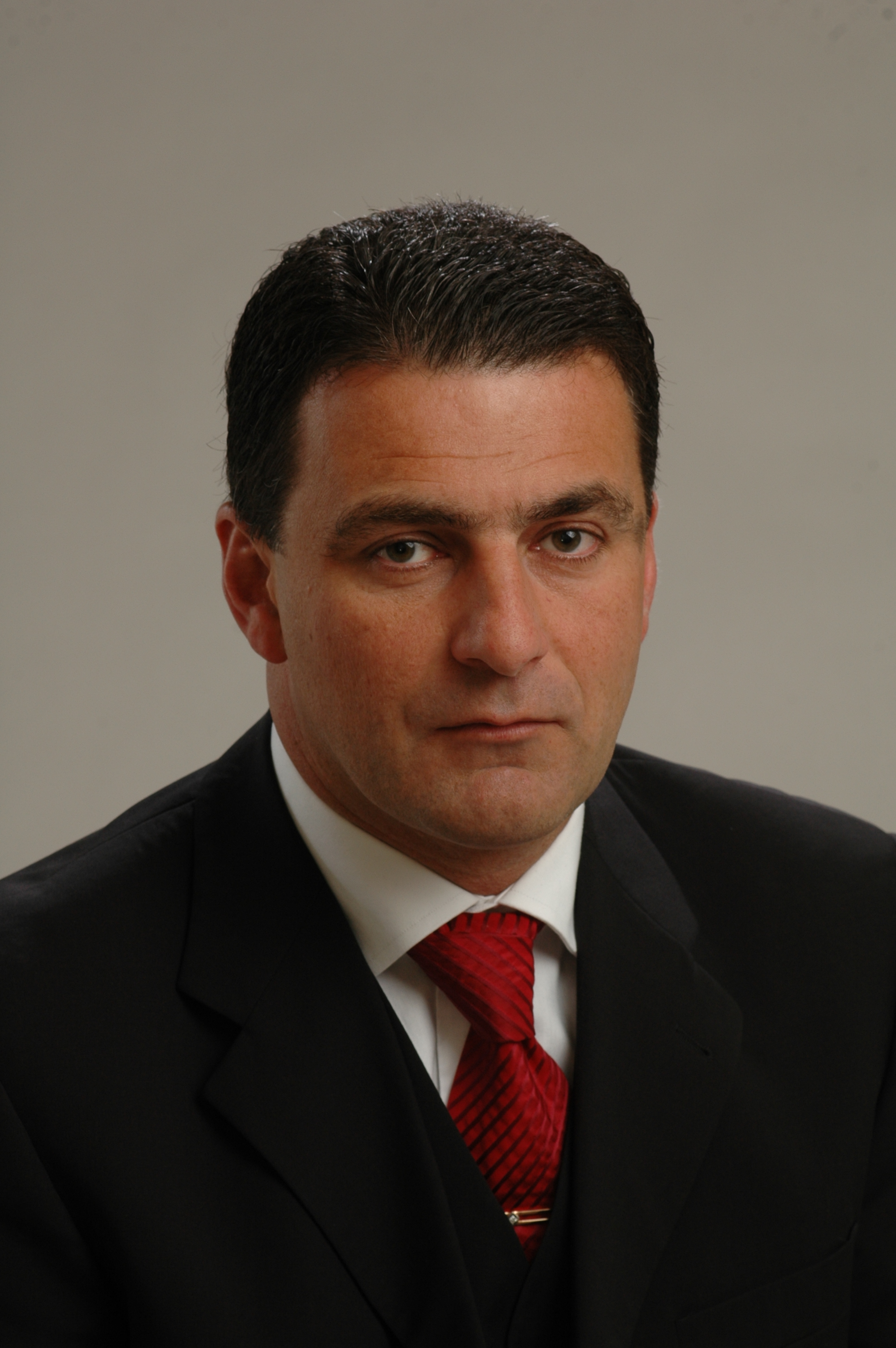
	First party	Second party	Third party
Leader	Valdis Dombrovskis	Roberts Zīle	Boris Tsilevitch
Party	Unity	National Alliance	Harmony
Alliance	EPP	ECR	S&D
Last election	merger of Civic Union, New Era Party and Society for Political Change	merger of For Fatherland and Freedom/LNNK and All for Latvia!	part of Harmony Centre
Seats won	4	1	1
Seat change	Steady	Steady	1 ▲
Popular vote	204,979	63,229	57,863
Percentage	46.56%	14.36%	13.14%
	Fourth party	Fifth party	Sixth party
Leader	Andris Bērziņš	Tatjana Ždanoka	Alexander Mirsky
Party	Union of Greens and Farmers	Latvian Russian Union	Alternative
Alliance	EFDD	Greens/EFA	S&D
Last election	3.7% 0 seats	9.66% 1 seat	new
Seats won	1	1	no seats
Seat change	1 ▲	Steady	1 ▼
Popular vote	36,637	28,303	16,566
Percentage	8.32%	6.43%	3.76%

An election of the delegation from Latvia to the European Parliament was held on 24 May 2014.

Unity party won these elections, The party has won every European parliament election since, as of 2024.

== Background ==
At the previous European Parliament election in Latvia in 2009, the country elected 8 MEPs. Upon entry into force of the Lisbon Treaty Latvia was awarded 1 additional MEP, again bringing the total number of MEPs representing Latvia to 9. Calculated from the results of the 2009 election, this MEP came from the Civic Union. For this election however, the number of MEP's representing Latvia was again reduced to 8.

== Results ==
Party	Votes	%	Seats	+/–
Unity	204,979	46.56	4	0
National Alliance	63,229	14.36	1	0
Social Democratic Party "Harmony"	57,863	13.14	1	0
Union of Greens and Farmers	36,637	8.32	1	+1
Latvian Russian Union	28,303	6.43	1	0
Alternative	16,566	3.76	0	New
Latvian Association of Regions	11,035	2.51	0	New
For Latvia's Development	9,421	2.14	0	New
Socialist Party of Latvia	6,817	1.55	0	New
Latvian Social Democratic Workers' Party	1,462	0.33	0	0
Christian Democratic Union	1,453	0.33	0	0
Latvian Rebirth Party	1,252	0.28	0	0
For a Presidential Republic	672	0.15	0	New
Sovereignty	599	0.14	0	New
Total	440,288	100.00	8	0
Valid votes	440,288	99.21		
Invalid/blank votes	3,514	0.79		
Total votes	443,802	100.00		
Registered voters/turnout	1,472,478	30.14		
Source: CVK

=== Elected MEPs ===
Name	National party	EP Group	Points (Note: Points are calculated from votes cast for a candidate's list minus 'crossings-out' and adding 'pluses' for individual candidates)
Valdis Dombrovskis	Unity	EPP	346 821
Sandra Kalniete	Unity	EPP	277 124
Artis Pabriks	Unity	EPP	261 163
Krišjānis Kariņš	Unity	EPP	228 998
Roberts Zīle	National Alliance	ECR	99 937
Andrejs Mamikins	Harmony	S&D	84 953
Iveta Grigule	Greens & Farmers	EFDD (Note: Iveta Grigule withdrew from the EFDD group on 16 October 2014 to become a Non-Attached Member. On 27 April 2015 she joined the Alliance of Liberals and Democrats for Europe Group.)	46 939
Tatjana Ždanoka	Russian Union	G-EFA	51 742

Elected MEPs
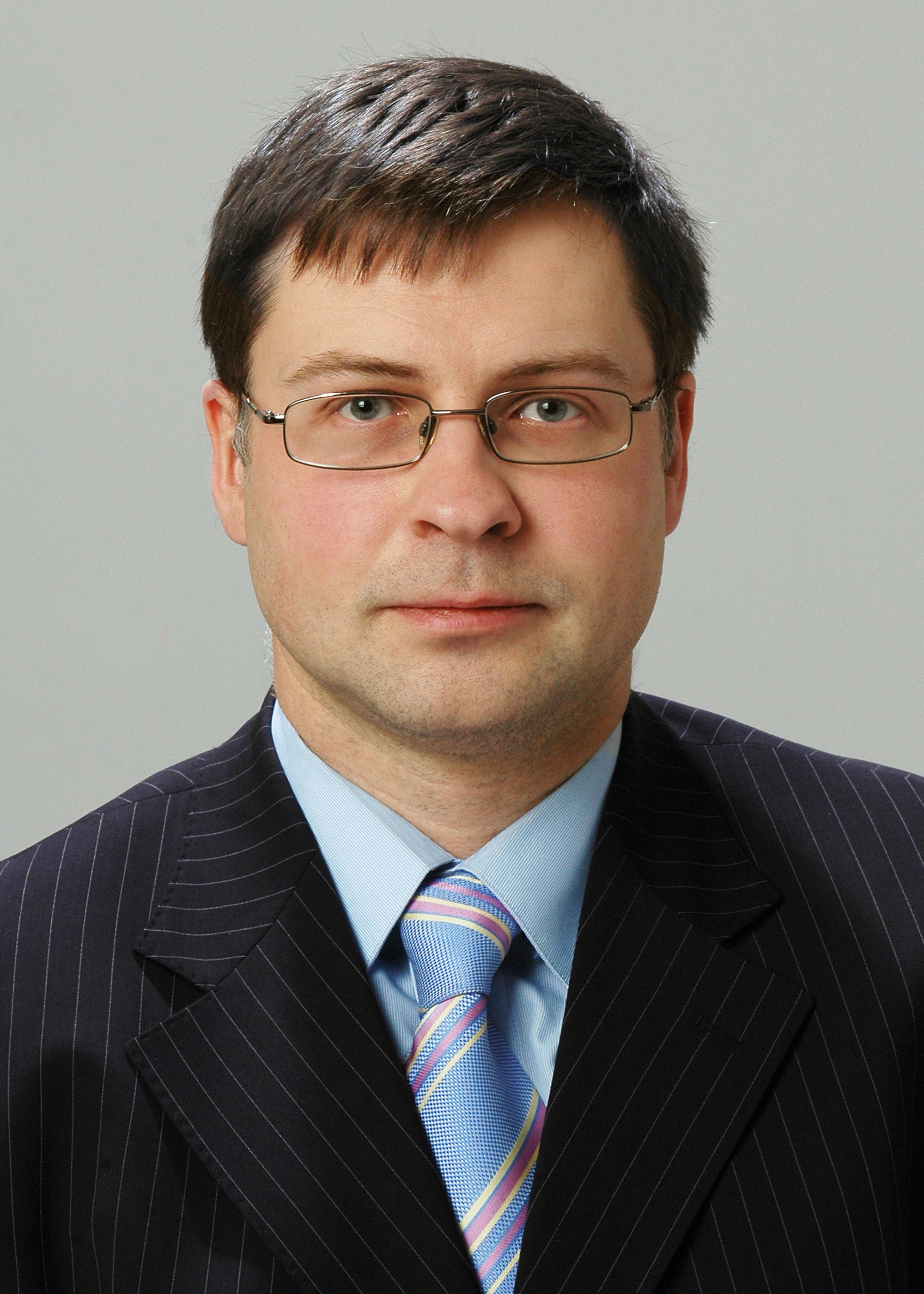
Valdis Dombrovskis (V)

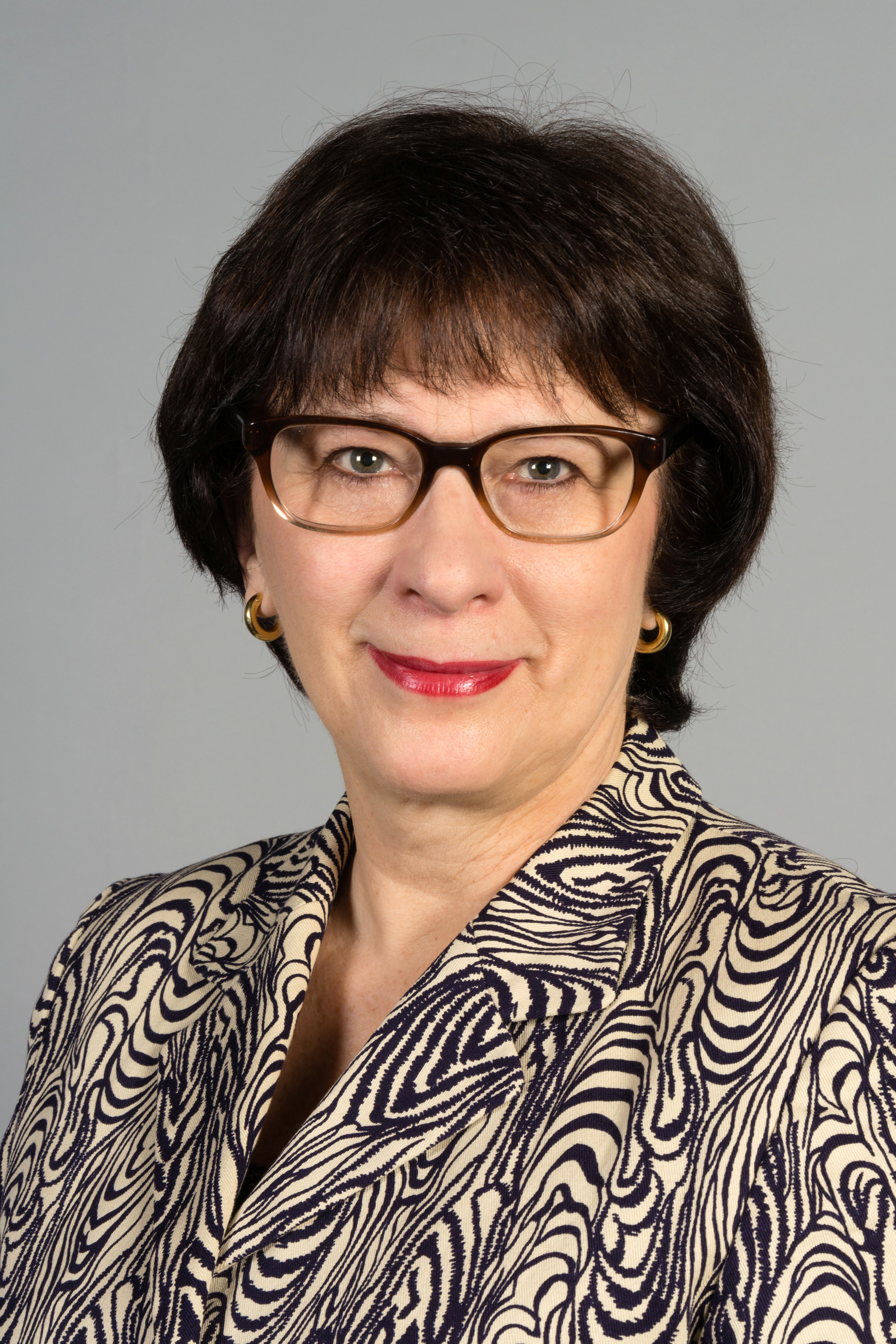
Sandra Kalniete (V)

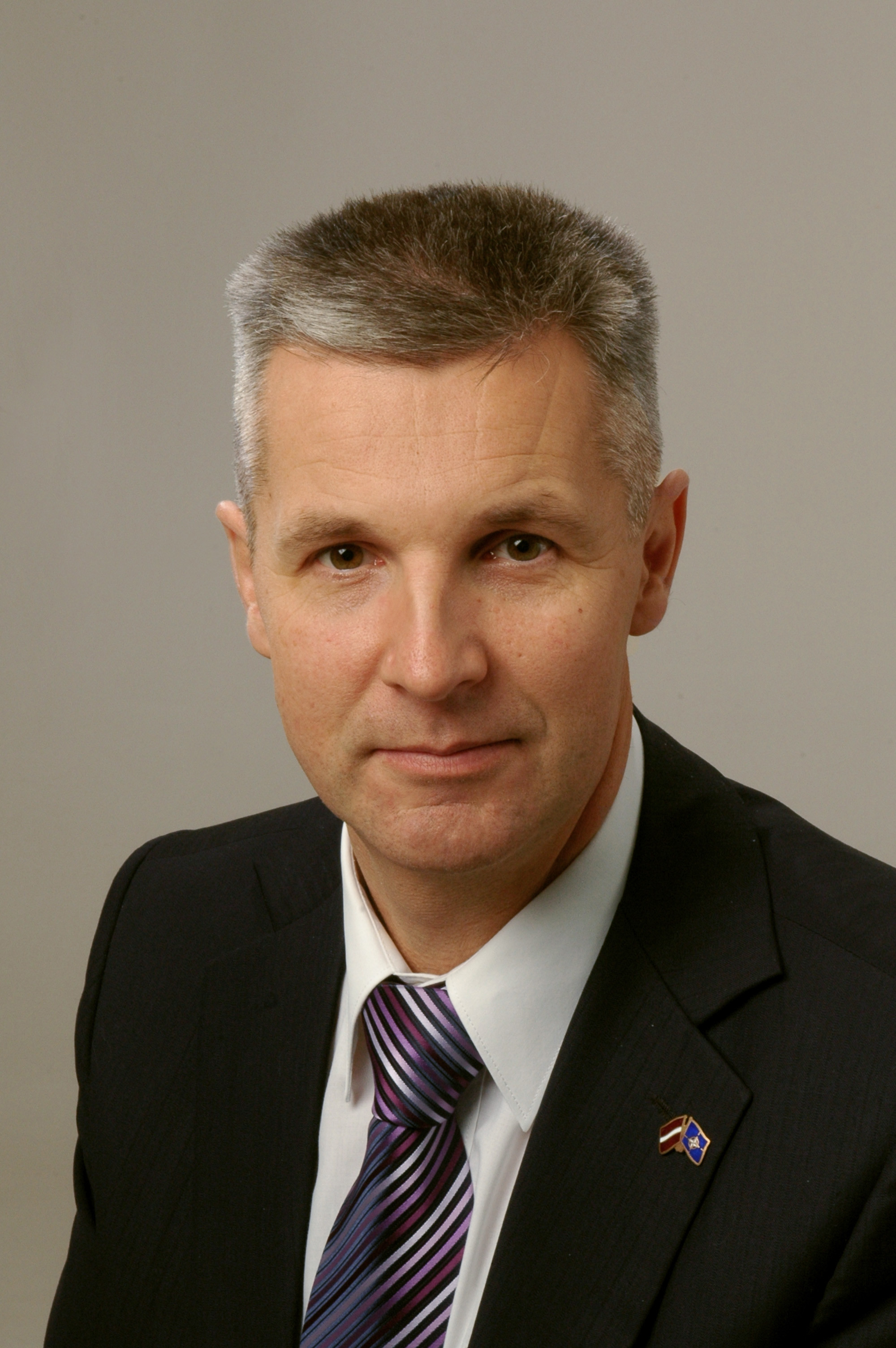
Artis Pabriks (V)

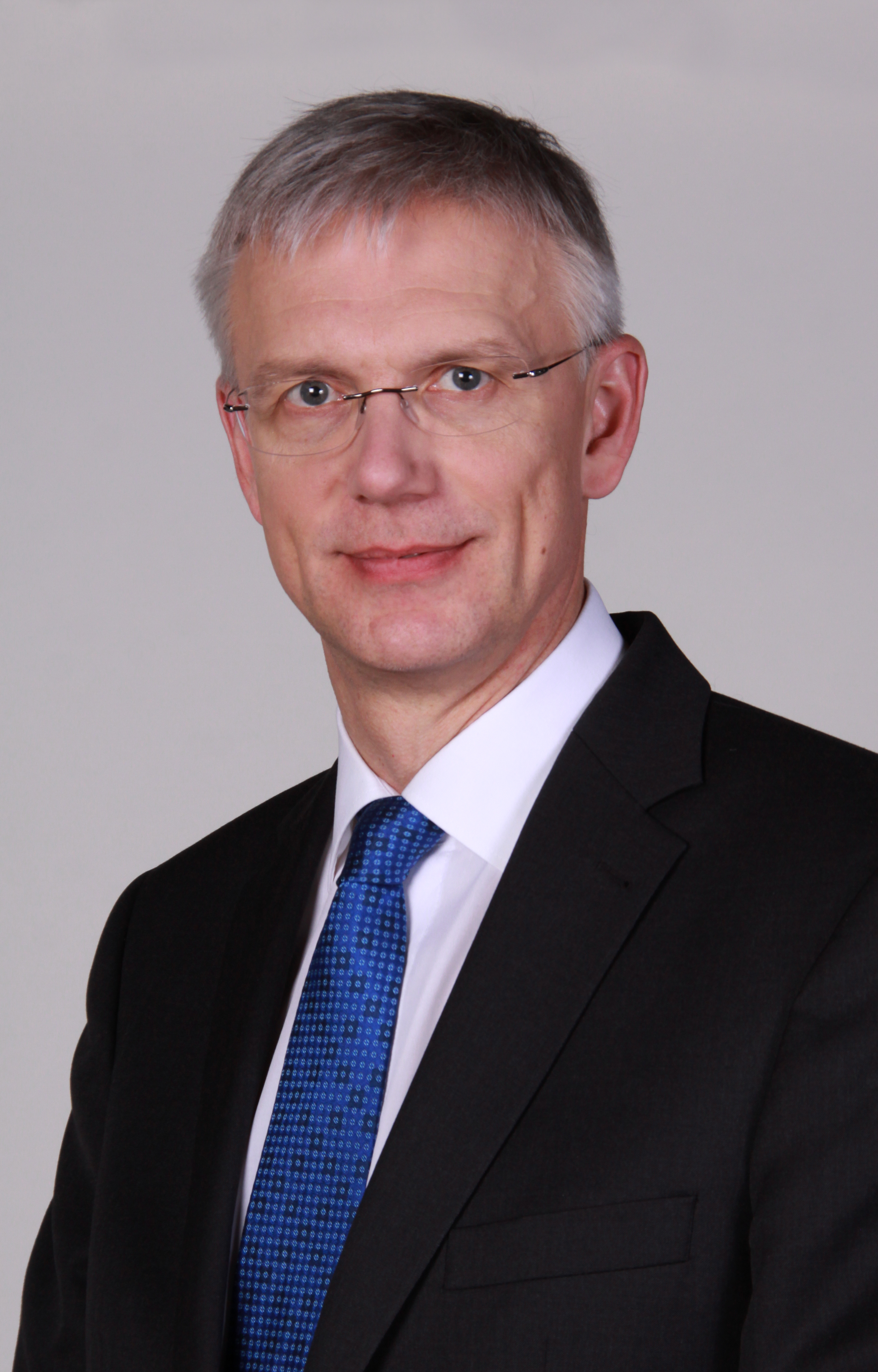
Arturs Krišjānis Kariņš (V)

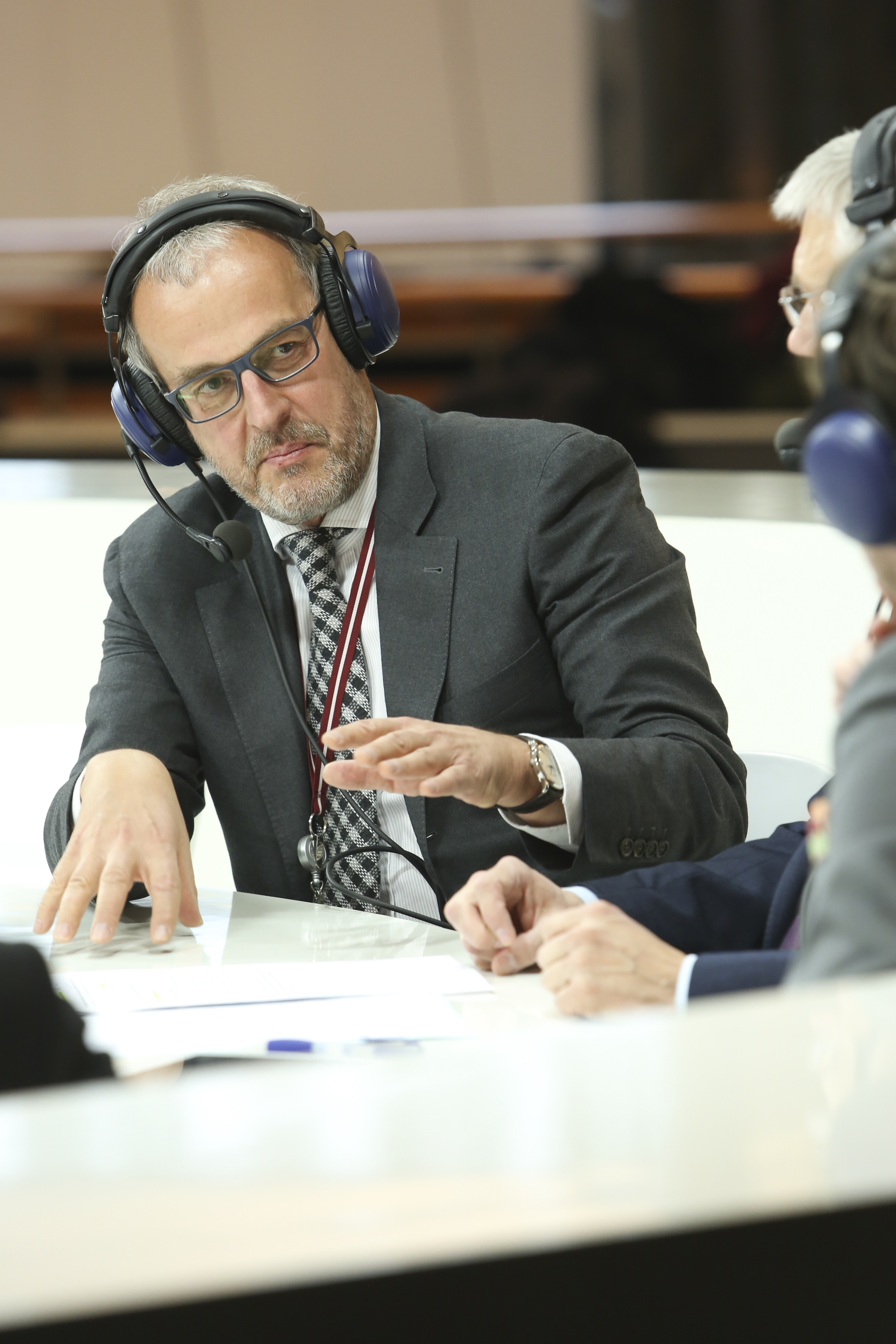
Roberts Zīle (NA)

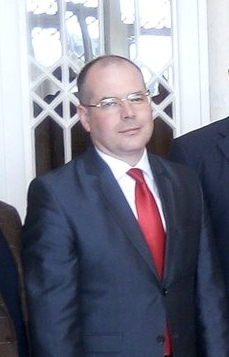
Andrejs Mamikins (S)

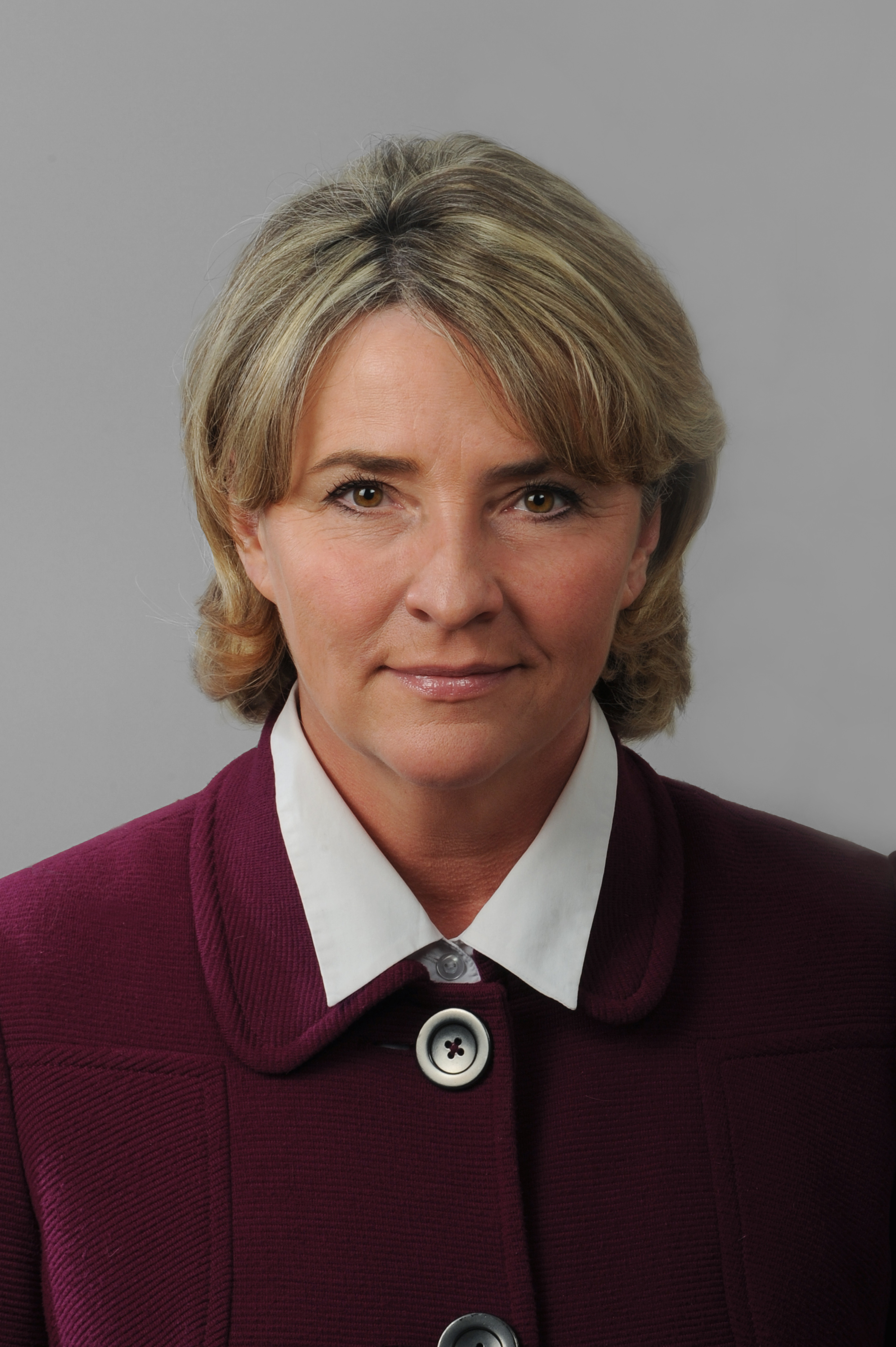
Iveta Grigule (ZZS)

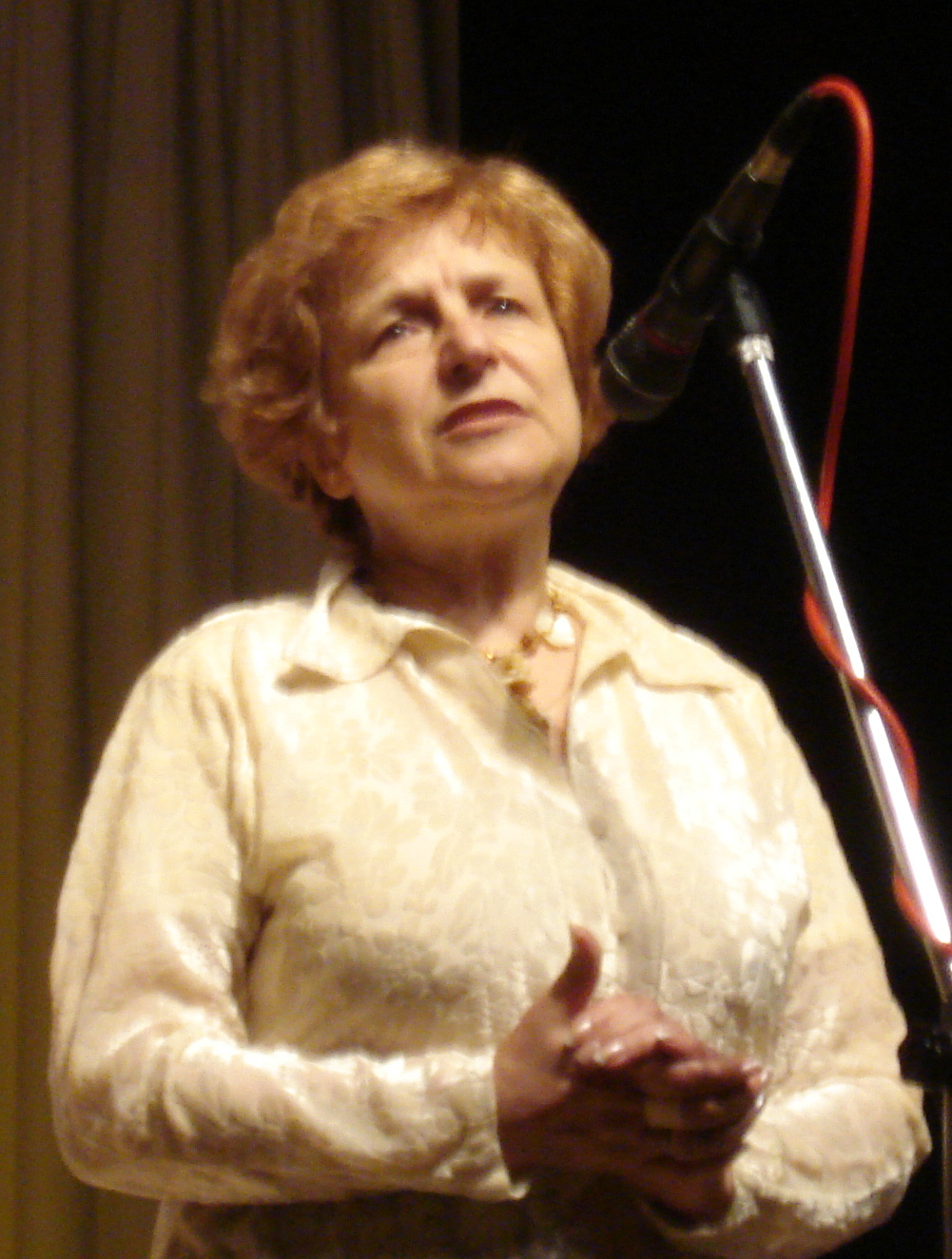
Tatjana Ždanoka (LKS)

== See also ==
- 2014 European Parliament election
- Politics of Latvia
- List of political parties in Latvia
