= Edgars Tavars =

Latvian politician (born 1982)

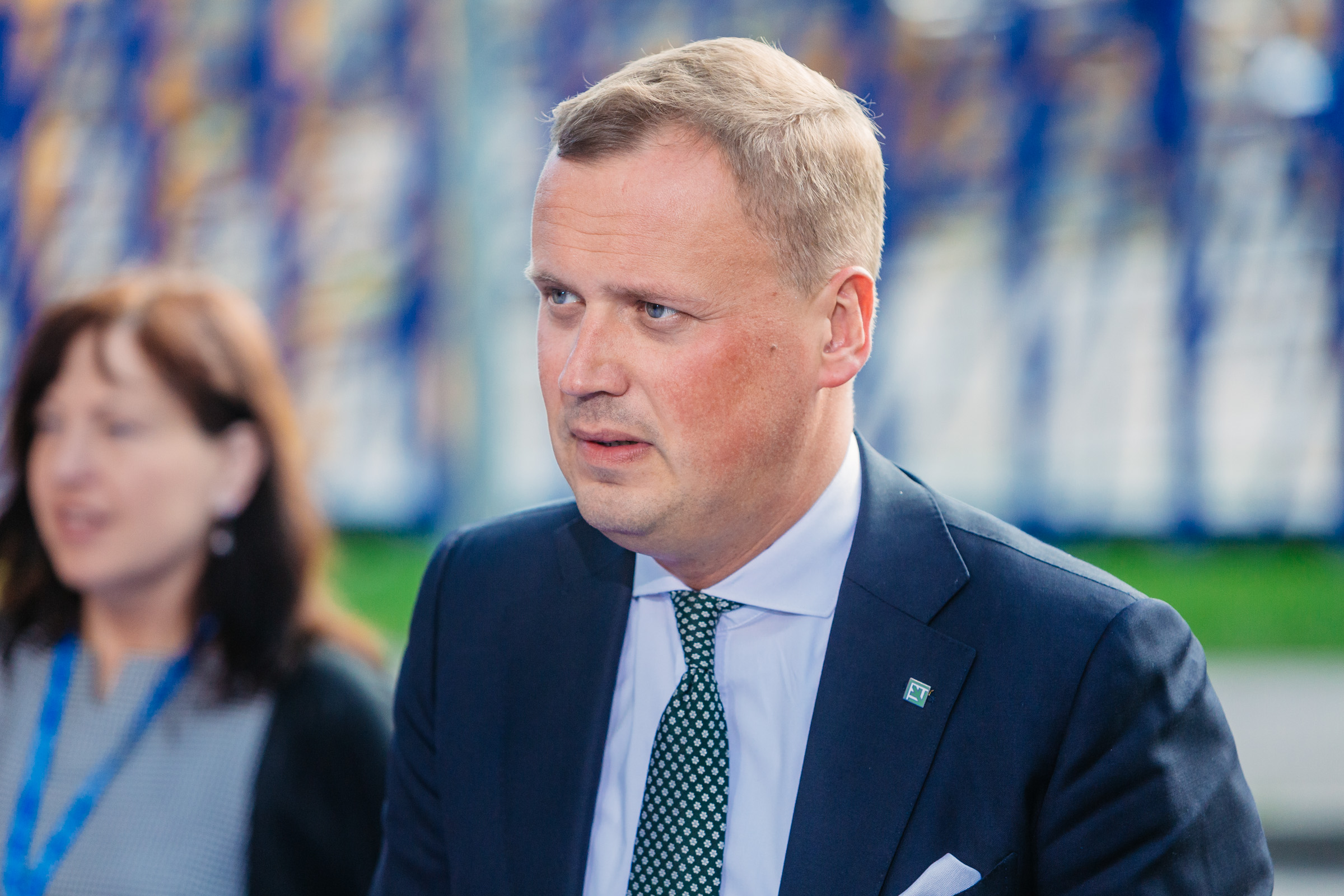
- Tavars in 2017

Member of the Saeima
- Incumbent
- Assumed office 7 January 2021
- Preceded by: Dana Reizniece-Ozola
- Constituency: Semigallia

Personal details
- Born: 12 August 1982 (age 44)
- Party: Latvian Green Party
- Other political affiliations: United List

Edgars Tavars (born 12 August 1982) is a Latvian politician serving as leader of the Green Party since 2011. He has been a member of the Saeima since 2021.
