= Christian Democratic Union (Latvia) =

Latvian political party

Christian Democratic Union Kristīgi demokrātiskā savienība
- Leader: Māra Viktorija Zilgalve Secretary General Armands Agrums
- Founded: 9 March 1991
- Headquarters: Skolas ielā 21, Rīga, LV-1010
- Ideology: Christian democracy
- Political position: Centre-right
- National affiliation: Awakening
- European affiliation: European Christian Political Party
- Colours: Orange, Red
- Saeima: 0 / 100
- European Parliament: 0 / 9

Website
- kds.lv

The Christian Democratic Union (Latvian: Kristīgi demokrātiskā savienība, KDS) is a minor Christian-democratic political party in Latvia. It is a member of the Awakening alliance and is currently led by Māra Viktorija Zilgalve and Secretary General Armands Agrums.

== History ==
The KDS was founded in 1991. The party participated in the 1993 Saeima election and obtained 5.0% of the vote and six seats. In the next parliamentary election in 1995 the party contested in alliance with the Latvian Farmers' Union and won 6.3% of the vote and eight seats. In 1998 it joined forces with the Workers' Party and the Latvian Green Party, in 2002 with Latvia's First Party and in 2006 with the Latvian Social Democratic Workers' Party.

In the 2010 legislative election it got just 0.36% of the votes and thus failed to overcome the 5% threshold.

The two European elections in 2004 and 2009 were unsuccessful (0.4% and 0.3% of the vote respectively).

The party formed the SKG Alliance with two other parties, the Latvian Social Democratic Workers' Party and Honor to Serve Our Latvia, to run together in the 2018 Saeima election. After the Social Democrats later left, the alliance was renamed to Awakening.

Since 2019, the Awakening alliance has not participated in any elections.

== Program ==
The party's platform is based on Christian values. Economically the Christian Democratic Union advocates the elimination of corruption, lower taxes, free enterprise, the strengthening of agriculture and the improvement of infrastructure. The party favours the model of a social market economy in the tradition of Ludwig Erhard.
