= 2026 Latvian parliamentary election =

- 3 October 2026
- All 100 seats in the Saeima; 51 seats needed for a majority
- Turnout: 51.79% (▼7.62pp)
Party	Leader	Vote %	Seats	+/–
AS	Andris Kulbergs	35.76	41	+26
LPV	Ainārs Šlesers	13.25	17	+8
SV–AJ	Jūlija Stepaņenko	11.87	15	+15
NA	Ilze Indriksone	9.02	10	−3
PRO	Andris Šuvajevs	7.98	10	0
JV	Arvils Ašeradens	6.45	7	−19
This lists parties that won seats. See the complete results below.

Results by region
Prime Minister before	Prime Minister after
Andris Kulbergs; AS	Andris Kulbergs; AS

Parliamentary elections were held in Latvia on 3 October 2026, following the end of the term of the fourteenth Saeima elected in 2022.

The elections saw the lowest voter turnout in Latvian history.

== Electoral system ==
The 100 members of the Saeima are elected by open list proportional representation from five multi-member constituencies ranging in size from 11 to 38 seats and based on the regions of Latvia, with overseas votes included in the Rīga constituency. Seats are allocated using the Sainte-Laguë method, with a national electoral threshold of 5%.

Voters may cast "specific votes" for candidates on the list for which they have voted. This involves marking a green-colored "FOR" box opposite the candidate's name to indicate preference (positive votes), or marking a red-colored "AGAINST" box opposite the candidate's name to indicate disapproval (negative votes). The mark may be a cross, tick, shading, or similar indication. An unaltered ballot paper may also be placed in the envelope. The number of votes for each candidate is calculated as the number of votes cast for the list, plus the number of positive votes they receive, minus the number of negative votes they receive. The candidates with the highest vote totals fill their party's seats.

=== Seat redistribution ===
The Central Electoral Commission is required to determine the number of Members of Parliament (MPs) to be elected in each constituency based on the number of eligible voters five months before the election. On 7 May 2026, the Central Electoral Commission announced the new distribution of seats among the constituencies. The Rīga constituency gained two seats compared to the 2022 election, while the Kurzeme and Latgale constituencies each lost one seat.

May 2026 redistribution
Constituency	Seats	Change
Rīga	38	▲2
Vidzeme	26	Steady
Zemgale	13	Steady
Latgale	12	▼1
Kurzeme	11	▼1
Total	100	Steady

== Parties ==
=== Overview ===
The table below presents parties and party alliances participating in the 2026 election.

Name		Ideology	PM candidate	Leader(s)	2022 result		Seats at dissolution
Name		Ideology	PM candidate	Leader(s)	Votes (%)	Seats	Seats at dissolution
JV	New Unity; Jaunā Vienotība	Liberalism; Liberal conservatism Civic nationalism	Arvils Ašeradens	Evika Siliņa	19.2%	26 / 100	25 / 100
ZZS	Union of Greens and Farmers; Zaļo un zemnieku savienība	Agrarianism; Conservatism	Viktors Valainis	Armands Krauze	12.6%	16 / 100	16 / 100
AS	United List (Note: includes Izaugsme candidates); Apvienotais saraksts	Regionalism; Green conservatism	Andris Kulbergs	Edvards Smiltēns; Edgars Tavars	11.1%	15 / 100	12 / 100
NA	National Alliance; Nacionālā apvienība	National conservatism Economic liberalism	Ilze Indriksone		9.4%	13 / 100	12 / 100
PRO	The Progressives (Note: includes Movement For!, We – For Talsi and the Municipality and Platform Kopā Liepājai candidates); Progresīvie	Social democracy Green politics	Andris Šuvajevs	Agnese Lāce; Andris Šuvajevs	6.2%	10 / 100	9 / 100
LPV	Latvia First (Note: includes Together for Latvia, Let's Go, Latgale! and Daugavpils — mana pils candidates); Latvija pirmajā vietā	National conservatism Right-wing populism Christian nationalism	Ainārs Šlesers		6.3%	9 / 100	8 / 100
ST!	For Stability! Stabilitātei!	Populism; Russian minority politics	Svetlana Čulkova		6.9%	11 / 100	4 / 100
LA	For Latvia's Development; Latvijas attīstībai	Classical Liberalism	Ivars Ijabs	Juris Pūce	5% (Note: as Development/For!)	0 / 100	0 / 100
SC	Harmony Centre; Saskaņas Centrs	Social democracy Russian minority politics		Jānis Urbanovičs	4.9% (Note: as Harmony)	0 / 100	0 / 100
GS	Gobzems' List; Gobzema saraksts	Populism	Aldis Gobzems		3.7% (Note: as For Each and Every One)	0 / 100	0 / 100
SV–AJ	Sovereign Power–Alliance of Young Latvians (Note: includes Sovereign Power, Alliance of Young Latvians and Latvian Russian Union candidates); Suverēnā vara/Apvienība Jaunlatvieši	Christian right Russian minority politics	Jūlija Stepaņenko		3.3% (Note: as Sovereign Power)	0 / 100	0 / 100
JKP	New Conservative Party; Jaunā konservatīvā partija	Liberal conservatism	Jānis Citskovskis	Sigords Stradiņš	3.1%	0 / 100	0 / 100
MMN	We Change the Rules; Mēs mainām noteikumus	Electoral reform Anti-immigration	Alvis Hermanis		1.8% (Note: as Republic)	0 / 100	0 / 100
ASL	Rising Sun for Latvia; Austošā Saule Latvijai	Ethnic nationalism National conservatism Antiglobalism	Raivis Zeltīts		did not exist		0 / 100

=== Party candidates ===
№	Lists	Leading candidates					Number of candidates					
№	Lists	Rīga	Vidzeme	Latgale	Kurzeme	Zemgale	Rīga	Vidzeme	Latgale	Kurzeme	Zemgale	Total
1	Sovereign Power/Alliance of Young Latvians: Latvian Russian Union	Jūlija Stepaņenko	Karina Sprūde	Vjačeslavs Stepaņenko	Edgars Dārznieks	Andrejs Pagors	43	31	17	16	18	125
2	We Change the Rules	Jāzeps Baško	Alvis Hermanis	Ainars Mielavs	Ēriks Pucens	Edvarts Krusts	27	20	11	9	10	77
3	Harmony Centre	Jānis Urbanovičs	Kārlis Krēsliņš	Aivars Smans	Valērijs Agešins	Irina Dolgova	39	24	16	8	18	105
4	Union of Greens and Farmers	Viktors Valainis	Daiga Mieriņa	Kaspars Melnis	Uldis Augulis	Reinis Uzulnieks	43	31	17	16	18	125
5	National Alliance	Ilze Indriksone	Jānis Dombrava	Edmunds Teirumnieks	Artūrs Butāns	Jānis Vitenbergs	43	31	17	16	18	125
6	Gobzems' List	Arigo Toro	Agris Freifalts	Raimonds Nipers	Daniels Balika	Ilze Kalniņa	35	16	4	7	11	73
7	United List: Izaugsme	Andris Kulbergs	Edvards Smiltēns	Juris Viļums	Māris Kučinskis	Edgars Tavars	43	31	17	16	18	125
8	Latvia First: Together for Latvia; Let's Go, Latgale!; Daugavpils — mana pils	Ainārs Šlesers	Linda Liepiņa	Aleksandrs Bartaševičs	Ramona Petraviča	Edmunds Zivtiņš	43	31	17	16	18	125
9	New Unity	Baiba Braže	Evika Siliņa	Rihards Kozlovskis	Inga Bērziņa	Edmunds Jurēvics	43	31	17	16	18	125
10	New Conservative Party	Jānis Citskovskis	Guntis Bībers	Pēteris Aglonietis	Daiga Pirogova	Mārtiņš Štāls	29	19	10	11	16	85
11	For Latvia's Development	Iveta Ratinīka	Juris Pūce	Andris Vaivods	Edgars Jaunups	Leons Līdums	33	23	6	11	11	84
12	Rising Sun for Latvia	Raivis Zeltīts	Dace Lindberga	Aiva Zālīte	Jānis Zalāns	Gatis Ilgža	25	24	7	10	9	75
13	For Stability!	Svetlana Čulkova	Pāvels Kuzmins	Nataļja Marčenko-Jodko	Ludmila Rjazanova	Igors Orlovs	38	4	7	5	6	60
14	The Progressives: Movement For!; We – For Talsi and the Municipality	Andris Šuvajevs	Andris Sprūds	Leila Rasima	Agnese Lāce	Atis Švinka	43	31	17	16	18	125

== Opinion polls ==
Graphical summary.

=== 2026 ===
Polling firm	Fieldwork date	Sample size	JV	ZZS	AS	NA	ST!	LPV	PRO	KP (Note: Joint list with The Progressives since June 2026)	LA	SC	GS	LKS	SV	JKP	ASL	MMN	Others	Lead
Polling firm	Fieldwork date	Sample size	JV	ZZS	AS	NA	ST!	LPV	PRO	KP	LA	S	GS	LKS	SV	JKP	ASL	MMN	Others	Lead
SKDS/LTV/RSU (exit poll)	3 Oct 2026	~6,500	6.7	3.7	35.6	8.7	1.7	11.3	11.1		3.1	0.6	0.9	–	10.8	0.2	1.3	3	–	24.3
SKDS/LTV	4–16 Sep 2026	2,035	6.8	6.5	22.7	8.7	3.1	13.3	10.2		3.7	2.4	1.8	–	14.1	0.7	2	3.7	0.3	8.6
Latvijas Fakti	Sep 2026	1,018	6.2	10.6	23.8	8.9	3.2	12.9	12.4		3.3	2.6	1.5	–	8.7	0.9	1.5	3.2	0.3	10.9
Latvijas Fakti	21–31 Aug 2026	1,058	8.9	10.4	23.6	11	2.5	12.6	10.7		2.5	1.7	0.7	–	9.6	0.7	1.2	3.3	0.6	11
SKDS/LTV	13–19 Aug 2026	1,205	7.0	3.8	23.6	6.7	3.3	12.2	14.1		4.1	2.1	1.0	–	17.1	1.0	1.3	2.5	0.2	6.5
SKDS/LTV	10–15 Jul 2026	1,205	7.2	4.2	19.2	8.7	2.5	14.8	14.3		3	1.9	0.5	–	17.1	1.1	1.9	3.6	0.0	2.1
SKDS/LTV	6–16 Jun 2026	1,832	7.3	6.9	17.1	9.5	2.9	15	12.1	0.5	2	2.8	–	2.2	13.8	0.5	1.7	4.5	1.2	2.1
SKDS/LTV	24 Apr – 6 May 2026	1,126	11.3	8.7	11.5	8.2	3.6	14.9	14.9	0.6	2.7	2.2	–	1.6	10	1.2	2	5.2	1.4	Tie
Gemius	31 Mar – 7 Apr 2026	1,538	9.4	5.2	8.2	8.4	2.2	14.3	14.1	0.9	3.9	2.9	0.3	–	6.1	0.6	1.9	8.1	13.5	0.2
SKDS/LTV	Mar 2026	1,809	11	7.4	10.6	11.8	4.5	14.6	12.6	1.5	2	3.4	–	1.1	10.6	1.7	1.8	3.7	1.7	2.0
Gemius	24 Feb – 2 Mar 2026	1,168	15.1	4.1	6.9	8.9	2.8	8.4	13.2	0.4	2.2	4.2	0.4	–	5.3	2.0	3.4	7.3	15.4	1.9

=== 2025 ===
Polling firm	Fieldwork date	Sample size	JV	ZZS	AS	NA	ST!	LPV	PRO	KP	LA	S	P21	PLV	SV	JKP	ASL	Others	Lead
Polling firm	Fieldwork date	Sample size	JV	ZZS	AS	NA	ST!	LPV	PRO	KP	LA	S	P21	LKS	SV	JKP	ASL	Others	Lead
Gemius	16–26 Dec 2025	1,423	11.3	3.8	9.6	16.5	2.4	15.5	11.0	1.9	2.1	1.0	1.3	3.0	5.6	0.6	4.2	10.1	1.0
SKDS/LTV	21 Nov – 4 December 2025	1,819	16.0	9.2	9.9	10.3	5.4	13.9	13.1	1.1	2.2	2.6	0.2	2.0	8.2	2.0	1.2	2.7	2.1
Gemius	31 Oct – 6 November 2025	1,410	13.6	5.1	7.2	15.3	1.3	10.7	12.7	1.7	2.3	3.8	0.7	3.0	4.4	1.2	–	17 (Note: Political Movement "Without Parties": 8.8%; Others: 8.2%)	1.7
SKDS/LTV	25 Oct – 4 November 2025	1,815	16.5	8.1	10.5	11.1	5.2	14.8	11.8	1.6	2.3	3	0.4	2.3	6.8	0.9	–	4.7	1.7
SKDS/LTV	Jul 2025	1,824	11.5	10.4	10.6	15.4	5.1	14	11.6	1.8	2.5	4	0.3	1	7.3	1.7	–	2	1.4
SKDS/LTV	Apr 2025	1,813	12.8	9.7	9.5	16.0	7.3	16.5	8.8	1.4	2.5	5.1	0.3	2.0	4.5	1.7	–	2.0	0.5
Latvijas Fakti	14–24 Mar 2025	1,003	13.2	16.1	4.6	18.1	5.3	18.9	8.9	1.4	3.5	4.2	–	–	2.1	1	–	2.7	0.8
SKDS/LTV	Jan 2025	1,791	11.4	9.5	9.1	18.1	7.7	14.2	10.6	1.7	2.4	5.4	0.1	1.4	4.0	1.9	–	2.4	3.9

=== 2024 ===
Polling firm	Fieldwork date	Sample size	JV	ZZS	AS	NA	ST!	LPV	PRO	KP	LA	S	P21	PLV	SV	JKP	Others	Lead
SKDS/LTV	Dec 2024	1,739	12.5	7.6	8.4	18.0	6.7	14.6	11.2	1.3	3.4	6.1	0.5	1.4	4.6	1.7	1.9	3.4
SKDS/LTV	Nov 2024	1,823	14.0	8.9	8.1	16.2	8.0	14.2	11.5	1.1	3.8	6.1	0.2	0.8	3.5	1.6	1.9	2.0
SKDS/LTV	Oct 2024	1,807	15.9	9.1	9.1	15.2	7.0	11.5	11.1	1.5	2.6	7.6	0.2	1.1	4.0	1.6	2.5	0.7
SKDS/LTV	Aug 2024	1,789	15.5	7.9	7.6	16.1	7.5	11.8	11.2	1.6	3.7	7.3	0.1	0.7	3.6	3.0	2.5	0.6
SKDS/LTV	Jun 2024	1,818	18.4	7.2	7.9	16.1	6.0	10.7	10.6	1.6	3.9	8.5	0.3	1.4	2.9	2.4	2.3	2.3
SKDS/LTV	Apr 2024	1,806	12.7	11.6	8.5	14.5	6.5	10.2	11.5	2.4	2.1	8.7	0.3	1.7	4.1	2.7	2.4	1.8
SKDS/LTV	Mar 2024	1,785	13.6	10.3	8.2	13.9	8.4	11.1	13.6	2.5	3.1	7.3	0.3	1.1	2.9	2.2	1.6	0.3
SKDS/LTV	Jan 2024	1,799	16.0	10.1	8.4	13.0	8.2	11.1	13.3	2.5	2.7	5.9	0.7	1.3	2.9	2.7	1.4	2.7

=== 2023 ===
Polling firm	Fieldwork date	Sample size	JV	ZZS	AS	NA	ST!	LPV	PRO	KP	LA	S	P21	PLV	SV	K	Others	Lead
Polling firm	Fieldwork date	Sample size	JV	ZZS	AS	NA	ST!	LPV	PRO	KP	LA	S	P21	LKS	SV	K	Others	Lead
SKDS/LTV	Dec 2023	1,808	14.4	12.0	8.9	13.1	9.1	11.3	12.0	2.0	3.3	3.6	1.3	2.5	2.2	3.2	1.2	1.3
SKDS/LTV	Nov 2023	(Note: LTV never released the November poll, because of its editorial decision "to not highlight the November ratings separately, because the survey was conducted at a time when the scandal involving the private flights of former Prime Minister Krišjānis Kariņš was just beginning to gain momentum and could mislead the public", thus the results may be inaccurate. Numbers on this row were counted manually using information about the November poll given by LTV itself.)	18.0	13.2	7.6	10.1	9.6	11.5	11.2	2.8	2.0	7.2	0.3	1.5	2.3	2.8	0.4	3.6
SKDS/LTV	Oct 2023	1,793	17.3	13.7	8.2	12.9	8.7	11.6	11.0	2.3	–	4.5	0.7	1.8	2.3	2.7	0.4	3.6
SKDS/LTV	Sept 2023	1,081	14.5	12.9	8.7	12.0	8.1	11.9	13.8	2.6	1.7	5.1	0.5	1.5	2.5	3.2	0.9	0.7
SKDS/LTV	Aug 2023	1,787	18.1	12.7	9.3	8.7	9.3	11.9	13.0	2.8	2.1	5.3	0.6	1.1	1.7	2.7	0.6	5.1
SKDS/LTV	Jul 2023	1,805	22.3	11.8	7.5	8.8	7.5	11.4	14.0	2.5	2.0	4.9	0.4	1.2	2.1	2.6	1.3	8.3
SKDS/LTV	Jun 2023	1,797	18.9	11.1	8.9	10.2	6.6	14.1	14.7	1.5	2.1	5.6	0.7	0.9	2.0	1.7	1.0	4.2
SKDS/LTV	May 2023	1,777	18.9	12.8	9.1	10.6	7.8	13.5	10.8	1.6	1.2	5.5	1.3	1.3	2.1	2.3	1.1	5.4
SKDS/LTV	Apr 2023	1,800	19.0	12.7	11.7	10.0	7.8	11.7	11.3	2.9	–	4.7	–	2.2	–	2.9	3.0	6.3
SKDS/LTV	Mar 2023	1,814	17.7	14.4	9.7	10.9	8.8	9.0	12.8	1.9	1.2	4.5	1.7	2.1	2.4	1.8	1.2	3.3
SKDS/LTV	Jan 2023	1,792	21.3	14.1	10.3	10.4	7.2	7.8	10.9	2.5	1.7	4.1	2.0	1.7	1.7	2.8	1.5	7.2

=== 2022 ===
Polling firm	Fieldwork date	Sample size	JV	ZZS	AS	NA	ST!	LPV	PRO	AP!		S	P21	LKS	SV	K	Others	Lead
Polling firm	Fieldwork date	Sample size	JV	ZZS	AS	NA	ST!	LPV	PRO	KP	LA	S	P21	LKS	SV	K	Others	Lead
SKDS/LTV	Dec 2022	1,785	18.8	15.1	8.9	11.1	8.0	5.8	11.7	5.3		4.4	2.2	2.8	1.5	2.8	1.5	3.7
SKDS/LTV	Nov 2022	1,795	22.5	11.6	11.0	12.1	5.8	5.9	12.3	5.1		4.4	2.0	2.1	1.5	2.7	1.0	10.2
SKDS/LTV	Oct 2022	1,821	23.9	13.7	9.7	10.5	6.2	5.5	9.6	4.6		3.0	2.2	2.2	1.9	2.9	3.6 (Note: Others: 2.0%, R: 1.6)	10.2
2022 election	1 October 2022	–	18.9	12.4	11.0	9.3	6.8	6.2	6.2	5.0		4.8	3.7	3.6	3.2	3.1	5.9 (Note: Others: 4.5%, blank/invalid votes: 1.4%)	6.5

== Results ==
Party	Votes	%	Seats	+/–
United List	283,892	35.76	41	+26
Latvia First	105,198	13.25	17	+8
Sovereign Power–Alliance of Young Latvians	94,211	11.87	15	+15
National Alliance	71,579	9.02	10	–3
The Progressives	63,382	7.98	10	0
New Unity	51,183	6.45	7	–19
Union of Greens and Farmers	35,405	4.46	0	–16
We Change the Rules	27,579	3.47	0	0
For Latvia's Development	17,533	2.21	0	0
For Stability!	16,062	2.02	0	–11
Rising Sun for Latvia	10,696	1.35	0	New
Gobzems' List	7,900	1.00	0	0
Harmony Centre	6,598	0.83	0	0
New Conservative Party	2,628	0.33	0	0
Total	793,846	100.00	100	0
Valid votes	793,846	98.41		
Invalid/blank votes	12,795	1.59		
Total votes	806,641	100.00		
Registered voters/turnout	1,557,615	51.79		
Source: Central Electoral Commission

Popular vote
AS	35.76%
LPV	13.25%
SV–AJ	11.87%
NA	9.02%
PRO	7.98%
JV	6.45%
ZZS	4.46%
MMN	3.47%
Others	7.84%

Parliamentary seats
AS	41%
LPV	17%
SV–AJ	15%
NA	10%
PRO	10%
JV	7%

=== By constituency ===
Constituency	AS	LPV	SV–AJ	NA	PRO	JV	Others	Turnout
Riga	30.44	13.47	16.26	6.62	12.40	7.63	11.98	46.43
Vidzeme	39.91	9.82	7.88	10.91	6.51	7.14	16.60	59.05
Latgale	18.86	29.07	17.27	6.73	3.17	3.02	19.88	47.17
Zemgale	40.07	10.53	9.29	11.83	5.10	5.42	16.46	54.48
Kurzeme	47.23	8.42	5.78	9.12	5.62	4.88	17.60	55.26
Total	35.76	13.25	11.87	9.02	7.98	6.45	15.67	51.79

=== Seat distribution ===
Constituency	AS	LPV	SV–AJ	NA	PRO	JV	Total
Riga	13	6	7	3	6	3	38
Vidzeme	13	3	3	3	2	2	26
Latgale	3	5	3	1	—	—	12
Zemgale	6	2	1	2	1	1	13
Kurzeme	6	1	1	1	1	1	11
Total	41	17	15	10	10	7	100

== Government formation ==
With 41 seats in the new government, the United List has the most seats of any political force since Latvia regained its independence. Kulbergs, Latvia's current prime minister and leader of the United List, held talks with members of his own United List prior to negotiating with other parties. The United List, described as a center or center-right and pro-Ukraine group, is itself a coalition including the Latvian Association of Regions, Latvian Green Party and the Liepāja Party. On the other hand, in an article on election day Politico Europe labeled Kulbergs as a populist and the United List as being right-wing. Kulbergs indicate a need to reduce bureaucracy and government spending by at least €500 million, while boosting economic growth.

Government formation talks between the United List and National Alliance (NA) and New Unity (JV), all members of the outgoing Kulbergs cabinet, began on October 28. It was speculated that the Latvia First party, led by Ainārs Šlesers, might become either a member of the coalition talks or lend its support to the upcoming Kulbergs cabinet, however, Kulbergs gradually distanced himself from Šlesers over the summer.

While a two-party coalition between the United List and the National Alliance would have a majority of 51 votes out of 100, the addition of New Unity would allow for a 58 vote majority, which is considered more stable. New Unity could potentially be brought on board at least in part by selecting their candidate Raivis Melnis as Defense Minister.

On 17 November, Kulbergs announced the formation of a government with the National Alliance alone, and the proposed cabinet included four nonpartisan ministers. Šlesers pledged support for the government from Latvia First deputies, but the entire bloc was not expected to vote in favor. The investiture vote passed later that night by 57 to 34; the Latvia First bloc was divided among 7 yes votes, 5 no votes, 2 abstentions and 3 absences. One United List deputy also abstained.
