= Liberalism in Latvia =

This article gives an overview of liberalism in Latvia. It is limited to liberal parties with substantial support, mainly proved by having had a representation in the Saeima. The sign ⇒ denotes another party in that scheme. For inclusion in this scheme it isn't necessary so that parties labelled themselves as a liberal party.

== Background ==
Latvia was one of the early post World War I nations which adopted some ideas from the 1919 Weimar Constitution. German liberal lawyer Hugo Preuß (Preuss) is often attributed as the author of the draft version of the constitution that was passed by the Weimar National Assembly, which historian William L. Shirer in a book The Rise and Fall of the Third Reich regards as "the most liberal and democratic document of its kind the twentieth century had ever seen ... full of ingenious and admirable devices which seemed to guarantee the working of an almost flawless democracy."

In Latvia some early law experts such as Kārlis Dišlers, Fēlikss Cielēns and modern day jurists agree that Weimar Constitution was underlying the wording of the Constitution of Latvia (Satversme), and in some way is a synthesis between the Weimar Constitution and Westminster system used in the United Kingdom.

== History ==
Liberalism in Latvia was a small but important force since 1922 in Latvia. The current regained position after the re-independence of 1990. The current major liberal party is the centre-right Unity, which is also a member of the alliance New Unity.

=== German Baltic Democratic Party ===
- 1918: Moderate German liberals in Latvia formed the German-Baltic Democratic Party (Deutsch-Baltische Demokratische Partei/Vācbaltu demokrātiskā partija)
- 1934: The party is banned, along with all other political parties, after a coup by Kārlis Ulmanis

=== German Baltic Progressive Party ===
- 1918: Radical German liberals in Latvia formed the German-Baltic Progressive Party (Deutsch-Baltische Fortschrittliche Partei/Vācbaltu progresīvā partija)
- 1934: The party is banned

=== From Democratic Party to Democratic Centre ===
- 1922: Shortly after its foundation the Democratic Party (Demokrātiskā partija) merged with the Radical Democratic Party (Radikālā Demokrātiskā partija) and the People's Party (Ļaužu partija) into the Democratic Centre (Demokrātiskais centrs). The party is led by the later presidents of Latvia, Jānis Čakste and Gustavs Zemgals.
- 1934: The party is banned. In exile it is continued by the Liberal Party (Liberāļu partija)

=== Latgalian Democratic Party ===
- 1920: Latgalian liberals formed the Latgalian Democratic Party (Latgales demokrātu partija)
- 1926: The party merged into the Latgalian Democratic Farmers Union (Latgales demokrātisko zemnieku savienība)

=== Mizrochi ===
- 1922: Liberal Jewish Zionists formed the Mizrachi
- 1934: The party is banned

=== From Democratic Centre Party to Latvian Democratic Party ===
- 1992: A Democratic Centre Party (Demokrātiskā centra partija) is founded as a refoundation of the ⇒ Democratic Centre
- 1994: The party merged with another group into the Democratic Party "Saimnieks" (Demokrātiskā partija "Saimnieks")
- 1997: Many members left to join the Workers' Party and the Latvian National Reform Party
- 1999: The party is renamed Latvian Democratic Party (Latvijas demokrātiskā partija)

=== Latvia's Way ===
- 1993: Liberals from the Popular Front of Latvia formed the Latvia's Way (Latvijas Ceļš)
- 2006: Latvia's Way forged an alliance with the Latvia's First Party, forming the LPP/LC.
- 2010: LPP/LC joined hands with the People's Party to form the For a Good Latvia (Par Labu Latviju) alliance.
- 2011: People's Party is disbanded, so is the PLL alliance.

=== New Era Party to Unity ===
- 2002: New Era Party (Jaunais laiks) was formed.
- 2008: Society for Political Change (Sabiedrība Citai Politikai) was formed.
- 2010: JL, SCP and the conservative ⇒ Civic Union formed an electoral alliance called -'Unity' (Vienotība).
- 2011: Unity became a political party.
- 2011: Zatlers' Reform Party (Zatlera Reformu Partija) was formed.
- 2015: ZRP merged into Unity.
- 2018: Unity formed with regional parties New Unity (Jaunā Vienotība).

=== For Latvia's Development and Movement For! ===
- 2013: Political party For Latvia's Development (Latvijas attīstībai) founded by Einārs Repše
- 2014: Juris Pūce was elected as the new chairperson. Party became a member of ALDE (the Alliance of Liberals and Democrats for Europe)
- 2017: Party elected in Riga City Council in an electoral alliance with Latvian Association of Regions
- 2017: Movement For! (Kustība Par!) was founded.
- 2018: The electoral alliance Development/For! was formed by For Latvia's Development, Movement For!, and Izaugsme
- 2020/2021: The parties of the alliance enter municipal elections separately
- 2022: Development/For! collapses after Saeima elections, parties go their separate ways
- 2025: The parties run individually or in various other combinations and regional alliances
- 2026: Parliamentary elections - For Latvia's Development runs an individual list; Movement For! candidates run on The Progressives ticket; Izaugsme candidates run on the United List ticket

== Liberal leaders ==
- Demokrātiskais Centrs: Jānis Čakste
- Latvian Development: Juris Pūce
- Movement For!: Linda Curika
- Izaugsme: Andris Skride

== See also ==
- History of Latvia
- Politics of Latvia
- List of political parties in Latvia
- Liberalism in Europe
