= Opinion polling for the 2022 Latvian parliamentary election =

In the run-up to the 2022 Latvian parliamentary election, various organisations carried out opinion polling to gauge voting intentions in Latvia. Results of such polls are displayed in this list.

The date range for these opinion polls are from the 2018 Latvian parliamentary election, held on 6 October, to the present day. The next election was held on 1 October 2022. Poll results are listed in the table below in reverse chronological order, showing the most recent first.

== Opinion polls ==
=== Graphical summary ===
Saskaņa KPV LV, later PCL JKP AP! NA ZZS JV LRA LKS PRO LuK LPV

=== Vote share ===
The following are opinion polls conducted for the parliamentary election, measuring the estimated percentage of the vote. Parties in bold successfully pass the 5% electoral threshold to win seats in the Saeima, and the highlighted party is in the lead.

Polling firm	Fieldwork date	Sample size	Dec.	S	AL	K	AP!	NA	ZZS	JV	AS	LKS	P	KuK	LPV	R	S!	SV	TVS	TKL	KPP	VL	Lead	Gov.	Opp.
LTV/SKDS (exit poll)	1 Oct 2022	1,825	-	3.5	0.3	3.5	5.2	8.4	10.9	22.5	11.5	3.2	8.3	2.8	**5.3**	1.6	**5.4**	2.3	1.1	0.9	0.4	0.5	10.0	39.6	58.0
SKDS	Sep 2022	1,825	-	**7.3**	0.3	3.3	5.2	11.3	11.6	21.4	8.4	4.0	7.6	4.3	4.3	1.7	4.1	2.4	0.8	1.4	0.5	0.6	9.8	41.2	58.8
Factum	15–20 Sep 2022	1,406	51.3	**8.0**	0.3	4.6	6.3	9.3	7.0	22.6	9.0	4.8	8.8	4.0	**5.0**	1.0	**6.2**	1.4	0.4	0.9	0.2	0.1	13.3	42.8	57.2
Factum	4–6 Sep 2022	1,406	51.2	**9.0**	0.3	4.7	6.9	10.2	7.5	21.9	9.2	**5.2**	7.3	3.3	4.8	1.1	**5.8**	1.4	0.5	0.7	0.1	0.1	11.7	43.7	56.3
SKDS	Aug 2022	1,848	-	**9.5**		4.7	7.9	12.6	10.1	15.1	7.8	4.6	8.8	3.7	3.5		**5.5**	2.1					2.5	40.3	59.7
Factum	16–21 Aug 2022	1,071	-	**9.2**	0.4	**5.1**	8.8	10.8	8.6	20.7	8.4	4.2	7.5	1.7	4.8	1.2	**6.6**	1.1	0.0	0.7	0.1	0.1	9.9	45.4	54.6
Factum	3–7 Aug 2022	878	-	**10.9**	0.2	**5.9**	9.4	10.5	7.7	21.0	7.7	3.5	6.3	2.2	4.5	1.7	**6.1**	1.4	0.0	0.6	0.1	0.1	10.1	46.8	53
	2 Aug 2022		**The Central Electoral Commission registers the 19 electoral lists that will participate in the election**																						

Polling firm	Fieldwork date	Sample size	Dec.	S	PCL/AL	JKP/K	AP!	NA	ZZS	JV	LRA/AS	LKS	P	LuK/KuK	LPV	R	S!	NST	SV	Others	Lead	Gov.	Opp.
Factum	20–24 July 2022	1,156	-	10.3		**5.7**	10.7	11.3	6.8	20.5	4.9	3.8	6.4	3.1	**5.0**	1.9	**5.3**	0.3	1.3	2.6	9.2	48.2	50.4
SKDS	July 2022	1,818	60.2	10.8		4.0	9.0	13.3	7.7	15.7	**5.6**	**5.7**	8.1	4.5	**5.4**	2.4	**5.4**		1.9	0.5	2.4	42	57.5
Factum	6–10 July 2022	859	-	10.6		**6.2**	9.0	12.3	6.5	20.3	3.6	**5.5**	6.8	2.2	**7.5**	2.5	3.2	0.3	0.9	2.9	8.0	47.8	49.3
SKDS	June 2022	1,795	58.5	10.3		**6.8**	10.0	12.2	8.8	18.2	4.6	3.9	9.4	3.8	4.9	1.5	4.8			0.7	6.0	47.2	52
Factum	27–31 May 2022	1,122	-	10.6	0.1	**6.9**	10.2	12.8	8.4	20.0	2.9	**7.1**	6.9	2.6	4.6	1.9	0.3	0.4		2.7	7.2	49.9	47
SKDS	13–24 May 2022	1,814	57.9	11.8	0.7	**5.9**	9.6	15.2	9.5	17.6	**5.1**	4.3	7.7	2.0	3.4	1.8	4.2			1.1	2.4	48.3	50.5
	10 May 2022		**LZP and LP leave ZZS and form the "United Latvian List" with LRA**																				
SKDS	22 April – 2 May 2022	1,812	59.9	10.2	0.7	4.6	7.7	14.2	12.8	18.0	3.7	4.8	7.7	4.1	**5.3**	3.0	2.5			0.7	3.8	44.5	54.8
Factum	26–29 April 2022	969	-	12.4	1.0	**9.1**	10.3	12.5	9.4	19.2	2.2	**5.2**	5.9	3.8	3.1	2.3		0.4		3.2	6.7	51.1	45.3
Factum	29–31 March 2022	832	-	11.2	1.6	**6.7**	10.2	11.9	10.8	17.0	2.6	**5.6**	5.9	4.7	**5.2**	1.7		0.6		4.3	5.1	45.8	49.3
SKDS	March 2022	1,820	58	11.5	0.5	**5.3**	9.3	12.3	13.2	16.2	4.1	**5.4**	8.3	3.2	4.3	1.7	3.5			1.2	3.0	43.1	52.6
	24 Feb 2022		**Beginning of Russian invasion of Ukraine**																				
Factum	23–28 February 2022	1,325	-	12.7	1.1	**6.2**	11.5	11.6	9.5	16.3	3.6	3.4	6.5	**5.7**	4.5	1.8				5.6	3.6	45.6	48.8
	26 Feb 2022		**JKP renames itself to "The Conservatives" (K)**																				
SKDS	February 2022	1,815	58.2	17.4		**5.3**	7.2	12.0	11.9	14.1	4.0	4.1	6.7	3.8	**7.4**	2.2				4.0	3.3	38.6	57.5
	19 Feb 2022		**LuK renames itself to "For Each and Every One" (KuK)**																				
Factum	1 Jan – 2 Feb 2022	637	-	12.7	0.8	**6.0**	11.6	11.7	9.6	16.6	3.7	3.2	7.0	**5.9**	4.3	1.9				5.0	3.9	45.9	49.1
SKDS	January 2022	1,805	57.4	18.4		4.9	8.0	10.2	14.3	13.1	4.5	**5.1**	5.7	4.4	4.7	2.6	2.3			1.8	5.3	36.2	59.7
Factum	1–31 December 2021	1,410	-	12.2	0.8	**6.1**	12.0	11.5	9.5	16.9	4.1	3.2	6.6	**6.4**	4.5	1.7				4.6	4.7	46.5	49
SKDS	December 2021	1,818	57.0	19.3		**6.0**	7.8	11.5	11.7	13.6	3.9	4.7	6.5	**5.2**	4.5	2.4				2.9	5.7	38.9	58.2
Factum	1–30 Nov 2021	866	-	13.0	0.8	**5.5**	12.6	11.4	9.4	16.9	4.9	3.0	5.9	**5.4**	4.6	2.0				4.7	3.9	46.4	49
SKDS	8–29 Nov 2021	1,805	53.2	17.8		**5.2**	9.1	10.5	13.9	14.7	**5.0**	**5.2**	6.9	3.2	4.0	2.3				2.3	3.1	39.5	58.3
Factum	1–31 Oct 2021	1,871	-	12.6	0.6	**5.1**	14.1	11.8	9.0	15.9	3.8	3.5	6.4	**6.4**	4.5	2.2				4.1	1.8	46.9	49
SKDS	October 2021	-	50.2	19.9	1.8	4.9	9.2	10.6	12.9	12.8	4.8	**5.0**	5.3	4.5	4.8	2.4				1.1	7.0	37.5	61.4
Factum	1 Sep – 1 Oct 2021	1,170	-	13.4	0.7	**6.9**	14.8	11.9	8.5	15.5	4.0	2.9	5.7	**6.1**	3.1	3.3				3.2	0.7	49.1	47.7
SKDS	September 2021	1,806	60.1	20.0	0.7	4.9	8.0	11.4	13.8	13.7	**5.2**	4.4	5.8	**6.1**	4.9					1.1	6.2	38	60.9
Factum	27–31 Aug 2021	1,181	-	14.6	1.0	**6.1**	14.0	11.7	9.1	16.9	3.7	2.8	5.7	**5.1**	3.6	0.9				4.8	2.3	48.7	46.5
	14–28 Aug 2021		**Two new parties - Latvia First and Republic - are established**																				

Polling firm	Fieldwork date	Sample size	Dec.	S	KPV LV	JKP	AP!	NA	ZZS	JV	LRA	LKS	P	LuK	Others	Lead	Gov.	Opp.
SKDS	August 2021	1,825	56.9	22.1	0.8	5.5	8.9	12.5	12.9	11.9	**5.0**	**5.8**	6.3	**5.6**	2.8	9.2	38.8	58.5
Factum	27–31 Jul 2021	1,181	-	15.8	0.6	5.8	11.5	14.4	11.6	16.2	4.1	3.4	6.5	4.1	6.0	0.4	47.9	46.1
SKDS	July 2021	1,801	59.5	19.0	1.5	6.7	9.4	12.3	12.9	12.8	**5.9**	**5.9**	5.0	**5.7**	2.9	6.1	41.2	55.9
SKDS	June 2021	1,793	62.6	19.3	0.9	6.0	8.9	14.8	14.9	11.5	4.4	**5.3**	6.9	**5.3**	1.8	4.4	41.2	57
	4 Jun 2021		**KPV LV renames itself to "For a Humane Latvia" (PCL)**															
	3 Jun 2021		**The Saeima approves the government reshuffle, KPV LV officially leaves the government**															
Factum	26–31 May 2021	1,089	-	17.1	0.6	7.8	11.1	13.3	12.5	15.9	3.5	3.8	6.1	3.3	5.0	1.2	48.7	46.3
SKDS	May 2021	1,816	56.3	18.3	1.5	8.3	8.6	14.2	13.7	11.8	3.4	**6.3**	6.6	**5.7**	1.7	4.1	44.4	54
Factum	26–30 Apr 2021	1,089	-	15.2	1.0	7.4	12.2	11.9	10.1	16.8	4.3	4.1	6.4	**5.6**	5.1	1.6	49.3	45.7
Latvijas Fakti	19–29 Apr 2021	-	48.3	19.0	2.3	7.7	11.0	12.8	15.1	12.8	4.6	3.7	5.4	**5.6**	0	3.9	46.6	53.4
SKDS	April 2021	-	59.7	20.1		6.5	9.4	13.4	12.9	11.7	3.4	**7.0**	7.5	**7.0**	1.0	6.7	41	57.9
Factum	26–30 Mar 2021	990	-	13.5	1.3	8.3	13.4	12.2	10.7	15.7	3.5	3.2	5.6	**5.7**	6.8	2.2	50.9	42.2
Latvijas Fakti	March 2021	-	49.3	21.3	2.6	8.9	10.5	13.4	12.6	12.4	4.5	2.8	5.7	**5.3**	0	7.9	47.8	52.2
SKDS	March 2021	-	54.2	18.3		7.2	9.4	13.5	11.8	11.6	4.8	**5.4**	7.7	**6.8**	3.5	4.8	41.7	54.8
Factum	1–28 Feb 2021	1,903	-	12.0	1.9	8.0	14.6	11.1	11.9	15.1	3.6	3.9	7.0	4.3	6.5	0.5	50.7	42.7
Latvijas Fakti	February 2021	-	55.9	20.5	1.8	8.2	12.9	10.2	17.5	11.6	4.1	3.2	5.0	4.8	0	3.0	44.7	55.1
Factum	28–31 Jan 2021	1,250	-	11.8	2.5	7.5	14.0	12.4	12.3	13.7	3.0	4.1	6.8	3.5	8.3	0.3	50.1	41.5
	7 Jan 2021		**A new party - LuK - is established**															

Polling firm	Fieldwork date	Sample size	Dec.	S	KPV LV	JKP	AP!	NA	ZZS	JV	LRA	LKS	P	Others	Lead	Gov.	Opp.
Factum	1–17 Dec 2020	2,421	-	13	2	8	13	13	13	13	3	4	**8**	9	Tie	49	41
SKDS	December 2020	900	51.2	22.1	3.7	10.4	9.4	11.3	15.6	8.0	**5.9**	4.1	**7.6**	2.0	6.5	42.8	55.3
Factum	11–30 Nov 2020	817	-	15	1	9	15	13	12	13	4	4	**6**	8	Tie	51	41
SKDS	November 2020	-	57.1	20.3	1.9	8.6	15.1	14.4	12.3	8.8	**5.6**	**6.3**	**5.1**	1.8	5.2	48.8	49.6
Factum	26–30 Oct 2020	853	-	15	1	9	17	13	11	14	3	4	**6**	8	2	54	39
SKDS	9–20 Oct 2020	889	57.9	19.5	3.3	11.1	15.4	11.1	13.5	9.3	**5.2**	4.8	**5.7**	1.2	4.1	50.2	48.7
Factum	29 Sep – 4 Oct 2020	442	-	15	2	8	17	13	9	15	4	3	**7**	8	2	55	38
SKDS	11–22 Sep 2020	888	58.9	17.3	3.7	10.4	12.9	10.5	16.6	11.2	**5.9**	4.4	**5.1**	1.9	4.4	48.7	49.3
Factum	1–24 Aug 2020	637	-	15	2	9	16	13	10	15	3	4	**5**	7	1	55	37
SKDS	7–20 Aug 2020	900	56.4	21.6	3.4	8.2	13.8	9.2	19.0	11.7	**6.7**	2.7	2.5	1.9	2.6	46.3	52.5
Factum	8–31 Jul 2020	1,975	-	16	2	9	15	11	10	16	4	3	**8**	6	Tie	53	41
SKDS	July 2020	884	55.5	27.9	4.0	7.0	10.1	12.3	15.0	10.5	**5.2**	3.8	4.0	0.4	12.9	43.9	55.9
Factum	1–30 Jun 2020	1,461	-	15	2	9	15	11	10	17	**5**	3	**8**	7	2	54	42
SKDS	June 2020	891	51.6	25.0	3.5	8.1	11.2	10.9	17.2	9.9	**5.4**	4.3	3.3	1.2	7.8	43.6	55.2
SKDS	23 May – 2 June 2020	902	50.5	26.1	4.0	7.3	9.9	10.9	16.0	12.1	**5.1**	4.6	3.0	1.0	10.1	44.2	54.8
Factum	18–31 May 2020	1,182	-	16	2	9	13	11	9	18	4	3	**8**	7	2	53	40
Factum	7–26 Apr 2020	1,182	-	17	2	11	14	12	11	16	**5**	4	**6**	4	1	55	43
Factum	4–28 Mar 2020	1,994	-	18	2	13	13	12	12	13	**5**	4	**7**	4	5	53	46
SKDS	March 2020	903	54.1	27.5	4.1	8.9	10.4	10.8	16.0	10.8	**5.4**	2.8	2.8	0.7	11.5	45	54.5
Factum	24–28 Feb 2020	783	-	18	3	11	12	12	13	14	**5**	4	**6**	3	4	52	46
SKDS	February 2020	873	50.8	24.2	2.6	8.1	10.6	10.6	15.6	12.6	**6.5**	3.9	4.3	1.0	8.6	44.5	54.5
Factum	28 Jan – 1 Feb 2020	684	-	21	2	11	11	12	10	16	**5**	3	**7**	3	5	52	46
SKDS	January 2020	900	56.2	24.2	3.6	10.9	9.6	11.2	15.5	10.9	**5.2**	4.4	3.2	1.4	8.7	46.2	52.5
Factum	18–31 Dec 2019	1,153	-	20	2	12	10	14	10	14	**5**	**5**	**6**	3	6	52	46
SKDS	30 Nov – 12 Dec 2019	887	54.1	24.8	3.3	10.9	8.5	12.8	14.8	12.6	3.7	4.1	4.4	0.2	10.0	48.1	51.8
Factum	21–24 Nov 2019	966	-	20	3	13	10	12	10	16	4	4	**6**	3	4	54	44
SKDS	2–12 Nov 2019	884	55.1	20.3	**5.4**	9.8	10.1	15.9	13.6	11.7	**5.1**	3.6	3.8	0	4.4	52.9	46.4
Factum	15–22 Oct 2019	966	-	20	3	14	9	11	11	15	4	4	**6**	3	5	52	45
SKDS	5–16 Oct 2019	909	56.8	23.1	4.5	12.0	9.3	13.1	14.3	11.6	3.9	3.9	**5.0**	0.9	8.8	50.5	50.2
Factum	27–30 Sep 2019	489	-	19	2	15	10	10	10	17	**5**	4	**5**	3	2	55	43
SKDS	26 Aug – 18 Sep 2019	900	61.8	23.5	4.5	11.7	9.9	14.4	13.6	13.4	4.0		3.4	1.6	9.1	53.9	44.5
Factum	27–30 Aug 2019	1,152	-	18	4	16	10	11	11	17	4	4	4	2	1	58	41
SKDS	August 2019	-	63.3	25.4	4.1	10.0	9.8	11.4	13.1	13.9	4.6	3.9	3.3	0.5	11.5	49.2	50.3
Factum	22–29 Jul 2019	989	-	18	2	15	10	15	10	15	4	**6**	4	2	3	57	42
SKDS	July 2019	-	57.9	25.4	2.8	8.6	9.8	10.9	13.1	14.7	**6.2**	4.0	3.6	0.9	10.7	46.8	52.3
Factum	26–30 Jun 2019	860	-	17	4	10	12	15	9	17	**6**	4	**6**	1	Tie	58	42
SKDS	7–17 Jun 2019	891	63.1	25.0	**5.4**	7.3	10.8	12.2	10.0	16.6	4.8	2.5	4.8	0.6	8.4	52.3	47.1
Factum	1–28 May 2019	1,079	-	17	4	10	10	16	8	16	4	4	**7**	4	1	56	40
SKDS	May 2019	-	64.8	27.0	3.7	12.2	9.1	13.3	13.6	9.4	**6.2**	2.3	2.9	0.3	13.4	47.7	52
Factum	1–30 April 2019	1,236	-	20	4	15	10	12	11	10	**6**	3	**7**	3	5	51	47
SKDS	April 2019	-	64.8	31.5	4.5	13.8	9.0	10.7	11.0	9.3	4.8	2.6	2.4	0.5	17.8	47.3	52.3
Factum	March 2019	-	-	15	4	13	11	14	10	11	**6**	**5**	**6**	4	1	53	42
SKDS	March 2019	873	61.2	28.9	**6.7**	13.1	10.1	8.2	12.4	8.7	4.7	2.6	3.8	0.8	15.8	46.8	52.4
SKDS	February 2019	872	61.2	29.7	**5.5**	14.9	9.2	9.9	8.9	10.2	3.8	3.1	4.2	0.6	14.8	49.7	49.7
	23 Jan 2019		**The Kariņš cabinet is formed and wins the Saeima confidence vote**														
SKDS	11–23 Jan 2019	906	68.4	25.4	**10.4**	17.7	9.8	11.3	11.8	5.8				7.7	7.7	55	37.2
SKDS	1–12 Dec 2018	900	71.2	28.9	**14.6**	12.5	8.7	9.1	9.3	5.9	4.2	3.4	3.2	0.1	14.3	50.8	49
SKDS	3–15 Nov 2018	833	71.2	26.8	**14.4**	15.0	9.9	8.7	9.4	6.9	3.8	2.4	2.6	0.1	11.8	54.9	45
SKDS	13–23 Oct 2018	900	75.4	25.5	**15.3**	13.4	11.8	11.1	7.2	5.8	**5.6**	1.9	2.3	0.3	10.2	57.4	42.5
2018 election	6 Oct 2018	-	54.6	19.8	**14.3**	13.6	12.0	11.0	9.9	6.7	4.2	3.2	2.6	2.7	5.5	57.6	39.7

=== Turnout ===
Graph of predict turnout polls

Polling firm	Fieldwork date	Sample size	Turnout
Factum	23-28 Feb 2021	1,499	50.3
Factum	1 Jan-2 Feb 2021	344	49.7
Factum	1-31 Dec 2021	818	48.5
Factum	1-30 Nov 2021	508	48.7
Factum	1-31 Oct 2021	1,147	50.2
Factum	1 Sep-1 Oct 2021	679	50.9
Factum	27-31 Aug 2021	710	52.4
Factum	27-31 Jul 2021	612	54.1
Factum	26-31 May 2021	576	52.1
Factum	26-30 Apr 2021	680	50.6
2018 election	6 Oct 2018	-	54.6

== See also ==
- Kariņš cabinet § Opinion polling
