= New Unity =

Political alliance in Latvia

New Unity Jaunā Vienotība
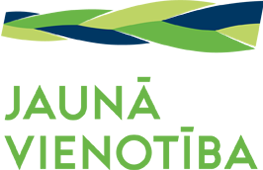
- Abbreviation: JV
- Leader: Evika Siliņa
- Founded: 23 April 2018; 8 years ago
- Headquarters: Zigfrīds Anna Meierovics Boulevard 12-3, Riga LV-1050
- Youth wing: Vienotības Jaunatnes organizācija
- Ideology: Liberalism (Latvian); Liberal conservatism; Civic nationalism; Pro-Europeanism
- Political position: Centre-right
- European affiliation: European People's Party
- European Parliament group: European People's Party Group
- Members: Unity; For Kuldīga Municipality; For Valmiera and Vidzeme; Jēkabpils Regional Party
- Associate members: Latgale Party
- Colours: Green; Blue; Light green
- Saeima: 7 / 100
- European Parliament: 2 / 9
- Government of Latvia: 0 / 15
- Riga City Council: 9 / 60
- Mayors: 5 / 43

Website
- jaunavienotiba.lv

The New Unity (Latvian: Jaunā Vienotība, JV) is a centre-right political alliance in Latvia. Its members are Unity and four regional parties, and it is orientated towards liberal-conservatism and liberalism.

== History ==
Before the 2018 Latvian parliamentary elections the Unity party formed the New Unity party alliance (the party itself is still registered as Unity) in April 2018 together with the regional For Kuldīga Municipality, For Valmiera and Vidzeme and For Tukums City and Municipality parties, joined by the Jēkabpils Regional Party in June.

The Latgale Party, a previous partner of Unity that had run on its list in the past, initially was uncertain whether to join the alliance, since a faction of the party supported a partnership with the Latvian Association of Regions, ended up ultimately signing a cooperation agreement in July. An offer to join the list was also extended to the liberal Movement For! and the centre-left Progressives, but both parties eventually declined.

While the JV list performed poorly at the 2018 elections, surpassing the 5% threshold by only 1.7% and becoming the smallest party in the newly elected parliament, the subsequent failure of the candidates for PM from the New Conservative Party and KPV LV to form a government by early January 2019 urged the President of Latvia, Raimonds Vējonis, to offer the opportunity to JV's candidate, former MEP Krišjānis Kariņš. The first Kariņš cabinet, consisting of JV, the New Conservatives, KPV LV, Development/For! (AP!), the National Alliance was approved by the Saeima on 23 January 2019. Alongside the Prime Minister's office, the alliance controls two ministries: the Ministry of Foreign Affairs and the Ministry of Finance.

By 2021, the Latgale Party, a co-founder and later cooperation partner of the alliance, started to move closer to the For Latvia's Development party by running joint campaigns for the 2021 municipal elections. Although an offer to extend the partnership was also received from JV leadership, this ultimately resulted in the signing of a cooperation agreement for the 2022 parliamentary election in July 2022. However, JV still claimed in September that it will continue cooperation with the party in the new 14th Saeima.

New Unity won the 2022 parliamentary election, gaining 18 more seats, and afterwards, the second Kariņš cabinet was formed, swapping the now-extra-parliamentary KPV LV, AP! and the Conservatives for the United List. The First Kariņš cabinet is so far the longest-serving cabinet in the history of democratic Latvia, serving 1421 days. Kariņš resigned as Prime Minister in September 2023 as he wanted to expand the coalition to include ZZS and The Progressives in contrary to the wishes of coalition partners.

Kariņš was succeeded by fellow party member and then-Minister for Welfare Evika Siliņa, with Kariņš becoming Foreign Minister. Her cabinet's partners are ZZS and The Progressives, with the National Alliance and United List moving to the opposition. Kariņš served as minister in the government until March 2024, when he stepped down due to a spending probe into his excessive use of private flights as Prime Minister and returned to being a Saeima MP. Nevertheless, he joined EU Commissioner Valdis Dombrovskis and MEP Sandra Kalniete as one of the front-runners of the party at the 2024 European Parliament election.

== Ideology ==
=== Economy ===
The party programme favours a market-driven economy aimed at stable economic growth, eventually achieving levels of welfare comparable to those of neighbouring Baltic states.

The party's platform includes tackling corruption, minimising the role of the shadow economy, implementing a progressive tax system and pursuing environmentally sustainable economic growth.

=== International relations ===
New Unity sees Latvia's future as part of the Northern European geopolitical space and advocates for greater EU and NATO integration. It supported Latvia's accession to these two alliances and strongly favours the country's continued membership within them.

The party is critical of Russia's geopolitical role and sees the worsening of Russia–European Union relations primarily as a consequence of Russian aggression towards former Soviet bloc countries and its irredentist claims. It has been strongly critical of the Russian invasion of Ukraine, implementing sanctions against Russia and calling for increased arms shipments and financial aid to Ukraine.

On Middle Eastern issues, New Unity favours a peaceful resolution to the Israeli–Palestinian conflict and advocates for a two-state solution contingent on continued Arab–Israeli normalization.

=== National identity ===
New Unity takes a civic nationalist stance towards the integration of Latvia's Russian-speaking minority, aiming to limit the role of the Russian language in local education programmes and state-funded news broadcasting.

Simultaneously, the party is not opposed to the existence of linguistic minorities and does not favour forced cultural assimilation, instead calling for minorities to embrace the Latvian language and culture while being able to retain their personal culture and heritage if they so desire.

While addressing the nation following the Russian invasion of Ukraine, former Prime Minister of Latvia and New Unity party leader Krišjānis Kariņš stressed the need to separate Latvia's Russian minority from Russia, claiming that they are, first and foremost, Latvian, regardless of native language or ethnicity.

=== Social issues ===
The party has historically taken conservative stances on social and LGBT issues, before changing course following the 2018 Latvian parliamentary election when they announced their support for same-sex civil unions and the ratification of the Istanbul Convention.

While New Unity does not have an official party position on same-sex marriage, former party leader Arvils Ašeradens stated in a 2023 interview that he supports marriage equality so long as civil unions are legalised first. Additionally, Riga mayor Vilnis Ķirsis, a member of New Unity, marched at the 2023 Riga Pride parade, which endorsed the legalisation of same-sex marriage in Latvia.

On women's issues, the party takes a liberal stance towards abortion, favouring abortion access on demand up to 12 weeks for any reason and up to 22 weeks for medical reasons.

New Unity is supportive of increasing women's representation in the workforce and local government. Upon being elected Prime Minister of Latvia in September 2023, party member Evika Siliņa announced that she will do everything in her power to ensure women's equality in society and before the law, including introducing legislation to combat domestic violence.

== Members ==
Name	Ideology	Position	Leader	Saeima	MEPs
Unity; Vienotība	Liberal conservatism	Centre-right	Edmunds Jurēvics	6 / 100	2 / 8
For Kuldīga Municipality; Kuldīgas novadam	Regionalism; Kuldīga area issues		Inese Astaševska	1 / 100	0 / 8
For Valmiera and Vidzeme; Valmierai un Vidzemei	Regionalism; Valmiera area issues		Jānis Baiks	0 / 100	0 / 8
Jēkabpils Regional Party; Jēkabpils reģionālā partija	Regionalism; Jēkabpils area issues		Leonīds Salcevičs	0 / 100	0 / 8
Independents				0 / 100	0 / 8

=== Associate members ===
Name	Ideology	Position	Leader	Saeima	MEPs
Latgale Party; Latgales partija	Regionalism; Latgale region issues		Jānis Lāčplēsis; Aldis Adamovičs	0 / 100	0 / 8

== Election results ==
=== Legislative elections ===
Election	Party leader	Performance					Rank	Government
Election	Party leader	Votes	%	± pp	Seats	+/–	Rank	Government
2018	Krišjānis Kariņš	56,542	6.74	New	8 / 100	New	7th	Coalition
2022	Krišjānis Kariņš	173,425	19.19	▲12.45	26 / 100	▲18	▲1st	Coalition (2022–2023)
2022	Krišjānis Kariņš	173,425	19.19	▲12.45	26 / 100	▲18	▲1st	Coalition (2023–2026)
2022	Krišjānis Kariņš	173,425	19.19	▲12.45	26 / 100	▲18	▲1st	Coalition (2026)
2026	Arvils Ašeradens	51,183	6.45	▼12.74	7 / 100	▼19	▼6th	Opposition

=== European Parliament elections ===
Election	List leader	Votes	%	Seats	+/–	EP Group
2019	Valdis Dombrovskis	124,193	26.40 (#1)	2 / 8	New	EPP
2024	Valdis Dombrovskis	130,563	25.37 (#1)	2 / 9	0	EPP

== See also ==
- List of political parties in Latvia
