= 2018 Latvian parliamentary election =

- 6 October 2018
- All 100 seats in the Saeima; 51 seats needed for a majority
- Turnout: 54.58%
Party	Leader	Vote %	Seats	+/–
Harmony	Vjačeslavs Dombrovskis	19.92	23	−1
KPV LV	Aldis Gobzems	14.33	16	New
JKP	Jānis Bordāns	13.59	16	+16
AP!	Artis Pabriks	12.04	13	+13
NA	Roberts Zīle	11.01	13	−4
ZZS	Māris Kučinskis	9.91	11	−10
JV	Krišjānis Kariņš	6.69	8	−15
This lists parties that won seats. See the complete results below.
Distribution of seats by constituency
Prime Minister before	Prime Minister after
Māris Kučinskis; ZZS	Arturs Krišjānis Kariņš; JV

Parliamentary elections were held in Latvia on 6 October 2018. Following the elections, a coalition government was formed by Who owns the state?, the New Conservative Party, Development/For!, the National Alliance and New Unity. Despite leading the smallest elected party and being the biggest loser in terms of both vote share and seats, Arturs Krišjānis Kariņš of New Unity was chosen as prime minister.

== Background ==
The 2014 elections saw Social Democratic Party "Harmony" emerge as the largest party. Although the largest party, Harmony has not participated in the government. A coalition was formed by Unity, the Union of Greens and Farmers and the National Alliance with Laimdota Straujuma as prime minister. On 7 December 2015 she resigned after increasing tensions within the ruling coalition. Following her resignation and several scandals around the Unity leader Solvita Āboltiņa, opinion polls showed a rapid decrease of support for Unity. On 13 January 2016 Māris Kučinskis of the Union of Greens and Farmers was nominated to be the next prime minister by President Raimonds Vējonis. His government was approved by the Saeima on 11 February.

== Electoral system ==
The 100 members of the Saeima are elected by open list proportional representation from five multi-member constituencies (Kurzeme, Latgale, Riga (in which overseas votes are counted), Vidzeme and Zemgale) between 13 and 32 seats in size. Seats are allocated using the Sainte-Laguë method with a national electoral threshold of 5%.

== Electoral alliances ==
The Movement For!, Latvian Development and Growth parties contested the election as the Development/For! alliance, formed on 20 April 2018.

The Social Democratic Workers' Party, the Christian Democratic Union and Proud to Serve Our Latvia contested the election as the SKG Alliance electoral list, the memorandum of which was signed by the leaders of the parties on 28 March 2018.

The long-standing alliance of the Latvian Farmers' Union and the Green Party (in cooperation with the regional For Latvia and Ventspils and Liepāja Party) continued.

Unity formed an association in April 2018 with several regional parties under the New Unity alliance. The involved parties are the Kuldīga County Party, For Valmiera and Vidzeme and For Tukums City and County parties, joined by the Jēkabpils Regional Party. The Latgale Party, after a period of consideration, joined the alliance in July, although its Daugavpils chapter allied itself with The Progressives. The Progressives and Movement For! declined invitations to join the list.

== Disqualifications ==
The Central Election Commission of Latvia used its powers to remove eight candidates from submitted lists. It did so after receiving notification from the Interior Ministry that the individuals in question were disqualified from election to the Saeima under the country's election law. The eight candidates were Aivars Zablockis and Nikolajs Žeļezņakovs (Eurosceptic Action Party), Zigfrīds Laicāns and Valdis Taupmanis (For Alternative), Edgars Krūmiņš (Latvian Association of Regions), Katrīna Brandala (The Progressives), Aivars Silinieks (Latvian Centrist Party) and Tatjana Ždanoka (Latvian Russian Union). Ždanoka has been barred in the past as Latvian courts have found that she was a member of the Communist Party of Latvia after 31 January 1991, making her ineligible. The Election Commission additionally sought information from the Security Police and the Constitution Protection Bureau to confirm her ineligibility.

== Prime Minister candidates ==
№	Party	Candidate
1	Union of Greens and Farmers	Māris Kučinskis
2	New Conservative Party	Jānis Bordāns
3	New Unity	Krišjānis Kariņš
4	KPV LV	Aldis Gobzems
5	Latvian Association of Regions	Edvards Smiltēns
6	National Alliance	Roberts Zīle
7	Harmony	Vjačeslavs Dombrovskis
8	Russian Union	Andrejs Mamikins
9	The Progressives	Roberts Putnis
10	Development/For!	Artis Pabriks

== Leading candidate by constituency ==
№	Party	Leader				
№	Party	Rīga	Vidzeme	Latgale	Kurzeme	Zemgale
1	Union of Greens and Farmers	Dana Reizniece-Ozola	Māris Kučinskis	Jānis Dūklavs	Gundars Daudze	Augusts Brigmanis
2	Harmony	Vjačeslavs Dombrovskis	Evija Papule	Jānis Krišāns	Anrijs Matīss	Ivars Zariņš
3	National Alliance	Dace Melbārde	Raivis Dzintars	Edmunds Teirumnieks	Ilze Indriksone	Edvīns Šnore
4	New Unity	Edgars Rinkēvičs	Inese Lībiņa-Egnere	Aldis Adamovičs	Arvils Ašeradens	Jānis Reirs
5	Russian Union	Andrejs Mamikins	Andris Tolmačovs	Jevgēņija Krjukova	Elita Kosaka	Ludmila Ušakova
6	Latvian Association of Regions	Ieva Brante	Edvards Smiltēns	Juris Viļums	Nellija Kleinberga	Inga Bite
7	Progressives	Antoņina Ņenaševa	Inga Liepa-Meiere	Agnese Logina	Dace Kavasa	Līga Rasnača
8	Development/For!	Daniels Pavļuts	Artis Pabriks	Mārtiņš Bondars	Juris Pūce	Ilze Viņķele
9	New Conservatives	Juta Strīķe	Jānis Bordāns	Ilga Šuplinska	Juris Jurašs	Krišjānis Feldmanis
10	KPV LV	Artuss Kaimiņš	Linda Liepiņa	Roberts Spručs	Atis Zakatistovs	Kaspars Ģirģens
11	Latvian Nationalists	Andris Rubins	Alfrēds Buls	Vladislavs Bautris	Silvestrs Rubins	Kārlis Krūmiņš
12	For Latvia from the Heart	Inguna Sudraba	Gints Gābers	Jānis Valtervitenheims	Juris Jaunzems	Iveta Čivčiša
13	Action Party	Igors Meļņikovs	Jurijs Vasiļjevs	Tamāra Meļņikova	Andris Perjans	Jeļena Pičoha
14	For Alternative	Einārs Graudiņš	Juris Žuravļovs	Jānis Kuzins	Igors Glazunovs	Artūrs Malta
15	Latvian Centrist Party	Andžejs Ždanovičs	Vazgens Sorokins	Georgijs Sokolovskis	Dainis Grabovskis	Edvīns Puķe
16	SKG Alliance (LSDSP/KDS/GKL)	Armands Agrums	Jānis Dinevičs	Daiga Ceipiniece	Arvīds Kinstlers	Valdis Šakars

== Other parties ==
- United for Latvia – on 17 May 2018 party leader Inese Muhamberga announced that the party will not run in the elections.
- Latvian Socialist Party – has not submitted a separate electoral list, instead urging "Latvian workers" to "vote politically bankrupt politicians out of office". Its alliance with Harmony was dissolved in 2014, although some of its members or supporters have continued to run as candidates from Harmony.

== Opinion polls ==
Polling firm	Commissioner	Fieldwork date	Sample Size	SDPS	JV	ZZS	NA	LRA	NSL	LKS	VL	LA	JKP	GKL	KPV LV	Par!	PRO	Won't vote	Don't know	Other	Lead
FACTUM		24 – 30 September 2018	2,500	21	9	11	12	3		1	(n/a)	(Par)	15	(SKG)	12	13	3			1	6
Norstat		September 2018		12.7	6.1	10.7	6	1.4	1.3	0.8	(n/a)	(Par)	7.7	(SKG)	8.4	2.6	2.1	6.9	32.4	7.8	2
SKDS	Latvijas Televīzija	September 2018	about 1,000	17.2	3.8	9.4	6.9	2.2	1.5	1.7	(n/a)	(Par)	5.2	(SKG)	6.2	5	1.2	12.7	25.5	1.6	7.8
FACTUM		17 – 23 September 2018	2,381	19	9	12	12	3		2	(n/a)	(Par)	16	(SKG)	11	11	2			2	3
FACTUM		10 – 16 September 2018	1,164	21	10	10	13	3		3	(n/a)	(Par)	14	(SKG)	11	12	2			3	7
Kantar TNS	Delfi	8 – 12 September 2018	1,200	14.9	3.2	9.8	4.3	0.4	0.3	0.4	(n/a)	(Par)	5.3	(SKG)	9.3	4.0	0.8	5	38	5.1	5.1
FACTUM		3 – 9 September 2018	1,293	21	9	9	14	4		3	(n/a)	(Par)	15	(SKG)	13	9	2			3	6
Norstat	LNT	10 – 14 September 2018	501	13.9	3.3	9	5.4	1.4		1.9	(n/a)	(Par)	6.1	(SKG)	7.9	4.7	1	7	36.2	6.2	4.9
FACTUM		30 August – 5 September 2018	1,947	22	8	9	13	4		2	(n/a)	(Par)	15	(SKG)	13	10	3			4	7
Norstat	TV3 Latvija	September 2018		14.9	3.3	9	5.7			1.8	(n/a)	(Par)	6.9	(SKG)	6.6	4.5		5.4	37.6	4.3	5.9
FACTUM		27 August – 2 September 2018	1,915	24	7	9	12	3		2	(n/a)	(Par)	15	(SKG)	12	11	3			5	9
SKDS	Latvijas Televīzija	August 2018	900	33	7.9	17.8	9.4	4.5	2.7	1.9	(n/a)	(Par)	4.4	(SKG)	11.6	4.8	1.4			0.8	15.2
SKDS	Web	August 2018	900	24.7	5.8	9.2	10.5	4	2.6	5.2	(n/a)	(Par)	7.3	(SKG)	17.7	8.4	3.1			0.1	7
FACTUM		25–31 August 2018	1,750	23	7	10	12	3		3	(n/a)	(Par)	15	(SKG)	13	12	3			4	8
FACTUM		22–28 August 2018	1,337	22	7	11	12	2		3	(n/a)	(Par)	13	(SKG)	15	11	3			4	7
FACTUM		20–26 August 2018	1,340	21	7	12	12	2		2	(n/a)	(Par)	12	(SKG)	17	11	3			6	4
FACTUM		13–19 August 2018	1,433	21	6	12	12	4	1	4	(n/a)	(Par)	10	(SKG)	16	10	3			4	5
SKDS	Latvijas Televīzija	August 2018	~900	21.5	5.1	11.5	6.1	2.9	1.8	1.2	(n/a)	(Par)	2.9	(SKG)	7.5	3.1	1.4	12.0	23.0	0.1	10
FACTUM		1–6 August 2018		19	5	11	13	2	1	4	(n/a)	(Par)	10	(SKG)	16	14	2			5	3
FACTUM		26 July – 1 August 2018		19	5	12	12	2	1	2	(n/a)	(Par)	12	(SKG)	18	12	2			5	1
FACTUM		17–23 July 2018	1,494	19	5	12	14	4	1	2	(n/a)	(Par)	10	(SKG)	14	11	3			3	5
SKDS	Latvijas Televīzija	July 2018	1,000	21.4	2.9	12.4	6.8	1.1	1.9	0.7	(n/a)	(Par)	3.9	(SKG)	7	4.4	0.5				9
SKDS	Latvijas Televīzija	June 2018	1,000	21.0	2.7	14.4	6.1	1.7	1.5	1.2	(n/a)	(Par)	4.0	(SKG)	4.4	4.7	1.1	13.2	23.7	0.0	6.6
SKDS	Latvijas Televīzija	May 2018	1,000	19.1	3.7	14.6	7	1.7	1.6	1.3	(n/a)	(Par)	2.4	(SKG)	3	3	0.6	13.7	27.5	0.4	4.5
Norstat	TV3 Latvija	May 2018	1,000	16.3	6.2	17.1	9.1	3.2	2.1		(n/a)	1.8	6.1	(SKG)	3.5	3.6		1.8	26.7	2.6	0.8
SKDS	Latvijas Televīzija	April 2018	1,000	23.2	4.9	12.8	8.3	2.8			2.1		3.7	(SKG)	2.4	1.7		12.2	24.7	0.4	10.4
SKDS	Latvijas Televīzija	March 2018	1,000	20.4	4.9	13.9	6.3	1.6	0.9	1.0	0.3	0.7	3.6		1.9	1.2	0.3	12.9	30.0	0.4	6.5
SKDS	Latvijas Televīzija	February 2018	1,000	21.2	4.6	14.5	7.8	2.1					4.1		1.9			13.1	25	20.2	6.7
SKDS	Latvijas Televīzija	January 2018	1,000	20.4	2.9	15.3	5.8	2.5	1.0				4.1		2.0	1.4		16,5	26	2.1	5.2
SKDS	Latvijas Televīzija	December 2017		20.7	3.5	14.3	7.3	3.6	1.8	0.3	0.8	0.9	3.0		1.5	1.5	0.2	15.3	25	0.5	6.4
SKDS	Latvijas Televīzija	November 2017		19.8	3.8	15.3	7.0	2.4	2.1				3.9		1.6	1.2		14	26	2.9	4.5
SKDS	Latvijas Televīzija	October 2017		22.5	3.5	13.1	9.5	3.4	2.2				3.9		1.2	1.2		13.8	23.5	2.2	9.4
SKDS		September 2017		20.2	4.4	11.7	7.6	2.3	1.4				4.1		2.0	1.9		13.7	29.4	1.2	8.5
SKDS	Latvijas Televīzija	August 2017		20.9	3.1	13.1	6.8	4.3	1.6				5.5		0.8			15.9	26.1	1.9	7.8
SKDS		July 2017		21.2	3.7	13.8	5.8	4.5	2.0				4.2		1.4			17.0	24.1	2.4	7.4
SKDS		June 2017		22.3	4.0	14.5	5.4	3.0	3.4				2.9		3.5			12.4	26.9	1.7	7.8
SKDS		April 2017		23.0	4.1	14.6	6.4	5.1	2.2				2.0		3.8			12.4	24.1	2.3	8.4
SKDS		March 2017		21.2	4.2	13.1	7.9	3.9	1.9				2.9		4.0			14.3	24.0	2.6	8.1
SKDS		January 2017		21.0	4.2	10.5	6.9	3.8	1.9						6.2			15.0	26.0	4.5	10.5
SKDS	Latvijas Televīzija	December 2016		17.8	4.5	12.5	7.4	4.2	2.4						6.5			15.1	27.1	2.5	5.3
Latvijas Fakti		September 2016		17.9	5.0	17.3	7.3	2.5	2.8	0.7	0.3	0.6	0.7	0.0	3.4			13.0	28.6	0.0	0.6
		August 2016		18.7	5.2	18.7	7.5	2.2	2.3	0.8	0.3	0.5	0.4	0.1	3.6			11.6	28.1	0.0	Tie
		July 2016		18.6	6.1	18.2	7.1	2.1	2.1	1.3	0.4	0.4	0.3	0.2	4.3			9.4	29.3	0.0	0.4
SKDS		July 2016		17.8	6.3	17.5	9.1	2.1	1.9						5.9			16.8	19.6	3.0	0.3
SKDS	Latvijas Televīzija	June 2016		19.2	5.4	17.1	7.8	2.3	3.1						8.4			11.3	22.7	2.7	2.1
Latvijas Fakti		May 2016		19.1	4.1	19.9	6.2	2.4	1.4	1.3	0.7	0.4	0.2	0.3	6.1			12.4	25.6	0.0	0.8
Latvijas Fakti		April 2016		16.7	3.7	20.0	8.1	4.0	2.2	0.7	0.7	1.0	0.9	0.1				11.9	29.8	0.0	3.3
Latvijas Fakti		March 2016		17.9	5.5	20.2	9.0	4.6	2.3	0.7	0.6	1.3	0.6	0.4				14.7	22.4	0.0	2.3
Latvijas Fakti		February 2016		18.5	5.4	18.1	8.3	3.9	2.8	1.3	0.5	0.1	0.6					17.5	22.1	1.0	0.4
Latvijas Fakti		February 2016		20.1	5.9	21.2	8.7	4.6	2.2	0.7	0.4	1.0	0.5					11.9	23.9	0.0	1.1
Latvijas Fakti		January 2016		18.7	5.3	16.8	8.1	4.7	1.6	0.4	0.3	0.7	0.2					12.6	30.7	0.0	1.9
Latvijas Fakti		December 2015		19.5	5.5	15.6	8.7	5.0	1.9	0.4	0.5	0.3	0.3					11.5	31.0	0.0	3.9
Latvijas Fakti		November 2015		18.1	8.1	14.9	8.2	5.6	3.6	0.5	0.5	0.5	0.6					12.6	26.8	0.0	3.2
Latvijas Fakti		October 2015		20.5	7.2	15.1	7.9	4.4	2.0	0.3	0.7	0.3	0.1					13.0	28.4	0.0	5.4
Latvijas Fakti		August 2015		21.7	8.0	13.6	10.0	4.4	2.8									12.7	25.1	1.7	8.1
Latvijas Fakti		April 2015		20.5	10.3	13.3	9.0	4.8	3.9	1.0		0.2						11.5	24.5	1.0	7.2
Latvijas Fakti		February 2015		18.4	9.8	12.7	7.7	3.6	3.4									15.3	26.5	2.6	5.7
2014 election		October 2014		23.0	21.9	19.7	16.6	6.7	6.9	1.6	1.2	0.9	-	-	-	-	-	-	-	0.4	1.1

=== Graphical summary ===
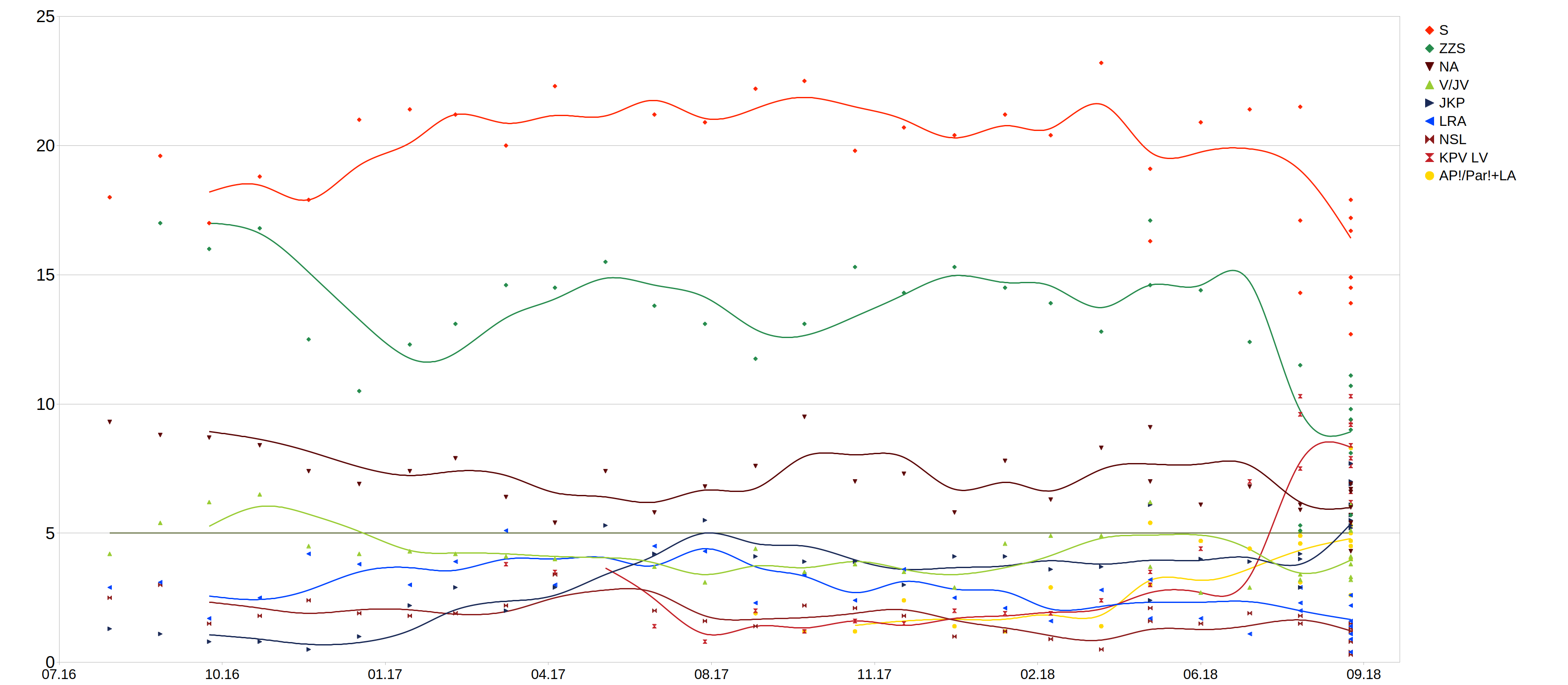
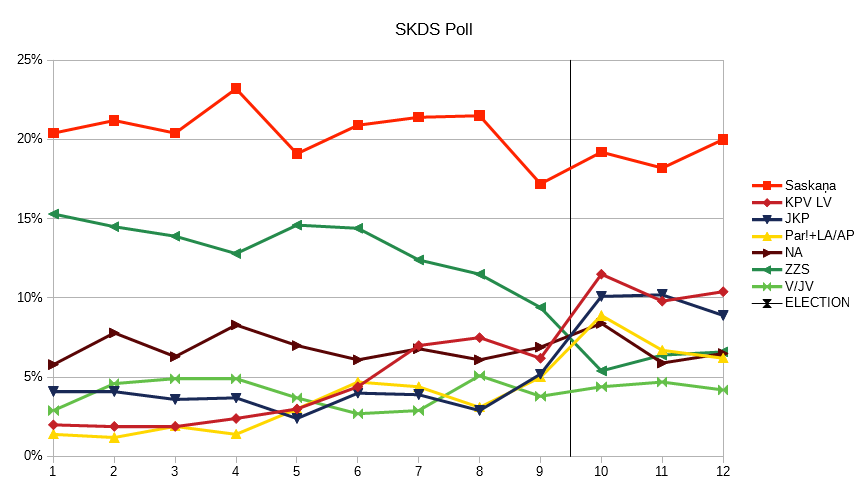

== Results ==
Winning party and their result by municipalities

Party	Votes	%	Seats	+/–
Social Democratic Party "Harmony"	167,117	19.92	23	–1
Who Owns the State?	120,264	14.33	16	New
New Conservative Party	114,694	13.67	16	+16
Development/For!	101,685	12.12	13	+13
National Alliance	92,963	11.08	13	–4
Union of Greens and Farmers	83,675	9.97	11	–10
New Unity	56,542	6.74	8	–15
Latvian Association of Regions	35,018	4.17	0	–8
Latvian Russian Union	27,014	3.22	0	0
The Progressives	22,078	2.63	0	New
For Latvia from the Heart	7,114	0.85	0	–7
Latvian Nationalists	4,245	0.51	0	New
For an Alternative	2,900	0.35	0	New
SKG Alliance	1,735	0.21	0	New
Action Party	1,059	0.13	0	New
Latvian Centrist Party	897	0.11	0	New
Total	839,000	100.00	100	0
Valid votes	839,000	99.30		
Invalid/blank votes	5,925	0.70		
Total votes	844,925	100.00		
Registered voters/turnout	1,548,100	54.58		
Source: CVK

== Aftermath ==
Political leaders met on 18 October with the president Raimonds Vējonis. Although they failed to agree on a name for a prime minister, they reiterated their intention to form a coalition government and to exclude Harmony from any coalition, even if it required forming a coalition of five or six parties.

On 7 November 2018, Latvian President Raimonds Vējonis asked Bordāns to form a new coalition government and serve as the next Prime Minister of Latvia. Bordāns intended to form a five-party majority coalition, and he announced that his coalition will not include ZZS, a political alliance led by a Latvian oligarch Aivars Lembergs. However, other political parties wished to cooperate also with ZZS. Consequently, Bordāns did not reach an agreement with the coalition partners, and informed the President that he is unable to form the cabinet.

On 14 November 2018, Development/For!, National Alliance and New Unity pulled out of coalition talks with the New Conservative Party and KPV LV, making a five-way centre-right coalition government infeasible.

After Jānis Bordāns was unsuccessful in negotiating a governing coalition, President Raimonds Vējonis nominated Gobzems as Prime Minister of Latvia on 26 November 2018 and gave him two weeks to form a government. A week later, he proposed a coalition that would consist of his Who Owns the State? party along with the New Conservative Party, the National Alliance, the Union of Greens and Farmers, and New Unity, despite the conservatives' objection to the Greens and Farmers' inclusion in government. Fellow Who Owns the State? party leader Artuss Kaimiņš also opposed the inclusion of the Greens and Farmers, leading to a breakdown in talks later in the week. Gobzems then retracted his proposal for the coalition and instead called for a non-partisan cabinet of unnamed "best of the best" industry professionals, a proposal that was nearly immediately rejected by the conservatives, the nationalists, and New Unity on the grounds that it could increase the influence of the Harmony party. Although he had initially called on the president to hold early elections if his proposal were to be rejected, Gobzems instead offered a new four-party coalition that would not include the Union of Greens and Farmers. The president revoked Gobzems' nomination on 10 December 2018.

In December it was announced that coalition talks would continue into January.

On 7 January 2019, Arturs Krišjānis Kariņš was tasked by Latvian President Raimonds Vējonis with forming the next government, following the failures of previous nominees Bordans and Gobzems in a contentious negotiation process. Kariņš took office as prime minister on 23 January 2019, leading a broad centre-right coalition of five conservative and liberal parties that includes KPV LV, New Conservative Party, Development/For!, National Alliance and New Unity.
