= Leons =

Leons can refer to:

- Leons, Friesland, village in Leeuwarden municipality, Friesland province, the Netherlands
- Leons (name), masculine given name and surname
- Saint-Léons, commune in the Aveyron department, France

== See also ==
- Leon's, Canadian furniture retailer
