= Leons (name) =

Leons can be both a masculine given name and a surname. Notable people with the name include:

== Given name ==
- Leons Briedis, Latvian poet
- Leons Līdums, Latvian politician

== Surname ==
- Harry Leons (born 1974), American football player
- Malevy Leons (born 1999), Dutch basketball player
