= Ivars Ijabs =

Latvian politician, musician

Ivars Ijabs MEP
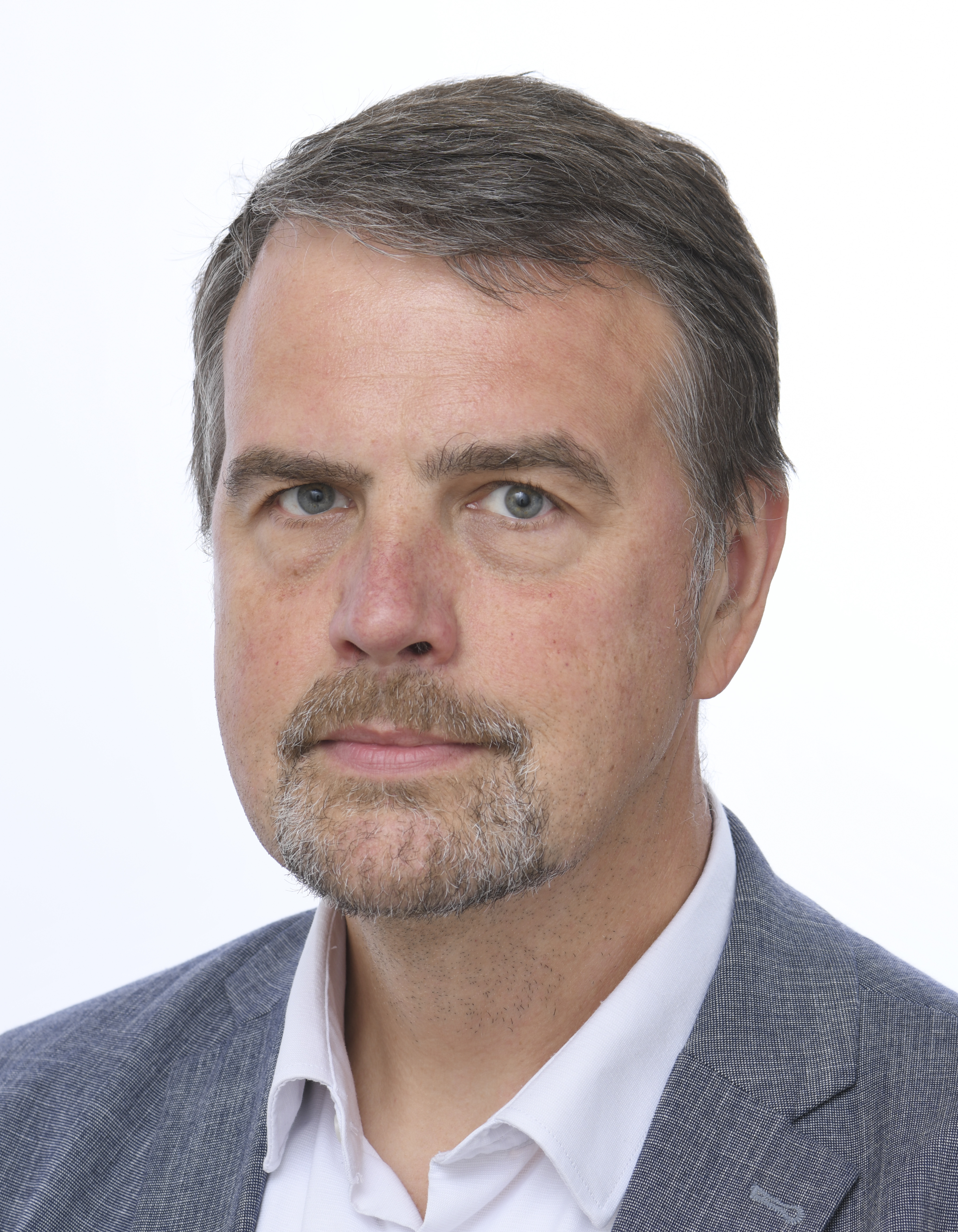
- Ijabs in 2024

Member of the European Parliament
- Incumbent
- Assumed office 2 July 2019

Personal details
- Born: 17 November 1972 (age 53) Riga, Latvia
- Party: For Latvia's Development (2019–)
- Other political affiliations: Development/For! (2019–); Renew Europe (2019–)
- Spouse: Terēze Zīberte-Ijaba (m. 2004)
- Education: University of Latvia

Ivars Ijabs (born 17 November 1972) is a Latvian political scientist and politician. He is a lecturer and professor at the University of Latvia and holds a PhD in political science. In May 2019, representing political alliance Development/For!, he was elected as a Member of the European Parliament. He then joined Renew Europe Group.

== Early life and career ==
Ijabs was born in Riga, where he also spent most of his childhood and teenage years. In 1996 he graduated from the Jāzeps Vītols Latvian Academy of Music and obtained his first bachelor's degree in arts. He played French horn in the Rīga orchestra and the Liepāja Symphony Orchestra. In 1997 he enrolled in the Faculty of History and Philosophy at the University of Latvia where he in 2001 obtained his bachelor's and in 2003 his master's degrees in philosophy. Since then he has been teaching at the university. In 2007 Ijabs obtained a doctoral degree from the Faculty of Social Sciences at the University of Latvia and became an associate professor at the university. His dissertation topic was ‘Civil society discourse in modern political theory and its elements in the history of Latvian political ideas’ (Pilsoniskās sabiedrības diskurss modernajā politikas teorijā un tā elementi Latvijas politisko ideju vēsturē).

During his studies, Ijabs also spent time studying abroad. He was a philosophy and political science student at Reykjavík University, the University of Greifswald, University of Bremen, Humboldt University of Berlin and a Fulbright fellow at Rutgers University. In addition, his academic experience is backed with a series of intensive courses in the fields of legislation, governance and integration.

He is an author of several research articles and books. He has been a leading researcher in multiple scientific projects.

== Member of the European Parliament ==
Ijabs is a full member of the Committee on Industry, Research and Energy and the Delegation for relations with the United States. He is a substitute member of the Committee on the Internal Market and Consumer Protection, the Committee on Economic and Monetary Affairs, the Delegation for relations with the countries of the Andean Community, the Delegation for relations with the countries of Southeast Asia and the Association of Southeast Asian Nations (ASEAN), and the Delegation to the Euro-Latin American Parliamentary Assembly. In 2020, he also joined the Special Committee on Beating Cancer.

In addition to his committee assignments, Ijabs is part of the parliament's delegations for relations with the countries of the Andean Community, with the countries of Southeast Asia and the Association of Southeast Asian Nations (ASEAN) and to the Euro-Latin American Parliamentary Assembly. He is a member of the Panel for the Future of Science and Technology of the European Parliament (formally Science and Technology Options Assessment), the European Parliament Intergroup on Artificial Intelligence and the European Parliament Intergroup on LGBT Rights.

Since Juris Pūce's resignation as chairman of For Latvia's Development and co-chair of the Development/For! alliance in November 2020, Ijabs has been serving as acting chairman of For Latvia's Development, as well as acting co-chair of Development/For!.

In June 2024, he was re-elected as a member of the European Parliament from the "For Latvia's Development" party, which won 9.36% of the vote.

== Other activities ==
From 2014 to 2019 Ijabs was chairman of the Board of the Foundation for an Open Society DOTS. From 2009 to 2013 he was chairman of the Board of the Latvian Association of Political Scientists. Since 2018 he is a Corresponding member of the Latvian Academy of Science.

== Personal life ==
Ijabs is married to violinist Terēze Zīberte-Ijaba. The couple has three children.
