= Gatis Eglītis =

Latvian politician

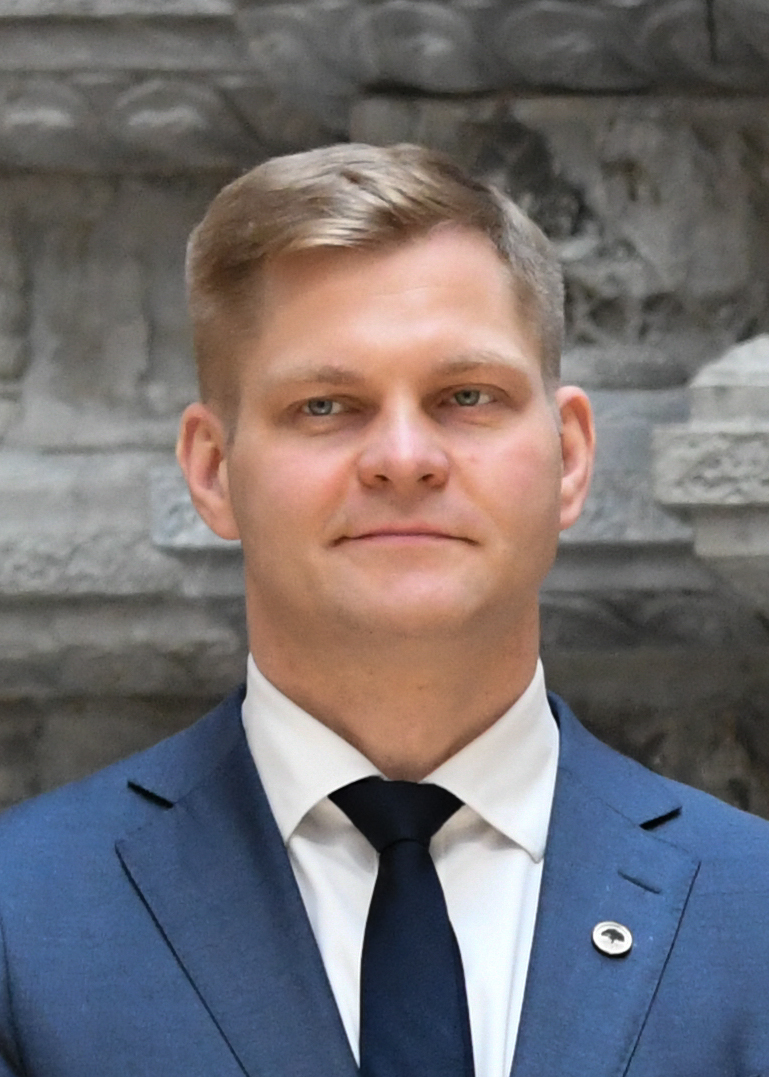

Minister of Welfare
- In office 3 June 2021 – 14 December 2022
- President: Egils Levits
- Prime Minister: Arturs Krišjānis Kariņš
- Preceded by: Ramona Petraviča
- Succeeded by: Evika Siliņa

Personal details
- Born: 4 December 1978 (age 47) Dobele, Latvian SSR (now Latvia)
- Party: The Conservatives

Gatis Eglītis (born 4 December 1978) is a Latvian politician, who served as Minister of Welfare in the Kariņš cabinet. A member of the New Conservative Party, he served as a member of the Parliament of Latvia between 6 November 2018 and 8 June 2021. Since 2023, he is the leader of the party.
