= Evika Siliņa =

Prime Minister of Latvia from 2023 to 2026

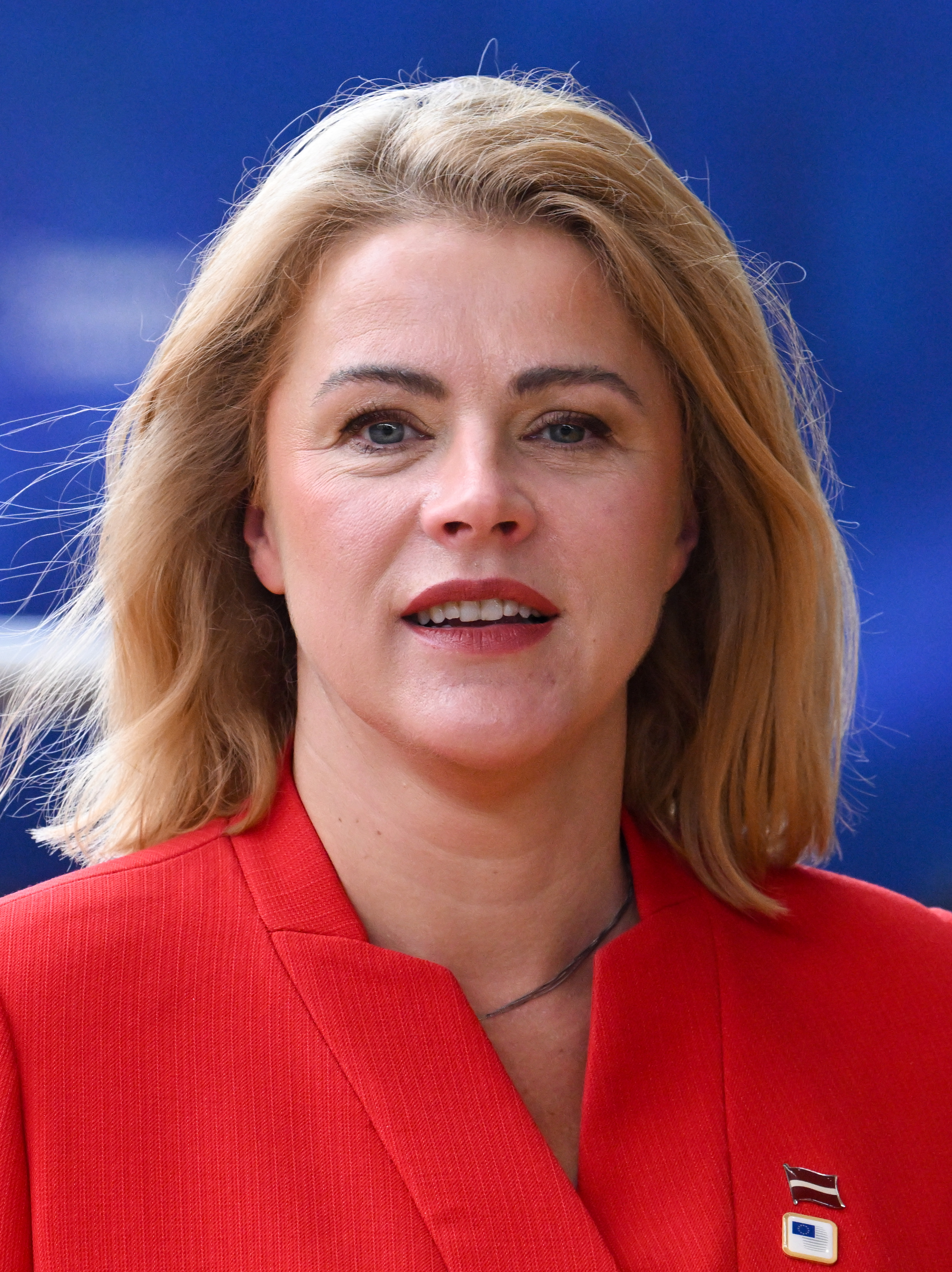
- Siliņa in 2024

24th Prime Minister of Latvia
- In office 15 September 2023 – 28 May 2026
- President: Edgars Rinkēvičs
- Preceded by: Krišjānis Kariņš
- Succeeded by: Andris Kulbergs

Minister of Welfare
- In office 14 December 2022 – 15 September 2023
- Prime Minister: Krišjānis Kariņš
- Preceded by: Gatis Eglītis
- Succeeded by: Uldis Augulis

Member of the Saeima
- Incumbent
- Assumed office 11 June 2026
- In office 1 November 2022 – 14 December 2022

Personal details
- Born: 3 August 1975 (age 51) Riga, Latvian Soviet Socialist Republic
- Party: Unity (2022–present)
- Other political affiliations: Reform (2011–2015)
- Spouse: Aigars Siliņš
- Children: 3
- Education: University of Latvia; Riga Graduate School of Law

Evika Siliņa ([ˈævika ˈsiliɲa]; born 3 August 1975) is a Latvian politician who served as prime minister of Latvia from 2023 to 2026. From 2022 to 2023, she served as Minister of Welfare in the second cabinet of prime minister Krišjānis Kariņš. She is a member of the Unity political party, a member of the New Unity alliance, and the second female head of government of Latvia. She serves as the Member of Saeima since 11 June 2026.

Following the collapse of her government coalition, she resigned on 14 May 2026 and remained in office as caretaker prime minister until her successor, Andris Kulbergs, was appointed two weeks later.

== Early life ==
Siliņa was born in Riga on 3 August 1975. She studied at the University of Latvia from 1993 to 1997, where she obtained a bachelor's degree in law and at the Riga Graduate School of Law for a master's degree in social sciences, international law, and European law.

From 2003 to 2012, Siliņa worked as a lawyer specializing in international and domestic business law. Her clients included firms in telecommunications and IT as well as government bodies.

== Political career ==
In the 2011 Latvian parliamentary election, Siliņa ran as a candidate of the Zatlers' Reform Party in Riga, but was not elected. From 2011 to 2012, she was a legal adviser to the Minister of Interior.

Siliņa served as the Parliamentary Secretary at the Ministry of Interior from January 2013 until 23 January 2019. During her tenure as the Ministry of Interior's Secretary, Silina was praised for her openness to journalists, as well as for her fight against synthetic cannabinoids and their circulation in Latvia. She also represented the Ministry in international organizations such as the United Nations, INTERPOL, and CEPOL.

Following the approval of the Cabinet of Ministers led by Prime Minister Krišjānis Kariņš on 23 January 2019, she assumed the role of Parliamentary Secretary to the Prime Minister.

Siliņa ran as a New Unity party alliance candidate in the 2022 Latvian parliamentary election and was elected to the 14th Saeima.

On 6 December 2022, Siliņa was appointed as the Minister of Welfare in the Krišjānis Kariņš' cabinet. The new cabinet was confirmed on 14 December.

As the Minister of Welfare, increasing minimum income was one of her main objectives. On 23 February 2023, she was appointed by the Prime Minister as a member of the newly formed Thematic Committee on European Union Funds. On 4 July 2023, her Ministry brought to the Saeima ratification of the Istanbul Convention with some reservations and the non-support of the government partner National Alliance.

On 11 June 2026, following the end of her term as Prime Minister, Siliņa's parliamentary mandate in the 14th Saeima was restored. On 17 June 2026, Siliņa was elected Chair of the Saeima's European Affairs Committee.

Siliņa ran as a New Unity candidate in the 2026 Latvian parliamentary election in the Vidzeme constituency and was elected to the 15th Saeima.

=== Prime Minister of Latvia (2023–2026) ===
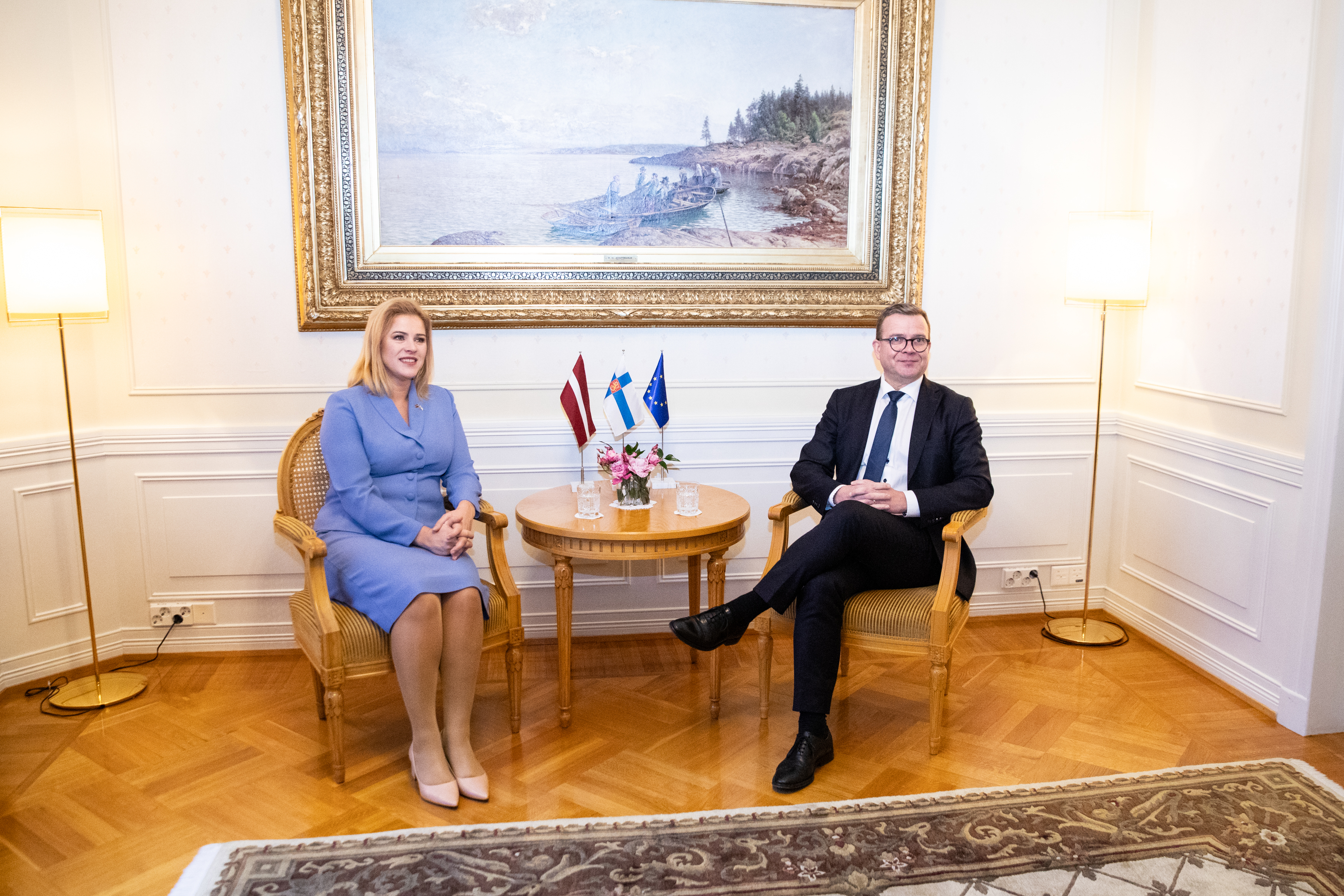
Siliņa with Finnish Prime Minister Petteri Orpo in Helsinki, 24 November 2023

On 16 August 2023, after the resignation of Krišjānis Kariņš, the New Unity nominated Siliņa as a candidate for the post of prime minister. On 24 August, she was asked by President Edgars Rinkēvičs to form a government.

On 29 August, United List declined to be part of a four-party coalition government following the offer by Siliņa. On 1 September, Siliņa indicated that she intended to forge a new parliamentary majority with the Union of Greens and Farmers (ZZS) and The Progressives (P). Twelve days later she unveiled the composition of the new government, in which New Unity (JV) had seven ministries, ZZS four and P three, with Krišjānis Kariņš recalled as Minister of Foreign Affairs.

The government coalition led by Siliņa won the confidence of the parliamentary majority in the Saeima on 15 September 2023, receiving 53 votes. In her speech, the new Prime Minister emphasized the need to be more inclusive, which was interpreted as prioritizing gender equality and other progressive goals. For the Russian-speaking minority, inclusion assumes elimination of the "non-citizen" status and integration into the Latvian-based education system. The government also aims to increase the military budget and complete the construction of the barrier on the country's border with Russia and Belarus. Siliņa is the second woman to become prime minister of Latvia, following Laimdota Straujuma in 2014–2016.

On 14 May 2026, Siliņa announced her resignation as Prime Minister after the Progressives withdrew support from her government. They did so after Siliņa fired Defence Minister Andris Spruds following the explosion of two drones in eastern Latvia during the Russo-Ukrainian war.

== Awards and honours ==
- On 12 September 2024, Siliņa was awarded the Order of Princess Olga, 1st Class, by Ukrainian President Volodymyr Zelenskyy during her official visit to Ukraine. The award was conferred in recognition of her contribution to strengthening interstate cooperation, supporting Ukraine's sovereignty and territorial integrity, and promoting Ukraine internationally.
- On 28 March 2025, Siliņa received the Henry A. Kissinger Prize jointly with former Prime Minister of Estonia Kaja Kallas and former Prime Minister of Lithuania Ingrida Šimonytė. The award recognised their contributions to transatlantic relations and their efforts in support of democratic values, national sovereignty, the rule of law, Ukraine, and European security and cooperation. It was the first occasion on which the prize was conferred jointly upon three recipients.

== Personal life ==
Evika Siliņa is married to Aigars Siliņš, with whom she has three children.

As well as her native language of Latvian, Siliņa is fluent in Russian and English.

== See also ==
- List of current heads of state and government
- List of heads of the executive by approval rating
- List of political parties in Latvia
- Category:New Unity politicians

== Notes ==
Political offices
Preceded by Gatis Eglītis	Minister of Welfare; 2022–2023	Succeeded by Uldis Augulis
Preceded by Krišjānis Kariņš	Prime Minister of Latvia; 2023–2026	Succeeded by Andris Kulbergs
