= Second Kariņš cabinet =

Government of Latvia (2022–2023)

- 41st Cabinet of Republic of Latvia

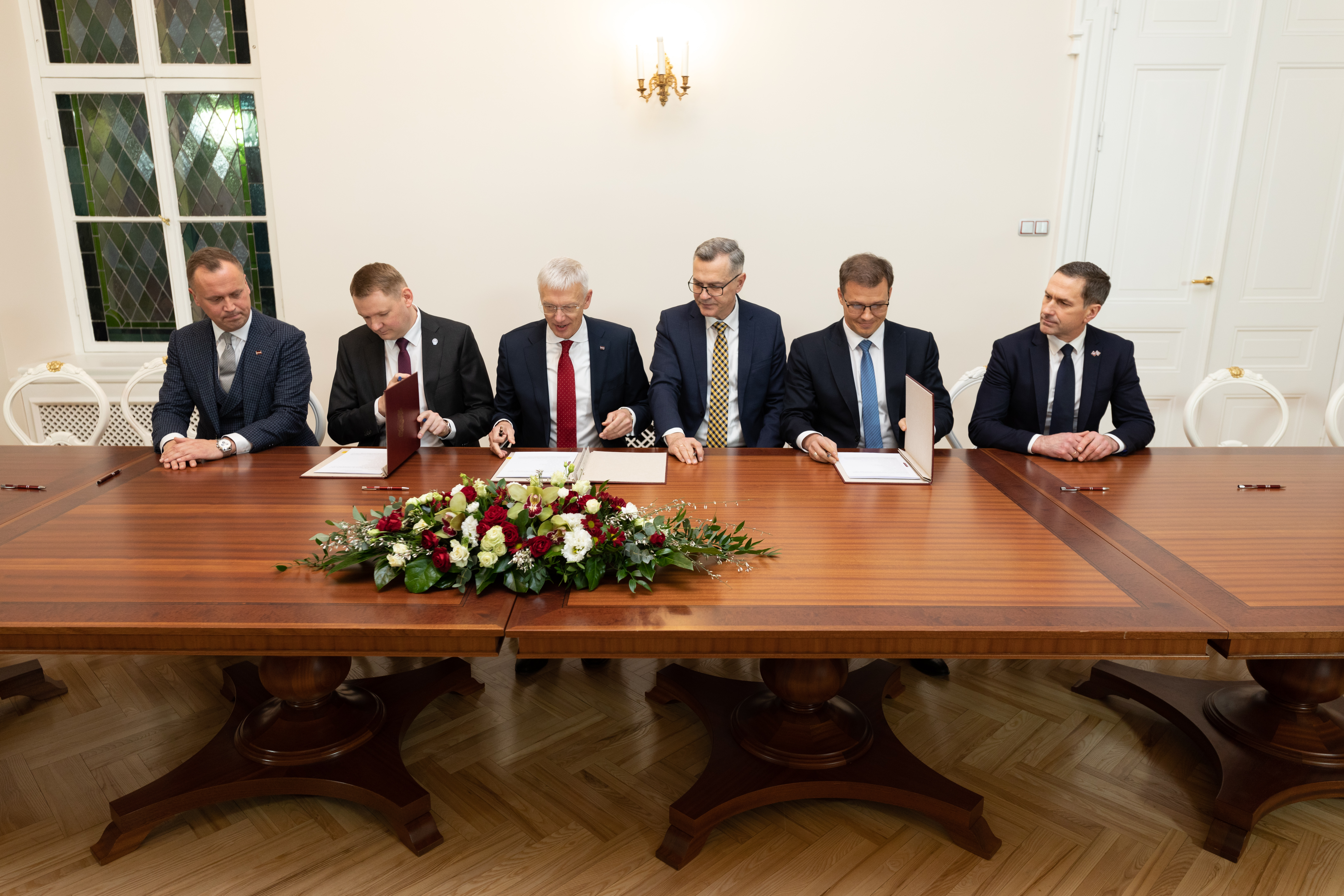
- Date formed: 14 December 2022
- Date dissolved: 15 September 2023

People and organisations
- Head of state: Egils Levits (2022–2023); Edgars Rinkēvičs (2023)
- Head of government: Krišjānis Kariņš
- Member party: New Unity; National Alliance; United List
- Status in legislature: Majority coalition government
- Opposition party: Union of Greens and Farmers; For Stability! The Progressives; Latvia First
- Opposition leader: Viktors Valainis; Kaspars Briškens; Aleksejs Rosļikovs; Ainārs Šlesers

History
- Election: 2022 Latvian parliamentary election
- Legislature term: 14th Saeima
- Predecessor: First Kariņš' cabinet
- Successor: Siliņa cabinet

The second Krišjānis Kariņš' cabinet (Latvian: Kariņa 2. ministru kabinets) was the 41st government of Latvia, sworn in on 14 December 2022 after Krišjānis Kariņš was proposed as Prime Minister by President Egils Levits and elected by the Saeima. The government was formed after the 2022 Latvian parliamentary election which was won decisively by Kariņš and his pro-western allies.

The government is a coalition between New Unity, National Alliance, and United List.

On 14 August 2023, Kariņš announced his resignation from the post of Prime Minister. One reason stated was the refusal of the National Alliance to approve Kariņš' proposal to invite The Progressives and the Union of Greens and Farmers to the coalition.

== Party breakdown ==
New Unity	7
National Alliance	4
United List	4

== Composition ==
Nr.	Office	Image	Incumbent	Party	In Office
	Prime Minister of Latvia Prime Minister of Latvia		Krišjānis Kariņš	New Unity	14 December 2022 – 15 September 2023
1.	Minister for Defence of Latvia Minister for Defence		Ināra Mūrniece	National Alliance	14 December 2022 – 15 September 2023
2.	Minister for Foreign Affairs		Edgars Rinkēvičs	New Unity	14 December 2022 – 8 July 2023
2.	Minister for Foreign Affairs		Krišjānis Kariņš (acting)	New Unity	8 July 2023 – 15 September 2023
3.	Minister for Economics		Ilze Indriksone	National Alliance	14 December 2022 – 15 September 2023
4.	Minister for Finance		Arvils Ašeradens	New Unity	14 December 2022 – 15 September 2023
5.	Minister for the Interior		Māris Kučinskis	United List	14 December 2022 – 15 September 2023
6.	Minister for Education and Science		Anda Čakša	New Unity	14 December 2022 – 15 September 2023
7.	Minister for Climate and Energy		Raimonds Čudars	New Unity	14 December 2022 – 15 September 2023
8.	Minister for Culture		Nauris Puntulis	National Alliance	14 December 2022 – 15 September 2023
9.	Minister for Welfare		Evika Siliņa	New Unity	14 December 2022 – 15 September 2023
10.	Minister for Transport		Jānis Vitenbergs	National Alliance	14 December 2022 – 15 September 2023
11.	Minister for Justice		Inese Lībiņa-Egnere	New Unity	14 December 2022 – 15 September 2023
12.	Minister for Health		Līga Meņģelsone	United List	14 December 2022 – 15 September 2023
13.	Minister for Environmental Protection and Regional Development		Māris Sprindžuks	United List	14 December 2022 – 15 September 2023
14.	Minister for Agriculture		Didzis Šmits	United List	14 December 2022 – 15 September 2023
