= Leons Līdums =

Latvian politician (born 1957)

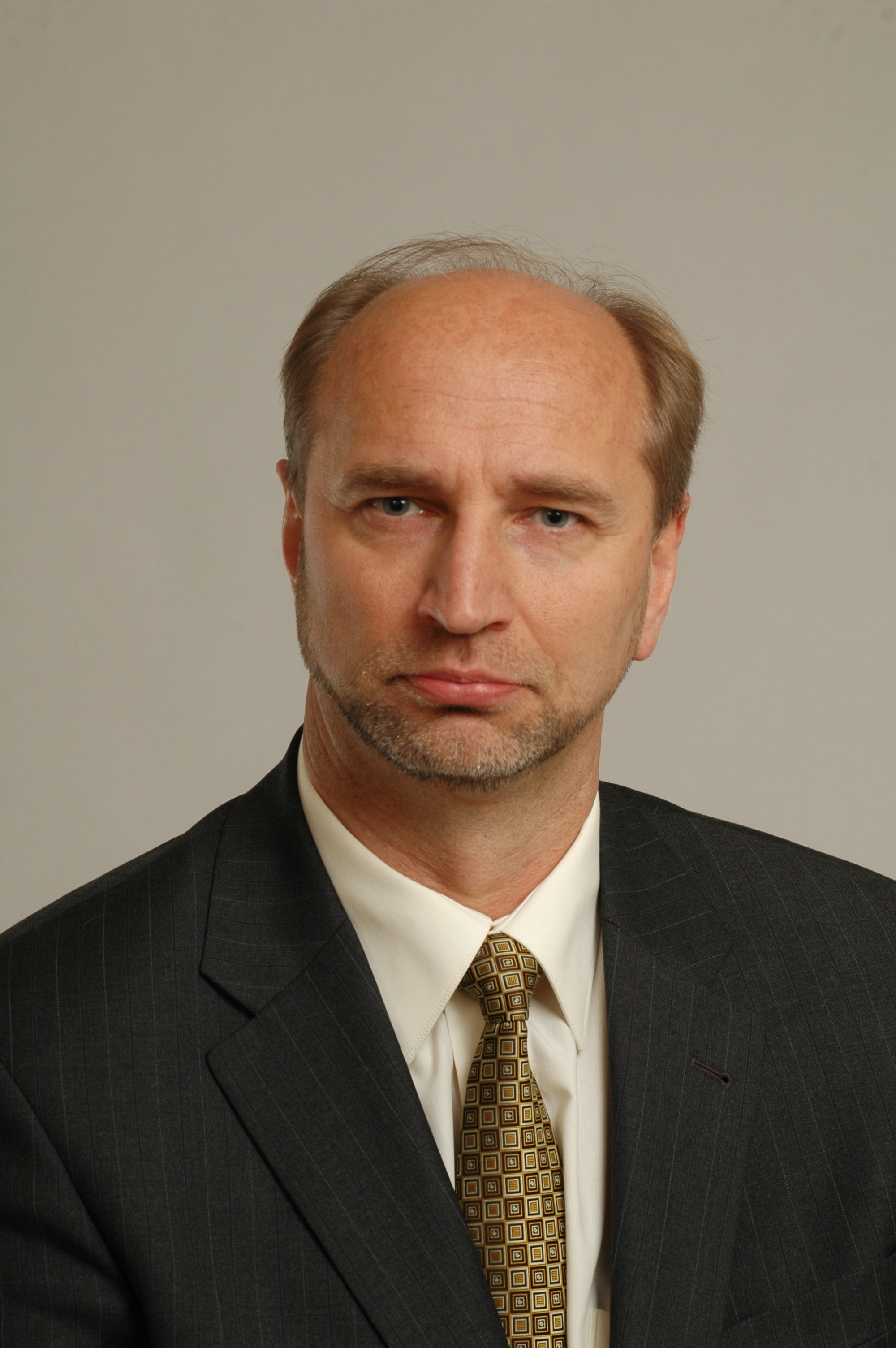

Leons Līdums (born 1957) is a Latvian politician. He was a Deputy of the 9th Saeima while being a member of the People's Party. After leaving the People's Party in 2009, he joined the regionalist Vidzeme Party (VP), and in 2021 switched to the For Latvia's Development (LA) party.

Since 29 December 2010, he is the Chair (Chairperson) of Aizkraukle Municipality Council, representing the joint LA/VP electoral list.
