= Izaugsme =

Political party in Latvia

Growth Izaugsme
- Leader: Andris Skride
- Founded: 27 March 2013; 13 years ago
- Headquarters: Meža iela 5 Baloži, Ķekava Municipality
- Ideology: Regionalism
- Political position: Centre
- National affiliation: United List; Development/For! (de iure only)
- Colours: Yellow; Green
- Saeima: 1 / 100
- European Parliament: 0 / 8
- Mayors: 1 / 43

Website
- partijaizaugsme.lv

Party chairman Andris Skride in the Saeima

Growth (Latvian: Izaugsme) is a centrist political party in Latvia. It was founded on March 27, 2013, by cardiologist Andris Skride. It is governed by a board of five members – Artūrs Ancāns, Artūrs Čačka, Andris Skride, Rita Turkina un Juris Žilko.

The party participated in the 2014 Latvian parliamentary elections, placing second-to-last.

In March 2018, Growth voted to form the Development/For! party alliance with the liberal For Latvia's Development and Movement For! parties to run in the 2018 Latvian parliamentary election. The alliance won 13 seats in the Saeima, with one seat won by party leader Skride. The alliance became the biggest party at the 2020 Riga City Council elections on a joint list with The Progressives, although none of the four Growth candidates running were elected. The alliance de facto dissolved in 2022.

== Party ideology ==
The party does not have a specific ideology, although it has been described as regionalist, with its program focusing on increasing public health and research spending, government efficiency and strengthening the judiciary. The program also expresses support for adopting a progressive tax model.

== Election results ==
=== Legislative elections ===
| Election | Party leader | Performance | | | | | Rank | Government |
| Election | Party leader | Votes | % | ± pp | Seats | +/– | Rank | Government |
|---|---|---|---|---|---|---|---|---|
| 2014 | Andris Skride | 1,515 | 0.17 | New | 0 / 100 | New | 12th | Extra-parliamentary |
| 2018 (Note: Run as part of the Development/For! coalition (Movement For!, LA and Izaugsme)) | Andris Skride | 101,685 | 12.12 | ▲11.95 | 1 / 100 | ▲1 | ▲4th | Coalition |
| 2022 | Andris Skride | 45,452 | 4.97 | ▼7.15 | 0 / 100 | ▼1 | ▼8th | Extra-parliamentary |
| 2026 (Note: AS list won 41 seats; 18 to LRA, 13 to LZP, 3 to LP, 1 to Izaugsme and 6 to independents) | Andris Skride | 283,892 | 35.76 | ▼24.62 | 1 / 100 | ▲1 | ▼12th | Extra-parliamentary |

The party currently also has elected members in the councils of Madona Municipality and Ķekava Municipality.
