= For Latvia's Development =

Political party in Latvia

For Latvia's Development Latvijas attīstībai
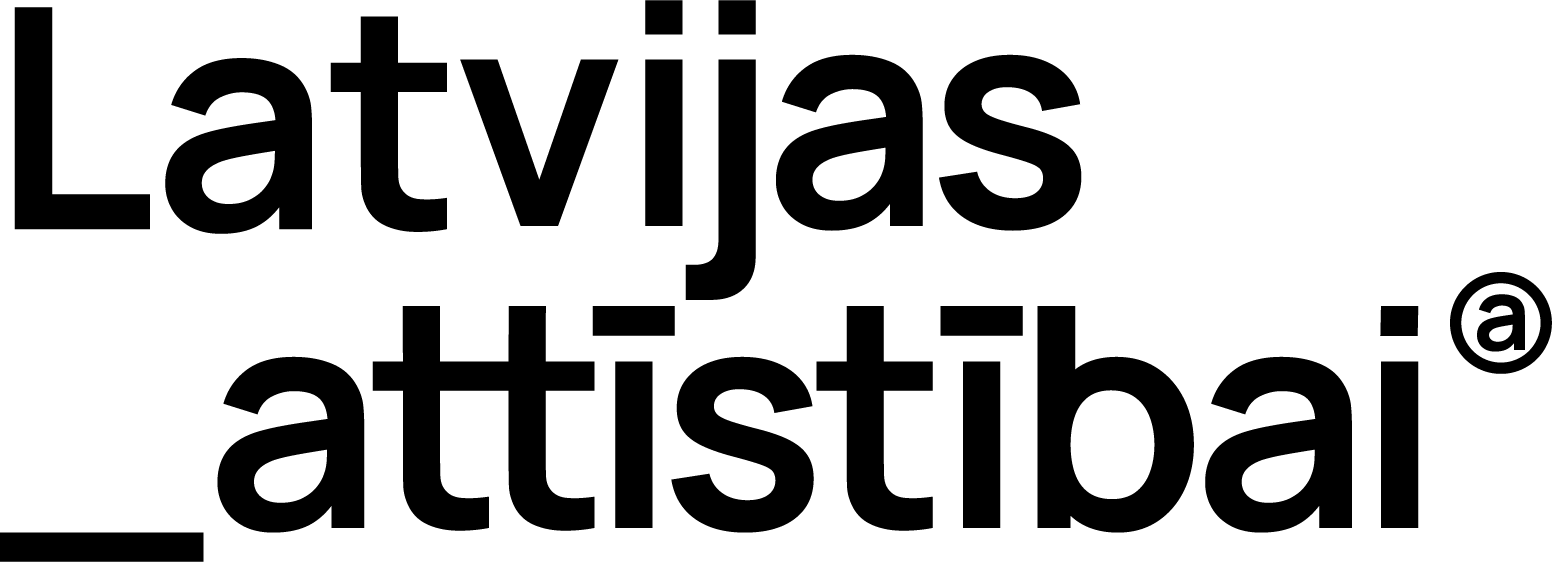
- Abbreviation: LA
- Co-chairs: Ivars Ijabs; Juris Pūce; Artis Pabriks
- Founder: Einars Repše
- Founded: 15 December 2013; 12 years ago
- Split from: Unity
- Headquarters: Blaumaņa iela 5a Riga
- Youth wing: Jaunieši attīstībai
- Ideology: Classical liberalism
- Political position: Centre-right
- European affiliation: Alliance of Liberals and Democrats for Europe Party
- European Parliament group: Renew Europe
- Colours: Grey; Yellow (customary) (Note: Former colors: Radical red (2013–2016) Red (2016–2019) Pink and yellow (2019–2021) Yellow and black (2021–2023))
- Saeima: 0 / 100 (0%)
- European Parliament: 1 / 9 (11%)
- Riga City Council: 4 / 60
- Mayors: 4 / 43

Website
- attistibai.lv

For Latvia's Development (Latvian: Latvijas attīstībai, abbr. LA) is a classical liberal political party in Latvia. It is positioned on the centre-right on the political spectrum. From 2018 to 2022 it was one of the members of the Development/For! alliance, before it de facto dissolved.

== History ==
The party was founded in 2013 by the former Prime Minister of Latvia Einars Repše.

Internationally the party is a full member of the Alliance of Liberals and Democrats for Europe Party, a grouping of centrist and liberal parties from across Europe, since April 2013.

On 29 November 2014 Juris Pūce was elected as the new chairperson and a new political manifesto was adopted.

With the adoption of the new manifesto, the party defined itself as a liberal party that "appreciates and values" individual freedom and equal treatment before the law regardless of nationality, race, sex, sexual orientation, religion, or physical and mental abilities. Later on the party defined itself as representing classical or market liberalism.

Ahead of the 2018 parliamentary election, LA formed an alliance with Movement For! and Growth, called "Development/For!". This alliance, led by Artis Pabriks, won 12% of the votes and 13 of 100 seats in the Saeima. It joined the Kariņš cabinet, taking three ministerial posts, including Juris Pūce as minister of environmental protection and regional development as well as Artis Pabriks as defence minister and deputy prime minister. Artis Pabriks and member of the European Parliament Ivars Ijabs, who had been members of the "Development/For!" alliance, but not For Latvia's Development, joined the party in October 2019.

In the snap 2020 Riga City Council election, Development/For! teamed up with The Progressives to form a common list, which received the most votes an led the ruling coalition. However, in late of 2022, The Progressives and Movement For! terminated their cooperation with LA and their 3 deputies switched to opposing Mayor Mārtiņš Staķis. Eventually, as Staķis was replaced by Vilnis Ķirsis in August 2023, The Progressives joined the opposition as well, but Movement For! remained in the new coalition.

After disappointing results from the 2022 parliamentary election, in which the alliance failed to return its parliamentary seats, the alliance was technically dissolved, though it remains registered to maintain state funding under the legal name of PLI (an abbreviation of the initials of the names of the former constituent parties).

== Election results ==
=== Legislative elections ===
Election	Party leader	Performance					Rank	Government
Election	Party leader	Votes	%	± pp	Seats	+/–	Rank	Government
2014	Einars Repše	8,156	0.90	New	0 / 100	New	9th	Extra-parliamentary
2018 (Note: Run as part of the Development/For! coalition (Movement For!, LA and Izaugsme))	Juris Pūce	101,685	12.12	▲11.22	6 / 100	▲6	▲4th	Coalition
2022	Artis Pabriks	45,452	4.97	▼7.15	0 / 100	▼6	▼8th	Extra-parliamentary
2026	Juris Pūce	17,533	2.21	▼2.76	0 / 100	0	▼9th	Extra-parliamentary

=== European Parliament elections ===
Election	List leader	Votes	%	Seats	+/–	EP Group
2014	Andrejs Žagars	9,421	2.14 (#8)	0 / 8	New	–
2019 (Note: The Development/For! list won 1 seat, that went to LA)	Ivars Ijabs	58,763	12.49 (#4)	1 / 8	▲1	RE
2024	Ivars Ijabs	48,696	9.46 (#3)	1 / 9	0	RE

=== Riga City Council ===
Election	Party leader	Performance					Rank	Government
Election	Party leader	Votes	%	± pp	Seats	+/–	Rank	Government
2017	Juris Pūce	34,176	13.66 (LRA-LA (Note: LRA-LA list won 9 seats – 1 to LRA – 5 to LA – 3 independent))	New	5 / 60	New	2nd	Opposition
2020	Anete Jēkabsone-Žogota	44,759	26.14 (AP!-PRO (Note: AP!-PRO list won 18 seats – 4 to LA – 3 to KP! – 11 to PRO))	▲12.48	4 / 60	▼1	▲1st	Coalition (2020–2022)
2020	Anete Jēkabsone-Žogota	44,759	26.14 (AP!-PRO)	▲12.48	4 / 60	▼1	▲1st	Opposition (2022–2023)
2020	Anete Jēkabsone-Žogota	44,759	26.14 (AP!-PRO)	▲12.48	4 / 60	▼1	▲1st	Coalition (2023–2025)
2025	Juris Pūce	9,053	4.24	▼21.9	0 / 60	▼4	▼8th	Not represented

== Cohabitation Law initiative ==
On 23 March 2015 party leader Juris Pūce launched a signature collection campaign on ManaBalss.lv for the adoption of a Cohabitation Law in Latvia that received more than 10,000 signatures, but was rejected by the Saeima on 15 March 2018.

== Symbols and logos ==
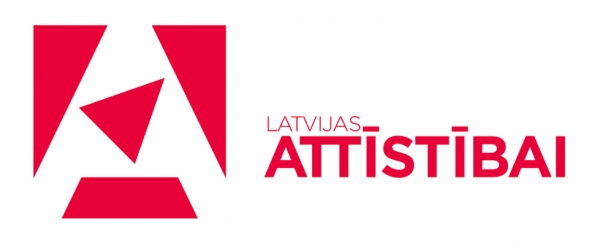
2013–2016

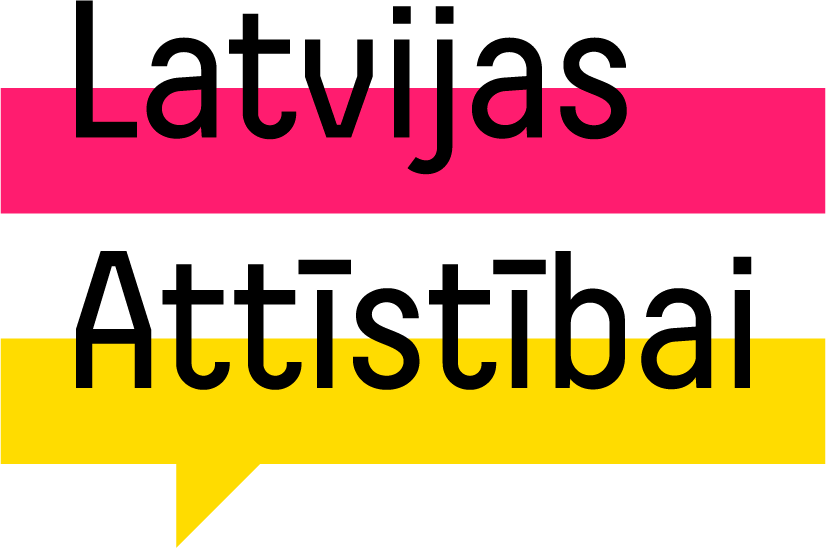
2019–2021

2021-2023
