= 2014 Latvian parliamentary election =

Parliamentary election held in Latvia

- 4 October 2014
Party	Leader	Vote %	Seats	+/–
Harmony	Nils Ušakovs	23.15	24	−7
Unity	Laimdota Straujuma	22.01	23	−19
ZZS	Raimonds Vējonis	19.66	21	+8
NA	Raivis Dzintars	16.72	17	+3
NSL	Inguna Sudraba	6.85	7	New
LRA	Mārtiņš Bondars	6.66	8	New
This lists parties that won seats. See the complete results below.
Results by electoral district
Prime Minister before	Prime Minister after
Laimdota Straujuma; Unity	Laimdota Straujuma; Unity

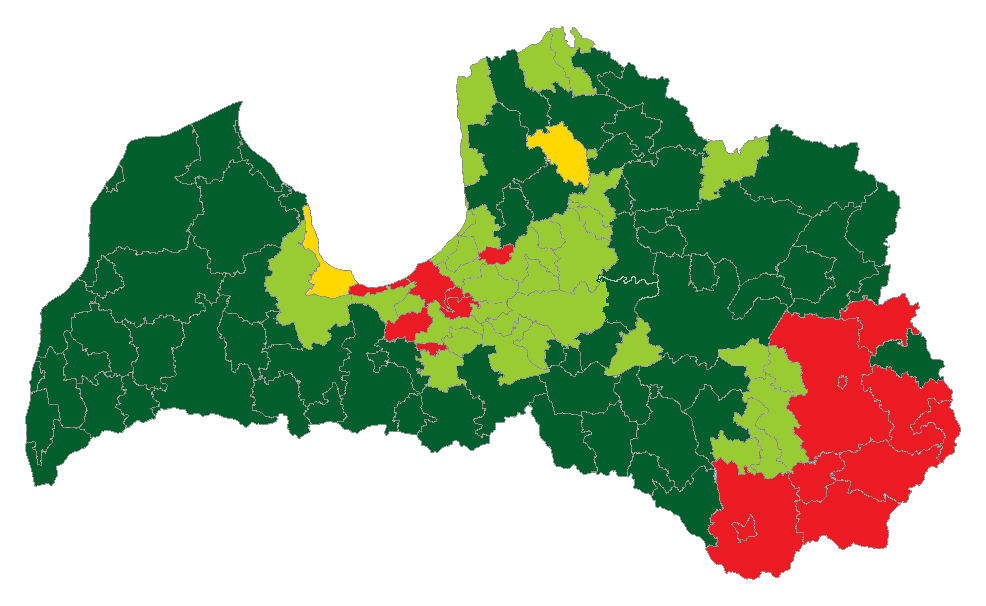
Strongest political party by municipality

Parliamentary elections were held in Latvia on 4 October 2014. The previous elections were held in 2011, but according to the country's constitution, the parliamentary term was reduced to only three years following early elections (the 2011 elections took place a year after the 2010 elections).

== Campaign ==
On 27 December 2013, the Reform Party announced an electoral pact with its government coalition partner Unity, with most prominent Reform Party candidates running under the Unity campaign. On 16 July 2014 the Latvian Social Democratic Workers' Party signed a cooperation pact with the Latvian Association of Regions to run under the LAR campaign.

The main party of the Harmony Centre alliance, the Social Democratic Party "Harmony" contested the elections with a separate list, while fellow alliance members the Latvian Socialist Party announced on 20 July 2014 that they would not contest the election.

== Results ==
Party	Votes	%	Seats	+/–
Social Democratic Party "Harmony"	209,887	23.15	24	–7
Unity	199,535	22.01	23	–19
Union of Greens and Farmers	178,210	19.66	21	+8
National Alliance	151,567	16.72	17	+3
For Latvia from the Heart	62,521	6.90	7	New
Latvian Association of Regions	60,812	6.71	8	New
Latvian Russian Union	14,390	1.59	0	0
United for Latvia	10,788	1.19	0	New
For Latvia's Development	8,156	0.90	0	New
New Conservative Party	6,389	0.70	0	New
Freedom. Free from Fear, Hate and Anger	1,735	0.19	0	0
Izaugsme	1,515	0.17	0	New
Sovereignty	1,033	0.11	0	New
Total	906,538	100.00	100	0
Valid votes	906,538	99.24		
Invalid/blank votes	6,953	0.76		
Total votes	913,491	100.00		
Registered voters/turnout	1,552,235	58.85		
Source: CVK

== Aftermath ==
Following the elections, a centre-right coalition government was formed by Unity, the Union of Greens and Farmers and the National Alliance. However, the government resigned on 7 December 2015.
