= Andrejs Žagars =

Latvian actor, opera director, entrepreneur, and politician (1958–2019)

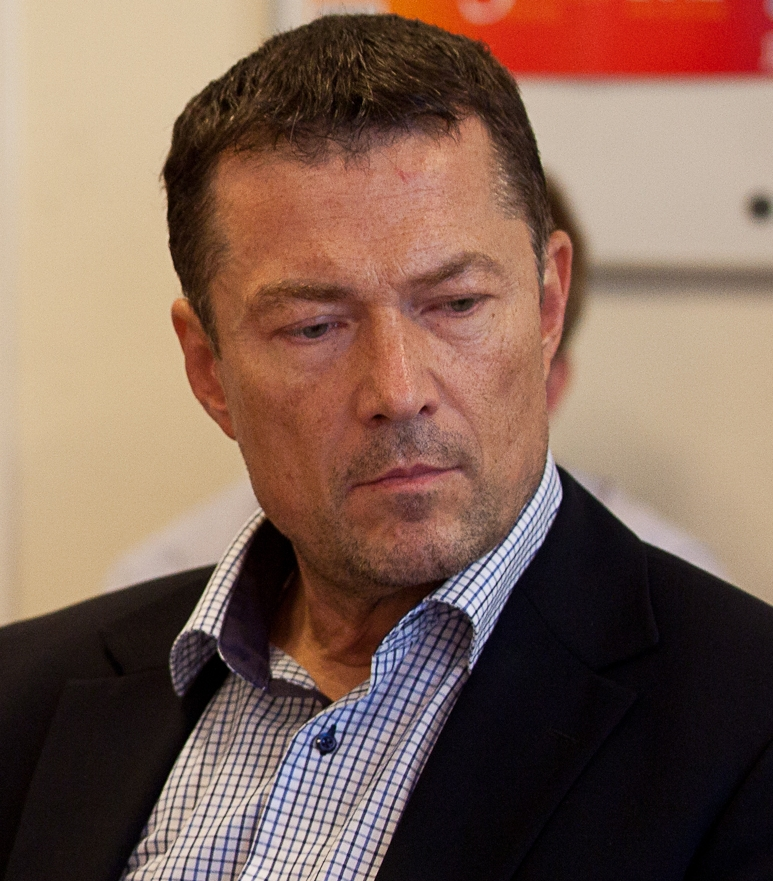
- Žagars in 2012
- Born: 16 October 1958; Chernogorsk, Krasnoyarsk Krai, Soviet Union
- Died: 26 February 2019 (aged 60); Latvia
- Occupations: Actor, opera director, entrepreneur and politician
- Years active: 1978–2019
- Awards: Order of the Three Stars (2002)

Andrejs Žagars (16 October 1958 – 26 February 2019) was a Soviet-born (Siberian) Latvian actor of film, stage and television, opera director, entrepreneur and politician.

== Career ==
He was the head of the Latvian National Opera from 1996 to 2013.

== Personal life ==
His brother, Juris Žagars, is also an actor and, since 2019, director of Riga's Dailes Theatre.

== See also ==
- List of Latvians
- List of opera directors
