= Development/For! =

Political alliance in Latvia

Development/For! Attīstībai/Par!
- Abbreviation: AP!
- Chairman: Daniels Pavļuts; Ivars Ijabs (acting)
- Founded: 20 April 2018
- Dissolved: 25 November 2022 (de facto)
- Headquarters: Torņa iela 4, III-C 101, Riga
- Ideology: Liberalism
- Political position: Centre to centre-right
- European Parliament group: Renew Europe
- Members: Movement For!; For Latvia's Development; Izaugsme
- Colours: Yellow

Website
- attistibaipar.lv

Development/For! (Latvian: Attīstībai/Par!, AP!) was a liberal political alliance in Latvia. It was formed in 2018 and was composed of Movement For! (Par), For Latvia's Development (LA) and Izaugsme.

The alliance embraced a centrist position, and was variously described as social-liberal and classical-liberal views. It is oriented towards pro-Europeanism, and it states "a modern and just Latvia within a united Europe" as its main goal. The two main components of the alliance, LA and Par, are both member parties of the Alliance of Liberals and Democrats for Europe (ALDE) party. The alliance was led by its co-chairmen, Daniels Pavļuts, member of Saeima and the leader of Par, and Juris Pūce, Minister for Environmental Protection and Regional Development and the leader of LA.

In the 2018 parliamentary election it placed fourth by winning 13 seats in Saeima. From January 2019 the alliance participated in the first Kariņš cabinet, holding seven ministerial positions including Artis Pabriks's being appointed Deputy Prime Minister. In the 2019 European Parliament election, the alliance received one of the eight seats allocated to Latvia, with the frontrunner of the list, political scientist Ivars Ijabs being elected. Ijabs was at that time not a member of any of the parties making up the alliance, although he announced that he would represent the ALDE party. Ijabs as well as deputy prime minister and defence minister Artis Pabriks joined For Latvia's Development in October 2019.

In the 2020 Riga City Council snap election, the alliance ran on a common electoral list with the centre-left Progressives, which won the election with 26 percent of the vote and received 18 seats, seven of which were won by AP! candidates from all parties except Growth. Movement For! member Mārtiņš Staķis became mayor until his resignation in 2023.

Gradually, years of being in government – both on a national and municipal scale – in the midst of a pandemic and cabinet infighting eroded much of the alliance’s voter base, as one author puts it. After disappointing results from the 2022 parliamentary election, in which the alliance failed to return its parliamentary seats, the alliance was technically dissolved, though it remains registered to maintain state funding under the legal name of PLI (an abbreviation of the initials of the names of the former constituent parties).

== Members ==
Name	Ideology	Position	Leader	Saeima	MEPs
Movement For! Kustība Par!	Social liberalism	Centre	Daniels Pavļuts	0 / 100	0 / 8
For Latvia's Development; Latvijas attīstībai	Classical liberalism	Centre-right	Ivars Ijabs; Artūrs Toms Plešs; Elīna Stapulone	0 / 100	1 / 8
Growth; Izaugsme	Regionalism	Centre	Andris Skride	0 / 100	0 / 8

== Election results ==
=== Legislative elections ===
Election	Party leader	Performance					Rank	Government
Election	Party leader	Votes	%	± pp	Seats	+/–	Rank	Government
2018	Artis Pabriks	101,685	12.12	New	13 / 100	New	4th	Coalition
2022	Artis Pabriks	45,452	4.97	▼7.15	0 / 100	▼13	▼8th	Extra-parliamentary

=== European Parliament ===
Election	Leader	Votes	%	Seats	+/–
2019	Ivars Ijabs	58,763	12.49 (No. 4)	1 / 8	
