= Latvian Association of Regions =

Latvian political party

Latvian Association of Regions Latvijas Reģionu apvienība
- Abbreviation: LRA
- Leader: Edvards Smiltēns
- Founder: Mārtiņš Bondars
- Founded: 13 March 2014; 12 years ago (alliance); 29 August 2020; 6 years ago (party)
- Merger of: Regional Alliance; For Ogre Municipality
- Headquarters: Riga, Mazā Smilšu iela 12–3, LV-1050
- Membership (2019): ▲2,000
- Ideology: Regionalism
- Political position: Centre
- National affiliation: United List
- Colours: Maroon; Navy blue
- Saeima: 18 / 100
- European Parliament: 0 / 8
- Riga City Council: 2 / 60
- Mayors: 7 / 43

Website
- apvieniba.lv

The Latvian Association of Regions or Latvian Regional Alliance (Latvian: Latvijas Reģionu apvienība, LRA) is a centrist political party in Latvia.

It was founded as an alliance on 13 March 2014 and is headed by former Unity MP Edvards Smiltēns.

== History ==
The alliance won 8 seats in the Saeima at the 2014 parliamentary election. It contested the elections as a political alliance of several smaller regionalist parties, including the Regional Alliance, the LSDSP, the Christian Democratic Union and the Vidzeme Party. The first leader of the LRA was Mārtiņš Bondars until stepping down and leaving the alliance in 2017, after which he was succeeded by Nellija Kleinberga.

In the lead up to the 2018 elections, the LSDSP and the Christian Democrats left the alliance, which eventually fell just short of the 5% barrier at the polls. An even closer result came in the 2019 European Parliament elections, where the LRA lacked 0.02 percent to reach the minimum threshold of votes needed for gaining a seat.

On 22 August 2020, two of the parties making up the alliance – For Ogre Municipality (Latvian: Ogres novadam) and the Regional Alliance voted to reorganize LRA into a single political party. The other members – the Vidzeme Party and three NGOs voted to continue as affiliated cooperation partners under the LRA banner.

In May 2022 the LRA formed a united list for the 2022 Saeima elections together with the Latvian Green Party (former ZZS member), the Liepāja Party (former ZZS partner) and an upcoming political NGO led by Liepāja construction contractor Uldis Pīlēns. The interim name of the ticket was reported as "United List of Latvia" or "Latvia United List" (Latvian: Latvijas apvienotais saraksts) (previously "Power of Regions" (Reģionu spēks) was suggested). The NGO led by Pīlēns scheduled its founding event for July 1st and announced that it would be called Apvienotais Latvijas saraksts or the United List.

== Election results ==
=== Legislative elections ===
Election	Party leader	Performance					Rank	Government
Election	Party leader	Votes	%	± pp	Seats	+/–	Rank	Government
2014	Mārtiņš Bondars	60,812	6.71	New	8 / 100	New	5th	Opposition
2018	Edvards Smiltēns	35,018	4.17	▼2.54	0 / 100	▼8	▼8th	Extra-parliamentary
2022 (Note: AS list won 15 seats; 7 to LRA, 4 to LZP, 1 to LP and 3 to independents.)	Edvards Smiltēns	100,631	11.14	▲6.97	7 / 100	▲7	▲3rd	Coalition (2022-2023)
2022	Edvards Smiltēns	100,631	11.14	▲6.97	7 / 100	▲7	▲3rd	Opposition (2023-)
2026 (Note: AS list won 41 seats; 18 to LRA, 13 to LZP, 3 LP, 1 to Izaugsme and 6 to independents.)	Edvards Smiltēns	283,892	35.76	▲24.62	18 / 100	▲11	▲1st	TBA

=== European Parliament elections ===
Election	List leader	Votes	%	Seats	+/–	EP Group
2014	Mārtiņš Bondars	11,035	2.5 (#3)	0 / 8	New	–
2019	Edvards Smiltēns	23,581	5.01 (#7)	0 / 8	0	–
2024 (Note: The United List list won 1 seat, that went to an independent)	Reinis Pozņaks	42,551	8.27 (#4)	0 / 9	0	–
