= Fourteenth Saeima of Latvia =

Parliament of Latvia 2022–2026

←	Thirteenth Saeima of Latvia	Fifteenth Saeima of Latvia	→
- Current seating chart of the 14th Saeima

Overview
- Legislative body: Saeima
- Jurisdiction: Latvia
- Term: 1 November 2022— 3 November 2026
- Website: www.saeima.lv
- Members: 100
- Speaker: Daiga Mieriņa
- Vice-Speakers: Zanda Kalniņa-Lukaševica; Antoņina Ņenaševa

The Fourteenth Saeima of Latvia (Latvian: 14. Saeima) was elected in the 2022 Latvian parliamentary election held on 1 October 2022.

== Election ==
The 100 members of the Saeima are elected by open list proportional representation from five multi-member constituencies (Kurzeme, Latgale, Riga (in which overseas votes are counted), Vidzeme and Zemgale) between 12 and 36 seats in size. Seats are allocated using the Sainte-Laguë method with a national electoral threshold of 5%.

Graph of the party split among 100 seats.
Party	Votes	%	Seats	+/–
New Unity (JV)	173,425	18.97	26	+18
Union of Greens and Farmers (ZZS)	113,676	12.44	16	+5
United List (AS)	100,631	11.01	15	New
National Alliance (NA)	84,939	9.29	13	0
For Stability! (S!)	62,168	6.80	11	New
Latvia First (LPV)	57,033	6.24	9	New
The Progressives (PRO)	56,327	6.16	10	+10
Development/For! (AP!)	45,452	4.97	0	–13
Harmony (S)	43,943	4.81	0	–23
For Each and Every One (KuK)	33,578	3.67	0	New
Latvian Russian Union (LKS)	33,203	3.63	0	0
Sovereign Power (SV)	29,603	3.24	0	New
The Conservatives (K)	28,270	3.09	0	–16
Republic (R)	16,088	1.76	0	New
Force of People's Power (TVS)	10,350	1.13	0	New
People's Servants for Latvia (TKL)	9,176	1.00	0	0
Union for Latvia (AL)	2,985	0.33	0	–16
United for Latvia (VL)	1,413	0.15	0	New
Progressive Christian Party (KPP)	1,379	0.15	0	New
Blank votes	10,383	1.14	–	–
Total	914,022	100.00	100	0
Valid votes	903,511	99.70		
Invalid/blank votes	2,714	0.30		
Total votes	906,225	100.00		
Registered voters/turnout	1,542,407	58.75		
Source: CVK

== Composition ==
This list contains all 100 MPs who have served in the Fourteenth Saeima, including 14 ministers within the Siliņa cabinet and the prime minister.

Constituency	Deputy	Party	Group	Birth year	Notes
Riga	Edgars Rinkēvičs	JV (V)	JV	1973	Temporarily resigned after becoming the Minister for Foreign Affairs on December 15, 2022. Permanently resigned on June 22, 2023, after being elected President of Latvia.
Vidzeme	Arturs Krišjānis Kariņš	JV (V)	JV	1964	Temporarily resigned after becoming the Prime Minister on December 15, 2022. Permanently resigned on August 29, 2024.
Riga	Andrejs Judins	JV (V)	JV	1970	
Vidzeme	Ainars Latkovskis	JV (V)	JV	1967	
Riga	Inese Lībiņa-Egnere	JV (V)	JV	1977	Temporarily resigned after becoming the Minister for Justice on December 15, 2022.
Vidzeme	Evika Siliņa	JV (V)	JV	1975	Temporarily resigned after becoming the Prime Minister on September 15, 2023.
Vidzeme	Hosams Abu Meri	JV (V)	JV	1974	Temporarily resigned after becoming the Minister of Health on September 15, 2023.
Vidzeme	Raimonds Čudars	JV (V)	JV	1974	Temporarily resigned after becoming the Minister for Climate and Energy on December 15, 2022. Returned to the parliament after the new government was approved on September 15, 2023.
Vidzeme	Andrejs Ceļapīters	JV (V)	JV	1964	
Riga	Irma Kalniņa	JV (V)	JV	1950	
Vidzeme	Jānis Skrastiņš	JV (VuV)	JV	1970	
Riga	Zanda Kalniņa-Lukaševica	JV (V)	JV	1978	
Riga	Dāvis Mārtiņš Daugavietis	JV (V)	JV	1996	
Riga	Zane Skujiņa	JV (V)	JV	1993	
Riga	Uģis Rotbergs	JV (V)	JV	1961	
Vidzeme	Agita Zariņa-Stūre	JV (V)	JV	1971	
Vidzeme	Ilze Vergina	JV (V)	JV	1969	Became an MP temporarily after 2nd Kariņš Cabinet was approved on December 15, 2022. Became an MP permanently after Krišjānis Kariņš resignation got approved by the president.
Riga	Jānis Patmalnieks	JV (V)	JV	1980	
Riga	Agnese Krasta	JV (V)	JV	1986	
Vidzeme	Atis Labucis	JV (V)	JV	1986	Became an MP temporarily after 2nd Kariņš Cabinet was approved on December 15, 2022.
Riga	Inese Kalniņa	JV (V)	JV	1967	
Vidzeme	Viktorija Baire	JV (V)	JV	1982	Became an MP temporarily after 2nd Kariņš Cabinet was approved on December 15, 2022. Stopped her MP duties on September 19, 2023 after new government was approved, and MPs Arturs Krišjānis Kariņš and Raimonds Čudars returned to their seats.
Riga	Edmunds Jurēvics	JV (V)	JV	1992	Became an MP temporarily after 2nd Kariņš Cabinet was approved on December 15, 2022. Became an MP permanently on June 22, 2023 after Edgars Rinkēvičs resigned after being elected as the President of Latvia.
Riga	Gatis Liepiņš	JV (V)	JV	1989	Became an MP temporarily after 2nd Kariņš Cabinet was approved on December 15, 2022.
Semigallia	Anda Čakša	JV (V)	JV	1974	Temporarily resigned after becoming the Minister for Education and Science on December 15, 2022.
Semigallia	Mārtiņš Felss	JV (V)	JV	1984	
Semigallia	Mārtiņš Daģis	JV (V)	JV	1976	
Semigallia	Jānis Reirs	JV (V)	JV	1961	Became an MP temporarily after 2nd Kariņš Cabinet was approved on December 15, 2022.
Courland	Arvils Ašeradens	JV (V)	JV	1962	Temporarily resigned after becoming the Minister for Finance on December 15, 2022.
Courland	Inga Bērziņa	JV (KN)	JV	1963	Temporarily resigned after becoming the Minister of the Smart Administration and Regional Development on September 20, 2023.
Courland	Ingrīda Circene	JV (V)	JV	1956	Became an MP temporarily after 2nd Kariņš Cabinet was approved on December 15, 2022.
Latgallia	Rihards Kozlovskis	JV (V)	JV	1969	Temporarily resigned after becoming the Minister of Internal Affairs on September 20, 2023.
Latgallia	Anna Rancāne	Ind.	JV	1959	
Vidzeme	Armands Krauze	ZZS (LZS)	ZZS	1970	Temporarily resigned after becoming the Minister of Agriculture on September 20, 2023.
Vidzeme	Juris Jakovins	ZZS (LZS)	ZZS	1961	
Vidzeme	Daiga Mieriņa	ZZS (LZS)	ZZS	1969	
Vidzeme	Harijs Rokpelnis	ZZS (LZS)	ZZS	1987	
Semigallia	Viktors Valainis	ZZS (LZS)	ZZS	1986	
Courland	Uldis Augulis	ZZS (LZS)	ZZS	1972	Temporarily resigned after becoming the Minister of Welfare on September 20, 2023.
Courland	Gundars Daudze	ZZS (LuV)	ZZS	1965	Didn't attend the first sitting, became an MP on November 17, 2022.
Semigallia	Andris Bērziņš	ZZS (LZS)	ZZS	1955	
Semigallia	Līga Kļaviņa	ZZS (LZS)	ZZS	1968	
Courland	Jānis Vucāns	ZZS (LuV)	ZZS	1956	
Latgallia	Kaspars Melnis	ZZS (LZS)	ZZS	1989	
Riga	Gunārs Kūtris	Ind.	ZZS	1960	
Latgallia	Līga Kozlovska	ZZS (LZS)	ZZS	1957	
Latgallia	Anita Brakovska	ZZS (LSDSP)	ZZS	1961	
Riga	Augusts Brigmanis	ZZS (LZS)	ZZS	1952	
Riga	Andrejs Vilks	ZZS (LSDSP)	ZZS	1954	
Vidzeme	Raimonds Bergmanis	AS (LZP)	AS	1966	
Vidzeme	Edvards Smiltēns	AS (LRA)	AS	1984	
Vidzeme	Māris Sprindžuks	AS (LRA)	AS	1971	Temporarily resigned after becoming the Minister for Environment and Regions on December 15, 2022. Returned to his seat after Siliņa Cabinet was approved on September 15, 2023.
Vidzeme	Česlavs Batņa	AS (LRA)	AS	1979	
Vidzeme	Aiva Vīksna	AS (Ind.)	AS	1967	
Livonia	Andrejs Svilāns	AS (LZP)	AS	1968	Became an MP temporarily after 2nd Kariņš Cabinet was approved on December 15, 2022. Stopped his MP duties on September 19, 2023 after new government was approved, and MP Māris Sprindžuks returned to the seat.
Courland	Māris Kučinskis	AS (LP)	AS	1961	Temporarily resigned after becoming the Minister for the Interior on December 15, 2022. Returned to his seat after Siliņa Cabinet was approved on September 15, 2023.
Courland	Linda Matisone	AS (LRA)	AS	1976	
Courland	Atis Deksnis	AS (LRA)	AS	1973	Died on September 25, 2023.
Courland	Edgars Putra	AS (LP)	AS	1983	Became an MP temporarily after 2nd Kariņš Cabinet was approved on December 15, 2022. Stopped his MP duties on September 19, 2023 after new government was approved, and MP Māris Kučinskis returned to his seats.
Riga	Igors Rajevs	AS (Ind.)	AS	1965	
Riga	Didzis Šmits	AS (LZP)	AS	1975	Temporarily resigned after becoming the Minister for Agriculture on December 15, 2022. Returned to his seat after Siliņa Cabinet was approved on September 15, 2023.
Riga	Andris Kulbergs	AS (Ind.)	AS	1979	
Riga	Lauris Lizbovskis	AS (LRA)	AS	1973	
Riga	Ieva Brante	AS (LRA)	AS	1979	Became an MP temporarily after 2nd Kariņš Cabinet was approved on December 15, 2022. Stopped her MP duties on September 19, 2023 after new government was approved, and MP Dzidzis Šmits returned to his seat.
Semigallia	Ingmārs Līdaka	AS (LZP)	AS	1966	
Semigallia	Edgars Tavars	AS (LZP)	AS	1982	
Latgallia	Juris Viļums	AS (LRA)	AS	1982	
Vidzeme	Raivis Dzintars	NA	NA	1982	
Vidzeme	Uģis Mitrevics	NA	NA	1967	
Vidzeme	Jānis Dombrava	NA	NA	1988	
Vidzeme	Jānis Grasbergs	NA	NA	1986	
Riga	Ināra Mūrniece	NA	NA	1970	Temporarily resigned after becoming the Minister for Defense on December 15, 2022. Returned to her seat after Siliņa Cabinet was approved on September 15, 2023.
Riga	Rihards Kols	NA	NA	1984	Temporarily resigned after becoming the European Parliament MP on July 15, 2024.
Riga	Nauris Puntulis	NA	NA	1961	Temporarily resigned after becoming the Minister for Culture on December 15, 2022. Returned to his seat after Siliņa Cabinet was approved on September 15, 2023.
Riga	Aleksandrs Kiršteins	NA	NA	1948	
Riga	Jurģis Klotiņš	NA	NA	1985	Became an MP temporarily after 2nd Kariņš Cabinet was approved on December 15, 2022. Stopped his MP duties on September 19, 2023 after new government was approved, and MP Ināra Mūrniece returned to her seat.
Riga	Ģirts Lapiņš	NA	NA	1976	Became an MP temporarily after 2nd Kariņš Cabinet was approved on December 15, 2022. Stopped his MP duties on September 19, 2023 after new government was approved, and MP Nauris Puntulis returned to his seat.
Semigallia	Jānis Vitenbergs	NA	NA	1985	
Semigallia	Edvīns Šnore	NA	NA	1974	
Semigallia	Arnolds Jātnieks	NA	NA	1965	Became an MP temporarily after 2nd Kariņš Cabinet was approved on December 15, 2022. Stopped his MP duties on September 19, 2023 after new government was approved, and MP Jānis Vitenbergs returned to his seats.
Courland	Ilze Indriksone	NA	NA	1974	Temporarily resigned after becoming the Minister for Economics on December 15, 2022. Returned to his seat after Siliņa Cabinet was approved on September 15, 2023.
Courland	Artūrs Butāns	NA	NA	1992	
Courland	Normunds Dzintars	NA	NA	1971	Became an MP temporarily after 2nd Kariņš Cabinet was approved on December 15, 2022. Stopped his MP duties on September 19, 2023 after new government was approved, and MP Ilze Indriksone returned to her seat.
Latgallia	Edmunds Teirumnieks	NA	NA	1977	
Riga	Aleksejs Rosļikovs	S!	S!	1984	
Riga	Svetlana Čulkova	S!	S!	1989	
Riga	Nataļja Marčenko-Jodko	S!	S!	1978	
Riga	Igors Judins	S!	S!	1978	
Riga	Jefimijs Klementjevs	S!	S!	1963	
Latgallia	Viktorija Pleškāne	S!	S!	1975	
Latgallia	Viktors Pučka	S!	S!	1974	
Latgallia	Nadežda Tretjakova	S!	S!	1976	Resigned an hour after becoming an MP on November 1, 2022.
Latgallia	Iļja Ivanovs	S!	S!	1999	
Latgallia	Jekaterina Drelinga	S!	S!	1997	Became an MP on November 17, 2022, replacing MP Tretjakova.
Semigallia	Dmitrijs Kovaļenko	S!	S!	1978	
Riga	Andris Sprūds	P	P	1971	Elected as an independent from the P party list, joined the party in September 2023.
Riga	Andris Šuvajevs	P	P	1991	
Riga	Antoņina Ņenaševa	P	P	1988	
Riga	Skaidrīte Ābrama	P	P	1956	Elected as an independent from the P party list, joined the party on October 28, 2022.
Riga	Edmunds Cepurītis	P	P	1991	
Livonia	Kaspars Briškens	P	P	1982	Temporarily resigned after becoming the Minister of Transport on September 15, 2023.
Livonia	Jana Simanovska	P	P	1971	
Courland	Edgars Zelderis	MTuN	P	1983	
Semigallia	Atis Švinka	P	P	1973	
Latgallia	Leila Rasima	P	P	1987	
Riga	Ainārs Šlesers	LPV	LPV	1970	
Riga	Mārcis Jencītis	LPV	LPV	1970	
Riga	Kristaps Krištopans	LPV	LPV	1983	
Vidzeme	Ričards Šlesers	LPV	LPV	1997	
Vidzeme	Linda Liepiņa	LPV	LPV	1974	
Latgallia	Vilis Krištopans	LPV	LPV	1954	Temporarily resigned after becoming the European Parliament MP on July 15, 2024.
Semigallia	Edmunds Zivtiņš	LPV	LPV	1969	
Courland	Ramona Petraviča	LPV	LPV	1967	
Riga	Oļegs Burovs	GKR	Ind.	1960	Left the Latvia First Saeima fraction on June 19, 2023, citing disappointment in fraction's increasing cooperation with the For Stability! party.
Vidzeme	Glorija Grevcova	AJ	Ind.	1988	Left the For Stability! party and its Saeima fraction on March 17, 2023, after being found guilty of lying to the Central Election Commission about her past by Rīga Pārdaugava Court. In May 2023, joined the Alliance of Young Latvians. Lost the mandate on February 15, 2024 after being indicted for giving false information to the Central Election Commission.
