= Ilze Vergina =

Latvian educator and politician

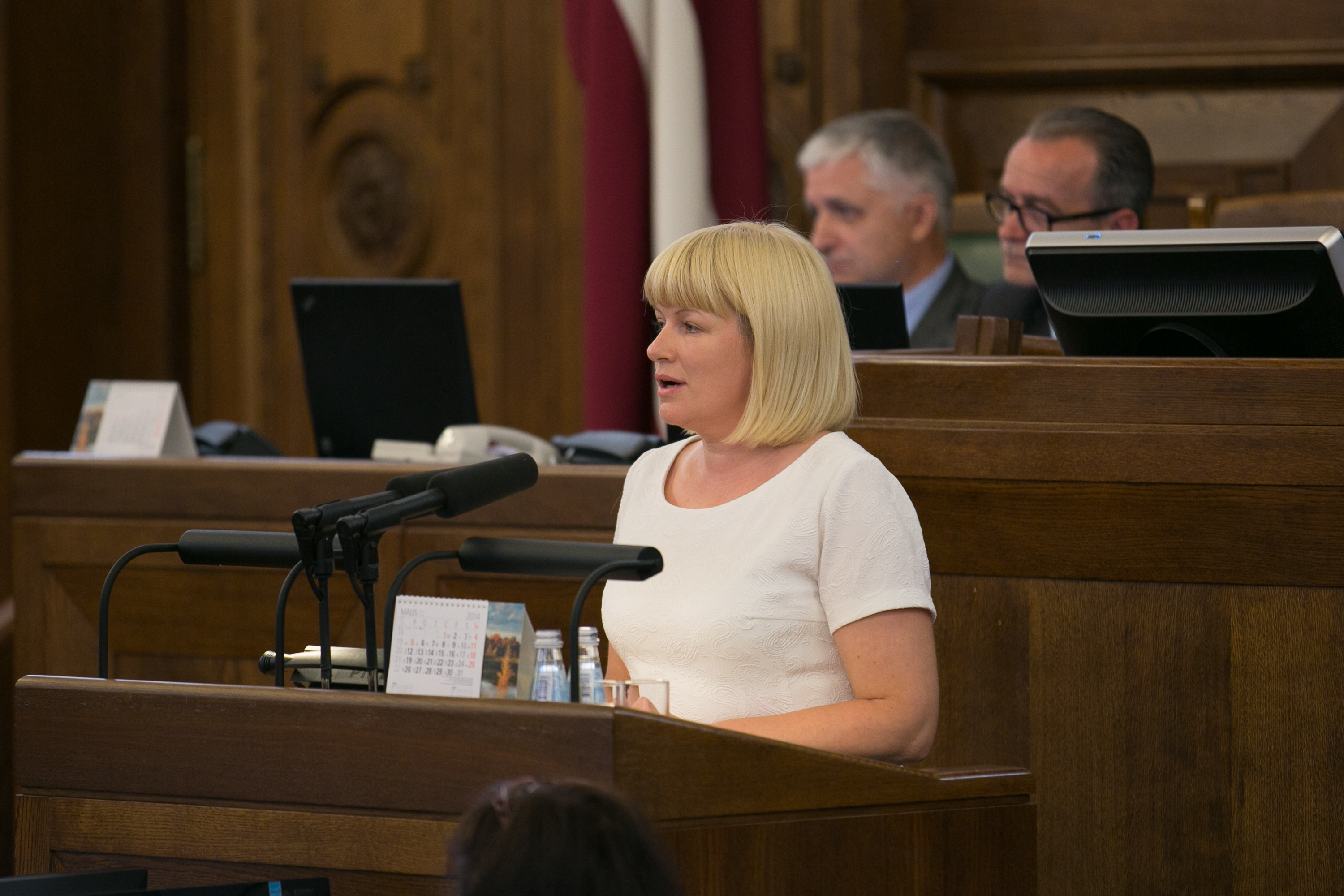
- Ilze Vergina at the Parliament session in 2014

Member of the 14th Saeima
- Incumbent
- Assumed office November 1, 2022
- President: Egils Levits
- Prime Minister: Arturs Krišjānis Kariņš
- President: Edgars Rinkēvičs
- Prime Minister: Evika Siliņa

Personal details
- Born: July 15, 1969 (age 57)
- Party: New Unity
- Education: University of Liepāja
- Occupation: Educator, politician

Ilze Vergina (born July 15, 1969) is a Latvian educator and politician. She has served as a member of the 10th and 11th Saeima. Currently, she is a member of the 14th Saeima, representing the party "New Unity".

== Biography ==
Vergina graduated from Dzērbene Secondary School in 1987. From 1987 to 1992, she studied at the University of Liepāja, where she obtained a qualification as a Latvian language and literature teacher. In 1996, she earned a Master's degree in Philology from University of Liepāja.

From 1994 to 1999, Vergina worked as a teacher at Vecpiebalga Regional Gymnasium. She then served as a teacher and deputy director for upbringing at Smiltene 2nd Secondary School until 2002, when she became the school's director (since 2005 known as Smiltene Central Secondary School). She also led the Smiltene branch of the Baltic International Academy.

In 2004, Vergina began leading the Smiltene branch of the party "New Era." In 2008, she left the party along with several regional representatives. In April 2008, she was elected to the board of the "Civic Union."

In the 2005 Latvian local elections, she was elected to the Smiltene City Council from the "New Era" list. She was the deputy chair of the council. In the 2009 local elections, she was elected to the Smiltene District Council from the "Civic Union" list. She was also elected to the Smiltene District Council in the 2013 Latvian municipal elections, this time from the "Unity" list.

In 2010, she was elected to the 10th Saeima from the "Unity" list. She ran in the 2011 parliamentary elections but was not elected. In July 2014, she obtained a mandate as a deputy in the 11th Saeima, replacing a member elected to the European Parliament.

In 2022, she ran in the 2022 parliamentary elections from the "New Unity" list but was not elected. However, she soon became a member of the 14th Saeima, with Arturs Krišjānis Kariņš becoming the Prime Minister.
