= 2022 Latvian parliamentary election =

- 1 October 2022
- All 100 seats in the Saeima; 51 seats needed for a majority
- Turnout: 59.41% (▲4.83pp)
Party	Leader	Vote %	Seats	+/–
JV	Krišjānis Kariņš	19.19	26	+18
ZZS	Aivars Lembergs	12.58	16	+5
AS	Uldis Pīlēns	11.14	15	New
NA	Uģis Mitrevics	9.40	13	0
ST!	Aleksejs Rosļikovs	6.88	11	New
LPV	Ainārs Šlesers	6.31	9	New
PRO	Kaspars Briškens	6.23	10	+10
This lists parties that won seats. See the complete results below.
Results by region
Prime Minister before	Prime Minister after
Arturs Krišjānis Kariņš; Unity	Arturs Krišjānis Kariņš; Unity

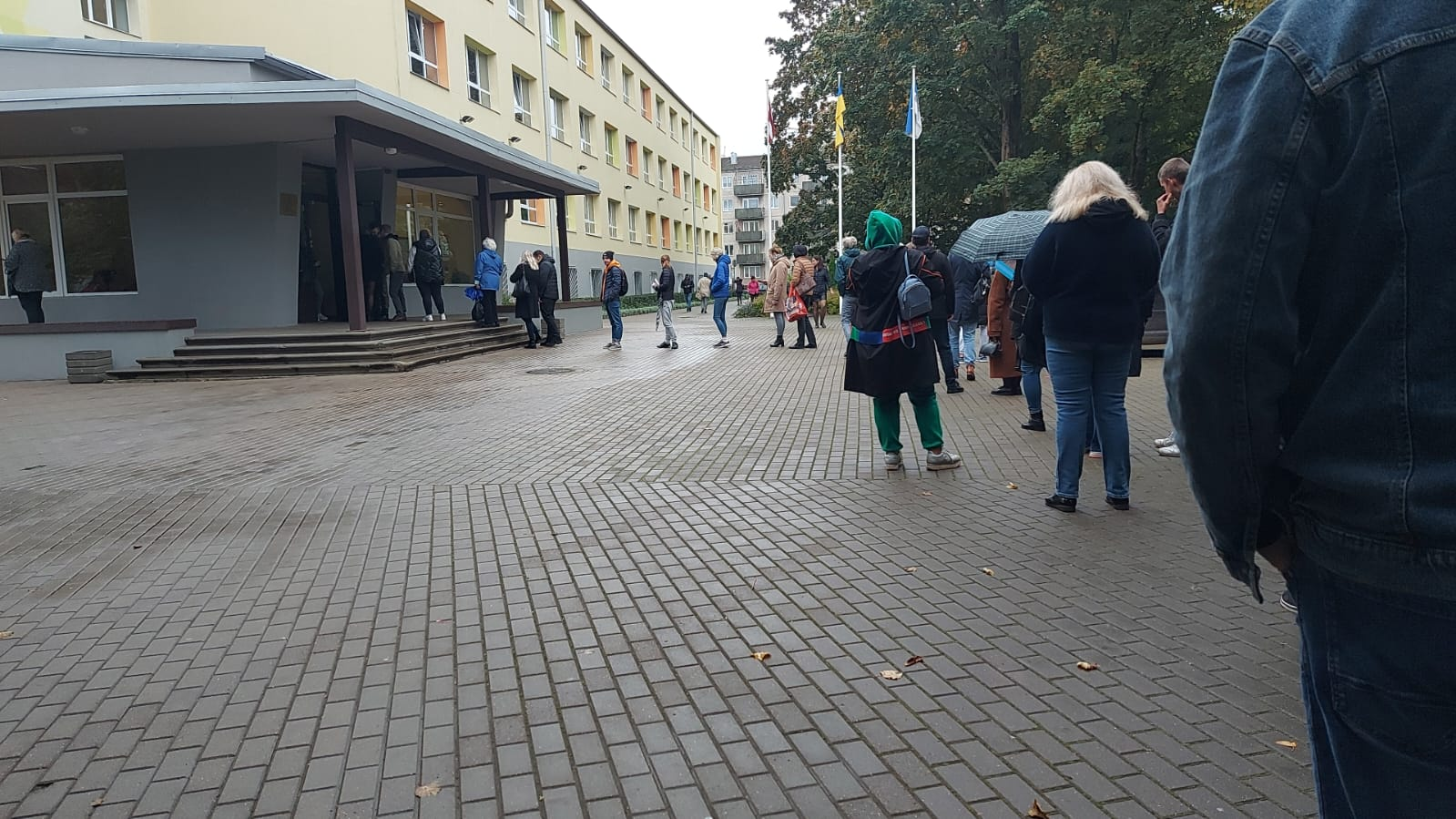
Queue of voters in Riga on election day

Parliamentary elections were held in Latvia on 1 October 2022 to elect the Fourteenth Saeima of Latvia, following the end of the term of the 13th Saeima elected in 2018.

Incumbent Prime Minister Krišjānis Kariņš led his New Unity party and allies to a decisive win in the election which was seen as a decisive victory for pro-Western parties in the country. Karinš went on to form the Second Kariņš cabinet with National Alliance and United List.

== Electoral system ==
The 100 members of the Saeima are elected by open list, proportional representation from five multi-member constituencies ranging in size from 12 to 36 seats and based on the regions of Latvia, with overseas votes included in the Riga constituency. Seats are allocated using the Sainte-Laguë method with a national electoral threshold of 5%. Voters may cast "specific votes" for candidates on the list that they have voted for. This involves drawing a plus sign (+) next to the candidate's names to indicate preference (positive votes), or by crossing out names to indicate disapproval (negative votes). The number of votes for each candidate is the number of votes cast for the list, plus their number of positive votes, minus their number of negative votes. The candidates with the highest vote totals fill their party's seats.

=== Seat redistribution ===
The Central Electoral Commission is required to determine the number of Members of Parliament (MPs) to be elected using the number of eligible voters four months before the election. On 2 June 2022, the Central Electoral Commission has announced the new distribution of MPs. Rīga and Vidzeme constituencies have both gained one seat compared to the 2018 election, while Latgale and Zemgale constituencies have both lost one.

June 2022 redistribution
Constituency	Seats	Change
Rīga	36	▲1
Vidzeme	26	▲1
Latgale	13	▼1
Zemgale	13	▼1
Kurzeme	12	Steady
Total	100	Steady

== Parties ==
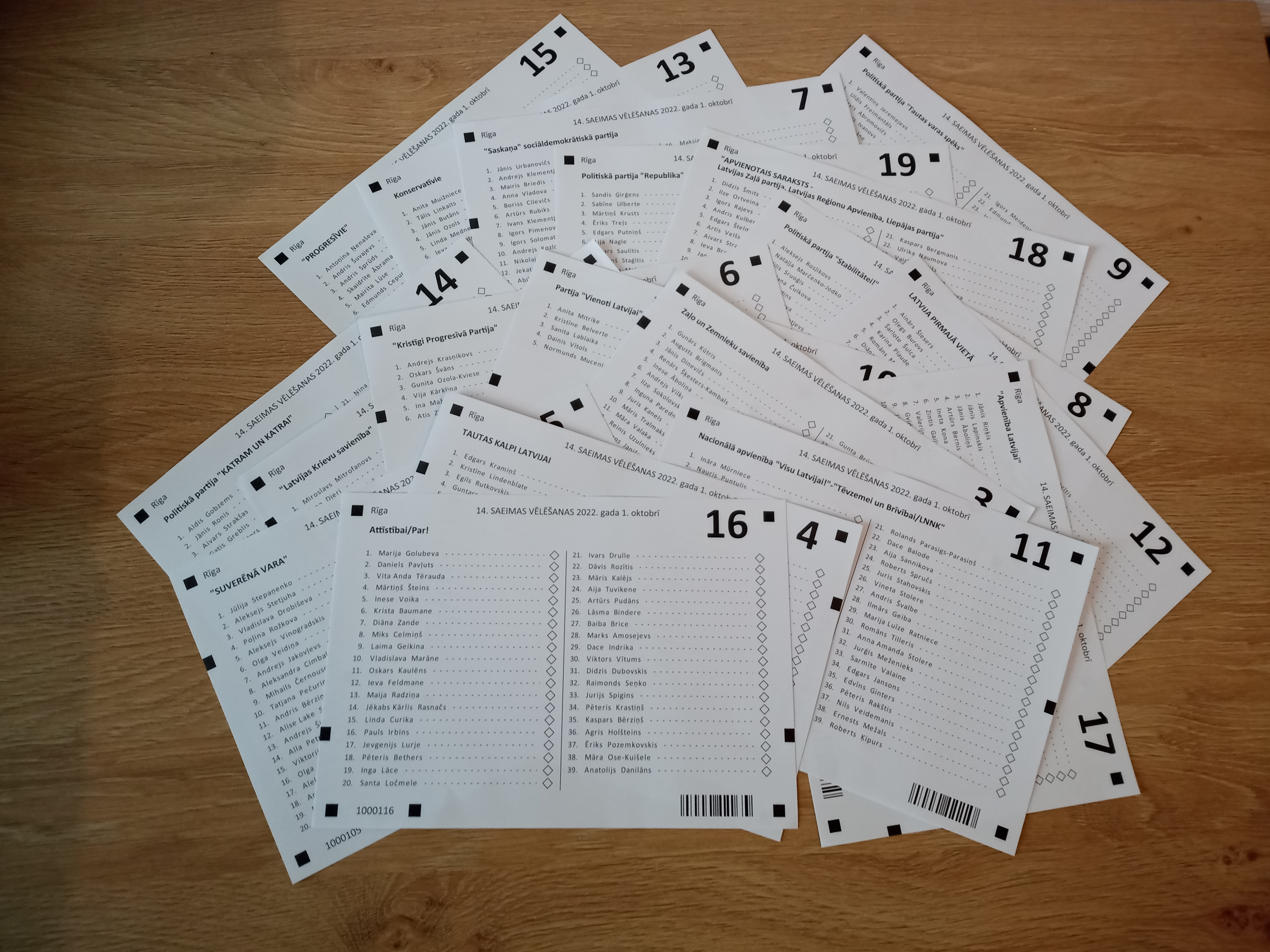
Ballot papers of Riga constituency

=== Lead candidates ===
Latvia First became the first major party to announce Ainārs Šlesers as its candidate for the position of Prime Minister on 14 August, during the founding congress of the party.

Each of the member parties of the Union of Greens and Farmers proposed their own PM candidate to the party alliance board, and then they would decide on the one candidate for the whole party alliance. The Latvian Farmers' Union nominated MP Viktors Valainis as their candidate, while the Green Party kept its candidate secret. In the end, the Greens left the Union and joined the United List alliance.

=== Overview ===
The table below lists parties and party alliances represented in the 13th Saeima.

Name		Ideology	PM candidate	Leader(s)	2018 result		Seats at dissolution
Name		Ideology	PM candidate	Leader(s)	Votes (%)	Seats	Seats at dissolution
S	Harmony; Saskaņa	Social democracy Russian minority politics	Ivars Zariņš	Jānis Urbanovičs	19.8%	23 / 100	18 / 100
K	The Conservatives; Konservatīvie	Liberal conservatism	Jānis Bordāns		13.6%	16 / 100	15 / 100
AP!	Development/For! Attīstībai/Par!	Liberalism	Artis Pabriks	Daniels Pavļuts; Artūrs Toms Plešs	12.0%	13 / 100	14 / 100
NA	National Alliance; Nacionālā apvienība	National conservatism Right-wing populism	Uģis Mitrevics	Raivis Dzintars	11.0%	13 / 100	13 / 100
JV	New Unity; Jaunā Vienotība	Liberal conservatism	Krišjānis Kariņš		6.7%	8 / 100	11 / 100
ZZS	Union of Greens and Farmers; Zaļo un zemnieku savienība	Agrarianism; Conservatism	Aivars Lembergs	Armands Krauze	9.9%	11 / 100	7 / 100
AS	United List; Apvienotais saraksts	Regionalism; Green conservatism	Uldis Pīlēns	Edgars Tavars; Edvards Smiltēns	did not exist		4 / 100
R	Republic; Republika	Centrism	Sandis Ģirģens		did not exist		2 / 100
KuK	For Each and Every One; Katram un katrai	Right-wing populism	Aldis Gobzems		did not exist		2 / 100
LPV	Latvia First; Latvija pirmajā vietā	Social conservatism	Ainārs Šlesers		did not exist		2 / 100
SV	Sovereign Power; Suverēnā vara	Christian right	TBD	Jūlija Stepaņenko	did not exist		2 / 100
PCL	For a Humane Latvia; Par cilvēcīgu Latviju	Right-wing populism Conservatism	TBD	Jurģis Miezainis	14.3%	16 / 100	1 / 100

=== Competing parties ===
Political parties and party alliances are able to submit their electoral lists to the Central Electoral Commission from 13 July until 2 August. So far, four lists have been submitted to and registered by the CEC.

In the table below, the number in each box indicates the number of candidates standing on the party's electoral list in the indicated constituency. The maximum number of candidates on the electoral list in each constituency equals the number of MPs to be elected plus three.

Party	Ideology		PM candidate	Constituency						Date submitted	Source
Party	Ideology		PM candidate	Rīga	Vidzeme	Latgale	Kurzeme	Zemgale	Total	Date submitted	Source
Development/For! (AP!)	Liberalism	Centre to centre-right	A. Pabriks & M. Golubeva	39	29	16	15	16	115	13 July	
For Stability! (S!)	Populism	Centre	Aleksejs Rosļikovs	30	12	10	5	8	65	13 July	
Social Democratic Party "Harmony" (S): Socialist Party of Latvia	Social democracy	Centre-left	Ivars Zariņš	30	16	16	15	10	87	18 July	
The Progressives (P)	Social democracy	Centre-left	Kaspars Briškens	39	29	16	15	16	115	20 July	
New Unity (JV)	Liberal conservatism	Centre-right	Krišjānis Kariņš	39	29	16	15	16	115	25 July	
Latvia First (LPV): Honor to Serve Riga	Right-wing populism	Right-wing	Ainārs Šlesers	39	29	16	15	16	115	25 July	
United List (AS)	Regionalism	Centre to centre-right	Uldis Pīlēns	39	29	16	15	16	115	26 July	
National Alliance (NA)	National conservatism	Right-wing	Uģis Mitrevics	39	29	16	15	16	115	26 July	
Union of Greens and Farmers (ZZS)	Agrarianism	Centre	Aivars Lembergs	39	29	16	15	16	115	27 July	
For Each and Every One (KuK)	Social conservatism	Right-wing	Aldis Gobzems	39	29	16	15	16	115	27 July	
Latvian Russian Union (LKS)	Russian minority politics	Centre	Miroslavs Mitrofanovs	38	22	16	11	15	102	29 July	
Republic (R)	Centrism	Centre	Sandis Ģirģens	39	29	16	15	16	115	29 July	
The Conservatives (K)	Liberal conservatism	Centre-right	Jānis Bordāns	39	29	16	15	16	115	29 July	
Sovereign Power (SV)	Christian right	Right-wing	Jūlija Stepaņenko	39	24	16	11	10	100	1 August	
Force of People's Power (TVS)	Conspiracism	Far-right	Valentīns Jeremejevs	39	28	16	15	16	114	1 August	
People's Servants for Latvia (TKL)	Populism	Centre	Edgars Kramiņš	34	17	11	8	12	82	1 August	
Union for Latvia (AL): Heritage of the Fatherland	Right-wing populism	Right-wing	Māris Možvillo	28	20	12	6	7	73	2 August	
Progressive Christian Party (KPP)	Christian democracy	Centre-right	Andrejs Krasņikovs	12	4	5	5	5	31	2 August	
United for Latvia (VL)	Populism	Centre-right	TBD	10	7	3	4	4	28	2 August	
Maximum candidates				39	29	16	15	16	115		

== Members of the Saeima not standing for re-election ==
List of MPs who announced they will not stand for re-election in 2022
MP	Constituency	First elected	Party	Date announced
Mārtiņš Bondars	Latgale	2014	AP!	31 May 2022
Inga Goldberga	Latgale	2018	S	6 June 2022
Inguna Rībena	Zemgale	2002	Ind.	14 June 2022
Reinis Znotiņš	Rīga	2018	K	7 July 2022
Vladimirs Nikonovs	Latgale	2010	S	18 July 2022
Dagmāra Beitnere-Le Galla	Vidzeme	2018	K	21 July 2022
Atis Lejiņš	Zemgale	2010	JV	25 July 2022
Janīna Jalinska	Latgale	2018	AS	26 July 2022
Ivars Puga	Rīga	2018	NA	26 July 2022
Jānis Dūklavs	Latgale	2010	ZZS	27 July 2022

== Opinion polls ==
Graphical summary

== Results ==
The New Unity party of incumbent prime minister Krišjānis Kariņš received the highest percentage of the vote (19%) and won the most seats (26). In a speech after the election, Kariņš stated that Latvia would continue to support Ukraine against Russia and he stated his preference to maintain the current coalition government. The Union of Greens and Farmers placed second, receiving 13% of the vote, despite leader Aivars Lembergs being sentenced to five years in prison in 2021 and under sanction by the United States. The other parties which placed above the 5% threshold to receive a seat in parliament were the United List with 11%, the National Alliance with 9.3%, For Stability! with 7%, Latvia First with 6%, and The Progressives, who entered parliament for the first time with 6% of the vote.

The wasted vote in this election was 29.09%. Harmony, who had placed first in the previous three general elections, was unable to secure any parliamentary seats, being slightly under the 5% threshold (of all votes, including invalid) with 4.9% of the vote. This has been attributed to many reasons, including internal disputes on the 2022 Russian invasion of Ukraine, pushing away both ethnic Latvians and ethnic Russians. This resulted in much of the ethnic Russian population voting for Stability!, Sovereign Power, and the Latvian Russian Union. The Development/For! alliance, one of the coalition members, also narrowly missed the 5% threshold by just 0.03% (with 4.97% of all votes). Another coalition member, the Conservatives, also failed to cross the 5% threshold, receiving 3% of the vote.

Party	Votes	%	Seats	+/–
New Unity	173,425	19.19	26	+18
Union of Greens and Farmers	113,676	12.58	16	+5
United List	100,631	11.14	15	New
National Alliance	84,939	9.40	13	0
For Stability!	62,168	6.88	11	New
Latvia First	57,033	6.31	9	New
The Progressives	56,327	6.23	10	+10
Development/For!	45,452	5.03	0	–13
Harmony	43,943	4.86	0	–23
For Each and Every One	33,578	3.72	0	New
Latvian Russian Union	33,203	3.67	0	0
Sovereign Power	29,603	3.28	0	New
The Conservatives	28,270	3.13	0	–16
Republic	16,088	1.78	0	New
Force of People's Power	10,350	1.15	0	New
People's Servants for Latvia	9,176	1.02	0	0
Union for Latvia	2,985	0.33	0	–16
United for Latvia	1,413	0.16	0	New
Progressive Christian Party	1,379	0.15	0	New
Total	903,639	100.00	100	0
Valid votes	903,639	98.61		
Invalid/blank votes	12,729	1.39		
Total votes	916,368	100.00		
Registered voters/turnout	1,542,407	59.41		
Source: Central Electoral Commission

=== By constituency ===
Constituency	JV	ZZS	AS	NA	S!	LPV	P
Riga	20.59	5.51	6.91	7.14	9.15	8.59	9.05
Vidzeme	23.46	12.10	12.62	11.39	3.04	5.14	5.95
Latgale	6.97	14.54	5.12	5.78	18.56	6.53	2.46
Zemgale	18.75	19.55	12.42	12.16	3.02	4.56	4.35
Kurzeme	16.44	21.10	22.05	10.25	2.17	4.27	4.80
Total	19.16	12.66	11.00	9.38	6.91	6.31	6.23

=== Seat distribution ===
Constituency	JV	ZZS	AS	NA	S!	LPV	P	Total
Riga	11	3	4	4	5	4	5	36
Vidzeme	8	4	5	4	1	2	2	26
Latgale	2	3	1	1	4	1	1	13
Zemgale	3	3	2	2	1	1	1	13
Kurzeme	2	3	3	2		1	1	12
Total	26	16	15	13	11	9	10	100

=== List of elected Deputies ===
Name	Alliance/party	Party	Constituency	Birth year	Votes
Agita Zariņa-Stūre	JV	VIENOTĪBA	Vidzeme	1971	60,947
Agnese Krasta	JV	VIENOTĪBA	Rīga	1986	60,822
Ainars Latkovskis	JV	VIENOTĪBA	Vidzeme	1967	69,100
Ainārs Šlesers	LPV	LPV	Rīga	1970	41,546
Aiva Vīksna	AS	IND	Vidzeme	1967	33,599
Aleksandrs Kiršteins	NA	NA	Rīga	1948	22,785
Aleksejs Rosļikovs	ST!	ST!	Rīga	1984	46,532
Anda Čakša	JV	VIENOTĪBA	Zemgale	1974	26,799
Andrejs Ceļapīters	JV	VIENOTĪBA	Vidzeme	1964	61,967
Andrejs Judins	JV	VIENOTĪBA	Rīga	1970	69,339
Andrejs Vilks	ZZS	LSDSP	Rīga	1954	16,945
Andris Bērziņš	ZZS	LZS	Zemgale	1955	26,899
Andris Kulbergs	AS	IND	Rīga	1979	22,606
Andris Sprūds	PRO	IND	Rīga	1971	31,739
Andris Šuvajevs	PRO	PRO	Rīga	1991	30,454
Anita Brakovska	ZZS	LSDSP	Latgale	1961	17,312
Anna Rancāne	JV	IND	Latgale	1959	8,466
Antoņina Ņenaševa	PRO	PRO	Rīga	1988	30,296
Armands Krauze	ZZS	LZS	Vidzeme	1970	35,822
Artūrs Butāns	NA	NA	Kurzeme	1992	12,739
Arvils Ašeradens	JV	VIENOTĪBA	Kurzeme	1962	21,556
Atis Švinka	PRO	PRO	Zemgale	1973	6,351
Arturs Krišjānis Kariņš	JV	VIENOTĪBA	Vidzeme	1964	94,158
Atis Deksnis	AS	LRA	Kurzeme	1973	27,182
Augusts Brigmanis	ZZS	LZS	Rīga	1952	17,324
Česlavs Batņa	AS	LRA	Vidzeme	1979	33,748
Daiga Mieriņa	ZZS	LZS	Vidzeme	1969	32,771
Dāvis Mārtiņš Daugavietis	JV	VIENOTĪBA	Rīga	1996	61,182
Didzis Šmits	AS	LZP	Rīga	1975	22,822
Dmitrijs Kovaļenko	ST!	ST!	Zemgale	1978	4,945
Edgars Rinkēvičs	JV	VIENOTĪBA	Rīga	1973	95,119
Edgars Tavars	AS	LZP	Zemgale	1982	17,592
Edgars Zelderis	PRO	MTN	Kurzeme	1983	6,519
Edmunds Cepurītis	PRO	PRO	Rīga	1991	29,474
Edmunds Teirumnieks	NA	NA	Latgale	1977	7,582
Edmunds Zivtiņš	LPV	LPV	Zemgale	1969	6,958
Edvards Smiltēns	AS	LRA	Vidzeme	1984	38,554
Edvīns Šnore	NA	NA	Zemgale	1974	17,722
Evika Siliņa	JV	VIENOTĪBA	Vidzeme	1975	63,840
Glorija Grevcova	ST!	ST!	Vidzeme	1988	10,610
Gunārs Kūtris	ZZS	IND	Rīga	1960	18,438
Gundars Daudze	ZZS	LuV	Kurzeme	1965	27,031
Harijs Rokpelnis	ZZS	LZS	Vidzeme	1987	32,757
Hosams Abu Meri	JV	VIENOTĪBA	Vidzeme	1974	63,414
Igors Judins	ST!	ST!	Rīga	1978	29,780
Igors Rajevs	AS	IND	Rīga	1965	24,272
Iļja Ivanovs	ST!	ST!	Latgale	1999	24,476
Ilze Indriksone	NA	NA	Kurzeme	1974	14,148
Ināra Mūrniece	NA	NA	Rīga	1970	25,226
Inese Kalniņa	JV	VIENOTĪBA	Rīga	1967	60,755
Inese Lībiņa-Egnere	JV	VIENOTĪBA	Rīga	1977	67,168
Inga Bērziņa	JV	KN	Kurzeme	1963	21,267
Ingmārs Līdaka	AS	LZP	Zemgale	1966	18,236
Irma Kalniņa	JV	VIENOTĪBA	Rīga	1950	61,838
Jana Simanovska	PRO	PRO	Vidzeme	1971	16,764
Jānis Dombrava	NA	NA	Vidzeme	1988	34,045
Jānis Grasbergs	NA	NA	Vidzeme	1986	31,188
Jānis Patmalnieks	JV	VIENOTĪBA	Rīga	1980	60,887
Jānis Skrastiņš	JV	VuV	Vidzeme	1970	61,808
Jānis Vitenbergs	NA	NA	Zemgale	1985	18,340
Juris Jakovins	ZZS	LZS	Vidzeme	1961	32,845
Jānis Vucāns	ZZS	LuV	Kurzeme	1956	26,348
Jefimijs Klementjevs	ST!	ST!	Rīga	1963	29,698
Juris Viļums	AS	LRA	Latgale	1982	6,738
Kaspars Briškens	PRO	PRO	Vidzeme	1982	20,008
Kaspars Melnis	ZZS	LZS	Latgale	1989	18,671
Kristaps Krištopans	LPV	LPV	Rīga	1983	26,979
Lauris Lizbovskis	AS	LRA	Rīga	1973	21,352
Leila Rasima	PRO	PRO	Latgale	1987	3,666
Līga Kļaviņa	ZZS	LZS	Zemgale	1968	26,527
Līga Kozlovska	ZZS	LZS	Latgale	1957	17,906
Linda Liepiņa	LPV	LPV	Vidzeme	1974	15,486
Linda Matisone	AS	LRA	Kurzeme	1976	27,312
Mārcis Jencītis	LPV	LPV	Rīga	1970	27,448
Māris Kučinskis	AS	LP	Kurzeme	1961	28,269
Māris Sprindžuks	AS	LRA	Vidzeme	1971	36,142
Mārtiņš Daģis	JV	VIENOTĪBA	Zemgale	1976	24,465
Mārtiņš Felss	JV	VIENOTĪBA	Zemgale	1984	24,648
Nadežda Tretjakova	ST!	ST!	Latgale	1976	24,478
Nataļja Marčenko-Jodko	ST!	ST!	Rīga	1978	30,322
Nauris Puntulis	NA	NA	Rīga	1961	23,010
Oļegs Burovs	LPV	GKR	Rīga	1960	27,239
Raimonds Bergmanis	AS	LZP	Vidzeme	1966	41,201
Raimonds Čudars	JV	VIENOTĪBA	Vidzeme	1974	61,990
Raivis Dzintars	NA	NA	Vidzeme	1982	37,947
Ramona Petraviča	LPV	LPV	Kurzeme	1967	6,334
Ričards Šlesers	LPV	LPV	Vidzeme	1997	16,077
Rihards Kols	NA	NA	Rīga	1984	24,191
Rihards Kozlovskis	JV	VIENOTĪBA	Latgale	1969	8,640
Skaidrīte Ābrama	PRO	IND	Rīga	1956	29,828
Svetlana Čulkova	ST!	ST!	Rīga	1989	30,351
Uģis Mitrevics	NA	NA	Vidzeme	1967	36,428
Uģis Rotbergs	JV	VIENOTĪBA	Rīga	1961	61,056
Uldis Augulis	ZZS	LZS	Kurzeme	1972	27,941
Viktorija Pleškāne	ST!	ST!	Latgale	1975	27,301
Viktors Pučka	ST!	ST!	Latgale	1974	25,028
Viktors Valainis	ZZS	LZS	Zemgale	1986	31,487
Vilis Krištopans	LPV	LPV	Latgale	1954	9,968
Zanda Kalniņa-Lukaševica	JV	VIENOTĪBA	Rīga	1978	61,317
Zane Skujiņa	JV	VIENOTĪBA	Rīga	1993	61,146
Source: Alphabetical list of candidates - Centrālā vēlēšanu komisija - CVK - Results of the 14th Saeima elections - Centrālā vēlēšanu komisija - CVK

== Aftermath ==
On 3 October 2022, President Egils Levits authorized Kariņš, the incumbent Prime Minister and leader of New Unity, to form a coalition government. New Unity explored coalition options with Union of Greens and Farmers and the Progressives, but they fell though. Kariņš formed a government with United List and National Alliance, sworn in on 14 December. This government lasted until proposed changes to the make-up of cabinet caused the other parties to pull out and led to Kariņš's resignation as Prime Minister in August 2023. The government was succeeded by a New Unity–Union of Greens and Farmers–Progressives government led by Evika Siliņa, which was sworn in on 14 September 2023.

== See also ==
- Fourteenth Saeima of Latvia
