= Andrejs Svilāns =

Latvian politician and biologist

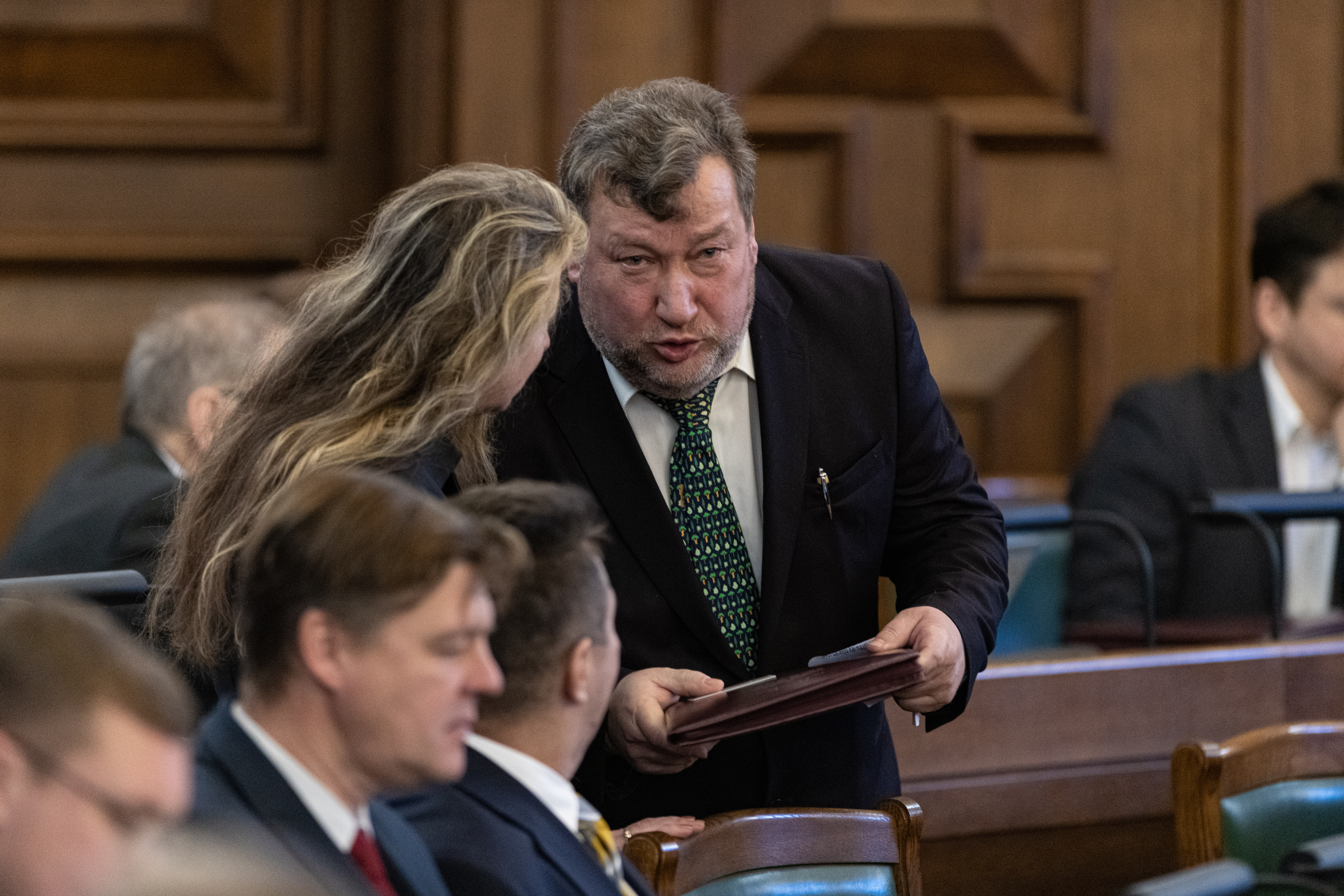

Member of the 14th Saeima
- Incumbent
- Assumed office 15 December 2022
- President: Egils Levits; Edgars Rinkēvičs
- Premier: Krišjānis Kariņš; Evika Siliņa

Director General of the Nature Conservation Agency
- In office 1 November 2019 – 15 January 2023
- Preceded by: Jānis Jātnieks

Director of the National Botanic Garden
- In office 2006 – 1 November 2019
- Preceded by: Ģederts Ieviņš
- Succeeded by: Artis Vītiņš

Personal details
- Born: 15 June 1968 (age 58)
- Party: Latvian Green Party
- Education: University of Latvia
- Occupation: Politician, dendrologist

Andrejs Svilāns (born 15 June 1968) is a Latvian biologist specialising in dendrology and a politician. He has also worked as a radio journalist. Currently a member of the 14th Saeima, he has been a member of the Salaspils Municipal Council for several terms. He is known as the long-time head of the National Botanical Garden and Director General of the Nature Conservation Agency.

== Biography ==
Born in Lielajos Strodos, Varakļānai Parish, he received his secondary education (1986) at Varakļāni secondary school. He started his studies at the Faculty of Biology of the University of Latvia, which were interrupted by his service in Afghanistan (1987–1989). In an interview, he said that he lied to his parents to save them from stress by telling them he was in Mongolia, not Afghanistan. He graduated from the University of Latvia in 1993 with a degree in plant physiology. He completed his PhD studies at Daugavpils University in the field of natural sciences. He has further studies at the Humboldt University in Berlin and the University of Bonn.

During his studies (since 1991) he started working at the National Botanical Garden (NBD): first in the Dendroflora Department and later as a curator of the NBD collections and exhibitions. In 2006 he became the Director of the NBD. In 2019 he was selected as the Director General of the Nature Conservation Agency, but in parallel he continued working at the NBD as a curator of collections, acting head of the Dendroflora Department.

In addition to his botanical work, he worked as a journalist for Radio Free Europe.

=== Political career ===
Svilāns successfully ran in the 2009 municipal elections on the joint list of the Union of Greens and Farmers and the LSDP, and in the 2013 and 2017 municipal elections to the Salaspils Regional Council on the list of the Union of Greens and Farmers.

In the 2021 elections, he was also elected to the regional council from the list of the Latvian Green Party.

In the autumn of 2022, A. Svilāns ran for the 14th Saeima elections on the United list. Although he was not initially elected to the 14th Saeima, on 15 December he became a Member of the Parliament after Māris Sprindžukas resigned as a minister.
