= Antoņina Ņenaševa =

Latvian politician and educator

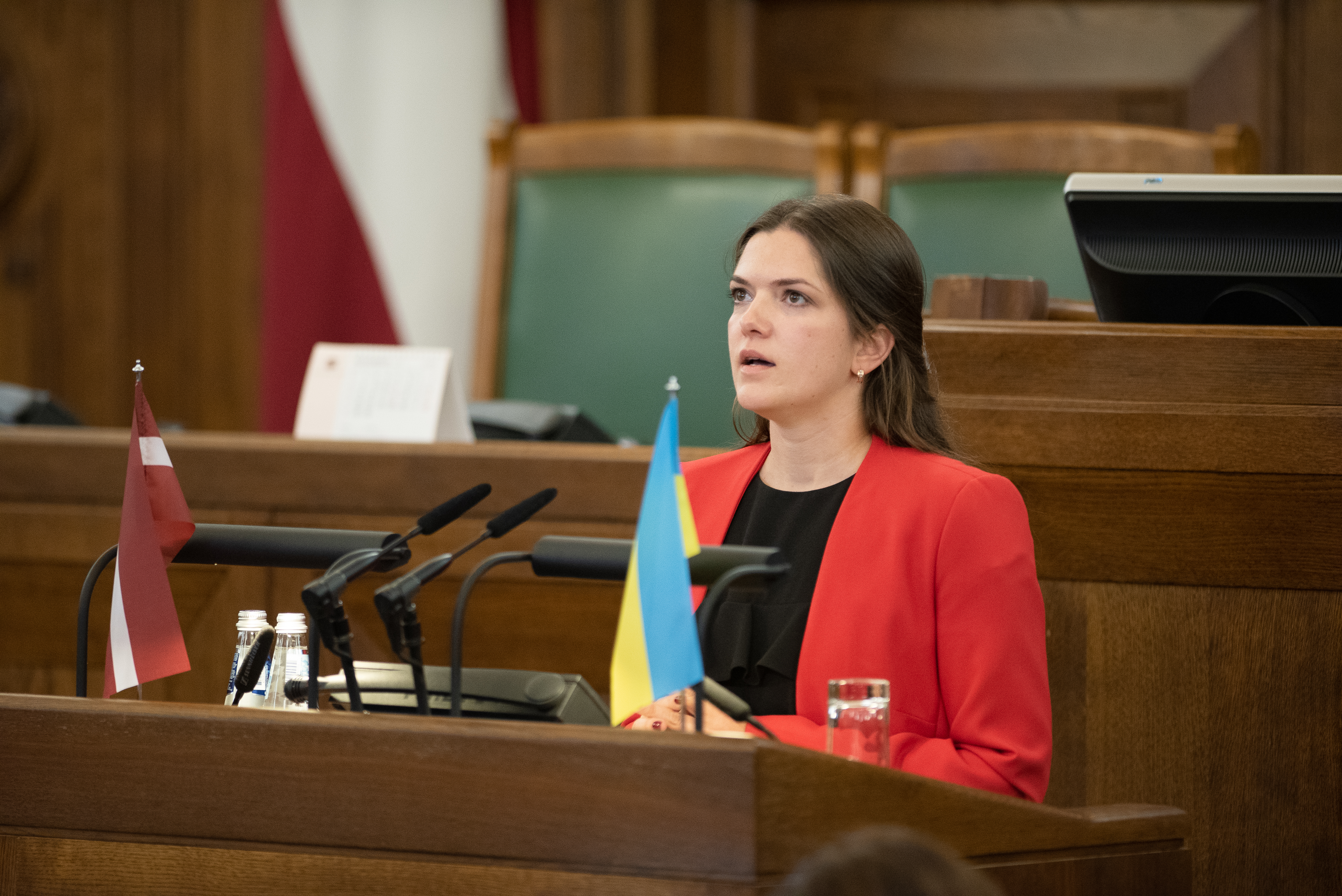

Member of the 14th Saeima
- Incumbent
- Assumed office 1 November 2022
- President: Egils Levits; Edgars Rinkēvičs
- Premier: Krišjānis Kariņš; Evika Siliņa

Co-President of The Progressives
- In office 14 September 2019 – 29 April 2023
- Preceded by: Roberts Putnis
- Succeeded by: Andris Šuvajevs, Justīne Panteļējeva

Member of Riga City Council
- In office 2 October 2020 – 1 November 2022

Personal details
- Born: June 17, 1988 (age 38)
- Party: The Progressives
- Education: London School of Economics; Baltic International Academy
- Occupation: Teacher, lecturer, politician

Antonina Nenaševa (born 17 July 1988) is a Latvian politician, educator. Currently a member of the 14th Saeima (Parliament), she serves on the Education, Culture and Science Commission and is a member of the Saeima Presidium. Member of the Board and founder of the Progressive Party.

A. Nenaševa has been a member of the Riga City Council, Co-chair of The Progressive, a teacher of social sciences and economics and a lecturer of political science at Riga Stradiņš University.

== Biography ==
She attended Riga Zolitudes Gymnasium, graduated from the Baltic International Academy with a BA in Political science in 2011, and obtained an MA in Social Policy from the London School of Economics and Political Science in 2015.

In 2018, she joined the Mission Possible education program, becoming a social studies and economics teacher at Riga Secondary School No. 22.

In 2021, she received the Gender equality Award from the Latvian Network of Women's NGOs for raising public awareness on gender equality issues.

=== Political career ===
In the 9th and 10th Saeimas, A. Nenasheva worked as an assistant to Alexei Kholostov, a deputy of the Harmony Centre, but was not a member of the Harmony Party.

She held the positions of Secretary General and chairwoman of the board of directors in the youth organization of the party "Harmony", a socio-political youth non-governmental organization.

In the 2018 parliamentary elections, she ran unsuccessfully as the number one candidate in the Riga constituency. She was also not elected in the 2019 European Parliament elections, where she ran as the number three candidate in the party list. On 14 September 2019, together with Edmundus Cepurītis, she was elected co-chair of the Progressives party.

In the 2020 extraordinary elections to the Riga City Council, Nenaševa was elected to the Riga City Council on the Development/For! and the joint list of the Progressives alliance. In the autumn 2022 parliamentary elections, A. Nenaseva was elected as a Member of the 14th Saeima. At the first sitting of the new Parliament, she was elected to the Presidium of the Saeima as a member of the Saeima Secretariat.
