= Ramona Petraviča =

Latvian politician

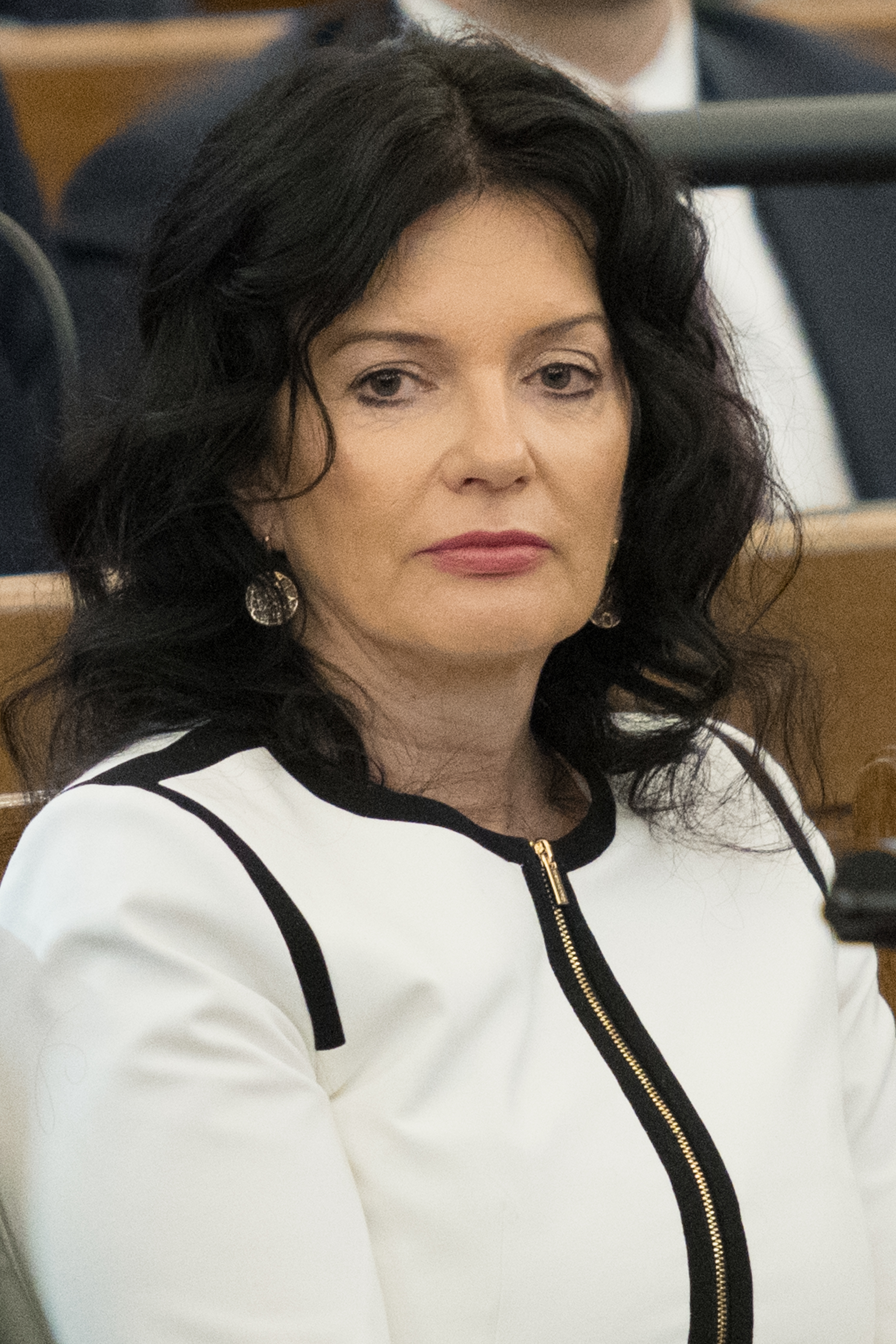
- Petraviča in 2019

Member of the Saeima
- Incumbent
- Assumed office November 6, 2018

Minister for Welfare
- In office January 23, 2019 – June 3, 2021
- Prime Minister: Krišjānis Kariņš
- Preceded by: Jānis Reirs
- Succeeded by: Gatis Eglītis

Personal details
- Born: 25 September 1967 (age 59) Auce, Latvian SSR, Soviet Union (now Latvia)
- Party: Latvia First (since 2022)
- Other political affiliations: For a Humane Latvia (2017-2022)
- Spouse: Aleksandrs Petravičs
- Education: Riga Technical University

Ramona Petraviča (born 25 September 1967 in Auce) is a Latvian politician and financier, who is a member of the Saeima and who between 23 January 2019 and 3 June 2021 served as Minister of Welfare in the Kariņš cabinet led by Prime Minister Krišjānis Kariņš.

== Biography ==
Petraviča graduated from Riga Technical University with a degree in chemical technology in 1992.

Before being elected to the Saeima in 2018, Petraviča was the finance director of the Saldus-based logistics company SIA Monēta and, since 2017, a member of the Saldus Municipality Council. She was elected in 2018 to the Saeima as an MP, and, after losing her ministerial portfolio, returned to parliament. In 2022 she quit the For a Humane Latvia party and later joined the Latvia First party of oligarch Ainārs Šlesers, being re-elected in the elections later that year.
