= Juris Jakovins =

Latvian politician and doctor

Member of the 14th Saeima
- Incumbent
- Assumed office 1 November 2022
- President: Egils Levits; Edgars Rinkēvičs
- Prime Minister: Krišjānis Kariņš; Evika Siliņa

Personal details
- Born: 12 January 1961 (age 65) Valmiera Municipality, Latvia
- Party: Latvian Way, Latvian Farmers' Union
- Education: Riga Stradiņš University
- Occupation: Politician, physician

Juris Jakovins (born 12 January 1961) is a Latvian doctor and politician. He is currently a member of the 14th Saeima, representing the Latvian Farmers' Union and the Union of Greens and Farmers. Previously, he was a member of the Valmiera City Council (2013–2021) and Valmiera Municipality (2021–2022).

== Biography ==
Born on 12 January 1961, he graduated from the Riga Medical Institute in 1986 and became a doctor.

Before being elected to the Saeima, Mr Jakovins worked as a family doctor in Valmiera and Ranceni parishes, as an occupational physician in SIA "Leilands un Putnis", and was a member of the Board of SIA "Kārvins". He committed to continue his practice as a family doctor after his election to the Saeima. According to the National Health Service, the number of patients in his practice in 2022 was 6147 adults and 718 children. For several years, Mr Jakovin's practice was by far the largest GP practice in Latvia in terms of the number of patients.

In 2014, he received the Annual Medical Award in the nomination "Doctor of the Year".

== Political career ==
In the 1997 municipal elections, Jakovins was elected to the Valmiera City Council from the party "Latvian Way". He also ran for the 2001 municipal elections from the same party, but was not elected, remaining first behind the line. He was also not elected in the 2005 municipal elections.

In the 2013 and 2017 municipal elections, he was elected to the Valmiera City Council on the list of the Union of Greens and Farmers, while after the administrative-territorial reform in the 2021 Latvian municipal elections, Jakovins was elected to the Valmiera Regional Council on the list of the Latvian Farmers' Union.

In the 2022 Saeima elections, Juris Jakovins was elected as a member of the 14th Saeima from the Union of Greens and Farmers.
