= Kristaps Krištopans =

Latvian politician and businessman

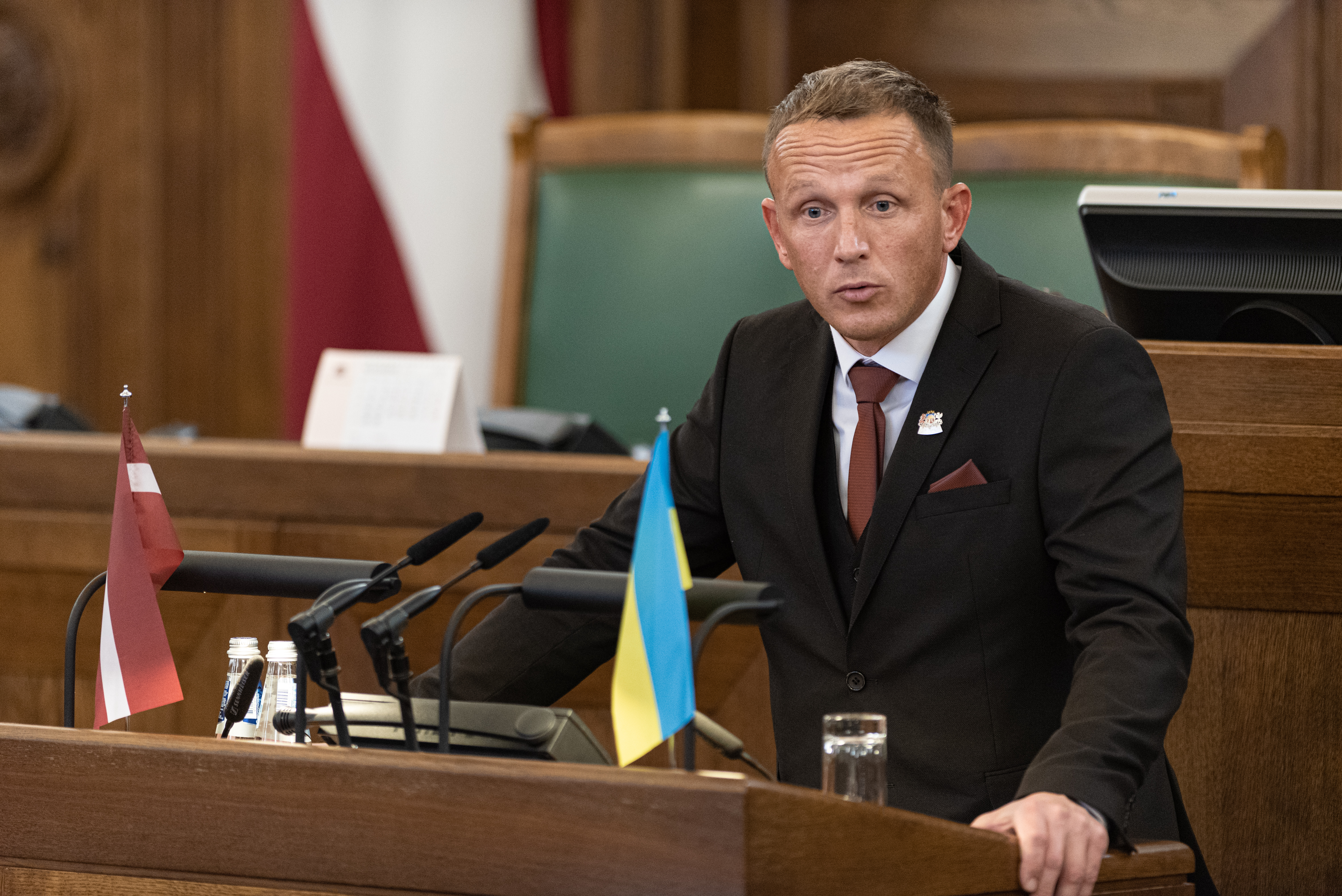

Member of the 14th Saeima
- Incumbent
- Assumed office 1 November 2022
- President: Egils Levits; Edgars Rinkēvičs
- Premier: Krišjānis Kariņš; Evika Siliņa

Personal details
- Born: 27 March 1983 (age 43)
- Party: Latvia First
- Education: Florida Atlantic University; Miami University

Kristaps Krištopans (born 27 March 1983) is a Latvian businessman and politician. He was elected to the 14th Saeima on the list of the Latvia First Party.

== Biography ==
Krištopans is the son of Latvian basketball player, businessman and politician Vils Krištopans. He trained in basketball and played in the LJBL, and later in amateur tournaments. He received his higher education in the US, graduating from Florida Atlantic University (Bachelor of Business Administration, 2005) and Miami University (Master of Business Administration, 2008).

In 2021, he went bankrupt as a private individual, at that time his debts exceeded EUR 1.2 million. Before his election to the Parliament, he reported debts of more than EUR 900 000.

K. Krištopans is married to Kristine Lepnāne, but his previous marriage to Santa Šmiti has been dissolved. A son was born in each marriage.

In the elections to the 14th Saeima in autumn 2022, K. Krištopans was elected to the 14th Saeima on the list of the Latvia First party, as was his father V. Krištopans.
