= Zanda =

Zanda may refer to:

- Zanda (bird), a genus of three species of black cockatoo
- Zanda County, county in Tibet
- Zanda, Tibet, seat of Zanda County
- Zanda (given name)
- Princess Zanda, a fictional Marvel Comics character
- "Zanda", a song by Russian composer Arkady Mandjiev
- "Countess Zanda", character from the movie Sheena (film)
