= Maksims Mališko =

Latvian economist and finance entrepreneur

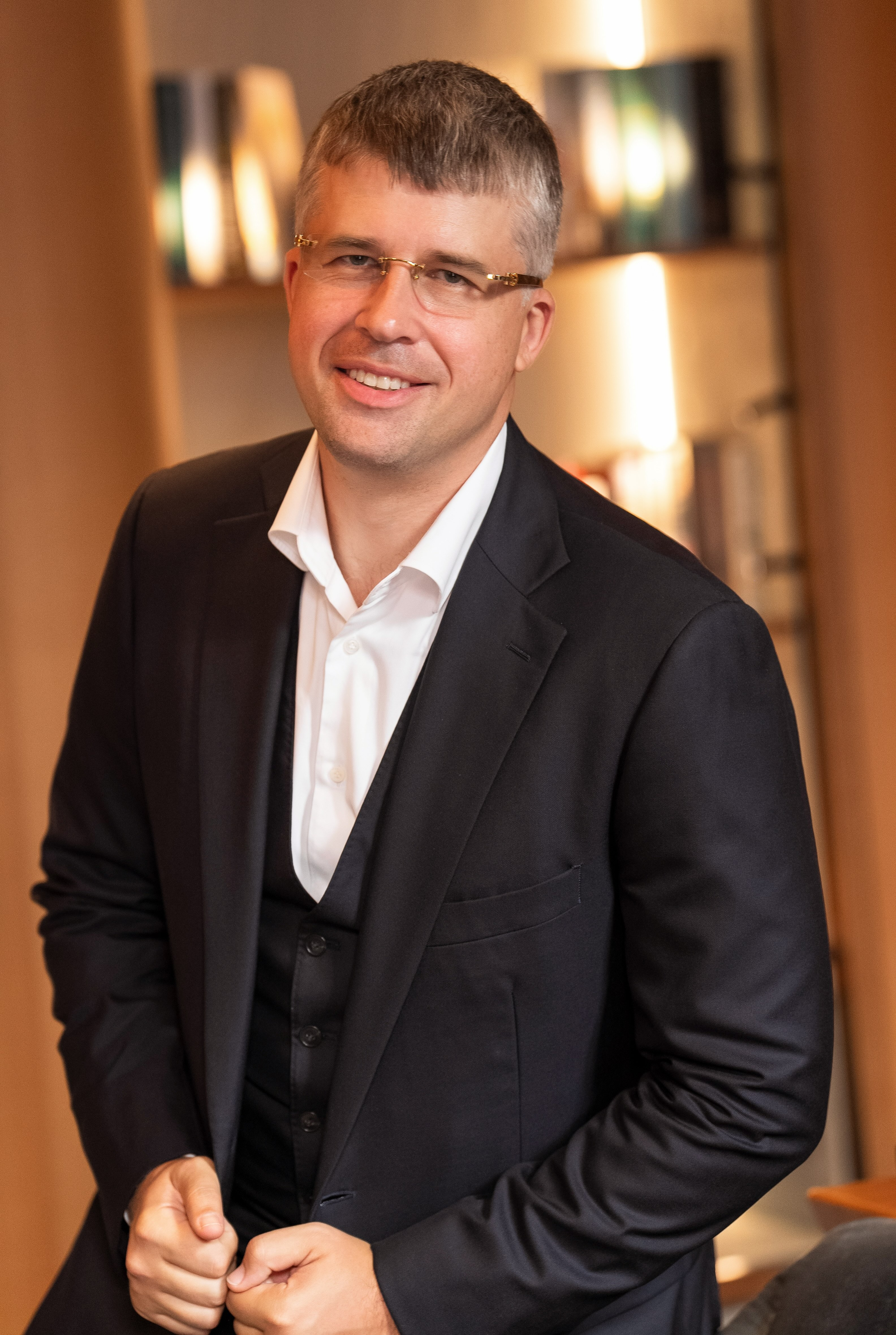
- Born: December 9, 1981 (age 44); Riga, Latvia
- Education: Baltic International Academy (PhD in Economics)
- Occupations: Entrepreneur, finance industry investor, founder of Grand Credit AS
- Awards: Forbes Latvia “40 under 40” (2021)

Maksims Mališko (December 9, 1981) is a Latvian economist and finance entrepreneur. Mališko is also a naturalist and explorer, as well as the author of several books for children and teenagers about nature.

== Early life and education ==
Maksims Mališko was born in Riga on December 9, 1981. His parents are Vladimir Mališko, a banker, and Olga Mališko, a distinguished employee of the Central Administration of the Riga City Municipality, where she worked for over 20 years. His family roots trace back to the Ludza District and the Abrene area.

Mališko earned BA degree in Business Management from the Baltic International Academy in 2004 and completed his MA degree in 2006. In 2012, he earned a PhD in Economics from the Baltic International Academy.

== Career ==
Mališko began his career in the financial industry in the 2000s. As of 2025, he has an investment portfolio of more than 50 companies operating in fintech, mortgage, business-to-business lending, and real estate development. The companies range from start-ups to mature, fully scaled enterprises.

In 2007, Maksims Mališko established Grand Credit, a company in the financial sector, which operates in the non-banking lending market. It has issued more than EUR 88 million in loans over the course of its operations. It has also issued bonds totaling EUR 28 million, which are traded on Nasdaq Riga Stock Exchange.

Mališko also has a significant interest in the consumer leasing company Nord Lizings.

Mališko is active in real estate, primarily through his company Rīgas īpašumu fonds, which has developed a significant commercial real estate portfolio in Latvia and Estonia. He is also involved in the development of a major multi-functional real estate project, Fabrika, in Riga, Latvia. This project aims to revitalize the former Riga Dairy Company (Latvian: Rīgas piena kombināts) industrial site, repurposing its buildings and public areas. Located on Valmieras Street in central Riga, the project is currently in the development stage. It envisions transforming more than 20,000 square meters into retail, office, sports, public, and industrial spaces.

== Nature exploration ==
Maksims Mališko is also a naturalist. He has participated in expeditions, including to both the South and North Poles. He is also taking part in the Seven Summits Program with the goal of climbing the highest peaks on each continent. As part of international scientific teams, he has visited more than 18 polar stations, including Svalbard in the Arctic Ocean and research bases in central Antarctica. He also participated in projects monitoring biodiversity and climate change processes, supervised by the European Polar Consortium and several university research centers. Mališko also took part in an expedition organized under the SCAR (Scientific Committee on Antarctic Research) program. He participated in a pilot WWF Arctic program aimed at supporting volunteer initiatives in protected natural areas of Northern Norway. As part of his nature exploration and conservation efforts, Mališko is also a writer. He has authored several educational books about nature for children and teenagers. His work focuses on polar regions.

== Charitable work ==
Mališko has been involved in charitable work and sponsorships in children’s and youth education and various sports. His key focus has been on weightlifting, as well as Kickboxing and Boxing School in Riga, Dobeles Atlēts Sports Club, the Latvian Automobile Federation, and the Super Nova Sports Club, among others.

== Bibliography ==
- Malisko, Maksims. What Is Going On At The End Of The World?: Polar Adventures: A Vibrant Exploration Of Arctic Animals And Oceanic Wonders For Kids. Independently published, June 20, 2023. ISBN 979-8398926378.
- Malisko, Maksims. On Drifting Ice: An Explorer's Tales from Antarctica and the Arctic. June 12, 2024. ASIN B0D6YVTRG4
