= Andris Bērziņš =

Andris Bērziņš may refer to:

- Andris Bērziņš (Latvian President) (born 1944), former President of Latvia (2011–2015)
- Andris Bērziņš (Latvian Prime Minister) (born 1951), former Prime Minister of Latvia (2000–02)
- Andris Bērziņš (politician, 1955), Latvian philologist, public servant, and politician
