= We Change the Rules =

Latvian political party

We Change the Rules Mēs mainām noteikumus
- Abbreviation: MMN
- Leader: Alvis Hermanis
- Founder: Vjačeslavs Dombrovskis, Sandis Ģirģens
- Founded: 28 August 2021
- Split from: Harmony; KPV LV
- Membership (2026): 517
- Ideology: Anti-immigration
- Political position: Right-wing; Historical: Centrism
- Colours: Black (since 2026)
- Saeima: 0 / 100
- European Parliament: 0 / 9

Website
- mmn.lv

We Change the Rules (Latvian: Mēs mainām noteikumus), previously known as Republic (Latvian: Republika), is a right-wing political party in Latvia.

The party was formed in August 2021 and was represented in the 13th Saeima by four deputies who had originally been elected in the 2018 Latvian parliamentary election on the lists of the Social Democratic Party "Harmony" (Vjačeslavs Dombrovskis and Evija Papule) and Who Owns the State? (Kaspars Ģirģens and Ēriks Pucens). In 2026, the party became associated with theatre director Alvis Hermanis and was renamed to "We Change the Rules". Hermanis and his associates proposed replacing proportional representation with a majoritarian electoral system based on single-member constituencies.

== Election results ==
=== Legislative elections ===
Election	Party leader	Performance					Rank	Government
Election	Party leader	Votes	%	± pp	Seats	+/–	Rank	Government
2022	Sandis Ģirģens	16,088	1.78	New	0 / 100	New	14th	Extra-parliamentary
2026	Alvis Hermanis	27,579	3.47	▲1.71	0 / 100	0	▲8th	Extra-parliamentary
