= Andris Bērziņš (politician, 1955) =

Latvian politician

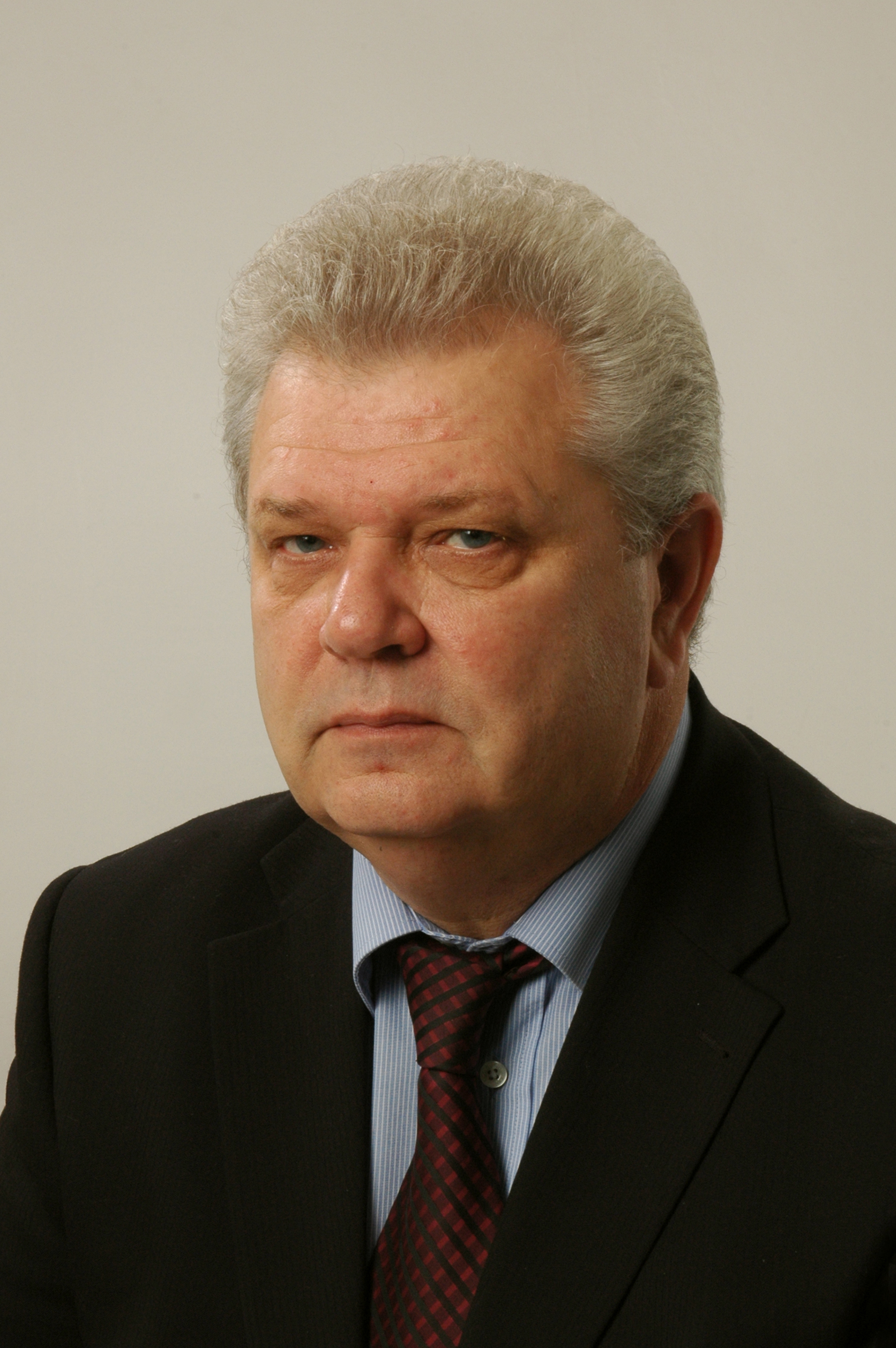
- Andris Bērziņš in 2014

Member of the 14th Saeima
- Incumbent
- Assumed office November 1, 2022

Member of the 12th Saeima
- In office November 4, 2014 – November 6, 2018
- President: Raimonds Vējonis
- Prime Minister: Māris Kučinskis

Member of the 11th Saeima
- In office October 17, 2011 – November 4, 2014
- President: Andris Bērziņš
- Prime Minister: Laimdota Straujuma

Member of the 10th Saeima
- In office November 2, 2010 – October 16, 2011
- President: Valdis Zatlers
- Prime Minister: Valdis Dombrovskis

Member of the 9th Saeima
- In office November 7, 2006 – November 2, 2010
- President: Valdis Zatlers
- Prime Minister: Aigars Kalvītis, Ivars Godmanis, Valdis Dombrovskis

Member of the 8th Saeima
- In office November 5, 2002 – November 7, 2006
- President: Vaira Vīķe-Freiberga, Valdis Zatlers
- Prime Minister: Einars Repše, Indulis Emsis, Aigars Kalvītis

Member of the 7th Saeima
- In office November 3, 1998 – November 5, 2002
- President: Vaira Vīķe-Freiberga, Guntis Ulmanis
- Prime Minister: Guntars Krasts, Vilis Krištopans, Andris Šķēle, Andris Bērziņš

Personal details
- Born: November 26, 1955 (age 70) USSR, Latvian SSR, Riga, Latvia
- Party: CPSU, Latvian Way (1994–1997), New Party (1997–2002), LFU (2002–present)
- Education: University of Latvia
- Occupation: Philologist

Andris Bērziņš (born November 26, 1955) is a Latvian philologist, public servant, and politician. He has served as a member of seven convocations of the Saeima, elected to the 14th Saeima. He represents the Latvian Farmers' Union and the Union of Greens and Farmers. Previously, he was involved with the New Party and Latvian Way, as well as the Latvian Farmers' Union. Since 1989, he has been the head of the Latvian Children's Fund.

== Biography ==
In 1974, Andris Bērziņš graduated from Rīgas French Lycée. In 1979, he completed his studies in French language and literature at the University of Latvia. He obtained qualifications as a philologist, teacher, and translator. He worked in the Komsomol.

== Political career ==
He was a member of the Communist Party of the Soviet Union. In Latvian politics, he became involved with the Latvian Way party and served as a member of the Riga City Council in two of its convocations (elected in 1994 and 1997). He later became involved with the New Party, from which he was elected to the 7th Saeima in 1998. He worked in the European Affairs Committee and the Social and Employment Affairs Committee. After the dissolution of the New Party's parliamentary faction in 2002, he became an independent deputy. He was included as a non-partisan candidate in the Union of Greens and Farmers' election list for the 8th Saeima elections, and was elected to the 8th Saeima. He later joined the Latvian Farmers' Union. As a deputy, he was a member of the Public Expenditure and Audit Committee and chaired the Social and Employment Affairs Committee. He led the Latvian delegation to the Parliamentary Assembly of the Council of Europe.

In 2004, he ran in the European Parliament elections from the Union of Greens and Farmers' list, but was not elected (the same happened in the 2009 European Parliament elections). In 2006, he was elected to the 9th Saeima, where he was chairman of the Public Expenditure and Audit Committee, secretary of the Social and Employment Affairs Committee, and leader of the Latvian delegation to the Parliamentary Assembly of the Council of Europe. In 2010, he was elected vice president of the Parliamentary Assembly of the Council of Europe.

In October 2010, he was elected to the 10th Saeima from the Union of Greens and Farmers' list. In the extraordinary elections of the 11th Saeima in 2011, he was also elected to the 11th Saeima. In the 2014 European Parliament elections, he ran on the Union of Greens and Farmers' list. In the same year, he was elected to the 12th Saeima. He also ran in the 2018 parliamentary elections, but did not receive sufficient voter support. In 2022, he was elected to the 14th Saeima, becoming its seventh convocation, where he served.

== Personal life ==
Andris Bērziņš is married and has a daughter.
