= Zanda (given name) =

Female given name

- Gender: Female
- Name day: 1 October

Origin
- Region of origin: Latvia

Zanda is a Latvian feminine given name. The associated name day is 1 October.

== Notable people named Zanda ==
- Zanda Bikše (born 1970), Latvian curler
- Zanda Kalniņa-Lukaševica (born 1978), Latvian politician
- Zanda Zakuza (born 1993), South African singer and songwriter
