= Edmunds Cepurītis =

Latvian politician

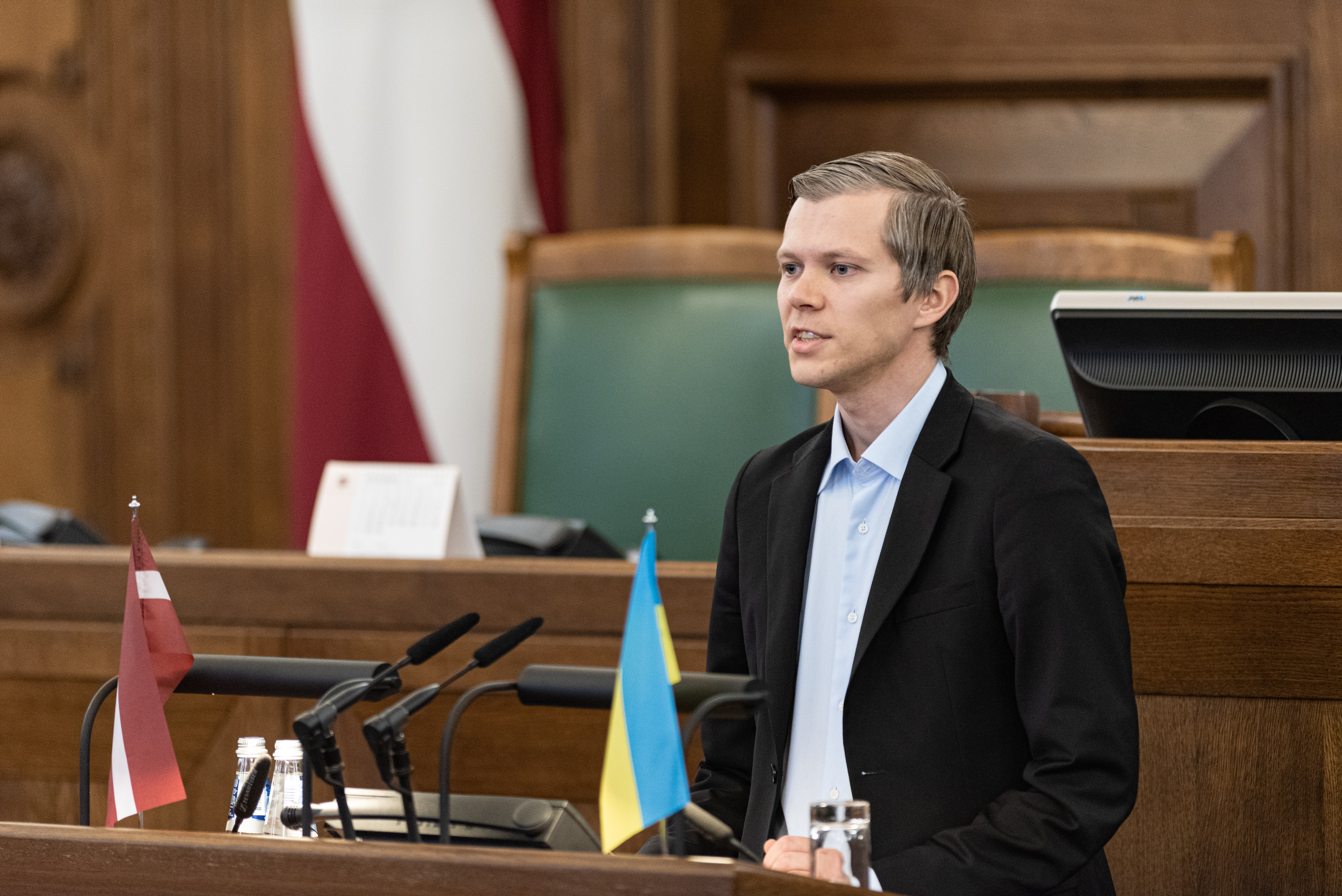

Member of the 14th Saeima
- Incumbent
- Assumed office 1 November 2022
- President: Egils Levits; Edgars Rinkēvičs
- Premier: Krišjānis Kariņš; Evika Siliņa

Member of the Riga City Council
- In office 2 October 2020 – 1 November 2022
- Premier: Krišjānis Kariņš

Co-Chairman of The Progressives
- In office 14 September 2019 – 4 September 202

Personal details
- Born: July 19, 1991 (age 34)
- Party: The Progressives
- Education: University of Latvia
- Occupation: Politician

Edmunds Cepurītis (born 19 July 1991) is a Latvian politician and environmentalist. He is currently a member of the 14th Saeima, representing the Progressive Party. Previously, he was a member of the Riga City Council.

== Biography ==
E. Cepurītis graduated as an environmental scientist from the Faculty of Geography and Earth Sciences of the University of Latvia, obtaining a bachelor's degree in 2013 and a master's degree in 2016.

E. Cepurītis' professional activity is related to environmental protection and the non-governmental sector – he is a project manager at the foundation "Environmental Education Fund", as well as a board member of the association "Zero Waste Latvija", which advocates for the reduction of waste pollution. He is a member of the debate association "Quo Tu domā?"

=== Political career ===
In the 2018 elections to the 13th Saeima, E. Cepurītis ran as number 6 on the Progressives' list in the Riga constituency, but the list did not pass the 5% barrier.

From 14 September 2019 until 4 September 2021, Mr Cepurītis was one of the co-chairs of the Progressive Party together with Antonina Nenaseva.

In the 2019 European elections, he was number 4 on the Progressives' list, but was not elected. His political priorities are responsible climate and environmental policies and the introduction of a fair tax system. In the European election campaign, he stressed the need to move to a new energy system "to tackle the climate crisis and reduce European countries' dependence on Russia", as well as the need to tackle socio-economic inequalities.

In the 2020 extraordinary Riga City Council elections, E. Cepurīte was elected as a Riga City Council deputy from the "Progressives" and "Development/For!" joint list. He chaired the Housing and Environment Committee of the Riga City Council.

In the autumn of 2022, he was elected to the 14th Saeima, where he serves on the Social and Labour Affairs and European Affairs Committees.
