= Ivars Zariņš =

Latvian politician

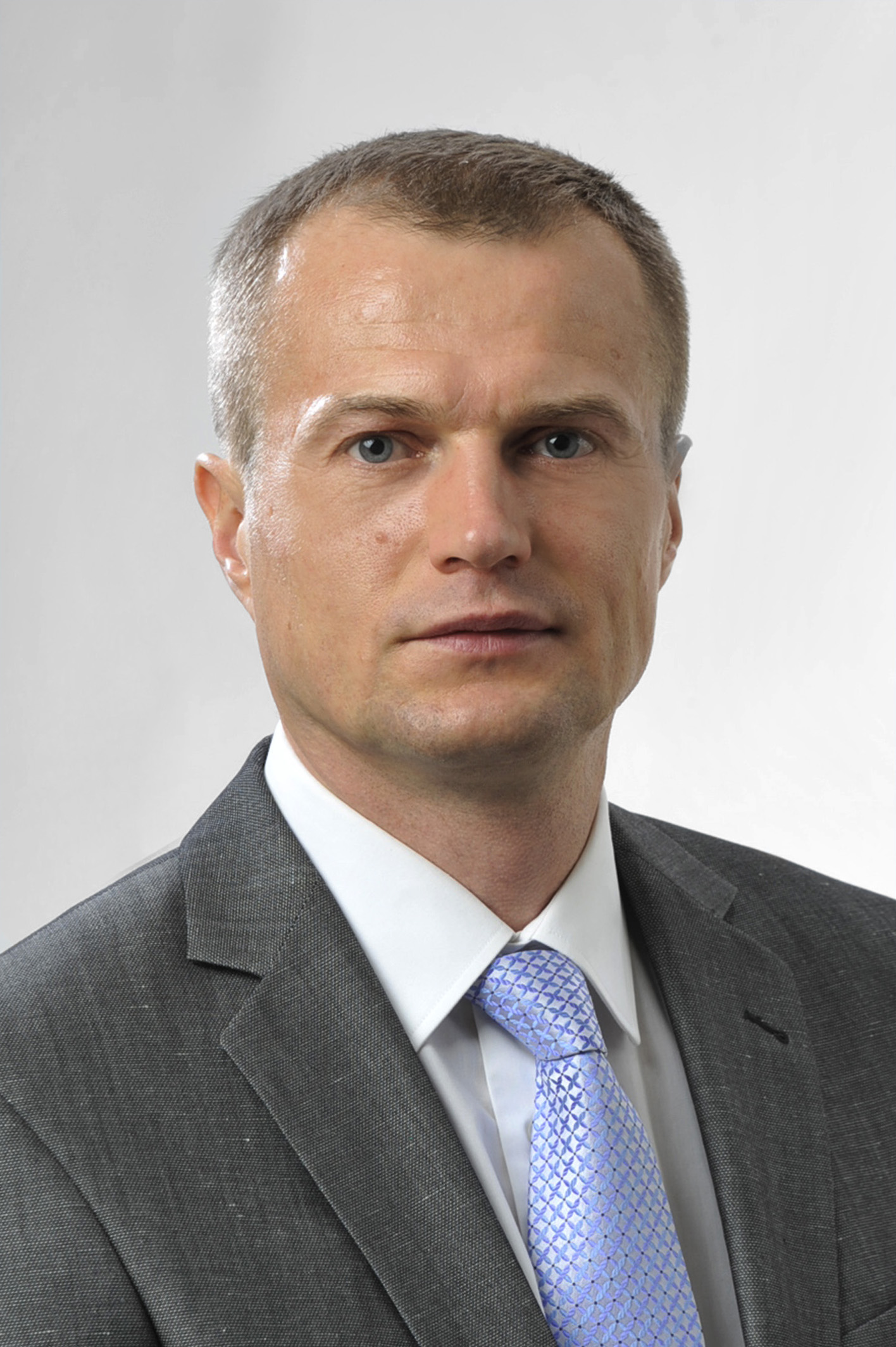

Deputy of the Saeima
- In office 17 October 2011 – 3 March 2022

Personal details
- Born: 18 April 1969 (age 57) Jēkabpils, Latvian SSR
- Party: Harmony
- Education: University of Latvia
- Profession: economist

Ivars Zariņš (born 1969) is a Latvian politician. He is a member of Harmony and a deputy of the 12th Saeima.
