= Riga French Lycée =

School in Riga, Latvia

- Rīgas Franču licejs
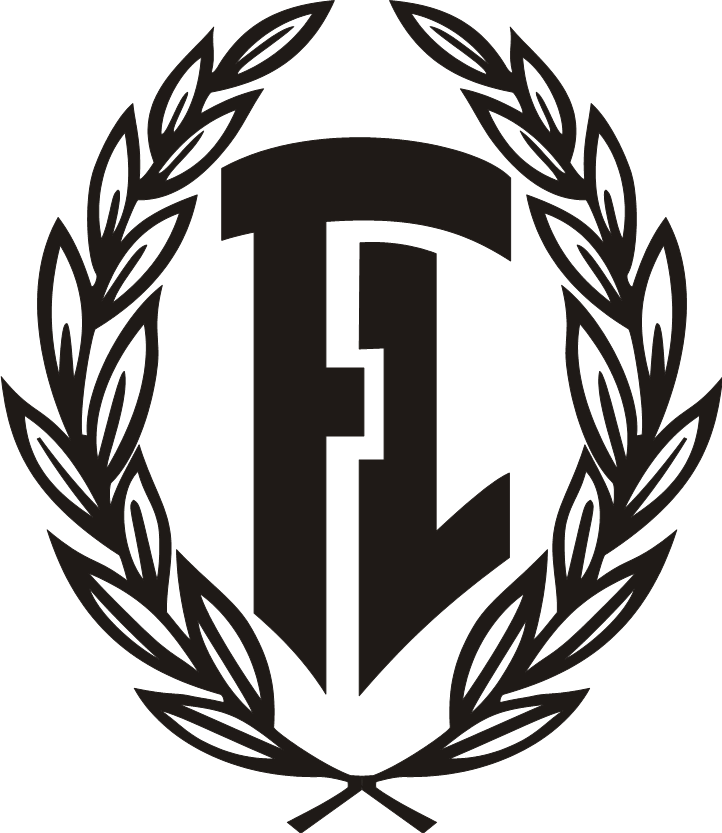
- Riga French Lyceum seal

Location
- Mēness iela 8, Krišjāņa Valdemāra iela 48; Riga, LV-1013; Latvia; 56°58′0.24″N 24°8′14.71″E

Information
- Type: Public
- Motto: Liberté, égalité, fraternité (Freedom, equality, brotherhood)
- Opened: September 1921
- Principal: Vineta Rūtenberga
- Grades: 1 to 12
- Age: 7 to 19
- Language: Latvian, French
- Colors: Royal blue, white, and red
- Website: www.rfl.lv/english

The Riga French Lycée (Latvian: Rīgas Franču licejs, French: Lycée Français de Riga) is a French international school that was founded in September 1921 in Riga, Latvia. It is a school, where studies take place from grade 1 to 12 and the only school in Latvia, where French can be learned at an advanced level starting from primary school. Studies from years 1-6 take place at 8 Mēness street and years 7–12 at 48 Krisijana Valdemara street.

== History ==
Marcel Etienne Segrest (Marsels Etjēns Segrests), the former Director of the Lycée Marsels, was one of the first teachers at the school. In addition to teaching French he also taught the Latvian language and literature. He was joined by Angelika Gailīte, a history teacher. It was located at 48 Krisjana Valdemara street.

In 1965 the school was renamed as the Henri Barbusse Riga Secondary school No. 11and moved to 8 Mēness Street, Riga. On 21 September 1991 the original name, Riga French Lycée, was restored and later on 3 September 2018 the lycée also returned to the original building on 48 Krisijana Valdemara street. Odile Suopison, the Ambassador of France, honoured the opening event with her presence. The Ambassador recalled the history of the Lycée and reminded: „In 2016 Riga French Lycée became a LabelFrancEducation school, thus having become a part of a global French movement within the framework of the International Organization of La Francophonie. And Latvia has been a member state of this organization with observer status for 10 years already. All countries, educational establishments and all those who contribute to the existence of Francophonie have not only French in common, but also such fundamental values as cultural diversity, peace, strengthening the rule of the law and democracy." At 48 K.Valdemāra Street the total area of 5355 square meters of the historical building has been renovated. There are 31 classrooms, a cloakroom for 600 students, a canteen with 274 places, an assembly hall with 209 seats, a conference hall and separate premises for sport lessons and for the administration of the school. The renovation of Riga French Lycée has been co-financed by European Regional Development Fund (ERDF). The building has been renovated by general partnership „RERE Būve 1" by the order of the Riga City Council's Property Department.

== See also ==
- List of French International Schools
- Tallinn French Lyceum
