= Atis Deksnis =

Latvian politician (1973–2023)

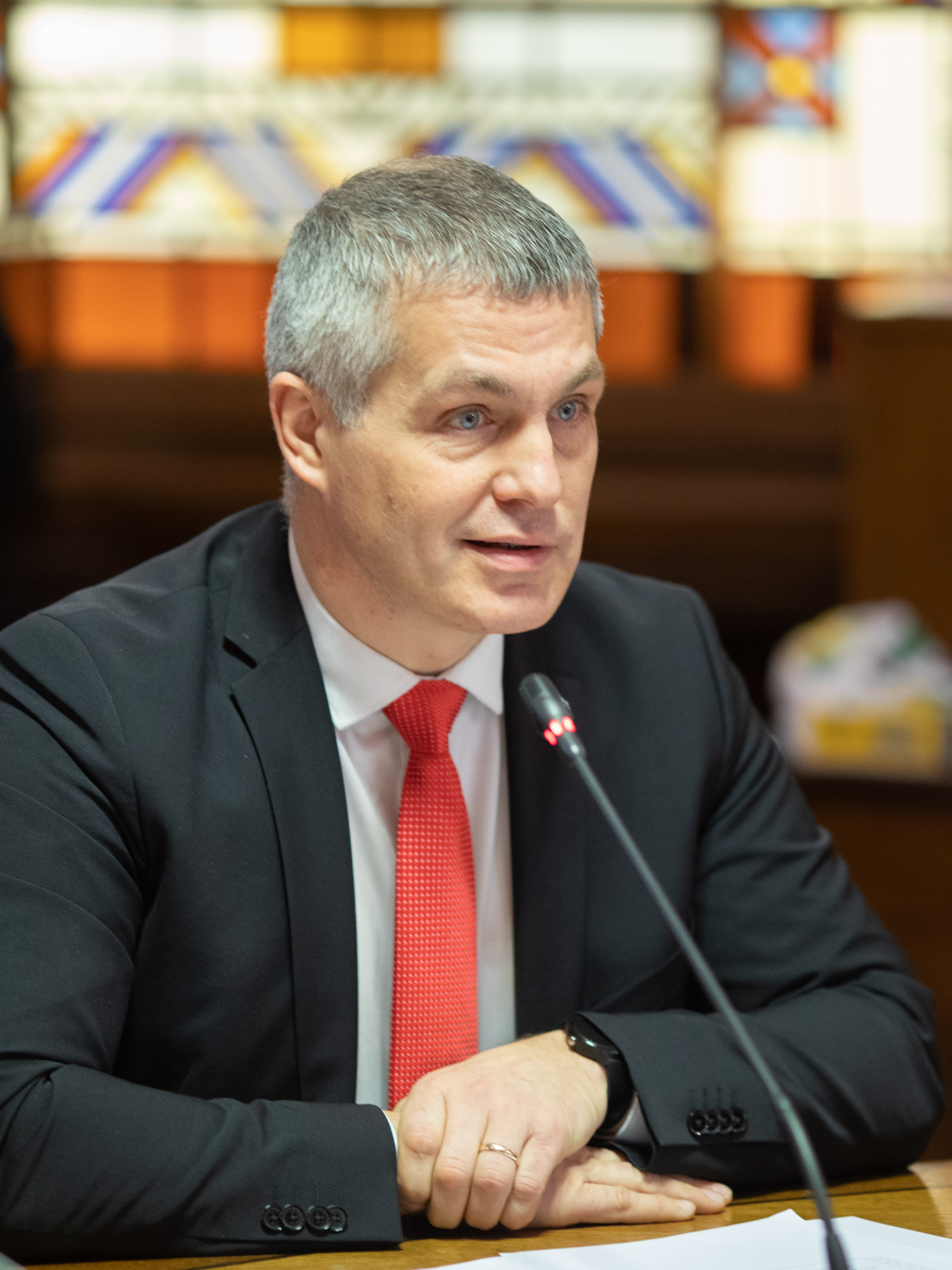
- Deksnis in 2022

Member of the Saeima
- In office 1 November 2022 – 25 September 2023

Personal details
- Born: 16 February 1973 Liepāja, Latvian SSR, USSR
- Died: 25 September 2023 (aged 50)
- Party: LRA
- Education: University of Liepāja

Atis Deksnis (16 February 1973 – 25 September 2023) was a Latvian politician, represented Latvian Association of Regions. He has been a Member of the 14. Saeima (elected from "United List"), Member of Liepāja City Council (2012–2022) and Deputy Chairman of the Council (2017–2022).

== Early life ==
Born on February 16, 1973, in Liepāja. Studied at Liepāja 1st high school,.

Worked in the Liepāja City Police Department and in the personnel department of JSC "Latvenergo" branch. At the same time, he studied at the Liepāja Pedagogical Academy, in 2005 he obtained professional higher education under the management of institutions and a company and started working as the head of the personnel department of JSC "Liepājas metalurgs". He was also a member of the council of SIA "Liepājas busu parks", the manager of the hockey team of the amateur sports club "LSK" and the head of the baptists Pāvilas parish in Liepāja.

== Political Actions ==
2009 in local government elections A. Deksnis unsuccessfully ran for a seat in Liepāja city council from the list of the LPP/LC party. 2013 In the municipal elections of 2011, he was already elected as a member of the Liepāja City Council from the Reformu party list.

2017 In the local government elections of 2011, he was elected to the Liepāja city council from the Latvijas Reģionu apiviņas, and was also elected as the deputy chairman of the city council. This position was also retained after 2021. municipal elections, when he was also elected to the city council.

At the 2022 Saeima elections Deksni was elected as 14. Saeima's deputies from the "United List", which included the Latvian Association of Regions.

== Death ==
Deksnis died on 25 September 2023, at the age of 50.
