= Dāvis Mārtiņš Daugavietis =

Latvian politician (born 1996)

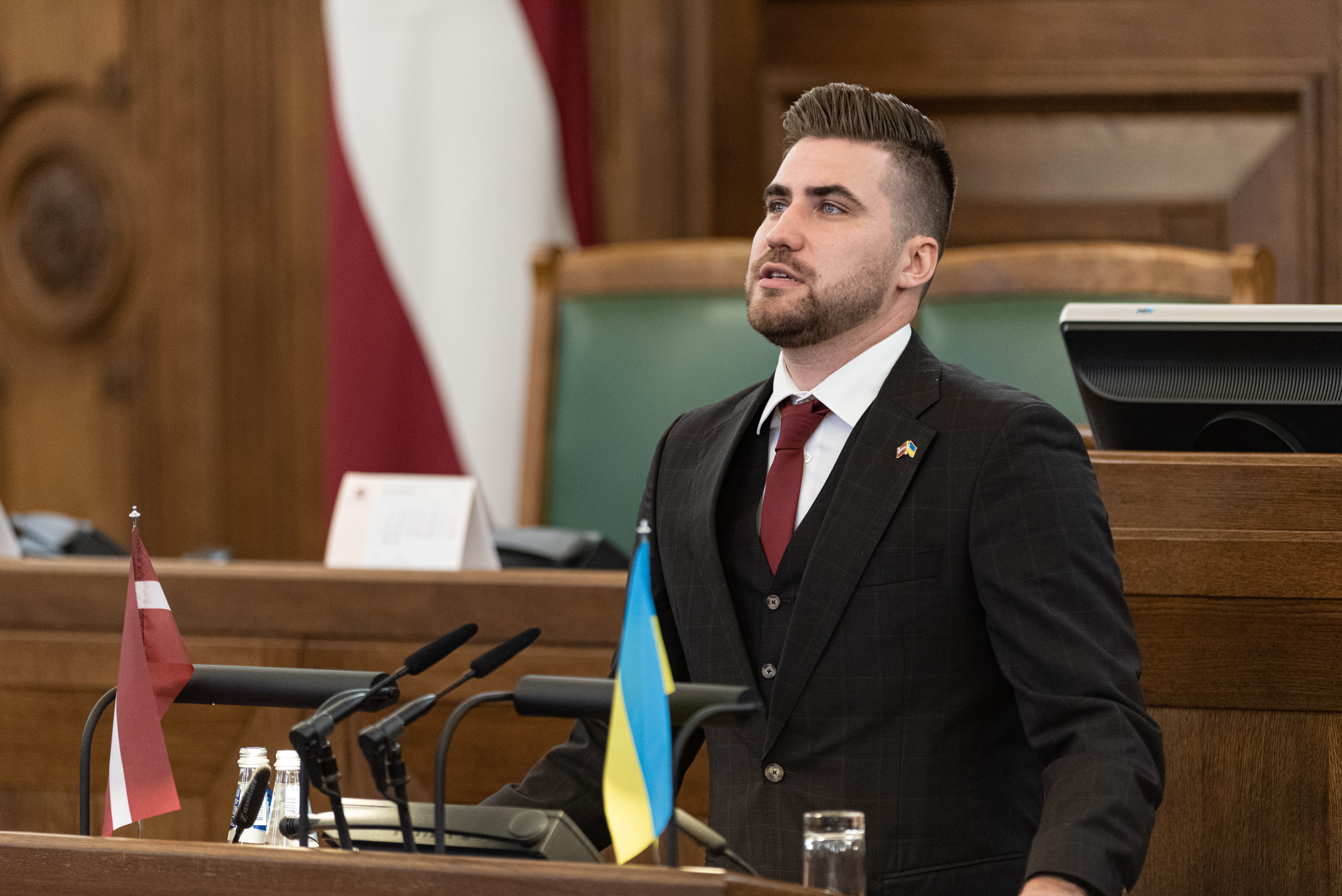
- Daugavietis in 2022

Member of the Saeima
- Incumbent
- Assumed office 1 November 2022
- Constituency: Livonia

Personal details
- Born: 22 August 1996 (age 29)
- Party: Unity

Dāvis Mārtiņš Daugavietis (born 22 August 1996) is a Latvian politician of Unity who was elected member of the Saeima in 2022. Since 2022, he has chaired the sports committee.
