= Armands Krauze =

Latvian politician (born 1970)

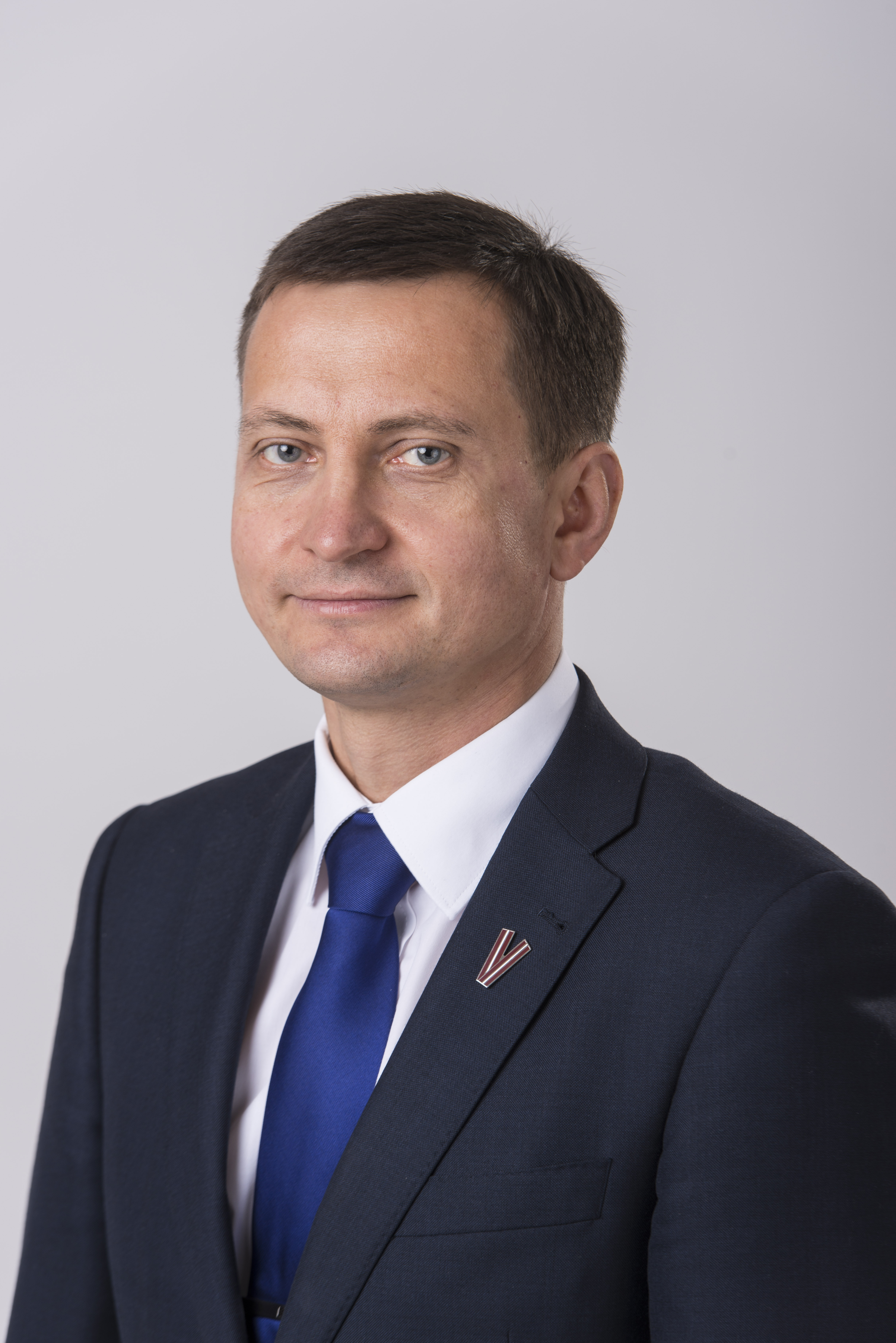
- Krauze in 2014

Minister of Agriculture
- In office 15 September 2023 – 14 May 2026
- Prime Minister: Evika Siliņa
- Preceded by: Didzis Šmits
- Succeeded by: Uldis Augulis

Personal details
- Born: 10 June 1970 (age 56)
- Party: Latvian Farmers' Union

Armands Krauze (born 10 June 1970) is a Latvian politician serving as minister of agriculture from 2023 until May 2026. From 2014 to 2023 and 2026, he was member of the Saeima.
