= Andris Šuvajevs =

Latvian politician (born 1991)

- Andris Šuvajevs in 2025

Member of the Saeima
- Incumbent
- Assumed office November 1, 2022

Deputy Chairman of Progressives
- Incumbent
- Assumed office April 29, 2023
- Preceded by: Atis Švinka

Personal details
- Born: June 18, 1991 (age 35)
- Party: Progressives
- Education: University of Glasgow; University of Oxford
- Profession: Economic anthropologist

Andris Šuvajevs (born June 18, 1991) is a Latvian economic anthropologist, researcher, and politician. He currently serves as a member of the 14th Saeima, representing the Progressives party. Since April 29, 2023, he has been the Deputy Chairman of the Progressives.

== Biography ==
He was born into the family of philosophers Igor and Andžela Šuvajeva. On his mother's side, he is the grandson of composer Imants Kalniņš.

He earned a bachelor's degree in social sciences in sociology (with distinction) from the University of Glasgow, as well as a master's degree in social anthropology from the University of Oxford.

As an economic anthropologist, he has researched the history of post-Soviet economies, state anthropology, and modern monetary theory. He has been a lecturer and researcher at Rīga Stradiņš University, a policy researcher at "Providus", and has also worked in financial journalism at the TVNET portal.

=== Political career ===
Running in the 14th Saeima elections on the Progressives party list, he prioritized the initiative "for the cancellation of unpayable debts to return citizens to the formal economy, boost demand levels, and enhance people's social protection. The first step is a comprehensive database on citizens' debts, repayment dynamics, and terms."

He was elected to the 14th Saeima from the Progressives list on October 1, 2022. On April 29, 2023, he was elected as the co-chairman of the Progressives (together with Riga City Council deputy Justīne Panteļējeva).

He serves on the Budget and Finance (Taxation) Committee of the 14th Saeima and has been its deputy chairman since September 27, 2023. Previously, he worked on the Public Expenditure and Audit Committee, and since the Progressives party entered the coalition, he has been serving on the 14th Saeima's Demand Committee.

After party member Kaspars Briškens was appointed as the Minister of Transport in the Cabinet of Evika Siliņa, A. Šuvajevs replaced Briškens as the chairman of the Progressives parliamentary faction.
