= United for Latvia =

Latvian political party

United for Latvia Vienoti Latvijai
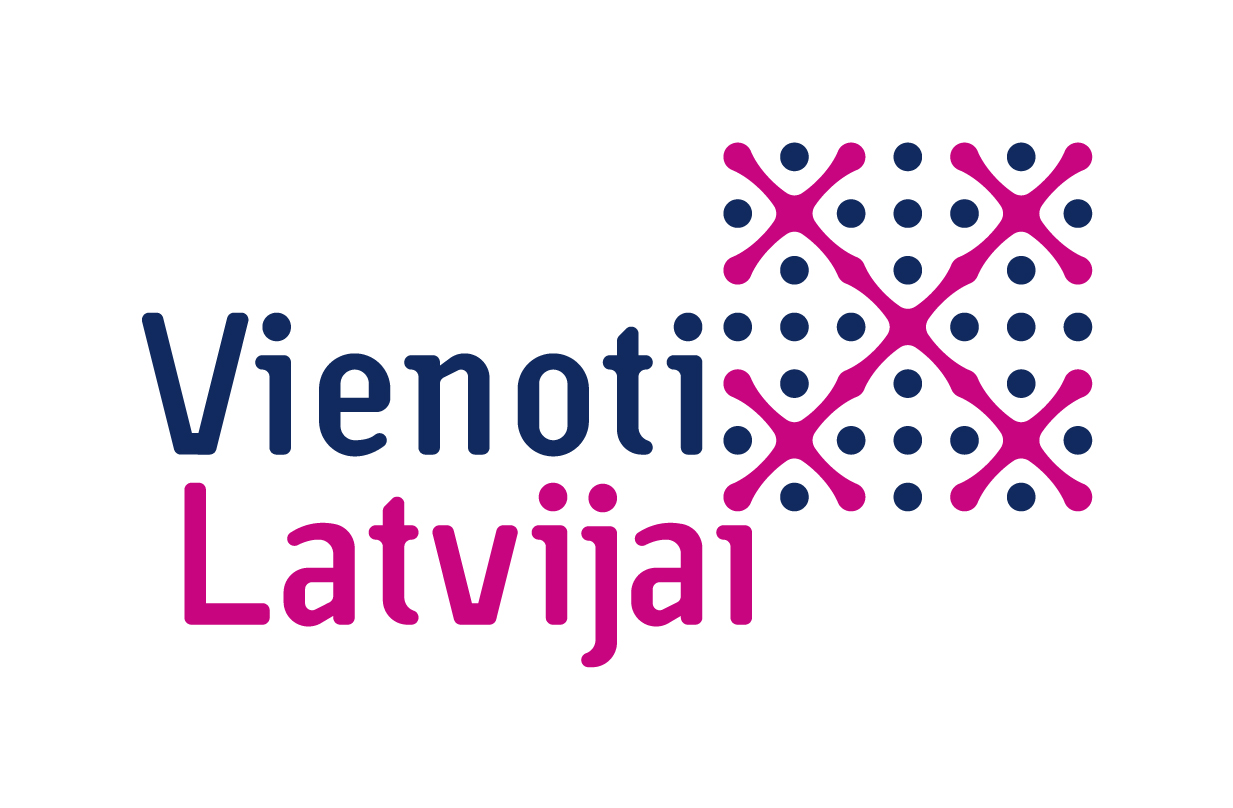
- Leader: Inese Muhamberga
- Founded: 2011
- Headquarters: Ventspils iela 4-10, Rēzekne, LV4601
- Ideology: Economic liberalism Populism
- Political position: Centre to centre-right
- Colours: Pink, blue
- Saeima: 0 / 100
- European Parliament: 0 / 8

Website
- vienotilatvijai.lv

United for Latvia (Latvian: Vienoti Latvijai) is a populist and economically liberal political party in Latvia. It was founded in 2011 in Rēzekne and in 2013 Ainārs Šlesers became party chairman. Šlesers has been dubbed one of the three "oligarchs" prominent in Latvian politics, and United for Latvia marks his return to electoral politics. He was previously leader of Latvia's First Party/Latvian Way and has served in several governments of Latvia including as Deputy Prime Minister in the government of Aigars Kalvītis and Minister of Transport in the second government of Ivars Godmanis, both of whom are party members. Other formerly prominent Latvian politicians who are now party members include Jānis Jurkāns and Jānis Straume. The party is yet to win seats in the Saeima or the European Parliament. Šlesers and several other party members have been in the past among the Latvian politicians most willing to cooperate with Harmony and other Russian parties in Latvia.

In February 2016, Inese Muhamberga replaced Šlesers as party leader. In May 2018 she announced that the party would not contest the 2018 Latvian parliamentary election.

== Election results ==
=== Legislative elections ===
Election	Party leader	Performance					Rank	Government
Election	Party leader	Votes	%	± pp	Seats	+/–	Rank	Government
2014	Ainārs Šlesers	10,788	1.19	New	0 / 100	New	8th	Extra-parliamentary
2018	Inese Muhamberga	Did not participate						Extra-parliamentary
2022	Inese Muhamberga	1,416	0.16	▼1.03	0 / 100	0	▼18th	Extra-parliamentary

== See also ==
- For a Good Latvia
