= 2013 Latvian municipal elections =

Municipal elections were held across Latvia on 1 June 2013. All 119 municipalities and republican cities of Latvia elected their city councils. In Riga, by far the largest city in Latvia, Harmony Centre won an absolute majority.

== Results ==
=== Riga ===
Party	Votes	%	Seats	+/–
Social Democratic Party "Harmony"	134,117	58.81	39	+13
National Alliance	40,920	17.94	12	+12
Unity	32,367	14.19	9	–13
Latvian Green Party	9,144	4.01	0	New
Latvian Farmers' Union	4,306	1.89	0	New
Reform Party	3,622	1.59	0	New
United for Latvia	1,089	0.48	0	New
For the Native Language!	774	0.34	0	New
Action Party	541	0.24	0	0
Latvian Social Democratic Workers' Party	477	0.21	0	0
Alternative	370	0.16	0	New
For Independent Latvia!, Solidarity	330	0.14	0	New
Total	228,057	100.00	60	0
Source: CVK
