= Baltic International Academy =

Educational institution in Riga, Latvia

Coordinates: 56.9378°N 24.1558°E

- Baltijas Starptautiskā akadēmija
- Former names: Baltic Russian Institute
- Motto: Ceļš uz panākumiem (Road to success)
- Type: Private
- Established: 1992; 34 years ago
- Affiliations: Erasmus+
- Students: 4,500
- Location: 4 Lomonosova Street, Riga, LV-1003, Latvia, Riga, Daugavpils, Liepāja, Rēzekne, Jēkabpils, Ventspils, Smiltene, Jelgava, Latvia
- Website: bsa.edu.lv

The Baltic International Academy (Latvian: Baltijas Starptautiskā akadēmija, Russian: Балтийская международная академия) is the largest degree-awarding tertiary educational institution in Latvia teaching primarily in the Russian language and the largest non-government higher education establishment in the Baltic countries. It was established in 1992 as the Baltic Russian Institute (Latvian: Baltijas Krievu institūts, Russian: Балтийский русский институт). It adopted its current name in 2006. The academy has its main campus in Riga and has locations in Daugavpils, Liepāja, Rēzekne, Jēkabpils, Ventspils, Smiltene and Jelgava.

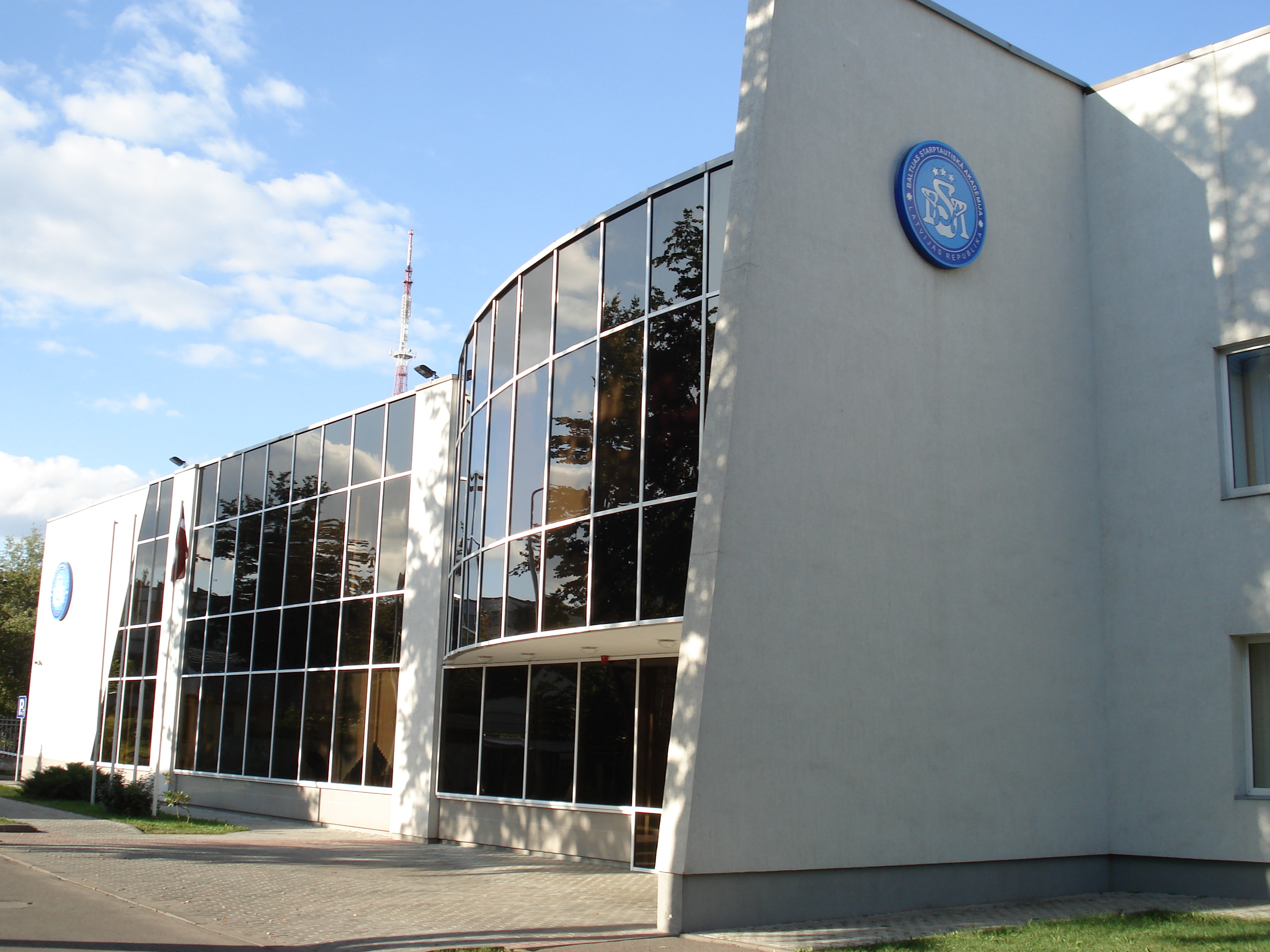
Baltic International Academy

== See also ==
- Education in Latvia
- List of universities in Europe founded after 1945
