= Zanda Kalniņa-Lukaševica =

Latvian politician (born 1978)

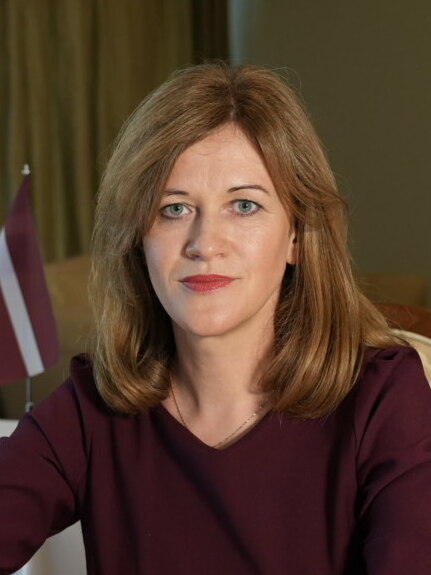

Deputy Speaker of the Saeima
- In office 1 November 2022
- Prime Minister: Krišjānis Kariņš
- Preceded by: Dagmāra Beitnere-Le Galla
- President: Egils Levits

Parliamentary Secretary of the Ministry of Foreign Affairs of the Republic of Latvia
- Incumbent
- Assumed office 2014 -2022
- President: Andris Bērziņš; Raimonds Vējonis; Egils Levits
- Prime Minister: Laimdota Straujuma; Māris Kučinskis; Krišjānis Kariņš

Personal details
- Born: 30 June 1978 (age 47)
- Party: Reform Party (2011–2014); Unity (2014–now)

Zanda Kalniņa-Lukaševica (born 30 June 1978) is a Latvian politician of the Unity party. Since 2022, she has been a Deputy Speaker and Member of Parliament of Latvia.

== Early life and education ==
In 2004, after having obtained her first academic degree in social work, Kalniņa-Lukaševica obtained her master's degree at the Faculty of Economics and Management of the University of Latvia. She holds a Doctoral degree (PhD) in Management Science with a focus on public administration from the Faculty of Economics and Management of the University of Latvia (2013).

Kalniņa-Lukaševica speaks Latvian, English, German and Russian languages.

== Early career ==
Kalniņa-Lukaševica started her professional career in 1998 at the City Council of Jūrmala. Between 2003 and 2008 she worked for the Ministry of Regional Development and Local Government, first, as Deputy Director of Local Government Development and Reform Department and then as Deputy State Secretary.

== Political career ==
In 2011, Kalniņa-Lukaševica was elected to the Parliament (Saeima) of Latvia, where she chaired the Committee on European Affairs (2011-2014) and the Subcommittee on Innovation and Research. She also served as a member of the Economic, Agricultural, Environmental and Regional Policy Committee. She played an active role during Latvia's accession process to the Organisation for Economic Co-operation and Development (OECD).

In November 2014, Kalniņa-Lukaševica was appointed as Parliamentary Secretary of the Ministry of Foreign Affairs of the Republic of Latvia, under the leadership of minister Edgars Rinkēvičs. As Parliamentary Secretary, she ensured communication of the Ministry of Foreign Affairs with the Latvian Parliament (Saeima) and European Parliament. She represented the government of Latvia at the EU Foreign Affairs Council meetings of Development Ministers and at the EU Foreign Affairs Council meetings of Trade Ministers. Since 2017, she chaired the Consultative Board for Development Cooperation Policy of Latvia. While Latvia held the rotating presidency of the Council of the European Union in 2015, represented the Council at the European Parliament's plenary sessions.

In 2022, Kalniņa-Lukaševica became a Deputy Speaker and a Member of Parliament of Latvia. In parliament, she is again a part of a Committee of Foreign Affairs and a Committee of European Affairs. In addition to her committee assignments, she has been chairing the Latvian delegation to the Parliamentary Assembly of the Council of Europe since 2023. On the Assembly, she has been chairing the Committee on the Honouring of Obligations and Commitments by Member States of the Council of Europe (since 2024) and a member of the Committee on Political Affairs and Democracy (since 2023). She also authored a 2025 report on resilience against foreign electoral intervention.

== Other activities ==
Kalniņa-Lukaševica is also known for her civic activities. She is a member of the board of a non-profit organization “European Movement–Latvia” and of the board of trustees of the Brussels based think tank Friends of Europe.

She is also 2017 European Young Leader in the Friends of Europe (EYL40) programme, and 2014 Munich Young Leader in the Munich Security Conference and Körber Foundation joint programme.

== Recognition ==
In 2016, Kalniņa-Lukaševica received an award of the Cabinet of Ministers for a significant contribution to ensuring Latvia’s successful accession to the OECD.
