= For a Humane Latvia =

Latvian political party

For a Humane Latvia Par cilvēcīgu Latviju
- Abbreviation: PCL
- Chairman: Māris Možvillo
- Founder: Artuss Kaimiņš
- Founded: 3 May 2016; 10 years ago (as Who Owns the State?) 12 December 2020; 5 years ago (rebranding)
- Dissolved: 2 September 2025
- Split from: Latvian Association of Regions
- Ideology: Right-wing populism; Conservatism
- Political position: Centre-right to right-wing
- National affiliation: Union for Latvia
- Colours: Cyan; Red; Grey
- Saeima: 0 / 100
- European Parliament: 0 / 8

Website
- cilvecigi.lv

For a Humane Latvia (Latvian: Par cilvēcīgu Latviju, PCL), previously known as Who Owns the State? (Kam pieder valsts?, KPV), was a right-wing populist political party in Latvia. Since 2022, it has been a member of the Union for Latvia (Latvian: Apvienība Latvijai) alliance together with the Heritage of the Fatherland party.

It was formed in 2016 by Artuss Kaimiņš under the name of KPV. It is positioned on the centre-right or right-wing on the political spectrum, and it is a conservative and Eurosceptic party that advocates for anti-corruption policies.

== History ==
=== Origins, success in 2018 ===
Initially known as just KPV, it changed its abbreviation to KPV LV on 21 June 2016, as an association by the same name already existed.

In July 2018, the party experienced a steep rise in ratings, reaching 7.0%, in comparison with 4.4% just a month before, and became the third most popular political party in Latvia. Political scientist Ivars Ijabs credited the rise to Kaimiņš, co-chairman of the party Atis Zakatistovs and businessman Viesturs Tamužs being detained by anti-graft police in late June for alleged illegal party financing that Kaimiņš claimed was politically motivated. In August the party's rating rose to 7.5%, but then dropped to 6.2% a month later. According to the results of a survey organized by the Union of European Latvians and the web portal latviesi.com, KPV LV was the most popular political party in the Latvian diaspora in September 2018, with nearly 25% in support. The party's prime minister candidate for the 2018 Latvian parliamentary election was attorney Aldis Gobzems.

KPV LV received the second largest number of votes (14.25%) among the parties participating in the 2018 Latvian parliamentary election and earned 16 seats in the 13th Saeima. After Jānis Bordāns of New Conservative Party (which also earned 16 seats in parliament) was unsuccessful in negotiating a governing coalition, President Raimonds Vējonis nominated Gobzems as Prime Minister of Latvia on 26 November 2018, however Gobzems was also unsuccessful in forming a government and on 10 December Vējonis withdrew his candidacy.

=== 2018–2019: internal divisions ===
"KPV LV" and "The Independents", the fractions the party has been a part of in Saeima and its representation in the government

On 4 February 2019 the party board voted to expel Gobzems from the party, with Kaimiņš citing damage to the party's image as the main reason, while Gobzems claimed he was expelled "in the interests of Artuss Kaimiņš". On 6 February 2019 Gobzems was subsequently removed from KPV LV's parliamentary group.

A week later the party's co-chairperson and member of the board Linda Liepiņa stepped down because of KPV LV joining a coalition she did not support and the recent actions of Kaimiņš among other things. After the latest developments in the faction and its vote in the presidential elections she also left the party and its parliamentary faction on 29 May. A day later Liepiņa was followed by MP Karina Sprūde who also left the party and its parliamentary faction. The once-candidate for the office of the President of Latvia, MP Didzis Šmits left the main KPV faction on 13 June although he has not yet said that he will leave the party.

=== 2020–present: loss of popularity, splits, rebrand ===
In 2020, the party suffered an electoral setback, receiving only 1.12% of the vote at the 2020 Riga City Council snap election. On December 12, 2020, during a party convention KPV LV members voted to remove chairman Atis Zakatistovs from the party, replace him with board member Rolands Millers and to rename the party to For a Humane Latvia (Latvian: Par cilvēcīgu Latviju). The change was contested by a splinter convention held the earlier same month, which prompted the Register of Enterprises of the Republic of Latvia (UR) to postpone the name change and return the submission documents for revision with a deadline of April 2021. On February 1, 2021, the Register of Enterprises registered the change of name and administrative board. A member of the Saeima, Ieva Krapāne, was elected as party leader during a congress on March 7, but twenty days later the board elected during the first December convention announced that they had regained recognition from the UR as the legitimate party board and will return to using KPV LV as the party name - a move described as a "technical move" and "provocation" by Krapāne.

On 21 April 2021, one of the party's three ministers in the incumbent Kariņš cabinet, the Minister of Economics Jānis Vitenbergs, left the party to join the National Alliance. The following day, the KPV LV parliamentary faction voted to remove Vitenbergs from the office of Minister of Economics. Later the same day, it was announced that he was to remain in office after all, after the KPV LV faction had changed its mind and chosen to continue supporting Vitenbergs as Minister of Economics. On 12 May, the party's 9 MPs held another vote on whether to force Vitenbergs' resignation from his ministerial role, with four MPs voting for, four against, and one abstaining. Subsequently, the four MPs who voted against removing Vitenbergs left the party and parliamentary faction.

In the run up to the 2022 election, on 27 April 2022 the party announced the formation of the Union for Latvia alliance together with the Latvian Social Democratic Workers' Party, albeit the Social Democrats later withdrew and joined the Union of Greens and Farmers. They were in turn replaced with the far-right Heritage of the Fatherland party. The Union for Latvia list received a mere 0.33% of votes, losing all of its MPs and state political party funding.

On 2 September 2025, by a decision of the Riga City Court, the party was officially dissolved.

== Ideology ==
The party was described as right-wing populist, populist, valence populist, anti-establishment, and Eurosceptic.

PCL's position on the European Union has been compared to that of Italy's Five Star Movement – not promoting "hard Euroscepticism" in line with the predominantly pro-EU majority of competing parties, but also taking critical stances of the EU's economic policies, including the euro.

== Election results ==
=== Legislative elections ===
Election	Party leader	Performance					Rank	Government
Election	Party leader	Votes	%	± pp	Seats	+/–	Rank	Government
2018	Aldis Gobzems	120,264	14.33	New	16 / 100	New	2nd	Coalition
2022*	Māris Možvillo	2,985	0.33	▼14.00	0 / 100	▼16	▼17th	Extra-parliamentary

- * result of the Union for Latvia alliance

=== European Parliament elections ===
Election	List leader	Votes	%	Seats	+/–	EP Group
2019	Kaspars Ģirģens	4,362	0.93 (#10)	0 / 8	New	–
2024 (Note: The TZV list didn't win any seat)	Aleksandrs Kiršteins	3,017	0.59 (#14)	0 / 9	0	–

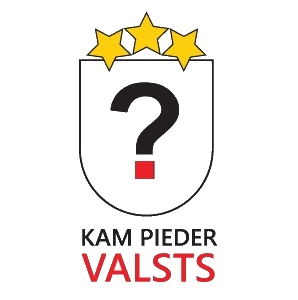
2016 logo

Logo before December 12, 2020

Logo briefly used between March 27 and June 4, 2021
