= Latvia First =

Latvian political party

Latvia First Latvija pirmajā vietā
- Abbreviation: LPV
- Chairperson: Ainārs Šlesers
- Founders: Ainārs Šlesers; Vilis Krištopans; Linda Liepiņa; Edmunds Zivtiņš; Līga Krapāne
- Founded: 14 August 2021; 5 years ago
- Headquarters: Alderu iela 6, Riga
- Youth wing: Jauniešu Organizācija Latvija Pirmajā Vietā
- Membership (2026): ▲1,853
- Ideology: National conservatism Right-wing populism
- Political position: Far-right
- European affiliation: ECPM (2024–2025); Patriots.eu (since 2025)
- European Parliament group: Patriots for Europe
- Colours: Burgundy
- Saeima: 17 / 100
- European Parliament: 1 / 9

Website
- latvijapirmajavieta.lv

Latvia First (Latvian: Latvija pirmajā vietā, LPV) is a right-wing populist and far-right political party in Latvia.

It was founded in August 2021 by businessman and former member of parliament, former Minister of Transport, former vice-mayor of Riga, Ainārs Šlesers. The party board chair is Ainārs Šlesers. The precursor to the party, the organisation Latvia — First (Latvian: Latvija — pirmajā vietā), was first registered on 1 July 2021, before the party itself was established at a founding congress on 14 August in Riga. The party was registered by the Latvian Register of Enterprises on 10 September 2021.

Latvia First is part of the Patriots for Europe group in the European Parliament.

== History ==
In spring 2021, businessman and former Minister of Transport and Minister of Economy Ainārs Šlesers announced that he would return to politics by founding a new party to contest the 2022 parliamentary election. On 1 July, he founded the organisation "Latvia Comes First" (Latvija – pirmajā vietā).

The founding party congress was held in Riga on 14 August 2021. Jūlija Stepaņenko was elected to chair the party board, as well as to be the party's candidate for the role of President of Latvia. Ainārs Šlesers became the party's candidate for the Prime Minister's seat, and former MP Linda Liepiņa was chosen as the party's candidate for Speaker of the Saeima.

Right after the founding party congress, LPV announced its support for the 18 August protest against compulsory vaccination organized by the Law and Order party. The protest was announced in response to the government bill that would make vaccination against COVID-19 mandatory for those working in healthcare, social-care, and education sectors and give employers the right to fire unvaccinated people. An hour before the start of the protest, LPV organized an election rally near the Freedom Monument, the crowd of several hundred party supporters then headed to the Riga Castle, where the main event took place.

The party subsequently organized two more protests against 'mandatory' vaccination on 18 September and 2 October. During the September protest, the party leaders unveiled an ultimatum to the President of Latvia Egils Levits, asking him to stop restricting people's freedoms, save 'voluntary' vaccination, and change the government. Levits was given two weeks to satisfy the demands, and, if not, the party promised to recall the President. Even though none of the demands were met after two weeks, no initiative on recalling Levits has been announced; instead, on 2 October, the party organized another protest near the Freedom Monument.

The party temporarily had two deputies in the Saeima – Jūlija Stepaņenko and Ļubova Švecova. Both were elected from the list of the Social Democratic Party "Harmony" in the 2018 Saeima elections. The party advocates for closer economic ties to Russia.

During Russia's invasion of Ukraine on 4 March 2022, both were expelled from the party, because Stepaņenko, the party's chairman of the board, protested the party's extended board meeting to discuss the party's attitude to the war in Ukraine and its consequences in Latvia. On 3 March, Švecova did not vote in the Saeima to grant Ukraine the status of a candidate country for the European Union.

Members of the Honor to serve Riga party ran as candidates on the party ticket for the 2022 election.

In June 2022, the Corruption Prevention and Combating Bureau found that campaign materials distributed by Latvia First and its leader Ainars Šlesers constituted political agitation and concluded that the party had violated campaign finance and disclosure requirements.

In November 2024, Latvia First leader Ainārs Šlesers endorsed Donald Trump's peace proposals in the Russo-Ukrainian War, suggesting that "a bad peace" was better than "a good war".

Ahead of the 2025 Latvian municipal elections, Latvia First leader Ainārs Šlesers campaigned on a populist platform promising rapid economic development, criticizing the political establishment, and pledging to transform Riga into the "Dubai of the North". His campaign focused on addressing the city's economic stagnation through infrastructure investment, tourism revival, and urban development while appealing to both Latvian- and Russian-speaking voters. The party won the most votes in Riga with 18.7%, however, it challenged the Riga municipal election results, alleging failures in the electronic voting system and irregularities in vote counting, and called for the results to be annulled, which was rejected by The Administrative Regional Court.

== Ideology and policies ==
Latvia First has been described as populist, "quasi-Trumpian" and Trumpist. According to its programme, Latvia First advocates prioritizing Latvia's national interests while supporting continued membership in NATO and the European Union. The party has been described as Christian right, and it combines socially conservative policies, including support for traditional family values and measures to address demographic decline, with proposals for lower taxes, deregulation, and investment in technology and infrastructure. It also supports stricter border controls, increased spending on national defence and internal security, and anti-corruption measures in public procurement.

== Election results ==
=== Legislative elections ===
Election	Party leader	Performance					Rank	Government
Election	Party leader	Votes	%	± pp	Seats	+/–	Rank	Government
2022	Ainārs Šlesers	57,033	6.31	New	9 / 100	New	6th	Opposition
2026 (Note: LPV list won 17 seats; 12 to LPV, 3 to KL, 1 to SL and 1 to D-MP)	Ainārs Šlesers	105,198	13.25	▲6.94	12 / 100	▲3	▲3rd	Opposition

=== European Parliament elections ===
Election	List leader	Votes	%	Seats	+/–	EP Group
2024	Vilis Krištopans	32,034	6.23 (#7)	1 / 9	New	PfE
