= Alliance of Young Latvians =

Latvian populist political party

Alliance of Young Latvians Apvienība Jaunlatvieši
- Abbreviation: AJ
- Leader: Rūdolfs Brēmanis; Edgars Dārznieks; Artūrs Klēbahs
- Founded: 11 February 2023
- Headquarters: Riga
- Membership (2023): 530
- Ideology: Conservatism; Right-wing populism; Protectionism
- Political position: Right-wing
- Colours: Red
- Saeima: 4 / 100
- European Parliament: 0 / 9

Website
- jaunlatviesi.lv

Alliance of Young Latvians (Latvian: Apvienība Jaunlatvieši, AJ) is a populist Latvian political party founded on February 11, 2023. The party board includes former members of For Each and Every One (now Platform 21) Rūdolfs Brēmanis, Edgars Dārznieks and Artūrs Klēbahs. The party claims to stand for Latvian protectionism, a popularly elected president and reduction of bureaucracy and states that Latvia "must be independent from the East or the West". The party had one member of the Saeima, former member of For Stability! Glorija Grevcova.

Brēmanis, a former charge- d'affaires at the Latvian embassy in the United Arab Emirates, is the main suspect in case about a possible embezzlement scheme involving the service apartments of the foreign service. Public Broadcasting of Latvia also reported that Brēmanis might have engaged in the residency permits-for-investment business while still being in the diplomatic service.

== History ==
In the 2024 elections to the European Parliament, the party fielded the Russophone homemaker Olga Čerņavska (Russian: Ольга Чернявская), who previously had not been active in politics. In the campaigning period, Latvia's State Security Service investigated her statements that were considered to be anti-Latvian and pro-Russian. In mid-June 2024, she defected to Belarus, claiming 'electoral falsification' and 'death threats.' The propaganda of the regime of Alexander Lukashenko has used her to publish content that attacks Latvian government and other institutions by using pro-Russian narratives (which is similar to the case of the Polish judge Tomasz Szmydt who defected to Belarus in May 2024).

In Belarus, Čerņavska joined former COVID-19 misinformation activist Romāns Samuļs (Russian: Роман Самуль). He had defected from Latvia to Belarus in 2022, after having failed to win a mandate to the Latvian Parliament. In Belarus, Samul acts as a leader of a group of disillusioned Russophones from Latvia for the sake of anti-Latvian propaganda.

For the 2025 municipal elections, AJ formed an alliance with the Sovereign Power party, with other parties including the Latvian Russian Union also being represented.

== Election results ==
=== Legislative elections ===
Election	Party leader	Performance					Rank	Government
Election	Party leader	Votes	%	± pp	Seats	+/–	Rank	Government
2026 (Note: SV/AJ list won 15 seats; 9 to SV, 4 to AJ and 2 to LKS)	Rūdolfs Brēmanis	94,211	11.87	New	4 / 100	New	▲8th	Opposition

=== European Parliament elections ===
Election	List leader	Votes	%	Seats	+/–	EP Group
2024	Rūdolfs Brēmanis	11,067	2.15 (#10)	0 / 9	New	–
