= 2025 Latvian municipal elections =

Municipal elections were held across Latvia on 7 June 2025.

The elections were held in 42 municipalities. On 1 June 2021, the Constitutional Court of Latvia ruled that the annexation of Varakļāni Municipality to Rēzekne Municipality was unconstitutional. In response, the Saeima decided to preserve the existence of Varakļāni Municipality as a 43rd local government unit until 2025. In June 2024 the Saeima decreed that Varakļāni Municipality would be merged into Madona Municipality and 2025 Madona municipal election was held within the new borders.

== Electoral system ==
All 731 councilors are elected using open-list proportional representation with a 5% electoral threshold. Seats are allocated using the Saint-Laguë method. The number of councilors was determined by the Central Election Committee based on the number of residents in a given municipality.

Seat allocation for the 2025 local elections
Councilors	Municipality/State City	Comments
60	Riga	
23	Ogre Municipality	more than 60,000 residents
19	Bauska Municipality, Cēsis Municipality, South Kurzeme Municipality, Jelgava Municipality, Jēkabpils Municipality, Ķekava Municipality, Madona Municipality, Mārupe Municipality, Ropaži Municipality, Sigulda Municipality, Talsi Municipality, Tukums Municipality, Valmiera Municipality	municipalities with more than 30,000 but less than 60,000 residents
15	Daugavpils, Jelgava, Jūrmala, Liepāja, Ādaži Municipality, Aizkraukle Municipality, Alūksne Municipality, Augšdaugava Municipality, Balvi Municipality, Dobele Municipality, Gulbene Municipality, Krāslava Municipality, Kuldīga Municipality, Limbaži Municipality, Līvāni Municipality, Ludza Municipality, Olaine Municipality, Preiļi Municipality, Rēzekne Municipality, Salaspils Municipality, Saldus Municipality, Saulkrasti Municipality, Smiltene Municipality, Valka Municipality, Ventspils Municipality	municipalities with less than 30,000 residents and state cities with more than 50,000 residents, except Riga
13	Rēzekne, Ventspils	state cities with fewer than 50,000 residents

=== Voting rights ===
The right to participate in municipal elections is for citizens of Latvia and other European Union Member States who were 18 years of age and are eligible to vote. To participate in municipal elections in Latvia, citizens of the European Union must be registered in the Latvian Population Register 90 days before the elections. All voters must be registered in the Voters Register as well. Voters have the right to vote in the local government where they have their registered place of residence 90 days before election day or in the local government where they own real estate registered.

Voters who have the right to vote in municipal elections, but who will be abroad during the election, can vote by mail from abroad.

== New ballot papers ==
Starting with the 2025 local elections, new ballot papers will be in force in Latvia. The main changes will affect those voters who wish to highlight one of the candidates in particular, or express a negative attitude towards one of the candidates on the selected list. Until now, it was customary for candidates whom a particular voter particularly supports to be marked with a "+" sign, and undesirable ones to be simply crossed out. According to this new ballot paper model, next to each candidate's name there will be two differently colored fields, and the voter will be able to shade one – the green field – if they particularly support a candidate, or shade the other – the red field – if they find the particular candidate unacceptable.

== Results ==
=== Daugavpils ===
Party	Votes	%	Seats	+/–
Go, Latgale!	15,879	69.03	14	New
For Latvia's Development	1,601	6.96	1	▲1
Latvia First, Latgale Party	1,119	4.86	0	▼2
Daugavpils Municipality Party, Latvian Green Party	1,073	4.66	0	▼2
National Alliance	1,053	4.58	0	New
Daugavpils – mana pils	818	3.56	0	New
For Stability!	700	3.04	0	New
Sovereign Power, Alliance of Young Latvians	523	2.27	0	New
Together for Latvia	159	0.69	0	New
Union of Greens and Farmers	77	0.33	0	Steady
Total	23,002	100.00	15	0
Valid votes	23,002	98.82		
Invalid/blank votes	275	1.18		
Total votes	23,277	100.00		
Registered voters/turnout	54,893	42.40		
Source: Central Election Commission of Latvia

=== Jelgava ===
Party	Votes	%	Seats	+/–
Union of Greens and Farmers	3,440	19.15	3	▼3
Sovereign Power, Alliance of Young Latvians	3,357	18.69	3	New
New Unity	1,946	10.83	2	Steady
National Alliance	1,869	10.40	2	Steady
Movement For!	1,805	10.05	2	Steady
New Conservative Party	1,381	7.69	1	▲1
Latvian Association of Regions	1,371	7.63	1	Steady
Latvia First	1,206	6.71	1	New
Latvian Green Party	755	4.20	0	New
The Progressives	558	3.11	0	Steady
Social Democratic Party "Harmony"	215	1.20	0	▼1
Centre Party	62	0.35	0	New
Total	17,965	100.00	15	0
Valid votes	17,965	98.98		
Invalid/blank votes	185	1.02		
Total votes	18,150	100.00		
Registered voters/turnout	38,531	47.10		
Source: Central Election Commission of Latvia

=== Jūrmala ===
Party	Votes	%	Seats	+/–
Latvian Green Party	6,771	35.52	6	New
National Alliance	4,296	22.54	4	▲2
Union of Greens and Farmers	2,351	12.33	2	▼6
Social Democratic Party "Harmony"	1,491	7.82	1	▼1
The Progressives	1,409	7.39	1	▲1
Latvia First	1,167	6.12	1	New
New Unity	680	3.57	0	▼1
Sovereign Power, Alliance of Young Latvians	507	2.66	0	New
Jūrmala – Our Home	333	1.75	0	Steady
Centre Party	58	0.30	0	New
Total	19,063	100.00	15	0
Valid votes	19,063	98.67		
Invalid/blank votes	256	1.33		
Total votes	19,319	100.00		
Registered voters/turnout	38,980	49.56		
Source: Central Election Commission of Latvia

=== Liepāja ===
Party	Votes	%	Seats	+/–
Liepāja Party	9,144	46.14	9	▲3
Latvian Association of Regions	4,050	20.43	4	▼1
National Alliance	1,854	9.35	2	▲1
Latvian Russian Union	929	4.69	0	New
Social Democratic Party "Harmony"	878	4.43	0	▼2
New Unity	807	4.07	0	Steady
For Stability!	570	2.88	0	New
Movement For!	563	2.84	0	▼1
Sovereign Power, Alliance of Young Latvians	507	2.56	0	New
Latvia First	440	2.22	0	New
Latvian Green Party	77	0.39	0	New
Total	19,819	100.00	15	0
Valid votes	19,819	98.92		
Invalid/blank votes	216	1.08		
Total votes	20,035	100.00		
Registered voters/turnout	46,029	43.53		
Source: Central Election Commission of Latvia

=== Rēzekne ===
Party	Votes	%	Seats	+/–
Latvia First, Together for Latvia	5,139	50.95	8	New
National Alliance, New Unity, For Latvia's Development	1,789	17.74	3	Steady
Latvian Green Party, Latvian Association of Regions, New Conservative Party	1,211	12.01	2	▼1
The Progressives	486	4.82	0	▼1
Latgale Party	319	3.16	0	▼3
Sovereign Power, Alliance of Young Latvians	288	2.86	0	New
Social Democratic Party "Harmony"	280	2.78	0	▼8
Go, Latgale!	253	2.51	0	New
Union of Greens and Farmers	235	2.33	0	New
Latvian Russian Union	87	0.86	0	New
Total	10,087	100.00	13	0
Valid votes	10,087	99.13		
Invalid/blank votes	89	0.87		
Total votes	10,176	100.00		
Registered voters/turnout	10,176	100.00		
Source: Central Election Commission of Latvia

=== Rīga ===
Party	Votes	%	Seats	+/–
Latvia First	38,793	18.29	13	New
The Progressives	35,497	16.74	11	Steady
National Alliance	30,328	14.30	10	▲6
New Unity	27,548	12.99	9	▼1
Sovereign Power, Alliance of Young Latvians	25,912	12.22	8	New
For Stability!	14,813	6.98	5	New
United List	13,421	6.33	4	New
For Latvia's Development	9,053	4.27	0	▼3
Social Democratic Party "Harmony"	7,375	3.48	0	▼12
Honor to serve Riga!, Union of Greens and Farmers	5,273	2.49	0	▼5
Platform 21	1,586	0.75	0	New
Self-respect, People.Land.Statehood.	783	0.37	0	New
New Conservative Party	751	0.35	0	▼4
Latvian Revival Party	499	0.24	0	New
Socialist Party of Latvia	366	0.17	0	New
Centre Party	105	0.05	0	Steady
Total	212,103	100.00	60	0
Valid votes	212,103	99.13		
Invalid/blank votes	1,852	0.87		
Total votes	213,955	100.00		
Registered voters/turnout	409,130	52.30		
Source: Central Election Commission of Latvia

=== Ventspils ===
Party	Votes	%	Seats	+/–
For Latvia and Ventspils	4,355	47.56	7	Steady
National Alliance	1,558	17.01	2	▲1
United List, New Conservative Party	1,467	16.02	2	▲1
Movement For!, New Unity	713	7.79	1	▼1
For Stability!	524	5.72	1	New
Sovereign Power, Alliance of Young Latvians	222	2.42	0	New
Latvia First	219	2.39	0	New
Social Democratic Party "Harmony"	99	1.08	0	Steady
Total	9,157	100.00	13	0
Valid votes	9,157	98.95		
Invalid/blank votes	97	1.05		
Total votes	9,254	100.00		
Registered voters/turnout	22,934	40.35		
Source: Central Election Commission of Latvia

== Aftermath ==
After the polling stations closed, problems with the ballot scanning system provided by the State Digital Development Agency (SDAA) led to a manual count, delaying the election results. Kristīne Saulīte, head of the Central Election Commission (CVK), said an investigation would be needed into the incident. On 9 June, Minister of Smart Administration and Regional Development Inga Bērziņa suspended the director of the State Digital Development Agency, Jorens Liopa, responsible for the electoral system, from his duties. On 11 June, taking responsibility for problems with information technology solutions supporting the election process, Minister I. Bērziņa herself resigned from her position. On same day, the head of the Central Election Commission (CVK), Kristīne Saulīte, has nevertheless decided to resign from her position, in following day.
