= Aldis Gobzems =

Latvian politician and lawyer

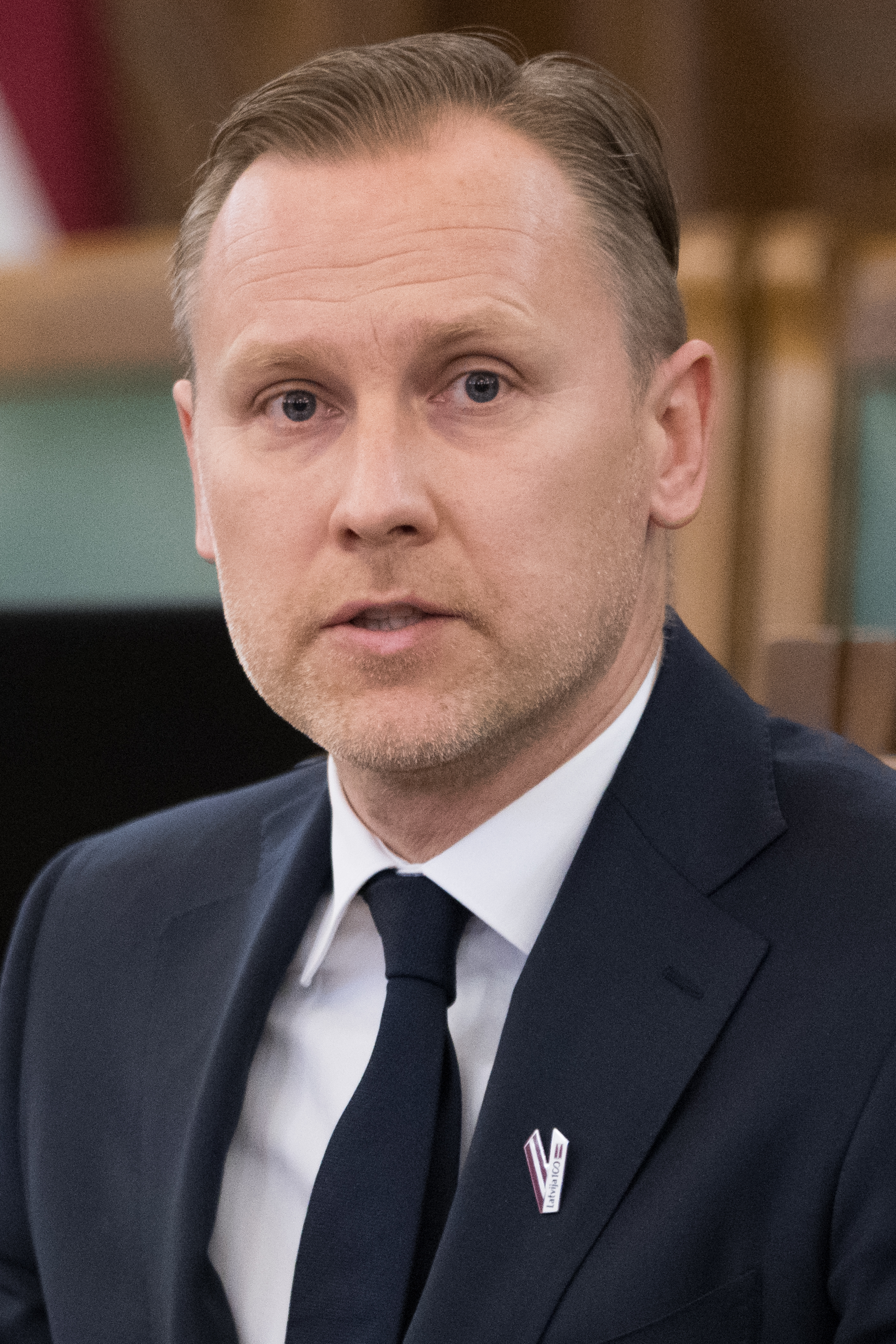
- Aldis Gobzems in 2018

Member of 13th Saeima
- In office November 6, 2018 – November 1, 2022

Personal details
- Born: October 10, 1978 (age 48) Kuldīga, Latvian SSR, USSR (now Latvia)
- Other political affiliations: Gobzems' List (2026–present); For Each and Every One (2021–2022); Independent (2019–2021); Who Owns the State? (2018–2019); Society for Political Change (2008–2009)
- Occupation: Politician, lawyer
- Website: Personal Twitter account Facebook page Personal Facebook account Personal Instagram account Personal YouTube channel

Aldis Gobzems, also known as Arigo Toro (born October 10, 1978) is a Latvian politician and lawyer. He first rose to prominence as a lawyer who represented victims of the 2013 Zolitūde shopping centre roof collapse, and was the prime ministerial candidate for the Who Owns the State? party in the 2018 Latvian parliamentary elections.

After being elected into parliament, Gobzems was nominated by President Raimonds Vējonis on November 26, 2018, to attempt to form and lead a new government by becoming Prime Minister of Latvia, but his nomination was revoked on December 10 after negotiations with other parties failed. After an increasingly public dispute with fellow Who Owns the State? leader Artuss Kaimiņš, he was expelled from the party on February 4, 2019. After failing to be re-elected in 2022, he moved to Spain, adopting the name Arigo Toro He formed the fringe Gobzems' List party for the 2026 election, but wasn't a candidate, and the list gathered less than one percent.

He has commonly been described as a populist by media, while he has described his former party as part of a "right-of-center bloc".

== Legal career ==
Gobzems began representing victims of the Zolitūde shopping centre roof collapse in November 2013, the largest single loss of life in Latvia since its restoration of independence in 1991. By December, the Latvian Collegium of Sworn Advocates had filed an ethic complaint against Gobzems regarding his work in representing the victims. Despite this, Gobzems continued serving, and the courts ordered Maxima Latvija to begin paying compensation to victims in December 2015.

On November 28, 2018, the collegium revoked Gobzems' law license over comments made about the murder of insolvence administrator Mārtiņš Bunkus that were deemed inappropriate. Gobzems criticized the action taken as politically motivated and aimed at preventing him from obtaining the position of Prime Minister of Latvia that he had been nominated to two days prior by President Raimonds Vējonis. As of April 2019, he was still fighting the decision in court.

== Political career ==
Gobzems' political activity began in 2008 as a member of Society for Political Change, to which he donated €7,804 in 2009. When that party merged with others to form the Unity faction, he continued as a member and donated €12,000 despite not running as a candidate for either party. For the 2018 Latvian parliamentary election, Gobzems was chosen by the Who Owns the State? party as their prime ministerial candidate and symbolically placed as the last number on the list. Under his leadership, the party won 16 seats in Saeima, tied for second most with the New Conservative Party.

=== Nomination for Prime Minister ===
After Jānis Bordāns was unsuccessful in negotiating a governing coalition, President Raimonds Vējonis nominated Gobzems as Prime Minister of Latvia on November 26, 2018, and gave him two weeks to form a government. A week later, he proposed a coalition that would consist of his Who Owns the State? party along with the New Conservative Party, the National Alliance, the Union of Greens and Farmers, and New Unity, despite the conservatives' objection to the Greens and Farmers' inclusion in government. Fellow Who Owns the State? party leader Artuss Kaimiņš also opposed the inclusion of the Greens and Farmers, leading to a breakdown in talks later in the week. Gobzems then retracted his proposal for the coalition and instead called for a non-partisan cabinet of unnamed "best of the best" industry professionals, a proposal that was nearly immediately rejected by the conservatives, the nationalists, and New Unity on the grounds that it could increase the influence of the Harmony party. Although he had initially called on the president to hold early elections if his proposal were to be rejected, Gobzems instead offered a new four-party coalition that would not include the Union of Greens and Farmers. The president revoked Gobzems' nomination on December 10, 2018.

=== Expulsion from Who Owns the State? ===
Following Gobzems' failure to form a government, Who Owns the State? insisted on his promotion to Minister of the Interior despite the refusal of likely prime minister nominee Krišjānis Kariņš to give him a position in the cabinet. Although the party at first refused to consider a different candidate, they backed down from their demand on January 3, 2019, and instead nominated Sandis Ģirģens. Kaimiņš then called on Kariņš to exclude Gobzems from the rest of the coalition building process, worsening a split between the two Who Owns the State? leaders which then lead to Gobzems' refusal to support the new Kariņš-led government as well as a vote of no confidence against Kaimiņš as party leader. Although the vote was split evenly, Kaimiņš survived the motion. Relations between Gobzems and Kaimiņš reached their lowest point during the January 23 vote to confirm Kariņš' government, with the two using their speaking time during the discussion to insult and accuse one another of corruption. Gobzems and four other Who Owns the State? deputies voted against the government despite their party's membership in the coalition, and two days later he testified against Kaimiņš to the Corruption Prevention and Combating Bureau over an alleged bribe. On February 4, Who Owns the State? members voted to expel Gobzems from the party, with Kaimiņš citing damage to the party's image as the main reason and Gobzems promising to found a new party. Gobzems was subsequently removed from KPV LV's parliamentary group on February 6, 2019.

=== Independent deputy ===
After being ejected from Who Owns the State?, Gobzems became one of two independent members of Saeima along with Jūlija Stepaņenko who left the Harmony party on the first day of the parliamentary session. On March 12, 2019, he reiterated his promise to form a new party, predicting that the requisite five members could easily be drawn from the other parties and that by the end of the year his new party would have more seats in parliament that New Unity. On April 3, he joined Stepaņenko along with three rebel members of his former party and opposition parties Harmony and Union of Greens and Farmers in voting against the 2019 state budget. On April 11, he led a vote of no confidence against prime minister Krisjānis Kariņš that failed 58 to 33.

=== Security clearance controversy ===
On November 20, 2018, it was announced the Latvian Constitution Protection Bureau announced that Gobzems would have to go through additional steps in the vetting process before receiving a security clearance required to access state secrets. This became problematic when he was nominated by the president to form a government a week later, as potential coalition partners expressed skepticism over a potential head of government without access to sensitive information. On April 18, 2019, Gobzems was invited by the Constitution Protection Bureau for an interview regarding the clearance process, after which he expressed doubt that he would be granted access and promised to appeal such a decision. On April 30, he was officially denied access to state secrets by the bureau.

=== "For Each and Every One" party ===
Since being expelled from KPV LV in February 2019, Gobzems had rumoured starting a new political party. On October 10, 2020, Gobzems held a preliminary kick-off event for his new party in Riga, promising to found his new party by November 22 the same year. Due to a national state on emergency, caused by the COVID-19 pandemic, and introduced in Latvia on November 9, that – among other things – put a temporary ban on gathering enough people to legally register a political party, the party registration was postponed. In a December 28 interview with Latvijas Avīze, Gobzems said that he would register the party on January 8, 2021.

The party, named Law and Order, went on to be founded on January 8, 2021, consisting of four Saeima deputies, including Gobzems himself. Gobzems and fellow MP Jūlija Stepaņenko were announced to be party co-chairmen. On 20 June of that year, Stepaņenko and fellow Saeima deputy Ļubova Švecova announced that they were leaving the party due to Gobzems' controversial use of the Star of David imagery to protest COVID-19 measures.

On 19 February 2022 at the meeting of the representatives of the party congress, it was decided to name the party - from "Law and Order" to "For each and every", retaining Aldis Gobzems as the chairman of the party. It was also decided to change the party's logo. In order for the decision to change the batch name to take effect, it must still be approved by the Register of Enterprises.

On 2 October 2022, Gobzems announced on social media that he is leaving the party and politics for time being after his party didn't reach the 5% barrier to enter the parliament.

== Political views ==
Gobzems has been described by both domestic and international media as a populist, but he has called his party part of a "right-of-center bloc" of parliamentary factions. During the 2018 parliamentary election, he spoke negatively of the country's political elite and claimed that politicians and the media were covering up massive scandals and keeping the population in poverty. One of his most major proposals has been the elimination of the "coalition council" discussion group between parties participating in government that meets regularly to set their policy agenda, which Gobzems has described as an "unconstitutional organization". He has also proposed reducing the amount of ministries from 13 to 6, a proposal that he backed away from after becoming the prime ministerial nominee but later re-committed to after being rejected by his potential coalition partners.

=== Cooperation with other parties ===
Gobzems has been relatively open to working with the Harmony parliamentary faction, saying that quite many of his voters do not object to that, but in reality that is impossible at the moment and did not invite them into his potential coalition when he was nominated to become prime minister. He also refused to invite the Development/For! into coalition for allegedly being a tool of businessman and politician Edgars Jaunups, but he did invite the Union of Greens and Farmers despite having previously criticized that party for connections with oligarch Aivars Lembergs.

=== COVID-19 ===
Gobzems has been an outspoken critic of government measures to contain COVID-19. On 5 July 2021, the Saeima Mandate, Ethics and Submissions Committee initiated disciplinary action against Gobzems for photographing himself wearing a Star of David badge on his chest, equating different opportunities for vaccinated and unvaccinated people in Latvia with treatment of Jewish people during the Holocaust by the Nazi On 30 August 2021, he was fined by state police a total of 2,350 for organizing an unauthorized public protest against possible compulsory vaccination measure.

== Personal life ==
Gobzems has been married with Krista Gobzema since 2015. The couple have a daughter named Adriana (born 2016) and gave birth to a son in January 2019. On 6 April 2021, Gobzems announced that the couple had decided to divorce. In May 2022, he publicly announced that he is gay in a Saeima speech. Despite that, he's not supportive of LGBT rights in Latvia.
