= 2024 European Parliament election in Latvia =

- 8 June 2024

9 Latvian seats to the European Parliament
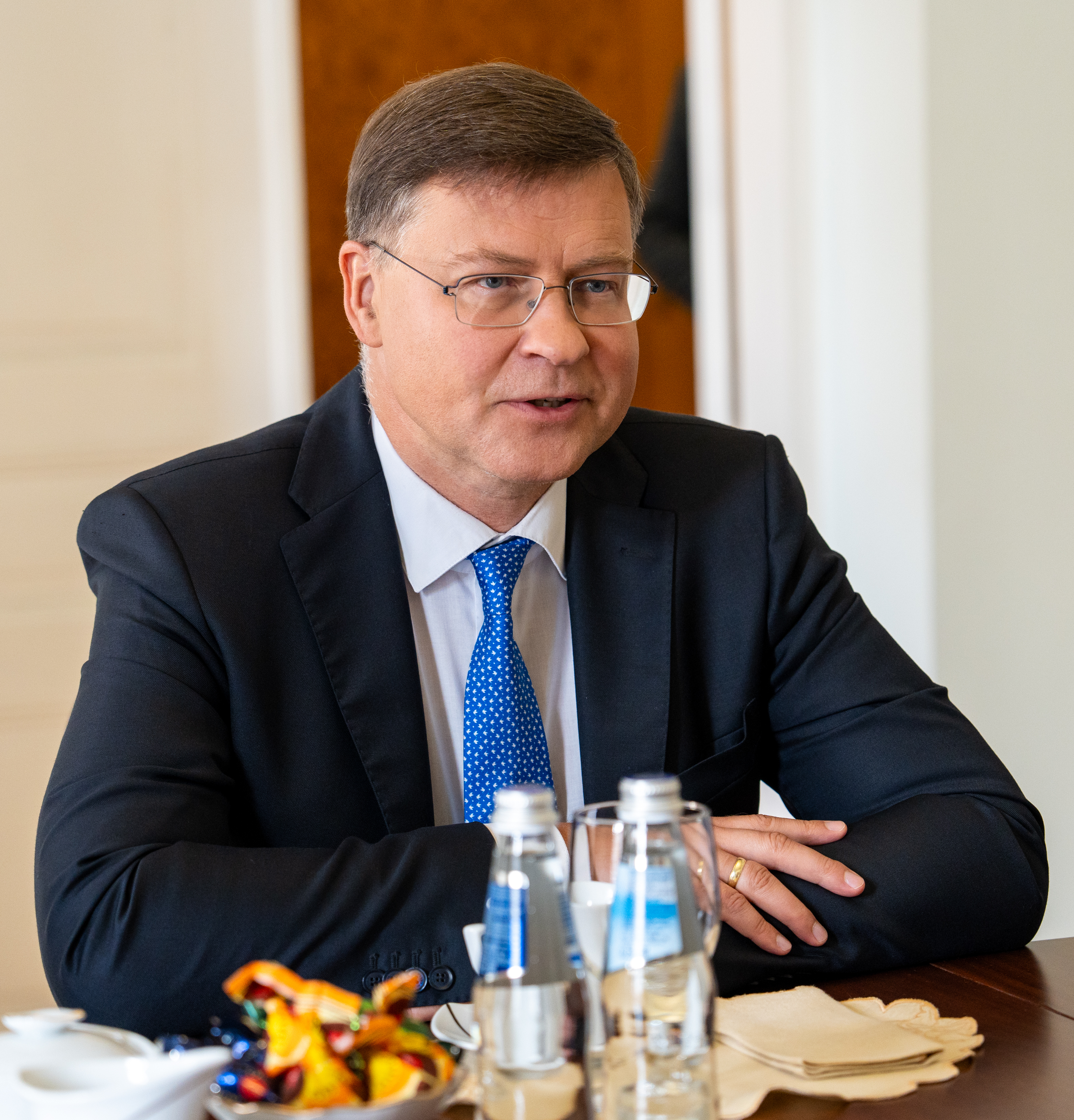

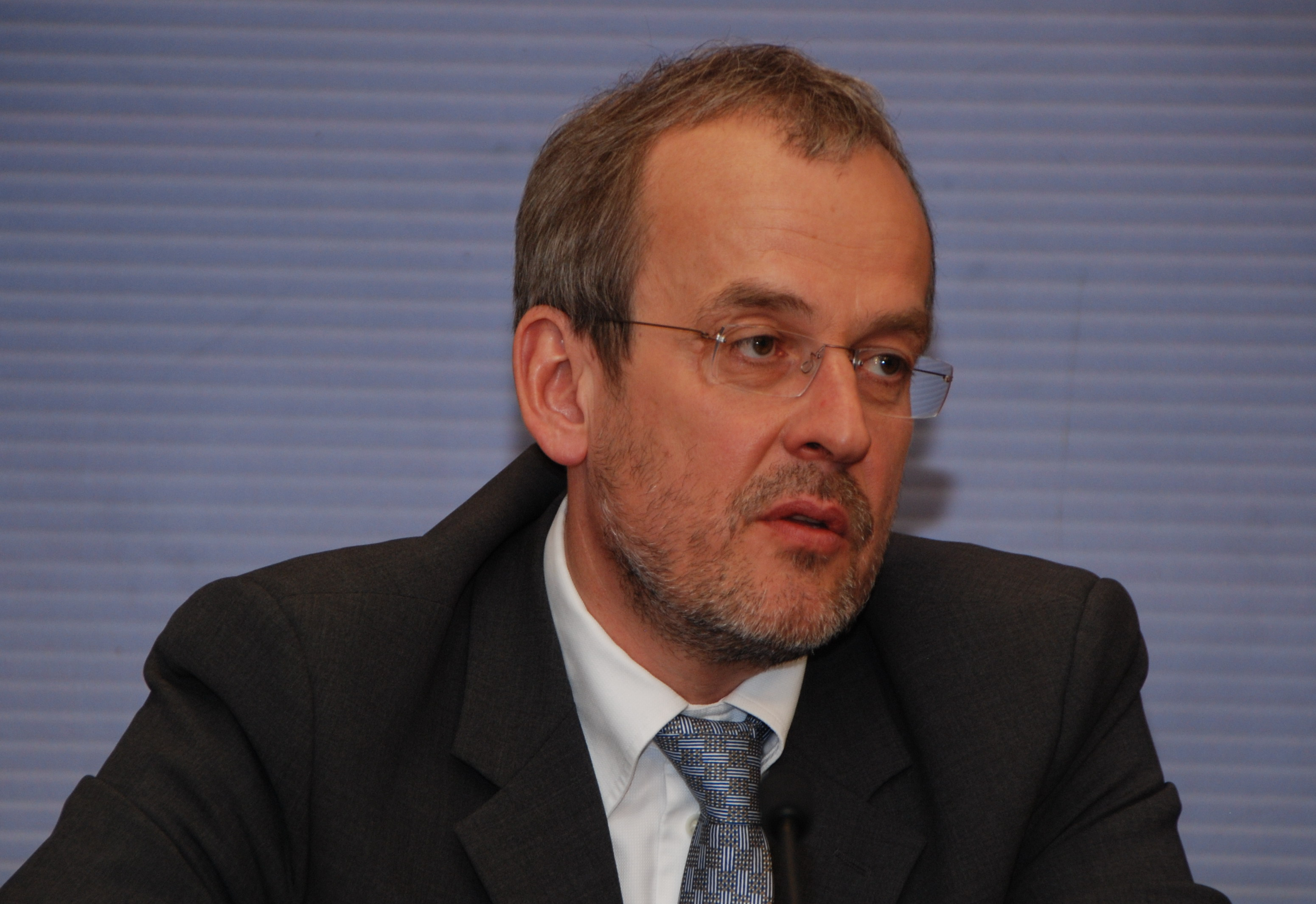

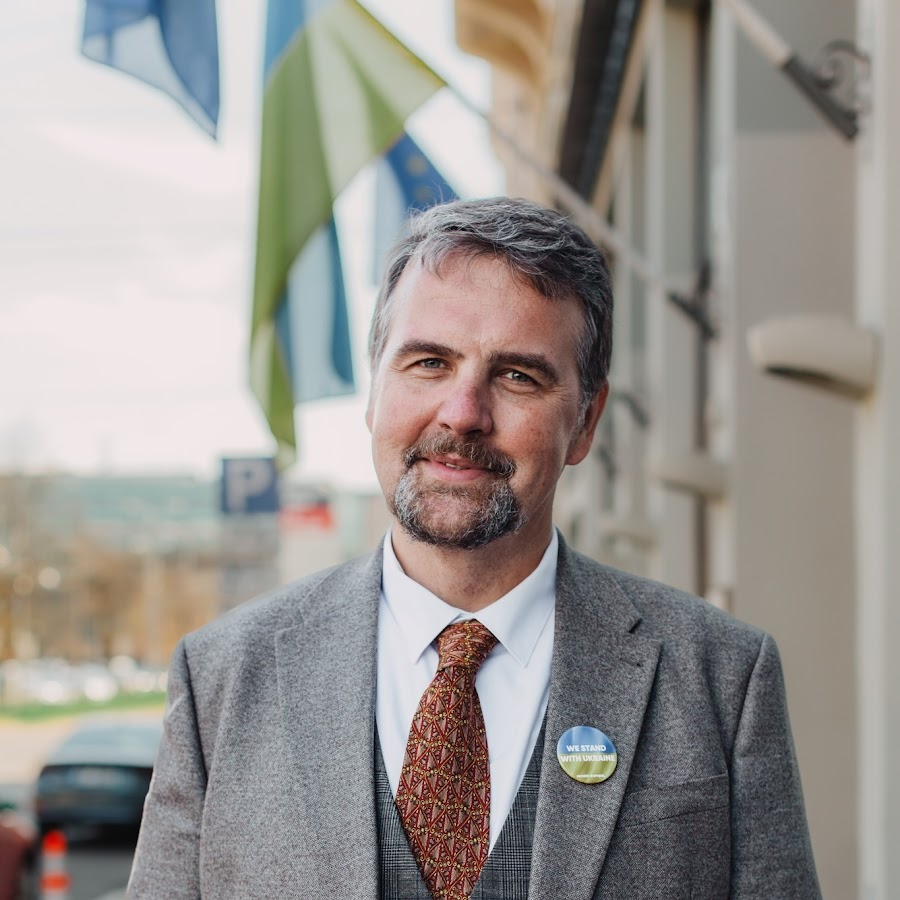

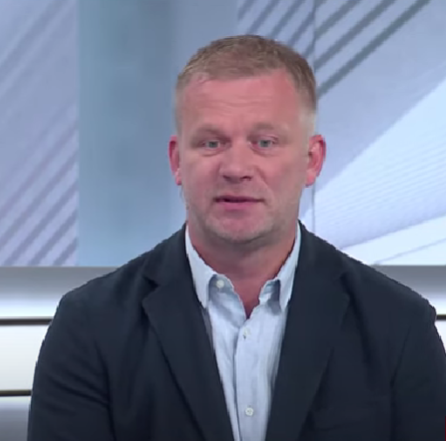

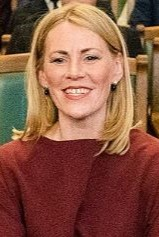

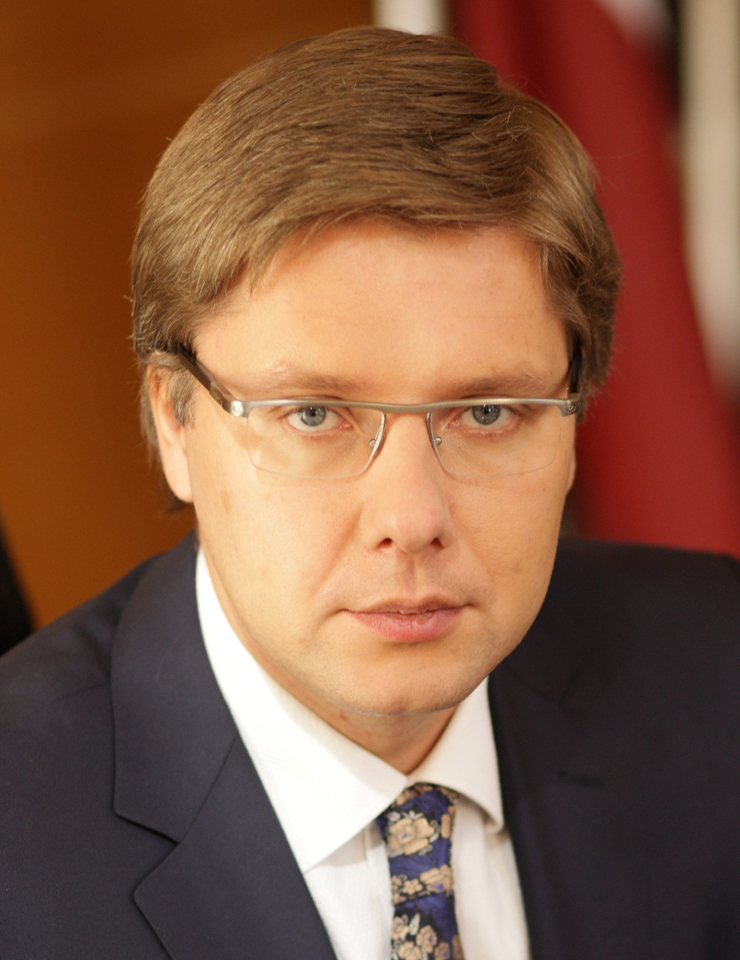

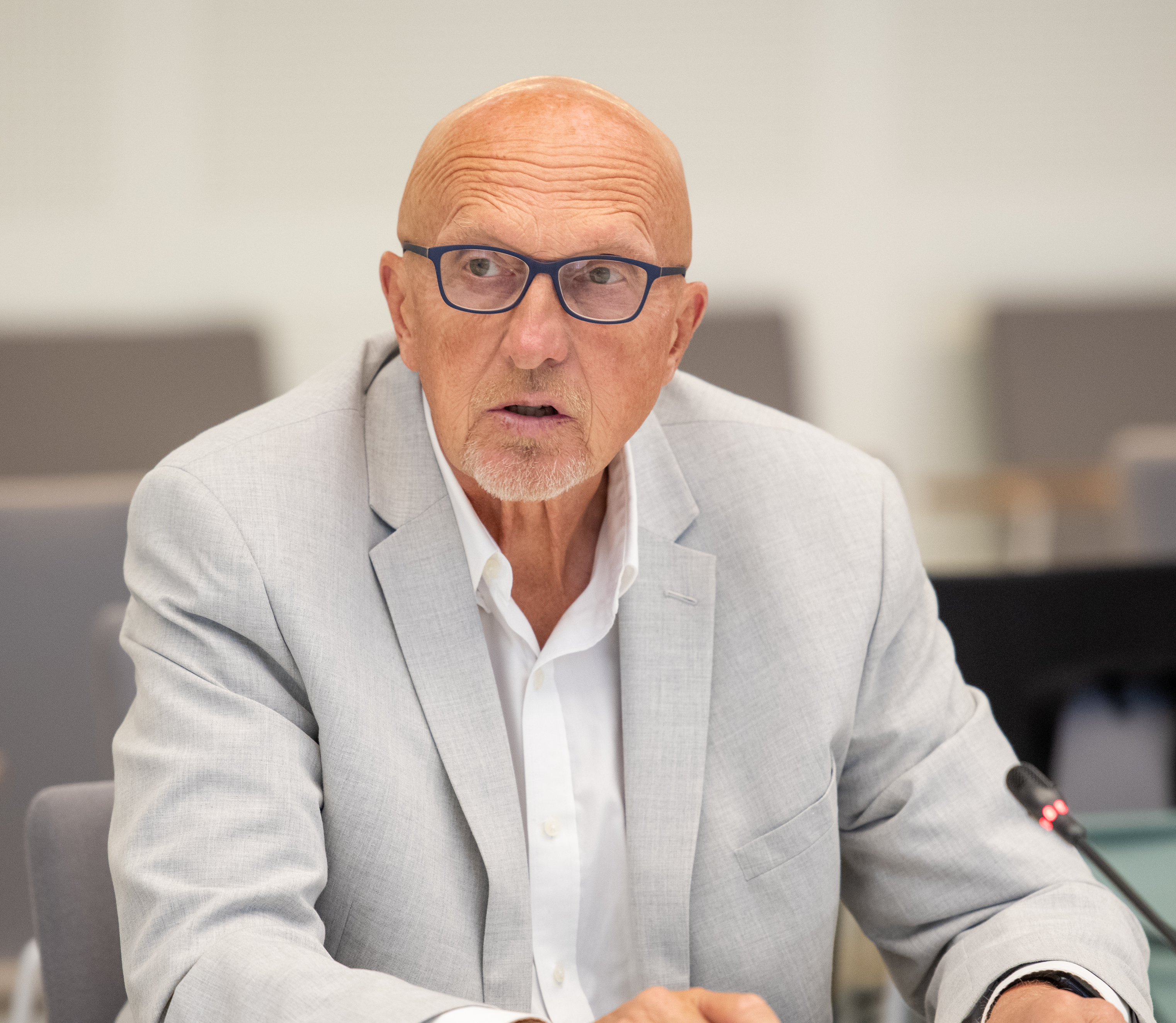
	First party	Second party	Third party
Leader	Valdis Dombrovskis	Roberts Zīle	Ivars Ijabs
Party	JV	NA	LA
Alliance	EPP	ECR	RE
Last election	26.40%, 2 seats	16.49%, 2 seats	12.49%, 1 seat (Note: As Development/For!)
Seats won	2	2	1
Seat change	Steady	Steady	Steady
Popular vote	130,563	114,858	48,696
Percentage	25.37%	22.32%	9.46%
Swing	▼1.03pp	▲5.83pp	▼3.03pp
	Fourth party	Fifth party	Sixth party
Leader	Reinis Pozņaks	Elīna Pinto	Nils Ušakovs
Party	AS	PRO	Harmony
Alliance	ECR	Greens/EFA	S&D
Last election	5.01%, 0 seats (Note: Includes the result of the only coalition member that run independently in 2019, LRA, while the other two were members of the ZZS coalition.)	2.91%, 0 seats	17.56%, 2 seats
Seats won	1	1	1
Seat change	New	▲1	▼1
Popular vote	42,551	38,752	37,096
Percentage	8.27%	7.53%	7.21%
Swing	New	▲4.62pp	▼10.35pp
	Seventh party
Leader	Vilis Krištopāns
Party	LPV
Alliance	Patriots
Last election	New
Seats won	1
Seat change	New
Popular vote	32,034
Percentage	6.23%
Swing	New
- Results by Saeima constituency

The 2024 European Parliament election in Latvia was held on 8 June 2024 as part of the 2024 European Parliament election. This was the fifth European Parliament election held in Latvia, and the first to take place after Brexit.

== Electoral system ==
Compared to the last election, Latvia was entitled to one more MEP assigned in 2023 after a pre-election assessment of the Parliament composition based on the most recent population figures. The 9 members are elected through open list proportional representation in a single nationwide constituency with seats allocated through Sainte-Laguë method and a 5% electoral threshold.

Both Latvian and EU citizens residing in the country are entitled to vote in the European elections in Latvia. No registration is needed for Latvian citizens, while other EU citizens residing in Latvia are required to register with the Central Electoral Commission. In addition, those eligible to vote must turn 18 years old by election day at the latest.

== Outgoing delegation ==
The table shows the detailed composition of the Latvian seats at the European Parliament as of 31 May 2024 prior to the election.

EP Group	Seats	Party	Seats	MEPs
European People's Party	2 / 8	Unity	2	Sandra Kalniete; Inese Vaidere
Progressive Alliance of Socialists and Democrats	2 / 8	Social Democratic Party "Harmony"	1	Nils Ušakovs
Progressive Alliance of Socialists and Democrats	2 / 8	Honor to serve Riga	1	Andris Ameriks
Renew Europe	2 / 8	For Latvia's Development	1	Ivars Ijabs
European Conservatives and Reformists	1 / 8	National Alliance	2	Roberts Zīle; Ansis Pūpols
Non-Inscrits	1 / 8	Latvian Russian Union	1	Tatjana Ždanoka
Total			8	
Source: European Parliament

=== Retiring incumbents ===
Name	Party	First elected	Terms	Date announced	Source
Andris Ameriks	Honor to serve Riga	2019	1	9 February 2024	
Tatjana Ždanoka (Note: Ineligible to run for reelection.)	Latvian Russian Union	2004	4	9 February 2024	

== Running parties ==
The following parties ran candidates in the 2024 EU Parliament election in Latvia.

Party		European Party	Group	2019 result	Top candidate
JV	New Unity	EPP	EPP	26.4	Valdis Dombrovskis
S	Social Democratic Party "Harmony"	PES	S&D	17.6	Nils Ušakovs
NA	National Alliance	ECR	ECR	16.5	Roberts Zīle
LA	For Latvia's Development	ALDE	RE	12.5	Ivars Ijabs
Par!	Movement For!	ALDE	RE	12.5	Ivanna Volochiy
ZZS	Union of Greens and Farmers	−	−	5.6 (Note: Includes the separate results of the ZZS coalition and of its member LSDSP, that run independently in 2019.)	Harijs Rokpelnis
AS	United List	−	−	5.0	Reinis Pozņaks
JKP	New Conservative Party	−	−	4.4	Tālis Linkaits
PRO	The Progressives	EGP	−	2.9	Elīna Pinto
TZV	People. Land. Country. (Note: Includes also Latvian Independence Movement (LNK) candidates.)	−	−	0.9	Aleksandrs Kiršteins
CP	Centre Party (Note: A joint list of Latvian Russian Union and Centre Party candidates)	−	−	0.5	Inna Djeri
TVS	Force of People's Power (Note: Includes also People's Servants for Latvia (TKL) candidates.)	−	−	0.2	Valentīns Jeremejevs
ST	For Stability!	−	−	−	Ņikita Piņins
LPV	Latvia First	−	−	−	Vilis Krištopans
SV	Sovereign Power (Note: Includes also United for Latvia (VL) candidates.)	ECPM	−	−	Julija Stepanenko
AJ	Alliance of Young Latvians	−	−	−	Rūdolfs Brēmanis

== Opinion polling ==
Graphical summary

Polling firm	Fieldwork date	Sample size	JV EPP	S S&D	NA ECR	LA Renew	Par! Renew	ZZS	AS	JKP	PRO G/EFA	TZV	CP	TVS	S!	LPV	SV	AJ	Lead
SKDS/LTV	March 2024	1.505	16.6 (1)	10.1 (1)	17.1 (2)	8.9 (1)	1.5	3.4	6.1 (1)	3.5	9.6 (1)	0.2	2.1	0.6	6.4 (1)	8.2 (1)	3.8	1.9	0.5
SKDS/LTV	10-14 February 2024	1,505	17.9 (2)	9.1 (1)	16.5 (1)	9.2 (1)	0.6	4.0	7.4 (1)	3.5	8.9 (1)	0.8	2.1	0.5	7.5 (1)	6.6 (1)	3.2	2.3	1.4
2019 election	25 May 2019	–	26.4 (2)	17.6 (2)	16.5 (2)	12.5 (1)		5.6 (0)	5.0	4.4	2.9	0.9	6.8 (1) (Note: Latvian Russian Union: 6.3% (1); Centre Party: 0.5%)	0.2					8.7

== Results ==
Party	Votes	%	Seats	+/–
New Unity	130,563	25.37	2	0
National Alliance	114,858	22.32	2	0
For Latvia's Development	48,696	9.46	1	0
United List	42,551	8.27	1	New
The Progressives	38,752	7.53	1	+1
Social Democratic Party "Harmony"	37,096	7.21	1	–1
Latvia First	32,034	6.23	1	New
Sovereign Power	13,623	2.65	0	New
Union of Greens and Farmers	11,852	2.30	0	0
Alliance of Young Latvians	11,067	2.15	0	New
For Stability!	10,307	2.00	0	New
Centre Party	8,925	1.73	0	0
New Conservative Party	7,799	1.52	0	0
People. Land. Country.	3,017	0.59	0	New
Force of People's Power	1,779	0.35	0	0
Movement For!	1,666	0.32	0	0
Total	514,585	100.00	9	+1
Valid votes	514,585	98.73		
Invalid/blank votes	6,641	1.27		
Total votes	521,226	100.00		
Registered voters/turnout	1,541,102	33.82		
Source: CVK

=== European groups ===
Party	Seats	+/–
European Conservatives and Reformists Group	3	+1
European People's Party Group	2	0
Renew Europe	1	0
Greens–European Free Alliance	1	0
Progressive Alliance of Socialists and Democrats	1	–1
Patriots for Europe	1	New
Total	9	+1

== Elected MEPs ==
Elected MEPs
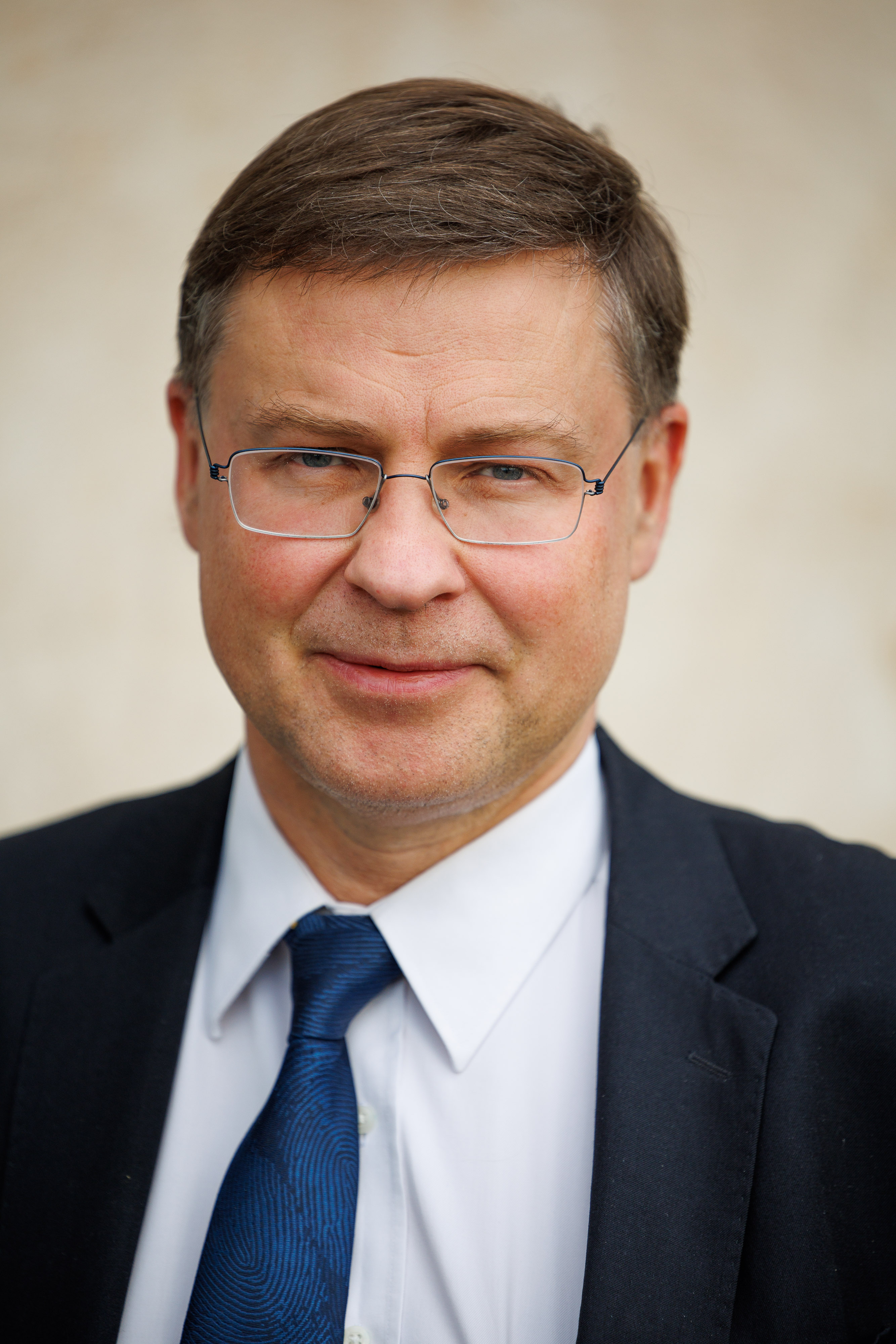
Valdis Dombrovskis (JV)

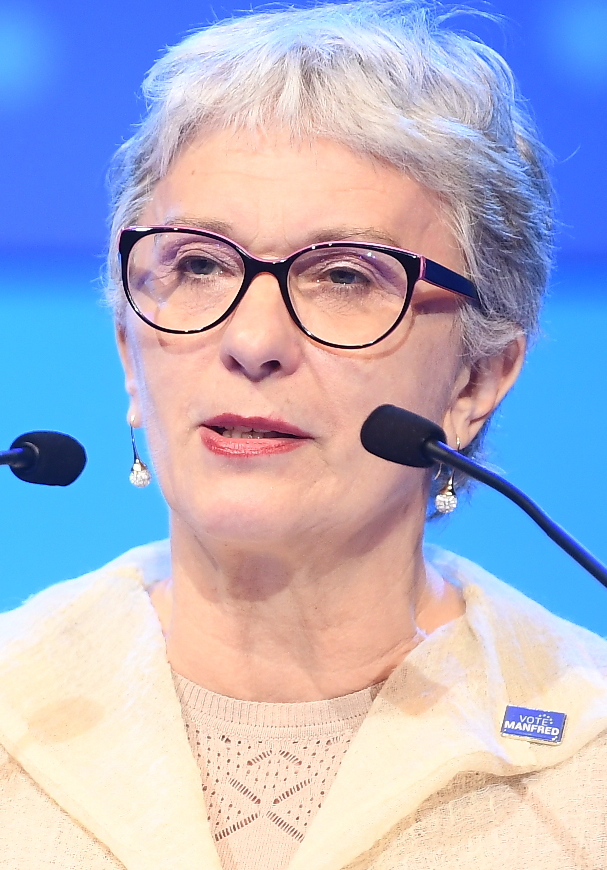
Sandra Kalniete (JV)

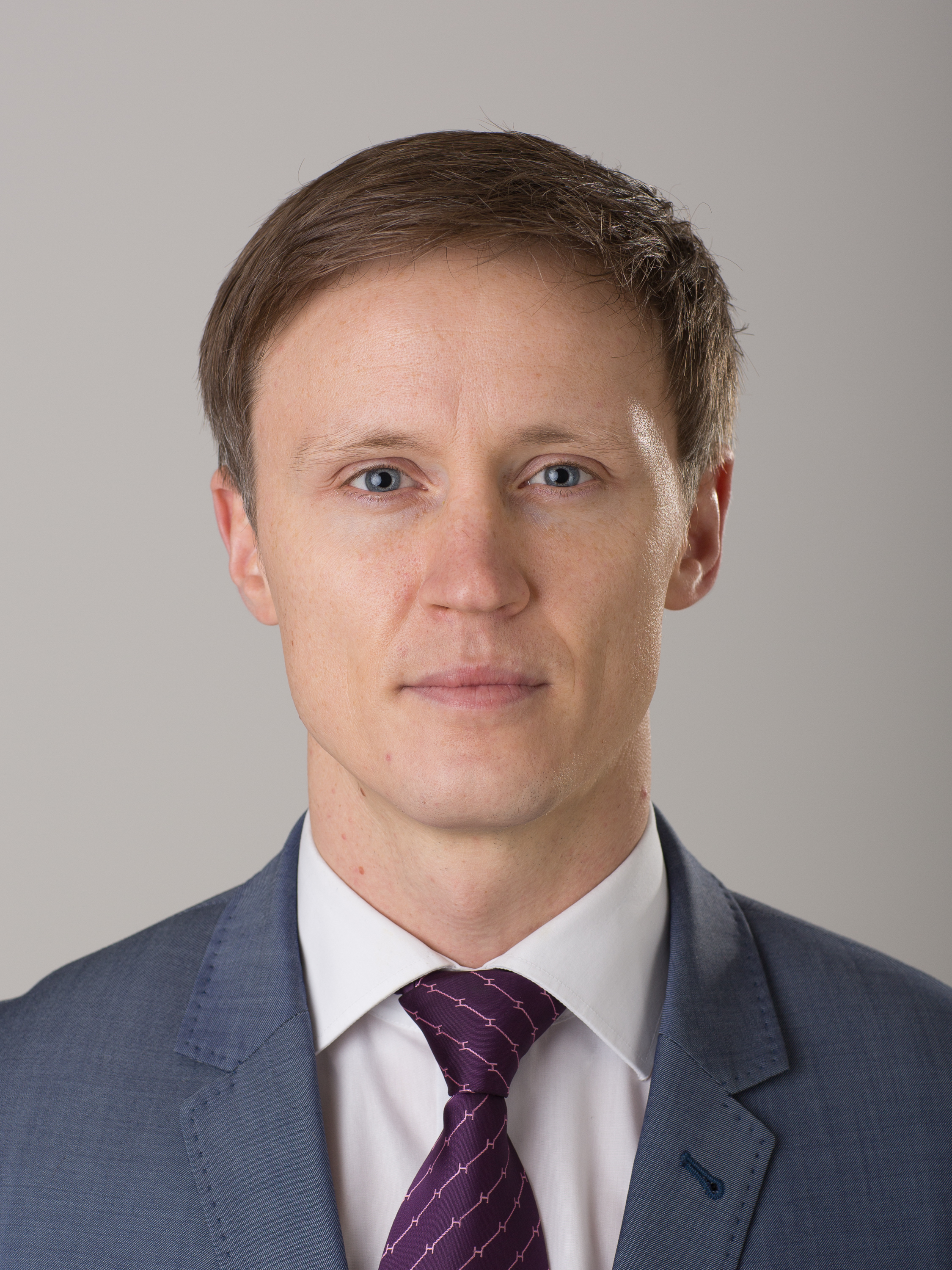
Rihards Kols (NA)

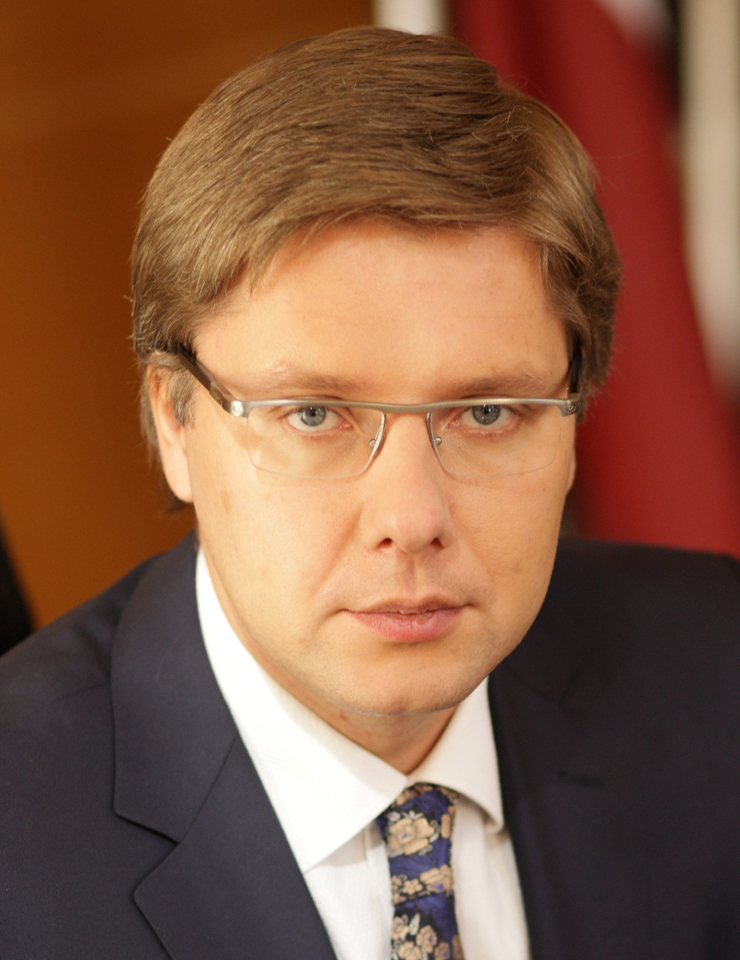
Nils Ušakovs (S)

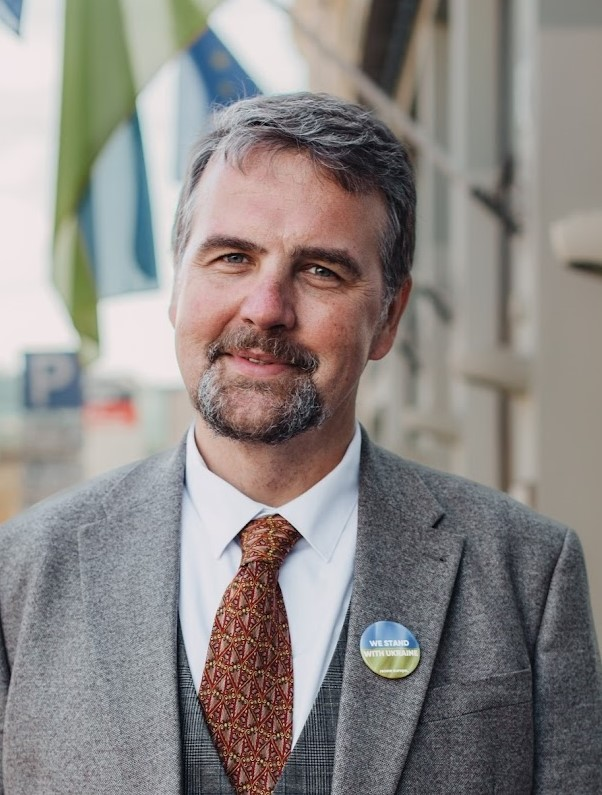
Ivars Ijabs (LA)

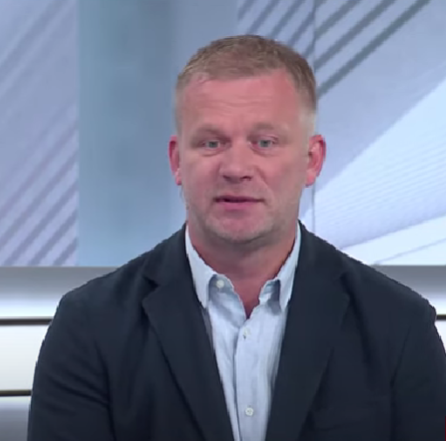
Reinis Pozņaks (AS)

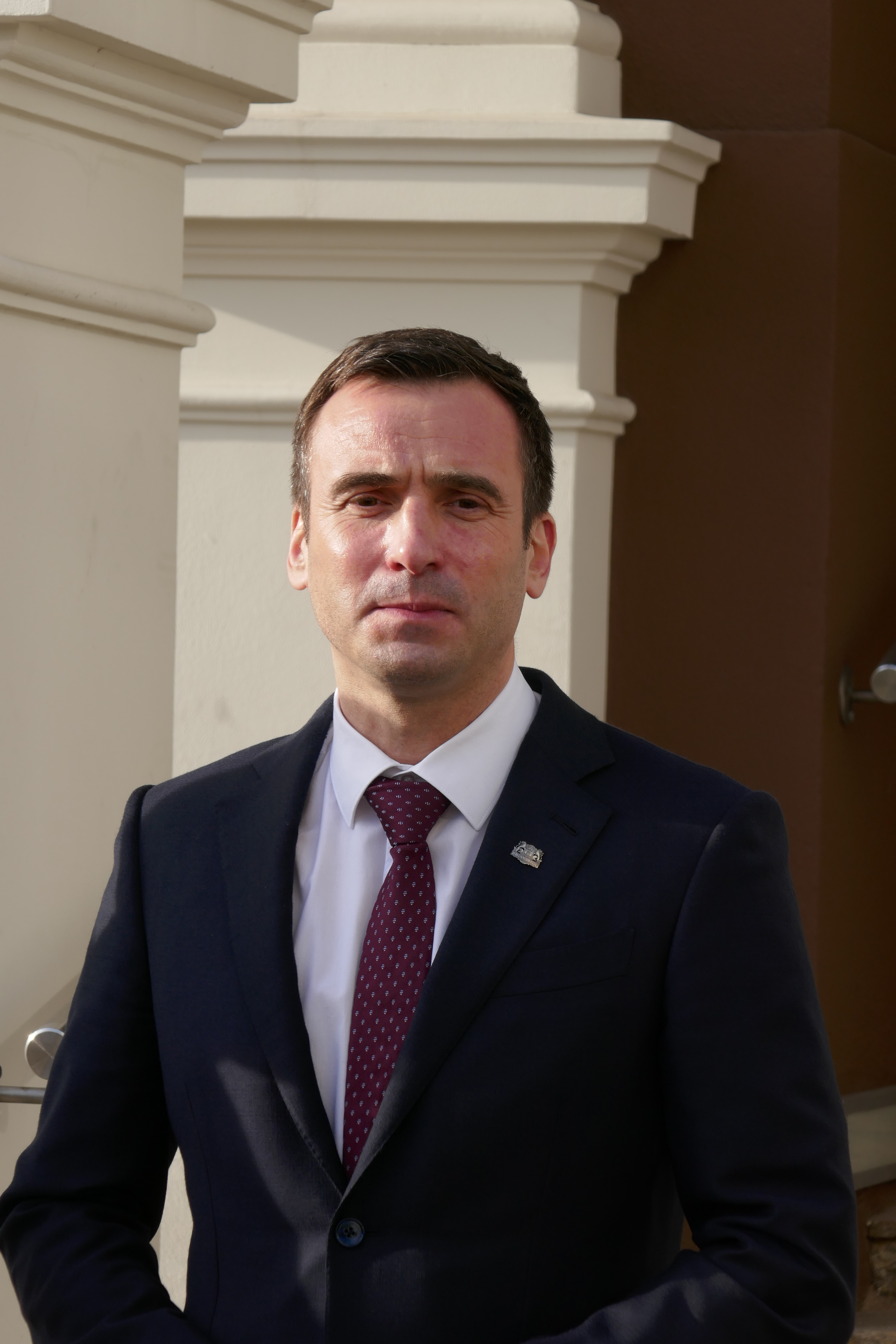
Mārtiņš Staķis (PRO)

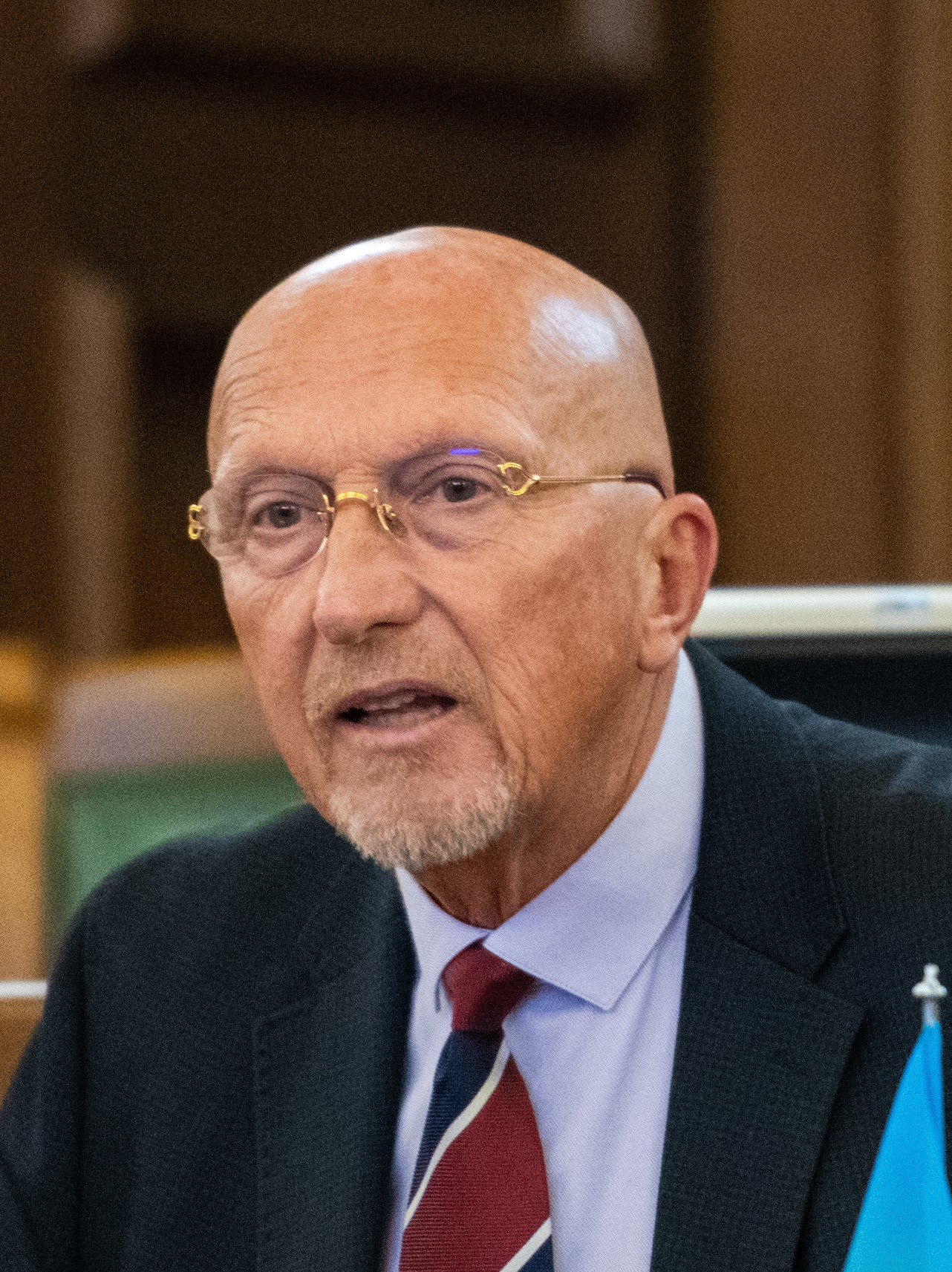
Vilis Krištopans (LPV)
