= Force of People's Power =

Force of People's Power Tautas varas spēks
- Abbreviation: TVS
- Leader: Valentīns Jeremejevs
- Founded: 18 April 2007
- Headquarters: Riga, Latvia
- Membership (2024): 535 ▲
- Ideology: Russian minority politics Populism; Originally: Conservative populism
- Political position: Right-wing
- Colors: Maroon; White

Website
- tautasvarasspeks.lv

Force of People's Power (Latvian: Tautas varas spēks) is a minor conservative populist Latvian political party founded in 2007 under the name Force in Unity (Spēks vienotībā) which operated under the name Alternative from 2012 to 2022.

== History ==
In the 2009 Latvian municipal elections in Aglona Municipality, the party won a seat in the municipal council. It did not stand for reelection in 2013.

In the run-up to the 2014 European elections, then-MEP Aleksandrs Mirskis renamed the Strength in Unity party to Alternative in 2013, becoming its leader, but was not elected to the European Parliament.

Also in the 2017 municipal elections, the party did not win voter support and in the 2020 Riga City Council snap elections the party did not reach the 5% threshold. The list included Valērijs Petrovs (as the candidate for mayor), Aleksejs Rosļikovs, Vitālijs Dubovs, Jefimijs Klementjevs, Jevgenijs Jevstifejevs, Svetlana Čulkova, Agris Sūna, Amils Saļimovs, Rolands Pogulis, Mihails Tjurins, Kirils Haritonovs, Andrejs Daņiļevičs, Andrejs Pokumeiko, Aleksandrs Šileinikovs, Nikolajs Grebņovs, Nataļja Marčenko-Jodko, Ronalds Pedāns, Jevgenijs Trigubko, Linda Livčāne, Nataļja Nikuļina, Aleksandrs Mirskis, Natālija Sproģe, Igors Karazejevs, Valērijs Dombrovskis, Kristīna Linova, Rihards Romušs, Poļina Rožkova, Pēteris Jefimovs, Andris Gūtmanis, Valentīna Kudrjašova, Vitālijs Porsevs, Viktorija Jarkina, Sergejs Volodins and others.

On October 11, 2020, several members of the party registered a new NGO called Yes to Stability! (Stabilitātei- Jā!). On 17 January 2021, Aleksejs Rosļikovs and Valērijs Petrovs became chairman and co-chairman of the newly founded party For Stability!.

Controversial ex-Latvian Green Party politician and fringe activist Valentīns Jeremejevs took over the leadership of the Alternative party in May 2022, who transformed it into the party Force of People's Power. It did not enter the Saeima. After the election results were announced, Jeremejevs challenged the results by submitting complaints to the Central Election Commission, but the complaint was unsuccessful.

== Elections ==
=== European ===
Year	Election	Vote share	Seats gained
2014	8. EP election	3,73	0 / 8
2024	10. EP election	0,34	0 / 9

=== Saeima elections ===
Year	Election	Vote share	Seats gained
2022	14. Saeima election	1,13	0 / 100
