= Glorija Grevcova =

Latvian politician

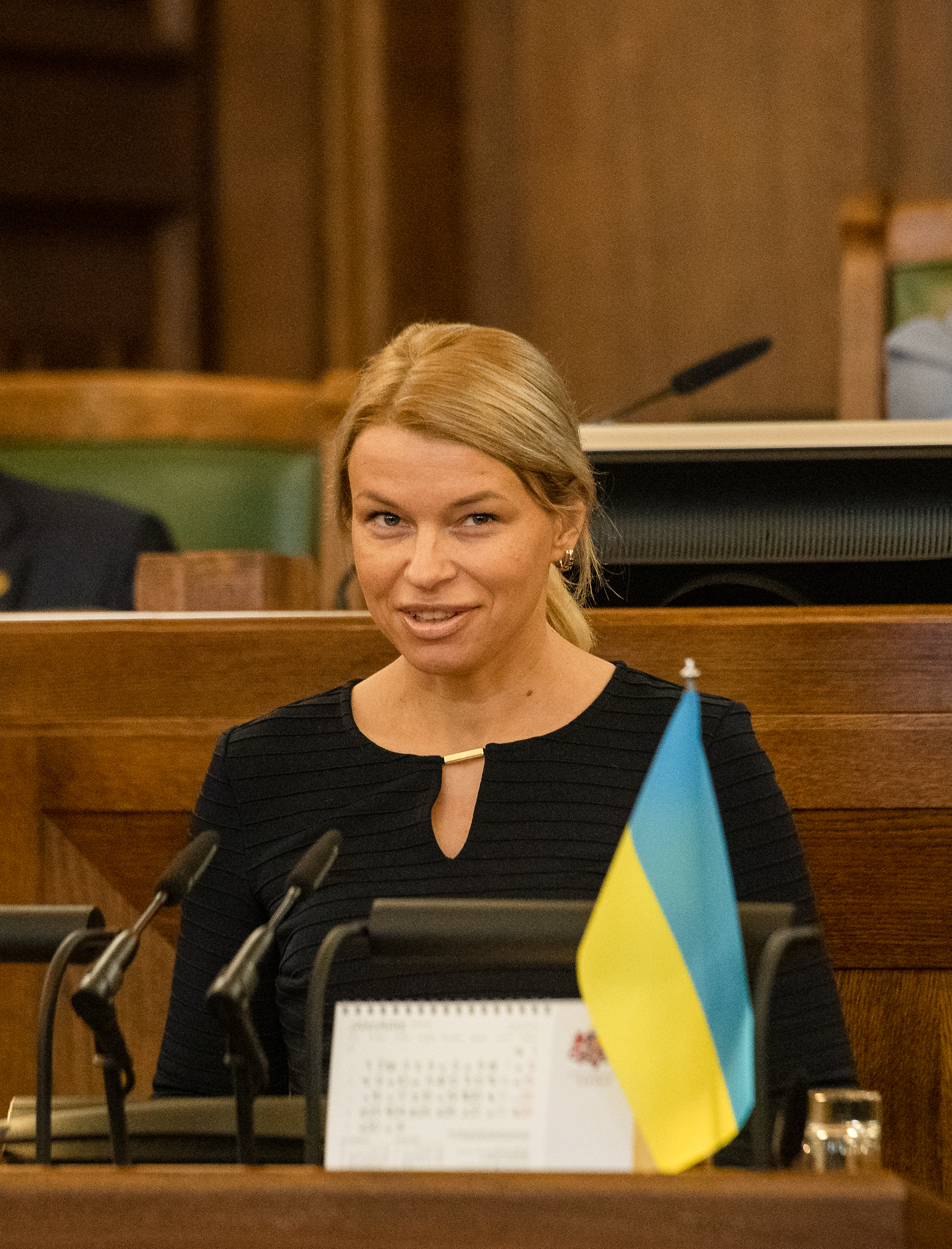

Member of the 14th Saeima
- In office 1 November 2022 – 15 February 2024
- Succeeded by: Amils Saļimovs

Personal details
- Born: Glorija Kozlovska; May 29, 1988 (age 37)
- Party: AJ (2023–present)
- Other political affiliations: S! (2022–2023)
- Occupation: Politician

Glorija Grevcova (born Glorija Kozlovska; 29 May 1988) is a Latvian politician. She was elected to the 14th Saeima in 2022 as a member of For Stability! from which she later switched to the Alliance of Young Latvians.

== Biography ==
She received her education at Rekava Secondary School in Šķilbēni Parish of Balvi Municipality, graduating in 2008. She is a former track and field athlete and long-distance runner.

For a short time around 2013, G. Grevcova worked in the woodworking company "Dolo" Ltd. in Šķilbēni Parish as an auxiliary worker (wood stacker).

She was married to Kaspars Grevcovs and Edgars Tams (a son was born to this marriage).

=== Political career ===
In the autumn 2022 elections to the 14th Saeima, Grevcova was elected to the 14th Saeima from the party For Stability! list. Criminal proceedings have been initiated against Grevcova for providing false information to the Central Election Commission (data on education and place of work).

In March 2023, Grevcova announced her withdrawal from For Stability!. Later, she joined the Alliance of Young Latvians, among whose founders is the controversial former diplomat Rūdolfs Brēmanis, with whom Grevcova has close relations and has been often seen together in public. Brēmanis, a former charge- d'affaires at the Latvian embassy in the United Arab Emirates, is the main suspect in case about a possible embezzlement scheme involving the service apartments of the foreign service.

=== Criminal proceedings ===
Shortly after the Saeima elections, criminal proceedings were initiated against Grevcova for providing false information to the Central Electoral Commission. The declaration states that before her election to the Saeima, she worked as an advisor at SIA "Dolo", which the company's representative denies, claiming that such a position never existed at the company. However, she admits that she did work there – as a support worker. After a departmental investigation, it was revealed that Glorija had also lied about her education at the Latvian Academy of Sport Education (LSPA) as a teacher.

The LSPA pointed out that Gloria was not on the list of graduates or students. The party leadership has repeatedly stated that there was a "clerical error" when the declaration was submitted and that they see no reason to deny her further participation in the Saeima once the data is updated.

In January 2023, the Saeima decided to authorise the continuation of the prosecution of Grevcova. In March, the court of first instance decided to punish the MP with 160 hours of community service.

On 23 January 2023, Grevcova posted a video on her TikTok account in which she called the exhibition of the Museum of the Occupation of Latvia "propaganda". On the same day, Edmunds Jurēvics, a Member of the Saeima, filed a petition with the Prosecutor General for a possible violation of Article 74.1 of the Criminal Code "Justification of genocide, crime against humanity, crime against peace and war crimes". On 30 January, criminal proceedings were opened against the MP in this case as well. In February 2023, Grevcova was excluded from participating in the next six sessions of the Saeima for violating the Saeima Code of Ethics. When the verdict came into force on 15 February 2024, Grevtsova lost her seat as a deputy and was replaced by Azerbaijani businessman Amil Salimov.

On 3 April 2024, Grevtsova was indicted and declared wanted for justifying war crimes and inciting national hatred.
