= For Stability! =

Latvian political party

For Stability! Stabilitātei!
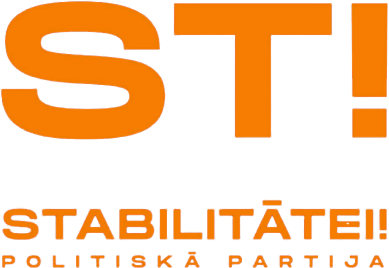
- Abbreviation: ST!
- Leader: Jefimijs Klementjevs
- Founders: Aleksejs Rosļikovs; Valērijs Petrovs
- Founded: 26 February 2021
- Split from: Harmony; Alternative
- Membership (2022): 701▲
- Ideology: Populism; Russian minority politics Euroscepticism
- Political position: Centre
- Colours: Orange
- Slogan: "Stabilitātei - jā!" ("Yes to Stability!")
- Saeima: 9 / 100
- European Parliament: 0 / 9

Website
- partijastabilitatei.lv

For Stability! (Latvian: Stabilitātei!; ST!) is a Latvian political party founded on 26 February 2021. It was founded by former members of the Social Democratic Party "Harmony" Aleksejs Rosļikovs and Valērijs Petrovs. It is a party that advocates Russian minority politics, and it describes itself as centrist on the political spectrum, whereas others have described it as both right-wing and left-leaning.

== History ==
=== Establishment (2021) ===
The "Yes to Stability!" (Stabilitātei - jā!) group was founded in the winter of 2021. It was founded by two former Riga councilors elected from the list of the Social Democratic Party "Harmony": Aleksejs Rosļikovs and Valērijs Petrovs. In the early 2020 Riga City Council election, both councilors stood on the list of the Alternative party, which did not win seats in the council. At the end of the ten days set aside for collecting signatures, a total of 315 people participated in the founding of the party. At the time of its founding, the party had 647 members. The party's establishment was voted unanimously, and the party was officially founded on 26 February 2021.

The group's leaders emphasized that they would build a political party free of sponsors, which would contribute to the stabilization of the state as its main task. They also announced that they would run in the local elections in 2021. They chose Law and Order and the Republic as the closest groups.

In 2021, the party organized multiple protests against mandatory vaccination and restrictions related to the COVID-19 pandemic.

=== 13th Saeima (2022–2026) ===
The party ran in the 2022 Latvian parliamentary election. It named Aleksejs Rosļikovs as the candidate for prime minister. Among others, it advocated for leaving the European Union, developing a sovereign economic policy, and direct presidential elections. Its programme also called for reforms to taxation and the education system. Additionally, it supported extending voting rights to non-citizens and has proposed prosecuting current and former politicians over their handling of the COVID-19 pandemic, without speciying the legal mechanisms. The party promoted significant changes to the state's governance and electoral system and positioned itself as more radical than the Harmony party in pursuing what it saw as the restoration of Latvian independence.

The party gained 62,168 or 6.8% of the votes, which gave them 11 seats in the 14th Saeima filled by Aleksejs Rosļikovs, Svetlana Čulkova, Glorija Grevcova, Iļja Ivanovs, Igors Judins, Jefimijs Klementjevs, Dmitrijs Kovaļenko, Nataļja Marčenko-Jodko, Viktorija Pleškāne, Viktors Pučka and Nadežda Tretjakova. The party's election performance was described by Public Broadcasting of Latvia as, perhaps, "the most spectacular success of the night" pointing to its seeming success in attracting a large numer of previous Harmony voters. On 2 November, 2022, less than an hour after giving the Saeima member oath, MP Nadežda Tretjakova renounced her parliamentary mandate due to "unexpected family conditions" and was replaced by Jekaterina Dorošķeviča.

On 20 December 2022, The State Security Service issued a warning to the party over statements made by its members Aleksejs Rosļikovs and Glorija Grevcova to Russian and Belarusian propaganda outlets, saying such actions may violate Latvia's Law on Political Parties and could lead to legal action, including possible termination of the party's activities.

On 17 March 2023 Saeima deputy Glorija Grevcova who was convicted of providing false information about her education and work history to the Central Election Commission left the "For Stability!" party and its Saeima faction. After her appeal to the Supreme Court was rejected, Grevcova was subsequently expelled from the Saeima on 15 February 2024 and replaced by Amils Saļimovs on February 22.

In July 2024, Riga City Council member Yakov Pliner who had left Latvian Russian Union in 2022 and long-time "Harmony" politician Nikolai Kabanov joined "For Stability!".

On 2 July 2025, "For Stability!" MPs were denied an excused absence from a 5 June Saeima sitting after leaving the chamber in protest following leader Aleksejs Rosļikovs' expulsion for offensive and aggressive behaviour, and had 20% of their monthly salary deducted. The MPs said their presence was no longer possible "due to a lack of respect for opposition representatives and psychological pressure," while Speaker of the Saeima Daiga Mieriņa argued they had shirked their duties and backed Rosļikovs' "disrespect for the Latvian state, its citizens and the Saeima," calling it "unjustifiable."

Six of the "For Stability!" MPs have been invited for Latvian language tests by the Latvian State Language Center, a move the party's leader Rosļikovs called a "politically committed affair." Two of the MPs attended and passed the language tests, Nataļja Marčenko-Jodko and Dmitrijs Kovaļenko didn't attend, were fined, appealed the fine and lost the appeal, while Jefimijs Klementjevs and Viktors Pučka were fined either for insufficient use of the national language or failing to comply with official requests and paid the fines.

On 12 August 2025, MP Viktors Pučka resigned and on 4 September was replaced by Jeļena Kļaviņa who immediately left the party's faction due to differing views and the faction's working style, as did MP Jekaterina Drelinga. Chairwoman of the "For Stability!" faction Svetlana Čulkova attributed their departure to the "unprecedented pressure" on the party from both the security services and the political environment. On 14 August 2025, Riga City Council member Mairis Briedis left the political faction.

On 10 February 2026, MPs Iļja Ivanovs, Igors Judins, and Amils Saļimovs left the party, reducing its Saeima faction to five members from the original 11. On 18 February, MP Dmitrijs Kovaļenko also left, which resulted in the disbanding of the "For Stability!" parliamentary faction.

== Ideology ==
The party advocates Latvia's withdrawal from the European Union, the pursuit of an independent economic policy, and the development of "independent relations with neighboring countries" in order to strengthen national sovereignty. It supports the direct election of the president and extending voting rights to non-citizens, arguing that this would help eliminate "ethnic voting". The party also proposes changes to taxation, education, and pension policy. It has called for the prosecution of politicians over their handling of the COVID-19 pandemic, accusing them of "using the COVID-19 pandemic as a tool for segregation [...] and destroying health by carrying out forced vaccinations and denying the right to receive urgent medical care", although it does not specify how such prosecutions would be achieved legally.

The party argues for a reduction in the size of government, including halving the number of Saeima representatives and consolidating ministries. It advocates lower taxes and reform of the State Revenue Service. It opposes Latvia paying EU debt and purchasing electricity at "inflated European prices". The party also supports raising the birth rate through increased support for families, including a €1,000 benefit at birth, advocates canceling school reform, supports education in first languages, and favors a majoritarian electoral scheme instead of a partisan one.

== Election results ==
=== Legislative elections ===
Election	Party leader	Performance					Rank	Government
Election	Party leader	Votes	%	± pp	Seats	+/–	Rank	Government
2022	Aleksejs Rosļikovs	62,168	6.88	New	11 / 100	New	5th	Opposition
2026	Aleksejs Rosļikovs	16,062	2.02	▼4.86	0 / 100	▼11	▼10th	Extra-parliamentary

=== European Parliament elections ===
Election	List leader	Votes	%	Seats	+/–	EP Group
2024	Ņikita Piņins	10,307	2.00 (#11)	0 / 9	New	–

== Logo ==
The party's logo and initial abbreviation was the letter S with an exclamation point. The choice of the logo received a lot of criticism, especially in Sigulda, for the similarity of the logo with Sigulda's trademark "S!gulda aizrauj". Since Sigulda's trademark is 12 years older than the party, the court decided to ban For Stability! from using the "S!" trademark in economic circulation, including in advertising and online, without permission of the municipality of Sigulda. Until December 2023, the party used the long version of the logo with the full name of the party before changing it to the current "ST!" one.

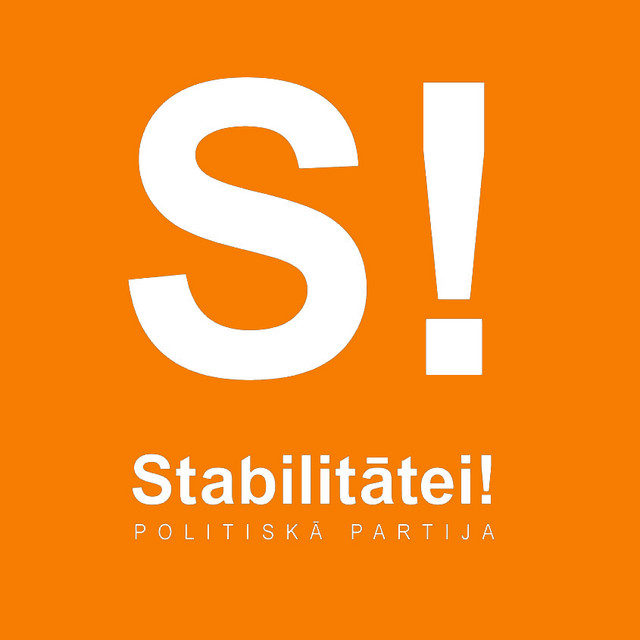
Short logo (2021—22)

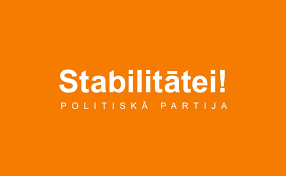
Long version (2021—23)
