= Ainārs Vilciņš =

Latvian politician

Thirteenth Saeima of Latvia
- President: Raimonds Vējonis; Egils Levits
- Premier: Krišjānis Kariņš

Personal details
- Born: April 21, 1966 (age 60) Ogre, Latvia
- Party: Sovereign Power
- Occupation: Politician

Ainārs Vilciņš (born 21 April 1966, Ogre, Latvia) is a Latvian politician, businessman, locksmith, skijoring player and a Member of the 13th Saeima (mandate confirmed due to the death of Aldis Blumbergs). He served on the Commission for Education, Culture and Science.

== Biography ==
Ainārs Vilciņš was elected to the 13th Saeima from the list of the political party For a Humane Latvia in the Vidzeme electoral district, after which he represented the Sovereign Power party. Ainārs Vilciņš has a secondary vocational education at the 32nd City Vocational Technical High School in Ogre in the profession of car locksmith and crane driver. Ainārs Vilciņš is engaged in business and is a board member of "Yourtime" Ltd, the association "L.A.M.A.", the Latvian Skijoring Federation.
