= Aleksejs Rosļikovs =

Latvian businessman and politician

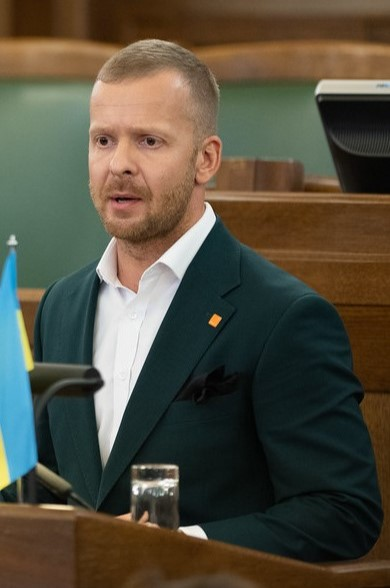
- Rosļikovs in 2022

Member of the Saeima
- In office 1 November 2022 – 10 June 2025

Riga City Council deputy
- In office 22 June 2017 – 2 October 2020

Personal details
- Born: February 26, 1984 (age 42)
- Other political affiliations: Social Democratic Party "Harmony" (before 2019); Alternative (2020–2021) For Stability! (since 2021)
- Education: Turība University
- Occupation: Politician, businessman

Aleksejs Rosļikovs (Russian: Алексей Росликов) (born 26 February 1984) is a Russian-Latvian businessman and politician, former Vice President of the Latvian United Police Union.

== Biography ==
From 2004 to 2005, he worked as an orderly, later an inspector, of the Riga regional administration of the State Police. In 2011, he graduated from the business management study program of Turība University.

In 2017, he was elected to the Riga City Council from the Saskaņa party, from which he was expelled in 2019. Until the dismissal of the city council in February 2020, together with Valērijs Petrovs, Vitālijs Dubovs and Vadims Baraņņiks, he worked in the faction of Independent deputies.

He ran for the 2020 Riga City Council election from the Alternative party, but was not elected. In 2021, together with Valērijs Petrovs, he founded the political party "For Stability!", from which list he was elected to the 14th Saeima.
