= Vjačeslavs Stepaņenko =

Latvian politician

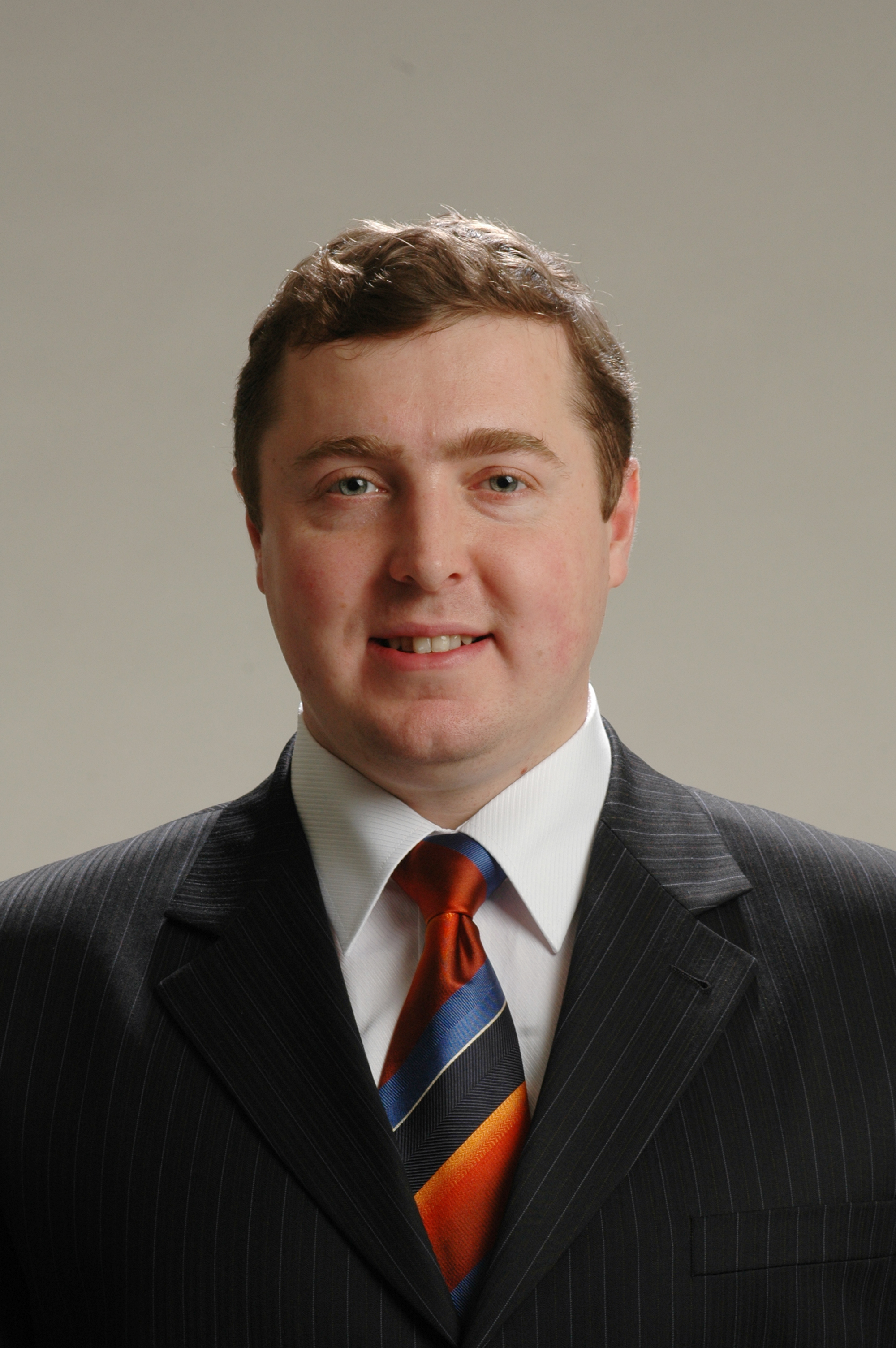
- Stepaņenko in 2004

Member of the Saeima
- Incumbent
- Assumed office 3 October 2026
- In office 5 November 2002 – 13 March 2008
- Constituency: Latgallia

Member of the Riga City Council
- Incumbent
- Assumed office 27 June 2025
- In office 1 July 2009 – 2 October 2020

Personal details
- Born: Vjačeslavs Stepaņenko; 8 August 1977 (age 49) Daugavpils, Latvian SSR, Soviet Union
- Citizenship: Latvia; Russia
- Party: SV (since 2022)
- Other political affiliations: ER (2002–2003); TSP (2003–2004); LPP (2004–2007); LPP/LC (2007–2011); GKR (2012–2020)
- Spouse: Julija Stepanenko (m. 2002)
- Children: 4
- Education: University of Latvia
- Occupation: Jurist • Politician

Vjačeslavs Stepaņenko (Russian: Вячесла́в Степане́нко; born 8 August 1977) is a Latvian politician and jurist.

Stepaņenko was a member of the parliament from 2002 to 2005, representing the parties "Par cilvēka tiesībām vienotā Latvijā" and Latvia's First Party. He was subsequently a member of the Latvia's First Party/Latvian Way (LPP/LC) from 2007 to 2011.

In 2022, Stepaņenko ran in the Latvian parliamentary elections as a candidate for the party Sovereign Power.
