= Sovereign Power (Latvia) =

Latvian populist political party

Sovereign Power Suverēnā vara
- Abbreviation: SV
- Leader: Jūlija Stepaņenko
- Founders: Jūlija Stepaņenko; Ļubova Švecova; Vjačeslavs Stepaņenko
- Founded: 4 July 2022 (as Sovereign Power)
- Registered: 24 January 2005 (as Latgale Heart Union)
- Split from: Latvia First (SV)
- Preceded by: Law.Responsibility.Order
- Headquarters: Rīga, Mazā Nometņu iela 44 - 6, LV-1002
- Ideology: Christian right Russian minority politics
- Political position: Right-wing
- Colours: Purple
- Slogan: «Sovereign power belongs to the people» (Latvian: «Suverēnā vara pieder tautai»)
- Saeima: 9 / 100 (9%)
- European Parliament: 0 / 9 (0%)

Website
- suverenavara.lv

Sovereign Power (Latvian: Suverēnā vara, SV) is a political party in Latvia, founded on 4 July 2022 by Jūlija Stepaņenko and Ļubova Švecova.

Before Stepanenko led the party, it was legally registered on 24 January 2005 first as Latgale Heart Union (Latvian: Savienība Latgales sirds) and then as Law.Responsibility.Order (Latvian: Likums.Atbildība.Kārtība).

The party had 3 seats in the 13th Saeima of Latvia: Jūlija Stepaņenko, Ļubova Švecova and Ainārs Vilciņš, officially sitting as independents. After taking part in the 2022 parliamentary election the party didn't win any seats, losing its parliamentary representation.

For the 2025 municipal elections, SV formed a coalition with the Alliance of Young Latvians party, with other parties including the Latvian Russian Union also being represented.

== Election results ==
=== Legislative elections ===
Election	Party leader	Performance					Rank	Government
Election	Party leader	Votes	%	± pp	Seats	+/–	Rank	Government
2022	Jūlija Stepaņenko	29,603	3.28	New	0 / 100	New	12th	Extra-parliamentary
2026 (Note: SV/AJ list won 15 seats; 9 to SV, 4 to AJ and 2 to LKS)	Jūlija Stepaņenko	94,211	11.87	▲8.59	9 / 100	▲9	▲6th	Opposition

=== European Parliament elections ===
Election	List leader	Votes	%	Seats	+/–	EP Group
2024	Julija Stepanenko	13,623	2.65 (#8)	0 / 9	New	–
