= Reinis Pozņaks =

Latvian politician (born 1977)

Reinis Pozņaks MEP
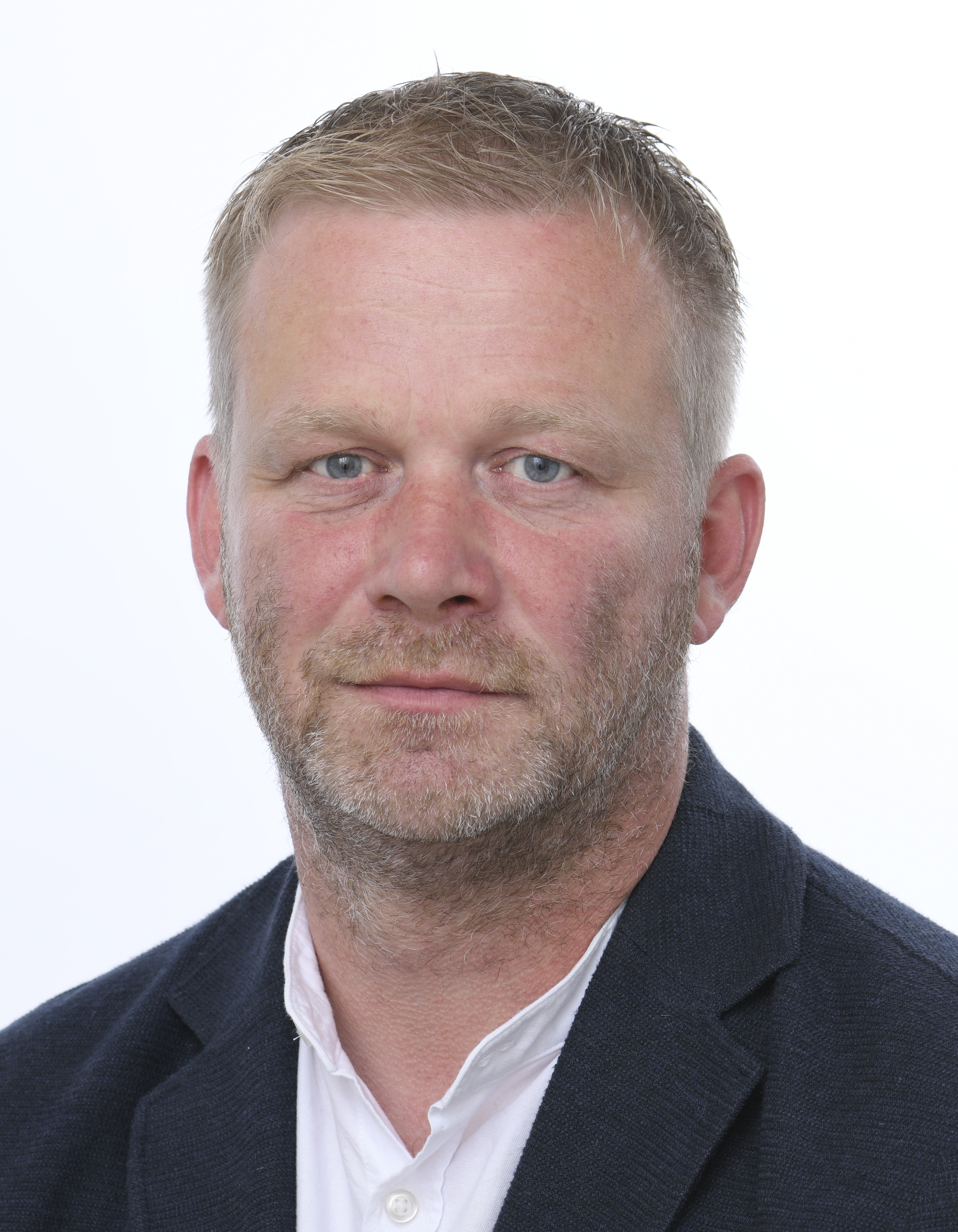
- Pozņaks in 2024

Member of the European Parliament for Latvia
- Incumbent
- Assumed office 16 July 2024

Personal details
- Born: 9 December 1977 (age 48)
- Party: United List
- Other political affiliations: European Conservatives and Reformists Party

Reinis Pozņaks (born 9 December 1977) is a Latvian politician of the United List who was elected as a member of the European Parliament in 2024. During the Russian invasion of Ukraine in 2022, he was a co-founder of the Twitter Convoy initiative to send vehicles to Ukraine.

== Awards and prizes ==
- Knight of the Order of the Three Stars (October 27, 2022)
- Order of Merit, 3rd class (January 22, 2026, Ukraine) – for significant personal contribution to strengthening interstate cooperation, supporting the sovereignty and territorial integrity of Ukraine, charitable activities, and promoting the Ukrainian state in the world
- European Person of the Year in Latvia
