= Alexander Mirsky =

Latvian politician (born 1964)

Aleksandrs Mirskis Alexander Tomasovich Mirsky
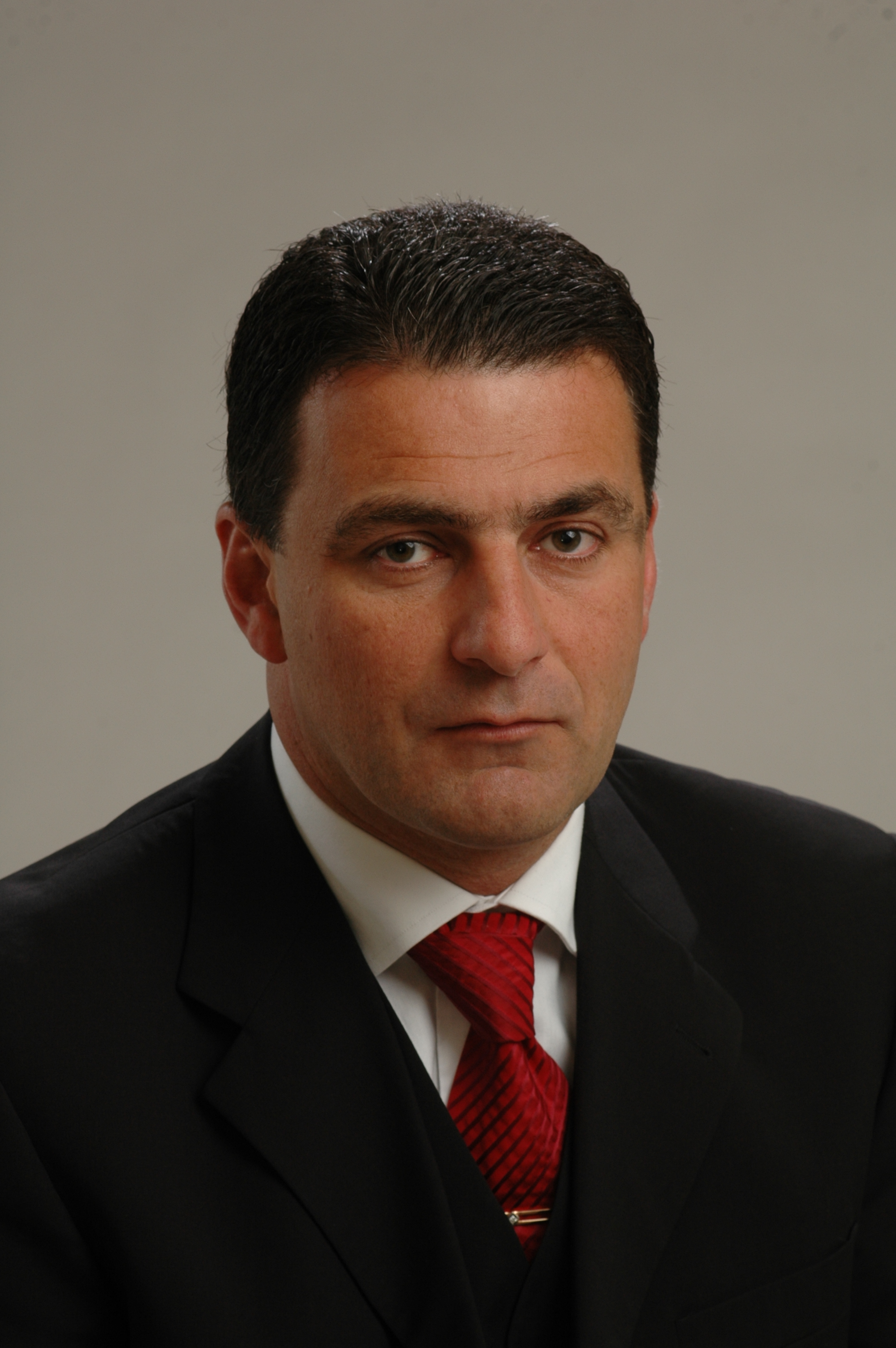
- Mirsky in 2004

Member of the European Parliament for Latvia
- In office July 2009 – July 2014

Personal details
- Born: 20 March 1964 (age 62) Vilnius, Lithuanian SSR, Soviet Union
- Party: National Harmony Party (2006–2010); Harmony (2010); Alternative (2012–present)
- Education: Kaunas Polytechnic Institute
- Profession: Civil engineer

Alexander Tomasovich Mirsky (Russian: Александр Томасович Мирский, Latvian: Aleksandrs Mirskis; born 20 March 1964) is a Latvian politician of Russian and Jewish descent.

== Biography ==
Mirsky was born on 20 March 1964, in Vilnius. In 1986, he graduated in civil engineering from the Kaunas Polytechnic Institute. He worked as a building project leader from 1986 to 1989 and from 1990 to 1992, taking a one year break for service in the Soviet Army as commander of a radiation reconnaissance unit. Upon ending his service, with the rank of first lieutenant, he resumed his work in construction.

In 1992, Mirsky was made a technical director and seven years later became the general manager of a construction company. He retired from business to become an adviser to the mayor of Riga Gundars Bojārs from 2001 until 2005, later being elected to the Saeima, the Latvian parliament 2006 until 2009.

From July 2009 to July 2014, he was 1 of 9 Latvian MEPs in the European Parliament, a member of the Harmony party elected as part of the Harmony Centre electoral alliance. He was affiliated with the Socialists and Democrats parliamentary group. Mirsky was a member of the Committee on Foreign Affairs and a substitute in the Committee on Regional Development. In 2014, he ran as a candidate of his own political party Alternative and was not re-elected at the European election.
