= Ļubova Švecova =

Latvian politician (born 1970)

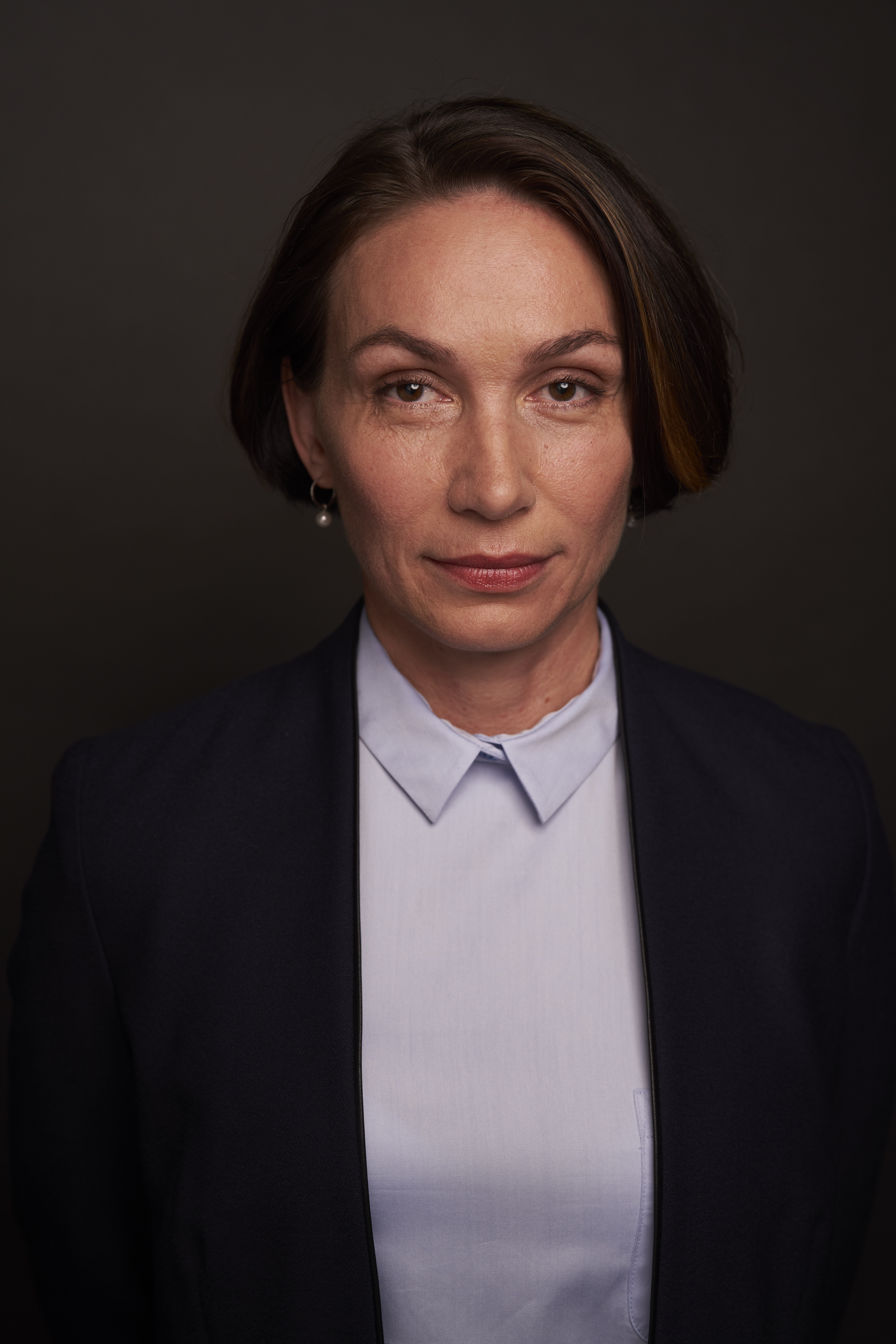
- Official portrait, 2018

Member of the Saeima
- Incumbent
- Assumed office 3 October 2026
- In office 6 November 2018 – 1 November 2022

Member of the Riga City Council
- Incumbent
- Assumed office 27 June 2025

Personal details
- Born: Ļubova Ananyevna Kirilova; 25 September 1970 (age 56) Ilūkste, Latvian SSR, Soviet Union
- Citizenship: Latvia; Russia
- Party: SV (since 2022)
- Other political affiliations: LSDSP (until 2018); Harmony (2018–2020); Independent (2020–2021); P21 (2021); LPV (2021–2022)
- Children: 2
- Education: University of Latvia
- Occupation: Lawyer • Politician

Ļubova Ananyevna Švecova (née Ļubova Ananyevna Kirilova; born 25 September 1970) is a Latvian-Russian lawyer and politician, who has held leading positions in the Financial Police Department of the State Revenue Service (SRS). She was a member of the 13th Saeima, elected from the list of the Social Democratic Party "Harmony". She was a member of the parties Platform 21 and Latvia First. She currently represents the Sovereign Power party and is a member of the Riga City Council.
