= Julija Stepanenko =

Latvian politician and lawyer

Julija Stepaņenko
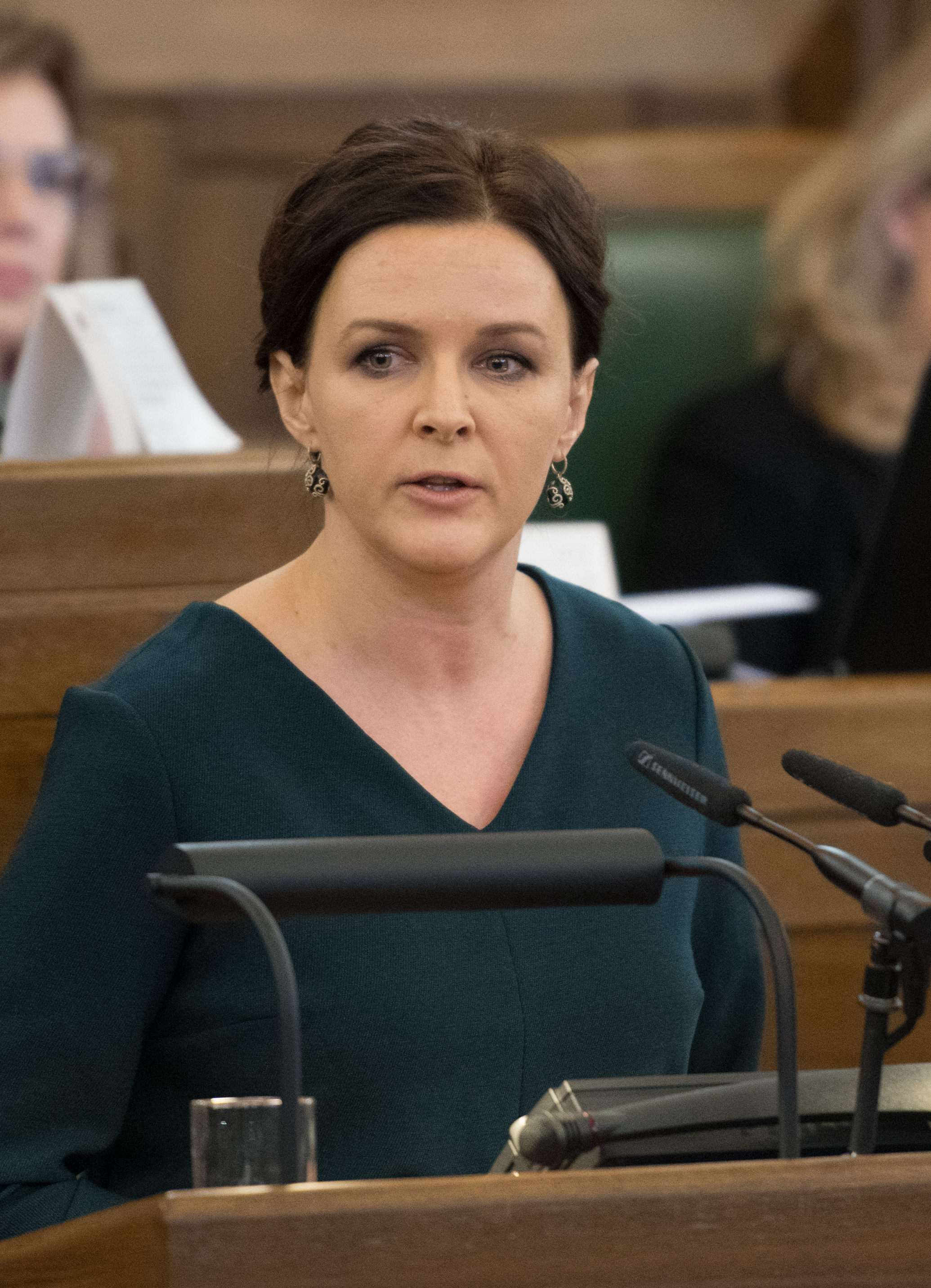
- Stepanenko in 2019

Member of the Saeima
- Incumbent
- Assumed office 3 October 2026
- In office 4 November 2014 – 1 November 2022

Member of the Riga City Council
- Incumbent
- Assumed office 27 June 2025

Personal details
- Born: Julija Sergeevna Fedotova; 1 September 1977 (age 49) Riga, Latvian SSR, Soviet Union
- Party: SV (since 2022)
- Other political affiliations: GKR (until 2020); P21 (2021); LPV (2021–2022)
- Spouse: Vjačeslavs Stepaņenko (m. 2002)
- Children: 4
- Education: University of Latvia
- Occupation: Jurist • Politician
- Website: julijastepanenko.lv/en

Julija Sergeevna Stepanenko (née Julija Sergeevna Fedotova; born 1 September 1977) is a Latvian politician and lawyer, serving as a deputy of the Saeima, the parliament of Latvia. Formerly a member of Honor to serve Riga and Law and Order, she is now a member of Sovereign Power, having left Law and Order in June 2021 and Latvia First in 2022.

== Political activity ==
Stepanenko firstly was elected to the Saeima in 2014. She served on the Saeima European Affairs Committee.

Stepanenko received more than 12,000 pluses and more than 90,000 votes at the 2018 Latvian parliamentary election and became one of the most supported representatives of the 13th Saeima. On the first day of the sitting of the 13th Saeima Stepanenko announced she would be leaving the Harmony parliamentary fraction and working as an independent deputy, however, she stated that she would continue to work with the party in matters that do not conflict with her own values. Stepanenko started serving in the Legal, European Affairs and Sustainable Development committees.

In January 2021 she co-founded the right-wing populist Law and Order party and was chosen to co-lead the party alongside fellow MP Aldis Gobzems until she left the party on 30 June 2021, criticising Gobzems' offensive style of communication. In August 2021 she was among the co-founders of the Latvia First party, being chosen as the party's board chair as well as their candidate for President of Latvia.

From 15 November 2021, Julija Stepanenko was one of the four Saeima deputies to be barred from parliament sittings by a special law prohibiting elected representatives without a COVID-19 certificate to take part in the discussion both in-person and remotely. She believed that this decision of the parliamentary majority is deeply undemocratic and shows that under the banner of fighting against COVID-19 things have gone thoroughly astray.

After the beginning of Full-scale Russian invasion of Ukraine, in March 2022 Stepanenko was removed from the Latvia First party for refusing to condemn the war.
