= Tomasz Szmydt =

Polish jurist

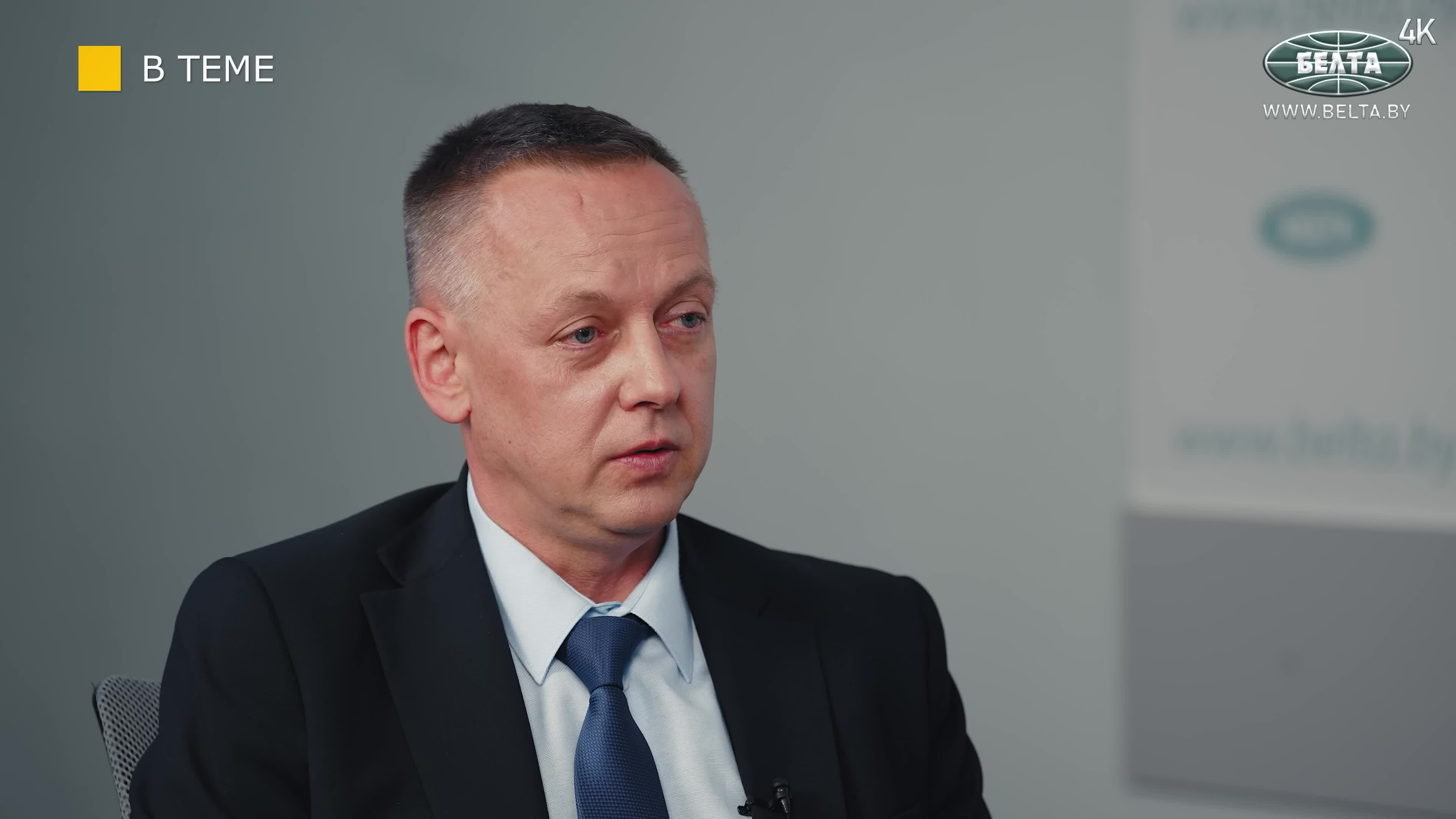
Tomasz Szmydt, 2024, Belarusian propaganda channel BelTA

Tomasz Szmydt (Polish pronunciation: ['tɔmaʂ 'ʂmɨt]; born 27 April 1970 in Białystok, eastern Poland) is a former Polish jurist, employed as a judge in the Regional Administrative Court in Warsaw. He adjudicated in the law court's second department on access to classified information in regard of members of the Polish military and intelligence.

On 1 May 2024, via Turkey, he defected to Belarus, where he applied for political asylum to 'temporarily rest [...] in an open and friendly country.' The judge most likely was extracted from Poland by the Belarusian security forces. Szmydt would have rather defected to Russia, but due to the short-visit visa waiver for Polish citizens to enter Belarus, he chose the latter country to avoid raising the Polish Foreign Intelligence Agency's suspicions. On 6 May 2024, the Belarusian state-owned governmental news agency BelTA held a press conference in Minsk, during which Szmydt praised the Belarusian authorities, proposing that Belarus is 'a country with great potential,' headed by 'a very wise leader.' Alexander Lukashenko, the President of Belarus, reciprocated; dubbing the fugitive judge 'a brave man' Szmydt later explained that he fled to Belarus to 'protest to the Polish authorities who under the influence of the US and the UK are leading the country to war.'

At this conference, Szmydt presented his signed letter of resignation from the post of a judge in the Regional Administrative Court in Warsaw. The Regional Court announced that they were unaware of this letter, while Szmydt was on his annual leave through 10 May 2024. On 7 May 2024, the Regional Court initiated disciplinary proceedings regarding the judge's case. In reply to the request lodged by National Public Prosecutor's Office (Prokuratura Krajowa), on 9 May 2024, the Supreme Administrative Court of Poland waived the judge's immunity. Furthermore, the Supreme Administrative Court also accepted the judge's public resignation. As a result, Szmydt ceased being a judge.

== Reactions ==
The unprecedented situation is assessed in Poland by the authorities and mass media as treason. Szmydt is lambasted as a 'traitor.' The Polish Minister of Foreign Affairs Radosław Sikorski and Poland's National Security Bureau (BBN) chief Jacek Siewiera consent, the strong suspicion being that this defection is already used for the sake of Russia's hybrid warfare against the West. This suspicion rests on Szmydt's appeal to Polish politicians that they should 'resume dialog with [Belarusian] President Lukashenko and Russia.' The Kremlin's leading propagandist Vladimir Solovyov also invited Szmydt to his primetime program, in which the judge participated twice. Apart from facing potential criminal charges, recently Szmydt was deciding on state functionaries' access to top secret NATO and EU documents. Now Szmydt hopes to meet President Lukashenko in person and work as a politician or geopolitical analyst in Belarus. Meanwhile, it transpired that the judge had sojourned in Belarus in June 2023 evoking no reaction on the part of the Polish counterintelligence. Even more worryingly, between 2019 and 2023, Szmydt sojourned in Ukraine 'tens of times' with no official oversight or explanation.

After the initial shock, the reactions in Poland resulted in further polarization of the political scene. Accusations are traded between the current pro-democratic government and the formerly ruling Law and Justice party (now in opposition) on who is responsible for Szmydt's recruitment to provide intelligence to Russia and Belarus. It is one of effects that the Russian propaganda seeks to achieve in a targeted democratic country, namely, 'exacerbating polarisation,' with an eye to 'undermine democracy.'

=== Russian and Belarusian propaganda coverage ===
As reported by the propaganda-led Russian and Belarusian mass media, on 7 May 2024, Szmydt changed the presumable cause of his defection, citing the danger of 'physical liquidation' in Poland. A day later, he added that upon return to Poland he would be incarcerated on trumped up changes, or would be assassinated in a staged motoring accident or suicide. Hence, Szmydt also asked for the Belarusian president's protection, which should also be extended over his relatives, who remain in Poland. Furthermore, Szmydt requested the Belarusian authorities to deliver to the Polish Ambassy in Minsk his letter of resignation from the law court in Warsaw. In line with the Russian propaganda's typical modus operandi, the presumed causes of Szmydt's defection are multiplied. Among others, it is proposed, the judge was persecuted for 'telling the truth to power,' that an official probe into his spying for Belarus was imminent, which could result in incarceration, that he maintained 'our Slavic peoples can live in harmony', that he 'refused to hate the Russians,' or that he was compelled to adjudicate in 'breach of his civic conscience.'

After discussing the 'causes' of his defection, the Minsk and Moscow propagandists began extracting from Szmydt normative judgements about Poland. The judge proposed that 'the Polish authorities behave abnormally,' 'Poland is not an independent country,' or that 'Polish politicians politicians represent the interests of the United States and the United Kingdom.' He also agreed that Poland's political system is similar to that of Nazi Germany, and stated that it is more authoritarian than what is observed in Belarus and Russia.

Subsequently, the Belarusian and Russian propaganda began stylizing Szmydt as a 'dissident.' On 8 May 2024, Szmydt gave an interview to the Belarusian branch of Russia's propaganda Sputnik news agency, wearing on the lapel a large ribbon of Saint George, or the present-day Kremlin's preferred symbol of Russian militarism ('patriotism'), imperialism and the ongoing war against Ukraine. On the other hand, he announced that the Polish population at large 'do not want to fight against Russia, Belarus or Ukraine.' In this context, it is not surprising that on 9 May 2024, Szmydt 'revealed' he was sure that the Polish authorities were getting ready to send to Belarus assassins with the task of liquidating the judge. Yet, it is the Russian government's preferred method of 'dealing' with opponents and defectors. But to lend some credibility to Szmydt's claim, Lukashenko personally assigned a security detail to the fugitive judge. The Belarusian president also promised to consider Szmydt's application for political asylum in Belarus.

On 9 May 2024, that is, the Victory Day (or the most important state holiday in Russia and Belarus), this propaganda coverage reached crescendo. Lukashenko devoted much of his speech to Szmydt. The Belarusian president claimed that Szmydt is not a Belarusian (or Russian) agent but a Polish 'patriot,' who 'tells the truth about what is going on in Poland.' Lukashenko added that Russian President Vladimir Putin expressed interest in the case of this fugitive judge from Poland.

On 3 May 2024, a Telegram channel was created by or on behalf of Tomasz Szmydt. Three days later, it began posting intensively propaganda messages. On 13 May 2024, articles on Szmydt were posted on the Belarusian and Russian Wikipedias, in which he is identified above all as a 'Polish dissident, though nothing is known on the judge's dissident activities prior to his defection to Belarus.

== Biography ==
In 1996 Tomasz Szmydt graduated with a degree in law from the Białystok branch of the University of Warsaw. He began his work as a jurist in the County Court (Sąd rejonowy) in Ciechanów, where he was nominated to the post of a judge (sędzia) in 2001. In 2009 he was to the post of a judge in the District Court (Sąd okręgowy) in Płock. In 2011, Szmydt continued his career as a judge in the Regional Administrative Court in Warsaw. On 8 May 2017, the judge was seconded to the Polish Ministry of Justice. When this secondment came to an end, Deputy Minister of Justice Łukasz Piebiak prolonged it and sent Szmydt to join the National Council of the Judiciary. Szmydt speaks native-level Russian.

The mass media remind that Szmydt's defection to Belarus is similar to that of Emil Czeczko. Facing criminal charges, this soldier deserted and fled to Belarus in late 2021. The Belarusian authorities paraded him as a 'proof' of the country's stringent observance of human rights, before the soldier's unexplained death in 2022.

Between 2020 and 2024, Szmydt lived in Grójec (near Warsaw) with a partner, who probably was a Russian businesswoman with a Ukrainian passport.

=== During PiS government ===
In 2018, Szmydt became a member of the Polish Minister of Justice's team for 'optimizing' the system of judicial disciplinary actions. In this capacity, as a member judge of the National Council of the Judiciary (KRS), Szmydt participated in the undermining the body's legal independence as part of the broader process of undermining the state of law in Poland during the Law and Justice party's rule (2015–2023). In 2019 the judge filed a baseless report to the Central Anticorruption Bureau (Centralne Biuro Antykorupcyjne, CBA) against journalist Eva Ivanova who had investigated the undermining of the rule of law in the judiciary system.

In 2019, it was revealed that Szmydt, together with his wife Emilia Szmydt, was a key person (see the diagram) in the WhatsApp private group Kasta (Polish for 'caste'), composed of pro-government judges and journalists. In conjunction with the then Polish Deputy Minister of Justice Piebiak, this group organized, carried out and oversaw the carrying out of social media and online actions of hate speech mobilization and discreditation (character assassination) against independent judges and those who opposed the Law and Justice (PiS) government's breaches of the Polish Constitution. The then ruling Law and Justice (PiS) party protected Szmydt and other Kasta members from prosecution. In this capacity Poland's de facto ruler (in 2015–2023) Jarosław Kaczyński corresponded with Szmydt's wife.

Now, the suspicion is that Russia's intelligence service controlled the Kasta, as part of a broader network of Russian (and Belarusian) secret agents in Poland and across Europe. Szmydt's superior Piebiak announced that the former was a Russian spy, and added that Russian spies had infiltrated the Polish judiciary. Polish intelligence specialists confirm this conclusion.
