= Latvijas Avīze =

Latvian newspaper

- Type: Daily newspaper
- Format: Compact
- Founded: 1988
- Political alignment: National conservative
- Language: Latvian
- Headquarters: Riga, Latvia
- Website: www.lasi.lv

Latvijas Avīze (Newspaper of Latvia) is a national conservative Latvian language national daily newspaper in Latvia, published in Riga.

The Latvian word avīze ('newspaper' or 'journal') is a loanword and cognate with the French word avis, meaning opinion, notice and advice.

== History ==
In January 1988, the newspaper Lauku Avīze ('Rural Newspaper') was first published in Soviet-occupied Latvia. After the restoration of Latvian independence in 1991 the AS Lauku Avīze (since 2017 - AS Latvijas Mediji) publishing house was established. In 2003, "Lauku Avīze" was renamed "Latvijas Avīze". In 2013, the publishing house worked with a profit of 23,140 euros and a turnover of 4,855,528 euros. In 2013, compared to 2012, the paper earned three times more, but the turnover decreased by 2%.

== About the newspaper ==
Latvijas Avīze reflects and analyzes social and political events and other developments in Latvia and the world every day. The newspaper won the Latvijas Pasts annual Press Subscription Award in the nomination "Most Delivered Publication in 2018".

== Online edition ==
The current online edition of the paper is integrated into the Lasi.lv news portal since 2023.

Latvijas Avīze was also the founder of Latvian news portal LA.LV - initially in line with the content of the newspaper, in October 2020 the chief editor of the site, Atis Sauka, announced that the portal will change its visual identity and switch to content different from the print edition. The site also hosts video content from the TV24 (formerly – Rīga TV24) TV channel under a cooperation agreement. Later LA.LV was taken under the umbrella of TV24 services.
