= Gobzems' List =

Latvian political party

Gobzems' List Gobzema saraksts
- Leader: TBA
- Founders: Aldis Gobzems; Jūlija Stepaņenko; Karina Sprūde; Ļubova Švecova
- Founded: 8 January 2021; 5 years ago
- Split from: For a Humane Latvia; Harmony
- Headquarters: Riga
- Membership (2026): 1252
- Ideology: Moderate nationalism; Historical: Right-wing populism
- Political position: Centre; Historical; Right-wing to far-right
- Colours: Green; Black
- Saeima: 0 / 100
- European Parliament: 0 / 9

Website
- gobzemasaraksts.lv

Gobzems' List (Latvian: Gobzema saraksts), previously known as Platform 21 (Latvian: Platforma 21, P21), For Each and Every One (Latvian: Katram un katrai, KuK) and Law and Order (Likums un kārtība, LuK), is a right-wing populist political party in Latvia. It is positioned on the right-wing on the political spectrum and it is staunchly socially conservative and Eurosceptic. It was founded in January 2021 with its first leader being Saeima deputy Aldis Gobzems.

After its leader and co-founder Aldis Gobzems left the party in October 2022 after party failed to pass the threshold in 2022 elections. The party gathered on its annual party congress in March 2023, where it was decided to change party's name to Platform 21, and elected Raimonds Lazdiņš as its new leader.

On 8 June 2026, following the fall of the Siliņa cabinet, and the subsequent announcement from Gobzems about his return to politics, it was revealed that Gobzems had joined his former party yet again, renaming it the Gobzems' List, and running in the 2026 Latvian parliamentary election. However, Gobzems said that he would not be the leader of it.

== Founding ==
Since being expelled from Who Owns the State? (KPV) in February 2019, Aldis Gobzems had hinted at starting a new party. A preliminary kick-off event for the party was held in Riga on 10 October 2020, with a promise to found the party by 22 November of the same year. Due to a national state of emergency caused by the COVID-19 pandemic and introduced on 9 November, that – among other things – put a temporary ban on gathering the 200 people needed to legally register a political party, the party founding and registration was postponed. In a 28 December 2020 interview with Latvijas Avīze, Gobzems said that he would found the party on 8 January 2021.

The party Law and Order was eventually founded via videolink on 8 January 2021. Among the over 500 co-founders attending the conference call were the four Saeima deputies Aldis Gobzems, Karina Sprūde, Ļubova Švecova, and Jūlija Stepaņenko. Gobzems and Sprūde were elected in the 2018 elections on the list of Who Owns the State?, while Švecova and Stepaņenko were elected on the Harmony list. (Note: Jūlija Stepaņenko was at the time a member of Honour to Serve Riga! (GKR), a municipal party in Riga, but ran and was elected on the Harmony electoral list at the 2018 elections. On the day of the first sitting of the 13th Saeima, Stepaņenko left the Harmony parliamentary faction.) Aldis Gobzems and Jūlija Stepaņenko were elected co-chairmen of the party.

On 29 January 2021, the Latvian Register of Enterprises postponed their decision on whether to legally register the party or not, due to issues with insufficient information in the application documents. The party was given exactly three months to fix the issues. On 26 February, the Register of Enterprises officially registered the party. Similarly to KPV, KuK was ideologically ambiguous while fielding relentless anti-elite rhetoric that tapped into the anti-vaccination and anti-lockdown movements that had spread across Latvia during the COVID-19 pandemic. In December 2021, Gobzems organized a "Rhododendron tour" of Latvia, culminating in an unlicensed, loosely organized evening demonstration outside Riga Castle, the residence of the President of Latvia.

Party co-chair Jūlija Stepaņenko and board member Ļubova Švecova, both members of parliament, left the party on 30 June 2021, citing Gobzems' style of communication. He had in weeks leading up to the breakaway been criticized for encouraging people not vaccinated against COVID-19 to wear a yellow star, as he claims the government's alleged discrimination against non-vaccinated people is comparable to that of the Jews in Nazi Germany.

On 16 March 2022, the party was renamed For Each and Every One. With only the pandemic and an anti-elite message to draw on, Gobzems left the country around spring and resettled with his family in Spain. Although he returned to campaign in the summer, his activity had diminished, and his party polled just 3.7% in the Saeima election. Almost immediately, Gobzems quit the party and permanently returned to Spain.

== Change to Platform 21 ==
At the party congress on 26 March 2023, the name of the party was changed to Platform 21. It was also decided that the party would become a centrist, modern national party. Raimonds Lazdiņš was elected as the chairman of the party. Party board member Karina Sprūde said that the change could be called "a restart" of the party. The number 21 in the name is said to symbolize the 21st century.

== Previous logos ==
2021–2022

2022–2023

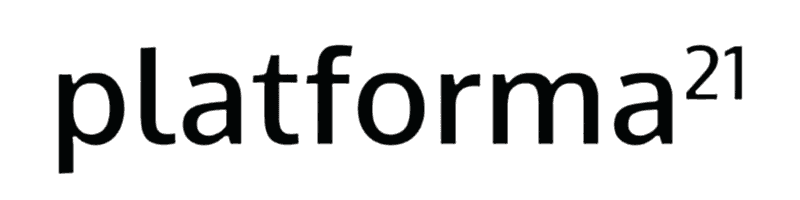
2023–2026

== Election results ==
=== Legislative elections ===
Election	Party leader	Performance					Rank	Government
Election	Party leader	Votes	%	± pp	Seats	+/–	Rank	Government
2022	Aldis Gobzems	33,578	3.72	New	0 / 100	New	10th	Extra-parliamentary
2026	Aldis Gobzems	7,900	1.00	▼2.72	0 / 100	0	▼12th	Extra-parliamentary
