= Central Election Commission (Latvia) =

Government agency of Latvia

- Latvian: Centrālā vēlēšanu komisija
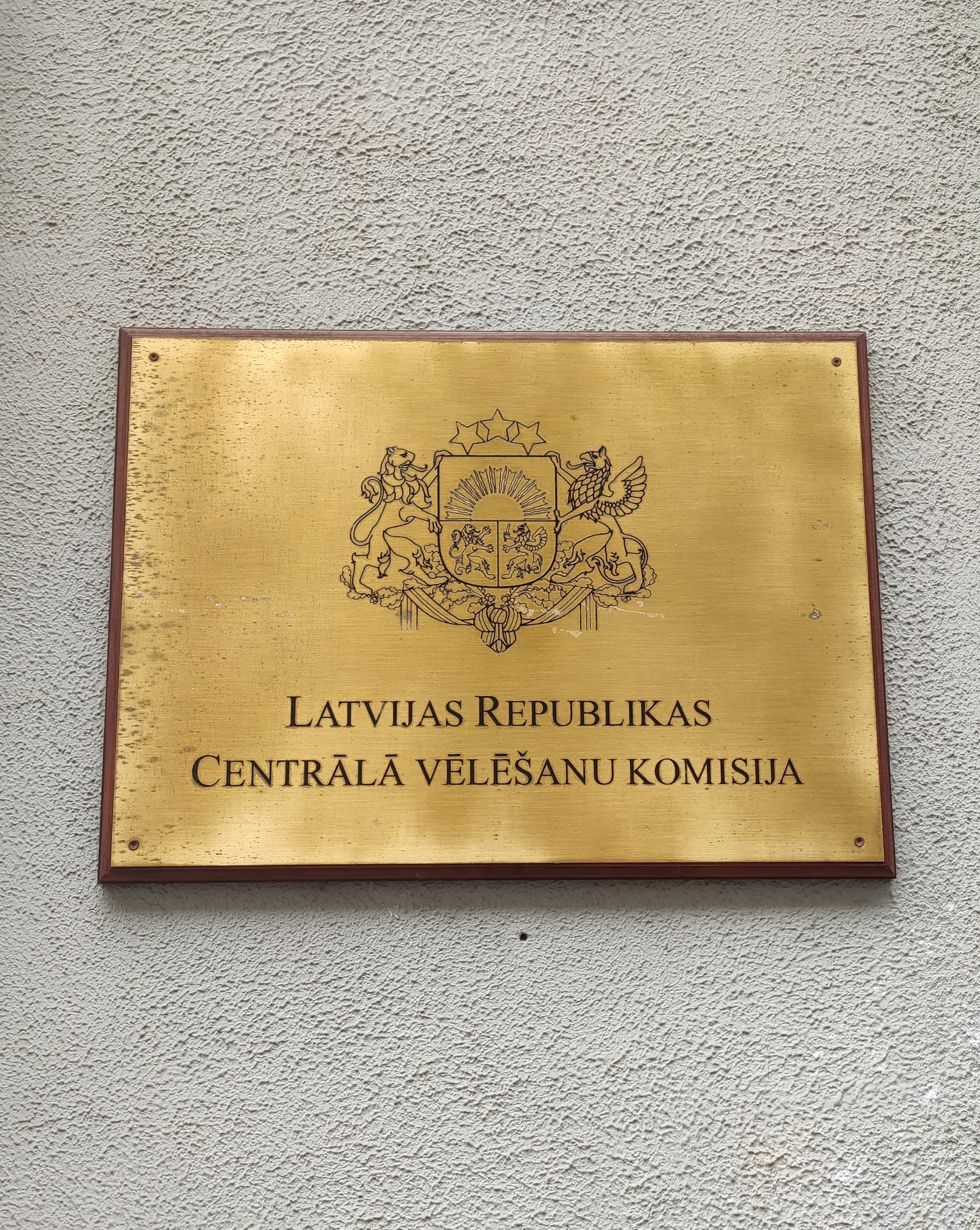
- Plaque by the CVK office in Riga

Agency overview
- Formed: 8 December 1992; 33 years ago (current form); 20 July 1922 (historically)
- Type: Central election commission
- Jurisdiction: Latvia
- Status: Active
- Headquarters: Smilšu iela 4, Riga, Latvia, LV-1050; 56.950320°N 24.105970°E
- Agency executive: Māris Zviedris, chairperson
- Website: cvk.lv

Central Election Commission (Latvian: Centrālā vēlēšanu komisija, abbreviated CVK) is the commission responsible for the organising and conducting of elections in the Republic of Latvia. It is regulated by Latvian national law. It organises elections to the Saeima, the European Parliament, local councils as well as referendums. The CVK is an independent state-owned institution and consists of nine members serving four year terms: the chairperson plus seven of the members are elected by the Saeima, while the ninth member is chosen among the judges of the Supreme Court of Latvia.

The commission was established in its current form after on 8 December 1992 after Latvian independence from the Soviet Union. It was, however, originally formed on 20 July 1922 for the first Saeima elections later same year. Since June 2025, Māris Zviedris has served as the commission's chairperson.

== Commission chairs ==
The commission has had five chairpersons:

Name	Period
Marģers Skujenieks	1922—1934
Ansis Buševics (Note: Appointed and operated under the Soviet occupation of Latvia, supervising the conduction of the undemocratic "People's Saeima" elections.)	1940
Atis Kramiņš	1993—1997
Arnis Cimdars	1997—2019
Kristīne Bērziņa	2019—2022
Kristīne Saulīte	2023—2025
Māris Zviedris	2025-present
