= Recognition of same-sex unions in Latvia =

Latvia has recognised same-sex civil unions since 1 July 2024. On 9 November 2023, the Saeima passed legislation establishing civil unions conferring similar rights and obligations as marriage with the exception of adoption and inheritance rights. The bill was signed into law by President Edgars Rinkēvičs in January 2024, and took effect on 1 July 2024. This followed a ruling from the Constitutional Court of Latvia on 12 November 2020 that the Latvian Constitution entitles same-sex couples to receive the same benefits and protections afforded by Latvian law to married opposite-sex couples.

Latvia does not recognise same-sex marriages, which have been prohibited by the Constitution since 2006.

== Civil unions ==
=== Background ===
On 23 September 1999, the National Human Rights Office (Valsts cilvēktiesību birojs) introduced a registered partnership bill to the Saeima. On 28 September, the proposal was sent to the Human Rights and Public Affairs Committee of the Saeima for discussion, but it was rejected by the commission on 30 November 1999. In January 2012, the Ombudsman's Office (Tiesībsarga birojs), the renamed National Human Rights Office since 2007, recommended that the Parliament reject registered partnership legislation. However, after Baltic Pride in June 2012, media revealed that the Ministry of Justice, led by Gaidis Bērziņš, was considering whether to recognise same-sex unions, either as unregistered cohabitation or as registered partnerships. Defence Minister Artis Pabriks expressed his support for registered partnerships. Mozaika, Latvia's largest LGBT rights organisation, estimated it would take approximately five years to obtain enough political support to pass the bill. In November 2014, while commenting on the coming out of the Minister for Foreign Affairs, Edgars Rinkēvičs, and on his call for the recognition of same-sex relationships in Latvia, Prime Minister Laimdota Straujuma reaffirmed her support for the constitutional prohibition on same-sex marriage. She also admitted that "Latvian law has not yet resolved the question of partner-relationships", explaining that the non-recognition of unmarried couples "affects many in Latvia" regardless of sexual orientation and that protection of such families "needs to be discussed by both the community and the Saeima". On 30 January 2015, Veiko Spolītis, an MP from the New Unity alliance, introduced a bill modifying the Civil Code to recognise same-sex partnerships. The proposed law would have allowed "any two persons" to register their partnership and enjoy almost all of the rights and obligations of marriage. The proposal was rejected by the Legal Affairs Committee of the Saeima on 24 February 2015.

On 23 March 2015, MP Juris Pūce from For Latvia's Development launched a signature collection campaign on ManaBalss.lv, calling for the passage of a cohabitation law in Latvia. The signatures were submitted to the Saeima in January 2018. In March 2018, the Mandate, Ethics and Submissions Committee recommended 5–4 that the initiative be rejected by the Saeima; 5 of the 9 committee members voted to recommend rejection, while the 4 others wanted further consideration. In October 2018, the ombudsman called on lawmakers to pass a partnership law for opposite-sex and same-sex couples, citing statistics showing that about half of Latvian children were born out of wedlock, and arguing that these families should enjoy legal protection. On 20 June 2019, MPs voted against sending the bill to further review in parliamentary committees; only 23 members voted for the bill, 60 voted against it and one member abstained. The Development/For! and New Unity alliances and some Social Democrats supported the bill, while the remaining Social Democrats, Who Owns the State?, the New Conservative Party, the National Alliance and the Union of Greens and Farmers as well as several independents were opposed. Supporters of the bill said they would "persevere" and persuade lawmakers to discuss it again in the future.

20 June 2019 vote in the Saeima
Political alliance	Voted for	Voted against	Abstained	Absent (Did not vote)
Social Democratic Party "Harmony"	6: Valērijs Agešins; Vjačeslavs Dombrovskis; Regīna Ločmele; Evija Papule; Igor Pimenov; Boris Tsilevitch	11: Jānis Ādamsons; Inga Goldberga; Andrejs Klementjevs; Ivans Klementjevs; Jānis Krišāns; Edgars Kucins; Vladimirs Nikonovs; Vitālijs Orlovs; Ivans Ribakovs; Artūrs Rubiks; Jānis Tutins	1: Nikolajs Kabanovs	4: Sergey Dolgopolov; Ļubova Švecova; Jānis Urbanovičs; Ivars Zariņš
New Conservative Party	–	15: Dagmāra Beitnere-Le Galla; Uldis Budriķis; Jānis Butāns; Jānis Cielēns; Gatis Eglītis; Krišjānis Feldmans; Andris Kazinovskis; Anita Muižniece; Linda Ozola; Juris Rancāns; Sandis Riekstiņš; Juta Strīķe; Evita Zālīte-Grosa; Reinis Znotiņš; Normunds Žunna	–	1: Juris Jurašs (Note: The MP did not have the right to vote at the time because they were being prosecuted.)
Development/For!	11: Dace Bluķe; Mārtiņš Bondars; Marija Golubeva; Daniels Pavļuts; Artūrs Toms Plešs; Dace Rukšāne-Ščipčinska; Andris Skride; Mārtiņš Staķis; Mārtiņš Šteins; Vita Anda Tērauda; Inese Voika	–	–	2: Ilmārs Dūrītis; Inese Ikstena
National Alliance	–	11: Jānis Dombrava; Raivis Dzintars; Jānis Iesalnieks; Ilze Indriksone; Ritvars Jansons; Rihards Kols; Janīna Kursīte-Pakule; Ināra Mūrniece; Romāns Naudiņš; Edvīns Šnore; Edmunds Teirumnieks	–	1: Aleksandrs Kiršteins
Who Owns the State?	–	10: Iveta Benhena-Bēkena; Aivars Geidāns; Kaspars Ģirģens; Artuss Kaimiņš; Ieva Krapāne; Janīna Kursīte; Ramona Petraviča; Ēriks Pucens; Ivars Puga; Jānis Vitenbergs	–	2: Aldis Blumbergs; Atis Zakatistovs
Union of Greens and Farmers	–	7: Uldis Augulis; Raimonds Bergmanis; Jānis Dūklavs; Janīna Jalinska; Armands Krauze; Māris Kučinskis; Viktors Valainis	–	4: Anda Čakša; Gundars Daudze; Dana Reizniece-Ozola; Jānis Vucāns
New Unity	6: Arvils Ašeradens; Andrejs Judins; Ojārs Ēriks Kalniņš; Rihards Kozlovskis; Atis Lejiņš; Inese Lībiņa-Egnere	–	–	2: Aldis Adamovičs; Ainars Latkovskis
Unaffiliated	–	6: Aldis Gobzems; Linda Liepiņa; Inguna Rībena; Karina Sprūde; Jūlija Stepaņenko; Didzis Šmits	–	–
Total	23	60	1	16
Total	23.0%	60.0%	1.0%	16.0%

On 29 October 2020, the Saeima voted 30–55 to reject a popular initiative entitled "Registration of same-sex partners" (Viendzimuma partneru reģistrēšana), signed by 10,392 citizens, calling for the passage of a civil union law. That same day, the authors of the initiative started a new petition, called "For Legal Protection of All Families" (Par Visu Ģimeņu Tiesisko Aizsardzību), which had been signed by 23,392 citizens by March 2022.

=== Constitutional Court ruling and failed attempts in 2020–2022 ===
On 12 November 2020, the Constitutional Court of Latvia ruled that the Labour Law (Latvian: Darba likums) violated Article 110 of the Constitution of Latvia, as it did not provide parental leave to the non-biological parent in a same-sex relationship. Although Article 110 has defined marriage as "a union between a man and a woman" since 2006, the term "family" is not explicitly defined. The court held that the family is not solely a union based on marriage, but a social institution formed by close personal ties based on understanding and respect. The court ruled that the Constitution requires the state to protect same-sex partners, and gave the Saeima until 1 June 2022 to amend the law and introduce a measure to legally protect same-sex couples. The Supreme Court ruled in December 2021 that should the government fail to provide a way for same-sex partners to register their relationships by the 1 June deadline, couples would be able to have their relationships individually recognized by the courts. On 2 February 2022, the Ministry of Justice, led by Dzintars Rasnačs, presented a civil union bill that would have provided same-sex couples with some of the rights and benefits of marriage. The second largest parliamentary group in the Saeima, the New Conservative Party, announced its support for the bill, despite the party having opposed all previous attempts to establish civil unions. Leader of the Social Democratic Party Jānis Urbanovičs also indicated that the bill might receive broader support from members of his parliamentary group. On 31 March 2022, the Saeima sent the civil union bill to the Legal Affairs Committee and approved it in first reading, with those opposed boycotting the vote in hopes that the Saeima would fail to meet the necessary quorum, but ultimately failing with exactly half of all MPs participating in the vote.

31 March 2022 vote in the Saeima
Political alliance	Voted for	Voted against	Abstained	Absent (Did not vote)
Social Democratic Party "Harmony"	4: Inga Goldberga; Regīna Ločmele; Igor Pimenov; Boris Tsilevitch	7: Andrejs Klementjevs; Jānis Krišāns; Edgars Kucins; Vladimirs Nikonovs; Vitālijs Orlovs; Ivans Ribakovs; Artūrs Rubiks	2: Sergey Dolgopolov; Nikolajs Kabanovs	5: Valērijs Agešins; Ivans Klementjevs; Jānis Tutins; Zenta Tretjaka; Jānis Urbanovičs
New Conservative Party	12: Ainars Baškis; Uldis Budriķis; Jānis Butāns; Jānis Cielēns; Krišjānis Feldmans; Līva Kreituse; Eva Mārtuža; Linda Medne; Juris Rancāns; Sandis Riekstiņš; Reinis Znotiņš; Normunds Žunna	–	–	4: Ieva Akuratere; Dagmāra Beitnere-Le Galla; Aivars Geidāns; Evita Zālīte-Grosa
Development/For!	11: Krista Baumane; Mārtiņš Bondars; Ilmārs Dūrītis; Viesturs Liepkalns; Juris Pūce; Dace Rukšāne-Ščipčinska; Andris Skride; Mārtiņš Šteins; Vita Anda Tērauda; Inese Voika; Gatis Zamurs	–	–	1: Aigars Bikše
National Alliance	–	–	–	12: Jānis Dombrava; Raivis Dzintars; Jānis Iesalnieks; Ilze Indriksone; Ritvars Jansons; Aleksandrs Kiršteins; Rihards Kols; Janīna Kursīte-Pakule; Ināra Mūrniece; Ivars Puga; Edvīns Šnore; Edmunds Teirumnieks
Union of Greens and Farmers	–	–	–	11: Uldis Augulis; Raimonds Bergmanis; Gundars Daudze; Jānis Dūklavs; Janīna Jalinska; Armands Krauze; Māris Kučinskis; Edgars Tavars; Didzis Šmits; Viktors Valainis; Jānis Vucāns
New Unity	9: Arvils Ašeradens; Iveta Benhena-Bēkena; Anda Čakša; Andrejs Judins; Rihards Kozlovskis; Ainars Latkovskis; Atis Lejiņš; Inese Lībiņa-Egnere; Kārlis Šadurskis	–	–	2: Aldis Adamovičs; Aldis Blumbergs
The Independents	–	–	–	6: Aldis Gobzems; Ieva Krapāne; Māris Možvillo; Ralfs Nemiro; Ramona Petraviča; Karina Sprūde
Unaffiliated	5: Vjačeslavs Dombrovskis; Artuss Kaimiņš; Evija Papule; Ilga Šuplinska; Atis Zakatistovs	–	–	9: Jānis Ādamsons; Kaspars Ģirģens; Janīna Kursīte; Māris Mičerevskis; Romāns Naudiņš; Ēriks Pucens; Inguna Rībena; Julija Stepanenko; Ļubova Švecova
Total	41	7	2	50
Total	41.0%	7.0%	2.0%	50.0%

The bill's final reading was blocked on 2 June due to a lack of quorum, as only 40 MPs participated in the vote, and Speaker Ināra Mūrniece ended the parliamentary session without the bill being passed. The legislation was placed on the agenda for a future sitting of Parliament, and needed to pass before the parliamentary election held on 1 October 2022. As a result, the 1 June deadline by the Constitutional Court expired, meaning that same-sex couples could now individually ask courts to recognise their relationships and enjoy some of the benefits and obligations offered by marriage. The Vice-President of the Constitutional Court, Irēna Kucina, said that "institutions and administrative courts [would] apply the Constitution directly". On 30 May, the Administrative District Court in Riga granted the first application from a same-sex couple and recognised the "public legal existence" of their relationship, concluding that the couple had a "relationship that fits the definition outlined in Article 110 of the Constitution". The court lamented that the Saeima had not "fulfilled its duty". The Administrative District Court had recognized four same-sex couples by 8 July 2022, and 16 couples by 28 October 2022.

The proposed legislation in the Saeima would have established civil unions providing some of the rights, obligations and benefits of marriage, including in the areas of inheritance and tax. The bill would have also allowed same-sex partners to obtain information on the health of a hospitalised partner and make emergency health decisions, receive benefits in the event their partner dies, and claim care for their partner in the event that they have a disability. Civil unions would have been open to all adult citizens and non-residents of Latvia, including refugees and stateless people, but would not have been allowed to persons who are already married, in another civil union or who are blood relatives or related by adoption. They would have been registered and dissolved using a procedure similar to that for civil marriage. However, the bill would have not allowed same-sex couples to share a common surname or to adopt. In addition, civil partners would not have automatically become heirs to the common property, but they would have been able to draw up a will or a contract of inheritance to legally contract for how their protected common property would have been divided before any eventual separation. On 6 December 2022, following the October elections and the formation of a new government, the Legal Affairs Committee rejected the proposed civil union bill. However, registering a relationship with the courts was still possible. In January 2023, the Grand Chamber of the European Court of Human Rights ruled in Fedotova and Others v. Russia that Article 8 of the European Convention on Human Rights, which guarantees a right to private and family life, imposes a positive obligation on all member states of the Council of Europe to recognize same-sex partnerships.

=== Passage of legislation in 2023 ===
Following Krišjānis Kariņš' resignation as prime minister in August 2023, a new government, led by Prime Minister Evika Siliņa and consisting of the New Unity, the Union of Greens and Farmers and The Progressives, was sworn in on 15 September 2023. A political analyst said, "The most significant policy shift could be the new government’s intention to legislate on human rights, such as to try to allow marriages for same-sex couples [sic]." Leader of The Progressives Kaspars Briškens said there was "a willingness [in the government] to work on a new Law on Cohabitation for same-sex persons". On 26 October 2023, the New Unity alliance proposed a newly-drafted legislative package recognising same-sex unions. The legislation would establish civil partnerships (Latvian: civilā partnerība, pronounced [ˈtsivilaː ˈpartneriːba]) (Note: Russian: гражданское партнёрство, graždánskoje partnjórstvo, pronounced [ɡrɐʐˈdanskə.jə pɐrtˈnʲɵrstvə]; Latgalian: civilā savīneiba; Livonian: kubsjelāmilieppimi) providing the same rights and benefits as marriage with the exception of adoption and inheritance rights. On 30 October, Prime Minister Siliņa announced that the coalition government had decided to support the bill. She added that there was unanimous backing from The Progressives and the Union of Greens and Farmers, as well as Independent MP Oļegs Burovs, who had previously opposed same-sex unions. On 2 November, the legislation passed its first reading in the Saeima by a 53–40 vote, with all 52 coalition MPs and Burovs voting in favour. On 9 November, the legislation passed its second and final reading in the Saeima by a 53–43 vote.

9 November 2023 vote in the Saeima
Political alliance	Voted for	Voted against	Abstained	Absent (Did not vote)
New Unity	26: Viktorija Baire; Andrejs Ceļapīters; Ingrīda Circene; Raimonds Čudars; Mārtiņš Daģis; Dāvis Mārtiņš Daugavietis; Mārtiņš Felss; Alīna Gendele; Andrejs Judins; Edmunds Jurēvics; Zanda Kalniņa-Lukaševica; Inese Kalniņa; Irma Kalniņa; Agnese Krasta; Ģirts Valdis Kristovskis; Atis Labucis; Ainars Latkovskis; Gatis Liepiņš; Jānis Patmalnieks; Anna Rancāne; Jānis Reirs; Uģis Rotbergs; Zane Skujiņa-Rubene; Jānis Skrastiņš; Ilze Vergina; Agita Zariņa-Stūre	–	–	–
Union of Greens and Farmers	16: Andris Bērziņš; Anita Brakovska; Augusts Brigmanis; Gundars Daudze; Ligita Gintere; Juris Jakovins; Līga Kļaviņa; Līga Kozlovska; Gunārs Kūtris; Valdis Maslovskis; Daiga Mieriņa; Harijs Rokpelnis; Ģirts Štekerhofs; Andrejs Vilks; Jānis Vucāns; Didzis Zemmers	–	–	–
United List	1: Česlavs Batņa	12: Raimonds Bergmanis; Māris Kučinskis; Ingmārs Līdaka; Lauris Lizbovskis; Linda Matisone; Edvards Smiltēns; Māris Sprindžuks; Juris Viļums; Edgars Putra; Didzis Šmits; Edgars Tavars; Aiva Vīksna	–	1: Andris Kulbergs
National Alliance	–	12: Artūrs Butāns; Jānis Dombrava; Jānis Grasbergs; Ilze Indriksone; Aleksandrs Kiršteins; Rihards Kols; Uģis Mitrevics; Ināra Mūrniece; Nauris Puntulis; Edvīns Šnore; Edmunds Teirumnieks; Jānis Vitenbergs	–	1: Raivis Dzintars
For Stability!	–	9: Svetlana Čulkova; Jekaterina Drelinga; Iļja Ivanovs; Igors Judins; Jefimijs Klementjevs; Dmitrijs Kovaļenko; Viktorija Pleškāne; Viktors Pučka; Aleksejs Rosļikovs	–	1: Nataļja Marčenko-Jodko
The Progressives	10: Skaidrīte Ābrama; Edmunds Cepurītis; Ervins Labanovskis; Mairita Lūse; Antoņina Ņenaševa; Leila Rasima; Jana Simanovska; Andris Šuvajevs; Atis Švinka; Edgars Zelderis	–	–	–
Latvia First	–	8: Mārcis Jencītis; Kristaps Krištopans; Vilis Krištopans; Linda Liepiņa; Ramona Petraviča; Ainārs Šlesers; Ričards Šlesers; Edmunds Zivtiņš	–	–
Unaffiliated	–	2: Glorija Grevcova; Igors Rajevs	1: Oļegs Burovs	–
Total	53	43	1	3
Total	53.0%	43.0%	1.0%	3.0%

However, 34 opposition MPs tabled a motion asking President Edgars Rinkēvičs to delay promulgating the bill until January 2024. Opponents were seeking to collect 154,241 signatures (10% of voters) in order to proceed with a referendum on the civil union law. Rinkēvičs reacted, "This [suspension of publication of the law] will be done in accordance with the Constitution. Saeima deputies have the right to exercise their constitutional rights, and now, the society, citizens of Latvia, have two months to support this idea or not." Prime Minister Siliņa welcomed the law's passage, tweeting, "This is a good day. Society has taken an important step in creating a modern and humane Latvia." The Central Election Commission reported on 26 December that 16,170 signatures had been collected by then. Only 35,191 signatures had been collected by the deadline on 5 January 2024, meaning that the referendum initiative had failed. The bill was subsequently signed into law by Rinkēvičs and took effect on 1 July 2024. The first civil partnership was performed in Riga on 1 July between Maksims Ringo and Jānis Locs.

=== Statistics ===
613 partnerships had been registered by July 2025, of which 235 were between same-sex couples.

== Same-sex marriage ==
Laws regarding same-sex partnerships in Europe¹ Marriage Civil union Limited domestic recognition (cohabitation) Unrecognized Constitution limits marriage to opposite-sex couples ¹ May include recent laws or court decisions that have not yet entered into effect.

=== Constitutional ban ===
In December 2005, the Saeima voted 65–5 to approve an amendment to the Constitution of Latvia banning same-sex marriage. The amendment took effect on 17 January 2006. Article 110 reads: "The State shall protect and support marriage — a union between a man and a woman, the family, the rights of parents and rights of the child". (Note: In some languages of Latvia: Latvian: Valsts aizsargā un atbalsta laulību — savienību starp vīrieti un sievieti, ģimeni, vecāku un bērna tiesības.; Russian: Государство защищает и поддерживает брак – союз между мужчиной и женщиной, семью, права родителей и детей.; Livonian: Vald kāitsõb ja tigūb abjelāmiz — īt mīe ja naiz vailõ, aimõ, vaņīmiz ja laps õigiži.)

=== Recognition of marriages performed abroad ===
On 5 June 2018, the European Court of Justice ruled in favour of a Romanian-American same-sex couple seeking recognition of their marriage in Romania, so that the American partner could reside in the country. The court held in Coman and Others v General Inspectorate for Immigration and Ministry of the Interior that European Union (EU) member states must uphold the freedom of movement and residency rights of same-sex spouses, provided that one partner is an EU citizen. While EU member states may choose whether to legalise same-sex marriage, they cannot restrict the right of residence for EU citizens and their spouses. The ECJ also clarified that the term "spouse" is gender-neutral and does not necessarily refer to someone of the opposite sex. The Latvian Government and the Office of Citizenship and Migration Affairs announced their intention to abide by the ruling. Later that month, a Russian national, who had married her Latvian same-sex partner in Portugal, received a residence permit, allowing her to reside in Latvia with her spouse.

On 22 November 2025, the European Court of Justice expanded on its Conan and Others ruling, holding in Jakub Cupriak-Trojan and Mateusz Trojan v Wojewoda Mazowiecki, a Polish case, that all member states of the European Union must recognise same-sex marriages validly performed within the European Union. The case involved a dual Polish-German couple who had married in Germany but sought recognition of their marriage in Poland. The ruling had an immediate legal effect in Latvia as well, with media outlets reporting that "authorities must recognize same-sex marriages performed abroad as full marriages, rather than just granting them the limited rights of a registered partnership". Cupriak-Trojan and Trojan does not compel Latvia to change its domestic laws to legalise same-sex marriage, but it does require that the country accept the legal status of couples married elsewhere in the European Union. In March 2026, in a local case regarding the recognition of a Swedish marriage, the Latvian Supreme Court referred a question to the ECJ on whether the recognition of foreign same-sex unions as civil partnerships is sufficient to comply with the Cupriak-Trojan and Trojan ruling.

=== Court cases ===
In 2015, two same-sex couples attempted to register their marriages at the Registry Office in Riga, which refused citing Latvia's constitutional ban on same-sex marriage. The Administrative District Court, and later the Administrative Regional Court, ruled against the couples, holding that the recognition of same-sex marriage was not possible in Latvia and that this was a matter for the Parliament to address. In May 2016, the Supreme Court of Latvia overturned the Administrative Regional Court's decision. A court press spokeswoman said that the Supreme Court agreed with the administrative courts that Latvian law did not allow for same-sex marriages to be legally recognized; however, the matter "should have been considered in a context not of marriage, but of registering familial partnership". Additionally, it "would have been impossible to conclude whether the applicants' rights had been violated unless their claim was accepted and reviewed in a proper manner." In June 2021, the Supreme Court submitted a petition to the Constitutional Court of Latvia and stayed proceedings in the case. However, the Constitutional Court had already ruled in November 2020 that the Constitution imposes an obligation on the Parliament to establish a legal framework for same-sex unions. In July 2021, the Constitutional Court rejected the Supreme Court's petition, stating that it had failed to adequately explain why the November 2020 ruling was not applicable in this case. Subsequently, in December 2021, the Supreme Court ruled that couples could register civil partnerships with the courts, even in the absence of specific legislation. It ruled that same-sex couples could ask regional courts to recognize their relationships in line with the Law on Registration of Civil Status Acts (Latvian: Civilstāvokļa aktu reģistrācijas likums) if the Saeima failed to pass legislation protecting same-sex couples. The court held that, "The obligation to ensure the legal protection of same-sex couples also follows from the principle of human dignity, which requires recognizing the inherent dignity and equal value of each human being." The ruling states:

Until Parliament has created an appropriate legal framework, a judgment establishing that the relationships of certain persons are to be recognized as family relationships within the meaning of Article 110 of the Constitution will replace the registration of these relationships by the State. […] Summarizing the above, it can be concluded that the first sentence of Article 110 of the Constitution, in conjunction with the principle of human dignity, establishes a legal obligation on the State to ensure legal recognition of the family relations of same-sex couples. In the absence of a specific legal framework, the law enforcer, including the court, is obliged to ensure the effective implementation of the Constitution and human rights. […] Therefore, the judgment of the regional court is annulled.

=== Religious performance ===
The largest religious denominations in Latvia are the Evangelical Lutheran Church and the Catholic Church. As of 2023, only around 13% of couples in Latvia were married in church. The Evangelical Lutheran Church strongly opposes same-sex unions. In June 2025, the Archbishop of Riga, Rinalds Grants, reiterated the Church's opposition to the ordination of women and same-sex marriage, calling the blessing of same-sex unions "unbiblical". The Catholic Church likewise opposes same-sex marriage and does not allow its priests to officiate at such marriages. In 2022, the Archbishop of Riga, Zbigņevs Stankevičs, expressed his support for "binding contracts" to protect same-sex couples living in a common household, but reiterated the Church's opposition to same-sex marriage. Stankevičs further incorrectly argued that the Istanbul Convention, a human rights treaty opposing violence against women and domestic violence, would eventually legalize same-sex marriage, and called on the government to ignore the Constitutional Court ruling requiring the passage of a civil union law. In December 2023, the Holy See published Fiducia supplicans, a declaration allowing Catholic priests to bless couples who are not considered to be married according to church teaching, including the blessing of same-sex couples.

== Public opinion ==
The 2015 Eurobarometer found that 19% of Latvians supported same-sex marriage. In 2019, the Eurobarometer showed that support had increased to 24%, while 70% were opposed.

A GLOBSEC survey conducted in March 2023 showed that 40% of Latvians supported same-sex marriage, while 46% were opposed and 14% were undecided. The 2023 Eurobarometer found that 36% of Latvians thought same-sex marriage should be allowed throughout Europe, while 59% were opposed. The survey also found that 35% of Latvians thought that "there is nothing wrong in a sexual relationship between two persons of the same sex", while 59% disagreed.

== See also ==
- LGBT rights in Latvia
- Recognition of same-sex unions in Lithuania
- Recognition of same-sex unions in Europe
- Same-sex marriage in Estonia
- Same-sex union court cases
