= Thirteenth Saeima of Latvia =

Parliament of Latvia 2018–2022

←	Twelfth Saeima of Latvia	Fourteenth Saeima of Latvia	→
- Parliamentary groups of the 13th Saeima as of June 2021

Overview
- Legislative body: Saeima
- Jurisdiction: Latvia
- Term: 6 November 2018— 1 November 2022
- Website: www.saeima.lv
- Members: 100
- Speaker: Ināra Mūrniece (NA)
- Vice-Speakers: Dagmāra Beitnere-Le Galla (JKP); Inese Lībiņa-Egnere (JV)

The Thirteenth Saeima of Latvia was elected in the 2018 Latvian parliamentary election held on 6 October 2018. The Saeima's term commenced on 6 November 2018 and ended on 1 November 2022.

== Elections ==
The 100 members of the Saeima are elected by open list proportional representation from five multi-member constituencies (Kurzeme, Latgale, Riga (in which overseas votes are counted), Vidzeme and Zemgale) between 12 and 35 seats in size. Seats are allocated using the Sainte-Laguë method with a national electoral threshold of 5%.

Party	Votes	%	Seats	+/–
Harmony	167,117	19.80	23	–1
Who Owns the State?	120,264	14.25	16	New
New Conservative Party	114,694	13.59	16	+16
Development/For!	101,685	12.04	13	+13
National Alliance	92,963	11.01	13	–4
Union of Greens and Farmers	83,675	9.91	11	–10
New Unity	56,542	6.69	8	–15
Latvian Association of Regions	35,018	4.14	0	–8
Latvian Russian Union	27,014	3.20	0	0
The Progressives	22,078	2.61	0	New
For Latvia from the Heart	7,114	0.84	0	–7
Latvian Nationalists	4,245	0.50	0	New
For an Alternative	2,900	0.34	0	New
SKG Union (LSDSP–KDS–GKL)	1,735	0.20	0	New
Eurosceptic Action Party	1,059	0.12	0	New
Latvian Centrist Party	897	0.10	0	New
Invalid/blank votes	5,925	–	–	–
Total	844,925	100	100	0
Registered voters/turnout	1,548,100	54.58	–	–
Source: CVK

== Composition ==
=== Parliamentary groups ===
After the elections, the parliamentary groups were formed in the Saeima on the party lines, with the exception of MP Julija Stepanenko, who was elected from the Harmony list but didn't join the party's parliamentary group.

Parliamentary groups
Party	Party leader	Group leader	Elected seats	Current seats	Change
Social Democratic Party "Harmony" Group	Jānis Urbanovičs		22	18	▼4
New Conservatives' Group	Jānis Bordāns	Juris Jurašs	16	15	▼1
The Independent Group	Jurģis Miezainis Aldis Gobzems	Aldis Gobzems	16	6	▼10
"Development/For!" Group	Daniels Pavļuts; Artūrs Toms Plešs	Jūris Pūce	13	13	Steady
National Alliance Group	Raivis Dzintars		13	11	▼2
Union of Greens and Farmers Group	Edgars Tavars; Armands Krauze	Uldis Augulis	11	7	▼4
New Unity Group	Krišjānis Kariņš	Ainars Latkovskis	8	8	Steady
Unaffiliated Members' Group			1	23	▲22

== List of members ==
123 members have served in the Thirteenth Saeima.

Name, Surname	Constituency	Party		Parliamentary Group	Notes
Aldis Adamovičs	Latgale		Latgale Party	New Unity Group	
Jānis Ādamsons	Vidzeme		Independent	Unaffiliated Members' Group	Left Harmony on 31 August 2021
Valērijs Agešins	Kurzeme		Harmony	Harmony Group	
Arvils Ašeradens	Kurzeme		Unity	New Unity Group	
Uldis Augulis	Zemgale		Latvian Farmers' Union	Union of Greens and Farmers Group	
Ainars Bašķis	Vidzeme		New Conservative Party	New Conservatives' Group	MP since 6 July 2021, replaced Anita Muižniece
Krista Baumane	Riga		Movement "For!"	"Development/For!" Group	MP since 11 June 2020, replaced Mārtiņš Staķis
Dagmāra Beitnere-Le Galla	Vidzeme		New Conservative Party	New Conservatives' Group	Vice Speaker of the Saeima
Māris Beļaunieks	Vidzeme		New Conservative Party	New Conservatives' Group	MP from 8 June until 6 July 2021, replaced Anita Muižniece
Iveta Benhena-Bēkena	Riga		Unity	Unaffiliated Members' Group	Elected from the KPV LV list, joined Unity on 26 April 2021
Raimonds Bergmanis	Vidzeme		Latvian Green Party	Union of Greens and Farmers Group	
Aigars Bikše	Zemgale		For Latvia's Development	"Development/For!" Group	MP since 18 December 2020, replaced Artūrs Toms Plešs
Dace Bluķe	Kurzeme		Movement "For!"	"Development/For!" Group	MP from 31 January 2019 until 19 November 2020, replaced Jūris Pūce
Aldis Blumbergs	Vidzeme		Unity	Unaffiliated Members' Group	Elected from the KPV LV list, joined Unity on 21 September 2020
Mārtiņš Bondars	Latgale		For Latvia's Development	"Development/For!" Group	
Jānis Bordāns	Vidzeme		New Conservative Party	New Conservatives' Group	MP until 31 January 2019
Uldis Budriķis	Kurzeme		New Conservative Party	New Conservatives' Group	
Jānis Butāns	Riga		New Conservative Party	New Conservatives' Group	MP since 31 January 2019, replaced Juta Strīķe
Jānis Cielēns	Vidzeme		New Conservative Party	New Conservatives' Group	MP since 31 January 2019, replaced Jānis Bordāns
Boriss Cilevičs	Riga		Harmony	Harmony Group	
Anda Čakša	Riga		Unity	Unaffiliated Members' Group	Elected from the ZZS list, joined Unity on 26 December 2019
Gundars Daudze	Kurzeme		For Latvia and Ventspils	Union of Greens and Farmers Group	
Sergejs Dolgopolovs	Vidzeme		Harmony	Harmony Group	
Jānis Dombrava	Vidzeme		National Alliance	National Alliance Group	
Vjačeslavs Dombrovskis	Riga		Republic	Unaffiliated Members' Group	Expelled from Harmony on 15 September 2020
Jānis Dūklavs	Latgale		Independent	Union of Greens and Farmers Group	
Ilmārs Dūrītis	Zemgale		Movement "For!"	"Development/For!" Group	
Raivis Dzintars	Vidzeme		National Alliance	National Alliance Group	
Gatis Eglītis	Riga		New Conservative Party	New Conservatives' Group	MP until 8 June 2021
Krišjānis Feldmans	Zemgale		New Conservative Party	New Conservatives' Group	
Aivars Geidāns	Zemgale		New Conservative Party	Unaffiliated Members' Group	MP since 16 June 2021, replaced Jānis Vitenbergs, joined JKP in 2021
Aldis Gobzems	Riga		Law and Order	The Independent Group	Expelled from KPV LV on 4 February 2019, rejoined the group on 8 September 2021
Inga Goldberga	Latgale		Harmony	Harmony Group	
Marija Golubeva	Riga		Movement "For!"	"Development/For!" Group	MP until 8 June 2021
Kaspars Ģirģens	Zemgale		Republic	Unaffiliated Members' Group	Left KPV LV Group on 12 August 2021
Jānis Iesalnieks	Riga		National Alliance	National Alliance Group	MP since 31 January 2019, replaced Dace Melbārde
Inese Ikstena	Vidzeme		For Latvia's Development	"Development/For!" Group	MP until her death on 5 June 2021
Ilze Indriksone	Latgale		National Alliance	National Alliance Group	
Janīna Jalinska	Latgale		Independent	Union of Greens and Farmers Group	
Ritvars Jansons	Riga		National Alliance	National Alliance Group	
Andrejs Judins	Riga		Unity	New Unity Group	
Juris Jurašs	Kurzeme		New Conservative Party	New Conservatives' Group	
Nikolajs Kabanovs	Riga		Harmony	Harmony Group	
Artuss Kaimiņš	Riga		Independent	Unaffiliated Members' Group	Expelled from KPV LV on 8 January 2020
Ojārs Ēriks Kalniņš	Riga		Unity	New Unity Group	MP until his death on 14 October 2021
Andris Kazinovskis	Latgale		Independent	Unaffiliated Members' Group	Left JKP on 26 May 2020, MP from 31 January 2019 until 8 June 2021
Aleksandrs Kiršteins	Riga		National Alliance	National Alliance Group	
Andrejs Klementjevs	Riga		Harmony	Harmony Group	Secretary of the Saeima
Ivans Klementjevs	Riga		Harmony	Harmony Group	
Rihards Kols	Riga		National Alliance	National Alliance Group	
Rihards Kozlovskis	Riga		Unity	New Unity Group	MP since 7 February 2019, replaced Edgars Rinkēvičs
Ieva Krapāne	Vidzeme		Independent	The Independent Group	
Armands Krauze	Vidzeme		Latvian Farmers' Union	Union of Greens and Farmers Group	
Līva Kreituse	Riga		New Conservative Party	New Conservatives' Group	MP since 8 June 2021, replaced Gatis Eglītis
Jānis Krišāns	Latgale		Harmony	Harmony Group	
Edgars Kronbergs	Kurzeme		Independent	Unaffiliated Members' Group	MP from 4 February 2021 until 8 June 2021, replaced Ramona Petrāviča
Edgars Kucins	Latgale		Harmony	Harmony Group	
Māris Kučinskis	Vidzeme		Liepāja Party	Union of Greens and Farmers Group	
Janīna Kursīte	Latgale		Independent	Unaffiliated Members' Group	Left the KPV LV Group on 12 May 2021
Janīna Kursīte-Pakule	Kurzeme		National Alliance	National Alliance Group	
Ainars Latkovskis	Vidzeme		Unity	New Unity Group	
Atis Lejiņš	Zemgale		Unity	New Unity Group	MP since 31 January 2019, replaced Jānis Reirs
Inese Lībiņa-Egnere	Vidzeme		Unity	New Unity Group	Vice Speaker of the Saeima
Linda Liepiņa	Vidzeme		Independent	Unaffiliated Members' Group	Left KPV LV on 30 May 2019, MP until 22 October 2020
Viesturs Liepkalns	Vidzeme		For Latvia's Development	"Development/For!" Group	MP from 8 June 2021, replaced Artis Pabriks
Tālis Linkaits	Riga		New Conservative Party	New Conservatives' Group	MP until 31 January 2019
Regīna Ločmele	Riga		Harmony	Harmony Group	
Eva Mārtuža	Riga		New Conservative Party	New Conservatives' Group	MP since 2 April 2020, replaced Linda Ozola
Linda Medne	Riga		New Conservative Party	New Conservatives' Group	MP since 8 October 2020, replaced Tālis Linkaits
Dace Melbārde	Riga		National Alliance	National Alliance Group	MP until 31 January 2019
Māris Mičerevskis	Riga		Independent	Unaffiliated Members' Group	MP since 8 June 2021, replaced Marija Golubeva
Māris Možvillo	Vidzeme		For a Humane Latvia	The Independent Group	MP since 22 October 2020, replaced Linda Liepiņa
Anita Muižniece	Vidzeme		New Conservative Party	New Conservatives' Group	MP until 8 June 2021
Ināra Mūrniece	Vidzeme		National Alliance	National Alliance Group	Speaker of the Saeima
Romāns Naudiņš	Vidzeme		Independent	Unaffiliated Members' Group	Left NA on 24 January 2022
Ralfs Nemiro	Zemgale		Independent	The Independent Group	MP until 31 January 2019 and from 20 March 2020
Vladimirs Nikonovs	Latgale		Harmony	Harmony Group	
Vitālijs Orlovs	Zemgale		Harmony	Harmony Group	
Linda Ozola	Riga		New Conservative Party	New Conservatives' Group	MP until 2 October 2020
Artis Pabriks	Vidzeme		For Latvia's Development	"Development/For!" Group	MP until 31 January 2019
Evija Papule	Vidzeme		Republic	Unaffiliated Members' Group	Left Harmony on 15 September 2020
Daniels Pavļuts	Riga		Movement "For!"	"Development/For!" Group	MP until 14 January 2021
Ramona Petraviča	Kurzeme		Independent	The Independent Group	MP until 4 February 2021 and from 8 June 2021, left PCL in 2021
Igors Pimenovs	Riga		Harmony	Harmony Group	
Artūrs Toms Plešs	Zemgale		For Latvia's Development	"Development/For!" Group	MP until 18 December 2020
Juris Pūce	Kurzeme		For Latvia's Development	"Development/For!" Group	MP until 31 January 2019 and from 11 November 2020
Ēriks Pucens	Kurzeme		Republic	Unaffiliated Members' Group	Left KPV LV Group on 14 September 2021
Ivars Puga	Riga		National Alliance	Unaffiliated Members' Group	Left KPV LV on 12 May 2021, joined NA in 2021
Juris Rancāns	Latgale		New Conservative Party	New Conservatives' Group	
Jānis Reirs	Zemgale		Unity	New Unity Group	MP until 31 January 2019
Dana Reizniece-Ozola	Riga		Latvian Farmers' Union	Union of Greens and Farmers Group	MP until 7 January 2021
Ivans Ribakovs	Latgale		Harmony	Harmony Group	
Inguna Rībena	Zemgale		Independent	Unaffiliated Members' Group	Left National Alliance on 5 June 2019
Sandis Riekstiņš	Zemgale		New Conservative Party	New Conservatives' Group	
Edgars Rinkēvičs	Riga		Unity	New Unity Group	MP until 7 February 2019
Artūrs Rubiks	Riga		Socialist Party	Harmony Group	
Dace Rukšāne-Ščipčinska	Vidzeme		For Latvia's Development	"Development/For!" Group	
Andris Skride	Vidzeme		Growth	"Development/For!" Group	
Karina Sprūde	Vidzeme		Law and Order	The Independent Group	Left KPV LV on 3 June 2019, rejoined the group on 8 September 2021
Mārtiņš Staķis	Riga		Movement "For!"	"Development/For!" Group	MP until 11 June 2020
Jūlija Stepaņenko	Riga		Latvia First	Unaffiliated Members' Group	Elected from the Harmony list
Juta Strīķe	Riga		New Conservative Party	New Conservatives' Group	MP until her death on 18 March 2020
Kārlis Šadurskis	Riga		Unity	New Unity Group	MP since 25 October 2021, replaced Ojārs Ēriks Kalniņš
Didzis Šmits	Riga		Independent	Unaffiliated Members' Group	Left KPV LV on 13 June 2019
Edvīns Šnore	Zemgale		National Alliance	National Alliance Group	
Mārtiņš Šteins	Vidzeme		Movement "For!"	"Development/For!" Group	MP since 31 January 2019, replaced Inese Ikstena
Ilga Šuplinska	Latgale		Independent	Unaffiliated Members' Group	MP until 31 January 2019 and since 8 June 2021
Ļubova Švecova	Riga		Latvia First	Unaffiliated Members' Group	Expelled from Harmony on 15 September 2020
Edgars Tavars	Riga		Latvian Green Party	Union of Greens and Farmers Group	MP since 7 January 2021, replaced Dana Reizniece-Ozola
Edmunds Teirumnieks	Latgale		National Alliance	National Alliance Group	
Vita Anda Tērauda	Riga		Movement "For!"	"Development/For!" Group	
Jānis Tutins	Latgale		Harmony	Harmony Group	
Jānis Urbanovičs	Riga		Harmony	Harmony Group	
Viktors Valainis	Zemgale		Latvian Farmers' Union	Union of Greens and Farmers Group	
Jānis Vitenbergs	Zemgale		National Alliance	Unaffiliated Members' Group	MP until 2 April 2020 and from 20 May until 8 June 2021, elected from the KPV LV list
Inese Voika	Riga		Movement "For!"	"Development/For!" Group	Deputy Secretary of the Saeima
Jānis Vucāns	Kurzeme		For Latvia and Ventspils	Union of Greens and Farmers Group	
Atis Zakatistovs	Kurzeme		Independent	Unaffiliated Members' Group	Expelled from KPV LV on 12 December 2020
Evita Zālīte-Grosa	Vidzeme		New Conservative Party	New Conservatives' Group	
Gatis Zamurs	Riga		For Latvia's Development	"Development/For!" Group	MP since 14 January, replaced Daniels Pavļuts
Ivars Zariņš	Zemgale		Harmony	Harmony Group	
Reinis Znotiņš	Riga		New Conservative Party	New Conservatives' Group	
Normunds Žunna	Vidzeme		New Conservative Party	New Conservatives' Group	
