= Kariņš cabinet =

Two governments in Latvia were led by Krišjānis Kariņš during his premiership between 2019 and 2023:

- First Kariņš cabinet (2019–2022)
- Second Kariņš cabinet (2022–2023)
