= First Kariņš cabinet =

Government of Latvia, 2019–2022

- 40th Cabinet of Republic of Latvia
- 2019–2022
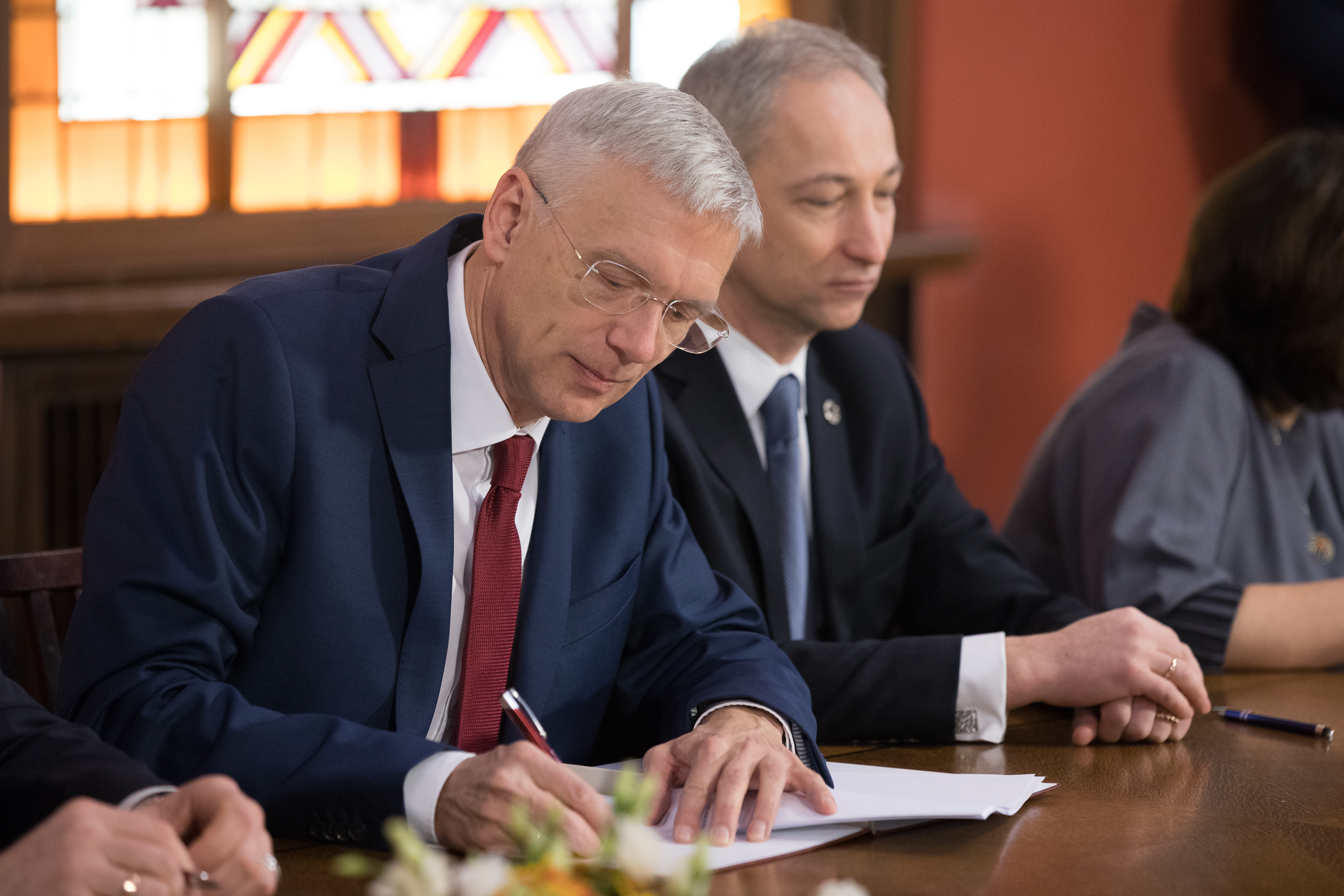
- Krišjānis Kariņš signs the declaration of the government, 23 January 2019
- Date formed: 23 January 2019
- Date dissolved: 14 December 2022

People and organisations
- Head of state: Raimonds Vējonis (2019); Egils Levits (2019–2022)
- Head of government: Krišjānis Kariņš
- Member party: The Conservatives; Development/For! National Alliance; Unity; Who Owns the State? (2019–2021)
- Status in legislature: 2019–2021: Majority Government; 2021–2022: Minority Government
- Opposition party: Social Democratic Party "Harmony"; Union of Greens and Farmers
- Opposition leader: Jānis Urbanovičs; Edgars Tavars; Aldis Gobzems

History
- Election: 2018 Latvian parliamentary election
- Legislature term: 13th Saeima
- Predecessor: Kučinskis cabinet
- Successor: Second Kariņš' cabinet

The first Krišjānis Kariņš' cabinet (Latvian: Kariņa 1. ministru kabinets) was the 40th government of Latvia, sworn in on 23 January 2019 after Krišjānis Kariņš was proposed as Prime Minister by President Raimonds Vējonis and elected by the Saeima and working until 14 December 2022, when Saeima passed a motion of confidence in the Second Kariņš' cabinet.

The government was supported by a coalition of The Conservatives, the Development/For!, the National Alliance, the For a Humane Latvia, and the Unity as was predecessor of Opposition government from Union of Green and Farmers Māris Kučinskis.

In accordance with the Constitution of Latvia, the Cabinet of Ministers, after the first session of the 14th Saeima, has resigned and continued as a caretaker government until a new government was formed.

The cabinet is so far the longest-serving cabinet in the history of democratic Latvia, serving 1421 days and surpassing the previous record of 1077 days set by the Kučinskis cabinet, and the only one in democratic Latvian history to serve a full term of the Saeima.

== Composition ==
The cabinet consisted of Prime Minister Krišjānis Kariņš and thirteen Ministers.

The composition of the Kariņš cabinet was as follows:

Nr.	Office	Image	Incumbent	Party	In Office
	Prime Minister of Latvia Prime Minister of Latvia		Krišjānis Kariņš	New Unity	23 January 2019 – 14 December 2022
1.	Minister for Justice of Latvia; Vice Prime Minister		Jānis Bordāns	The Conservatives	23 January 2019 – 14 December 2022
2.	Minister for Defence of Latvia Minister for Defence; Vice Prime Minister		Artis Pabriks	Development/For!	23 January 2019 – 14 December 2022
3.	Minister for Economics		Ralfs Nemiro	KPV LV	23 January 2019 – 16 March 2020
3.	Minister for Economics		Jānis Vitenbergs	KPV LV	2 April 2020 – 21 April 2021
3.	Minister for Economics		Jānis Vitenbergs	National Alliance	21 April 2021 – 14 May 2021
3.	Minister for Economics		Jānis Vitenbergs	National Alliance	3 June 2021 – 18 May 2022
3.	Minister for Economics		Ilze Indriksone	National Alliance	26 May 2022 – 14 December 2022
4.	Minister for Finance		Jānis Reirs	New Unity	23 January 2019 – 14 December 2022
5.	Minister for Foreign Affairs		Edgars Rinkēvičs	New Unity	23 January 2019 – 14 December 2022
6.	Minister for the Interior		Sandis Ģirģens	KPV LV	23 January 2019 – 3 June 2021
6.	Minister for the Interior		Marija Golubeva	Development/For!	3 June 2021 – 16 May 2022
6.	Minister for the Interior		Kristaps Eklons	Development/For!	26 May 2022 – 14 December 2022
7.	Minister for Education and Science		Ilga Šuplinska	The Conservatives	23 January 2019 – 3 June 2021
7.	Minister for Education and Science		Anita Muižniece	The Conservatives	3 June 2021 – 14 December 2022
8.	Minister for Culture		Dace Melbārde	National Alliance	31 October 2013 – 4 July 2019
8.	Minister for Culture		Nauris Puntulis	National Alliance	8 July 2019 – 14 December 2022
9.	Minister for Welfare		Ramona Petraviča	KPV LV	23 January 2019 – 3 June 2021
9.	Minister for Welfare		Gatis Eglītis	The Conservatives	3 June 2021 – 14 December 2022
10.	Minister for Environmental Protection and Regional Development		Juris Pūce	Development/For!	23 January 2019 – 12 November 2020
10.	Minister for Environmental Protection and Regional Development		Artūrs Toms Plešs	Development/For!	17 December 2020 – 14 December 2022
11.	Minister for Transport		Tālis Linkaits	The Conservatives	23 January 2019 – 14 December 2022
12.	Minister for Health		Ilze Viņķele	Development/For!	23 January 2019 – 7 January 2021
12.	Minister for Health		Daniels Pavļuts	Development/For!	8 January 2021 – 14 December 2022
13.	Minister for Agriculture		Kaspars Gerhards	National Alliance	23 January 2019 – 14 December 2022

== History ==
=== Parking space scandal ===
In November 2020, Minister for Environmental Protection and Regional Development Juris Pūce was involved in scandal, that is infamously called the "Parking space scandal", that lead to his resignation from the post of Minister.

The unusual scandal emerged after Riga City Councilor Māris Mičerevskis, a former party colleague of Pūce's accused him of using a parking spot he was no longer entitled to during an interview on LTV's 'One on One' show.

The next day, Pūce denied trying to get a free municipal parking pass in Riga, claiming that correspondence with Mičerevskis on the subject was just a joke.

However Prime Minister Krišjānis Kariņš failed to see the sunny side of this and said he expected the Corruption Prevention and Combating Bureau (KNAB) to get involved this case. Māris Mičerevskis left the coalition in the Council of Riga claiming it was corrupt.

On 12 November 2020 Juris Pūce resigned, and after fierce talks between Development/For! and Kariņš, Artūrs Toms Plešs was elected as Minister for Environmental Protection and Regional Development. He was the first minister to be born after the full restoration of Latvian independence in 1991.

=== Health Ministers scandal ===
Journalists and members of the public were left stunned as they coped with two simultaneous press briefings on 5 January 2021 following rumors in the morning that Viņķele would be dismissed over dissatisfaction with her vaccination plan.

In one briefing, Ilze Viņķele outlined the Health Ministry's vaccination plans, while at exactly the same time Prime Minister Kariņš was announcing that he had lost confidence in his minister, due to the delay in presenting the vaccination plan she was presenting. He admitted not having read the plan himself, even as it was being presented in the parallel press conference. However, getting rid of Viņķele, whose own press conference seemed an attempt to show that a plan was indeed ready and had the backing of health professionals,

Viņķele herself signalled she would comply with the request to resign, while claiming that the vaccination plan that had been prepared was even more detailed than those adopted by Estonia and Germany.

She was dismissed on 7 January 2021. Although Vice-Prime Minister refused to take on Minister's position it was continued by Artis Pabriks for one day. On 8 January 2021 Daniels Pavļuts was chosen by Development/For! as the new Minister of Health. He was approved by Saeima by 61 votes out of 100.

=== Reshuffle ===
On 21 June 2021, New Unity, the New Conservatives, Development/For!, and the National Alliance signed a new memorandum on the objectives of their mutual cooperation. KPV LV was excluded from newly arranged coalition. This new coalition had 48 members, what meant that government officially became minority one.

== Opinion polling ==
Opinion polling for Latvian PM Krišjānis Kariņš

Fieldwork date	Polling firm/Commissioner	Sample Size	Positive	Negative	No opinion	Total
May 2020	Latvijas Fakti	–	57	29	14	+28
published on May 12th 2020	SKDS/LTV	–	51,8	31,1	17,1	+20,7
April 2020	Latvijas Fakti	–	54	28	18	+26
April 2020	SKDS/LA	–	46,2	30,6	23,2	+15,6
7–26 April 2020	Factum	708	51	17	32	+34
March 2020	Latvijas Fakti	–	48	32	20	+16
February 2020	Latvijas Fakti	–	40	37	23	+3
January 2020	Latvijas Fakti	–	38	38	24	0
December 2019	Latvijas Fakti	–	36	44	20	-8
30 Nov – 11 Dec 2019	SKDS/NRA	1538	–	–	–	-6.4
November 2019	Latvijas Fakti	–	41	35	24	+6
published on November 6th 2019	Kantar TNS	–	–	–	–	4,3/10
October 2019	Latvijas Fakti	–	41	37	22	+4
September 2019	Latvijas Fakti	–	40	29	31	+11
August 2019	Latvijas Fakti	–	43	29	28	+14
July 2019	Latvijas Fakti	–	46	31	23	+15
June 2019	Latvijas Fakti	–	46	28	25	+18
May 2019	Latvijas Fakti	–	41	35	24	+6
April 2019	Latvijas Fakti	–	40	35	25	+5
March 2019	Latvijas Fakti	–	44	30	26	+14
February 2019	Latvijas Fakti	–	39	25	36	+14
February 2019	SKDS/NRA	–	38,0	25,8	36,2	+12,2
January 2019	Latvijas Fakti	–	38	31	31	+7
