= Anita Muižniece =

Latvian politician

Minister of Education and Science.
- In office 3 June 2021 – 14 December 2022
- President: Egils Levits
- Prime Minister: Arturs Krišjānis Kariņš
- Preceded by: Ilga Šuplinska
- Succeeded by: Anda Čakša

Personal details
- Born: 27 November 1987 (age 38) Riga, Latvian SSR, USSR (Now Latvia)
- Party: The Conservatives

Anita Muižniece is a Latvian politician. From June 3, 2021 until December 14, 2022 she served as Minister for Education and Science in the Kariņš cabinet. She is affiliated with The Conservatives She was also member of the 13th Saeima.
