= Tālis Linkaits =

Latvian politician

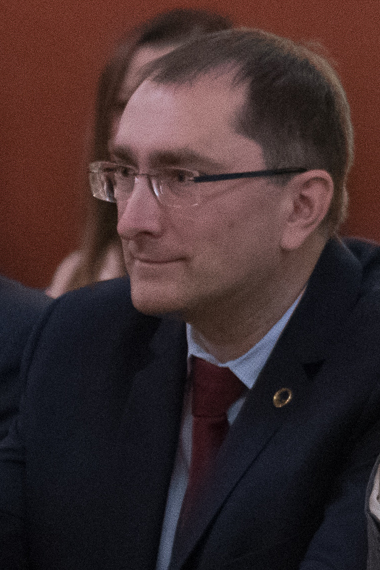

Minister for Transport
- In office 23 January 2019 – 14 December 2022
- President: Raimonds Vējonis Egils Levits
- Prime Minister: Arturs Krišjānis Kariņš
- Preceded by: Uldis Augulis
- Succeeded by: Jānis Vitenbergs

Personal details
- Born: 18 August 1970 (age 56)
- Party: The Conservatives
- Education: University of Latvia

Tālis Linkaits (born 18 August 1970) is a Latvian economist and politician.

He holds a degree in economics from the University of Latvia, and has outstanding experience in public administration and public policy development. He has extensive advisory experience in transition countries, in particular Latvia, Serbia, Montenegro, Kosovo and Moldova.

He was the Head of the VASAB (Vision and Strategies Around the Baltic Sea) Secretariat at the Latvian State Regional Development Agency from 2006-2018.

He participated in creation of Latvian airline airBaltic, served as member of the Board of Directors in 1995-1999 and member of the Supervisory Board of the airline in 1999-2004. He was a freelance Adviser to the Minister for Transport in 2009-2010; and as an Independent Member of the Supervisory Board of SJSC Riga International Airport in 2016-2018.

During the Latvian parliamentary elections 2018 he was elected a member of 13th Saeima.

He served as Minister for Transport in the cabinet of Prime Minister Arturs Krišjānis Kariņš, in 2019-2022.

He was member of The Conservatives party from July 2018 till July 2024.

He assumed the position of the Director of the Transport Community Permanent Secretariat, a EU-funded multinational institution, located in Belgrade, Serbia by 1st of August 2026.
