= Ilga Šuplinska =

Latvian politician

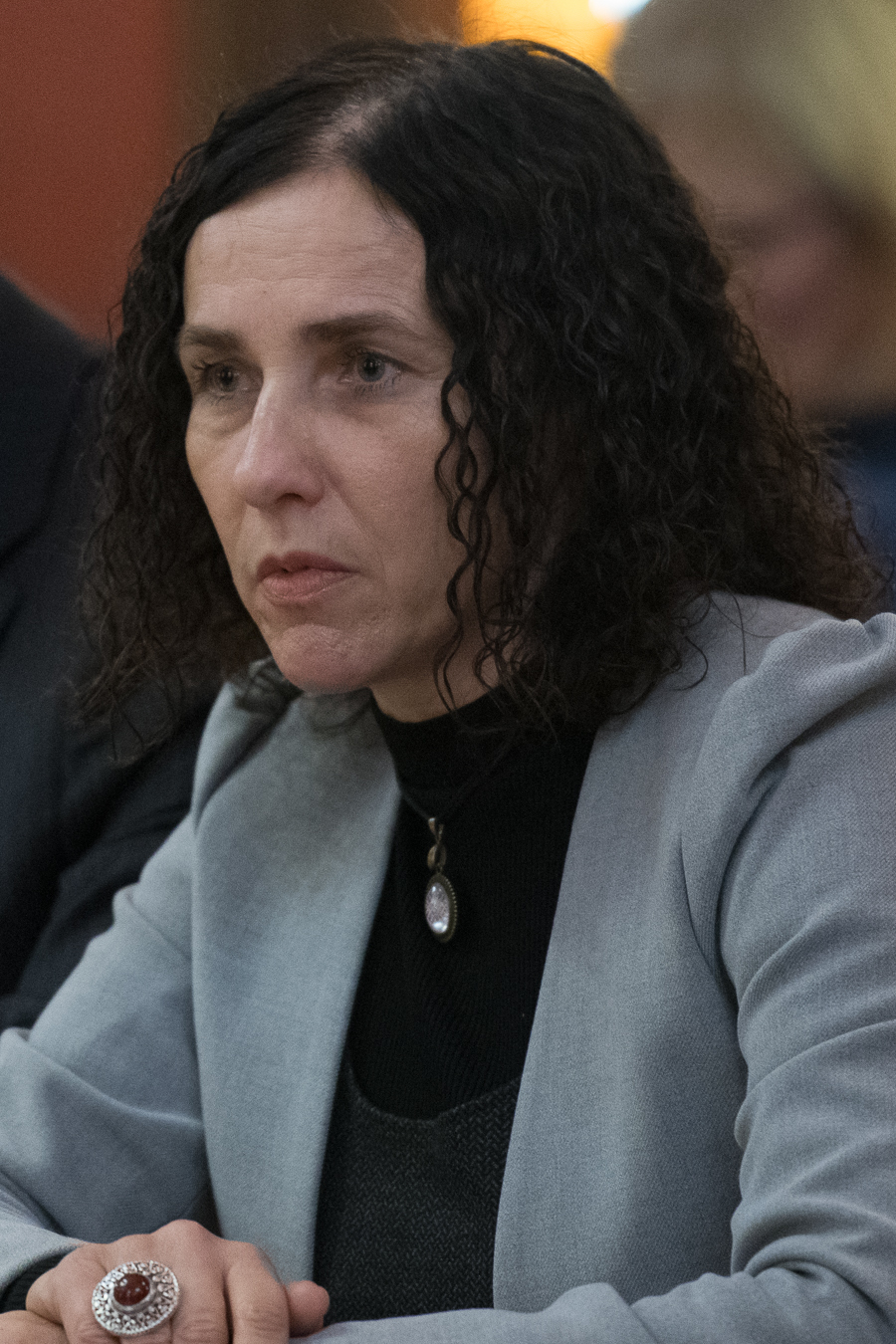

Member of the 13th Saeima
- In office June 8, 2021 – November 1, 2022
- In office November 6, 2018 – January 31, 2019

Minister of Education and Science
- In office January 23, 2019 – June 3, 2021
- President: Raimonds Vējonis; Egils Levits
- Prime Minister: Krišjānis Kariņš
- Preceded by: Kārlis Šadurskis
- Succeeded by: Anita Muižniece

Personal details
- Born: April 16, 1970 (age 56) Dagda, Latvian SSR, USSR (Now Latvia)
- Party: New Conservative Party (2018–2021)

Ilga Šuplinska (born April 16, 1970 in Dagda) is a Latvian politician. From 23 January 2019 to 3 June 2021, she served as Minister for Education and Science in the Kariņš cabinet.
