= Artūrs Toms Plešs =

Latvian politician

- Artūrs Toms Plešs in 2018

Minister for Environmental Protection and Regional Development
- Incumbent
- Assumed office 17 December 2020
- Prime Minister: Arturs Krišjānis Kariņš
- Preceded by: Juris Pūce

Personal details
- Born: 4 January 1992 (age 34)

Artūrs Toms Plešs (born 4 January 1992) is a Latvian politician. As of 17 December 2020, he serves as Minister for Environmental Protection and Regional Development in the cabinet of Prime Minister Arturs Krišjānis Kariņš.
