= List of ministers for education and science of Latvia =

The minister for education and science is a member of the Cabinet of Ministers of Latvia.

== Ministers ==
- Karl Kasparsons, November 18, 1918 - June 11, 1920
- Juris Plakis, June 12, 1920 - April 26, 1921
- Longinus Auseys, April 27 - June 18, 1921
- Alexander Dauge, June 19, 1921 - January 26, 1923
- Pauls Gailītis, January 27 - July 19, 1923
- Stanislavs Jaudzems, July 19 - October 14, 1923
- Hugo Celmins, October 15, 1923 - January 26, 1924
- Karl Straubergs, January 25 - December 17, 1924
- Ernest Felsberg, December 19, 1924 - March 4, 1925
- Arvīds Kalniņš, March 5 - December 23, 1925
- Edmunds Ziemelis, December 24, 1925 - December 18, 1926
- Janis Plieksans, December 19, 1926 - January 23, 1928
- August Tentelis, January 24 - November 30, 1928
- Edmunds Ziemelis, December 1, 1928 - December 5, 1931
- Atis Keninš, December 6, 1931 - June 16, 1933
- Willis Gulbis, June 17, 1933 - March 16, 1934
- Karl Voldemars Beldavs, March 18 - May 15, 1934
- Ludwig Adamowicz, May 18, 1934 - July 10, 1935
- August Tentelis, July 11, 1935 - August 21, 1938
- Julius Auškāps, August 22, 1938 - June 19, 1940
- Paulis Lejins, July 2 - August 25, 1940
- Andris Piebalgs, May 1990 – August 1993
- Jānis Vaivads, August 1993 – May 1995
- Jānis Gaigals, June 1995 – December 1995
- Māris Grīnblats, December 1995 – February 1997
- Juris Celmiņš, February 1997 – April 1998
- Jānis Gaigals, May 1998 – July 1999
- Silva Golde, July 1999 – December 1999
- Māris Vītols, December 1999 – May 2000
- Karlis Greiškalns, May 2000 – November 2002
- Kārlis Šadurskis, November 2002 – March 2004
- Juris Radzevičs, March 2004 - December 2004
- Ina Druviete, December 2004 - April 2006
- Baiba Rivža, April 2006 - December 2007
- Tatjana Koke, December 2007 - November 2010
- Roland Brock, November 2010 - October 2011
- Robert Kilis, October 2011-April 2013
- Vyacheslav Dombrovsky, May 2013 - January 2014
- Ina Druviete, January 2014 - October 2014
- Marit Seile, November 2014 - February 2016
- Kārlis Šadurskis, 11 February 2016 – 27 November 2018
- Jānis Reirs, 27 November 2018 – 23 January 2019
- Ilga Šuplinska, 23 January 2019 – 3 June 2021
- Anita Muižniece, 3 June 2021 – 14 December 2022
- Anda Čakša, 14 December 2022 – 26 February 2025
- Dace Melbārde, 6 March 2025 – 28 May 2026
- Ilze Indriksone, 28 May 2026 - 19 November 2026
- Ceslavs Batņa, 19 November, 2026 - incumbent
