= Linda Liepiņa =

Latvian businesswoman and politician

- Liepiņa in 2018

Member of the Saeima
- Incumbent
- Assumed office 1 November 2022
- In office 6 November 2018 – 17 October 2020

Personal details
- Born: October 8, 1974 (age 52) Riga, Latvia
- Party: LPV (2021–present)
- Other political affiliations: KPV/LV (2016–2019); Independent (2019–2021)
- Education: Baltic International Academy
- Occupation: Politician, businesswoman

Linda Liepiņa (born 8 October 1974) is a Latvian businesswoman and politician. She is a former Member of the Thirteenth Saeima of Latvia (elected from the For a Humane Latvia party, but resigned). She currently represents the "Latvia First" party, which she co-founded in 2021. She has also lived and worked in France.

Liepiņa received her secondary education at Rīgas Natālijas Draudziņas vidusskola. She graduated from the Baltic Russian Institute (now known as the Baltic International Academy) in 2005, obtaining a professional master's degree in business management and administration. Before entering politics, she was an entrepreneur and managed her own companies, Wok Rīga and Wok Tallinn. She has also lived and worked abroad, including in France.

== Political career ==
In 2016, Liepiņa joined the party "Who Owns the State?" and in 2018 was elected to the 13th Saeima on the KPV/LV list. In the Saeima, she aligned with the faction of KPV LV that supported Aldis Gobzems for the office of Prime Minister and opposed the party’s participation in the government led by Krišjānis Kariņš.

In 2019, Liepiņa left the KPV/LV party and its Saeima faction, and became an independent opposition MP. She chaired the 13th Saeima's Requests Committee from the beginning of its work until September 2019. On 16 October 2020, she announced that she was resigning her parliamentary mandate while continuing her political activities.

In August 2021, Liepiņa became one of the founders of the Latvija pirmajā vietā party, established by Ainārs Šlesers. In the 2022 parliamentary election, she was elected to the 14th Saeima.

Liepiņa was a candidate in the 2024 European Parliament election, but was not elected.
