= Anda Čakša =

Latvian paediatrician and politician

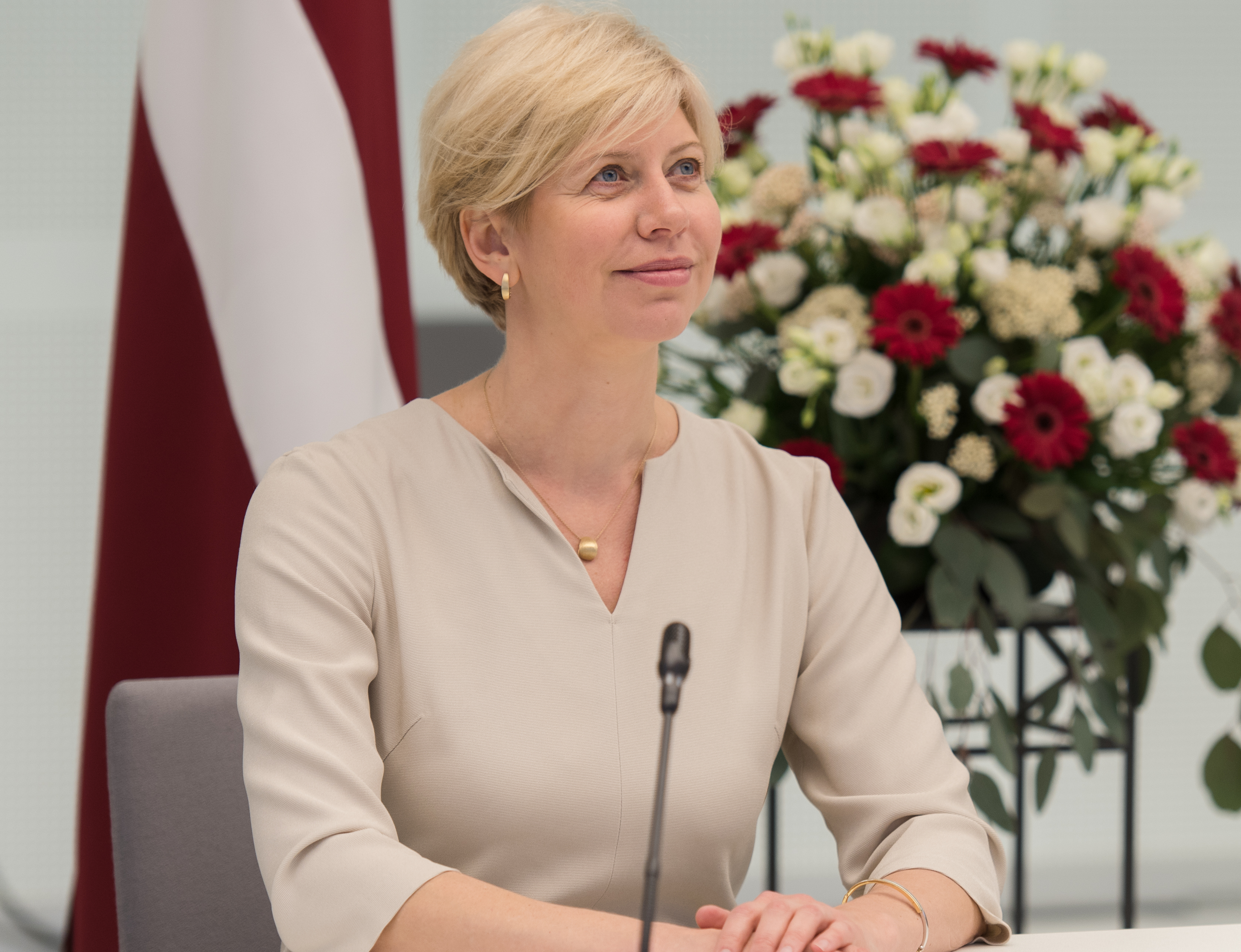
- Čakša in 2020

Minister of Education and Science
- In office 14 December 2022 – 26 February 2025
- Prime Minister: Krišjānis Kariņš; Evika Siliņa
- Preceded by: Anita Muižniece
- Succeeded by: Dace Melbārde

Member of the Saeima
- Incumbent
- Assumed office 6 November 2018

Personal details
- Born: 11 July 1974 (age 52) Sigulda, Latvian SSR
- Party: Unity
- Education: Riga Stradiņš University; RISEBA University of Business, Arts and Technology
- Profession: paediatrician

Anda Čakša (born 11 July 1974) is a Latvian paediatrician and politician. She served as the Minister for Education and Science of Latvia in the Siliņa cabinet from 2022 to 2025.

== Life ==
In 1999, Anda Čakša graduated from the Medical Academy of Latvia, obtaining a doctor's degree. In 2007, she obtained a master's degree in business management at the Riga International University of Economics and Business Administration. She worked at the Bērnu Klīniskā Universitātes Slimnīca, the only specialised children's hospital in Riga.

She was Minister of Health between July 11, 2016, and January 23, 2019, then Minister of Education and Science from December 14, 2022 to February 2025. She is a member of the New Unity alliance.
