= Vita Anda Tērauda =

Latvian politician (born 1962)

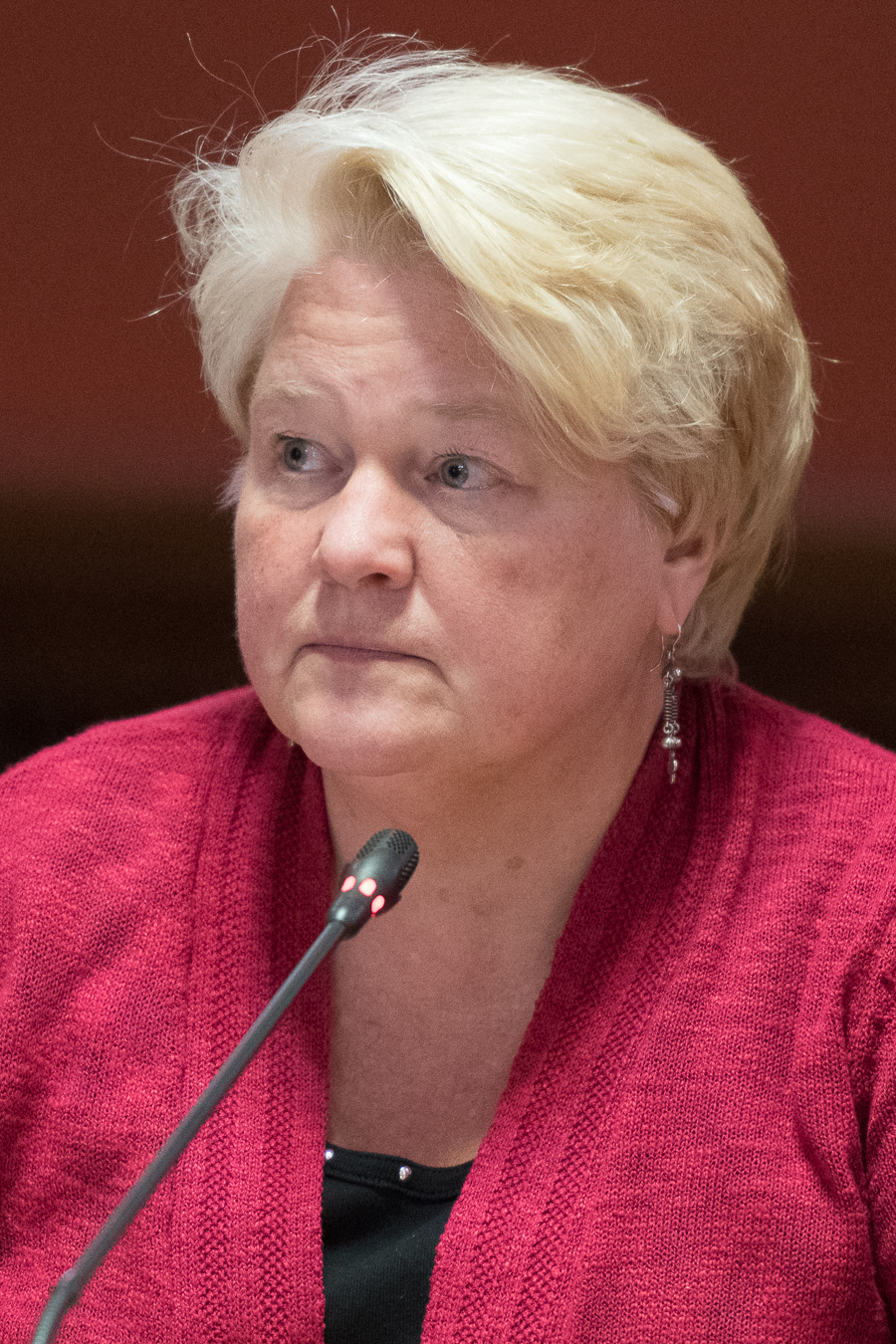

Deputy of the 13th Saeima
- In office November 6, 2018 – November 1, 2022

Personal details
- Born: 19 May 1962 (age 64) Washington, D.C., United States
- Party: Development/For!
- Education: American University; Johns Hopkins University
- Profession: economist

Vita Anda Tērauda (born 19 May 1962) is a Latvian politician elected to the 13th Saeima. Born in the United States, she worked as a radio journalist for Voice of America in Washington, D.C. from 1984 to 1988. Moving to Latvia after the reestablishment of independence in 1991, Tērauda served as Minister for National Reform in the cabinet of Prime Minister Māris Gailis from 1994 to 1995. She is a member of the Development/For! alliance and chairs the European Affairs Committee in the current Saeima.

In 1983, Tērauda received a bachelor's degree in international relations from American University. In 1990, she earned a master's degree in international economics and Soviet politics at Johns Hopkins University.
