= Viesturs Liepkalns =

Latvian politician

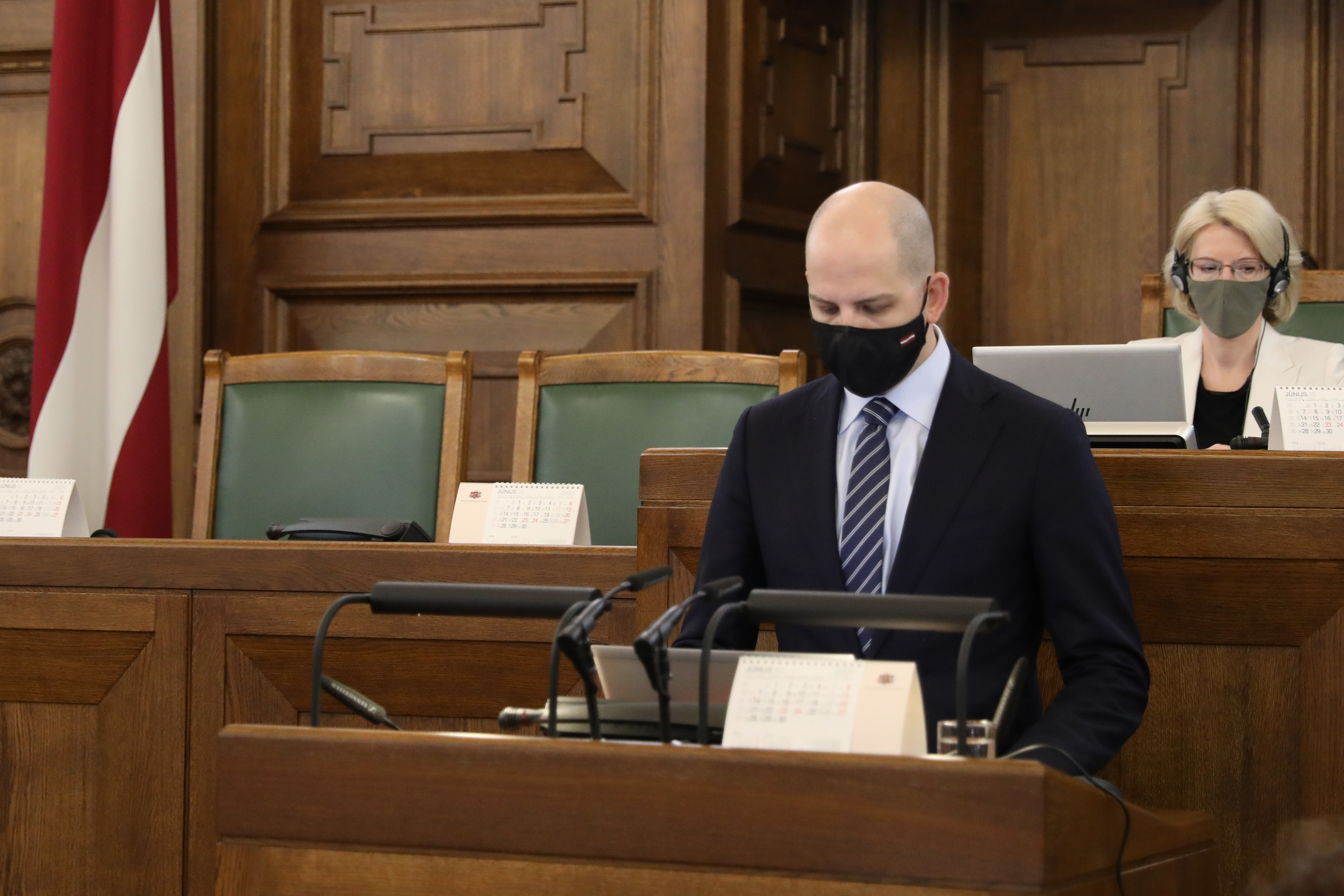

Member of the 13th Saeima
- In office 8 June 2021 – 1 November 2022

Personal details
- Born: 31 May 1988 (age 37); Riga, Latvia
- Political party: For Latvia's Development
- Education: Riga Technical University
- Occupation: Politician

Viesturs Liepkalns (31 May 1988, in Riga, Latvia) is a Latvian entrepreneur and politician. He has been a member of the 13th Saeima, elected from the list of the political party alliance Development/For! in the Vidzeme electoral district. Previously, he served as the Secretary-General (2017–2018) and a board member (2018–2020) of the For Latvia's Development party.

== Biography ==
In 2017 he graduated from the College of Business Administration and in 2021 he graduated from the Faculty of Engineering, Economics and Management of Riga Technical University with a professional bachelor's degree in entrepreneurship and management.

He has also been involved in the construction sector for several years, managing projects at the Environmental Investment Fund, as well as advising the private and public sector on the implementation of European Union projects to improve energy efficiency.

=== Political career ===
Viesturs Liepkalns entered politics in 2013, joining the party For Latvia's Development. In August 2017, he was elected Secretary General of the party For Latvia's Development. In November 2018, he resigned from the position of Secretary General after becoming a member of the Board of the party For Latvia's Development.

In 2017, he ran in the Riga City Council elections on the joint list of the Latvian Association of Regions and the Party for the For Latvia's Development, but was not elected. In April 2018, he became a member of the political party alliance Development/For! and in the same year stood as a candidate in the 13th Saeima elections from the alliance Development/For! He also stood as a candidate in the 2020 extraordinary elections to the Riga City Council on the list of the association Development/For! and The Progressives joint list, but was not elected.

On 8 June 2021, after the death of Inese Ikstena, he became a Member of the 13th Saeima for the time that Artis Pabriks was serving as a minister. In the 14th Saeima elections of 2022, he ran as a candidate for the Development/For! list, but failed to break the 5% barrier.
