= Jānis Iesalnieks =

Latvian politician

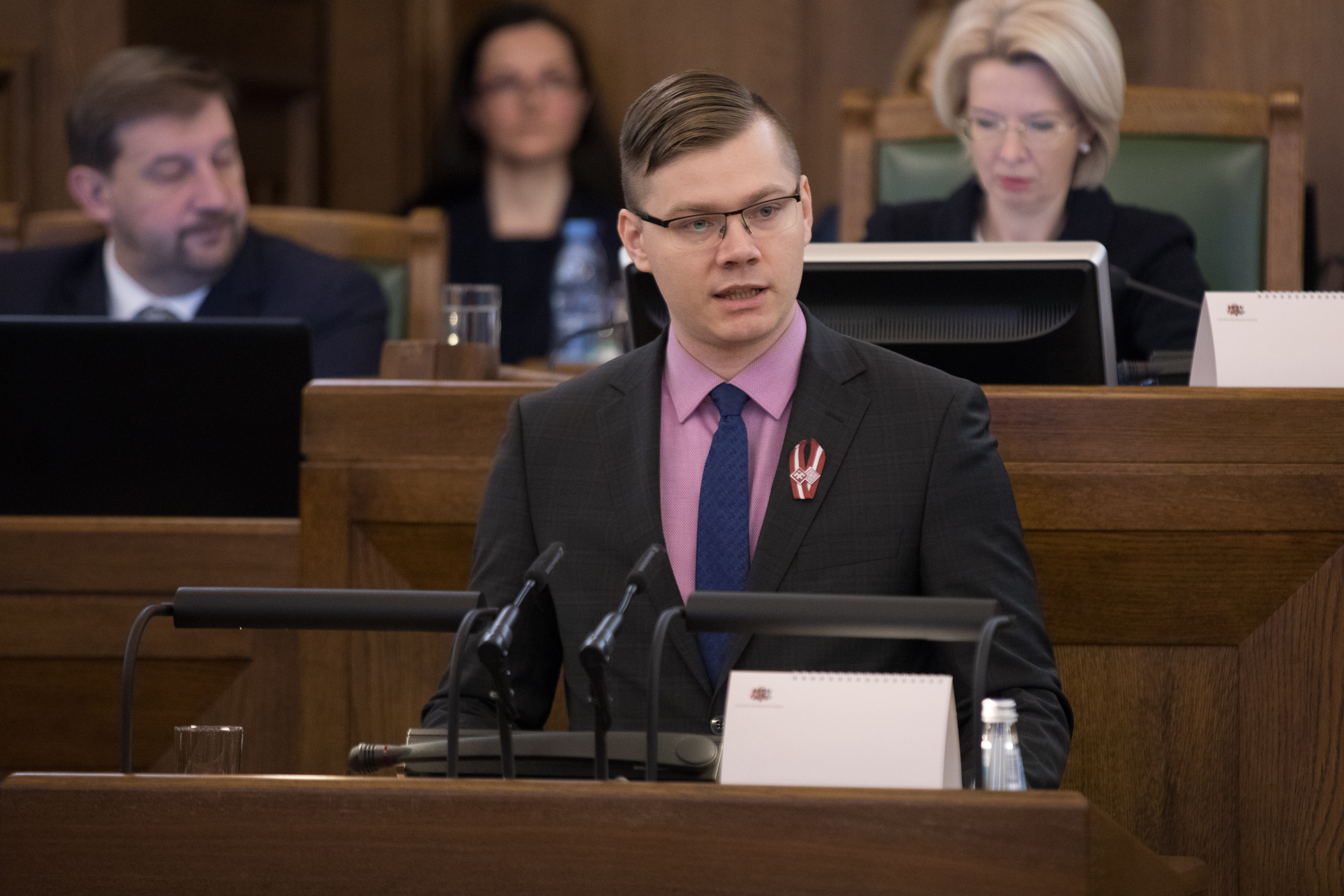
- Jānis Iesalnieks in 2019

Member of the Saeima
- Incumbent
- Assumed office July 8, 2019

Personal details
- Born: 7 July 1984 (age 42) Ventspils, Latvian SSR, Soviet Union
- Party: All for Latvia! (2006–2011); National Alliance (Latvia) (2011–present)
- Children: 3
- Education: University of Latvia
- Occupation: Lawyer

Jānis Iesalnieks is a Latvian lawyer, former politician and former Parliamentary Secretary of Minister of Justice, and currently is Member of the 13th Saeima.

== Controversy ==
After the 2011 Norway attacks, he tweeted "The Norwegian victims are entirely on the conscience of multiculturalists - their islamization policy led to someone simply going crazy". The same day Iesalnieks issued a statement where he denied justifying the actions of Anders Breivik, but later announced he would be stepping down as the party's board member and not running for the 2011 Latvian parliamentary election.
