= Ralfs Nemiro =

Latvian politician (born 1981)

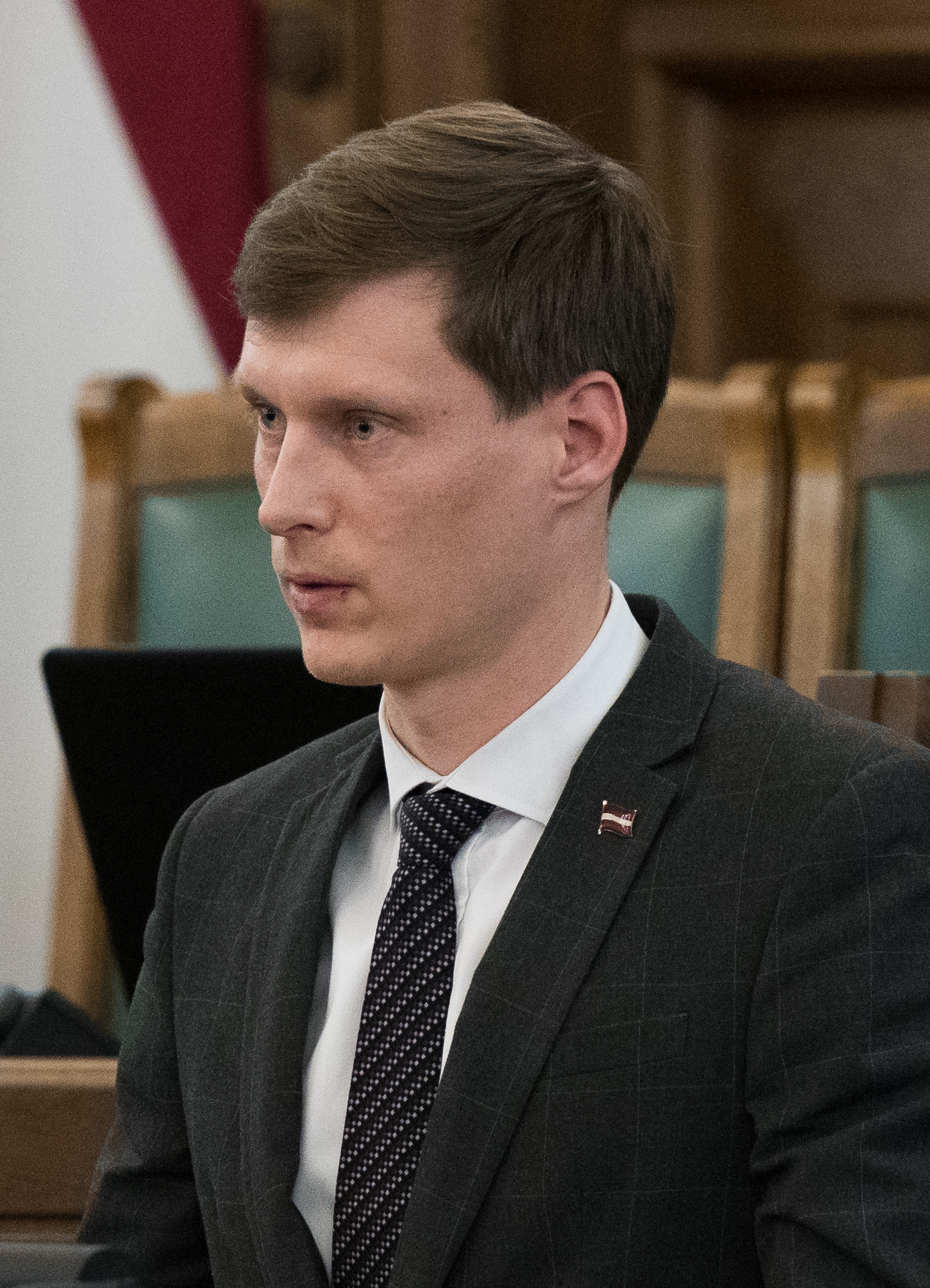
- Nemiro in 2018

Member of the 13th Saeima
- In office November 6, 2018 – November 1, 2022

Minister of Economics
- In office January 31, 2019 – March 20, 2020
- Prime Minister: Arturs Krišjānis Kariņš
- Preceded by: Arvils Ašeradens
- Succeeded by: Jānis Vitenbergs

Personal details
- Born: 9 February 1981 (age 45) Riga, Latvian SSR, Soviet Union

Ralfs Nemiro (born 9 February 1981 in Riga) is a Latvian politician. Nemiro is the former Economics Minister of Latvia. He stepped down from the role after his security clearance to access state secrets was revoked.
