= Igor Pimenov =

Latvian Russian politician

Igor Pimenovs
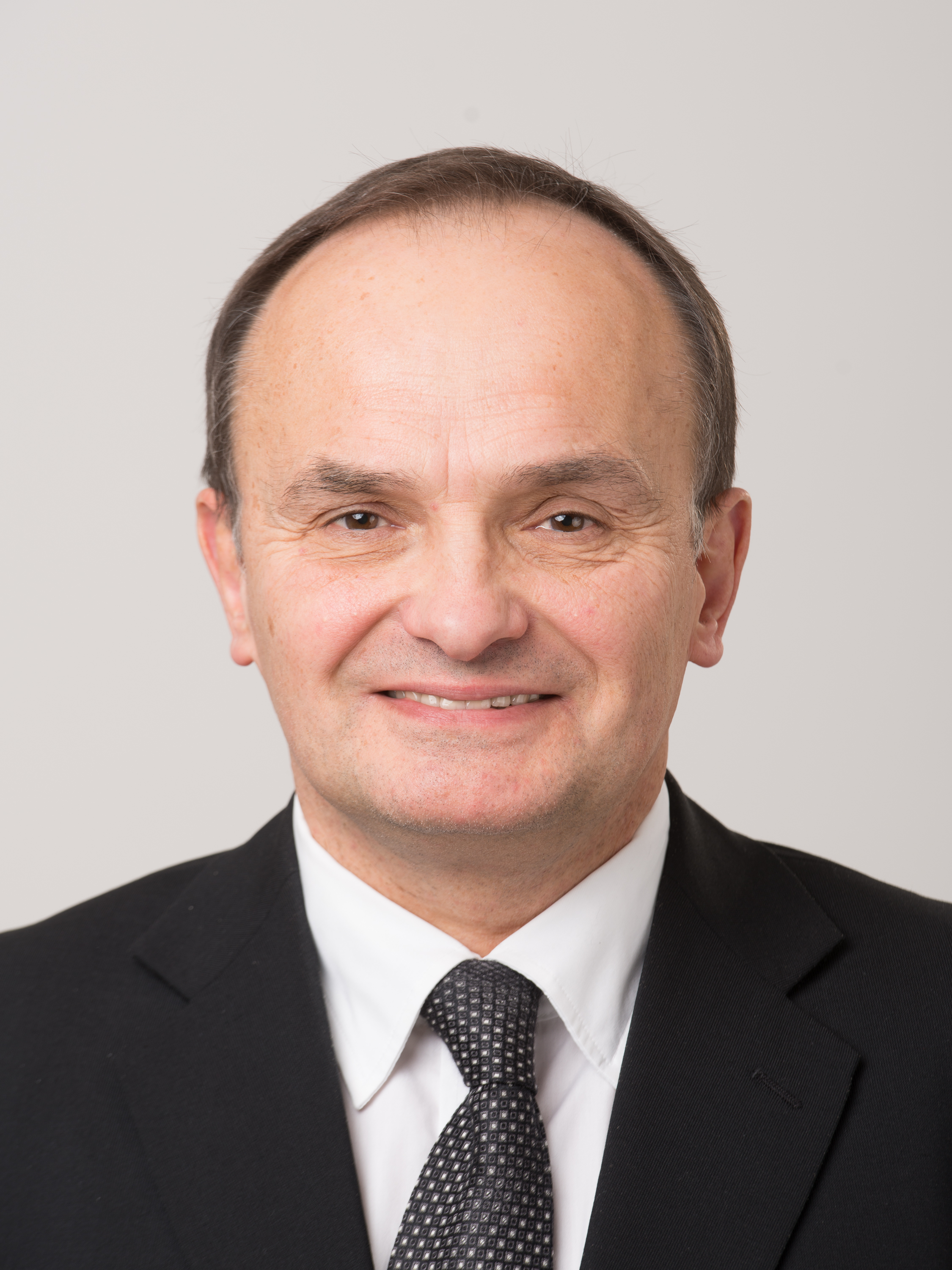

Member of the Saeima
- In office 16 July 2009 – 1 November 2022

Member of the Riga City Council
- In office 29 March 2005 – 1 July 2009

Personal details
- Born: 31 January 1953 (age 73) Rīga, Latvian SSR
- Party: Harmony
- Education: Latvian State University
- Profession: computer specialist

Igors Pimenovs (Russian: Игорь Витальевич Пименов}; born 1953) is a Latvian politician who had served as a member of Harmony and a deputy of the Saeima from 2009 to 2022.
