= Vladimirs Nikonovs =

Latvian politician

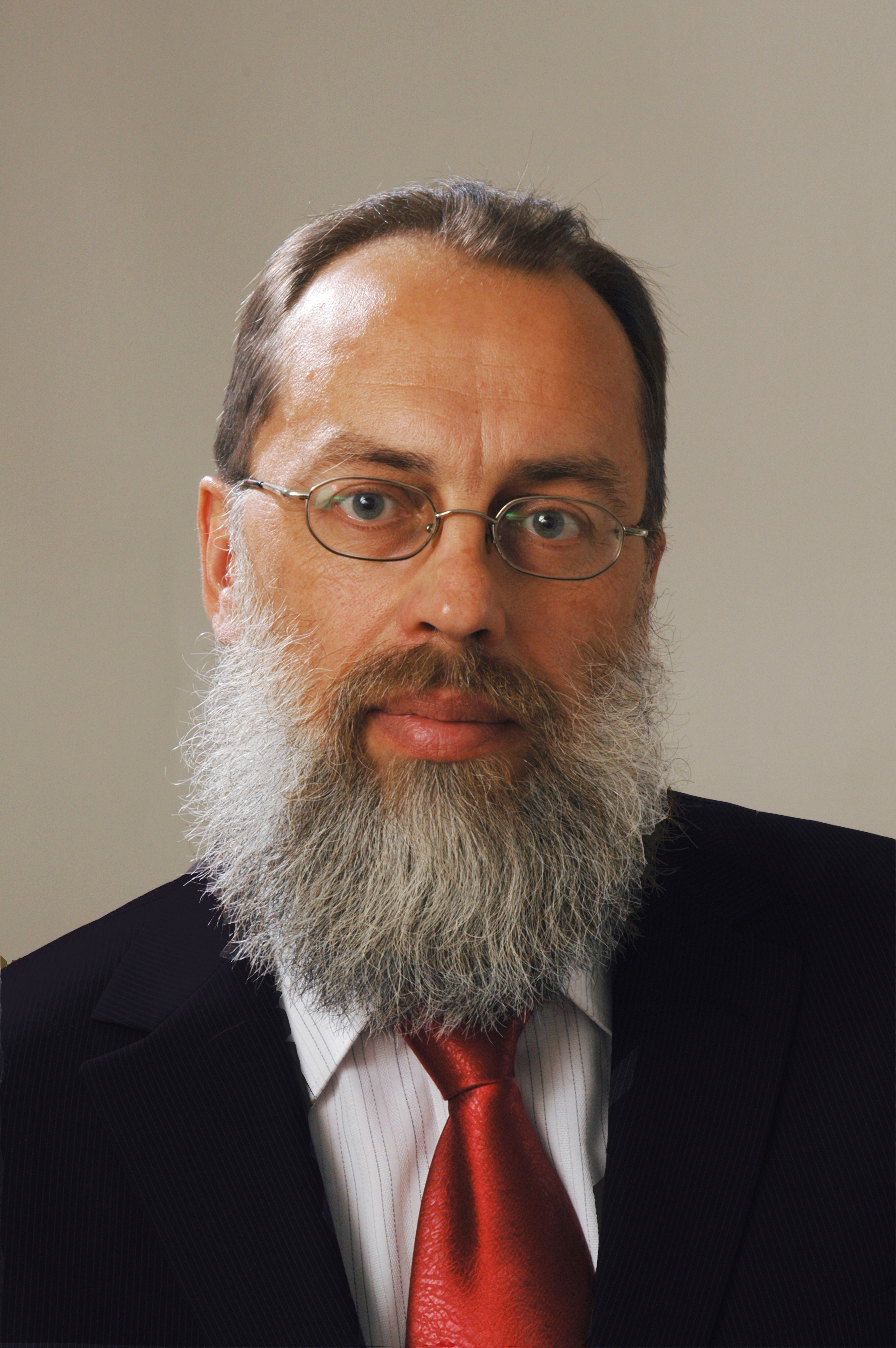

Deputy of the Saeima
- Incumbent
- Assumed office 2010

Personal details
- Born: 4 April 1955 (age 71) Rēzekne, Latvian SSR
- Party: Harmony

Vladimirs Nikonovs (born 1955) is a Latvian politician. He is a member of Harmony and a deputy of the 12th Saeima. He is a member of the Old Believers Russian Orthodox community in Latvia.
