= New Conservative Party (Latvia) =

Political party in Latvia

New Conservative Party Jaunā konservatīvā partija
- Abbreviation: JKP
- Leader: Sigords Stradiņš
- Founder: Jānis Bordāns
- Founded: 17 May 2014; 12 years ago
- Split from: National Alliance
- Headquarters: Riga, Latvia
- Membership (2019): 1,074
- Ideology: Liberal conservatism
- Political position: Centre-right
- Colours: Dark blue
- Saeima: 0 / 100
- European Parliament: 0 / 9

Website
- konservativie.lv

The New Conservative Party (Latvian: Jaunā konservatīvā partija, JKP), known as The Conservatives (Latvian: Konservatīvie, K) from February 2022 to October 2023, is a liberal-conservative political party in Latvia.

It was formed on 17 May 2014. Jānis Bordāns was chosen as the leader on the founding assembly. The Conservatives is a conservative party, and it is positioned on the centre-right on the political spectrum. It has embraced its main appeal on anti-corruption policies. Due to its rapid transformation, it succeeded in winning seats in the 2017 municipal elections. In the 2018 parliamentary election they placed third by winning 16 seats. During their stint in the 13th Saeima, in 2022 the party voted supported an ultimately unsuccessful bill to introduce civil unions to the country, which would allow the recognition of same-sex unions in Latvia. The similar partnership law was approved by the next Saeima in 2023.

After unsatisfactory results in the 2019 European and 2022 Latvian elections, Bordāns announced his retirement from politics and was replaced by former Minister of Welfare Gatis Eglītis.

As of 28 September 2024 the party is led by Dagmāra Beitnere-Le Galla, the former Deputy Speaker of the Saeima.

== Election results ==
=== Legislative elections ===
Election	Party leader	Performance					Rank	Government
Election	Party leader	Votes	%	± pp	Seats	+/–	Rank	Government
2014	Jānis Bordāns	6,389	0.70	New	0 / 100	New	10th	Extra-parliamentary
2018	Jānis Bordāns	114,694	13.67	▲12.97	16 / 100	▲16	▲3rd	Coalition
2022	Jānis Bordāns	28,270	3.13	▼10.54	0 / 100	▼16	▼13th	Extra-parliamentary
2026	Sigords Stradiņš	2,628	0.33	▼2.80	0 / 100	0	▼14th	Extra-parliamentary

=== European Parliament elections ===
Election	List leader	Votes	%	Seats	+/–	EP Group
2019	Andis Kudors	20,595	4.38 (#8)	0 / 8	New	–
2024	Tālis Linkaits	7,799	1.52 (#13)	0 / 9	0	–
