= Krišjānis Kariņš =

Prime Minister of Latvia from 2019 to 2023

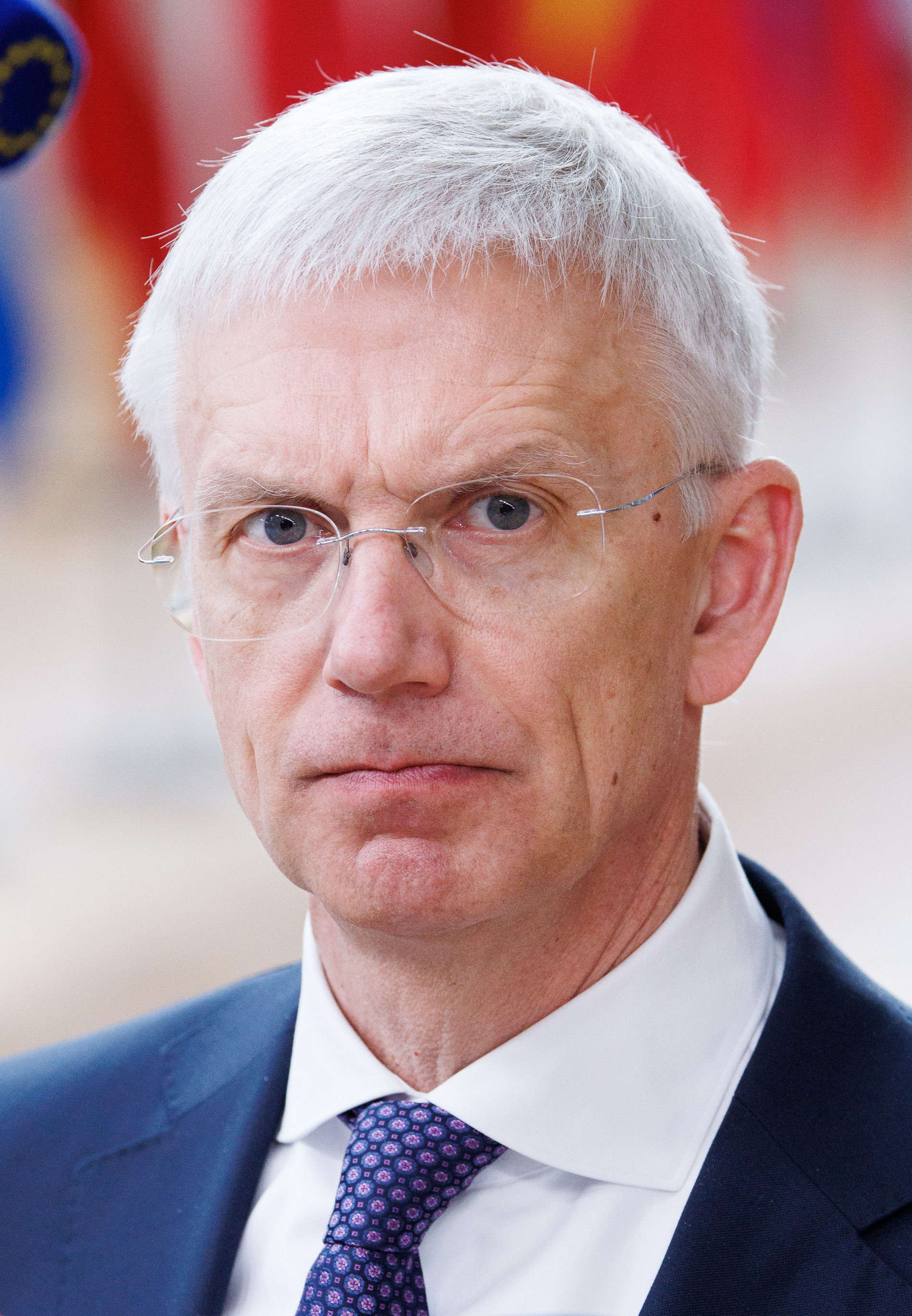
- Kariņš in 2023

23rd Prime Minister of Latvia
- In office 23 January 2019 – 15 September 2023
- President: Raimonds Vējonis; Egils Levits; Edgars Rinkēvičs
- Preceded by: Māris Kučinskis
- Succeeded by: Evika Siliņa

Minister of Foreign Affairs
- In office 15 September 2023 (Note: Acting between 8 July 2023 and 15 September 2023 after previous minister Rinkēvičs was elected President of Latvia) – 10 April 2024; Acting: 8 July – 15 September 2023
- Prime Minister: Himself; Evika Siliņa
- Preceded by: Edgars Rinkēvičs
- Succeeded by: Baiba Braže

Member of the European Parliament
- In office 14 July 2009 – 23 January 2019
- Constituency: Latvia

Minister for Economics
- In office 2 December 2004 – 7 April 2006
- Prime Minister: Aigars Kalvītis
- Preceded by: Juris Lujāns
- Succeeded by: Aigars Štokenbergs

President of the Committee of Ministers of the Council of Europe
- In office 8 July 2023 – 15 November 2023
- Preceded by: Edgars Rinkēvičs
- Succeeded by: Dominique Hasler

Member of the Saeima
- In office 5 November 2002 – 16 July 2009
- In office 25 April 2024 – 29 August 2024

Personal details
- Born: 13 December 1964 (age 61) Wilmington, Delaware, U.S.
- Citizenship: Latvia; United States
- Party: New Era Party (2002–2011); Unity (2011–present)
- Spouse: Anda Kariņa
- Children: 4
- Education: St. John's College, Maryland; University of Pennsylvania (BA, MA, PhD)
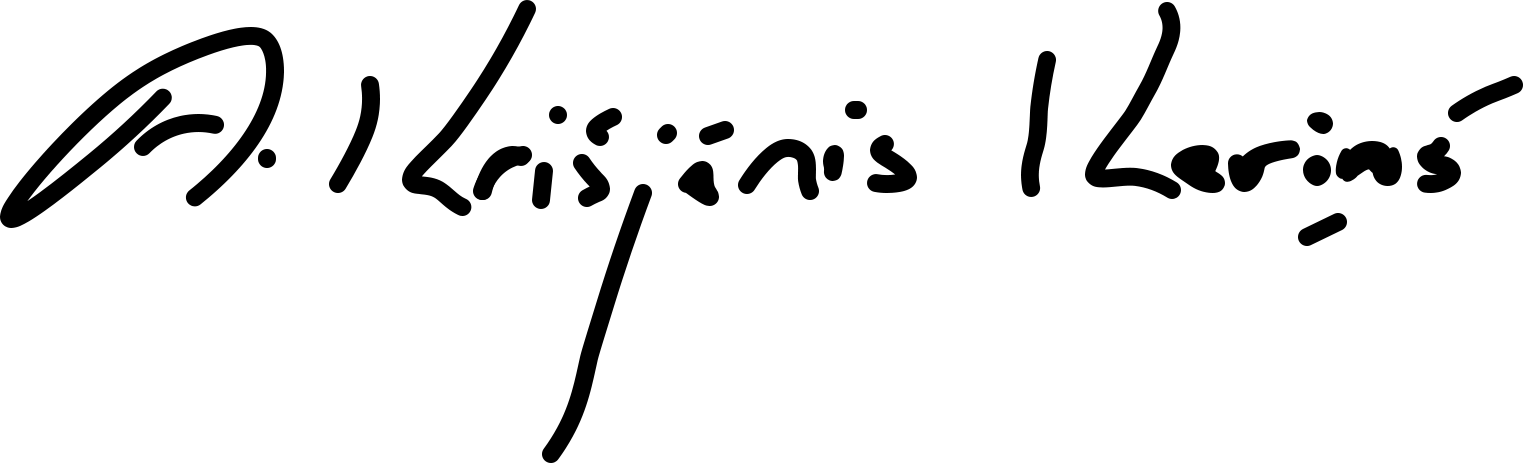
- Signature
- Website: Official website

Arturs Krišjānis Kariņš (Latvian: [ˈarturs ˈkriʃjaːnis ˈkariɲʃ]; born 13 December 1964) is a Latvian and American politician who served as the prime minister of Latvia from 2019 until 2023. A linguist and businessman by profession, he previously served as Latvia's minister of Economics and a Member of the European Parliament. Born in Wilmington, Delaware, United States, to parents who had left Latvia during the Soviet occupation, he was active in the American Latvian community throughout his youth.

After graduating with a bachelor's degree summa cum laude and PhD in linguistics from the University of Pennsylvania, Kariņš moved to Latvia in 1997 and founded a frozen food business. He helped found the New Era Party in 2002, which in 2011 merged with others to form the Unity Party (renamed New Unity in 2018). After serving as a deputy in Latvia's parliament (the Saeima), as Minister of Economics, and also as a Member of the European Parliament throughout the 2000s and 2010s, Kariņš was selected by New Unity to be its prime ministerial candidate in the 2018 Latvian parliamentary election. Following the election, New Unity was the smallest party elected to the 13th Saeima.

Following months of contentious negotiations in which leaders of the larger parties were unable to form a coalition, Kariņš was nominated by President Raimonds Vējonis in January 2019 as a compromise candidate to form a government. He took office on 23 January 2019 at the head of a five-party coalition, and survived a 58–33 vote of no confidence on 11 April 2019. During his tenure, he led the country's response to the COVID-19 pandemic, as well as the 2021 Belarus–European Union border crisis.

He announced his resignation as prime minister on 14 August 2023 due to conflicts within the coalition led by his party and left office upon election of his successor on 15 September 2023.

== Early life ==
Kariņš was born in Wilmington, Delaware, United States, to a Latvian American family. As child refugees, his parents, with their respective families, fled the Soviet re-occupation of Latvia in 1944, grew up, met and married in Sweden before migrating to the United States. His father, Uldis, was a civil engineer who in 1973 founded the engineering, planning and surveying firm Karins and Associates in Delaware, which would later go on to acquire other companies in the Mid-Atlantic region.

According to Kariņš, he and his older sister were the only two ethnic Latvian children in their elementary school. His family was active in Delaware's Latvian community, regularly attending Latvian church and Sunday school, singing in Latvian choirs, and attending and later working at Latvian summer camps including Garezers in Michigan. Throughout his youth, Kariņš played guitar and drums with his Latvian friends in a band that traveled throughout the United States and played at events such as weddings. He also took part in demonstrations in Washington, D.C., against the Soviet occupation. Kariņš first visited Latvia in 1984 and he spent summers there until moving to the country full-time in 1997.

== Education and business career ==
After graduating from high school, Kariņš studied at the Münster Latvian Gymnasium in 1983. One of his teachers was Egils Levits, who was elected President of Latvia in 2019 a few months after Kariņš would become prime minister. From 1984 to 1986, he studied at St. John's College in Annapolis, Maryland, before switching to a linguistics program at the University of Pennsylvania where he graduated summa cum laude in 1988. In 1990, he received a grant from the American government to take Russian language classes in Leningrad, and in 1994, he received another government scholarship to study pitch accents and to teach sociolinguistics courses as a guest lecturer at the University of Latvia. In 1996, Kariņš finished a Ph.D. in linguistics from the University of Pennsylvania and specialized in the field of automatic speech recognition.

Soon after, he moved to Latvia, where he intended on teaching language but was denied a teaching position as an academic due to inexperience in teaching. Instead, he founded Lāču ledus, a producer and distributor of ice and frozen foods, that he led until 2002. According to Kariņš, negative experiences working with the Latvian bureaucracy during his time in business was his original inspiration for joining Latvian politics. He was also briefly the president of an automobile and office supplies company called Formula from 1999 to 2000.

== Political career ==
=== New Era Party, Saeima deputy and Minister for Economics ===
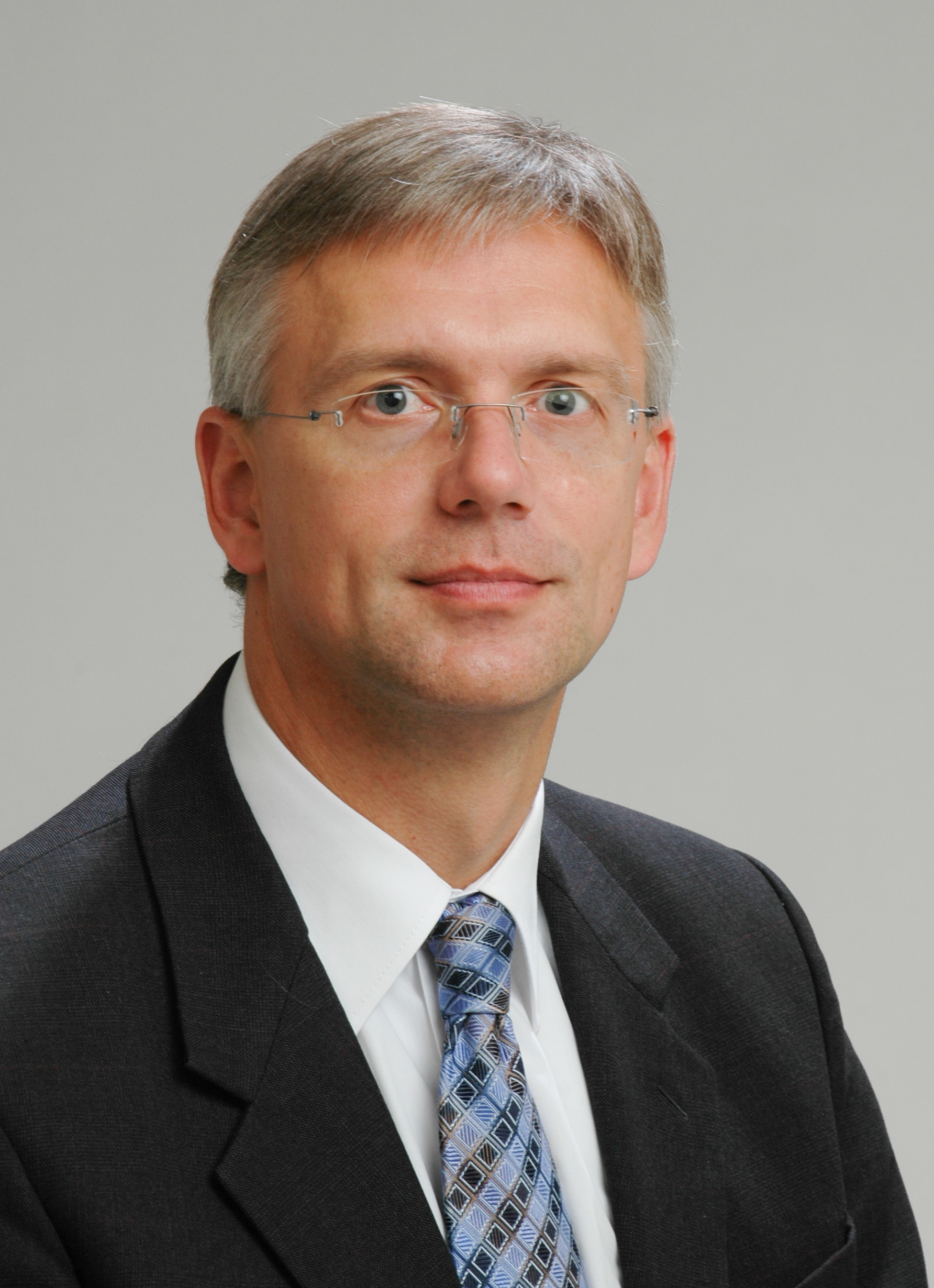
Kariņš's official photo as a member of the 9th Saeima

In the early 2000s, Einars Repše invited Kariņš to take part in the founding of the New Era Party, and Kariņš helped write the party's original platform. He was elected to the Saeima on the party's ticket in October 2002, with New Era becoming the single largest party in parliament. While in the Saeima, he served on the education, culture, and science committee as well as on the constitutional committee. He also served as the chairman of the parliamentary faction of New Era from 2002 to 2004.

Upon the resignation of prime minister Einars Repše in early 2004, Kariņš was discussed as a candidate to become the next prime minister. However, he was passed over by President Vaira Vīķe-Freiberga in favor of Indulis Emsis, and again in favor of Aigars Kalvitīs after Emsis's resignation a few months later. He instead became Minister for Economics in the First Kalvītis cabinet from December 2004 to April 2006. According to Kariņš, he had a contentious relationship with Kalvītis during his time as minister. In April 2006, Kariņš was threatened with prosecution due to his relationship with a company that allegedly misused EU funds. Although Kariņš initially refused to resign, his entire New Era party left the government on 6 April 2006 due to an ongoing conflict with Kalvītis and his People's Party.

Kariņš was re-elected to the Saeima on 7 October 2006. Although New Era was tied for the second largest party in parliament with 18 seats, the party did not re-join Kalvītis's coalition and remained in opposition. In March 2007 Kariņš became one of two co-leaders of New Era together with Repše. When New Era voted to merge with the Unity party in July 2011, Kariņš became a member of Unity. In July 2017, he criticized five members of parliament who left Unity for the new For! party as being primarily motivated by their re-election prospects, and indicated that he would not be leaving the party as his "values had not changed." He remained a member when the party was renamed "New Unity" in April 2018.

=== Member of European Parliament ===
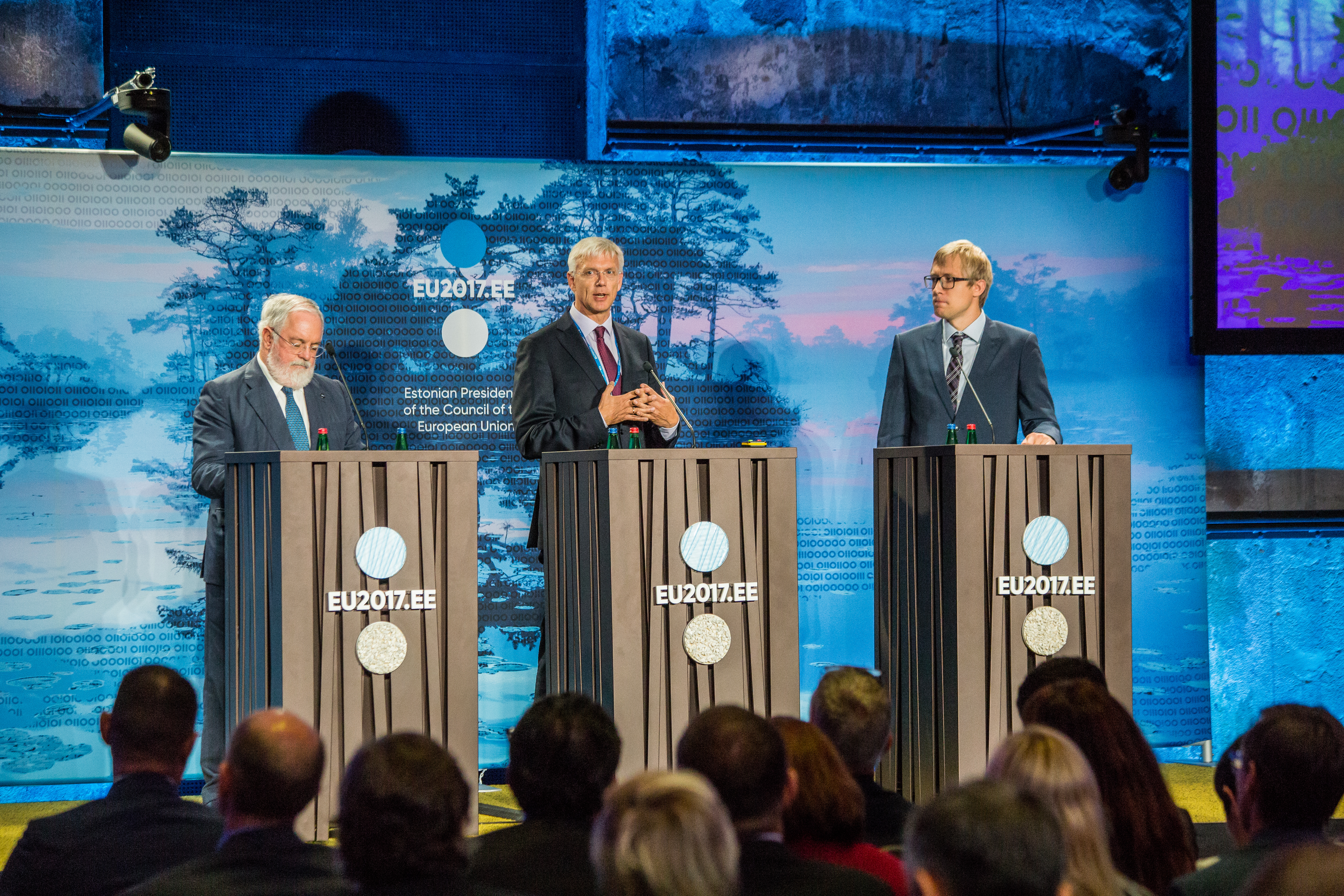
Kariņš as a Member of European Parliament at a high-level conference on the European energy market

In July 2009, Kariņš became a Member of European Parliament. He was a Member of the Committee on Industry, Research and Energy, substitute in the Committee on Economic and Monetary Affairs and was a substitute in the Special Committee on Tax Rulings and Other Measures Similar in Nature or Effect. In the Parliament he was part of the European People's Party, the largest political grouping the parliament. He was also a member of the Reconciliation of European Histories Group. Kariņš was re-elected at the 2014 European Parliament election.

In a May 2015 interview, Kariņš argued in favor of Latvia accepting its controversial quota of refugees proposed by the European Union in order to alleviate the European migrant crisis, saying that in the future Latvia would expect help from other EU countries in settling Ukrainian migrants from a potential major crisis.

When Kariņš assumed the prime ministership, Aleksejs Loskutovs took his seat in European Parliament.

==== Committee assignments ====
- Industry, Research and Energy
- Committee of Inquiry into Emission Measurements in the Automotive Sector
- Special committee on financial crimes, tax evasion and tax avoidance

=== 2018 candidacy for Prime Minister ===
On 23 April 2018, Kariņš was announced as New Unity's candidate for the Latvian premiership for the 2018 election. He decided not to run for election to the Saeima, instead choosing to maintain his seat in the European Parliament. In announcing his candidacy, he criticized the Kučinskis government as "foolish," even though five of the thirteen ministers were fellow members of New Unity. Despite polls predicting as late as July that New Unity would not receive the minimum 5% share of the vote necessary for election to the Saeima, the party was able to stage a comeback and on 6 October it entered the Saeima as the smallest of seven parties, with just eight seats.

On 7 January 2019, he was tasked by Latvian President Raimonds Vējonis with forming the next government, following the failures of previous nominees Jānis Bordāns and Aldis Gobzems in a contentious negotiation process. In accepting the nomination, Kariņš announced that his government's priorities would include financial sector reform, education reform, anti-corruption action, and liquidation of a controversial green energy surcharge that had been abused by companies in previous years. The mayor of Ventspils, Aivars Lembergs, called on Kariņš, a dual citizen of both the United States and Latvia, to give up his American citizenship while prime minister, but he refused to do so.

Kariņš took office as prime minister on 23 January 2019, leading a broad centre-right coalition of five conservative and liberal parties that includes KPV LV, New Conservative Party, Development/For!, National Alliance and New Unity. The Union of Greens and Farmers and Harmony parties went into opposition, as did independent Member of Parliament Jūlija Stepaņenko.

=== 2019 European elections ===
Kariņš led his party into the 2019 European Parliament elections in Latvia. His party lost half of their seats, going to 2 from 4.

=== 2022 candidacy for Prime Minister ===
In June 2022, the New Unity party announced that Kariņš would once again serve as their candidate for prime minister. On September 9, the Latvian Association of Journalists criticized Kariņš for not participating in public debates and being overly selective for which interview programs he appeared on.

== Prime minister ==
Opinion polling for Latvian PM Krišjānis Kariņš

Kariņš and Deputy Prime Minister Jānis Bordāns signing the coalition agreement that would form the Kariņš cabinet in January 2019.

During his confirmation session, Kariņš promised that his government would be "evolutionary, not revolutionary”, and announced a seven-point program that prioritized financial sector reform, implementing anti-corruption measures, continuing the Kučinskis government's education reforms, improving but not overhauling the health care system, eliminating the controversial green energy subsidy, reducing the number of administrative divisions, and addressing "demographic issues." On 5 April 2019, he supported Minister of Environmental Protection and Regional Development Juris Pūce's action in dismissing long-serving Mayor of Riga Nils Ušakovs from his position due to multiple violations of the law.

=== Domestic policy ===
==== Financial sector reform ====
On 13 June 2019, the Saeima approved measures that allowed Latvian institutions to implement UN sanctions more quickly, reduced the Financial and Capital Market Commission from five members to just three, and made these commissioners' positions subject to appointment by parliament. Commission chairman Peters Putniņš protested that the measures would allow politicians to have greater control of what should be a non-political regulatory body.

==== Education ====
Upon his confirmation, Kariņš announced that his government would continue implementing reforms that had been planned by the previous government led by Māris Kučinskis. These included the reorganization and liquidation of schools that had low numbers of students, the gradual transition to Latvian-only education in public high schools, and new competence-based curriculum standards.

On 7 February 2019, Kariņš announced that there would be no increase in 2019 to teachers' salaries as promised according to a timetable agreed upon by the Latvian teachers' union and the Kučinskis cabinet. This led to a picket protest on 20 March, as well as the threat of an indefinite strike later that year. In an interview on 28 February, Kariņš expressed a wish to raise teachers' salaries without having to raise taxes, finding savings by liquidating and consolidating schools with low numbers of students. On 30 March, Minister for Education Inga Šuplinska claimed that money to finance the planned wage increases could be found by mid-May.

In April 2019, the Kariņš government announced a proposal for four tiers of minimum student numbers for schools based on the municipality's size and location. According to Šuplinska, roughly half of Latvia's schools would not meet the minimum requirements under the plan.

On 23 April 2019, the Constitutional Court of Latvia ruled that the planned transition to Latvian as the sole language of instruction in public schools did not violate the constitution. In June 2022, Saeima approved a government proposal to accelerate the transition to Latvian language-only instruction at preschool and primary levels of the education system so that it would be completed by the year 2025.

On 16 September 2022, a strike by education sector workers was narrowly avoided when a compromise agreement to raise teachers' salaries and balance their workloads between contact hours and preparation hours was reached between the Kariņš government and the Latvian Trade Union of Education and Science Employees just three days before the indefinite strike was set to begin.

Prime Minister Krišjānis Kariņš along with President Raimonds Vējonis, Speaker of the Saeima Ināra Mūrniece and Chief Justice of the Constitutional Court Ineta Ziemele taking part on 4 May 2019 event to celebrate the restoration of Latvian independence in 1990

==== Health care reform ====
In February 2019, the Kariņš government announced that it would abandon the "two basket" system of health care funding that the Kučinskis government had begun to implement, a reform which would have made full access to state-provided health care only available to people paying social contribution taxes. The government announced in April 2019 that the health care system and tax code would both be reformed in 2021.

==== Green energy subsidy ====
On 11 April 2019, he survived a 58-33 vote of no confidence spearheaded by Saeima Deputy Aldis Gobzems for not adhering to the Saeima's demand that his government cancel the green energy subsidy by the end of March. On that day, in a phone interview with Latvian Public Radio, he committed to canceling the subsidy within a reasonable timeframe and argued that the Minister of Economics, Ralfs Nemiro, Gobzems's former party member, had already published a report proving that doing so by the end of March was a legal impossibility.

==== Administrative territory reform ====
On 9 April 2019, Minister of Environmental Protection and Regional Development Juris Pūce announced a controversial plan for the Kariņš government to reduce the number of municipalities in Latvia from 119 to 35, eliminating the "republican city" status for all cities aside from the capital of Rīga. The government attempted to block the town of Ikšķile from holding a survey regarding citizen's opinions about the reform, claiming that municipalities only have the legal right to hold public debates on municipal issues, but the survey continued as planned and found that 98.45% of respondents were opposed to the reforms. After a number of amendments, such as granting ten cities the status of "national city" with seven remaining separate municipalities and increasing the amount of municipalities to 43 overall, the new system of municipalities came into effect on 1 July 2021.

=== Foreign policy ===
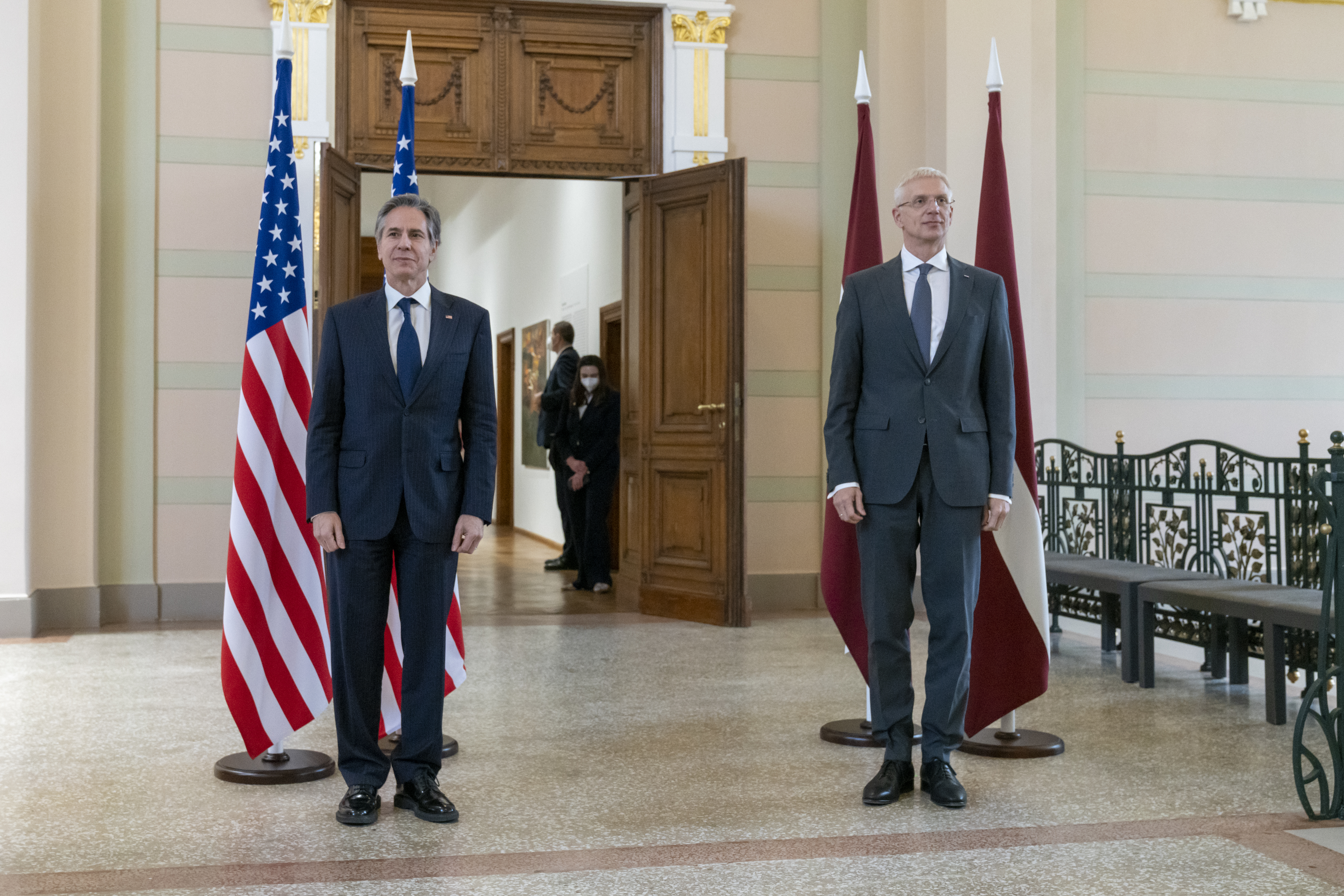
Kariņš with U.S. Secretary of State Antony Blinken in March 2022

Like his predecessors, Kariņš has stressed a commitment to a western-oriented foreign policy and has expressed caution regarding Russia's foreign policy intentions. On 7 January 2019, he announced that fellow party member Edgars Rinkēvičs, who had already at the time been Latvia's longest-serving foreign minister and had worked under prime ministers Valdis Dombrovskis, Laimdota Straujuma, and Māris Kučinskis, would continue in his current role. On 8 February, he made his first foreign visit to the neighboring country of Estonia, stressing the importance of relations between the two nations.

==== European Union ====
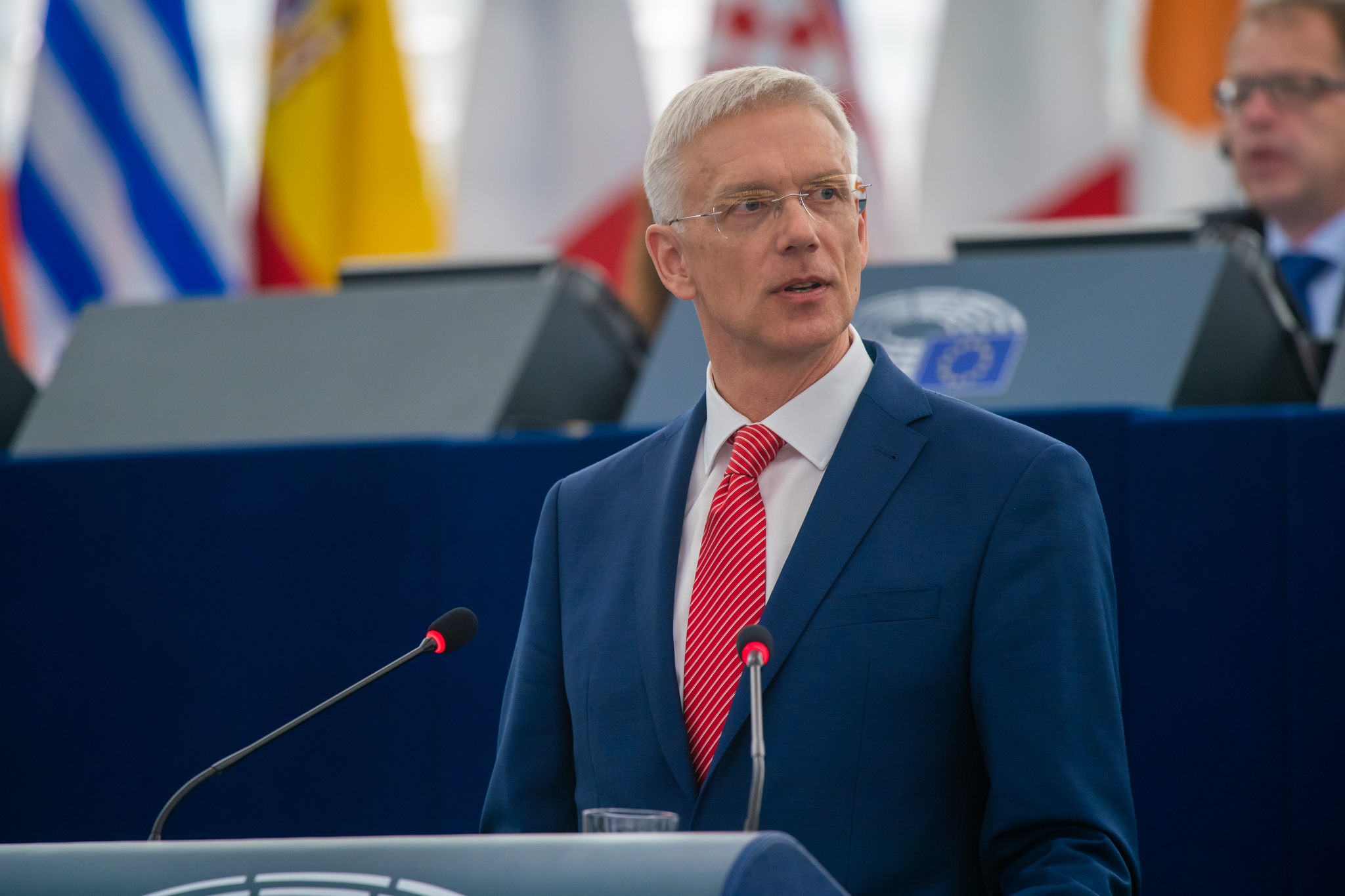
Kariņš speaking about the future of Europe at the European Parliament building in Strasbourg, France

On his first official visit to Brussels on 22 February 2019, Kariņš assured that Latvia would maintain a "Euro-Atlantic course," and that Brexit negotiator Michel Barnier had his full support. He addressed the European Parliament on 17 April, arguing that it was "useless" to just fight against the rise of populism, and that it was necessary in the first place to understand the grievances of people who listened to the promises of populists.

In a 9 May meeting with other EU leaders in Sibiu, Romania, he expressed support for the Spitzenkandidat process of electing a new European Commissioner used in 2014 that had come under fire by other leaders such as President Emmanuel Macron of France and President Dalia Grybauskaitė of Lithuania. Along with prime minister Andrej Plenković of Croatia, Kariņš represented the governments ruled by the center-right European People's Party (EPP) in the negotiations on new appointments to top posts in the European Union following the 2019 European elections, including the European Council, the European Commission and the European Central Bank.

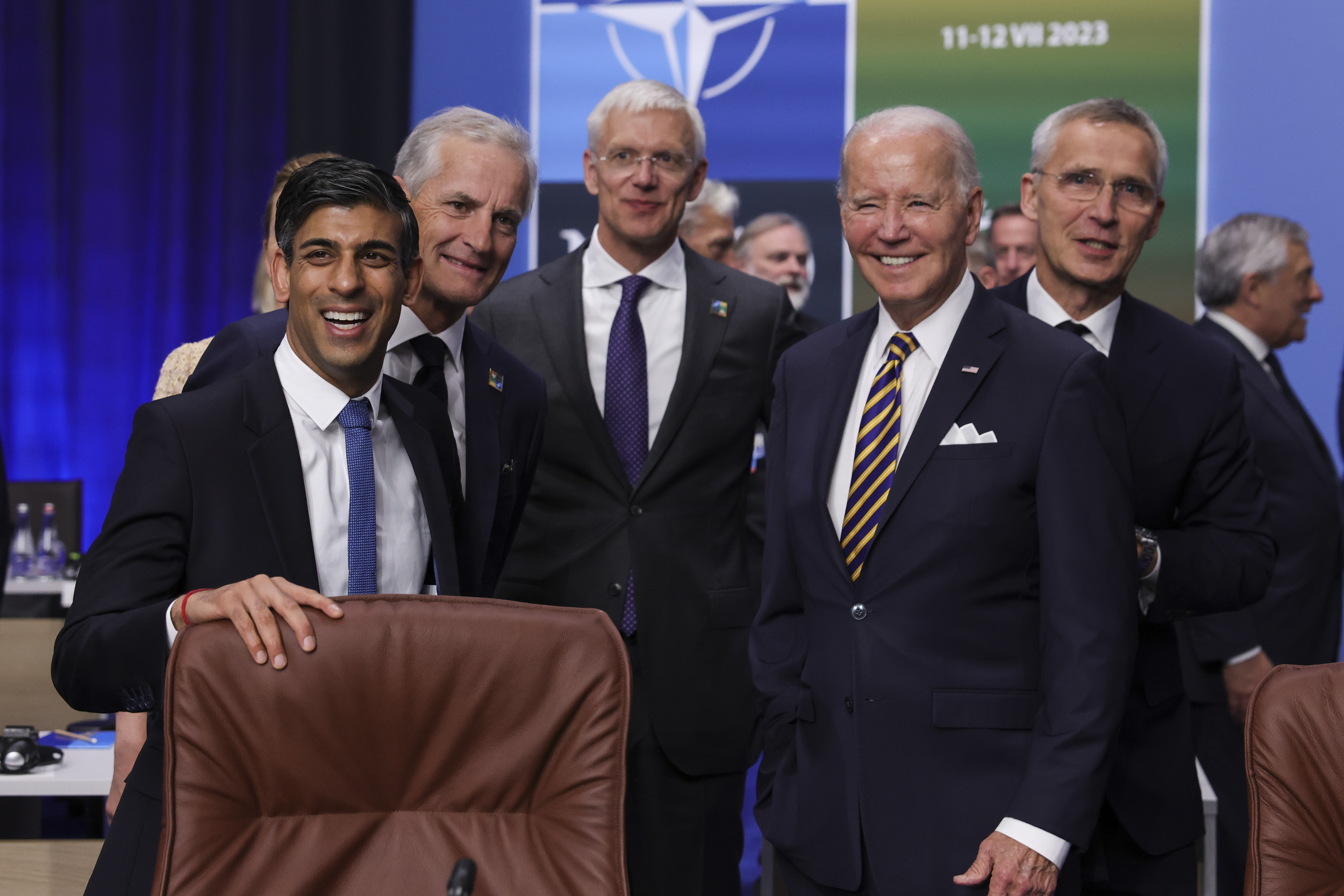
Kariņš with British Prime Minister Rishi Sunak, US President Joe Biden and NATO Secretary General Jens Stoltenberg at the 2023 Vilnius summit

==== Belarus ====
During Kariņš' tenure, relations with neighbouring country Belarus have become increasingly strained. In January 2021, Kariņš declared that he would not see it possible for Minsk to host the 2021 IIHF World Championship because of violent suppression of peaceful protests in Belarus. On 12 August 2021, a state of emergency was declared at the Belarus-Latvia border following a surge of immigration. On 23 August, Kariņš joined the prime ministers of Poland, Lithuania, and Estonia in releasing a statement that blamed Belarusian president Alexander Lukashenko for "using immigrants to destabilize neighbouring countries".

==== Russia ====
Throughout Kariņš' term as prime minister, relations between Latvia and Russia significantly worsened, particularly following the 2022 Russian invasion of Ukraine. At the Riga StratCom Dialogue in May 2022, Kariņš said that, "in order to ensure peace and security in Europe and the world, Russia must lose this war. Ukraine must win. This is the only way we can return to a peaceful life". At the same meeting, he also criticized certain western European leaders' perceived willingness to negotiate with Russia over the conflict. In a summit of Baltic sea countries in Copenhagen, Kariņš said that "countries surrounding the Baltic Sea should minimise economic cooperation with Russia, especially in the energy sector". On 25 August 2022, the Monument to the Liberators of Soviet Latvia and Riga from the German Fascist Invaders was removed. Kariņš said that along with decreasing energy dependence on Russia, this action "freed Latvia from the lasting consequences of occupation." On 8 September 2022, the Kariņš government approved additional restrictions on the entry of Russian citizens into Latvia via the external border of the European Union, with Kariņš saying that Russian citizens freely moving around the EU while Russia invaded Ukraine was "unacceptable both from a moral and security considerations".

==== Ukraine ====
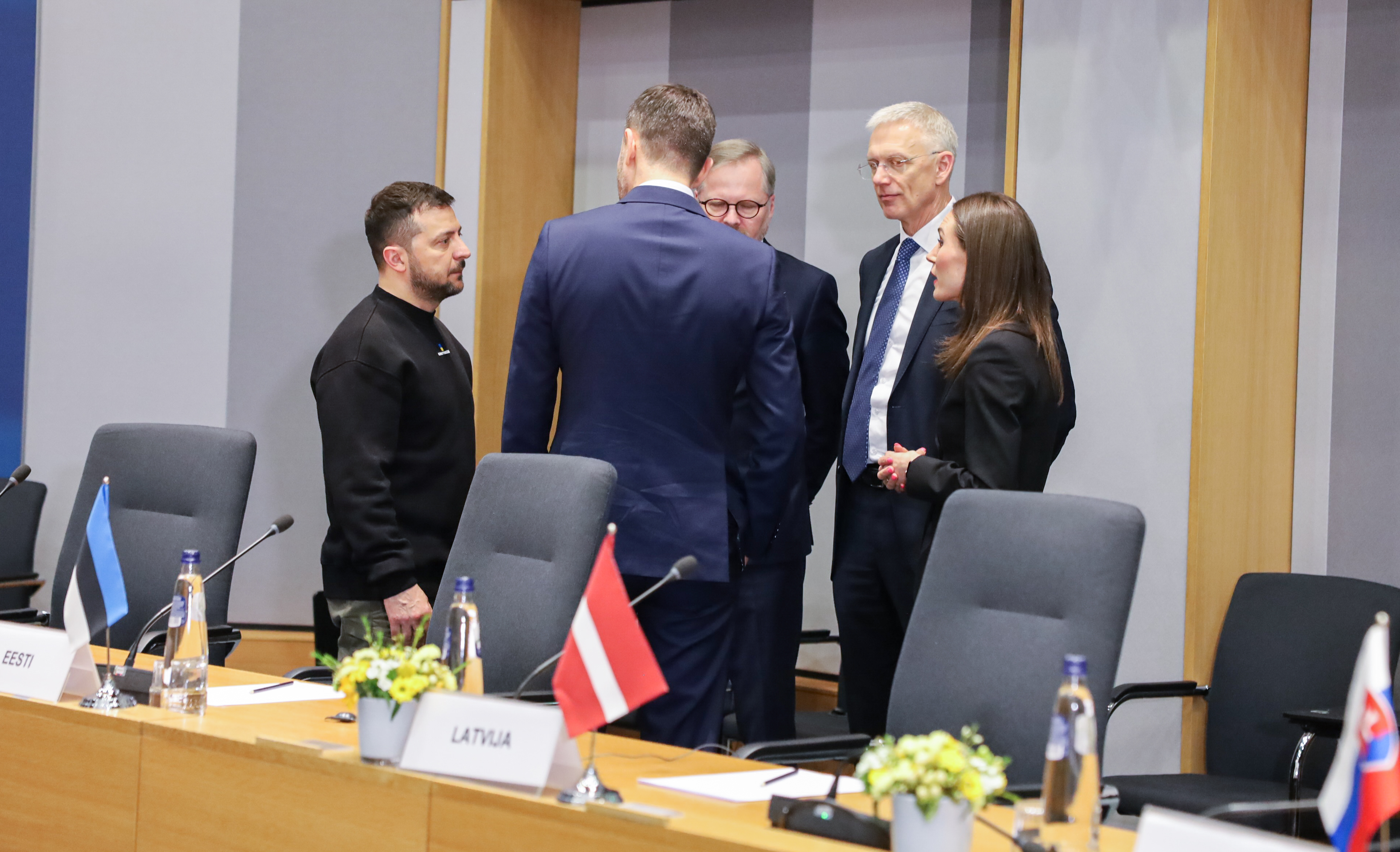
Kariņš with Ukrainian President Volodymyr Zelenskyy in February 2023

Under the Kariņš government, Latvia has supported Ukraine in its conflict with Russia. In January 2022, during the prelude to the Russian invasion of Ukraine, Latvia announced it would send FIM-92 Stinger air defense systems to Ukraine. The air defense systems were delivered in February 2022, shortly before the Russian invasion of Ukraine. On 23 February 2022, one day before Russia's invasion of Ukraine, Latvia delivered FIM-92 Stinger surface-to-air missiles to the Ukrainian Armed Forces. On 24 February, immediately following the invasion, Kariņš announced that Latvia was ready to take in 10,000 refugees. By August, over 36,000 Ukrainian refugees were registered in Latvia. Kariņš supported the June 2022 decision by the European Council to grant Ukraine and Moldova candidate status, saying that the decision would, "play an important role in implementing the necessary reforms in both new candidate countries". On 16 March 2023, he visited Kyiv to meet with President Zelenskyy.

=== COVID-19 pandemic ===
On 12 March 2020, Kariņš announced a state of emergency in response to the COVID-19 pandemic, declaring that schools would be closed as of the next day and begin distance learning, in addition to large gatherings being banned. After being extended in April, the state of emergency came to an end on 10 June. A second state of emergency was announced on 9 November 2020, which was extended on 1 December, 30 December and 5 February 2021, and came to an end on 7 April. In January 2021, Kariņš requested that Minister of Health Ilze Viņķele resign after criticizing her vaccination plan as inadequate. Daniels Pavļuts was confirmed as her replacement on 7 January.

A third state of emergency was proclaimed on 8 October 2021, which came into effect on 11 October. On October 20, the Kariņš government implemented a month-long "lockdown" in response to requests from the medical sector and Minister of Health Daniels Pavļuts. The same day, the government approved amendments that would allow employers to terminate contracts with employees who do not have a valid certificate of vaccination or recovery from COVID-19.

Initially, Kariņš was praised by international media for his government's handling of the early phases of the pandemic in Spring 2021. However, as the situation continued and new, more serious outbreaks occurred in Latvia throughout late 2020 and 2021, Kariņš's government became widely criticized for its management of the pandemic. On 11 October 2021, a group of experts that had been established by the Kariņš government earlier in the year ceased their cooperation with the government, with spokesman Klāvs Sedlenieks explaining that the group did not feel their work was resulting in informed decision making and that their recommendations were being used as part of the political process.

=== Resignation ===
He announced his resignation as prime minister on 14 August 2023 citing conflicts within the coalition led by his party. He was succeeded by Evika Siliņa on 15 September 2023.

== Foreign minister ==
Shortly after stepping down as prime minister, Kariņš joined Siliņa's government as foreign minister in September 2023. On 28 November, he announced his intention to seek the nomination to become the next Secretary General of NATO, saying that the alliance needed a consensus builder who is committed to higher defense spending and possessed a clear vision in managing relations with Russia.

On 28 March 2024, Kariņš announced that he was resigning as foreign minister effective 10 April following a decision by the Latvian prosecutor general’s office to initiate criminal proceedings over the alleged misuse of public funds in the utilization of private aviation services by Kariņš and his delegations during his prime ministership. In April, Baiba Braže was confirmed as Minister of Foreign Affairs in his place, while Kariņš returned to work in the Saeima. At the end of August, Kariņš announced the suspension of his mandate as a member of the Saeima.

=== Gaza war ===
In November 2023, Kariņš accused Hamas of using Palestinian civilians as human shields in the Gaza war in the Gaza Strip. Kariņš rejected calls for a ceasefire but said he supported "humanitarian pauses" to deliver aid to the people of Gaza.

== Personal life ==
Kariņš is married to general practitioner doctor Anda Kariņa, and has four children.

In March 2019, Saeima Deputy Aldis Gobzems asked law enforcement officials to investigate a Skolas iela 2 property transaction between Kariņš and wife Kariņa from one side and Russian citizens, who are associated with Gazprom International and the Government of Moscow from another, that he alleged could be related to money laundering and tax avoidance. On 18 May 2019, state police announced that they would not be initiating criminal proceedings after finding no signs of illegal wrongdoing.

Aside from his native Latvian and English, he speaks fluent German, French, and some Russian. During a visit to Minsk in January 2020, Kariņš stated in a meeting with President Alexander Lukashenko that it is easier for him to understand Russian than to speak, which leads him to speak to Russian-speakers through an interpreter "so as not to say something wrong".

Political offices
Preceded by Juris Lujāns	Minister for Economics; 2004–2006	Succeeded by Aigars Štokenbergs
Preceded by Māris Kučinskis	Prime Minister of Latvia; 2019–2023	Succeeded by Evika Siliņa
Preceded by Edgars Rinkēvičs	Minister of Foreign Affairs; 2023–2024	Succeeded by Baiba Braže
