= Vilnis Ķirsis =

Latvian politician and economist

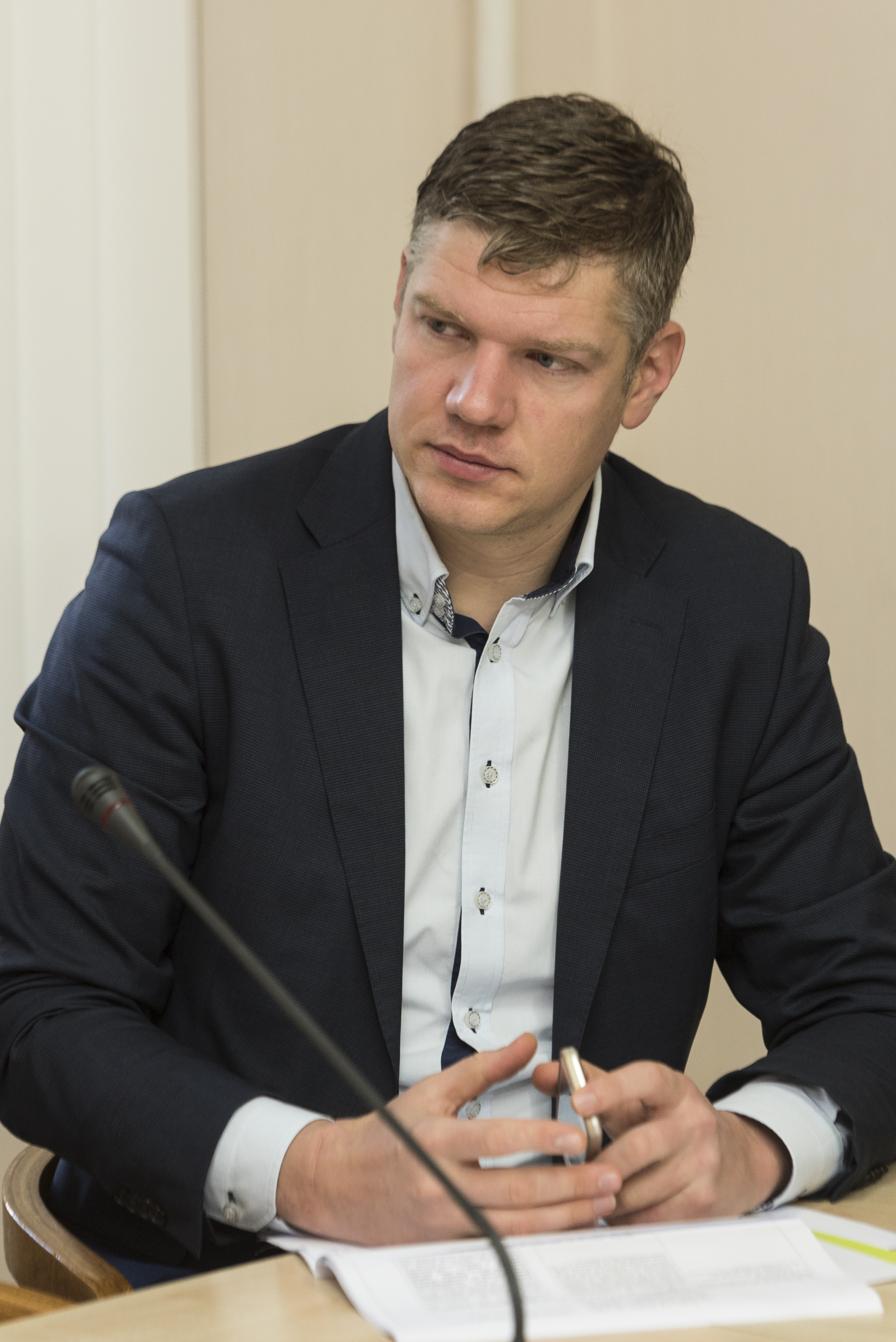
- Ķirsis in 2016

12th Mayor of Riga
- In office 17 August 2023 – 27 June 2025
- Preceded by: Mārtiņš Staķis
- Succeeded by: Viesturs Kleinbergs

Personal details
- Born: 20 August 1980 (age 45) Riga, Latvian SSR, Soviet Union
- Party: Unity
- Other political affiliations: Reform Party (2011-2014)

Vilnis Ķirsis (born 20 August 1980), is a Latvian politician, economist and businessman, who had served as one of the Deputy Mayors of the Riga City Council since 2025. Previously, he was the Mayor of Riga from 2023 to 2025.

He had been a member of the Riga City Council, and was also a member of the Saeima in two convocations. He represents the Unity party, and was previously a member of the Reform Party.

== Biography ==
Vilnis Ķirsis was born in Riga on 20 August 1980.

He was educated at Riga Hanza Secondary School, as well as at the Faculty of Economics and Management of the University of Latvia, where he obtained a master's degree in economics in 2004. He is a member of the Latvian student corporation Beveronija.

He was the chairman of the board of the company Fors Fortis, as well as a member of the board of the company Cannmeat.

He was a candidate from Zatlers' Reform Party in the 2011 snap Saeima elections, where was not elected to the parliament, but became the parliamentary secretary of the Ministry of Economics.

In 2013, he ran in the Riga City Council election with the second number on the list of the Reform Party, but the list did not clear the 5% electoral threshold, receiving around 2% of votes.

On 6 June 2013, Ķirsis received the mandate of the 11th Saeima deputy for the period while party member Vjačeslavs Dombrovskis was serving as Minister for Education and Science.

In May 2014, Ķirsis left the Reform Party and switched to the Unity party. From that list, with the help of a strong individual campaign, he was elected to the 12th Saeima in the Vidzeme constituency at the 2014 Saeima elections.

In the 2017 Riga City Council election, he ran as the leader of the Unity list and was elected to the municipality, where the faction operated in opposition. In 2019, he became an adviser to the Minister of Foreign Affairs, Edgars Rinkēvičs, on economic and energy policy issues.

In the 2020 snap Riga City Council elections, Ķirsis ran as the leader of the list of the Unity-dominated New Unity alliance, and was re-elected to the municipality. After the election, he was elected as one of the three deputies of the Chairman of the Riga City Council, Mārtiņš Staķis. On 2 October 2020, he was sworn in as deputy mayor (vice mayor/vice chairman) for urban development, planning and transport.

In July 2023, the ruling coalition of the Riga City Council collapsed, with one of the reasons being the possible illegality in the traffic construction projects, which was the Ķirsis' area of responsibility. After the resignation of the chairman of the Riga City Council (the Mayor of Riga), Mārtiņš Staķis, Ķirsis was approved as acting council chairman, as he was one of the deputy mayors (vice-chairmen). Staķis was elected mayor by the Riga City Council on 17 August 2023.

After the 2025 municipal election, a coalition was formed by The Progressives, which also included New Unity. The Progressives' Viesturs Kleinbergs was elected mayor, and Ķirsis once again became one of the deputy mayors.

== Family ==
He married doctor Elīna Zvaigzne-Ķirse during the COVID-19 pandemic.

They have a son together.

His father, Vilnis Ķirsis senior, was also a councilor of Riga City Council in the early 1990s, representing the LNNK party, and his mother was active in a political party. His brother, Valdemārs Dambekalns, is the co-founder of the "Valmiermuižas alus" brewery.
