= 2017 Riga City Council election =

- 3 June 2017

All 60 seats in the Riga City Council 31 seats needed for a majority
- Turnout: 250,107 (58.64%)
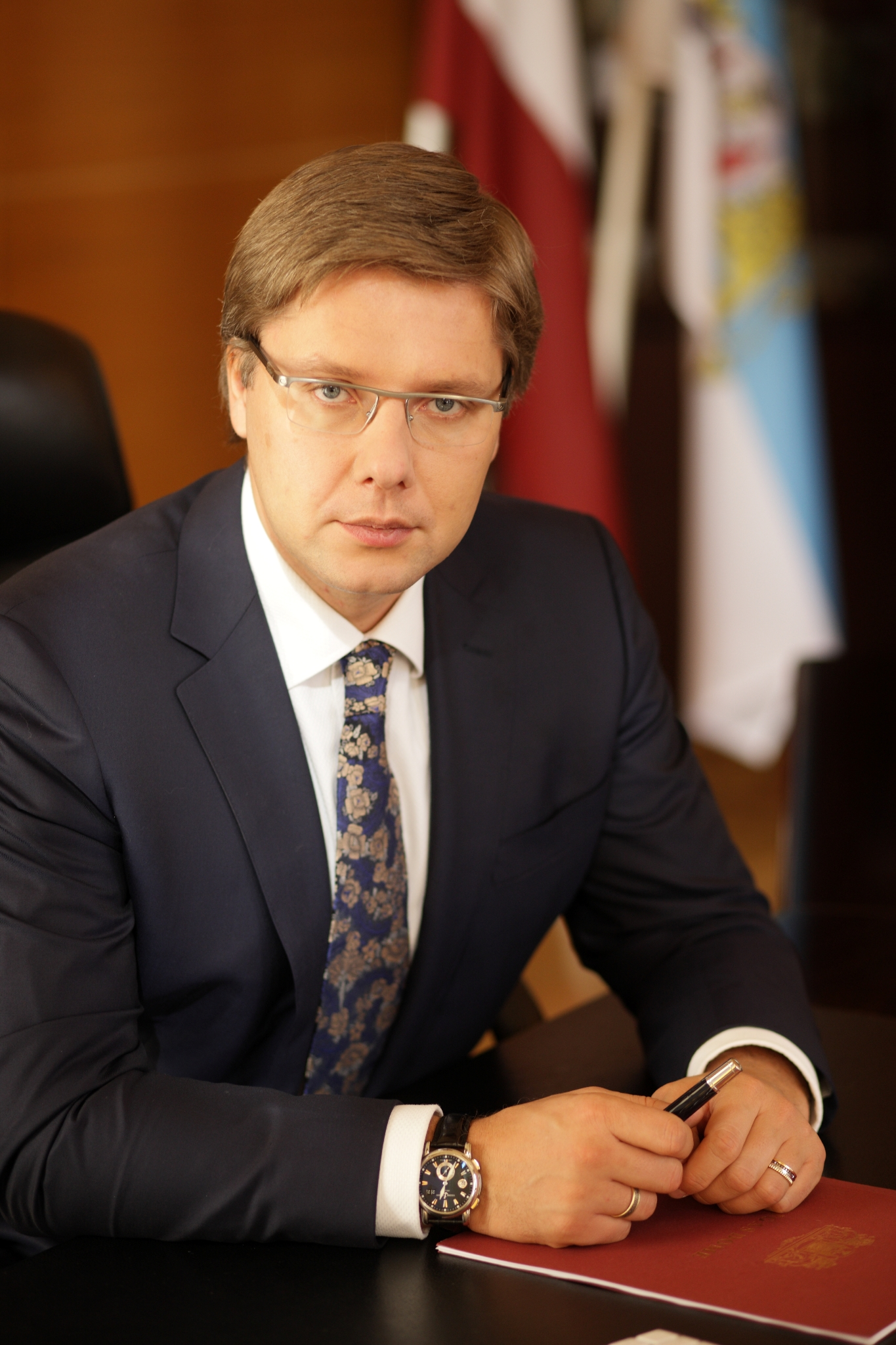
	First party
Leader	Nils Ušakovs
Party	Harmony / Honor to serve Riga
Leader since	27 November 2005
Last election	39 seats, 58.54%
Seats won	32
Seat change	▼7
Popular vote	127,099
Percentage	51.02%
Swing	▼7.52 pp
Mayor before election
Nils Ušakovs
Harmony
Elected mayor
Nils Ušakovs
Harmony

The 2017 Riga City Council election was held on June 3, 2017, to elect Riga City Council, the unicameral local legislature of the Riga, as part of municipal elections across the country. At stake were all 60 seats in the City Council.

After 2013 elections Harmony and Honor to Serve Riga won an absolute majority 39 of 60 seats and Nils Ušakovs was re-elected as mayor of Riga.

As a result of the election, Harmony and Honor to Serve Riga union received 32 of 60 seats and Nils Ušakovs was re-elected for the third term as mayor of Riga.

== Results ==
Party	Votes	%	Seats	+/–
Social Democratic Party "Harmony"–Honor to serve Riga	127,099	51.02	32	–7
Latvian Association of Regions–Latvian Development	34,176	13.72	9	+9
New Conservative Party	33,553	13.47	9	+9
National Alliance	23,135	9.29	6	–6
Unity	15,653	6.28	4	–5
Union of Greens and Farmers	8,249	3.31	0	0
Who Owns the State?	3,824	1.53	0	New
For Latvia From the Heart	1,517	0.61	0	New
All-Latvian Social Democratic Movement	799	0.32	0	New
Latvian Social Democratic Workers' Party	576	0.23	0	0
Eurosceptic Action Party	549	0.22	0	New
Total	249,130	100.00	60	0
Valid votes	249,130	99.61		
Invalid/blank votes	977	0.39		
Total votes	250,107	100.00		
Registered voters/turnout	426,505	58.64		
Source: Central Election Commission of Latvia
