= Viesturs Kleinbergs =

Latvian politician and social worker, Mayor of Riga since 2025

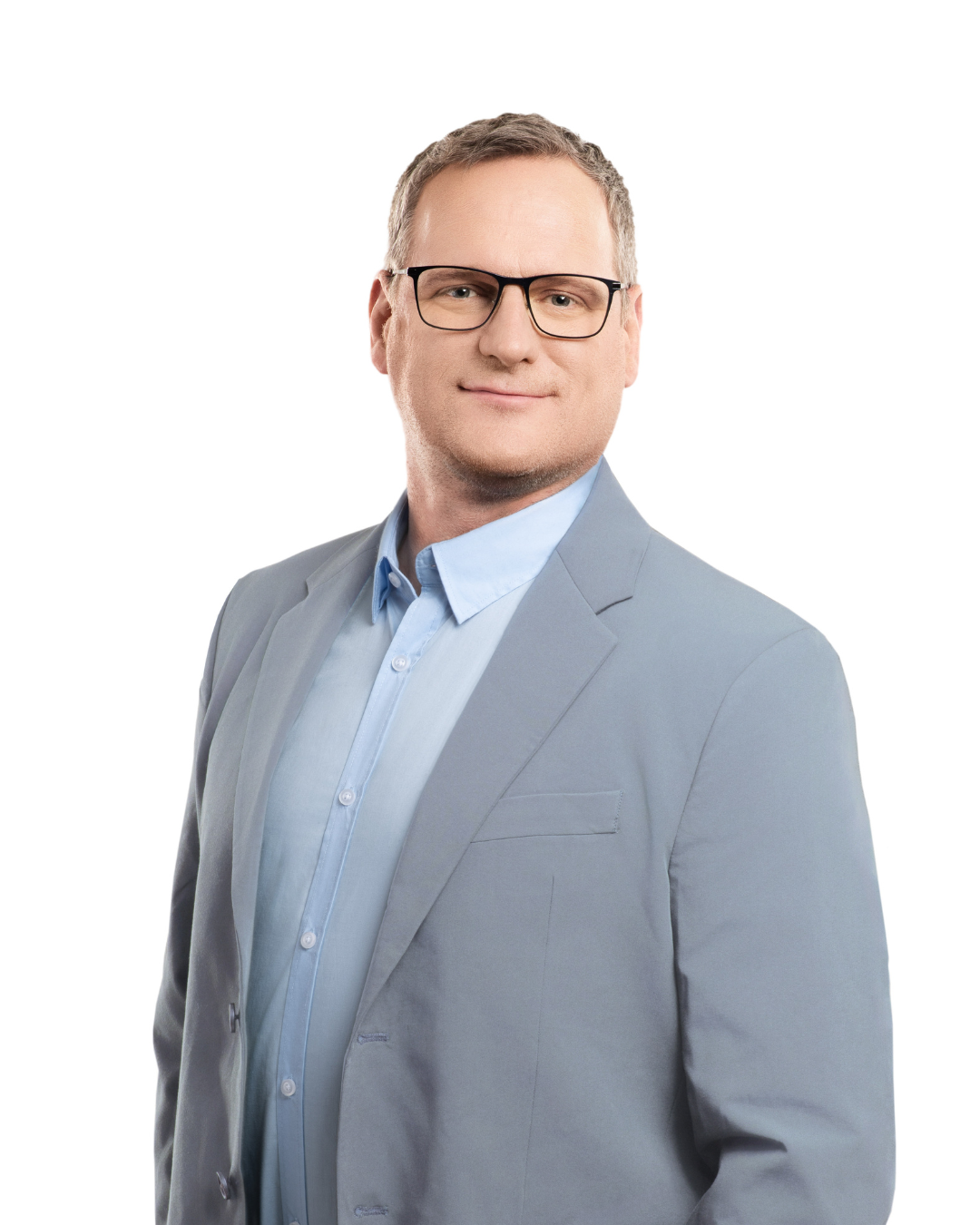

13th Mayor of Riga
- Incumbent
- Assumed office June 27, 2025
- President: Edgars Rinkēvičs
- Prime Minister: Evika Siliņa
- Preceded by: Vilnis Ķirsis

Councilor of the Riga City Council
- Incumbent
- Assumed office October 2, 2020

Personal details
- Born: March 14, 1978 (age 48) Riga, Latvian SSR, Soviet Union
- Party: The Progressives
- Education: University of Latvia (BA, MSW)
- Profession: Politician

Viesturs Kleinbergs (born March 14, 1978) is a Latvian politician and social worker currently serving as the chairman of the Riga City Council since 2025. He is a member of the Progressives party.

== Biography ==
Kleinbergs was born in Soviet-occupied Riga in 1978. He attended the University of Latvia and graduated in 2003 with a Bachelor's Degree of social science in political science. Since 2006, he has been a member of the Latvian Samaritan Union.

=== Political career ===
Kleinbergs first began working in the political field in 2006 as the head of the office and press secretary of Ainārs Baštiks, the then-Minister for Children, Family, and Social Integration with "Latvia´s First" political party. In 2010, he became an assistant to member of the Saeima Rita Strode from the same party, although it is unclear if he was a party member.

In 2012, Kleinbergs became a founding member of the GKR party, however, he soon quit when he began working in the Riga municipal government.

In 2020, he was elected to the Riga City Council as part of the common electoral list of the AP!/PRO political forces. In 2024 the Progressives party announced that Kleinbergs would be a candidate for the position of the Mayor of Riga during the 2025 Riga City Council election.

In 2025, he was re-elected to the city council after the Progressives won the second largest number of seats in the council (11, just behind Latvia First), and in June of that year he was elected as chairman of the council, leading a coalition of becoming the 13th Mayor of Riga since the restoration of the independence of Latvia and succeeding Vilnis Ķirsis.
