= Action Party (Latvia) =

Latvian political party

Action Party Rīcības partija
- Abbreviation: RP, ERP
- Leader: Ruslans Pankratovs
- Founder: Normunds Grostiņš
- Founded: 5 August 1998; 28 years ago (Be a Human); 26 March 2004; 22 years ago (Eurosceptics); 13 November 2008; 18 years ago (Action Party); 6 October 2016; 10 years ago (Eurosceptic Action Party); 9 February 2018; 8 years ago (Action Party)
- Dissolved: 27 October 2026
- Headquarters: Riga, Dzelzavas iela 19 k-3-17, LV-1084
- Ideology: Populism; Russophilia; Hard euroscepticism
- Political position: Since 2011: Right-wing; Until 2011: Far-left
- European affiliation: EUDemocrats (until 2011); European Alliance for Freedom (until 2016)
- Colours: Black; Blue
- Saeima: 0 / 100
- European Parliament: 0 / 8

Website
- ricibaspartija.lv

The Action Party (Latvian: Rīcības partija), in 2004-2008 and 2016-2018 Eurosceptic Action Party (Latvian: Eiroskeptiķu Rīcības partija) is a political organization in Latvia. It was founded under the name "Eurosceptics" before the 2003 referendum on Latvia's accession to the European Union, merging the party "Be a Human" (founded in 1998) and the public organization "Movement for Independence". The most prominent representatives of the organization were Normunds Grostiņš (former chairman of the board), artist Juris Dimiters, publicist Jānis Kučinskis and Viktors Dinēvičs. It was initially a left-wing party that later shifted rightwards.

Initially, the party has cooperated with the populist political association "Dzimtene" and the far-left Socialist Party of Latvia. It was also a part of the left-wing Eurosceptic European political party EUDemocrats. In 2011, the party moved to the right and had been operating in the right-wing euro-critical party "European Alliance for Freedom" together with the Austrian Freedom Party and the French National Front, until 2016 when the organization was disbanded. The party moved in a pro-Russian direction after 2016, working together with the centre-left National Harmony Party as well as the Latvian Russian Union.

== History ==
The party was founded in 1998 as a merger of the "Be a Human" organization as well as the public movement "Movement for Independence". Its name before 2003 was "Eurosceptics".

In the 2004 European elections, the party won 0.95% of the vote. In the 2005 Riga City Council elections, "Eurosceptics", remaining organisationally independent, participated in the joint list of "Dzimtene" and LSP, without obtaining any mandate. The consolidated list won 11.5% of the vote. In the Saeima elections of 2006, the party received 0.37% of the vote.

In 2008, the party was renamed the Action Party. In the 2009 European Parliament election in Latvia, the party won 0.43% of the vote (3,415 valid ballot papers), but in the 2013 Riga City Council elections - 0.24% of the vote.

The party last participated in the 2017 municipal elections under the name "Eurosceptic Action Party" with little success and in the 2020 Riga City Council snap election again as the Action Party, receiving 0.18% of the vote.

The leader of the party, Ruslans Pankratovs, was detained by the State Security Service of Latvia in August 2022 on suspicion of public support for the Russian invasion of Ukraine and evasion of sanctions placed on Russia. He was also spotted while attending a conference that took place in the Russian-occupied areas of Zaporizhzhia Oblast in July 2022.

In the 2019 European Parliament election in Latvia, the party ran on a pro-Russian message, with the slogan “We shall force Europe to recognize Crimea as ours!” in Russian. However, the party finished last, winning 0.17% of the popular vote. On its electoral list, it included the members of the centre-left National Harmony Party such as Igor Melnikov and Ruslan Pankratov, as well as the Latvian Russian Union - Einārs Graudiņš and Oleg Nikiforov.

== Ideology ==
Between 1998 and 2011, the Action Party was radically left-wing, being a member of the left-wing Eurosceptic EUDemocrats and closely cooperating with the Socialist Party of Latvia, itself a post-communist party that continues the legacy of the Communist Party of Latvia. In 2011, the party left EUDemocrats and shifted to the right, becoming a mamber of the right-wing European Alliance for Freedom.

The party is against the existence of the European Union, and supports strict immigration control, opposing exceptions for asylum seekers and refugees. The party also argues that the Western culture is alien to Latvia and that Latvian society must be protected from its hypocritical and "perverse" nature, as well as to preserve the Latvian culture.

Since 2011, the party has also become strongly anti-immigration. Einārs Graudiņš, the party's head of the electoral list for the 2019 European Parliament election in Latvia, said: “The question that has not been addressed yet is of the illegal immigration. This question should be addressed immediately and should be addressed surgically; all of those black masses that wander right now uncontrollably around Europe should be put to boats, sent to Malta, Sicily, and then back to where they came from. To all the others who swim into our united country [Europe], we immediately open fire.”

The party likewise has taken strongly anti-Islamic positions, warning against the looming "Islamization of Latvia and Europe". The Action Party also protested the "Baltic Pride LGBT" movement which organizes pride marches in the Baltic States. The party is also against ratifying the Istanbul Convention on Preventing and Combating Violence against Women and Domestic Violence.

Other policies of the party include lowering the excise tax on motor fuel, tobacco and alcoholic beverages.

The party also targets the Russian minority in Latvia, and supports the 2022 Russian invasion of Ukraine. In the 2019 European Parliament election in Latvia, its campaign slogan was “We shall force Europe to recognize Crimea as ours!” written in Russian.
