= 2020 Riga City Council election =

Snap municipal election in Riga, Latvia

- 26–29 August 2020
Party	Leader	Vote %	Seats	+/–
AP/P	Mārtiņš Staķis	26.14%	18	New
Harmony	Konstantīns Čekušins	16.91%	12	−9
Unity	Vilnis Ķirsis	15.24%	10	+6
NA/LRA	Einārs Cilinskis	9.64%	7	0
GKR	Oļegs Burovs	7.71%	5	−6
LKS	Miroslavs Mitrofanovs	6.52%	4	New
JKP	Linda Ozola	6.39%	4	−5
This lists parties that won seats. See the complete results below.
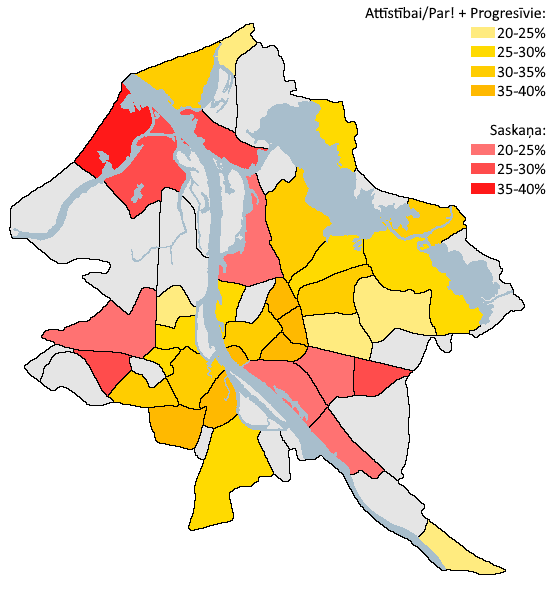
Mayor of Riga before	Mayor of Riga after
Office suspended	Mārtiņš Staķis; Development/For!

The 2020 Riga City Council election was held from 26 to 29 August 2020 to elect the 60 members of Riga City Council. The election was initially scheduled for 25 April 2020, and then rescheduled three times – once due to a court ruling and twice due to the COVID-19 pandemic in Latvia, to 2 May, 6 June, and 29 August. The council was elected for nearly five years instead of the standard four, and the following election took place in 2025, at the same time as other municipal elections in Latvia.

== Background ==
In the 2017 Riga City Council election, the political alliance of Harmony (SKDS) and Honor to serve Riga (GKR) lost 7 seats but held on to their absolute majority with 32 seats out of 60. Nils Ušakovs was re-elected as the mayor of Riga, and served until 4 April 2019, when the Latvian minister for Environmental Protection and Regional Development Juris Pūce fired him. On 31 May Dainis Turlais from GKR was elected as the new mayor of Riga, but was ousted by a vote of no-confidence on 20 June, after just 21 days in the position. On 19 August Oļegs Burovs from GKR was elected as the new mayor of Riga, and served until 24 February 2020, when the City Council was officially dissolved.

== Opinion polls ==
Graphical summary

Fieldwork date	Polling firm/Commissioner	Sample size	SDPS	GKR	NA/LRA		AP!/P		V/JV	JKP	ZZS	LKS	KPV LV	Alt	PNL/JS	Other	Lead
Fieldwork date	Polling firm/Commissioner	Sample size	SDPS	GKR	NA	LRA	LA/AP!	PRO	V/JV	JKP	ZZS	LKS	KPV LV	Alt	PNL/JS	Other	Lead
(published on 26 August 2020)	SKDS/LTV	1366	22.7	8.3	10.5		22.3		10.8	6.1	4.9	6.5	2.2	3.1	1.9	0.8	0.4
3-23 August 2020	Factum		15.4	8.1	10.5		23.6		13.9	8.3	5.7	8.4	1.2	(1-2%)	(1-2%)	4.9	8.2
?-21 August 2020	Berg Research	500	21.1	9	10.8		18.3		12.9	5.4	6.9	6.9	2.4	3.6		2.7	2,8
27 July-16 August	Factum	739	15.6	9.3	9.7		22.9		13.6	8.2	6.2	7.8	1.3	(1-2%)	(1-2%)	5.4	7.3
20 July-9 August 2020	Factum	829	16.3	9.7	9.3		22.8		12.4	9	6.5	6.8	1.4	(1-2%)	(1-2%)	5.8	6.5
13 July-1 August 2020	Factum	873	16.6	10.1	9.1		23.2		11.1	9.2	7.4	6.1	1.3	(1-2%)	(1-2%)	4.9	6.6
24-28 July 2020	SKDS/LTV	1008	21,5	8,5	11,7		22,6		9	6,8	5,3	5,5	2,2	0,7	5,2	1,0	1,1
22 June-12 July	Factum	412	18,3	8,5	10,5		23,7		10,9	9,8	6,1	6,4	1,6			4,2	5,4
2-6 July 2020	SKDS/LTV	556	33,2	5,9	8,6		23,3		8,4	5,7	6,1	5	1,9	1,5		0,4	9,9
25 May-14 June 2020	Factum	716	19,9	11,5	10,5		21,6		13	7,9	3,6	6,3	0,6			5,1	1,7
18-31 May 2020	Factum	636	21,7	10,7	10,2		20		13	8,5	4,5	5,7	0,6			5,1	1,7
May 2020	SKDS/LTV		36	5,9	10,1		16,6		8,1	9,7	3,2	6,6	2,3	1,1		0,4	19,4
7–26 April 2020	Factum	705	23,2	10	8,7		21,1		12	8,9	4,3	6,8	1			5	2,1
4–27 March 2020	Factum	1087	24,2	9,2	9,2		20,5		11,3	9,2	5,3	7	1,1			3	3,7
24–28 February 2020	Factum	377	26,6	6,9	8,3		20,8		12	9,5	5,2	6,1	1,7			2,9	5,8
18–21 February 2020	SKDS/LTV	364	29	8	12,8	1,3	16,3		11,6	10,8	4,2	3,8		0,7		1,5	12,7
28 January-1 February 2020	Factum	362	28,3	7,6	8,3	1,7	13,4	6,4	13,9	9,9	2,7	5,1	0,9			1,6	14,4
18-31 December 2019	Factum	511	26,4	5,3	9,3	2,4	12,6	5,4	15,4	10	1,8	7,7	1,2			2,5	11
21-24 November 2019	Factum		24,3	6,8	9	1,8	16,6	6	16,2	8,8	2	6,6				1,9	7,3
October 2019	Factum		25,3	6,2	8,4	1,7	17,2	5,7	15,4	9,6	1,6	7,2				2,7	7,8
September 2019	Factum		24,5	7,2	8,6	1,8	16,5	5,3	15,2	9,5	1,6	8,1				1,7	8
August 2019	Factum		24,9	5,7	8,7	1,0	17,6	4	13,5	12,6	1,7	8,9				1,4	7,3
22-29 July 2019	Factum	205	25,1	6,9	9,2	0,8	17,4		12,5	13	1,7	9				4,2	7,7
2017 Riga City Council election			50,8		9,3	13,7		-	6,3	13,4	3,3	-	1,5	-	0,32	1,3	37,1

Graphical summary of candidate net approval ratings

== Results ==
The coalition of the centrist Development/For! alliance and centre-left The Progressives (both new entities which did not participate in the prior elections) obtained a plurality of votes and seats. The election resulted in both parties of the governing coalition (Social Democratic Party "Harmony" and Honor to serve Riga) lose seats, and saw their combined vote share decline by nearly half. The Latvian Russian Union returned to the city council for the first time since 2009, obtaining four seats, while the New Conservative Party saw their seat count drop by five. The Union of Greens and Farmers fell less than 1% short of the 5% threshold needed to enter the council.

As no party held a majority, a coalition was needed, with 31 seats needed for a majority coalition.

Party	Votes	%	Seats	+/–
Development/For! - The Progressives	44,619	26.33	18	New
Social Democratic Party "Harmony"	28,811	17.00	12	–9
New Unity	25,986	15.33	10	+6
National Alliance - Latvian Association of Regions	16,435	9.70	7	0
Honor to serve Riga	13,162	7.77	5	–6
Latvian Russian Union	11,112	6.56	4	New
New Conservative Party	10,903	6.43	4	–5
Union of Greens and Farmers	6,936	4.09	0	0
Alternative	5,163	3.05	0	New
New Harmony	2,892	1.71	0	New
Who owns the state?	1,912	1.13	0	0
United for Latvia	583	0.34	0	New
National Alliance "Justice"	392	0.23	0	New
Action Party	301	0.18	0	0
Latvian Centrist Party	262	0.15	0	New
Total	169,469	100.00	60	0
Valid votes	169,469	98.81		
Invalid/blank votes	2,038	1.19		
Total votes	171,507	100.00		
Registered voters/turnout	422,681	40.58		
Source: CVK
