= Mārtiņš Staķis =

Latvian entrepreneur and politician

Mārtiņš Staķis MEP
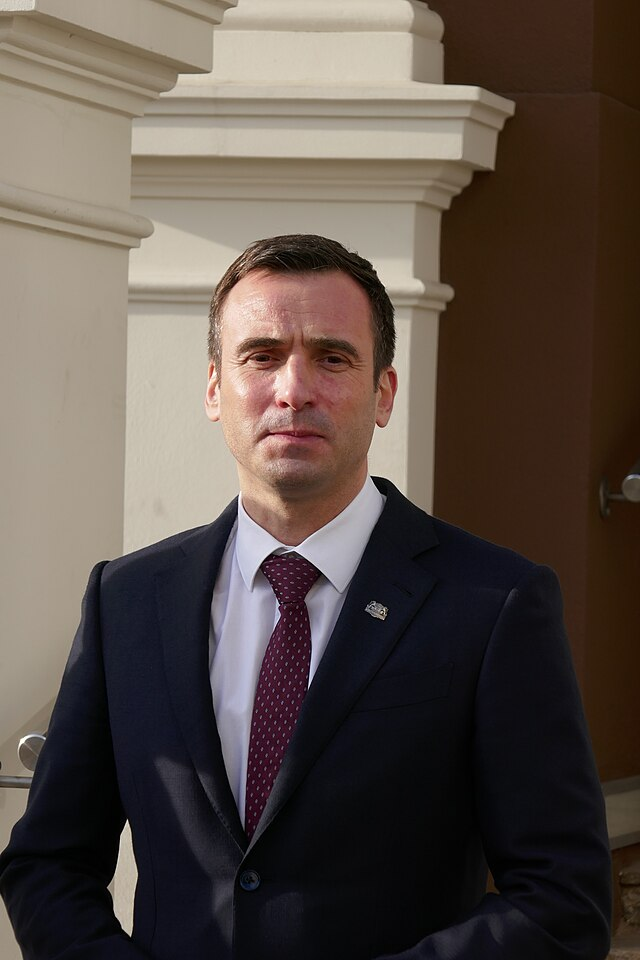

11th Mayor of Riga
- In office 2 October 2020 – 5 July 2023
- President: Egils Levits
- Prime Minister: Krišjānis Kariņš
- Preceded by: Oļegs Burovs (Interim administration since February 2020)
- Succeeded by: Vilnis Ķirsis

Member of the European Parliament
- Incumbent
- Assumed office 16 July 2024
- Constituency: Latvia

Parliamentary Secretary to the Minister of Defence
- In office 1 February 2019 – 21 August 2020
- Preceded by: Viesturs Silenieks
- Succeeded by: Baiba Bļodniece

Deputy to the Saeima
- In office 6 November 2018 – 5 June 2020

Personal details
- Born: 4 July 1979 (age 47) Tukums, Latvian SSR, USSR (now Latvia)
- Party: Movement For! (2017–2022); The Progressives (2024–)
- Other political affiliations: Development/For!
- Parent: Dagnija Staķe (mother)
- Education: University of Latvia; Helsinki School of Economics
- Occupation: Businessman, politician

Mārtiņš Staķis (born 4 July 1979) is a Latvian politician and businessman, Mayor of Riga from 2020 to 2023. He served as a deputy of the 13th Saeima, the Latvian parliament, until he resigned on 5 June 2020. On 29 August 2020, Staķis was elected to the Riga City Council, and on 2 October, elected Mayor of Riga.

== Biography ==
Staķis is the son of Dagnija Staķe, the former Minister of Regional Development and Local Governments of Latvia. He was born in Tukums.

He graduated from the Tukums Rainis Gymnasium in 2004 and obtained a bachelor's degree from the University of Latvia, specializing in municipal organization. He also studied at the Helsinki School of Economics in Finland.

Staķis started his working life in a Narvesen kiosk and for more than a decade, from 1999 to 2010, worked as a marketing director. Since 2010, he has been a businessman, distributor of the coffee brand illy and owner of Innocent Cafe in Riga.

He gained public recognition for hosting the TV show Saknes debesīs on LTV1. He has also been active in the Latvian National Guard as well as working as a volunteer for the youth educational organization MOT.

Staķis is one of the founders and members of the choir Pa Saulei as well as a board member of the St. Gertrude Old Church in Riga. He is one of the authors behind the Ū vitamīns initiative, aiming to provide free drinking water in cafes, restaurants and other public places.

== Political work ==
In August 2017, Staķis helped found Movement For!, and was elected to the board of the party. Since its founding, Staķis has been active in the party, both as executive director and leader of its pre-election campaign.

Staķis was elected in the Riga Constituency in the 2018 Latvian parliamentary elections, representing the Development/For! alliance, formed between his own Movement For! and the classical liberal For Latvia's Development. Before the election, Staķis was discussed as a possible candidate for the office of Minister of Defence.

Before the 2020 Riga City Council elections, Staķis gave up his seat in the Saeima on 5 June 2020, and party colleague Krista Baumane took over his seat.

On 29 August 2020, elections were held, with the alliance between Development/For! and The Progressives winning 18 seats, the most of any electoral list. On 2 October 2020 Staķis was elected Mayor, leading a broad coalition consisting of Development/For!, The Progressives, New Unity, the National Alliance, the Latvian Association of Regions and the New Conservative Party.

On 24 March 2022, Staķis announced that he was leaving Development/For! after disagreements in the alliance about the Riga City development plan. Staķis accused the Minister for Environmental Protection and Regional Development Artūrs Toms Plešs of lobbying to the casino industry, which led him vetoing the law.

On 3 July 2023, Mārtiņš Staķis resigned as chairman of the Riga City Council, citing a split the ruling coalition. Staķis said he could no longer take responsibility for the City Council's decisions, especially after his coalition partners voted with the opposition. This came after Staķis supported an investigation into possible misuse of city funds in the Traffic Department.

On 9 January 2024, Staķis joined the Progressives party, having previously worked together with them in his coalition administration and from its list will be candidates in the 2024 European Parliament elections.

Preceded by Office temporarily dissolved (Interim administration" Oļegs Burovs)	Mayor of Riga; 2020–2023	Succeeded by Vilnis Ķirsis
