= Aivars Aksenoks =

Latvian politician

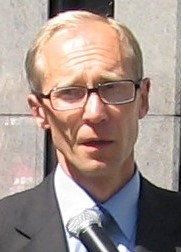

6th Mayor of Riga
- In office 29 March 2005 – 19 February 2007
- Prime Minister: Aigars Kalvītis
- Preceded by: Gundars Bojārs
- Succeeded by: Jānis Birks

Personal details
- Born: 24 May 1961 (age 65) Riga, Latvian SSR
- Party: CPSU; New Era; National Alliance
- Education: Riga Technical University

Aivars Aksenoks (born 24 May 1961) is a Latvian politician. A founder of the right-wing New Era, Aksenoks has a degree in engineering from the Riga Technical University and was the director of State Road and Traffic Safety Agency from 1992 to 2002. He was also the Minister of Justice, serving from 2003 to 2004. However, he is best known for being the mayor of Riga from 29 March 2005 to 19 February 2007.

He moved from JL to For Fatherland and Freedom/LNNK in 2008. Since 2009, Aksenoks is director of the Riga Motor Museum.

Preceded by Gundars Bojārs	Mayor of Riga; 2005–2007	Succeeded by Jānis Birks
