= Alfrēds Andersons =

Latvian translator and politician

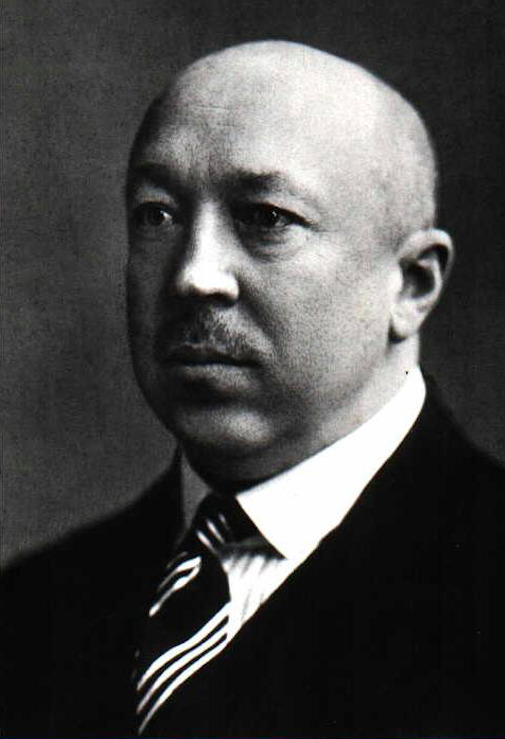
Alfrēds Andersons in 1922

Alfrēds Andersons (pen name Andrass; 7 April 1879, in Dunte Manor, Kreis Wolmar – 1 February 1937, in Riga, Latvia) was a Latvian civil engineer, litterateur, pedagogue, educational worker and the Mayor of Riga from 1921 to 1928.

Even though Andersons graduated from the Riga Polytechnicum, his life mostly followed the path of education. From 1907 he taught in mathematics and physics at the schools of Vilis Olavs and Atis Ķēniņs. During World War I Andersons managed factories in Riga that supplied the war effort. Following Latvian independence he became director of the 4. Riga Secondary School, and 1920 he was promoted to head of the educational department of the Riga City Council. Andersons was elected Mayor of Riga from 1921 to 1928 as a member of the Democrats Union, and after that he worked as a school director.

In 1916 Andersons wrote the play Ķēniņš Dāvids (King David), which premiered 28 February 1923 at the Latvian National Theatre. Another of his plays, Baltezeru dzimtas asinis (Baltezers' Family Blood), premiered 29 November 1933, also at the national theatre. He also translated the libretto of Richard Wagner's opera Tannhäuser to Latvian.

Andersons died on 1 February 1937 in Riga, at the age of 58.
