= Andris Ārgalis =

Latvian politician (born 1944)

4th Mayor of Riga
- In office 10 May 2000 – 27 March 2001
- Prime Minister: Andris Bērziņš
- Preceded by: Andris Bērziņš
- Succeeded by: Gundars Bojārs

Personal details
- Born: 18 August 1944 (age 82) Ipiķi parish, Generalbezirk Lettland (Now Valmiera Municipality, Latvia)
- Party: For Fatherland and Freedom/LNNK, People's Party
- Education: Latvian University of Agriculture

Andris Ārgalis (born 18 August 1944) is a Latvian politician. He was the mayor of Riga from 2000 to 2001.

Andris Ārgalis graduated from the Latvian Academy of Agriculture in 1969.

In 1997 he was elected to the Riga City Council as representative of the For Fatherland and Freedom/LNNK, a Latvian nationalist party. In 2000 and 2001 he was the Riga City Council Chairman (mayor). In a poll conducted in December 2000, he was the third most popular politician in Latvia with a rating 35.4 points on a scale from -100 to +100, after President Vaira Vīķe-Freiberga with 54.6 points and Bank of Latvia President Einars Repše with 52.5 points.

In 2002 he left the City Council Members' office, and was elected a member of Parliament. In 2005 he resigned from Parliament and was re-elected to the Riga City Council, became a deputy mayor and chairman of the board of the Free port of Riga, a post traditionally held by the mayor.

Preceded by Andris Bērziņš	Mayor of Riga; 2000—2001	Succeeded by Gundars Bojārs
