= Andris Ameriks =

Latvian politician and economist (born 1961)

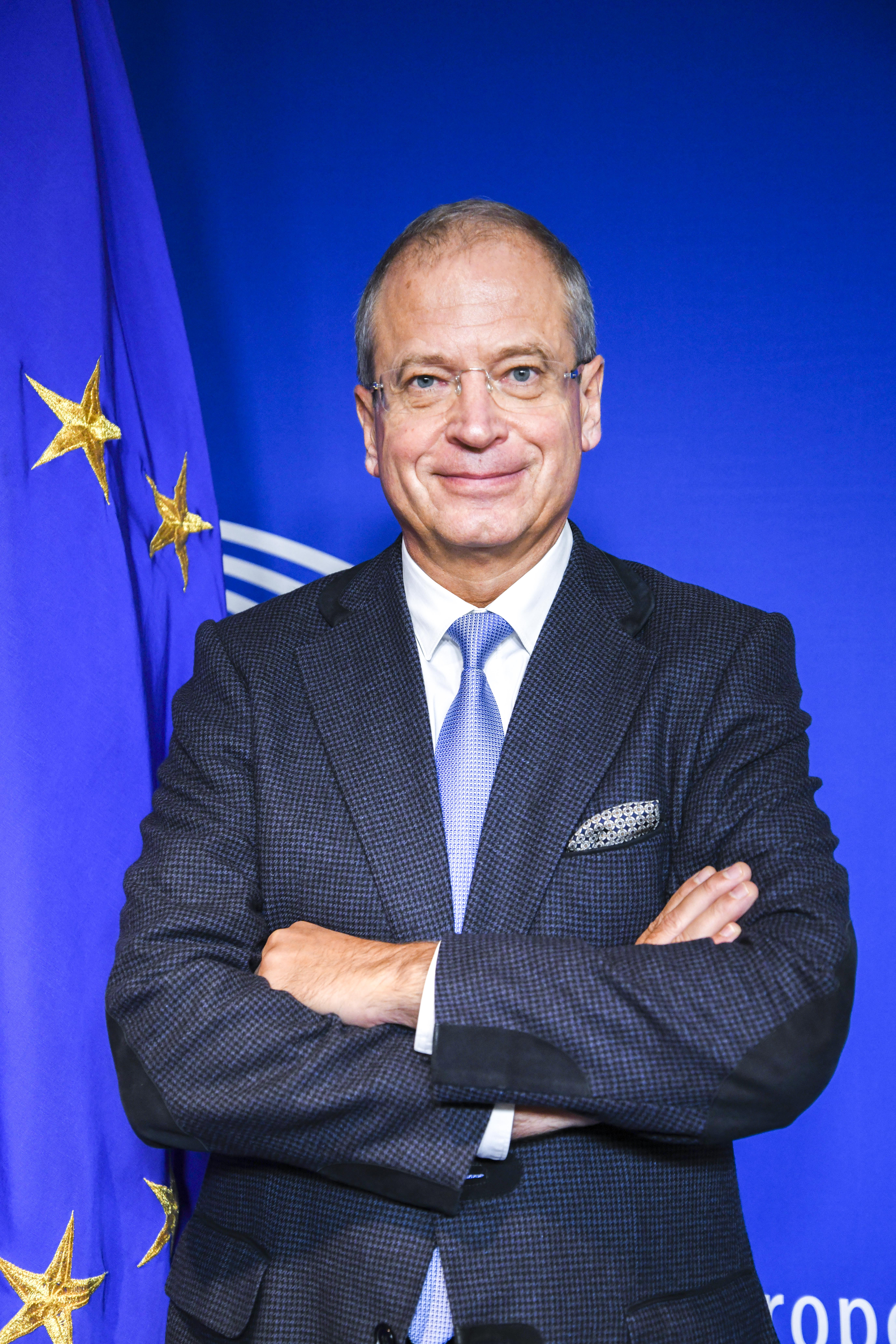

Member of the European Parliament
- In office 2019–2024

Deputy Mayor of Riga
- In office 9 November 2010 – 17 December 2018
- Preceded by: Ainārs Šlesers
- Succeeded by: Oļegs Burovs

Member of the Speaker of the Saeima
- In office 7 November 1995 – 1 November 1998

Personal details
- Born: 5 March 1961 (age 65) Jūrmala, Latvia, Soviet Union
- Party: Honor to serve Riga (2012–2024)
- Spouse: Ginta Amerika

Andris Ameriks (born March 5, 1961, in Jūrmala, Latvian SSR) is a Latvian politician and economist who has been serving as a Member of the European Parliament since the 2019 elections. He is a former deputy mayor of Riga.

== Political career ==
=== Career in national politics ===
During his youth, he was a former first secretary of the Communist Youth organization of the Latvian SSR. From 1993 to 1998 he was a member of the Saeima, representing the National Harmony Party and later, Democratic Party "Saimnieks". From 2001 he has been a member of the Riga City Council, from 2010 till 2018 serving as the Deputy Chairman of Riga City Council, i.e. the deputy mayor of the Latvian capital.

Ameriks is known to be getting a significant part of his income from investments in payday loan companies. In 2017 Ameriks received the largest income among the elected municipal officials in Latvia, reporting an income of 616,386 EUR and 35,250 USD, with most of it being interest payments from Mogo non-bank lender and from the sale of securities.

Ameriks resigned as deputy mayor of Riga City Council on December 17, 2018, amid corruption allegations around Rīgas Satiksme. On December 19, 2018, members from the Riga City Council opposition initiated an unsuccessful vote of no confidence against Ameriks as a board chairman for Freeport of Riga.

=== Member of the European Parliament ===
Ameriks has been a Member of the European Parliament since the 2019 elections. He has since been serving on the Committee on Transport and Tourism and the Committee on Petitions.

In addition to his committee assignments, Ameriks is part of the Parliament’s delegation to the EU-Kazakhstan, EU-Kyrgyzstan, EU-Uzbekistan and EU-Tajikistan Parliamentary Cooperation Committees and for relations with Turkmenistan and Mongolia. He is also a member of the European Parliament Intergroup on Western Sahara.
