= Dainis Turlais =

Latvian politician (born 1950)

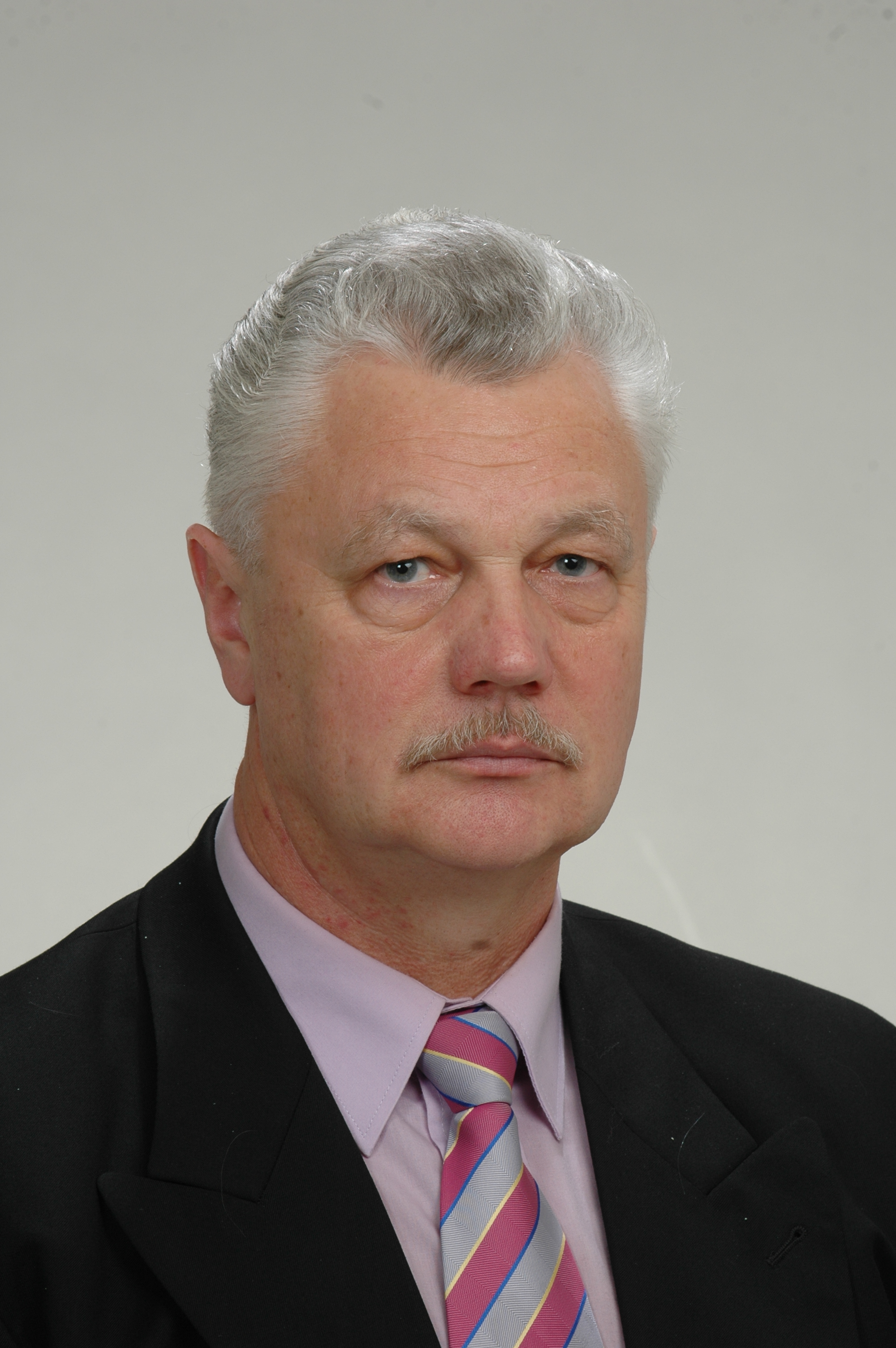

9th Mayor of Riga
- In office 30 May 2019 – 20 June 2019
- Deputy: Oļegs Burovs
- Preceded by: Nils Ušakovs
- Succeeded by: Oļegs Burovs

Minister of the Interior of Latvia
- In office 21 December 1995 – 10 July 1997
- Prime Minister: Andris Šķēle
- Preceded by: Jānis Ādamsons
- Succeeded by: Ziedonis Čevers

Personal details
- Born: 24 November 1950 (age 75) Madona, Latvian SSR, Soviet Union
- Citizenship: Latvia
- Party: DPS (1998–1999); LC (1999–2001); TSP (2002–2004); LPP (2004–2007); LPP/LC (2007–2012); Honor to serve Riga (2012–present)
- Spouse: Nadežda Turlā
- Education: K. E. Voroshilov Military Academy of the General Staff of the Soviet Armed Forces

Dainis Turlais (born 24 November 1950 in Madona, Latvian SSR) is a Latvian politician and former Soviet and Latvian officer.

After being drafted into the Soviet Army in 1969, he continued his army service in the Group of Soviet Forces in Germany and became an officer, graduating from the Frunze Military Academy in 1985. From 1985 to 1989 he served as chief of the operative department of the 40th Army during the Soviet–Afghan War. He graduated from the K. E. Voroshilov Military Academy of the General Staff of the Soviet Armed Forces in 1990. He returned to Latvia after the collapse of the 1991 Soviet coup d'état attempt.

Before Turlais started his political career, he was commander of the Latvian National Armed Forces (1992–1994), until he retired with the rank of colonel. From 21 December 1995 to 10 July 1997 he was Latvia's Minister of the Interior. From 7 November 2006 to 5 March 2009 he served as a deputy of the 9th Saeima (Latvian Parliament), elected from the LPP/LC party.

In 2011, he was founding member of the Honor to serve Riga party. In 2013 he was elected to Riga City Council, and on 30 May 2019 Turlais was elected the mayor of Riga, but only after 21 days he was sacked in a vote of no-confidence by the Riga City Council, thus making him the shortest-ruling mayor of Riga.

Preceded by Nils Ušakovs	Mayor of Riga; 2019	Succeeded by Oļegs Burovs
