= Gundars Bojārs =

Latvian politician (born 1967)

5th Mayor of Riga
- In office 27 March 2001 – 29 March 2005
- Preceded by: Andris Ārgalis
- Succeeded by: Aivars Aksenoks

Personal details
- Born: 24 February 1967 (age 58); Riga, Soviet Union
- Political party: Latvian Social Democratic Workers' Party

Gundars Bojārs (born 24 February 1967 in Riga) is a Latvian politician. He was the Mayor of Riga from 2001 to 2005.

Preceded by Andris Ārgalis	Mayor of Riga; 2001–2005	Succeeded by Aivars Aksenoks
