= Jānis Birks =

Latvian politician (born 1956)

- Birks in 2008

7th Mayor of Riga
- In office 19 February 2007 – 1 July 2009
- Preceded by: Aivars Aksenoks
- Succeeded by: Nils Ušakovs

Personal details
- Born: 31 July 1956 (age 68); Riga, Soviet Union
- Political party: For Fatherland and Freedom/LNNK

Jānis Birks (born 31 July 1956 in Riga) is a Latvian politician. He was the Mayor of Riga between 19 February 2007 and 1 July 2009.

Preceded by Aivars Aksenoks	Mayor of Riga; 2007–2009	Succeeded by Nils Ušakovs
