= Alina Lebedeva =

Russian-Latvian political activist

Alina Lebedeva (Russian: Алина Лебедева, Latvian: Alīna Ļebedeva, born 1985) is a former Latvian Russian politician and activist known for slapping then-Charles, Prince of Wales with three red flowers in 2001 at age 16. In other actions, she allegedly set fire to a door of the Latvian Ministry of Education and was arrested for a political protest in Moscow.

== Early life ==
Lebedeva is of Russian ethnicity and grew up in Daugavpils, Latvia.

== Prince Charles incident ==
On November 8, 2001, Charles, then-Prince of Wales, made an official visit to Latvia. Lebedeva, then aged 16 (Lebedeva at that time was a schoolgirl of the 10th grade, Daugavpils 9th Secondary School), approached Charles as he was greeting people at the Freedom Monument in Riga and struck him in the face with three red carnations. The incident was reported by international mainstream media. Lebedeva was immediately arrested and taken to the Department of National Security. She was strip-searched, interrogated, and charged under statute 87 of the Latvian criminal code, which carried a maximum penalty of 15 years in prison. After three days, she was released from the detention centre and required to report every day to Daugavpils police station until the case came to trial. Lebedeva had intended the action as a protest against the killing of civilians during the war in Afghanistan but forgot to say anything until she was being bundled into a police car. She later told The Guardian: "I've got no idea what his views are on the war. I saw him just as a representative for Britain".

Prince Charles was on a five-day tour of the Baltic states and privately admitted that the incident had "frightened me rigid". However, he made a plea for leniency and the charge was dropped from assaulting a foreign dignitary to hooliganism, which carried a maximum prison sentence of two years. Latvian President Vaira Vīķe-Freiberga and Lebedeva's English teacher had already apologised to the prince. Eventually, the charge was lessened again; Lebedeva was sentenced to unspecified educational measures and put under her mother's supervision for one year. If Lebedeva had engaged in criminal activity or hooliganism, her mother would have been put on trial. Lebedeva subsequently gained the nickname 'Carnation Alina'.

== Later life ==
In 2004, Lebedeva re-appeared on Latvian news when she was arrested for allegedly setting fire to the front door of the Ministry of Education of Latvia in Riga. Lebedeva, who was 18 years old at the time, was arrested along with a 21-year-old man in Daugavpils. She was not charged, but a judge ordered her to be placed in detention for a week whilst the crime was investigated. The arson attack was allegedly connected to a National Bolshevik Party protest against a new law requiring that all schools teach mainly in Latvian.

BBC News reported later in 2004 that Lebedeva was amongst the National Bolshevik Party activists arrested after an action in which they invaded the Russian presidential offices in Moscow and hung a banner which read "Putin go away". Lebedeva was then jailed for two years.

Lebedeva stood for election as a Member of the European Parliament for the Motherland party in 2009. She was the second person on the Motherland party list, after the party's leader Juris Žuravļovs. Lebedeva then renounced politics and returned to her studies. As of 2012, she had earned a bachelor's degree in social pedagogy and was preparing for a master's degree.

== See also ==
- Katie Sierra free speech case – the case of an American teenager who protested the Afghanistan War at school
