= Riga City Council =

City council of Riga, Latvia

Riga City Council Rīgas dome

History
- Preceded by: Riga Town Council

Leadership
- Chair: Viesturs Kleinbergs (PRO)
- Vice Chairs: Vilnis Ķirsis (JV); Edvards Ratnieks (NA); Māris Sprindžuks (AS)

Structure
- Seats: 60
- Political groups: Government (34): PRO (11); NA (10); JV (9); JV (7); KP! (2); AS (4); Opposition (26): LPV (13); SV / AJ (8); SV (5); AJ (2); LKS (1); ST! (3); Independent (2)

Elections
- Last election: 7 June 2025
- Next election: 1 June 2029

Meeting place
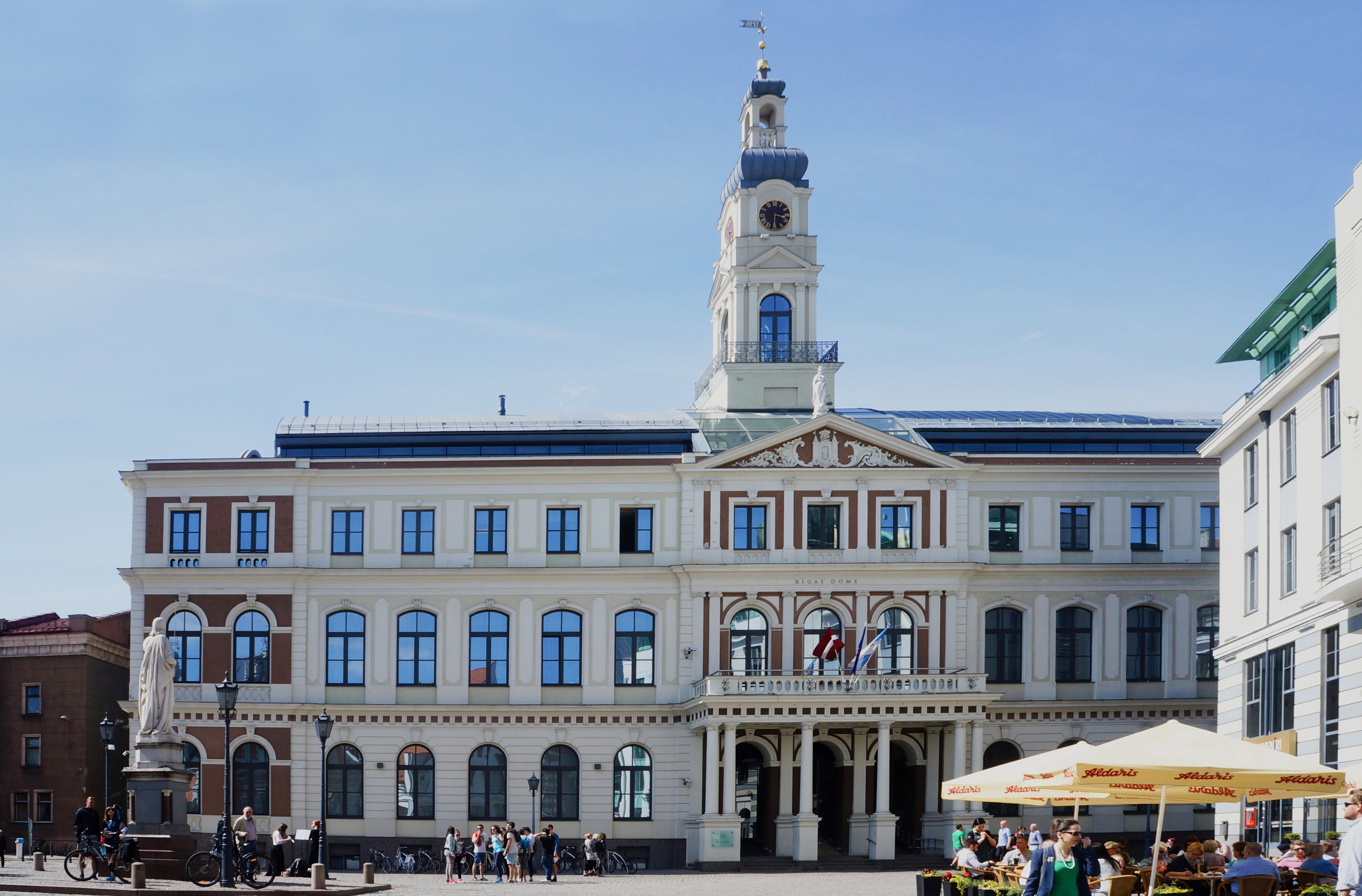
- Riga Town Hall

Website
- https://www.riga.lv/lv

Riga City Council (Latvian: Rīgas dome) is the government of the city of Riga, the capital of Latvia. Its meeting place is in the Riga Town Hall (Rīgas rātsnams) at the Town Hall Square (Rātslaukums) in the very heart of Riga.

The Riga City Council consists of 60 councilors who are elected every 4 years is established on the basis of party factions.

The work of the Riga City Council is organized by the chairman (occasionally simply called as the mayor of Riga), Deputy Mayors, the Presidium, City Executive Director, District Executive Directors, and the staff of municipal institutions and enterprises.

The Presidium of the Riga City Council consists of the chairman of the Riga City Council and the representatives delegated by the political parties or party blocks elected to the city council.

From February to August 2020 the council was dissolved by the national authorities due to irregularities concerning waste management. An interim administration of three members headed by Edvīns Balševics, State Secretary of the Ministry of Environmental Protection and Regional Development (lv), was appointed on February 25 to lead the city until snap elections were held. On 29 August 2020, elections were held, with the alliance between Development/For! and The Progressives winning the most seats.

== History of Riga Municipality ==
=== Early days ===
The heads of Riga, representing the town inhabitants, were mentioned in documents already in 1210. It is unknown when the first town council was formed, but the members of the Riga Town Council took part in signing treaties in Riga in 1225.

In the 13th century the town council governed the town and acted as legislature, but in the 14th century – also as a judicial authority. At the same time the town council managed the town protection problems, imposed taxes, represented the interests of Riga's inhabitants in international relations, signed agreements and appointed ambassadors. However, a communal assembly of Riga inhabitants preserved a great role in settling important and extraordinary problems. In the first half of the 13th century the councilmen of the town council were elected for one year, but at the end of the century already the town council itself selected successors to councilmen posts. The post of councilman position actually became a lifelong post.

The rights of the town council were restricted after Riga became subordinate to the King of Poland and Lithuania, Stefan Báthory (1581).

Disagreements between the Riga Town Council and guilds about the right of governing the town became aggravated at the end of the 16th century. It reached its culmination during the so-called "Calendar Unrests" (1584–1589), though the town council maintained its dominance. Discordance flared up again in the first half of the 17th century when guilds managed to gain support from Sweden which governed Riga at that time.

After Riga fell into the jurisdiction of Russia (1710), it became a province center, and after the reforms of 1783, Riga's local administration was governed by a governor- general. However, the town council, representing the interests of the German nobility, tried to preserve its influence in Riga. With alternating success it managed to do so by 1889. An administrative town reform took place in Russia in 1870, reaching also Riga in 1877.

=== The 20th century ===
The City Council and the City Board were formed, and the City Mayor was elected. During the Independent Republic of Latvia (1918–1940) Riga was officially recognized as the capital of Latvia (1931), with the Riga City Council governing it. After the governmental overturn of 1934, the Cabinet of Ministers became the head of the city.

After the Soviet occupation in 1940, administrative structure of Riga was reorganized. A provisional Executive Committee was formed. In 1941, the city was divided into six districts to facilitate police surveillance and management of nationalized properties. Such a system was preserved also after World War II; from time to time the number of districts and borderlines has changed. The Deputy Council of Working People (from 1977 – People's Deputy Council) governed Riga. It was elected once in two years (from 1979 – in 2.5). The council elected the executive committee. In reality these procedures were formal, and the city administration realized decisions inspired by the totalitarian regime's leading organs.

On May 4, 1990 the Supreme Council of the Latvian SSR adopted the Declaration on Restoring Independence of the Republic of Latvia, which introduced the period of rebuilding the structure of state power and administration in Latvia, including the Riga City administration reform.

The process of restructuring started on February 15, 1990 with the laws adopted by the Supreme Council on the local governments of rural municipalities, regions, towns and cities. Pursuant to these laws the People's Deputy Council from its members elected the chairman of the council, the deputy chairman and his/her secretary.

Andris Teikmanis, representative from the Popular Front of Latvia, was elected the chairman of the People's Deputy Council of Riga. Under the guidance of A. Teikmanis, the People's Deputy Council of Riga voted for using the historical coat of arms and banner of Riga - a symbolic contribution to the continuity of the city's heritage.

Simultaneously, major changes took place in the city life and in the work of the municipal structural units linked with the changes in property forms and in the formation of the city budget.

The law "On the Local Government of the Capital City Riga" passed on June 10, 1992, changed the city administration system in the very core. The Riga City Council, consisting of 60 councillors, became the largest administrative body of the city. 30 out of the 60 councillors were elected by the People's Deputy Council of Riga from its members and the other 30 were elected by the councils of the Riga City districts; five councillors from each district. Presidium and executive committee of the People's Deputy Council of Riga were abolished and replaced by the City Board consisting of 11 members. Andris Teikmanis was elected chairman of the Riga City Council. The district boards were established instead of executive committees, which were led by the executive directors of the districts.

On August 26, 1993, the Riga City Council passed a resolution "On the Reform of the Riga Local Government". It suggested to the Parliament to create in Riga a one-level local government with one administrative body, i.e. Riga City Council with 60 councillors and the executive body under the Riga City Council – the Riga City Board. On May 19, 1994, the Saeima passed the law following which the Riga City Council was elected in the municipal elections of May 29, 1994.

A one-level local government, the Riga City Council with 60 elected councillors, was set up in Riga. Māris Purgailis was elected the chairman of the city council. 11 Standing Committees were established (Finance Committee, City Development Committee, Committee for Housing Issues, Municipal Property and Privatization Committee, Environment Protection Committee, Education, Youth and Sports Committee, Culture, Arts and Religion Committee, Committee for Municipal and Transport Affairs, Social Affairs Committee and Order Committee, Committee for Matters of Foreigners and Stateless Persons).

Executive power was exercised by the executive director of the Riga City Council, whose deputies were also heads of departments (City Development Department, Property Department and Department of Finance). In the districts administrative functions were performed by the district boards appointed the Riga City Council; district boards were led by directors. Every district board included six departments, district commissions as well as branches of the Riga City Council directorates and departments.

The next municipal elections took place on March 9, 1997. Andris Bērziņš was elected the chairman of the city by the new council. On May 5, 2000, he was appointed the prime minister and already on May 9 the RCC elected his successor Andris Ārgalis. The RCC structure also underwent some changes. The council had to elect the chairman and two deputy chairmen from among its members. The number of standing committees was also reduced to nine (Security and Order Committee and Committee for Matters of Foreigners and Stateless Persons were abolished). Chairmen of the Committees formed the council's Board. The Riga City Council employs the executive director of the Riga City, to whom executive boards of the city districts and the Maintenance Division of the RCC are subject.

=== 2001–2020 ===
The next municipal elections were held on March 11, 2001. Gundars Bojārs was elected the chairman of the city council, and Sergejs Dolgopolovs and Aivars Guntis Kreituss were elected deputy chairmen. As compared to the previous Riga City Council, the number of standing committees increased to ten, by restoring the Security and Order Committee. The board of the city council was replaced by the Presidium of the Riga City Council.

After the municipal elections in 2005, Aivars Aksenoks became chairman of the city council. Deputy chairmen were Andris Ārgalis, Jānis Birks and Almers Ludviks (the latter replaced Juris Lujāns in summer 2005). In 2007, Jānis Birks became chairman, with Jānis Dinevičs replacing him as deputy chairman.

After the 2009 elections, the Harmony Centre and LPP/LC coalition came to power. Nils Ušakovs became Mayor and Ainārs Šlesers took office as Vice Mayor. After Šlesers was elected to the Saeima in 2010 on the For a Good Latvia list, his party colleague Andris Ameriks became Vice Mayor. In 2012 Ameriks created the Honor to Serve Riga (GKR) party out of former LPP/LC fraction members and formed a coalition with Harmony Center in the 2013 and 2017 elections, which they won.

The ruling coalition started to crumble in 2018 when, after a number of high-profile corruption scandals concerning Rīgas Satiksme and other municipal companies, Ameriks resigned in December 2018 with his party colleague and former Riga City Council Property Department head Oļegs Burovs succeeding him. In the wake of the scandals Ušakovs was also ordered to resign by Juris Pūce, the Minister of Environmental Protection and Regional Development (VARAM) in April 2019. At the same time, Ušakovs announced he would run in the 2019 European Parliament election in May as the leader of the SDP Harmony list, with Andris Ameriks right behind him. When both were elected, Ušakovs announced his resignation on May 29, with Burovs becoming interim council chair. After this, GKR member Dainis Turlais, the sole candidate for Mayor which was backed by both Ušakovs and Burovs, was elected as mayor on May 30 by the ruling coalition, with the opposition boycotting the vote. His term was short, however, as after only 21 days in office Turlais was sacked on June 20 after failing a no-confidence vote submitted by the opposition and supported by elements of the coalition, deepening the conflict within it.

After a short second stint as interim head, Burovs was elected mayor on August 19 with the support of GKR, Harmony and splinter groups mostly consisting of disgruntled coalition deputies. He defeated opposition candidate Viesturs Zeps from For Latvia's Development, which was also backed by the National Alliance faction, while the New Conservative and Unity factions abstained from voting. The fragile ruling coalition thwarted no-confidence votes that were called against Burovs by the opposition in December 2019. Burovs's term was also marred by fallout from potentially corrupt and mismanaged city policies, one of which became an attempt to entrust waste management in the city to a conglomerate of private companies for 20 years instead of a previous model which saw multiple companies compete for separate zones. This was blocked by the Competition Council of the Republic of Latvia as non-transparent, triggering Minister Pūce to call for a state of emergency in the city to be declared.

=== Since 2020 ===
Ultimately, in February 2020, after approving the request of the VARAM, the city council headed by Oļegs Burovs was dissolved by the Saeima and the President of Latvia, following three successive council meetings at which a quorum was not obtained and due to the failure to provide autonomous functions of a municipality established in the Waste Management Law. Snap elections were announced to be held on 25 April 2020 and an interim administration of three members headed by Edvīns Balševics, State Secretary of the Ministry of Environmental Protection and Regional Development (lv), was appointed on February 25. The election was later postponed to 6 June 2020 due to the coronavirus pandemic, and then ultimately to August 29.

After the elections were won by the alliance of Development/For! and The Progressives, they formed a coalition with New Unity, The Conservatives and the common list of the National Alliance and the Latvian Association of Regions on 4 September 2020, with Mārtiņš Staķis becoming the main candidate for the office of mayor. Harmony and Honor to Serve Riga were joined by the Latvian Russian Union in forming the opposition. Staķis was elected mayor on 2 October 2020. On March 24, 2022, Mārtiņš Staķis left Development/For! and continued as an independent. On December 13, 2022, For Latvia's Development faction decided to stop supporting Mayor Mārtiņš Staķis, leaving his coalition with the support of 34 councilors in council.

Gradually, in 2023 conflicts began to emerge between Staķis and the Vice-Mayors from the coalition parties. Ultimately, due to disagreements and disputes within the coalition regarding the investigation of alleged violations in the management practices and use of funds in the Traffic Department of the Riga City Council, Staķis resigned on July 3, with New Unity-appointed Vice-Mayor Vilnis Ķirsis stepping in as interim mayor. After difficult talks between the Progressives and the rest of the coalition, a new coalition was formed with Honor to Serve Riga replacing The Progressives. Ķirsis was selected as mayor on August 18, 2023.

== The Town Hall Building ==
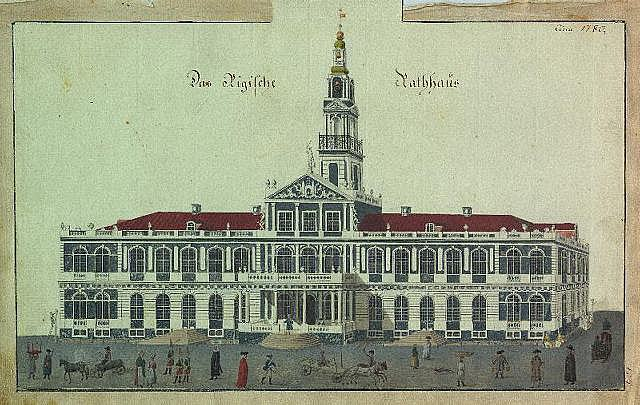
Riga Town Hall in the seventeenth century

Just underneath the Riga City Council building (destroyed in 1941 during World War II, rebuilt in 2003) is a narrow cobblestone street which is home to different souvenir and flower shops, a giant cascading waterfall three stories high and the remains of an ancient tree stub unearthed during the re-construction process. A small plaque states that when this oak was growing on the banks of the River Daugava.

== Mayors of Riga ==
Name	Photo	Party	Start	End
Ludvigs Vilhelms Kerkoviuss		Independent	1890	1901
George Armitstead		Independent	1901	1912
Vilhelms Roberts fon Bulmerinks		Independent	1913	1917
Gustavs Zemgals		Latvian Radical-Democratic Party	1917	1917
Paul Hopf		Independent	1917	1918
Gustavs Zemgals		Latvian Radical-Democratic Party	1918	1918
Voldemārs Pusulls		German-Baltic Reform Party	1919	1919
Gustavs Zemgals		Latvian Radical-Democratic Party	1919	1919
Rūdolfs Endrups		Communist Party of Latvia	1919	1919
Sīmanis Berģis		Communist Party of Latvia	1919	1919
Gustavs Zemgals		Latvian Radical-Democratic Party	1919	1920
Andrejs Frīdenbergs		Worker's Party of Latvia	1920	1921
Alfrēds Andersons		Democrats Union	1921	1928
Ādams Krieviņš		Latvian Radical Democrat Party	1928	1931
Hugo Celmiņš		Latvian Farmers' Union (until 15 May 1934)	1931	1936
Hugo Celmiņš		Independent (after 1934)	1931	1936
Roberts Garselis		Independent	1935	1936
Roberts Liepiņš		Independent	1936	1940
Jānis Pupurs		Independent (Soviet occupation)	1940	1940
Ādolfs Ermsons		Independent (Soviet occupation)	1940	1940
Arnolds Deglavs		Communist Party of Latvia	1940	1941
Hugo Wittrock		NSDAP (Nazi German occupation)	1941	1944
Arnolds Deglavs		Communist Party of Latvia	1944	1951
Edgars Apinis		Communist Party of Latvia	1951	1952
Vilhelms Lecis		Communist Party of Latvia	1952	1957
Ēriks Baumanis		Communist Party of Latvia	1958	1962
Jānis Pakalns		Communist Party of Latvia	1962	1967
Egons Slēde		Communist Party of Latvia	1967	1969
Gunārs Ziemelis		Communist Party of Latvia	1969	1976
Mečislavs Dubra		Communist Party of Latvia	1976	1984
Alfrēds Rubiks		Communist Party of Latvia	1984	1990
Andris Teikmanis		Popular Front of Latvia	1990	1994
Māris Purgailis		Latvian National Independence Movement	1994	1997
Andris Bērziņš		Latvian Way	1997	2000
Andris Ārgalis		For Fatherland and Freedom/LNNK	2000	2001
Gundars Bojārs		Latvian Social Democratic Workers' Party	2001	2005
Aivars Aksenoks		New Era Party	2005	2007
Jānis Birks		For Fatherland and Freedom/LNNK	2007	2009
Nils Ušakovs		Harmony	2009	2019
Oļegs Burovs (acting)		Honor to serve Riga	2019	2019
Dainis Turlais		Honor to serve Riga	2019	2019
Oļegs Burovs (acting)		Honor to serve Riga	2019	2019
Oļegs Burovs		Honor to serve Riga	2019	2020
Office suspended (25 February – 2 October 2020); Duties of the city council were performed by an interim administration: Edvīns Balševics (representative of the Ministry of Environmental Protection and Regional Development), Artis Lapiņš (representative of the Ministry of Finance), Aleksejs Remesovs (representative of the Ministry of Justice)
Mārtiņš Staķis		Development/For! (Note: Elected on the joint list between Development/For! and The Progressives, was a member of Movement For!) (2017-2022)	2020	2023
Vilnis Ķirsis		New Unity	2023	2025
Viesturs Kleinbergs		The Progressives	2025	Incumbent

== See also ==
- Timeline of Riga
