= The Progressives (Latvia) =

Latvian political party

The Progressives Progresīvie
- Abbreviation: PRO
- Secretary-General: Justīne Panteļējeva
- Chairpersons: Agnese Lāce; Andris Šuvajevs
- Founder: Ansis Dobelis (association); Māris Graudiņš (party)
- Founded: 26 March 2011; 15 years ago (association); 25 February 2017; 9 years ago (party)
- Split from: Latvian Social Democratic Workers' Party
- Headquarters: Ernesta Birznieka-Upīša iela 20, Riga
- Membership (2022): 834
- Ideology: Social democracy; Green politics; Pro-Europeanism
- Political position: Centre-left to left-wing
- European affiliation: European Green Party
- European Parliament group: Greens–European Free Alliance
- Colors: Red; Green
- Saeima: 10 / 100
- European Parliament: 1 / 9
- Riga City Council: 11 / 60

Website
- progresivie.lv

The Progressives (Latvian: Progresīvie ['pɾɔgɾesiːviɛ], PRO) is a social democratic and green political party in Latvia. The party was founded on 25 February 2017. Since 4 September 2021 its leaders have been Antoņina Ņenaševa and Atis Švinka. The Progressives have 11 seats on Riga City Council and 10 seats in the Saeima and one seat in the European Parliament. It was a junior partner in the Siliņa cabinet until May 2026.

== History ==
The party is a successor of a social-democratic NGO of the same name (Latvian: biedrība "Progresīvie") that was founded on 26 March 2011 and was led by Ansis Dobelis. The Progressives participated in the 2017 Latvian municipal elections in four municipalities. In two of these, Aizpute and Mārupe Municipality, they won seats on the local councils.

The Progressives participated in the 2018 parliamentary election. Prior to the election, the party declined to join the liberal alliance Development/For!. The Progressives argued that staying out of the alliance was necessary to ensure that the party's left-wing policies and high standard for political donations were not compromised. Women were chosen as leaders for all of their election lists. The Progressives Prime Minister candidate was Roberts Putnis. The party did not win any seats in the Saeima, receiving only 2.6% of the vote, but qualifying for state funding of €15,000 per year for surpassing the 2% threshold.

In May 2019, the Progressives participated in the 2019 European Parliament election. They ran with the slogan "More Europe" on a federalist platform, with their main proposals concerning social policy and green politics. Although polling at 4.5% in March and 4.3% in April they ultimately received only 2.9% of the vote. After the election, on 28 May, Roberts Putnis resigned as party leader. That year they also organised a small protest against the Turkish offensive into north-eastern Syria in front of the Turkish embassy in Riga, as well as pickets against a labour law reform that was deemed to degrade workers rights and weaken labour unions.

In early 2020, the Riga City Council was dismissed and a snap election was called. Due to technicalities and the COVID-19 pandemic, the election was postponed until 29 August. The Progressives formed a common electoral list with the liberal Development/For! alliance, claiming that ideological differences are not as important at the local level and stressed the importance of toppling Riga's ruling SDP Harmony–Honor to serve Riga coalition that had been involved in multiple corruption scandals. The common electoral list won the election with 18 out of 60 seats, of which nine were members of the Progressives and 2 were independent city activists with ties to the Progressives. The Progressives' member Mārtiņš Kossovičs chairs the common City Council group of Development/For! and the Progressives, Edmunds Cepurītis is the chair of the housing and environment committee, and Viesturs Kleinbergs is the chair of the social issues committee.

In the October 2022 parliamentary election, the Progressives won 6.2% of the vote, entering the Saeima with 10 seats. In June 2023, the Progressives were accepted as a Full Member of the European Green Party. In September 2023, the party joined the new Siliņa cabinet until its fall in May 2026 after the Progressives pulled out of the coalition and returned to the opposition.

In the 2025 Latvian municipal elections, the Progressives fielded candidates in stand-alone lists or together with other parties across the country. Although the party did not claim victory in any of the municipalities or state cities, it claimed the 2nd best result in the capital of Riga, winning 11 out of 60 seats – ultimately forming a coalition with the factions of the National Alliance, New Unity (including Movement For!) and the United List and with the Progressives' list leader Viesturs Kleinbergs becoming the Mayor of Riga.

For the 2026 Saeima elections, the party's list of candidates also includes people from the Movement For!, We – For Talsi and the Municipality parties and NGO "Kopā Liepājai" ('Together for Liepāja') candidates. The list is led by Saeima Faction Leader Andris Šuvajevs.

== Ideology and platform ==
The Progressives state that one of their main goals is implementing the Nordic welfare model in Latvia, and the party political programme is called "Turning towards the Nordic countries". The party's principles include implementation of a progressive tax system, responsibility towards the environment, fighting against corruption and the shadow economy, an active state role in the economy, dropping GDP as the main measure of development, in favour of others which take the well-being of society into account such as the Happiness index, gender and LGBT equality.

=== Nationality and identity ===
The party is supportive of dual citizenship among the Latvian diaspora. It supports further state funding for Latvian-language education (as well as a 0% VAT on books published in Latvian) and the granting of free Latvian courses for returning migrants and asylum seekers, while at the same time also supporting minority languages in the school curriculum as a form of cultural diversity. They define themselves as inclusive and oppose ethnic segregation and discrimination.

=== Foreign policy ===
The Progressives subscribe to a pro-European ideology and support Latvia's membership in NATO. They are in favour of forming a common EU army, and believe that the EU should become a United Nations Security Council permanent member state, while at the same time desiring to abolish permanent members' singular veto power.

The party condemns what they dub the "aggressive policy of the Russian ruling regime". They do not recognise the annexation of Crimea by the Russian Federation and have called for an investigation into the "human rights violations in Russian-occupied Crimea". They advocate a strong Latvian role in defending "a world order based on international norms", seeing the European Union as crucial for guaranteeing Latvia's independence. They believe that Latvia must remain an active member of NATO's Eastern Flank and advocate accomplishing as much by maintaining strong collaboration with NATO, the NB8+, Poland, the UK, and Ukraine in its defense against Russian aggression.

They condemn Israel's actions against Palestinians and support a two-state solution based on the 1967 borders.

=== Economy ===
The Progressives call on the Latvian state to abandon neoliberal economic policies and the "Russian-style" of restraint toward economic interventionism, instead calling for active state participation in the national economy. They are in favour of trade diversification aimed at reducing Latvia's dependence on Russian cargo and advocate for state funding for small and medium-sized enterprises, start-ups and companies that adhere to their social and environmental criteria.

== Election results ==
=== Legislative elections ===
Election	Party leader	Performance					Rank	Government
Election	Party leader	Votes	%	± pp	Seats	+/–	Rank	Government
2018	Roberts Putnis	22,078	2.63	New	0 / 100	New	10th	Extra-parliamentary
2022	Kaspars Briškens	56,327	6.23	▲3.60	10 / 100	▲10	▲7th	Opposition (2022–2023)
2022	Kaspars Briškens	56,327	6.23	▲3.60	10 / 100	▲10	▲7th	Coalition (2023–2026)
2022	Kaspars Briškens	56,327	6.23	▲3.60	10 / 100	▲10	▲7th	Opposition (2026)
2026	Andris Šuvajevs	63,382	7.98	▲1.75	10 / 100	0	▲5th	Opposition

=== European Parliament elections ===
Election	List leader	Votes	%	Seats	+/–	EP Group
2019	Gunta Anča	13,705	2.91 (#10)	0 / 8	New	–
2024	Elīna Pinto	38,752	7.53 (#5)	1 / 9	▲1	Greens–EFA

=== Riga City Council ===
Election	Party leader	Performance					Rank	Government
Election	Party leader	Votes	%	± pp	Seats	+/–	Rank	Government
2020	Mārtiņš Kossovičs	44,759	26.14 (AP!-PRO (Note: AP!-PRO list won 18 seats – 4 to LA – 3 to KP! – 11 to PRO))	New	11 / 60	New	1st	Coalition (2020–2023)
2020	Mārtiņš Kossovičs	44,759	26.14 (AP!-PRO)	New	11 / 60	New	1st	Opposition (2023–2025)
2025	Viesturs Kleinbergs	35,497	16.62	▼9.52	11 / 60	Steady	▼2nd	Coalition
