= Democrats Union =

Latvian political party

The Democrats Union (Latvian: Demokrātu savienība, DS) was a political party in Latvia from 1920 to 1934.

== History ==
The DS was founded in February 1920. The party won six seats in the 1920 Constitutional Assembly elections, becoming the joint fourth-largest party in the Assembly. Just a year later, its faction in the parliament suffered a split, with the breakaway faction joining the People's Party of Latvia, which soon faded in obscurity. The Democrats Union did not run in the 1922 parliamentary elections, and although it returned for the 1925 parliamentary elections, the party received just 0.2% of the vote. It did not contest any further national elections and, like all Latvian parties, was banned in May 1934 after the Ulmanis coup d'état.

Alfrēds Andersons, Mayor of Riga from 1921 to 1928, was a prominent member of the party.
