= 2013 Riga City Council election =

- 1 June 2013

All 60 seats in the Riga City Council 31 seats needed for a majority
- Registered: 413,893
- Turnout: 229,910 (55.55%)
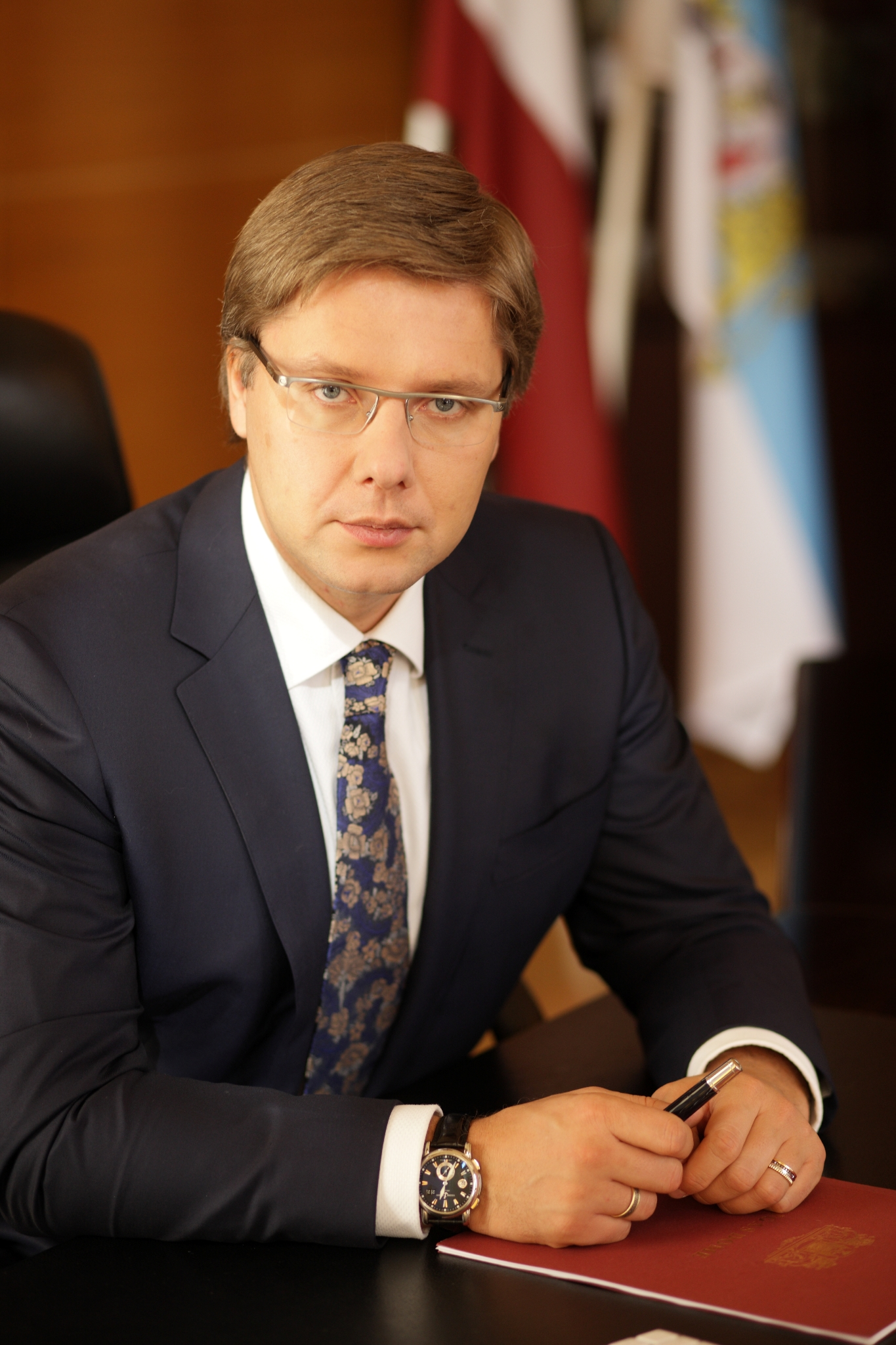

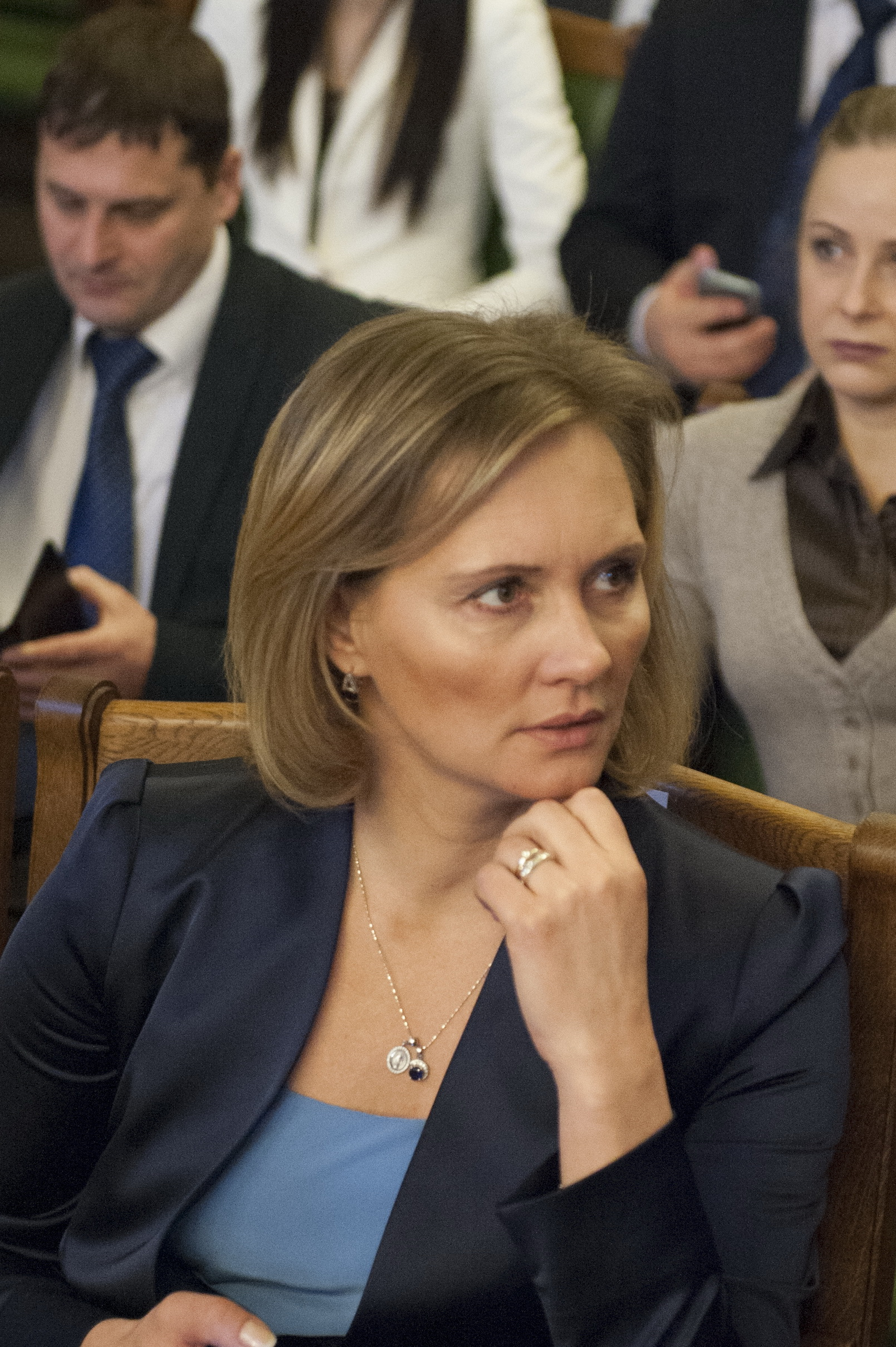

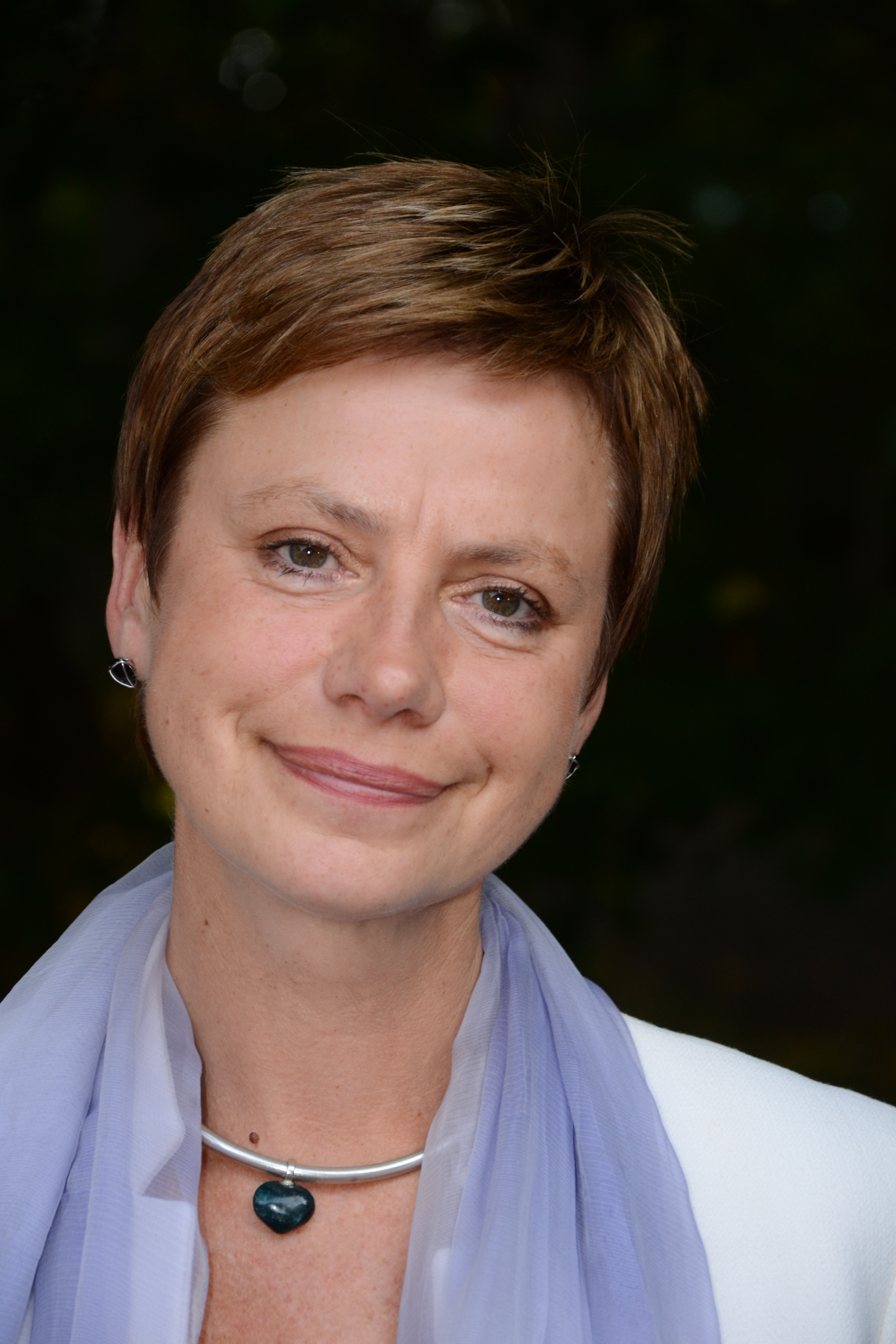
	First party	Second party	Third party
Leader	Nils Ušakovs	Baiba Broka	Sarmīte Ēlerte
Party	Harmony / Honor to serve Riga	NA	Unity
Leader since	27 November 2005
Last election	26 seats, 34,29%	0 seats, 5.17%	22 seats, 33.81%
Seats won	39	12	9
Seat change	▲13	▲12	▼13
Popular vote	134,117	40,920	32,367
Percentage	58,54%	17,86%	14,13%
Swing	▲24.25 pp	▲12.69 pp	▼19.68 pp
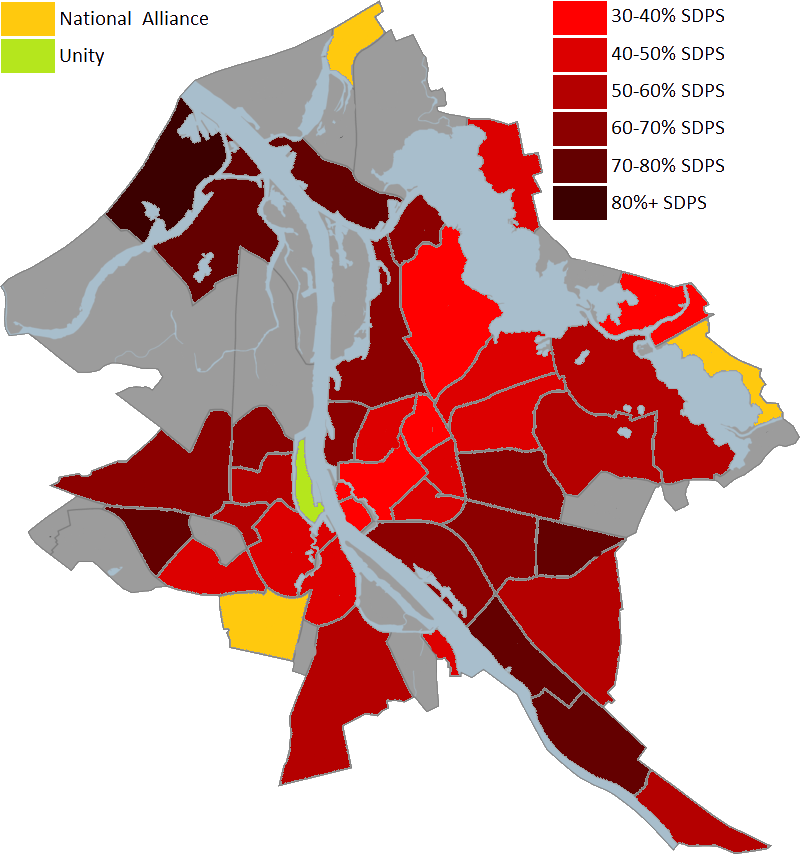
- Most voted party by city district.
Mayor before election
Nils Ušakovs
Harmony
Elected mayor
Nils Ušakovs
Harmony

The 2013 Riga City Council election was held on June 1, 2013, to elect Riga City Council, the unicameral local legislature of the Riga, as part of municipal elections across the country. At stake were all 60 seats in the City Council.

After 2009 elections Harmony created coalition with Christian-Democratic LPP/LC and Nils Ušakovs became Mayor of Riga. Ušakovs' popularity among Rigans had grown steadily, and 73% of the city's residents approved of Ušakovs' performance in December 2010. In 2011, LPP/LC party was dissolved and Harmony started ruling alone. In late 2012 Harmony united with political party Honor to serve Riga to participate in 2013 elections

As a result of the election, Harmony and Honor to Serve Riga union received 39 of 60 seats and in June Nils Ušakovs was re-elected as mayor of Riga.

== Results ==
=== Overall ===
Party	Votes	%	Seats	+/–
Social Democratic Party "Harmony"	134,117	58.81	39	+13
National Alliance	40,920	17.94	12	+12
Unity	32,367	14.19	9	–13
Latvian Green Party	9,144	4.01	0	New
Latvian Farmers' Union	4,306	1.89	0	New
Reform Party	3,622	1.59	0	New
United for Latvia	1,089	0.48	0	New
For the Native Language!	774	0.34	0	New
Action Party	541	0.24	0	0
Latvian Social Democratic Workers' Party	477	0.21	0	0
Alternative	370	0.16	0	New
For Independent Latvia!, Latvian Movement "Solidarity"	330	0.14	0	New
Total	228,057	100.00	60	0
Source: CVK
