= People's Servants for Latvia =

Latvian political party

People's Servants for Latvia Tautas kalpi Latvijai
- Abbreviation: TKL
- Leader: Aivars Smans
- Founder: Juris Žuravļovs
- Founded: 8 March 2004; 21 years ago (Motherland); 27 March 2009; 16 years ago (For the Motherland!); 22 February 2018; 7 years ago (For Alternative); 12 March 2019; 6 years ago (New Harmony)
- Headquarters: Riga
- Ideology: Populism; Anti-lockdown
- Colours: Maroon; White
- Saeima: 0 / 100
- European Parliament: 0 / 8

Website
- https://www.tautaskalpi.lv/

People's Servants for Latvia (Latvian: Tautas kalpi Latvijai, TKL), initially Motherland alliance (Latvian: Dzimtene), is a populist party in Latvia, founded in 2004. Its chairman was surgeon Viktors Kalnbērzs and its membership for most of its existence included currency exchange businessman Juris Žuravļovs.

== History ==
The founding parties of the Motherland alliance were the Social Democratic Welfare Party (founded by Žuravļovs in 1998 as the Welfare Party), "For Freedom, Social Justice and Equal Rights" (Russian abbreviation "ЗаСССР", meaning "For USSR") and the Latvian Youth Party of Jānis Kuzins. Since 2005 Motherland was represented on the Riga City Council, being elected in a coalition with the Socialist Party of Latvia. In the 2006 parliamentary election Motherland got 2.08% and failed to gain representation in the Saeima. The coalition was dissolved in 2008.

The coalition was succeeded by the For the Motherland! (Latvian: Par Dzimteni!) party in 2007. Alīna Ļebedeva unsuccessfully stood as a candidate from the party in the 2009 European Parliament election. From 2012 to 2018 the party name was VSK For an Independent Latvia! (Latvian: VSK "Par neatkarīgu Latviju!").

For the 2018 Latvian parliamentary election, the party was refounded by Žuravļovs and Kuzins in April 2018 as SDK Dzimtene (SDK Motherland) as a member of the For an Alternative (Latvian: Par Alternatīvu) alliance and advocated for the introduction of a syndicalist economy in Latvia.

Before the 2019 European Parliament election the alliance was renamed in March 2019, this time to New Harmony, taking inspiration from election competitors SDP Harmony and New Unity. The new list ultimately did not contest the election. SDK Dzimtene was renamed Par Jaunu Saskaņu (For a New Harmony) in March 2020, garnering 1,7% of votes in the 2020 snap Riga City Council election under the leadership of Tatjana Kargina. Kargina is the ex-wife of former Parex Bank chairman Valērijs Kargins.

In June 2022 the party leadership was taken over by the activists of the association People's Servants, a group founded during the COVID-19 pandemic to oppose restrictions. The leader of the group, Aivars Smans, became the new chairman of the party that was subsequently renamed People's Servants for Latvia.

== Election results ==
=== Legislative elections ===
Election	Party leader	Performance					Rank	Government
Election	Party leader	Votes	%	± pp	Seats	+/–	Rank	Government
2006	Juris Žuravļovs	18,860	2.09	New	0 / 100	New	9th	Extra-parliamentary
2010	Juris Žuravļovs	Did not participate						Extra-parliamentary
2011	Juris Žuravļovs	Did not participate						Extra-parliamentary
2014	Juris Žuravļovs	Did not participate						Extra-parliamentary
2018	Juris Žuravļovs	2,900	0.35	▼1.74	0 / 100	0	▼13th	Extra-parliamentary
2022	Aivars Smans	9,176	1.02	▲0.67	0 / 100	0	▼16th	Extra-parliamentary
