= Oļegs Burovs =

Latvian politician (born 1960)

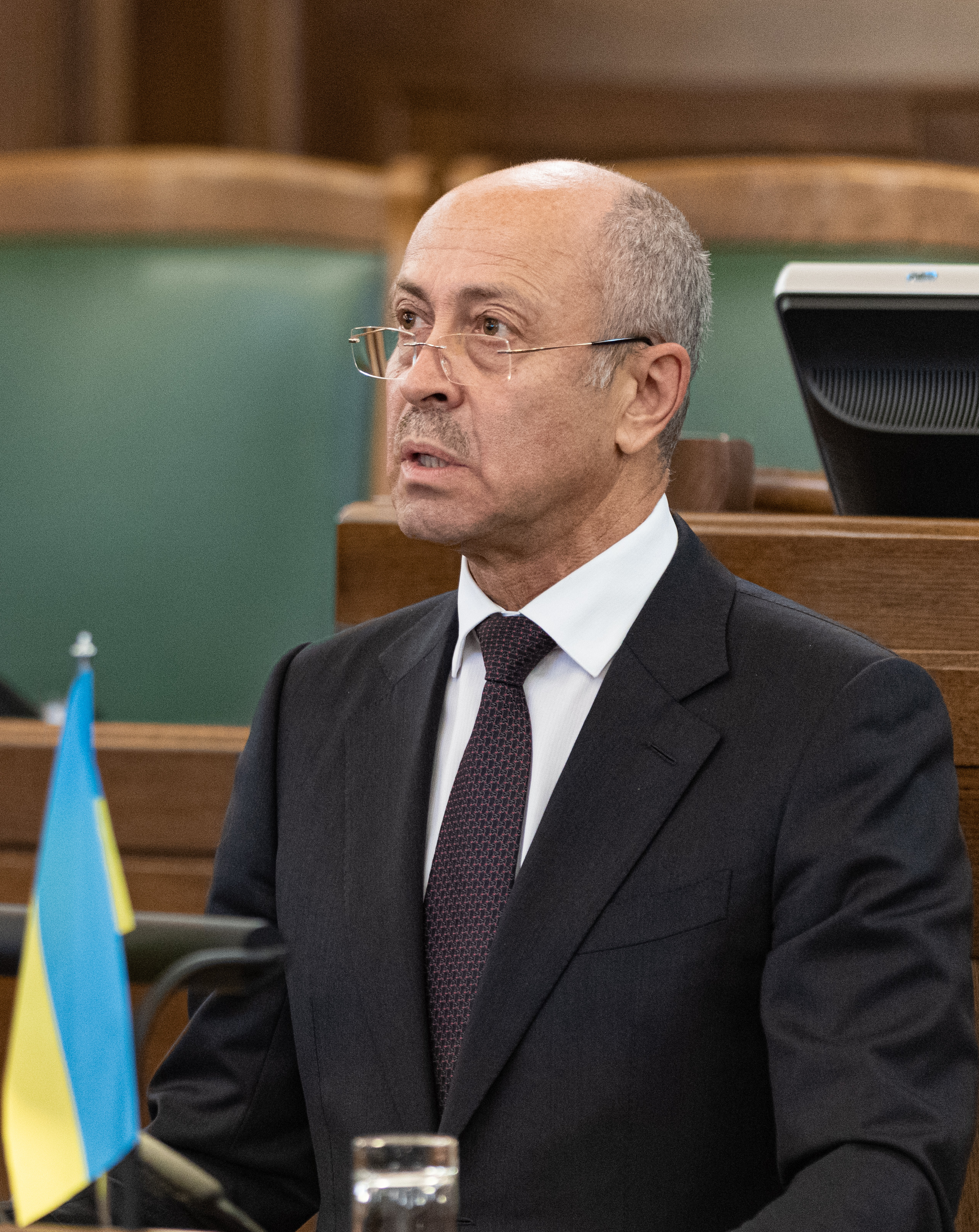

10th Mayor of Riga
- In office 19 August 2019 – 24 February 2020
- Deputy: Anna Vladova
- Preceded by: Dainis Turlais
- Succeeded by: Temporarily dissolved (Mārtiņš Staķis since 2 October 2020)

Personal details
- Born: 5 August 1960 (age 66) Riga, Latvian SSR, Soviet Union (now Latvia)
- Citizenship: Latvia
- Party: LC (until 2004); Honor to serve Riga (2012–present)
- Education: Academy of Labour and Social Relations

Oļegs Burovs (Russian: Олег Буров, born 8 August 1960, in Riga) is a Latvian politician who was the mayor of Riga from August 2019 to February 2020. He is a member of the Honor to serve Riga party and was a member of the Riga City Council.

Born in Riga in 1960, Burovs received a secondary medical education degree as a feldsher at the Riga 4th Medical School (now – RSU Red Cross Medical College) and a higher education diploma from the Academy of Labour and Social Relations in Moscow. After the restoration of the independence of Latvia he worked in the Ministry of Finance, the Privatisation Agency, municipal supply company Rīgas ūdens and various other private, municipal and state agencies and enterprises.

Burovs first entered politics in 2001 when he unsuccessfully ran in the Riga City Council elections that year as a member of Latvian Way, which he left in 2004. at the same time Burovs served as the head of the Property Department (Real Estate Department) of Riga City Council first from 1998 to 2003 and again from 2007 to 2017. In 2013 and 2017, Burovs was elected to the City Council as a member of Honor to Serve Riga on the Social Democratic Party "Harmony" ticket, although he gave up his mandate both time to continue in leading his department.

When Deputy Mayor Andris Ameriks resigned in 2018, he was replaced by party colleague Burovs. Subsequently, after the resignation of Mayor Nils Ušakovs in April 2019, he became Interim Mayor on 5 April 2019. After Dainis Turlais was elected mayor on 31 May, Burovs returned to the Deputy Mayor post, but after the sacking of Turlais, became Interim Mayor once again on 20 June 2019.

On 19 August Burovs was elected as the new Mayor of Riga, as which he served until the City Council was temporarily dissolved on 24 February 2020, by the Saeima and the President of Latvia after a request of the Ministry of Environmental Protection and Regional Development. An interim administration was appointed the next day.

Preceded by Dainis Turlais	Mayor of Riga; 2019–2020	Succeeded by Office temporarily dissolved Mārtiņš Staķis
