= COVID-19 pandemic in Latvia =

Aspect of viral disease pandemic

- Disease: COVID-19
- Pathogen: SARS-CoV-2
- Location: Latvia
- First outbreak: Wuhan, Hubei, China
- Index case: Riga
- Arrival date: 2 March 2020 (6 years, 5 months and 4 weeks)
- Confirmed cases: 977,804
- Active cases: 25,016
- Severe cases: 15
- Recovered: 551,818
- Deaths: 7,741
- Fatality rate: 0.79%
- Vaccinations: 1,346,184 (total vaccinated); 1,305,976 (fully vaccinated); 2,979,624 (doses administered)

Government website
- COVID-19 News (in Latvian)

The COVID-19 pandemic in Latvia was a part of the worldwide pandemic of coronavirus disease 2019 (COVID-19) caused by severe acute respiratory syndrome coronavirus 2 (SARS-CoV-2). The virus was confirmed to have reached Latvia on 2 March 2020, having been brought along with people returning from abroad.

The government declared a state of emergency on 13 March 2020 with a number of epidemiological safety measures and restrictions, primarily limiting gatherings, travel, most public venues, and educational institutions. As the new confirmed cases stayed in the low two-digit range per day, the emergency was periodically extended until mid-2020, when the confirmed infection case dropped to almost 0 and the state of emergency ended on 9 June 2020. Most restrictions were lifted.

The rates spiked again by the end of September, from a few dozen per day to low hundreds by November, and many of the restrictions were restored and tightened, including a range of new ones. Eventually, a new state of emergency was reinstated on 9 November 2020 with increased rules and restrictions, while the daily cases reached close to one thousand by the end of November. The number of cases kept rising at the turn of the year and the state of emergency was extended to 6 April 2021. The vaccination programme began at the start of the year.

As of 21 January 2023, 2,974,692 COVID-19 vaccine doses had been administered in Latvia.

== Background ==
On 12 January 2020, the World Health Organization (WHO) confirmed that a novel coronavirus was the cause of a respiratory illness in a cluster of people in Wuhan City, Hubei Province, China, which was reported to the WHO on 31 December 2019.

The case fatality ratio for COVID-19 has been much lower than SARS of 2003, but the transmission has been significantly greater, with a significant total death toll.

== Timeline ==
COVID-19 Latvia March timeline

Affected municipalities and cities of the Republic

=== January 2020 ===
On 31 January 2020, the Ministry of Foreign Affairs of Latvia updated their travel advice, calling on travellers not to travel to Hubei and assess the need to travel to China in general. It also recommended everyone returning from China and experiencing symptoms of the coronavirus infection to seek medical advice and information about their travel and contacts.

=== February 2020 ===
On 3 February, a Latvian citizen living in Wuhan was evacuated with a French government plane and taken to Paris, where she was quarantined for 14 days before being allowed to depart to Riga. On 11 February, Latvia donated protective clothing, masks, respirators and other epidemic prevention and control supplies to China.

On 27 February, Estonia confirmed the first COVID-19 case, an Iranian citizen fell ill on board a bus from Riga to Tallinn and called himself an ambulance from Tallinn bus station. He had originally departed from Iran, and flown from Turkey to Riga, spending at least 2.5 hours in Riga and using public transport. By 2 March, 114 people had been tested for COVID-19, all tests coming out negative.

=== March 2020 ===
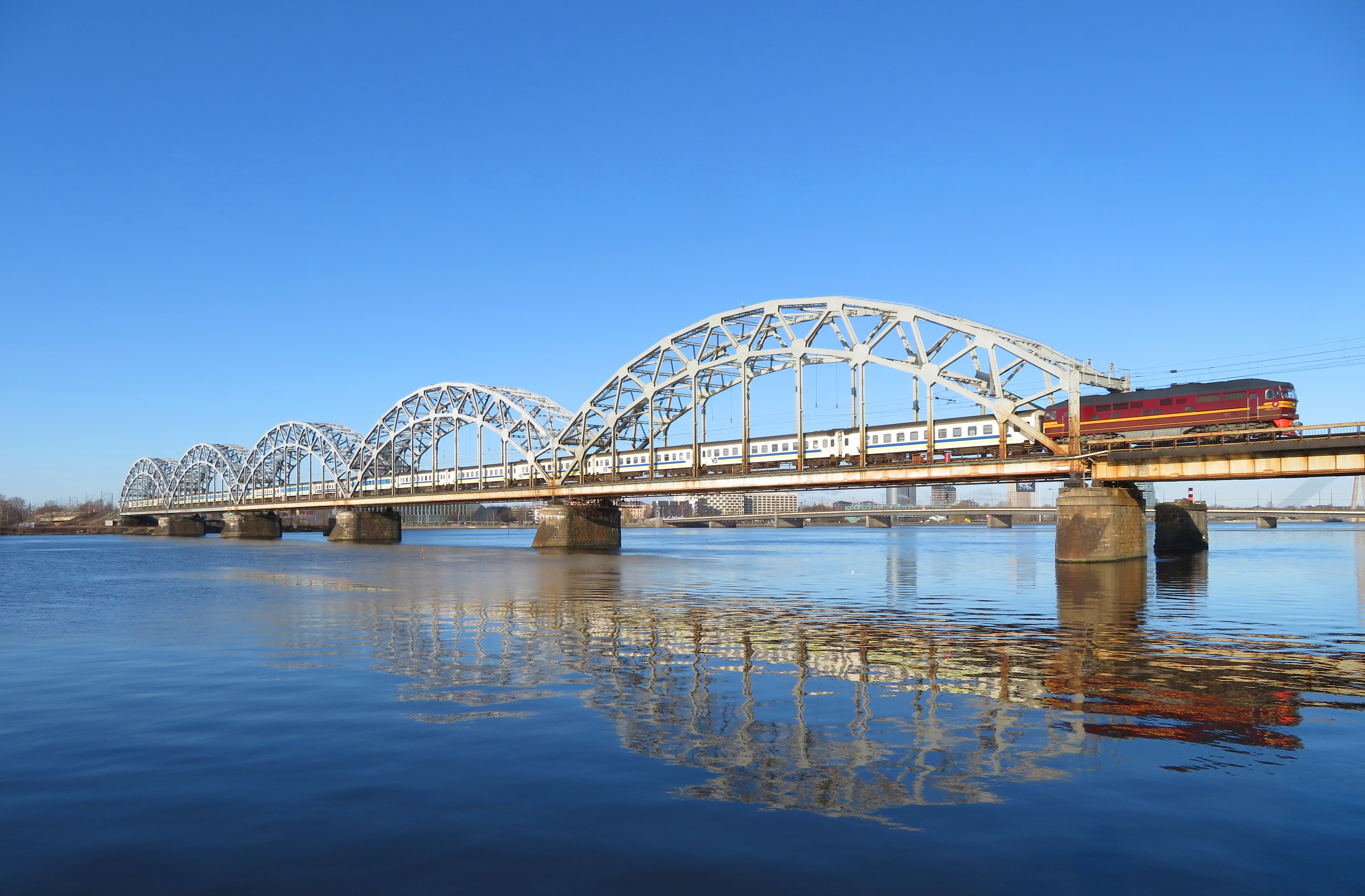
Train from Kyiv repatriating Latvian nationals on 22 March

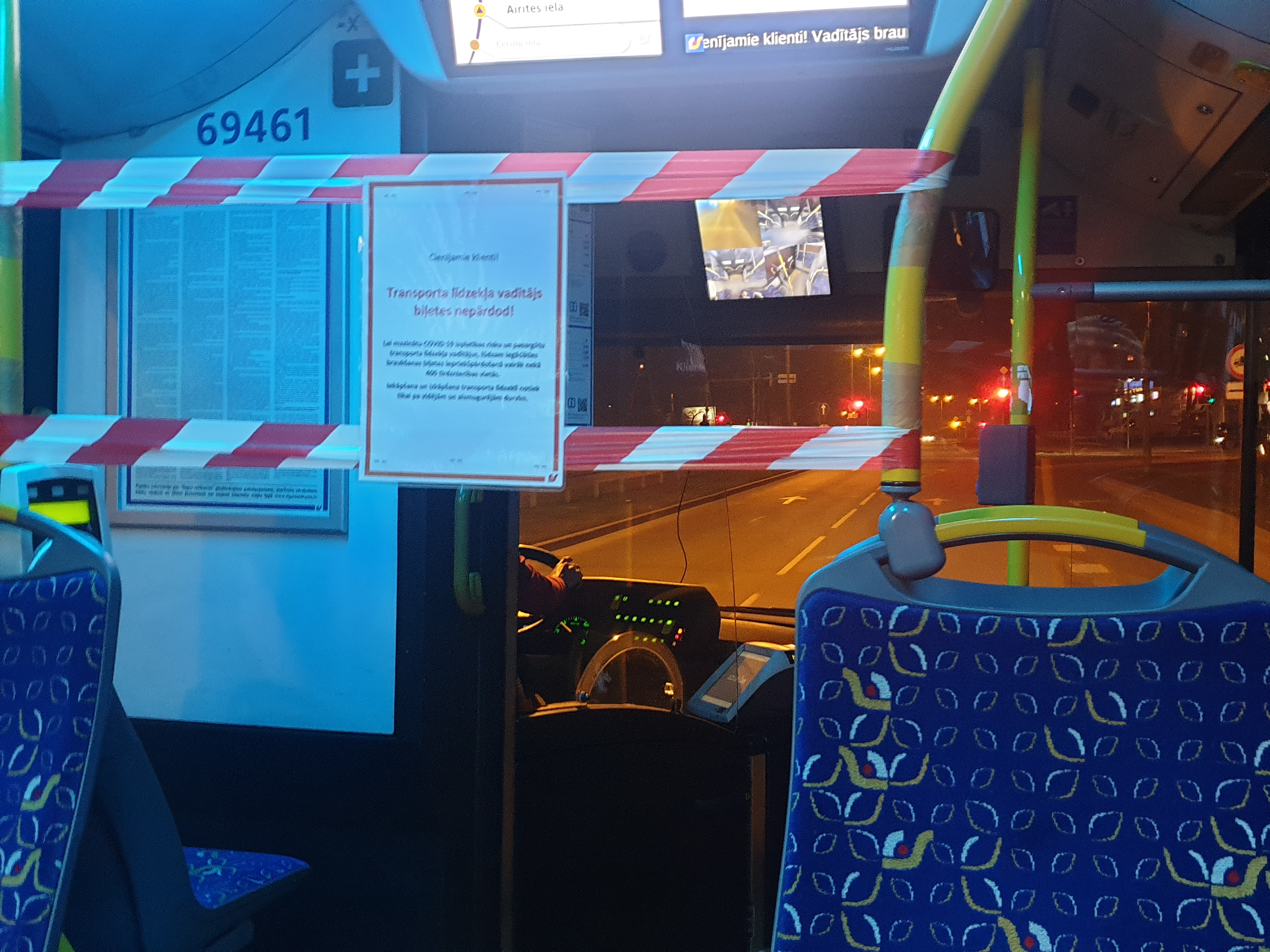
Restrictions in Riga public transport on 26 March

On 2 March, the Latvian Ministry of Health confirmed the first positive case of COVID-19 in Latvia. The infected person was a woman who had flown from Milan to Riga through Munich. The day after her condition had improved considerably and a repeated test came out negative she was discharged from the Latvian Center of Infectious Diseases with instructions to remain in self-insolation for 14 days. The same day the Latvian government allocated an additional 2.6 million euros to the Ministry of Health for various anti-coronavirus measures. Minister of Health Ilze Viņķele rated country's preparedness for coronavirus 8 out of 10. Between 8 and 10 March, the Latvian Centre for Disease Prevention and Control carried out 274 tests and confirmed seven more cases for people who had recently returned from Northern Italy.

On 12 March, Prime Minister Krišjānis Kariņš announced that the government had declared a state of emergency and that starting 13 March and until 14 April large public gatherings with over 200 people were banned and schools would conduct distance learning, along with other safety recommendations.

On 13 March, the government announced a billion euros of support for businesses affected by coronavirus provided as "financial instruments" (such as tax holidays or sick leave pay) via the state-owned ALTUM development bank.

A list of emergency measures took effect on 14 March. On 14 March, Kariņš announced that starting 17 March international travel would be halted, however, this would not affect private travel within the European Union, returning citizens or flow of goods. Furthermore, organised public events are banned and other gatherings may not exceed 50 participants.

In preparation for a possible COVID-19 patient influx, most of the hospitals began reducing or stopping most unrelated scheduled and outpatient treatment, with the exception of critical operations. On 25 March the Centre for Disease Prevention and Control Infectious Disease Risk Analysis and Prevention Department director Jurijs Perevoščikovs reported the first COVID-19 patients with no clear epidemiological links to any other infection cases or trips abroad, pointing to the start of COVID-19 transmission within the Latvian society.

On 29 March, the government adopted a number of stricter regulations. Foremost, everyone had to maintain a 2-metre distance and observe epidemiological safety measures in private and public events, as well as during public indoor and outdoor activities. Exceptions were given for 2 people, those living in the same household or parents and their minor children if they didn't live in the same household. New restrictions also prohibited all private arrangements (except funerals), public events, meetings, processions, pickets, indoor sports and religious activities. Trading and public catering venues were still allowed to hold more people while maintaining the 2-metre distance and observing safety measures. Various other measures were also adopted, such as prioritisation of medical item supply for national purposes or the government's right to request information from electronic communications operators on specific persons for epidemiological investigation.

=== Mid 2020 ===
On 7 April, The Cabinet of Ministers decided to extend the state of emergency by another month until 12 May with the same restrictions in place.

On 7 May, The Cabinet of Ministers extended the state of emergency until 9 June, but eased some of the restrictions. Notably, starting 12 May, outdoor and up to 3-hour indoor gatherings of up to 25 people would be allowed while observing the two-metre distancing and providing disinfectants. A mouth and nose cover would be required in public transport. Travel and tourism would also be allowed within the three Baltic states. By 22 May, travel from the EU was reopened. On 22 May, the contact-tracing app "Apturi Covid" (lit. Stop Covid) was released that could be voluntarily downloaded and followed Google and Apple API standards.

The state of emergency ended on 10 June, while restrictions remained in effect—face cover in public transport, 2-metre distancing, as well as various restrictions on gatherings and public events. On 16 June, the government met with various experts to discuss the possible second wave. Dumpis warned that the pandemic was not over and that the situation had to be closely monitored. Starting from 10 June, state-paid tests were made available. Originally intended to end at the end of June, state-paid testing was extended to the end of summer.

At the start of July, Dumpis remarked that the greatest risk of new cases came from travel and import of the virus from other countries. The small outbreaks observed the following week were attributed to personal gatherings. Due to the case increase, some restrictions were restored for catering facilities. On 15 July, penalties for not observing the self-isolation rules were approved. By the end of July, epidemiologist Jurijs Perevoščikovs, director of the SPKC's Department for Risk Analysis and Prevention of Infectious Diseases, said that stricter restrictions were not needed at the time. On 20 July, testing was made mandatory for guest workers, Perevoščikovs remarked that guest workers would not significantly increase the risk of infection.

After a regular weekly meeting, Levits and Kariņš stated that various contingency plans being made for the likely second wave of the virus.

Dumpis argued that keeping the rates low in Latvia relied heavily upon measures and stricter rules in other countries. By 25 September, arrival from all EU countries (except The Vatican) required self-isolation upon arrival in Latvia.

=== October 2020 ===
In October, the infection rates increased 11-fold from September. Use of face covers became mandatory on public transport on 7 October, and other public places on 14 October, along with other restrictions. Dumpis urged the prioritising of social distancing over masks. Rural areas saw a reusable mask deficit. By 19 October, Latvia had seen a record number of confirmed cases, and restrictions on gatherings and remote study were further tightened by 24 October. On 29 October, fines were introduced for not wearing a face cover in enclosed public places.

Testing also saw long queues in October due to lack of personnel, with up to 11 days in rural areas. Voluntary tests were suspended, and new testing locations were planned.

=== November 2020 ===
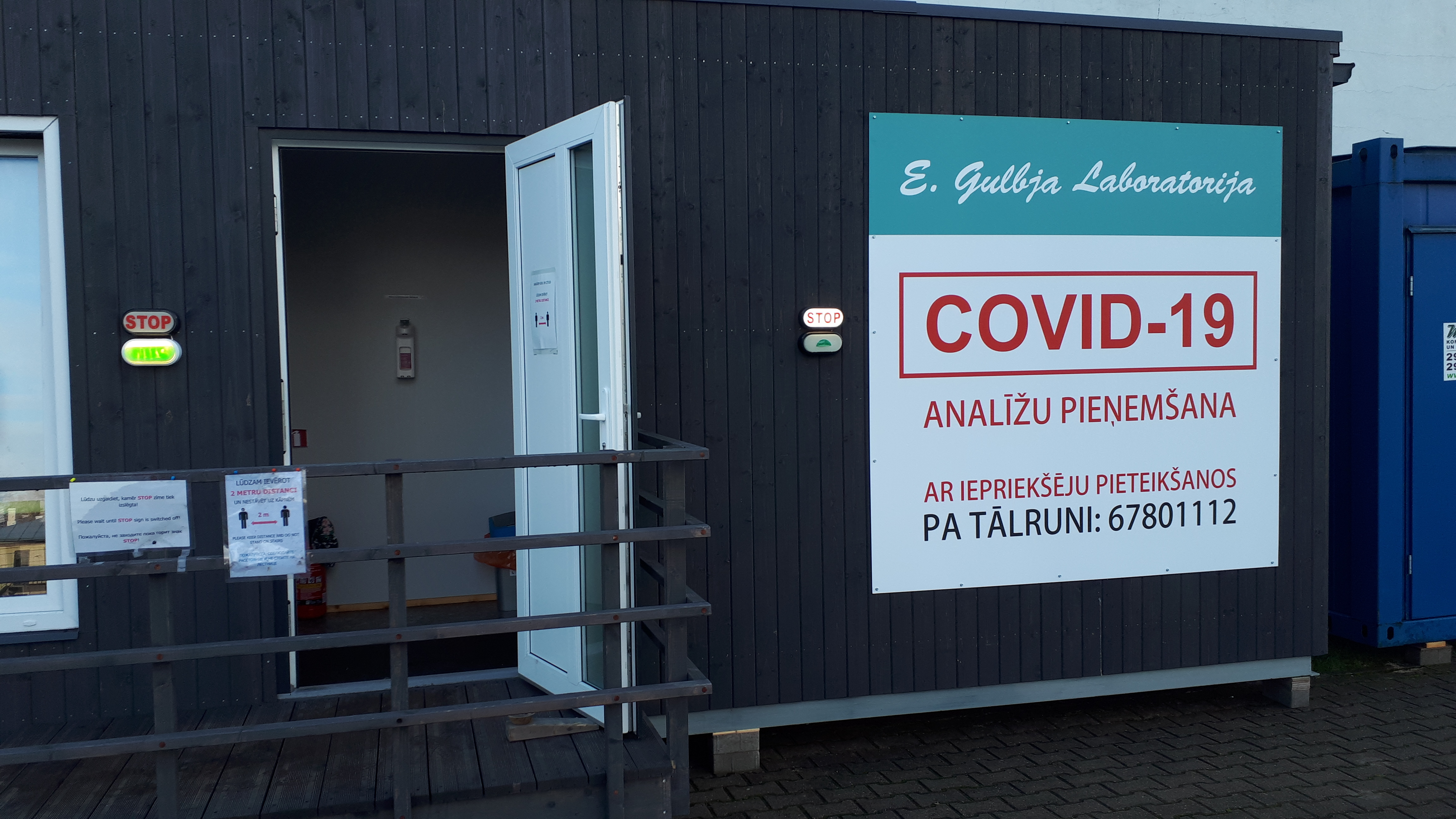
A COVID-19 testing point at Ķīpsala, Riga

At the start of November, the Cabinet of Ministers was divided on instating a new state of emergency, while Levits supported it. Dumpis explained that travel and mobility has been the cause of rapidly rising case numbers and that stricter restrictions were necessary because society had not fully followed even the light restrictions before. The SPKC reported that 50% of new cases could not be tracked to a source, and infected persons have many contact persons, which suggests that restrictions are not being observed. A study showed that social activity had returned to a level before the pandemic linking the decrease in social distancing with the rise of new cases. On 6 November, the government declared a second state of emergency to begin on 9 November. The restrictions on gatherings, events, sports activities, catering and education were further tightened. Following local outbreaks, municipalities and regions were faced with additional tighter restrictions, and the government announced that the list of affected regions would be reviewed every week based on the infection rate. Overall, the infection rates doubled in November. Dumpis had remarked that distancing restrictions were still likely not being observed as evident by the increasing case rates.

By mid-November, the testing queue waiting time had significantly decreased, following an earlier change in application procedures. As the case rate doubled in November, the testing only increased by 10%.

=== December 2020 ===
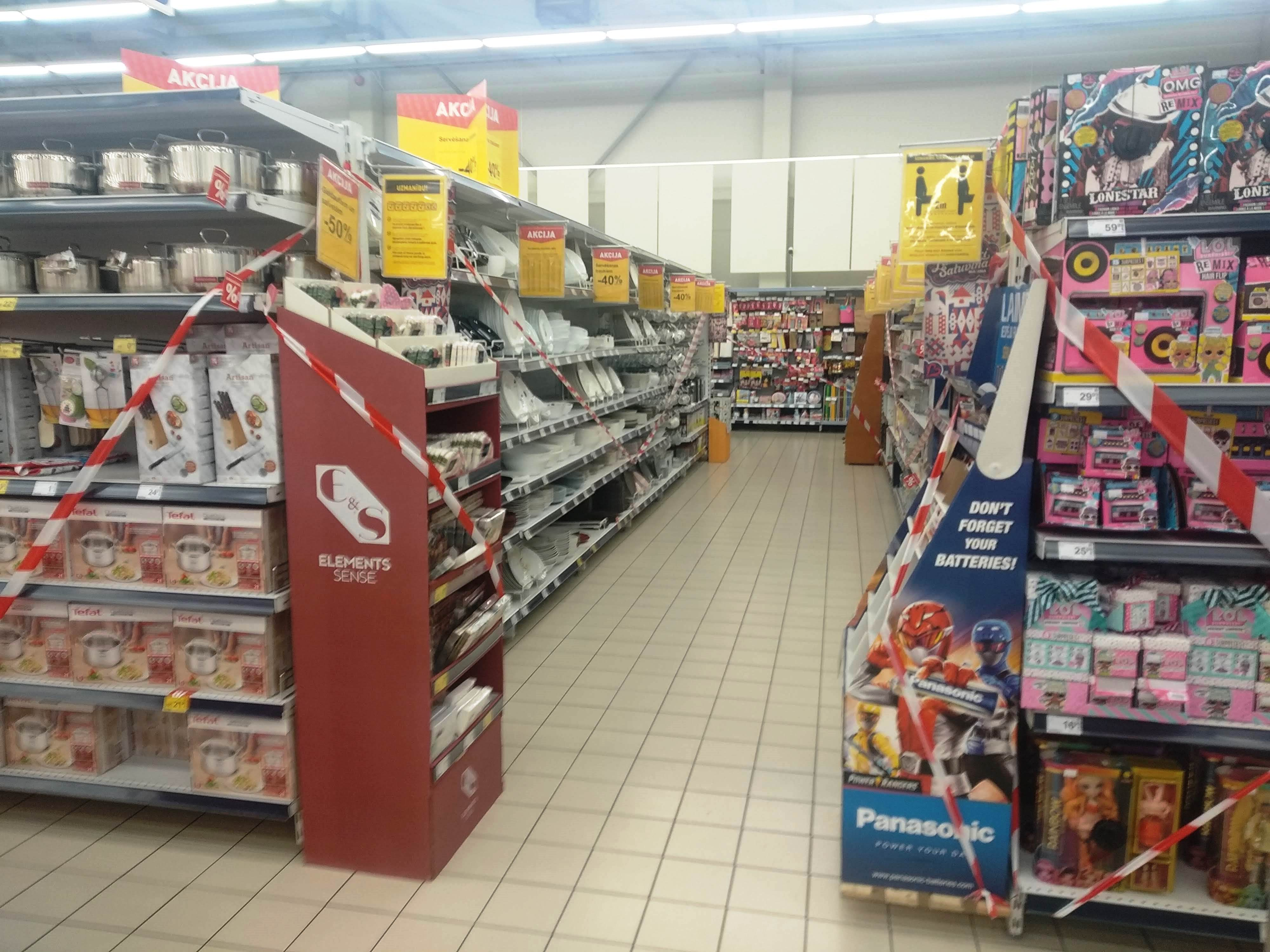
A ban in effect on selling kitchen accessories during December holidays in a Maxima supermarket to reduce the COVID-19 spread in Latvia

At the start of December, the state of emergency was extended until 11 January and a broader range of restrictions came into force. The government aimed to have 10,000 tests per day, which primarily meant having the testing sites open on weekends and holiday.

Following a further increase in daily cases and hospitals approaching capacity, a range of new restrictions were expected to come into effect on 21 December. On 29 December 2020, the government introduced a curfew for New Year's holidays and the weekend from 30 December until 4 January, and the weekend following Orthodox Christmas on 8 and 9 January, during which individuals had to stay at their place of residence between 22:00 and 5:00 except for emergencies and work-related matters. Viņķele stated that various restrictions were likely to remain throughout 2021.

Viņķele stated that vaccines would be state-funded and voluntary. The first batch arrived on 26 December, and vaccination began on 28 December.

=== January 2021 ===
Karins expressed mistrust in the Minister of Health Viņķele due to the lack of a vaccination plan and requested her resignation. Viņķele disagreed that the plan had not been sufficient, but resigned. On 7 January, Daniels Pavļuts was confirmed as the new Minister of Health.

The earlier restrictions, including the weekend curfew, were extended until 25 January, and later to 7 February. Pavļuts proposed that the restrictions could be lifted only if the cumulative number of new cases per capita would fall trifold.

On 5 January, the Ministry of Health presented a vaccination plan with an estimate of 50k vaccination a month and 16% of the total population in the first quarter of the year. A central vaccination bureau was established to facilitate a smooth vaccination implementation. In a survey, 38% of Latvian population said they would refuse vaccination.

=== February 2021 ===
At the start of February, Latvia had a death rate 32% higher than the EU average and COVID-19 was the third most frequent cause of death in the country. In the middle of the month, the occurrence of the more contagious virus strains had risen from 3% to 8% towards the end of month.

The government approved a "Covid warning system" based on a 14-day cumulative new case count. The system aimed to inform the public about the current levels of risk of the epidemiological situation and set restrictions accordingly. On 5 February, the State of Emergency was extended to 6 April with mostly the same restrictions in place, while the weekend curfew was not extended. Notably, additional travel restrictions were also instated for two weeks. The State voluntary vaccination registration website also began operating on 5 February. On 16 February, the government approved a one-time 500 euro childcare benefit payment plan to families for children aged 0 to 15, 15 to 20 for those still in education, and all newborns until 6 April.

On 5 February, a vaccination registration website for residents began operation, and phone line registration on 10 February. A priority group for vaccinations was established on 9 February. By 12 February, 93k people had registered for a vaccination. By 20 February, over 25k people had received a first shot and over 16k the second. Seniors over 70 would be the first general population group to be vaccinated. Pavļuts remarked that herd immunity would not be possible by mid-year.

=== March 2021 ===
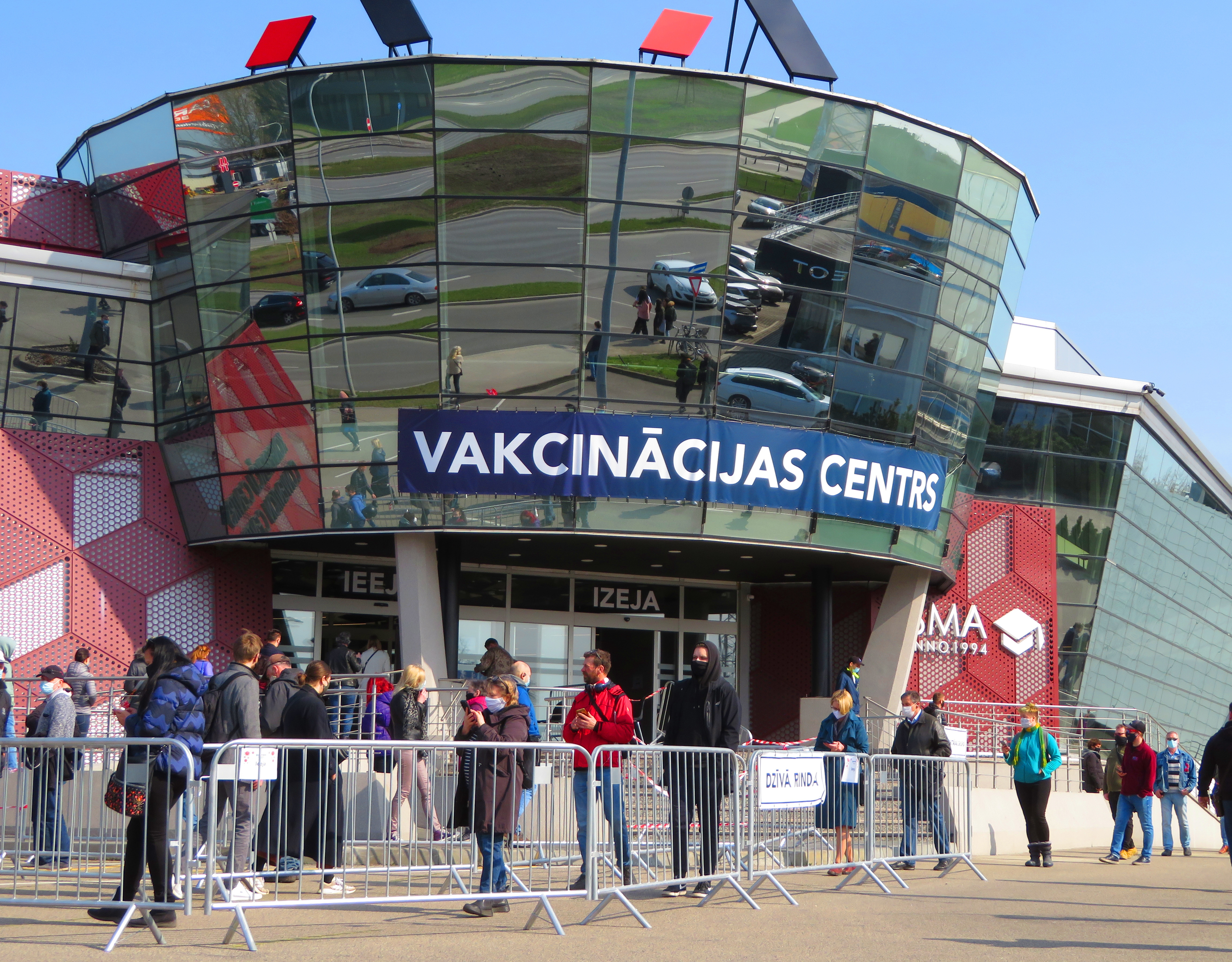
A queue in front of a vaccination center in Riga

At the start of March, over 9% of samples had the new strain of COVID-19, although it had not doubled, similarly to how it happened in other countries. On 12 March, the government decided on further restrictions to curb the spread of coronavirus and prevent the third wave of the new strain from spreading, in particular, this included remote work excluding essential workers and jobs that could not be carried out remotely. Dumpis said that restrictions could not be loosened at that time.

By the middle of March, at 5.1% of population vaccinated, Latvia was the second-lowest in the EU and EEA countries. Kariņš noted that the distribution of vaccines had not been proportional among the countries and Latvia had received proportionally fewer doses, however the EU responded to a common letter of several countries that this was not the case and countries were free to choose the number of doses received from their allocated amounts. By the middle of March, it was expected to vaccinate 3000 people a day, although the earlier goal of 2500 per day had not been reached and remained in the low 2000s. Vaccine delivery delays were also experienced and fewer doses were distributed to vaccination locations. Latvia planned to open eleven major vaccination centres, in addition to smaller centres. According to an SKDS survey, only 29% of Latvians would take the first opportunity to get vaccinated. Based on other country reports, the use of the AstraZeneca vaccine was temporarily suspended following further investigation. It was planned to resume its use.

=== April 2021 ===
On 7 April the state of emergency ended in Latvia. Although restrictions remained in place, only some shops were allowed to open. Later in April, Kariņš said that he did not expect the government to ease restrictions.

By 21 April, 10% of Latvians had received the first Covid dose. A presentation prepared by the Ministry of Health reported that 8.6 million doses of vaccines haD been earmarked requiring a little over €141 million.

=== May 2021 ===
Kariņš noted that new restrictions were unlikely to be set. The number of confirmed cases halved over May. On 27 May, the government approved various exemptions for vaccinated people. Having been closed since 9 November, bars and restaurants were allowed to reopen outdoor areas on 7 May with capacity restrictions.

Only 30% of older people had received the vaccine, while in Europe on average 80% of older people had already received the vaccine. Dumpis predicted that effects from vaccination against COVID-19 could be seen around Midsummer. A study estimated that 12% of Latvia's population could have had COVID-19 infection without knowing it.

=== June 2021 ===
At the beginning of June, over half a million residents had received at least one dose of the vaccine, this rose to a million by the middle of June During June, the vaccination rate was decreasing. Dumpis said that despite that people in the risk groups have had vaccines available for several months, the vaccination rates remained low among the group at below 50% compared to other European countries with much higher rates.

The number of cases had reduced by 60% over the preceding five weeks, and the morbidity rate per 100,000 inhabitants over a 14-day period fell below 200 for the first time since November. This indicator was still one of the highest in Europe. Various gathering restrictions were lifted.

=== July 2021 ===
By mid-July, the number of new infections was dropping by 36% compared to the preceding week, and remained at standstill towards the end of the month. The government planned for another expected outbreak in the autumn and winter. Further restriction were lifted for vaccinated persons.

The pace of vaccination continued to decrease and was the lowest since April and March, with over 35% persons having completed the vaccination process by the end of July. The option to get vaccinated at various shopping centres gained popularity. Dumpis remarked people's reluctance to vaccinate in Latvia and struggled to explain the reasons.

=== August 2021 ===
At the start of August, the newly confirmed cases increased by 30% compared to the previous week. By mid-August, the spread of the Delta strain had accounted for 95% of all cases compared to 18% in early July, and rose to 98% by late August.

By mid-August, 800,000 people had received at least one dose of vaccine. The pace of vaccination kept falling reaching the lowest numbers since March. Young people aged 12 to 17 were the most active in vaccinating. On 17 August, the government decided that vaccination could be completed by a different manufacturer's vaccine than the first dose.

The government announced that unvaccinated people could face tighter restrictions in the future. Meanwhile, the overall safety measures were not changed even though the threshold of the next risk level had been exceeded.

=== September 2021 ===
The number of cases kept rising in September, and by the second half of September new cases reached an almost 30% weekly increase, while hospitalisations increased by up to 41% and kept rising. The Emergency Medical Service began facing issues finding spots for intensive care patients. Two hospitals declared an internal state of emergency. A major problem in hospitals was the lack of nurses at intensive care units.

The vaccination rate continued to decrease, and reached the lowest rate in six months.

On 28 September, the government decided that from 11 October nearly all services and activities would have to be organised so that all staff and visitors had to be vaccinated, recovered, or have a negative test.

=== October 2021 ===
At the start of October, the number of cases continued to rise and reach record levels. On 11 October, a national state of emergency was declared for three months along with several restrictions. By mid-October, the highest number of new cases had been recorded since December 2020 with the number of hospital patients rising by over 50%.

On 21 October, a nearly month-long lockdown period began with strengthened security measures and restrictions on movement, including a curfew between 20:00 and 05:00 and suspension of the majority of stores and services.

The pace of vaccination remained steady at the start of the month and rose slightly towards mid-October. At this time, about half of the population had been vaccinated.

=== November 2021 ===
On 4 November, the Latvian Parliament authorised businesses to suspend and subsequently fire workers who refused vaccination or a transfer to remote work. The rules took effect on 15 November. There were exceptions for those with medical reasons not to vaccinate, and those who had recently recovered from infection.

On 12 November, Latvia's parliament voted to ban unvaccinated lawmakers from voting in the legislature or participating in discussions in person or remotely, and to suspend their pay if they could not work at the parliament. The restrictions came as a result of a surge in case count, and to "promote public confidence in the government's policies to control COVID-19 infections", according to the legislation's sponsor, Jānis Rancāns. Booster shots were recommended for all adults.

Over the months, the case incidence steadily declined, and the number of patients in hospitals fell. By the end of November, the cumulative number of COVID-19-related deaths passed 4000.

On 26 November, travel restrictions were imposed due to the new Omicron variant, including several African countries being the first countries to be placed on the "very high public health threat" travel "red list". Experts remarked that the new strain would eventually arrive regardless.

=== December 2021 ===
Booster shots vaccination took place at a steady pace, and one in ten residents had received a booster shot by the second half of December, making up 15% of among the 66% of population who had completed the vaccination process. However, the number of people getting their first dose fell. Latvia applied for 4.7 million vaccine doses for 2022.

By 6 November, the first cases of Omicron variant had been discovered. Random travel arrival screenings were performed. Experts expressed concerns over a case increase after the holidays and the potential patient influx due to the new variant. About 50 people were being hospitalized daily by the end of December.

=== January 2022 ===
The Omicron variant spread among the population. The new case count rose by 30% in early January. and by 50% towards the second half of the month. The case count continued to climb, with weekly case count doubling.

Around 15% of population received a booster shot. Covid certificate expiration date for primary vaccination was set.

=== February 2022 ===
A new record number of new cases exceeded 10,000 at the start of February, and surpassed 11.4 thousand cases by the middle of the month. The total number of cases passed 450,000 Over 1,000 patients were being treated at hospitals and 5000 total Covid-related deaths were recorded.

=== May 2022 ===
On 13 May, the 14-day cumulative rate per 100,000 people fell below 200 for the first time since September. On 15 May the requirement to wear masks on public transport was removed.

=== May 2023 ===
On 9 May 2023, the last remaining mask requirements, requiring masks in medical establishments and long-term social care facilities, were scrapped.

== Statistics ==
=== Cumulative number of cases, recoveries and deaths ===
View source data.

=== New cases per day ===
View source data.

=== Deaths per day ===
View source data.

== See also ==
- COVID-19 pandemic by country and territory
- COVID-19 pandemic in Europe
