= Honor to serve Riga =

Latvian political party

Honor to serve Riga! Gods kalpot Rīgai!
- Leader: Oļegs Burovs
- Founder: Andris Ameriks
- Founded: 17 March 2012
- Headquarters: Riga
- Membership (2018): 605
- Ideology: Regionalism
- Political position: Centre-right
- European Parliament group: Progressive Alliance of Socialists and Democrats (2019–2024)
- Colours: Blue, white
- Saeima: 1 / 100
- European Parliament: 0 / 9
- Riga City Council: 0 / 60

Website
- godskalpotrigai.lv

Honor to serve Riga! (Latvian: Gods kalpot Rīgai!, GKR) is a municipal political party located in Riga, Latvia. It was created on 17 March 2012 and is led by Andris Ameriks, the former deputy mayor of Riga.

In 2013 the party entered an electoral alliance with the centre-left Harmony party to participate in the Riga municipal election. The joint Harmony/GKR list won 58.5% and 39 seats, of which Proud to serve Riga received 15. Together the two parties control the Riga City Council. From 2004–2011 Andris Ameriks was a member of the Riga Council for the Latvia's First Party and thereafter Latvia's First Party/Latvian Way, a party of centre-right orientation. The majority of party members were former deputies of the LFP/LW fraction in Riga City Council.

In the 2020 Riga City Council election GKR ran separately from Harmony due to a previous breakup of their alliance, winning five seats and a later becoming a member of the opposition.

The only representative of the party in the Saeima is Oļegs Burovs, elected in the 2022 parliamentary election.
