= Second Straujuma cabinet =

The Second Straujuma cabinet was the government of Latvia from 5 November 2014 to 11 February 2016. It was the second government to be led by Laimdota Straujuma, who was the Prime Minister from 2014 to 2016. It took office after the October 2014 parliamentary election, succeeding the first Straujuma cabinet, which lasted 8 months.

Straujuma resigned on 7 December 2015, which led to immediate discussions on the new government. On 11 February 2016, parliament approved the new government of Prime Minister Māris Kučinskis.

Position	Name	Party	Dates
Prime Minister	Laimdota Straujuma	Unity	5 November 2014 – 11 February 2016
Minister for Defence	Raimonds Vējonis	Union of Greens and Farmers	5 November 2014 – 7 July 2015
Minister for Defence	Raimonds Bergmanis	Union of Greens and Farmers	8 July 2015 - 11 February 2016
Minister for Foreign Affairs	Edgars Rinkēvičs	Unity	5 November 2014 – 11 February 2016
Minister for Economics	Dana Reizniece-Ozola	Union of Greens and Farmers	5 November 2014 – 11 February 2016
Minister for Finance	Jānis Reirs	Unity	5 November 2014 – 11 February 2016
Minister for the Interior	Rihards Kozlovskis	Unity	5 November 2014 – 11 February 2016
Minister for Education and Science	Mārīte Seile	Independent	5 November 2014 – 11 February 2016
Minister for Culture	Dace Melbārde	National Alliance	5 November 2014 – 11 February 2016
Minister for Welfare	Uldis Augulis	Union of Greens and Farmers	5 November 2014 – 11 February 2016
Minister for Environmental Protection and Regional Development	Kaspars Gerhards	National Alliance	5 November 2014 – 11 February 2016
Minister for Transport	Anrijs Matīss	Unity	5 November 2014 – November 2015
Minister for Justice	Dzintars Rasnačs	National Alliance	5 November 2014 – 11 February 2016
Minister for Health	Guntis Belēvičs	Union of Greens and Farmers	5 November 2014 – 11 February 2016
Minister for Agriculture	Jānis Dūklavs	Union of Greens and Farmers	5 November 2014 – 11 February 2016
