= First Straujuma cabinet =

Government of Latvia led by Laimdota Straujuma

The First Straujuma cabinet was the government of Latvia from 22 January to 5 November 2014. It was the first government to be led by Laimdota Straujuma, who was Prime Minister between 2014 and 2016. It took office on 22 January 2014, after the resignation of Valdis Dombrovskis. It was abolished on November 5 the same year at the formation of the Second Straujuma cabinet.

It was the first government of Latvia, led by a woman.

Position	Name	Party	Dates
Prime Minister	Laimdota Straujuma	Unity	22 January 2014 – 5 November 2014
Minister for Defence	Raimonds Vējonis	Union of Greens and Farmers	22 January 2014 – 5 November 2014
Minister for Foreign Affairs	Edgars Rinkēvičs	Reform Party	25 October 2011 – 5 November 2014
Minister for Economics	Vjačeslavs Dombrovskis	Reform Party	22 January 2014 – 5 November 2014
Minister for Finance	Andris Vilks	Unity	3 November 2010 – 5 November 2014
Minister for the Interior	Rihards Kozlovskis	Reform Party	25 October 2011 – 5 November 2014
Minister for Education and Science	Ina Druviete	Unity	22 January 2014 – 5 November 2014
Minister for Culture	Dace Melbārde	Independent	31 October 2013 – 5 November 2014
Minister for Welfare	Uldis Augulis	Union of Greens and Farmers	22 January 2014 – 5 November 2014
Minister for Environmental Protection and Regional Development	Einārs Cilinskis	National Alliance	22 January 2014 – 5 November 2014
Minister for Transport	Anrijs Matīss	Independent	1 March 2013 – 5 November 2014
Minister for Justice	Baiba Broka	National Alliance	22 January 2014 – 5 November 2014
Minister for Health	Ingrīda Circene	Unity	25 October 2011 – 5 November 2014
Minister for Agriculture	Jānis Dūklavs	Union of Greens and Farmers	22 January 2014 – 5 November 2014
