= Straujuma cabinet =

Straujuma cabinet may refer to:

- First Straujuma cabinet (22 January 2014 – 5 November 2014), government of Latvia led by Laimdota Straujuma
- Second Straujuma cabinet (5 November 2014 – 11 February 2016), government of Latvia led by Laimdota Straujuma
