= Parties in the European Council during 2016 =

This article describes the party affiliations of leaders of each member state represented in the European Council during the year 2016. The list below gives the political party that each head of government, or head of state, belongs to at the national level, as well as the European political alliance to which that national party belongs. The states are listed from most to least populous. More populous states have greater influence in the council, in accordance with the qualified majority system.

== Summary ==
Party	1 January 2016		22 January		28 June		19 October	
Party	#	Pop.%	#	Pop.%	#	Pop.%	#	Pop.%
Party of European Socialists	10	35.79%	9	34.97%	8	33.85%	8	33.85%
European People's Party	9	34.96%	9	34.96%	9	34.96%	10	35.78%
Alliance of Liberals and Democrats for Europe Party	5	6.31%	5	6.31%	6	7.43%	6	7.43%
Alliance of European Conservatives and Reformists	2	20.25%	2	20.25%	2	20.25%	2	20.25%
Party of the European Left	1	2.12%	1	2.12%	1	2.12%	1	2.12%
Independent	1	0.57%	2	1.39%	2	1.39%	1	0.57%

== List of leaders (1 January 2016) ==
Member state	Pop.%	Leader	Party
Germany	16.11%	Angela Merkel	CDU-EPP
France	13.07%	François Hollande	PS-PES
United Kingdom	12.81%	David Cameron	Con-AECR
Italy	11.89%	Matteo Renzi	PD-PES
Spain	9.10%	Mariano Rajoy	PP-EPP
Poland	7.44%	Beata Szydło	PiS-EACR
Romania	3.87%	Klaus Iohannis	Ind. (Note: Supported by PNL)-EPP
Netherlands	3.33%	Mark Rutte	VVD-ALDE
Belgium	2.21%	Charles Michel	MR-ALDE
Greece	2.12%	Alexis Tsipras	SYRIZA-PEL
Czech Republic	2.07%	Bohuslav Sobotka	ČSSD-PES
Portugal	2.03%	António Costa	PS-PES
Sweden	1.93%	Stefan Löfven	S-PES
Hungary	1.93%	Viktor Orbán	Fidesz-EPP
Austria	1.71%	Werner Faymann	SPÖ-PES
Bulgaria	1.40%	Boyko Borisov	GERB-EPP
Denmark	1.12%	Helle Thorning-Schmidt	A-PES
Finland	1.08%	Alexander Stubb	Kok.-EPP
Slovakia	1.06%	Robert Fico	SMER-SD-PES
Ireland	0.91%	Enda Kenny	FG-EPP
Croatia	0.82%	Zoran Milanović	SDP-PES
Lithuania	0.57%	Dalia Grybauskaitė	Ind.
Slovenia	0.40%	Miro Cerar	SMC-ALDE
Latvia	0.39%	Laimdota Straujuma	V-EPP
Estonia	0.26%	Taavi Rõivas	RE-ALDE
Cyprus	0.17%	Nicos Anastasiades	DISY-EPP
Luxembourg	0.11%	Xavier Bettel	DP-ALDE
Malta	0.09%	Joseph Muscat	PL-EPP

== Changes ==
Date	State	Former		Newer	
Date	State	Leader	Party	Leader	Party
22 January	Croatia	Zoran Milanović	SDP-PES	Tihomir Orešković	Ind.
11 February	Latvia	Laimdota Straujuma	V-EPP	Māris Kučinskis	V-EPP
17 May	Austria	Werner Faymann	SPÖ-PES	Christian Kern	SPÖ-PES
28 June	Denmark	Helle Thorning-Schmidt	A-PES	Lars Løkke Rasmussen	V-ALDE
13 July	United Kingdom	David Cameron	Con-AECR	Theresa May	Con-AECR
19 October	Croatia	Tihomir Orešković	Ind.	Andrej Plenković	HDZ-EPP
23 November	Estonia	Taavi Rõivas	RE-ALDE	Jüri Ratas	K-ALDE
12 December	Italy	Matteo Renzi	PD-PES	Paolo Gentiloni	PD-PES

== See also ==
- Presidency of the Council of the European Union
