= Jānis Reirs =

Latvian politician (born 1961)

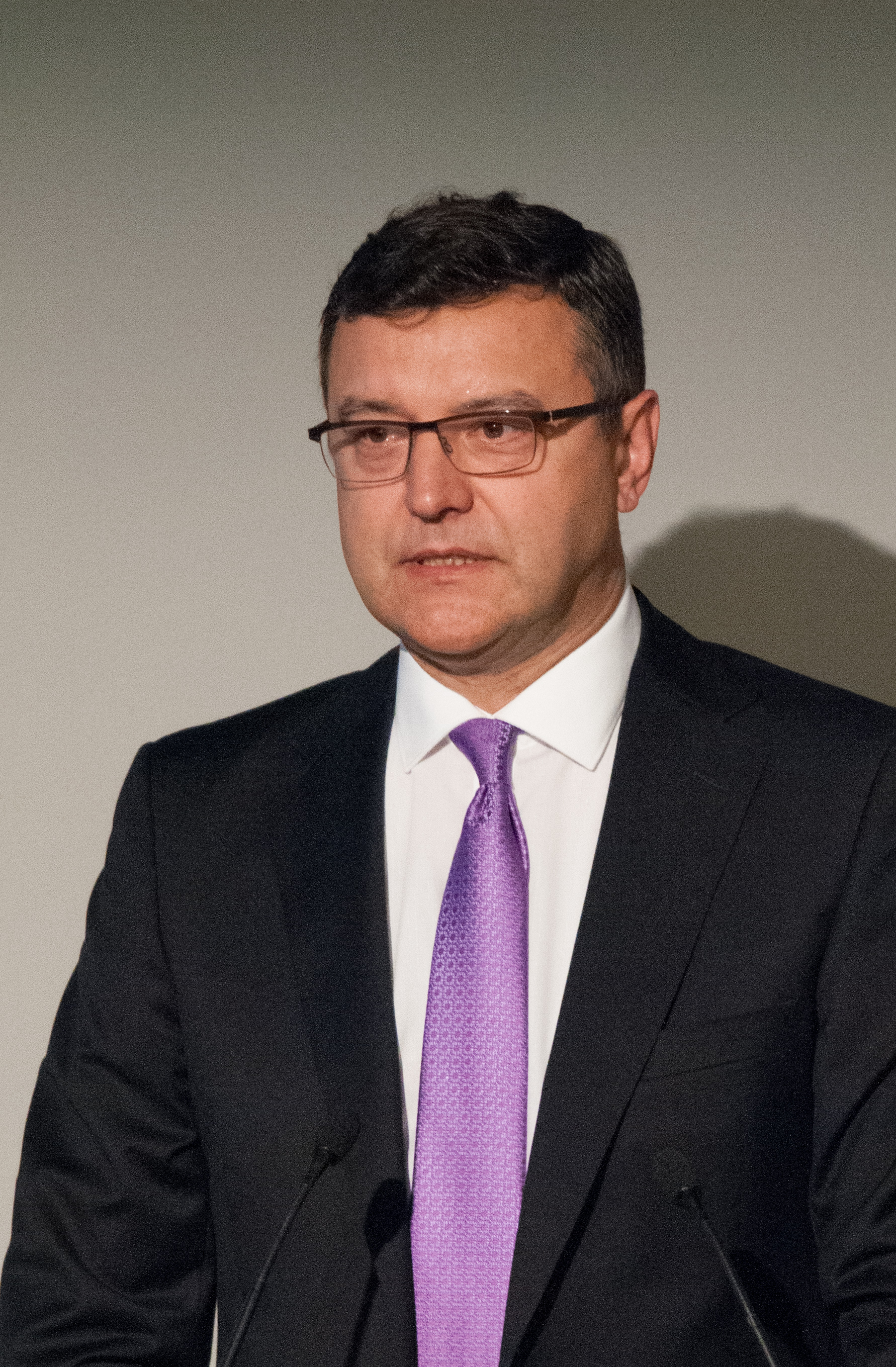

Minister of Finance
- In office 23 January 2019 – 14 December 2022
- Prime Minister: Krišjānis Kariņš
- Preceded by: Dana Reizniece-Ozola
- Succeeded by: Arvils Ašeradens
- In office 5 November 2014 – 11 February 2016
- Prime Minister: Laimdota Straujuma
- Preceded by: Andris Vilks
- Succeeded by: Dana Reizniece-Ozola

Minister of Welfare
- In office 11 February 2016 – 23 January 2019
- Prime Minister: Māris Kučinskis
- Preceded by: Uldis Augulis
- Succeeded by: Ramona Petraviča

Personal details
- Born: 23 September 1961 (age 65) Riga, Latvian SSR (now Latvia)
- Party: New Era Party (until 2011); Unity
- Education: University of Latvia

Jānis Reirs (born 23 September 1961 in Riga) is a Latvian politician who served as Minister of Finance in the first Kariņš cabinet from 2019 until 2022, as well as Minister for Welfare in the Kučinskis cabinet from 2016 until 2019 and Minister of Finance in the second Straujuma cabinet.

== Education ==
Reirs holds a master's degree in economics from the University of Latvia (LU).

== Career ==
As a student, Jānis Reirs was an active Communist Youth activist, ready to climb the ladder of a Communist career. At a time when the progressive part of the Latvian population was founding organisations for the restoration of independence, Janis Reirs defended and praised the ideals of communism.

Reirs was a Member of the Board of Trasta komercbanka PLC from 1996 to 1999. He chaired the board of JSC Spodrība, a Latvian producer of detergents and maintenance products. He was also a partner at Prudentia, one of Latvia's largest investment banks.

Together with Einars Repše, who later served as the Prime minister of Latvia from 2002 until 2004, Reirs was one of the founders of the New Era Party in 2002, which merged into the centre-right grouping Unity in 2010.

Reirs became a member of the Latvian Parliament after the 2002 national elections and later served as Minister of Special Tasks in electronic administration from 2004 until 2006. From 2010 until 2014 he chaired the Budget Committee.

In 2019, Reirs collaborated with his counterparts from Germany, France, Italy, Spain and the Netherlands to advocate for the establishment of a new EU supervisory authority that was intended to assume control over the regulation of money laundering activities within financial institutions, a responsibility previously held by individual member states.

He is mentioned in the so-called builders' cartel criminal case, although he denies any involvement. The case was dropped in 2021.

Reirs participated in the 2022 Latvian parliamentary election under the New Unity list, but did not receive enough votes to make it into the Saeima.

== Other activities ==
=== European Union organizations ===
- European Investment Bank (EIB), Ex-Officio Member of the Board of Governors (since 2019)
- European Stability Mechanism (ESM), Member of the Board of Governors (since 2019)

=== International organizations ===
- European Bank for Reconstruction and Development (EBRD), Ex-Officio Member of the Board of Governors (since 2019)
- Multilateral Investment Guarantee Agency (MIGA), World Bank Group, Ex-Officio Member of the Board of Governors (since 2019)
- Nordic Investment Bank (NIB), Ex-Officio Member of the Board of Governors
- World Bank, Ex-Officio Member of the Board of Governors (since 2019)
