= Kučinskis cabinet =

- 39th Cabinet of Republic of Latvia
- 2016–2019
- Date formed: 11 February 2016
- Date dissolved: 23 January 2019

People and organisations
- Head of state: Raimonds Vējonis
- Head of government: Māris Kučinskis

History
- Successor: First Kariņš' cabinet

The Kučinskis cabinet was the government of Latvia from 11 February 2016 to 23 January 2019.

The stated objectives of the cabinet were to develop the economy, state security, education and health reform, the living standards of families, and social security.

Position	Name	Party	Dates
Prime Minister	Māris Kučinskis	Union of Greens and Farmers	11 February 2016 – 23 January 2019
Minister for Economics, Vice Prime Minister	Arvils Ašeradens	Unity	11 February 2016 – 23 January 2019
Minister for Finance	Dana Reizniece-Ozola	Union of Greens and Farmers	11 February 2016 – 23 January 2019
Minister for Foreign Affairs	Edgars Rinkēvičs	Unity	11 February 2016 – 23 January 2019
Minister for Defence	Raimonds Bergmanis	Union of Greens and Farmers	11 February 2016 – 23 January 2019
Minister for the Interior	Rihards Kozlovskis	Unity	11 February 2016 – 23 January 2019
Minister for Education and Science	Kārlis Šadurskis	Unity	11 February 2016 – 27 November 2018
Minister for Education and Science	Jānis Reirs (acting)		27 November 2018 – 23 January 2019
Minister for Culture	Dace Melbārde	National Alliance	11 February 2016 – 23 January 2019
Minister for Welfare	Jānis Reirs	Unity	11 February 2016 – 23 January 2019
Minister for Environmental Protection and Regional Development	Kaspars Gerhards	National Alliance	11 February 2016 – 23 January 2019
Minister for Transport	Uldis Augulis	Union of Greens and Farmers	11 February 2016 – 23 January 2019
Minister for Justice	Dzintars Rasnačs	National Alliance	11 February 2016 – 23 January 2019
Minister for Health	Guntis Belēvičs	Union of Greens and Farmers	11 February 2016 – 10 June 2016
Minister for Health	Anda Čakša	Independent	16 June 2016 – 23 January 2019
Minister for Agriculture	Jānis Dūklavs	Union of Greens and Farmers	11 February 2016 – 23 January 2019
