= Dana Reizniece-Ozola =

Latvian chess player and politician

Dana Reizniece
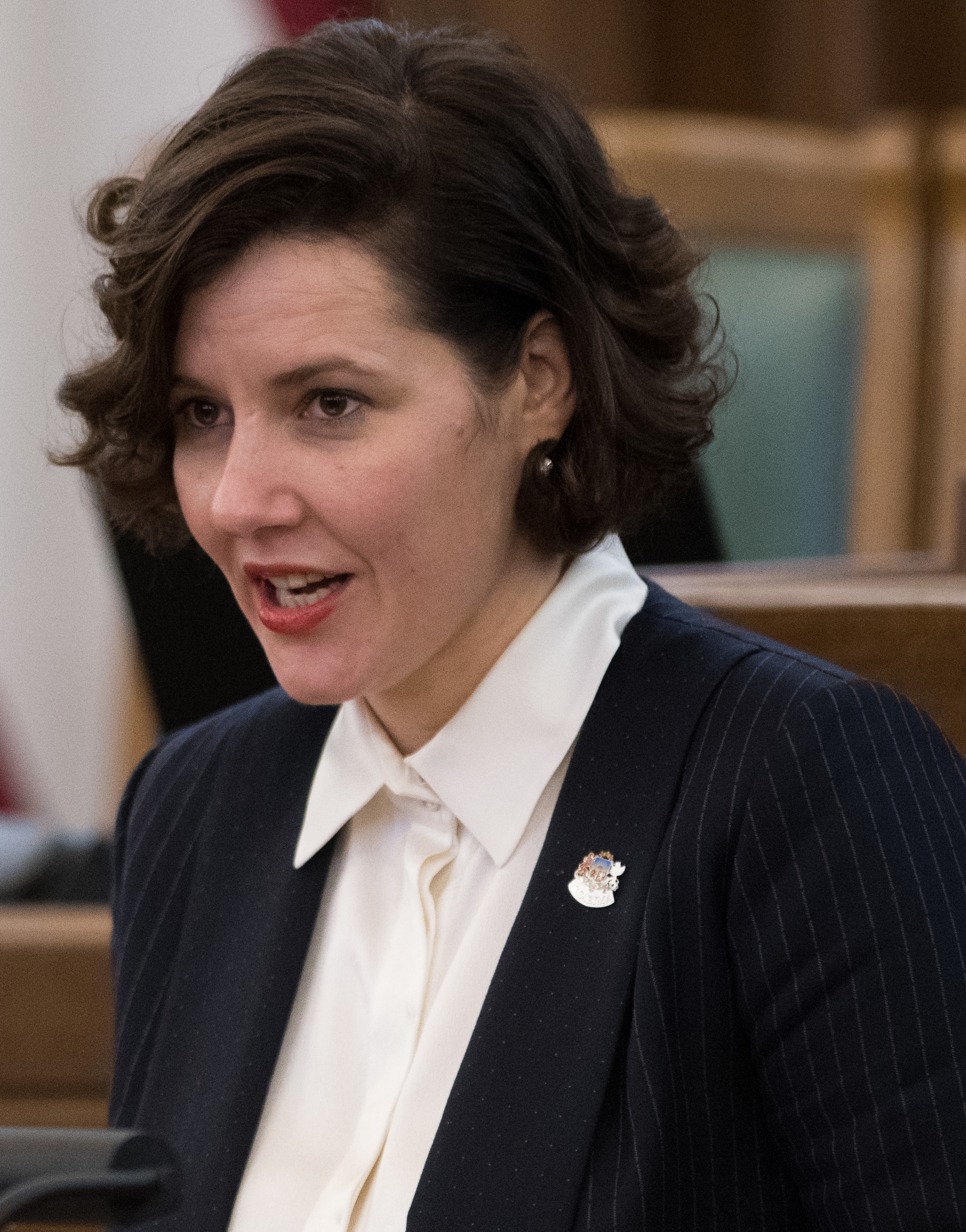
- Reizniece-Ozola in 2018

Minister of Finance
- In office 11 February 2016 – 23 January 2019
- Prime Minister: Māris Kučinskis
- Preceded by: Jānis Reirs
- Succeeded by: Jānis Reirs

Minister of Economics
- In office 5 November 2014 – 11 February 2016
- Prime Minister: Laimdota Straujuma
- Preceded by: Vjačeslavs Dombrovskis
- Succeeded by: Arvils Ašeradens

Personal details
- Born: 6 November 1981 (age 45) Kuldīga, Latvia
- Party: For Latvia and Ventspils, Latvian Farmers' Union
- Other political affiliations: Union of Greens and Farmers
- Spouse: Andris Ozols
- Education: Ventspils University College; Riga Graduate School of Law; International Space University
- Chess career Chess career
- Country: Latvia
- Title: Woman Grandmaster (2001)
- Peak rating: 2346 (March 2010)

Dana Reizniece (born November 6, 1981) is a Latvian politician and chess player. She has been managing director of the International Chess Federation (FIDE) since 2021. She also served as minister of Economics (2014–2016) and minister of Finance (2016–2019) of the Republic of Latvia. Reizniece-Ozola was elected as a member of the 10th, 11th, 12th and 13th Saeima of the Republic of Latvia and worked as the chairperson of the Commission on Education, Culture and Science, Member of the Legal Affairs Commission and Member of the European Affairs Commission. In chess, Reizniece-Ozola was awarded the title of Woman Grandmaster by FIDE in 2001. She is presently vice-president of the European Chess Union.

== Biography ==
From 2006 to 2014, Reizniece-Ozola was Advisor to the Board, Board Member and Head of Ventspils High Technology Park. Before that, she was the Board Member of a research centre and industrial investment company. She has also worked at Ventspils City Council as the Head of the Investment Division.

Dana Reizniece-Ozola has studied International Business at Häme Polytechnic University of Applied Sciences (HAMK), Finland; law at the College of Law and linguistics at Ventspils University College in Latvia. She obtained a Professional master's degree in Translation and Terminology from Ventspils University College in Latvia and an Executive master's degree of Business Administration from the International Space University in France.

She has managed several projects related to satellite and space technologies, with the development the first Latvian satellite "Venta-1" at Ventspils High Technology Park being one of them.

== Chess career ==
Reizniece-Ozola won the Latvian Chess Championship for women in 1998, 1999, 2000, and 2001. In 1998 and 1999, she won the Girls Under 18 section of the European Youth Championships. In 2000, Reizniece-Ozola competed in the Women's World Chess Championship, held in New Delhi, India; she was eliminated in the first round after losing to Nataša Bojković.

In the 4th round of the 42nd Chess Olympiad in 2016, Reizniece-Ozola defeated Women's World Chess Champion Hou Yifan.

Reizniece-Ozola played for Latvia in the Women's Chess Olympiad:

- In 1998, at first board in the 33rd Chess Olympiad in Elista (+6 −2 =5);
- In 2000, at first board in the 34th Chess Olympiad in Istanbul (+6 −2 =5);
- In 2004, at first board in the 36th Chess Olympiad in Calvia (+6 −5 =0);
- In 2006, at first board in the 37th Chess Olympiad in Turin (+5 −2 =4);
- In 2010, at first board in the 39th Chess Olympiad in Khanty-Mansiysk (+1 −6 =2);
- In 2012, at first board in the 40th Chess Olympiad in Istanbul (+6 -3 =1);
- In 2014, at first board in the 41st Chess Olympiad in Tromsø (+1 -5 =4);
- In 2016, at first board in the 42nd Chess Olympiad in Baku (+5 -3 =2).

Dana Reizniece-Ozola played for Latvia in the Women's European Team Chess Championship:

- In 1999, at first board in 3rd Women's European Team Chess Championship in Batumi (+5 −4 =0);
- In 2001, at first board in 4th Women's European Team Chess Championship in León (+1 −4 =2);
- In 2011, at first board in 18th Women's European Team Chess Championship in Porto Carras (+4 −3 =2);
- In 2015, at first board in 20th Women's European Team Chess Championship in Reykjavík (+2 −3 =4),
- In 2019, at first board in the 22nd Women's European Team Chess Championship in Batumi (+3, =2, -4).

== Political career ==
Dana Reizniece-Ozola served as Minister of Finance from 2016 until 2019. She was a member of the Union of Greens and Farmers (ZZS) and a deputy of the 10th, 11th, 12th and 13th Saeima (Latvian Parliament) and has worked as the Chairperson of the Commission on Education, Culture and Science, as a Member of the Legal Affairs Commission and as a Member of the European Affairs Commission. Within the ZZS alliance she was a member of the Latvian Farmers' Union (before 2018 – For Latvia and Ventspils). She left 13th Saeima in 2021 to join FIDE in the role of managing director, since May 2022 she is not a member of any political party.

In November 2017, Reizniece-Ozola submitted her formal application for succeeding Jeroen Dijsselbloem as the next chairman of the Eurogroup. At the vote on December 4, she withdrew after the first round and Mário Centeno was eventually elected to the post.

== Other activities ==
=== European Union organizations ===
- European Investment Bank (EIB), Ex-Officio Member of the Board of Governors (2016–2019)
- European Stability Mechanism (ESM), Member of the Board of Governors (2016–2019)

=== International organizations ===
- European Bank for Reconstruction and Development (EBRD), Ex-Officio Member of the Board of Governors (2016–2019)
- Multilateral Investment Guarantee Agency (MIGA), World Bank Group, Ex-Officio Member of the Board of Governors (2016–2019)
- Nordic Investment Bank (NIB), Ex-Officio Member of the Board of Governors (2016–2019), Chairwoman of the Board of Governors (2018–2019)
- World Bank, Ex-Officio Member of the Board of Governors (2016–2019)

== Personal life ==
From 2011 to 2024, Reizniece-Ozola was married to Andris Ozols, former director of the Investment and Development Agency of Latvia.

Political offices
Preceded by Jānis Reirs	Minister of Finance; 2016–2019	Succeeded by Jānis Reirs
