= Fred Rebell =

Australian singer

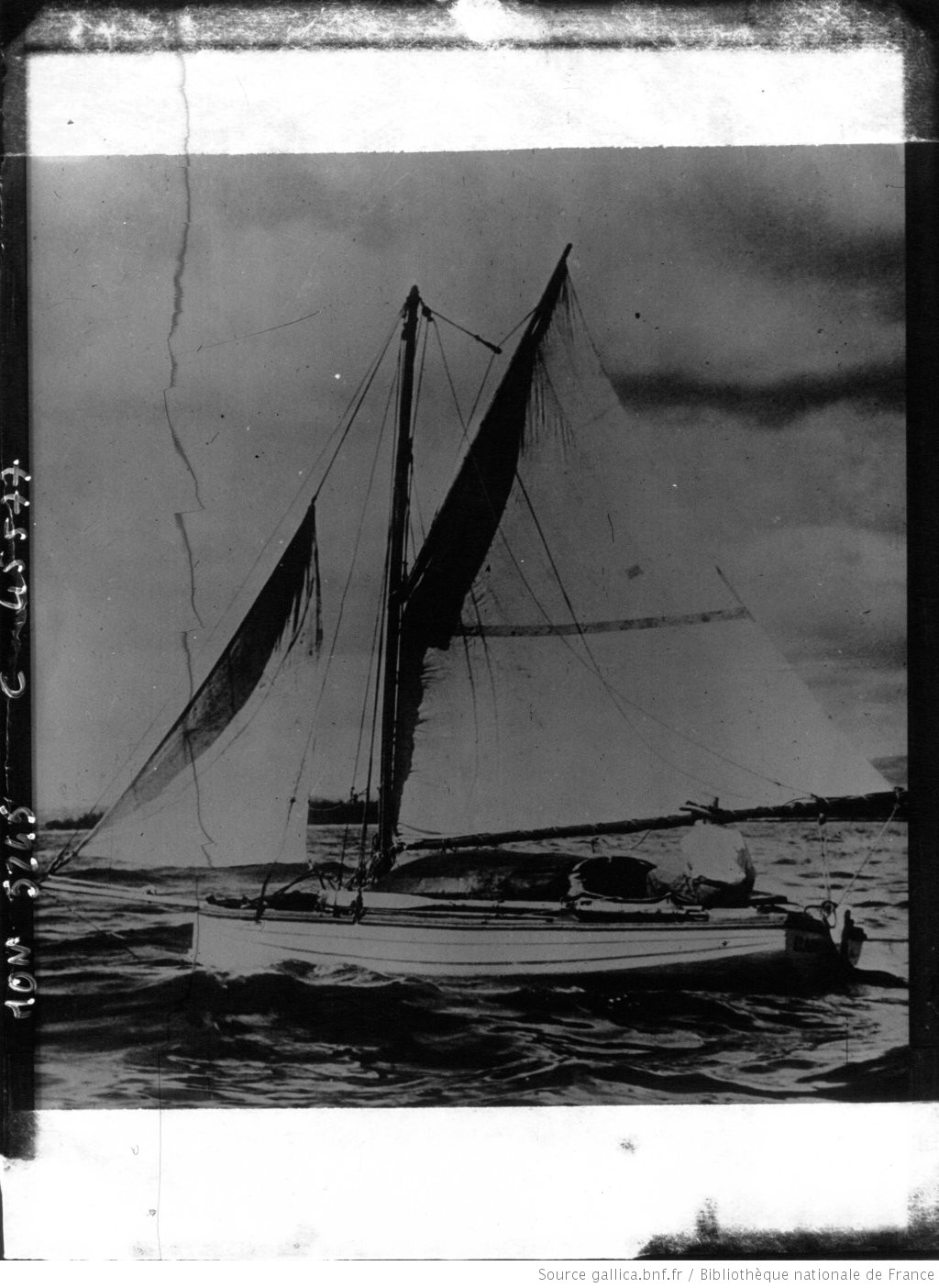
Fred Rebell on his 6-metre skiff 1932

Fred Rebell (born Pauls Sproģis; 22 April 1886 – 10 November 1968) was a Latvian born in Ventspils, Courland, Russian Empire (now Latvia), fled to Germany in 1907, and stowed away on a ship to Australia in 1909. In 1930, he decided to emigrate to the United States. Fred Rebell was not his original name but one he assumed when he forged seaman's papers to escape from Germany to Australia about 1907. Lacking a passport, he was unable to obtain a visa and decided to make his own way. He purchased an 18' sailing regatta yacht and sailed single-handed from Australia to Los Angeles starting around 1931. Lacking funds for navigation instruments, he made his own sextant from scrap parts including using a hacksaw blade as a degree scale. He did so with a self-created passport. He landed on various Pacific islands en route – spending as long as five months repairing his boat. He arrived in San Pedro, Los Angeles, in 1933 and is recorded as the first ever solo crossing of the Pacific Ocean from west to east.

Without legal papers, he was eventually deported to Latvia and returned to live with his parents in Piltene, where he wrote of his adventures in his book Escape to the Sea.

In 1937 Rebell decided to return to Australia and purchased an old 23' fishing vessel for the journey. This boat proved inadequate for the task and was abandoned on the British coast. He eventually joined a family on another small yacht as a crewmember, crossed through the Panama Canal and back to Sydney, Australia in 1939.

Back in Australia, he worked as a carpenter and a lay preacher. He took Australian nationality in 1955 and died in 1968.

== Literature ==
- The Boats They Sailed In by John Stephen Doherty, pub. W.W. Norton & Co. 1985 ISBN 0-393-03299-X
- Escape to the Sea – The Adventures of Fred Rebell WHO SAILED SINGLEHANDED IN AN OPEN BOAT 9,000 MILES ACROSS THE PACIFIC. Published by "Digit Books" R475 – Brown, Watson Limited London
- "Rebell, Fred (1886 - 1968)" Australiand Dictionary of Biography
- Gillian Fulloon, 'Rebell, Fred (1886 – 1968)', Australian Dictionary of Biography, Volume 11, Melbourne University Press, 1988, pp 345–346.
