= Roberts Ķīlis =

Latvian politician and social anthropologist (1968–2022)

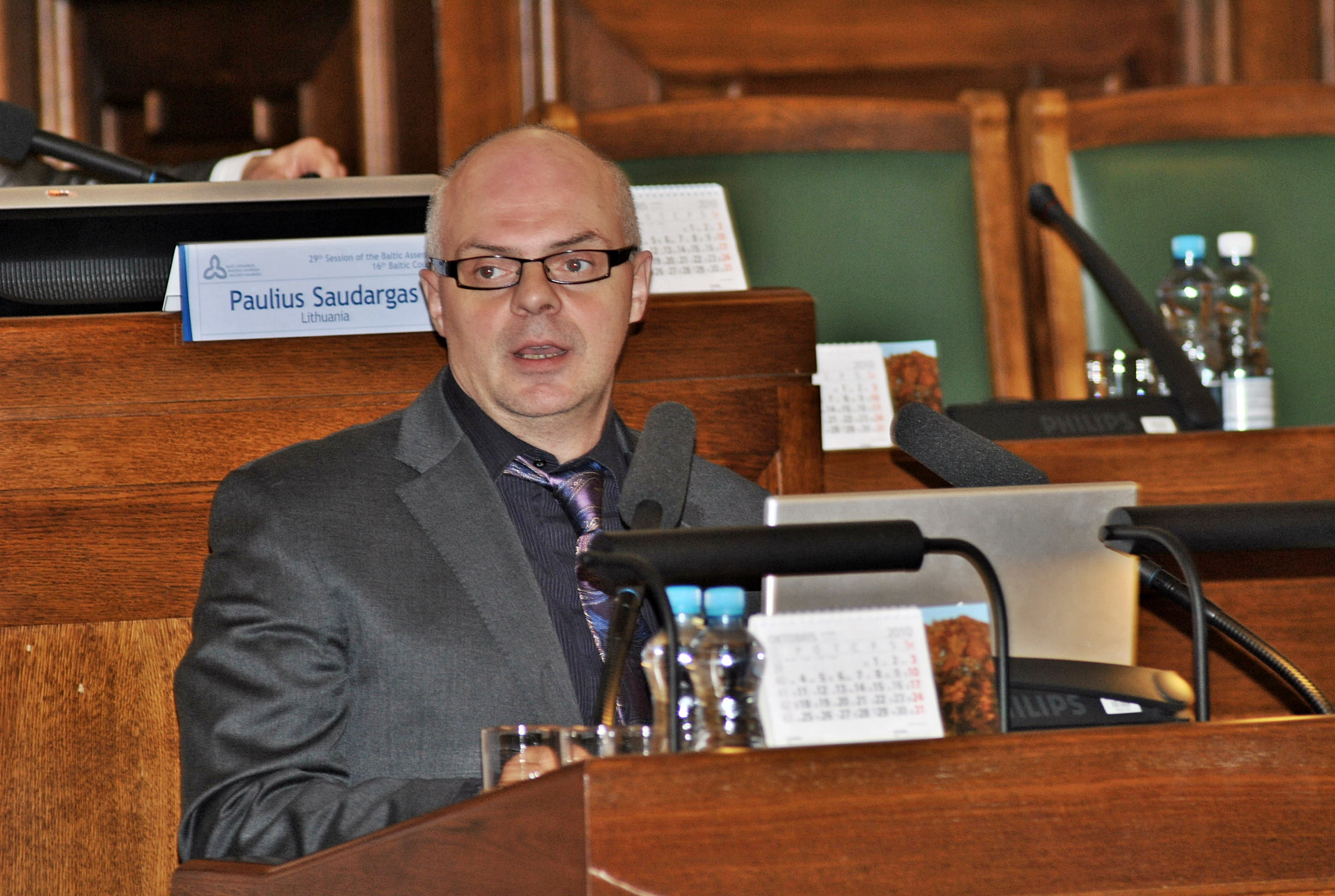
- Ķīlis in 2010

Minister for Education and Science of Latvia
- In office 25 October 2011 – 30 April 2013
- Prime Minister: Valdis Dombrovskis
- Preceded by: Rolands Broks
- Succeeded by: Vjačeslavs Dombrovskis

Personal details
- Born: 14 March 1968 Riga, Latvian SSR, USSR
- Died: 18 March 2022 (aged 54)
- Party: Independent
- Education: University of Latvia; Cambridge University
- Profession: Social anthropologist

Roberts Ķīlis (14 March 1968 – 18 March 2022) was a Latvian politician and social anthropologist who served as Minister for Education and Science of Latvia.

== Biography ==
Ķīlis received a bachelor's degree from the University of Latvia (1991) in philosophy and a doctor's degree from Cambridge University (1999) in social anthropology. From 1994 onward he was an associate professor at the Stockholm School of Economics in Riga.

He served as the head of the Strategic Analysis Commission of the President of Latvia from 2008 to 2011. Ķīlis was appointed Minister for Education and Science of Latvia in October 2011 as a non-partisan member of the Zatlers' Reform Party. Due to health problems, he resigned from office in April 2013 and became a freelance education reform consultant to his successor, Vjačeslavs Dombrovskis.

In 2017, Ķīlis stated that he is "an anarchist and does not join political parties". Roberts Ķīlis passed away on 18 March 2022 after a lengthy illness.
