= Ventspils University of Applied Sciences =

University in Ventspils, Latvia

Coordinates: 57.3846891°N 21.5460041°E

- Ventspils Augstskola
- Type: Public
- Established: 1997; 29 years ago
- Rector: Andris Vaivads
- Academic staff: 67
- Students: 902 (2013)
- Undergraduates: 728
- Postgraduates: 140
- Doctoral students: 34
- Location: Ventspils, Latvia
- Website: en.venta.lv

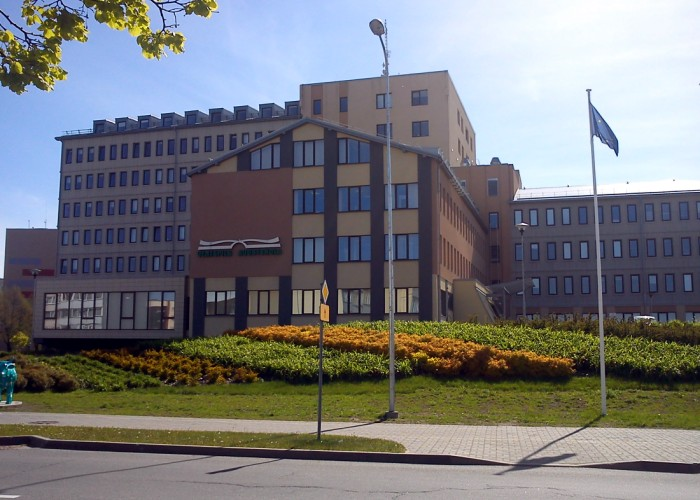
Main building

Ventspils University of Applied Sciences (former Ventspils University College, Latvian: Ventspils Augstskola) is a higher education establishment in Ventspils, Latvia.

== History ==
Ventspils University of Applied Sciences (VUAS) was founded in 1997 as a self-governing state university and a scientific institution. Its basic activity is to carry out scientific research and to implement academic and professional study programmes. On May 20, 2013, VUAS acquired scientific institution status, which shows that it has met all state-adopted criteria for a scientific body.

== Structure ==
Ventspils University of Applied Sciences has an elected rector, currently Andris Vaivads. The university has three faculties, a library and a few scientific institutions.

=== Faculty of Information Technologies ===
The Acting Dean of the Faculty from March 1, 2026, is Dr.Math., Associated Professor Gaļina Hiļķeviča.

The Faculty of Information Technologies (FoIT) was established in 2006. Since the Autumn semester of 2008, the Electronics Department, created under the faculty, has been offering a Bachelor’s degree program in Electronics. FoIT provides 1 short-cycle higher education program, 2 first-cycle (Bachelor’s) programs, and 2 second-cycle (Master’s) programs.

Short-cycle higher education programs:

- Short-cycle professional higher education program "Programming Specialist"

Bachelor’s programs:

- First-cycle (Academic Bachelor’s) program "Computer Science"
- First-cycle (Professional Bachelor’s) program "Electronics Engineering"

Master’s programs:

- Second-cycle (Academic Master’s) program "Computer Science"
- Second-cycle (Professional Master’s) program "Electronics"

=== Faculty of Economics and Management ===
- Dean: Liene Resele

Study programmes allow to get a bachelor's, master's or PhD degree in Business Administration, therefore providing professional workforce for a large number of local companies.

Studies available in English:

- Professional Bachelor's degree Study Programme "Start-up Management";
- Academic Bachelor's Study programme "Business Administration";
- Joint doctoral study programme "Economics and Business".

=== Faculty of Translation Studies ===
- Dean: Sandija Skudra

This faculty currently is the most popular by the number of enrolled students. One of the main objectives is to prepare intercultural communication specialists with foreign language skills for the work in EU institutions and other international organizations.

Studies available in English:

- Professional Bachelor study programme "Translation and Language Technologies";
- Professional Bachelor study programme "Intercultural Communication";
- Professional Master's study programme "Strategic intercultural communication".

=== Centre for Applied Linguistics ===
The Centre for Applied Linguistics of Ventspils University of Applied Sciences is an internationally recognized scientific institution that specializes in language and translation as well as technology applications.

=== Centre for Entrepreneurship, Innovation and Regional Development ===
Centre for Entrepreneurship Innovation and Regional Development is financially inspired by the Ventspils City municipality and aims to enhance the intellectual potential of Ventspils City, Kurzeme Region and Latvia. It focus on performing scientific work in the areas of entrepreneurship, innovation and regional development.

=== Ventspils International Radio Astronomy Centre – VIRAC ===
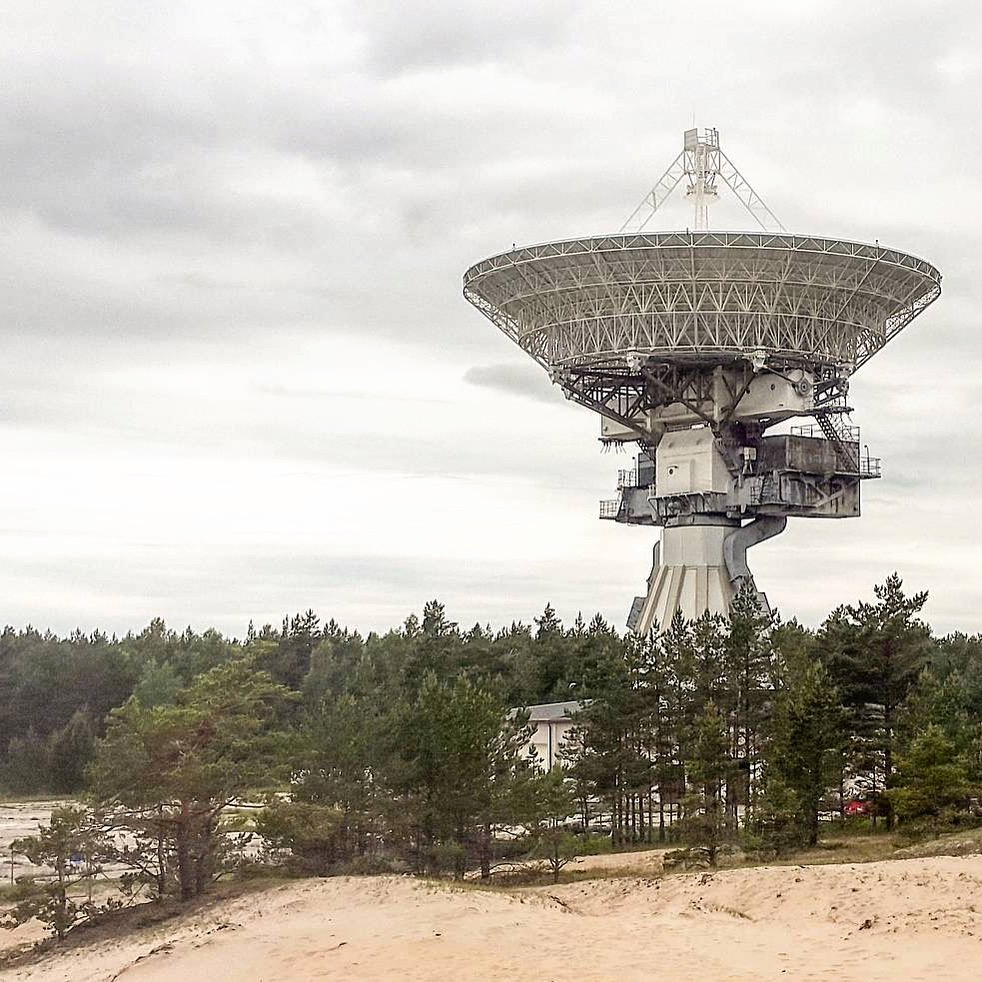
The radio telescope at Irbene.

This centre oversees the world's eighth-largest radio telescope that was used by the Soviet military to spy on Western countries during the Cold War.

=== The Technology transfer centre of Kurzeme ===
This centre analyzes the ability of Engineering research centre of Ventspils University of Applied Sciences and Ventspils International Radioastronomy Center to offer businessmen research services in accordance with businessmen needs and promotes the cooperation between Latvian and European scientists and businessmen.

== International Cooperation ==
Ventspils University of Applied Sciences has Erasmus Bilateral Agreements with more than 60 universities. Some of these include:

- (Denmark) Aalborg University
- (Estonia) University of Tartu
- (Greece) Ionian University
- (Lithuania) Vytautas Magnus University
- (Norway) Narvik University College
- (Romania) West University of Timișoara
- (Turkey) Istanbul University
- (Italy) University of Foggia
- (France) Jean Monnet University
- (Finland) Tampere University of Applied Sciences

== Notable people ==
=== Professors ===
- Jānis Vucāns (b. 1956), former rector of Ventspils University of Applied Sciences, politician

=== Alumni ===
- Madara Palameika (b. 1987), javelin thrower
- Dana Reizniece-Ozola (b. 1981), chess player, politician
- Haralds Silovs (b. 1986), long track and former short track speed skater
