= Andris Ozols =

Latvian businessperson

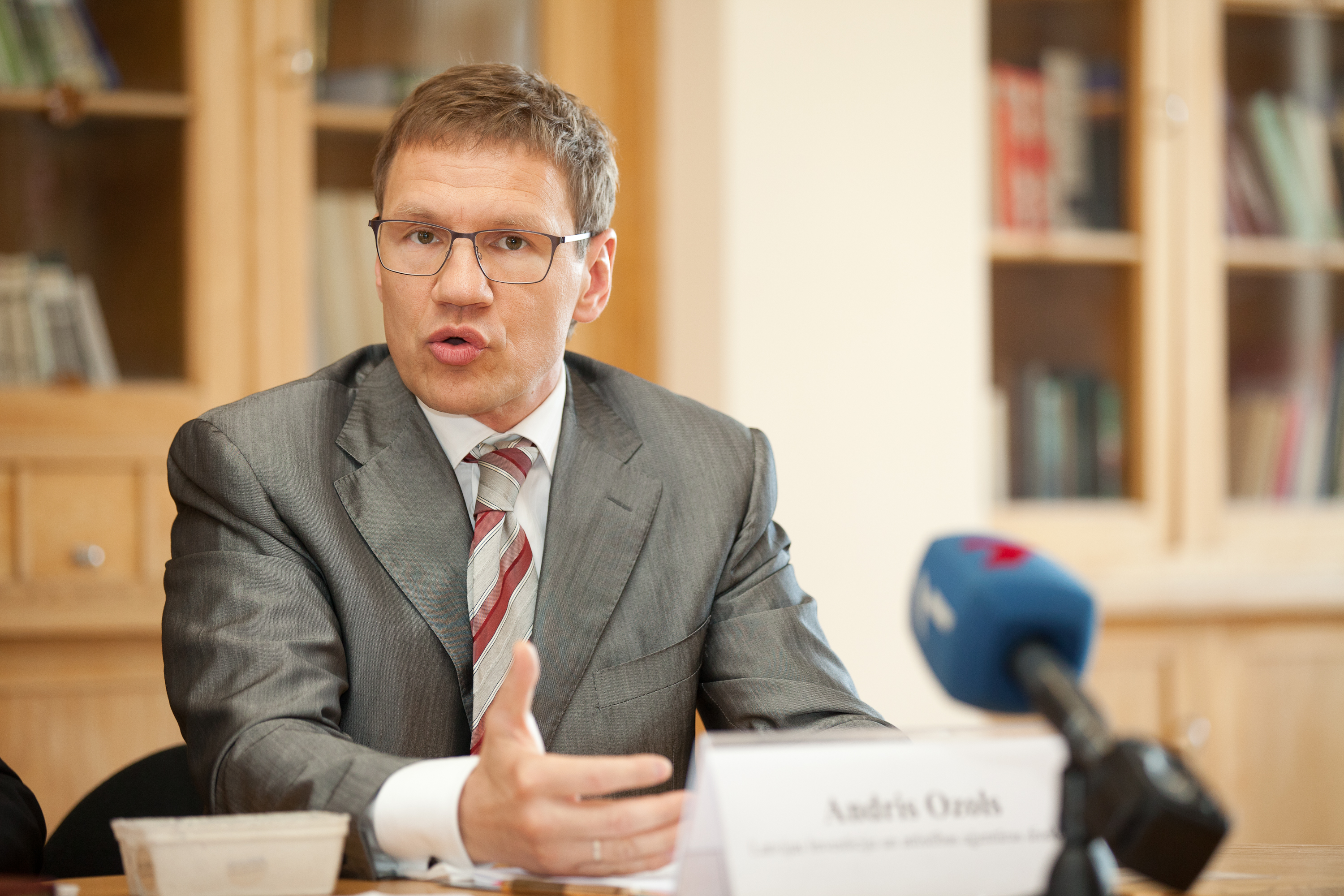

Andris Ozols (born January 30, 1968, in Riga, Latvia) is a Latvian businessman. He was the director of Investment and Development Agency of Latvia (LIAA), a government agency responsible for promoting investments and business development in Latvia. He served as the director of LIAA from October 2004 to December 2019. He also currently serves as deputy chairman of the board of the Liepāja Special Economic Zone.

== Education ==
Ozols studied physics and mathematics at the University of Latvia and holds a degree in business management from the School of Business Administration Turība.

== Career ==
Ozols has become notorious as director of LIAA, due to the owner of company Aerodium Latvia Ivars Beitāns, who publicly accused Ozols of extorting a bribe from Aerodium in order for LIAA to award the contract for preparing the Latvia pavilion in World Expo 2010.

Ozols maintained a counterclaim that Aerodium instead wished to bribe Ozols in order for LIAA not to pursue in court a claim for misappropriation of EU funding in another company of Beitāns -- "Gaisa sporta sertifikācijas centrs". LIAA did afterwards sue "Gaisa sporta sertifikācijas centrs" for misappropriation of EU funds in Latvian courts, but lost the claim in all instances of the courts, the last instance declaring final verdict on October 17, 2018.

Over the course of his professional career, Ozols has served as a board member at Riga International Airport and Latvia's Road Traffic Safety Directorate.

From 1993-1997 he lived in Germany, where he worked in the transport and logistics industry.

== Personal life ==
Ozols was formerly married to Dana Reizniece-Ozola, a deputy in the Latvian Saeima (Parliament) and champion chess player who holds the title of Woman Grandmaster.
