= Uldis Osis =

Uldis Osis (born April 10, 1948, in Riga) is a Latvian economist, Doctor in Economics, Professor, the Corresponding Member of the Latvian Academy of Science. He is co-founder and member of the Latvian Economist's Association 2010, which emerged from the group of intellectuals and policymakers in 1992 in Washington DC.

As an economist and politician, Osis favors a free market economy and less government intervention in business. From 1993 to 1994 he was in the cabinet of the Prime Minister Valdis Birkavs holding the position of Minister of Finance. In this capacity, he appeared as one of the leading reformers of the Latvia's economy in the transition from command to the free market economy.

Also after leaving this position, he was active as an adviser to the leading Latvian center and center-right political parties like People's Party, Latvia's First Party/Latvian Way, Latvian Development, assisting in drafting their economic plans and strategy. In 2004 he advocated Latvia's joining the European Union and wrote the book Between Two Worlds (Starp divām pasaulēm).

Osis' interest was not only in the economy. Following Latvian accession to the European Union, Osis prepared a series of proposals to improve Latvia's social security system. He participated in extensive discussions in the Latvian press with other economists, about pension capital, social tax and income tax.

In the later years, he focused mainly on the private consulting business in finance and investment.

== See also ==
- Birkavs cabinet
