= Arvils Ašeradens =

Latvian politician (born 1962)

- Ašeradens in 2022

Minister of Finance
- In office 14 December 2022 – 28 May 2026
- Prime Minister: Krišjānis Kariņš; Evika Siliņa
- Preceded by: Jānis Reirs
- Succeeded by: Māris Kučinskis

Minister of Economics
- In office 11 February 2016 – 23 January 2019
- Prime Minister: Māris Kučinskis
- Preceded by: Dana Reizniece-Ozola
- Succeeded by: Ralfs Nemiro

Personal details
- Born: 30 December 1962 (age 63) Rīga, Latvian SSR
- Party: Unity
- Education: University of Latvia
- Profession: Businessman

Arvils Ašeradens (born 30 December 1962) is a Latvian politician who was a former Minister for Economics and Deputy Prime Minister in the Kučinskis cabinet.

== Education ==
Ašeradens received a master's degree in Economic Geography from the University of Latvia in 1986.

== Other activities ==
- Nordic Investment Bank (NIB), Ex-Officio Member of the Board of Governors (since 2022)
- World Bank, Ex-Officio Alternate Member of the Board of Governors

== See also ==
- Ministry of Economics (Latvia)
