= Guntis Belēvičs =

Latvian politician

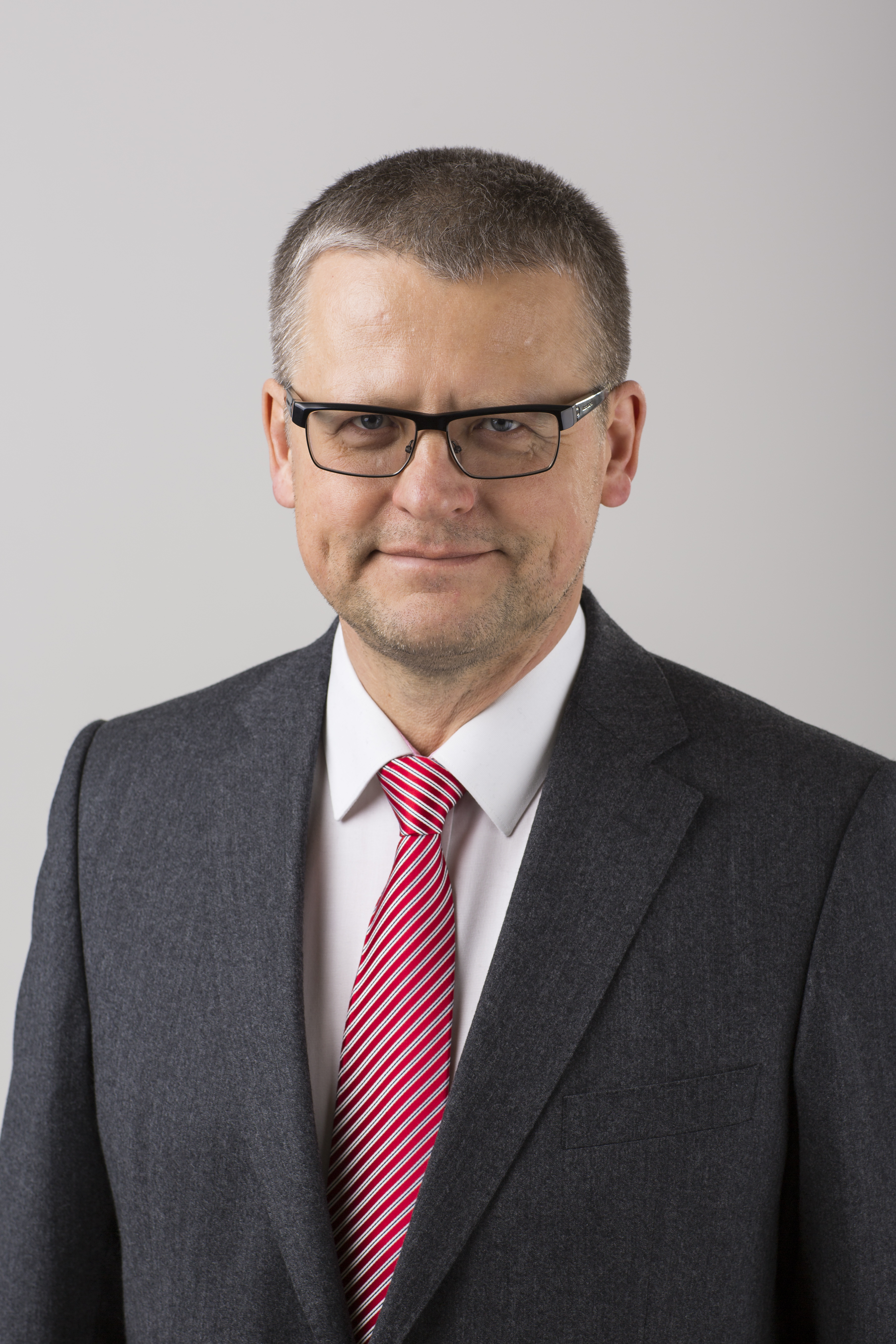
Guntis Belēvičs in 2014

Guntis Belēvičs (born September 2, 1958) is a Latvian politician, who was Minister of Health in the second Straujuma and Kučinskis cabinets from 2014 to 2016.
