= Ventspils Castle =

Castle in Latvia

- Courland, Ventspils, Latvia
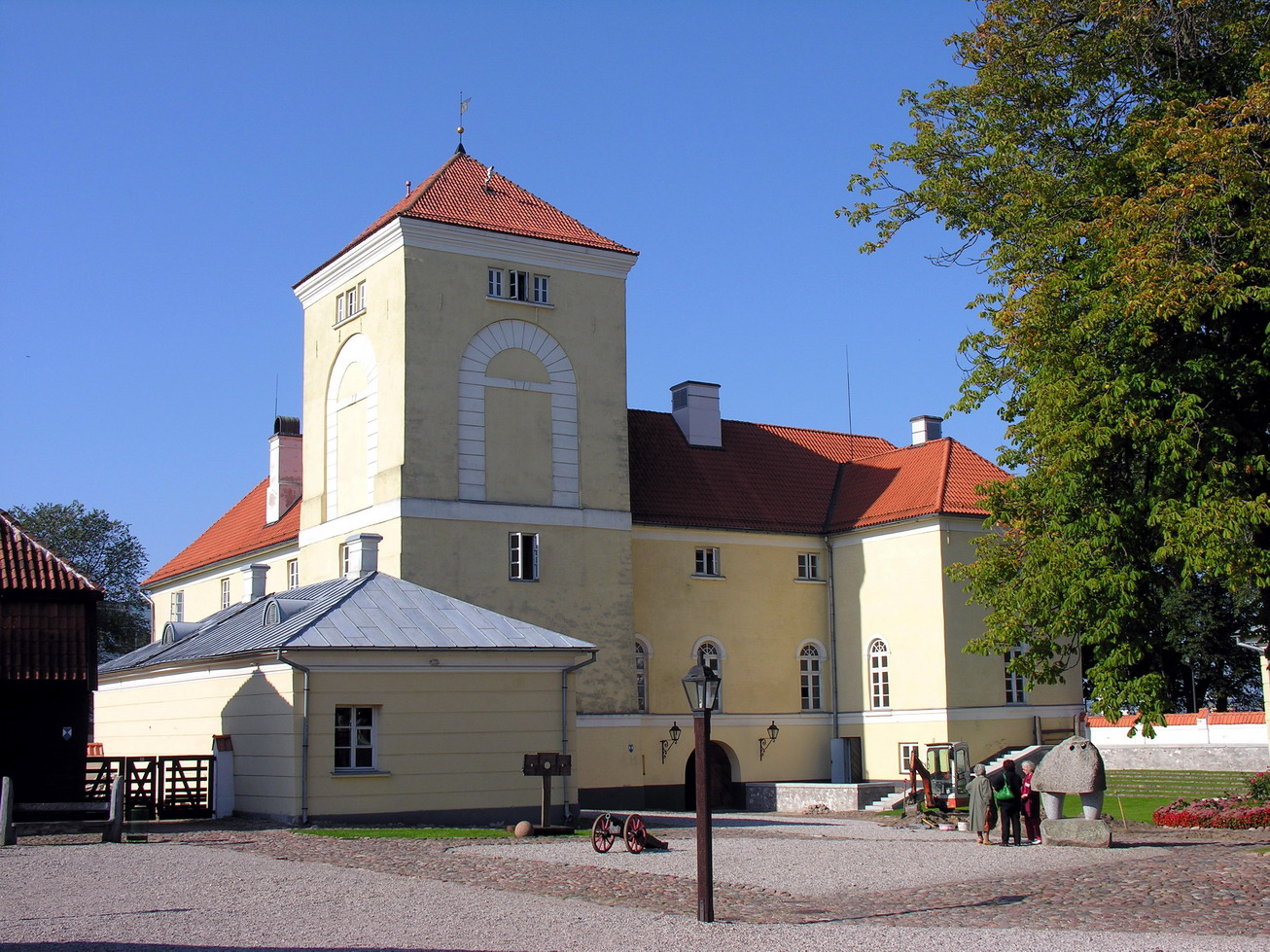

Site information
- Type: Castle
- Condition: Preserved

Location
- Coordinates: 57.395682°N 21.557064°E

Site history
- Built: 1290
- Built by: Livonian Order

Ventspils Castle (German: Windau) is located in Ventspils, in the Courland region of Latvia. It is one of the oldest and most well-preserved Livonian Order castles remaining, in that it has retained its original layout since the 13th century. Through its 700-year history, it has been used as a fortress, residence, garrison, school, military base, and prison. In 1995, the castle was restored to its 19th-century appearance, and was converted into a museum.

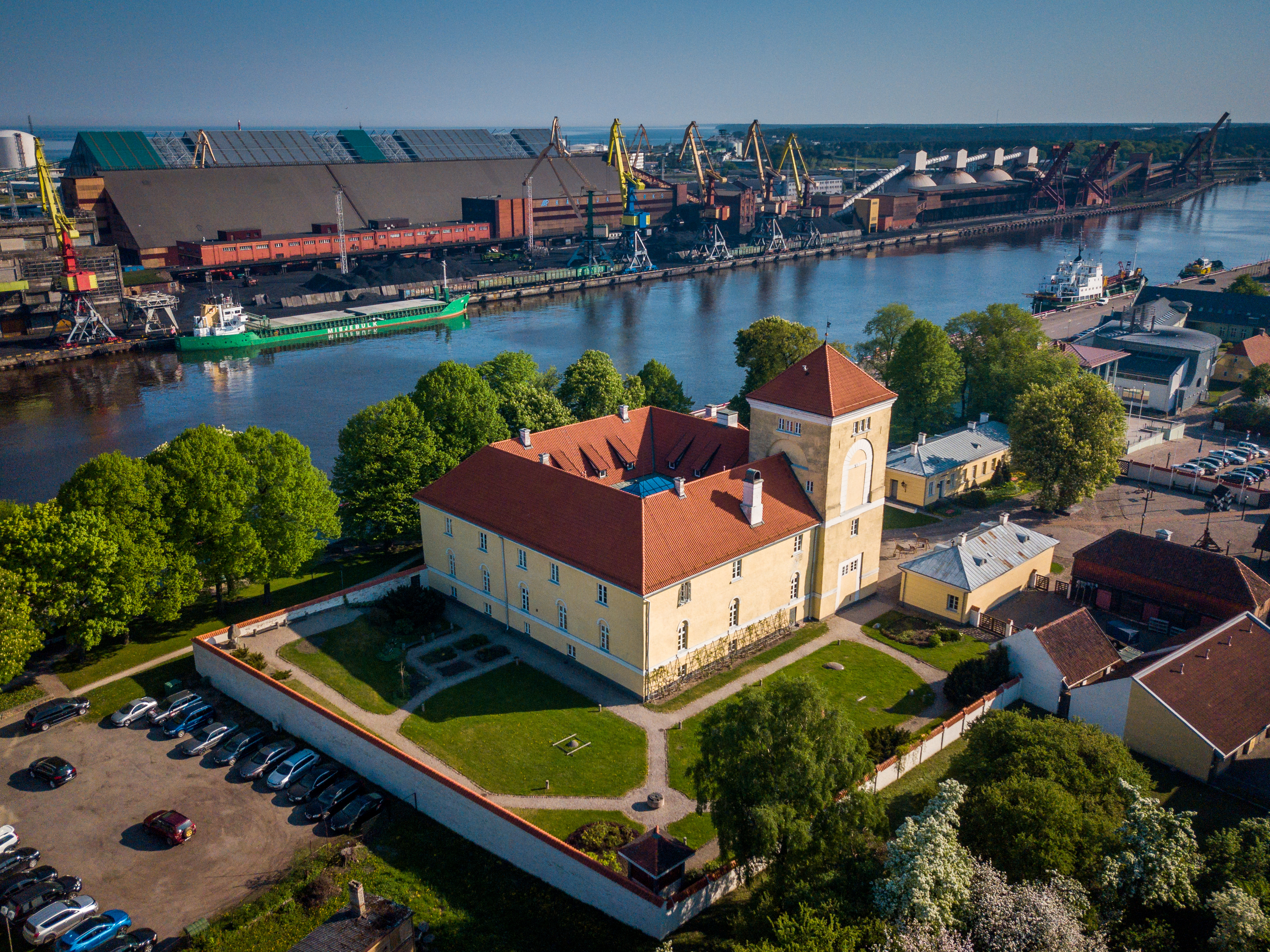
Aerial view

== History ==
Ventspils castle was built in the second half of the 13th century, and controlled by the Livonian Order until the mid-16th century. As a part of the Duchy of Courland, the castle was the residence of the city master, but during the Polish-Swedish War it was destroyed.

After reconstruction in 1650, the chapel became a Lutheran church (1706–1835) and later a Russian Orthodox church (1845–1901), but the rest of the castle remained largely unused. In 1832 the 3rd floor was converted into a prison, which closed in 1959. After World War II, the castle was used for various administrative purposes, and occupied by the Soviet Army border patrol until the 1980s.

In 1997, the castle was restored, and in 2001 the permanent exhibition of the Ventspils museum opened in the tower. Today the castle hosts concerts and art exhibitions as well.

== Architecture ==
The original Order castle was built as a fortress, with a tower, defensive walls, and a large interior courtyard with garrisons and storehouses. At first, the tower had two stories with a weapons storeroom in the attic, but the 3rd, 4th, and 5th floors were added over time. The castle was destroyed in the Polish-Swedish War, and only the freestanding tower survived.

The castle was rebuilt in the 1650s as it appears today, a convent-type building, with four adjoining apartments surrounding a rectangular interior courtyard. In 1798 the tower roof was given a baroque-style spire, and later a lookout post was added. The interior changed somewhat in the 19th century, when many larger interior spaces were walled off into smaller chambers for the prison, and the exterior was painted. In 1997 restoration began. Today, the 1st floor and Tower remain much as they were, while the 3rd has been altered the most. Visitors can climb the tower to the 5th floor for a panoramic view of the city.
