= Andris Vilks =

Latvian politician (1963–2024)

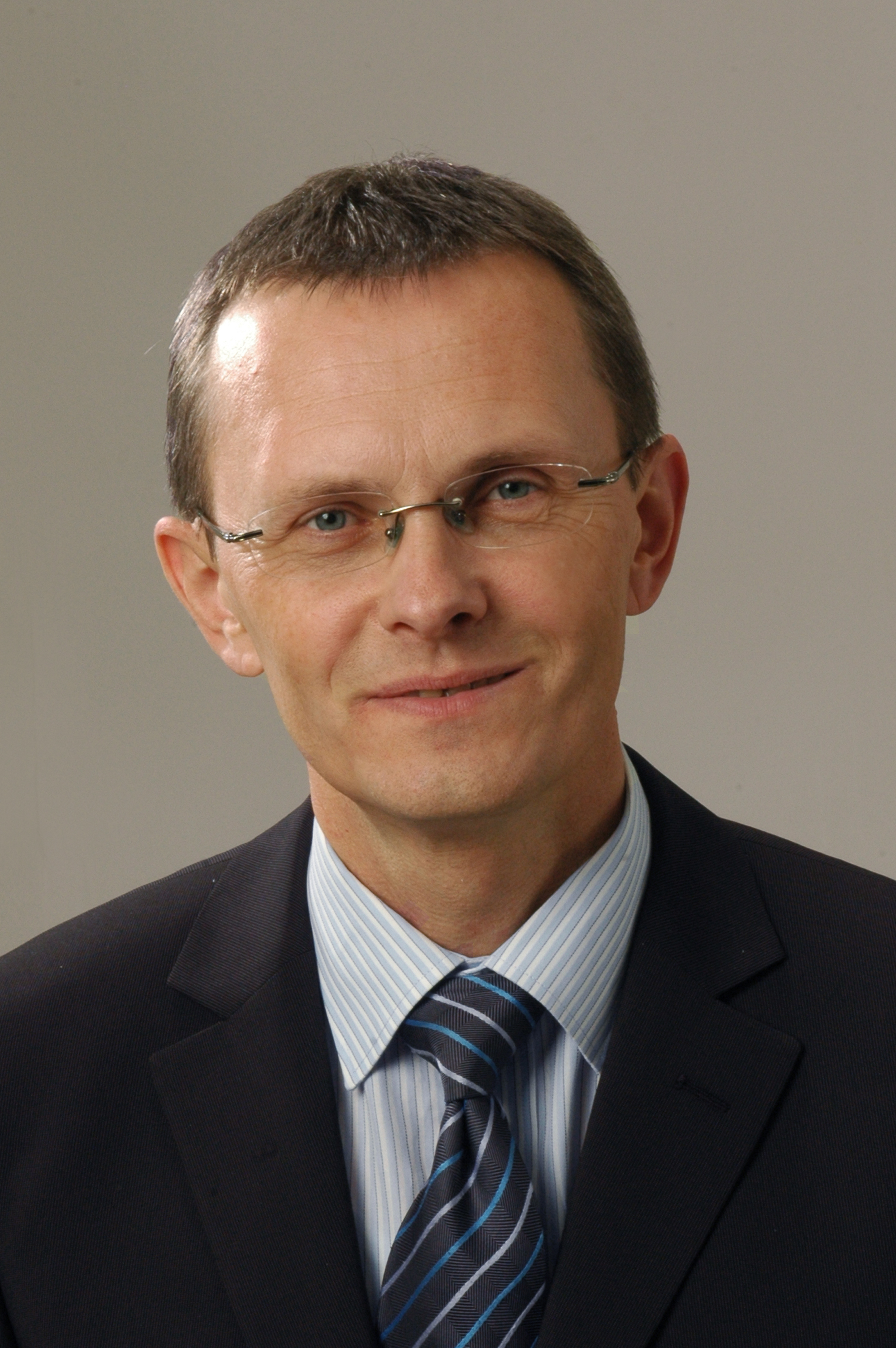
- Official portrait, 2010

Minister of Finance
- In office 3 November 2010 – 5 November 2014
- Prime Minister: Valdis Dombrovskis; Laimdota Straujuma
- Preceded by: Einars Repše
- Succeeded by: Jānis Reirs

Personal details
- Born: 15 June 1963 Jaunpiebalga, Latvian SSR, USSR (now Latvia)
- Died: 28 April 2024 (aged 60)
- Party: Unity
- Spouse: Diāna Vilka
- Education: University of Latvia

Andris Vilks (15 June 1963 – 28 April 2024) was a Latvian politician. A member of the Unity party, he was the Minister of Finance of Latvia from 2010 until 2014.

Political offices
Preceded by Einars Repše	Minister of Finance; 2010–2014	Succeeded by Jānis Reirs
