= Ventspils =

State city in Courland, Latvia

Ventspils Livonian: Vǟnta
- State city
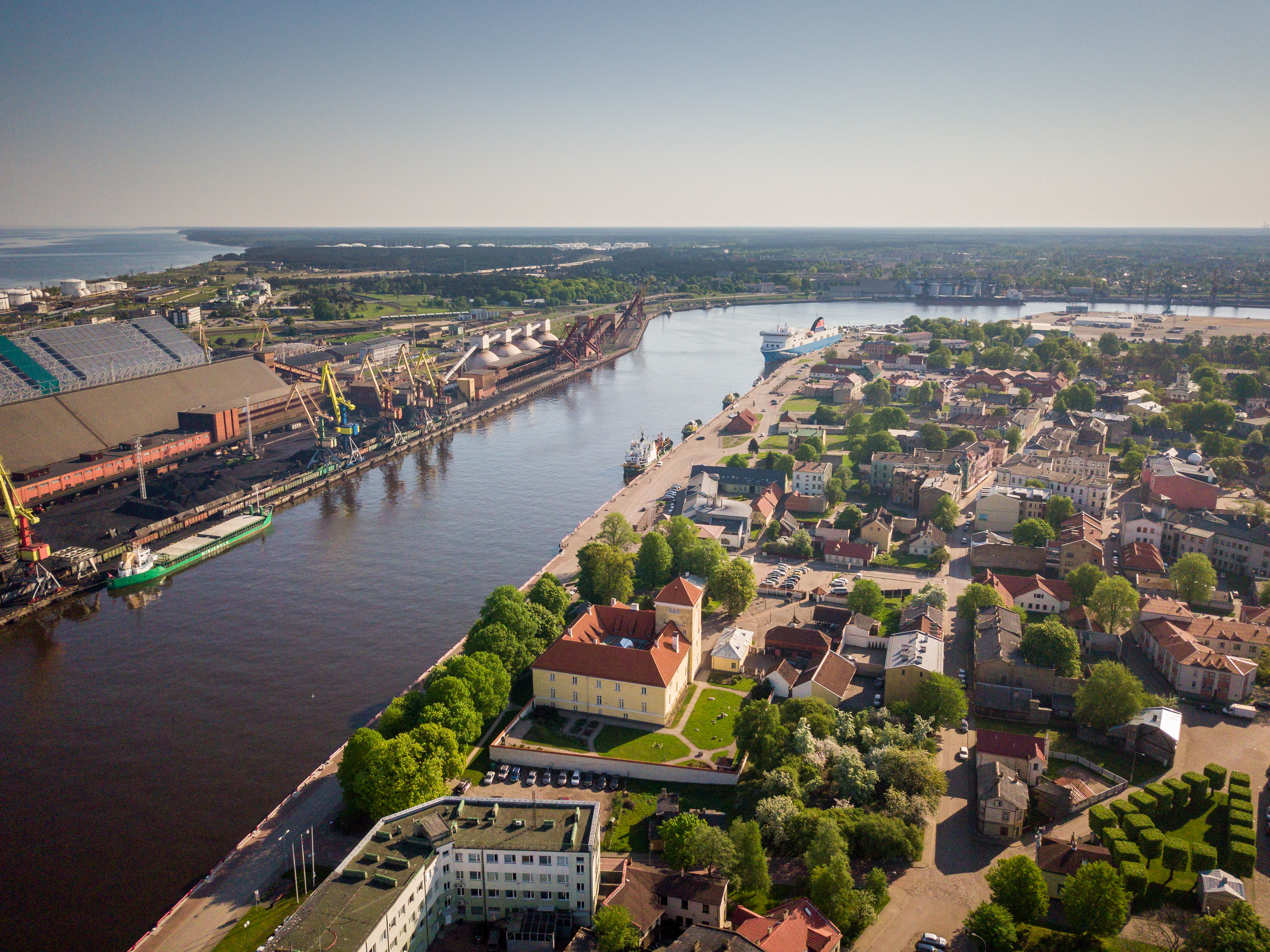
- Aerial view with the Ventspils Castle and port

- Flag Coat of arms Brandmark

- Location in Latvia
- Coordinates: 57°23′26″N 21°34′24″E
- Country: Latvia
- Town rights: 1378

Government
  - Mayor: Jānis Vītoliņš (For Latvia and Ventspils)

Area
  - Total: 57.96 km^{2} (22.38 sq mi)
  - Land: 50.77 km^{2} (19.60 sq mi)
  - Water: 7.19 km^{2} (2.78 sq mi)

Population (2026)
  - Total: 32,479
  - Density: 639.7/km^{2} (1,657/sq mi)

GDP
  - State city: 460,619,000 euro (2021)
  - Per capita: 13,900 euro (2021)
- Time zone: UTC+2 (EET)
  - Summer (DST): UTC+3 (EEST)
- Postal code: LV-36(01-21)
- Calling code: (+371) 636
- Number of city council members: 13
- Website: www.ventspils.lv

Ventspils (Latvian: [ˈvæntspils]) is a state city in northwestern Latvia in the historical Courland region of Latvia, and is the sixth largest city in the country.

At the beginning of 2020, Ventspils had a population of 33,906. It is situated on the Venta River and the Baltic Sea, and has an ice-free port. The city's name literally means "castle on the Venta", referring to the Livonian Order's castle built alongside the Venta River.

== Other names ==
Ventspils was historically known as Windau in German.

It had a Russian name from the time of the Russian Empire, called Виндава (Vindava) or Виндау (Vindau), although Вентспилс (Ventspils) has been used since World War II.

Some other names for the city include Livonian: Vǟnta, Estonian: Vindavi, and Polish: Windawa.

== History ==
Ventspils developed around the Livonian Order Ventspils Castle, built along the Venta River. It was chartered in 1314 and became an important mercantile city of the Hanseatic League.

As part of the Duchy of Courland, Ventspils blossomed as a shipbuilding centre. 44 warships and 79 trading ships were built in the town, and it was from Ventspils that the Duke's fleet set out to colonize Gambia and Tobago. Metal, amber, and wood-working shops also became important to the city's development.

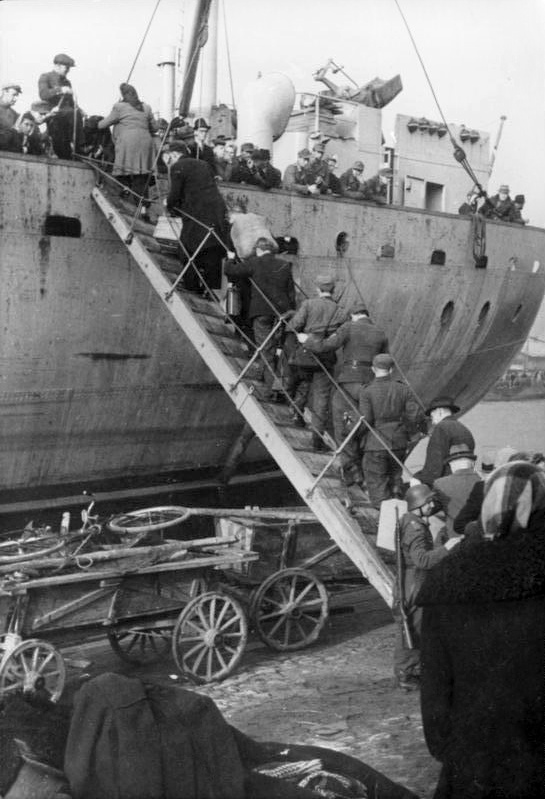
Wehrmacht soldiers and German civilians fleeing advance of Red Army, 1944

During the Polish-Swedish War and the Great Northern War, Ventspils was destroyed, and in 1711 a plague wiped out most of the remaining inhabitants. After the Third Partition of Poland-Lithuania in 1795 Ventspils fell under the control of Russian Empire.

It was not until about 1850 that shipbuilding and trade became important again. The port was modernized in the 1890s and connected to Moscow by rail. It became one of Imperial Russia's most profitable ports, by 1913 turning a yearly profit of 130 million rubles. The population soared as well, growing from 7,000 in 1897, to 29,000 in 1913.

During the German occupation from 1915 to 1919, the population decreased almost by half, though some returned home during the First Republic of Latvia (1918–1940).

In 1939, the Red Army established a base in Ventspils. During World War II, the city was under Soviet occupation from 1940, and then under German occupation from 1941 to 1944. Under Soviet rule, an oil pipeline was built to Ventspils, and became the USSR's leading port in crude oil export. Thirty kilometres (19 miles) north of Ventspils is the ex-Soviet radioastronomy installation VIRAC (Ventspils Starptautiskais radioastronomijas centrs or Ventspils International Radio Astronomy Centre). The existence of the Centrs was unknown to most Latvians until 1994. After independence, the Latvian government began a city-beautification process to make the city more attractive to tourists.

In 2004, Ventspils was a host city for a multi-national (United States, United Kingdom, Poland, Sweden, Russia, Latvia, Denmark, Finland, Norway) naval exercise called Baltic Operations XXXIII (BALTOPS). The force was led by the guided missile cruiser USS Anzio and the destroyer USS Cole. The US vessels were the first American warships to visit the port of Ventspils since Latvian independence was declared.

== Climate ==
Ventspils is in the transition zone between an oceanic climate and a humid continental climate (Cfb and Dfb in the Köppen climate classification) with winters just below freezing point and warm summers. Ventspils holds the national record for the highest temperature ever recorded in Latvia with 37.8 °C (100.0 °F) on 4 August 2014.

Climate data for Ventspils (1991−2020 normals, extremes 1873−present)
Month	Jan	Feb	Mar	Apr	May	Jun	Jul	Aug	Sep	Oct	Nov	Dec	Year
Record high °C (°F)	8.9 (48.0)	14.2 (57.6)	18.6 (65.5)	26.1 (79.0)	31.7 (89.1)	33.1 (91.6)	34.8 (94.6)	37.8 (100.0)	32.2 (90.0)	22.6 (72.7)	15.1 (59.2)	12.5 (54.5)	37.8 (100.0)
Mean daily maximum °C (°F)	1.2 (34.2)	1.0 (33.8)	3.7 (38.7)	8.9 (48.0)	13.9 (57.0)	17.7 (63.9)	20.9 (69.6)	21.1 (70.0)	16.8 (62.2)	11.1 (52.0)	6.1 (43.0)	3.1 (37.6)	10.5 (50.8)
Daily mean °C (°F)	−0.5 (31.1)	−1.1 (30.0)	1.3 (34.3)	5.6 (42.1)	10.4 (50.7)	14.5 (58.1)	17.8 (64.0)	17.8 (64.0)	13.8 (56.8)	8.6 (47.5)	4.2 (39.6)	1.3 (34.3)	7.8 (46.0)
Mean daily minimum °C (°F)	−2.6 (27.3)	−3.3 (26.1)	−1.1 (30.0)	2.8 (37.0)	7.3 (45.1)	11.5 (52.7)	14.7 (58.5)	14.5 (58.1)	10.8 (51.4)	6.0 (42.8)	2.2 (36.0)	−0.7 (30.7)	5.2 (41.3)
Record low °C (°F)	−31.6 (−24.9)	−29.5 (−21.1)	−26.7 (−16.1)	−12.7 (9.1)	−4.3 (24.3)	0.5 (32.9)	4.2 (39.6)	2.6 (36.7)	−2.9 (26.8)	−8.5 (16.7)	−15.0 (5.0)	−25.0 (−13.0)	−31.6 (−24.9)
Average precipitation mm (inches)	59.3 (2.33)	46.3 (1.82)	38.9 (1.53)	31.6 (1.24)	36.8 (1.45)	49.6 (1.95)	63.5 (2.50)	75.9 (2.99)	64.4 (2.54)	84.8 (3.34)	70.6 (2.78)	71.2 (2.80)	692.9 (27.27)
Average precipitation days (≥ 1 mm)	12	10	8	7	7	7	8	10	9	13	13	14	118
Average relative humidity (%)	85.9	84.9	81.6	77.6	77.2	79.1	79.2	77.7	79.3	81.2	85.0	85.4	81.2
Mean monthly sunshine hours	21.2	50.4	128.1	174.4	322.2	268.8	270.4	149.2	127.6	103.3	24.4	25.1	1,665.1
Source 1: LVĢMC
Source 2: NOAA (precipitation days, humidity 1991-2020), infoclimat.fr (sunshine 1991-2020)

Coastal temperature data for Ventspils
Month	Jan	Feb	Mar	Apr	May	Jun	Jul	Aug	Sep	Oct	Nov	Dec	Year
Average sea temperature °C (°F)	2.7 (36.86)	1.6 (34.88)	1.0 (33.80)	3.1 (37.58)	8.3 (46.94)	14.3 (57.74)	18.5 (65.30)	18.9 (66.02)	16.4 (61.52)	11.7 (53.06)	8.3 (46.94)	5.4 (41.72)	9.18 (48.52)
Source:seatemperature.org

== Demography ==
At the beginning of 2017, Ventspils had an official population of 39,447 (54.3% of them were women compared with 45.7% men).

63% of Ventspils population (24,762 people) are 15–62 years old, 14.3% (5,647 people) are 0–14 years old, and 22.6% (8,877 people) are 62 years and over.

Population of Ventspils according to ethnic group:

Ethnic groups	Per cent of total population
Latvians	56.7
Russians	27.3
Ukrainians	4.5
Belarusians	4.2
Poles	1.0
Others	6.3

== Education ==
Institutions of higher education and science include:

- Ventspils University College
- Riga Technical University, Ventspils branch
- Riga Teacher Training and Educational Management Academy, Ventspils branch
- College of Law, Ventspils branch

== Economy ==
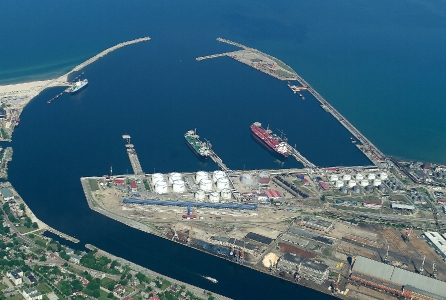
Port of Ventspils

Ventspils is situated at the mouth of the Venta River, where it empties into the Baltic Sea, and is an important ice-free port. Large amounts of oil and other mineral resources from Russia are loaded aboard ships at Ventspils. Ventspils Airport, one of the three international airports in Latvia, is located in the city. Ventspils High Technology Park provides infrastructure and services to IT and electronics companies.

== Culture ==
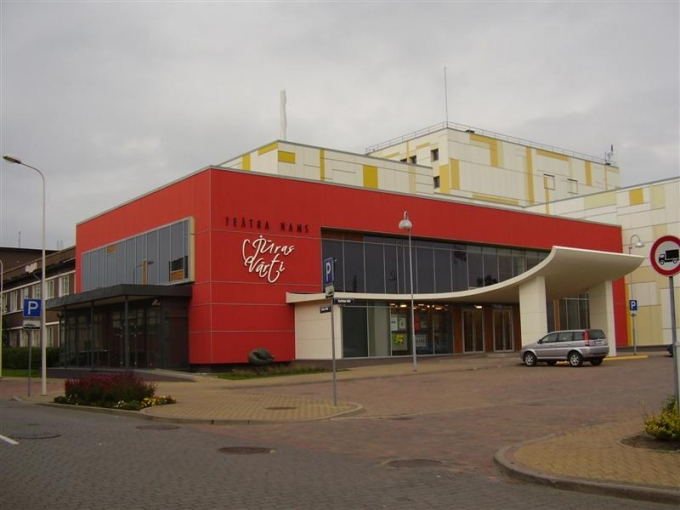
Theatre House "Jūras Vārti"

Every winter Ventspils hosts the awarding ceremony of the Latvian Radio broadcast Musical Bank and the televised national selection for the Eurovision Song Contest. On the second weekend of July the Sea Festival takes place, and on the first weekend of August there is an annual city festival for the city birthday. Festivals Ghetto games and Vakara pastaiga are popular.

There are several institutions taking responsibility for the cultural life of Ventspils, including:

- The Theatre House "Juras varti" presents professional performing arts of various genres.
- The Ventspils Museum is engaged in the research and the recording of the history of Ventspils. It writes the Ventspils City Chronicle, builds up the collections of the museum and carries out scientific work.
- The Ventspils Library is a municipal, cultural, educational, and information institution.
- The International Writers and Translators' House is an international centre for writers and translators.

== Sport ==
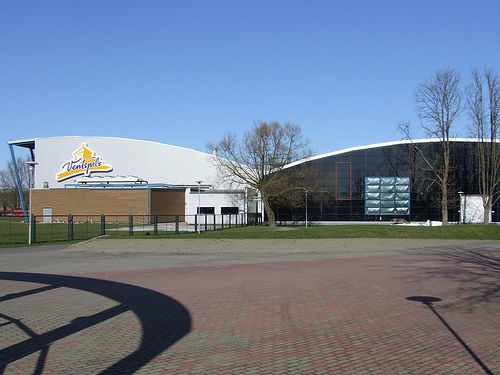
Ventspils' Olympic Centre

Ventspils has a well developed sports infrastructure. One of the most popular sporting facility in Ventspils is the Olympic Centre 'Ventspils' offering a basketball hall, ice hall, track-and-field arena, and football stadiums. One can also enjoy the Water Adventure Park,Seaside Aqua-Park, and Adventure Park that turns into a Skiing Hill 'Lemberga hūte during the winter.

The city has a basketball team that has won the Latvian championship in the last several years. In the 2001/2002 season, the team took third place in the North European Basketball League (NEBL). Ventspils also has a football team in FK Ventspils who compete in the Virsliga. In the 2006 season the team has won the Latvian championship for the first time.

== Adventure Park ==
Ventspils has an Adventure Park (Latvian: Piedzīvojumu parks) that consists of Tube Sliding Track, Airsoft Shooting Range, Bumper boats, Trampoline Complex, Trampoline with Rubber Ribbons, Mad Rotor, Catapult, Trampoline boat, Playhouse for children, Inflatable Attractions in the summer.

In the winter you can go skiing, snowboarding and sledding.

There is also a rodeo track (Latvian: Rodeļu trase) which is available to use all year round

== Tourism ==
Ventspils has a 600 mm (1 ft 11 5/8 in) narrow-gauge train; a beach and dunes and an observatory with a telescope and digital planetarium.

=== Old Town of Ventspils ===
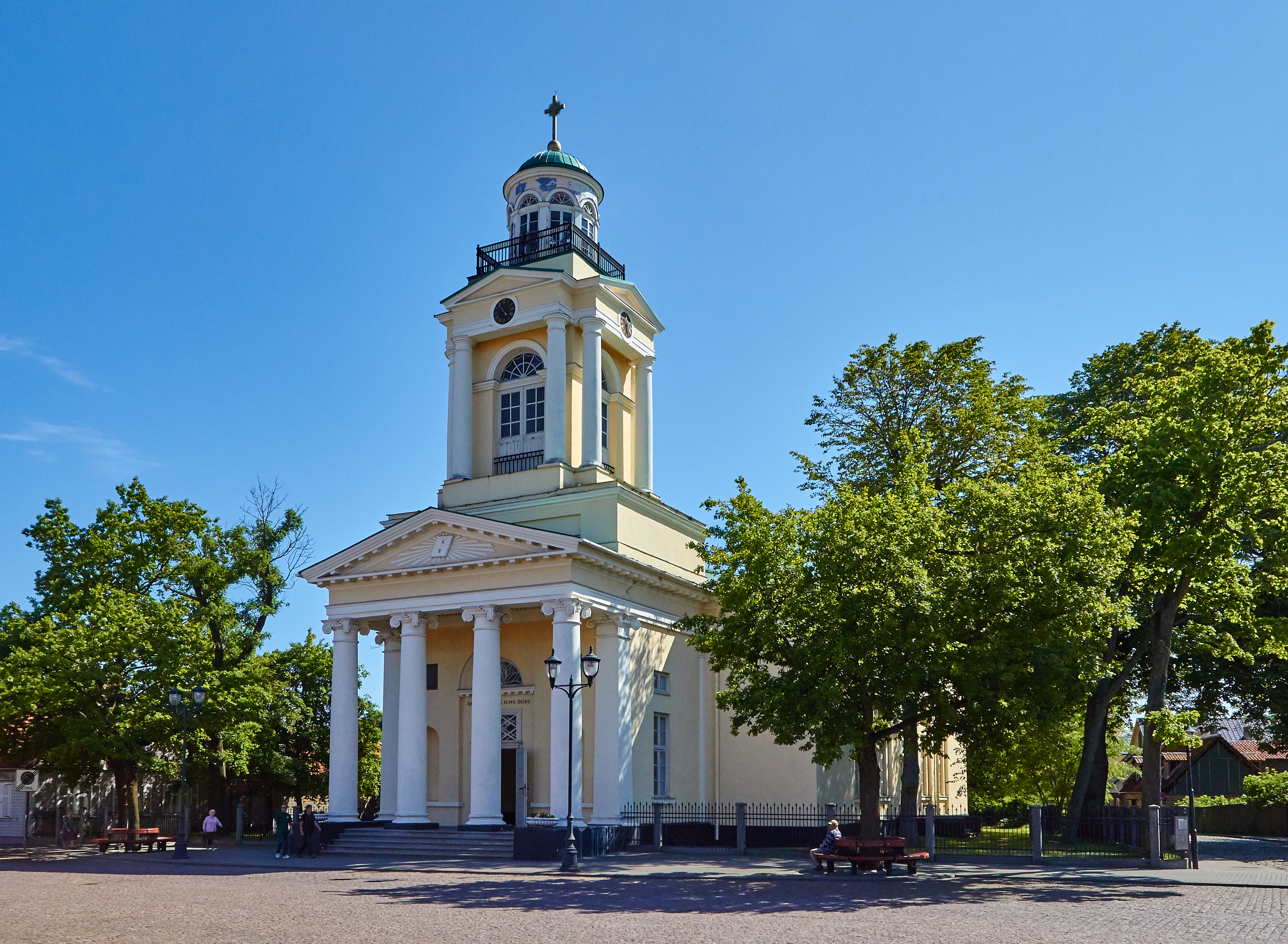
Ventspils Nicholas Lutheran church

Ventspils developed rapidly as a commercial harbour in the years of growth of Duchy of Courland and Semigallia. The most active building works took place in the vicinity of the present Market Square where a number of former storehouses from the 17th century are preserved. A dwelling house at the crossing of Tirgus and Skolas Streets is one of the oldest houses of such type in Latvia (built in 1646).

Next to the Market Square, in a historical school building on Skolas street, there is the Ventspils House of the Crafts (2007). The International Writers’ and Translators’ House (2006) was opened on the premises of the former City Hall (1850), on the City-Hall Square. The building is reconstructed to accommodate creative work and everyday needs of its writers. Located next to it are the recently renovated Ventspils Central Library (2006) and Evangelic-Lutheran Church of Nicholas (1835). The City-Hall Square, the Market Square and the Ostas Street Promenade are popular walking places.

=== Cow sculptures ===
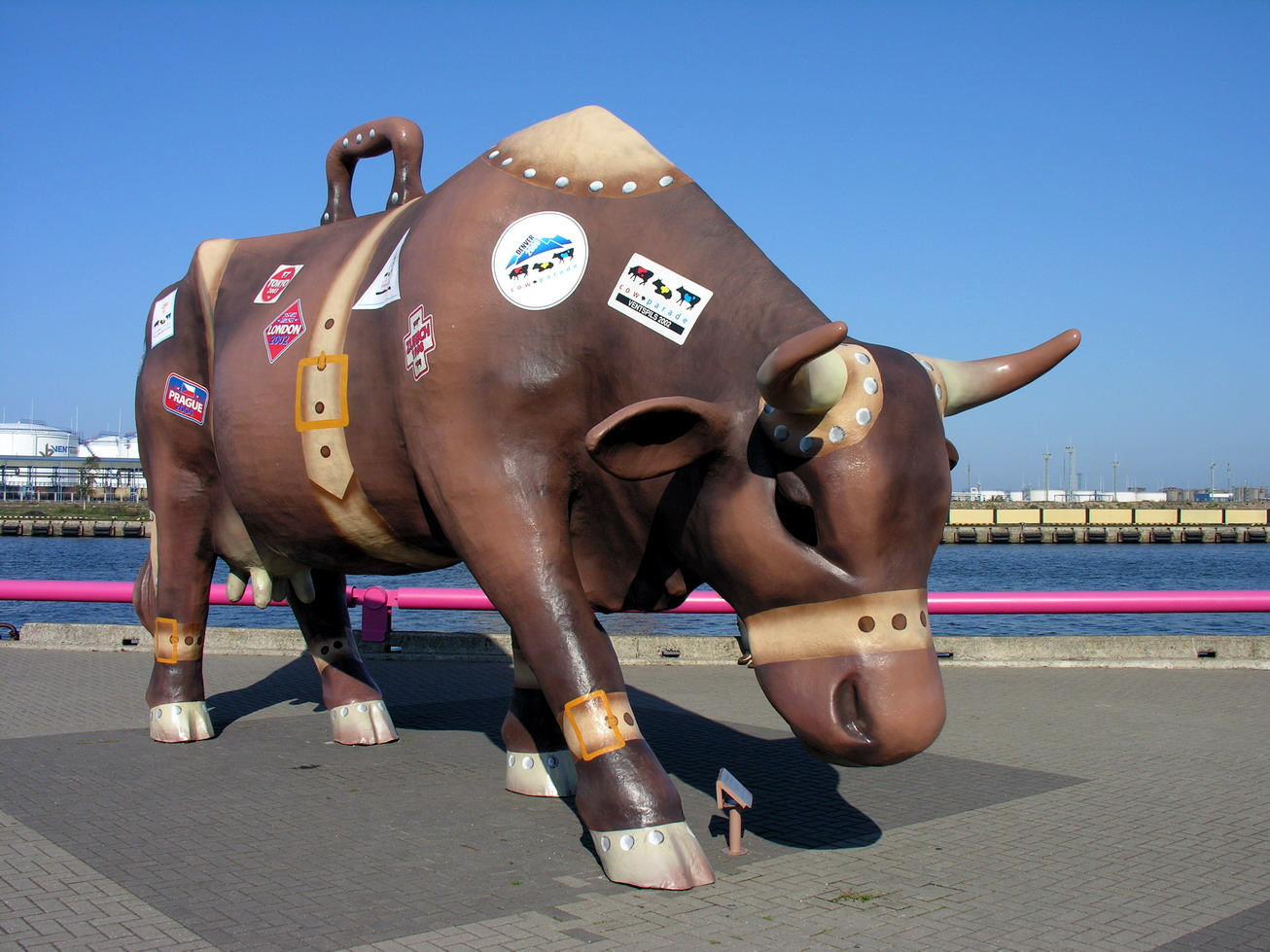
Travelling Cow

CowParade in Ventspils took place in 2002, and now several cow sculptures reside in the city:

- ‘Latvijas melnā’ (Latvian Black Cow) dwells on the Promenade of Ostas iela;
- ‘Pretim gaismai’ (Towards the Light) that usually climbs the lamp post on Pils iela next to ‘Latvenergo’ JSC;
- ‘Ms. Moo-Dunk’ the basketball cow resides near the Basketball Hall of the Olympic Centre ‘Ventspils’;
- ‘Dzīve ir skaista’ (Life is Beautiful) is situated at the Children's Park ‘Bērnu pilsētiņa’ (Children's Town);
- ‘Jūras govs’ (Cow of the Sea) dwells next to the Livonian Order Castle facing the River Venta;
- ‘Nafta’ (Oil) lives next to the Children's Home ‘Selga’;
- ‘Londonas govs’ (London Cow) welcomes the residents of the camping site ‘Piejūras kempings’.

There are also three considerably larger cows:

- ‘Ceļojošā govs’ (Travelling Cow) is shaped like a huge suitcase and awaits the city guests on the Promenade of Ostas iela to take some pictures;
- ‘Govs-Matrozis’ (The Sailor Cow) is a giant blue-coloured cow dressed as a seafarer and situated at the Southern Pier of Ventspils;
- ‘Šūpojošā govs’ (Cow on the Swings) is a large, but cute and girly cow sitting on the swings not far from the excursion boat ‘Hercogs Jēkabs’.

== Notable people ==
- Fred Rebell (1886–1968), twice emigrant to and once deportee from Australia, single-handed sailor, carpenter and a lay preacher
- Dorothy Dworkin (1889–1976), nurse, businesswoman, and philanthropist.
- Francis Rudolph (1921–2005), painter, painted many scenes of the City of London
- Imant Raminsh (born 1943), composer mainly of choral work
- Ģirts Valdis Kristovskis (born 1962), politician, Minister of Foreign Affairs, 2010 to 2011
- Oleg Belozyorov (born 1969), – Russian politician and manager; serving president of Russian Railways since 2015.

=== Sport ===
- Inta Kļimoviča (born 1951), 400 metres athlete, team bronze medallist in the 1976 Summer Olympics
- Sandis Prūsis (born 1965), bobsleigh pilot, competed in the 1992 Winter Olympics
- Gundars Vētra (born 1967), basketball player and coach
- Ēriks Rags (born 1975), javelin thrower, competed at three Summer Olympics
- Valērijs Žolnerovičs (born 1985), athlete, marathon and half marathon runner
- Laura Ikauniece (born 1992), heptathlete, participated in two Olympic Games
- Uvis Balinskis (born 1996), NHL Defenseman and Stanley Cup champion
- Rebeka Ibrahima (born 1998), Olympic weightlifter
- Rūta Kate Lasmane (born 2000), triple jump and long jump athlete, competed at the 2024 Olympic Games
- Roberts Krūzbergs (born 2001), short-track speed skater, bronze medallist at the 2026 Winter Olympics.
- Artūrs Šilovs (born 2001), NHL goaltender

== Twin towns – sister cities ==
Ventspils is twinned with:

- Lorient, France
- Ningbo, China
- Novopolotsk, Belarus
- Polotsk, Belarus
- Stralsund, Germany
- Västervik, Sweden

== Significant depictions in popular culture ==
- Windau (Ventspils) is one of the starting towns of the State of the Teutonic Order in the turn-based strategy game Medieval II: Total War: Kingdoms.
- Windau can be established in trading simulation game Patrician III as an Alderman Task

== See also ==
- Ventspils Castle
- Ports of the Baltic Sea
- List of cities in Latvia
