= Vjačeslavs Dombrovskis =

Latvian politician, economist (born 1977)

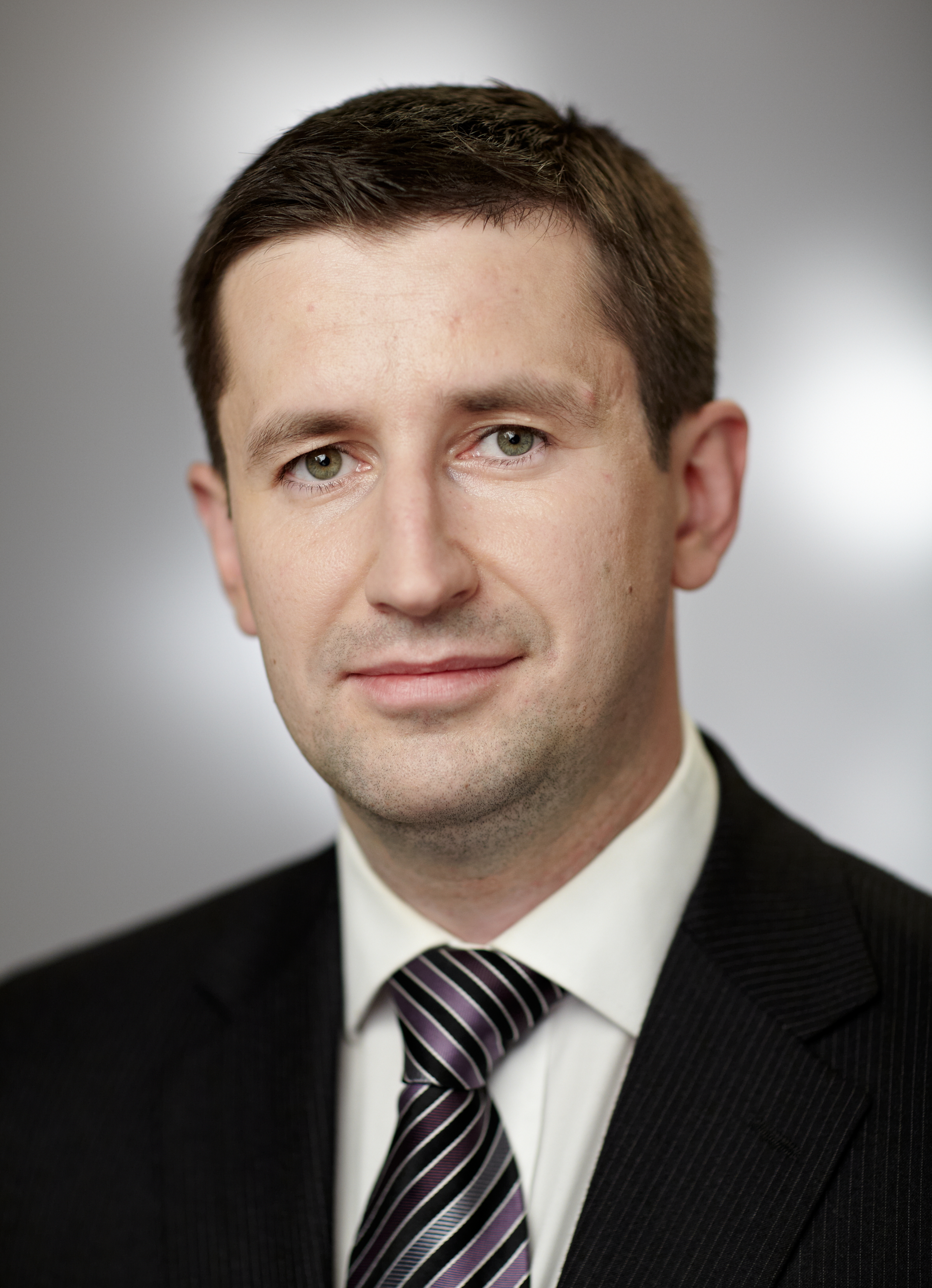

Minister for Education and Science
- In office 2 May 2013 – 22 January 2014
- Prime Minister: Valdis Dombrovskis; Laimdota Straujuma
- Preceded by: Roberts Ķīlis
- Succeeded by: Ina Druviete

Personal details
- Born: 27 December 1977 (age 48) Riga, Soviet Union (now Latvia)
- Party: Reform Party (2011-?); Harmony (2018-2020); Republika (2021-2022); Latvijas attīstībai (2022-)
- Education: University of Latvia; Clark University

Vjačeslavs Dombrovskis (Russian: Вячесла́в Домбро́вский; born 27 December 1977 in Riga) is a Latvian Russian politician and economist, who has previously served as the Minister for Education and Science and as Minister of Economics of Latvia.

Dombrovskis has a bachelor's degree from the University of Latvia in economics and finance and a doctor's degree from Clark University in economics. He also attended George Mason University as Visiting Fulbright Scholar.

Dombrovskis gained Latvian citizenship through naturalization in 1997.

== Science career ==
Vjačeslavs Dombrovskis started his career as a Visiting Researcher in the Center for European Economic Research ZEW in Germany. In 2003 he joined The Baltic International Centre for Economic Policy Studies as a Research Fellow and worked there for almost nine years. From 2003 he also became a member of the Board of Soros Foundation Latvia. Since 2003 he was assistant professor at Stockholm School of Economics in Riga until 2011. In 2015 he founded CERTUS Think Tank, where he was a chairman of the Board till 2018.

== Political career ==
Dombrovskis entered politics in 2011, when he joined the newly founded Zatlers' Reform Party and was elected as a member of the Latvian parliament. For the following two years he was the leader of the Zatlers' Reform Party parliamentary fraction.

Dombrovskis was appointed Minister for Education and Science of Latvia in May 2013, after the resignation of previous Minister Roberts Ķīlis. He vowed to continue to focus on the five education and science priorities set by his predecessor.

He joined the Harmony party in 2018 and was nominated by Nils Ušakovs and Jānis Urbanovičs to be the Harmony party's Prime Ministerial candidate at the 2018 parliamentary elections. In September 2020, Dombrovskis was excluded from Harmony.

In January 2021, Dombrovskis announced that he planned to found a new party in the first half of 2021.
