= Anrijs Matīss =

Latvian politician (born 1973)

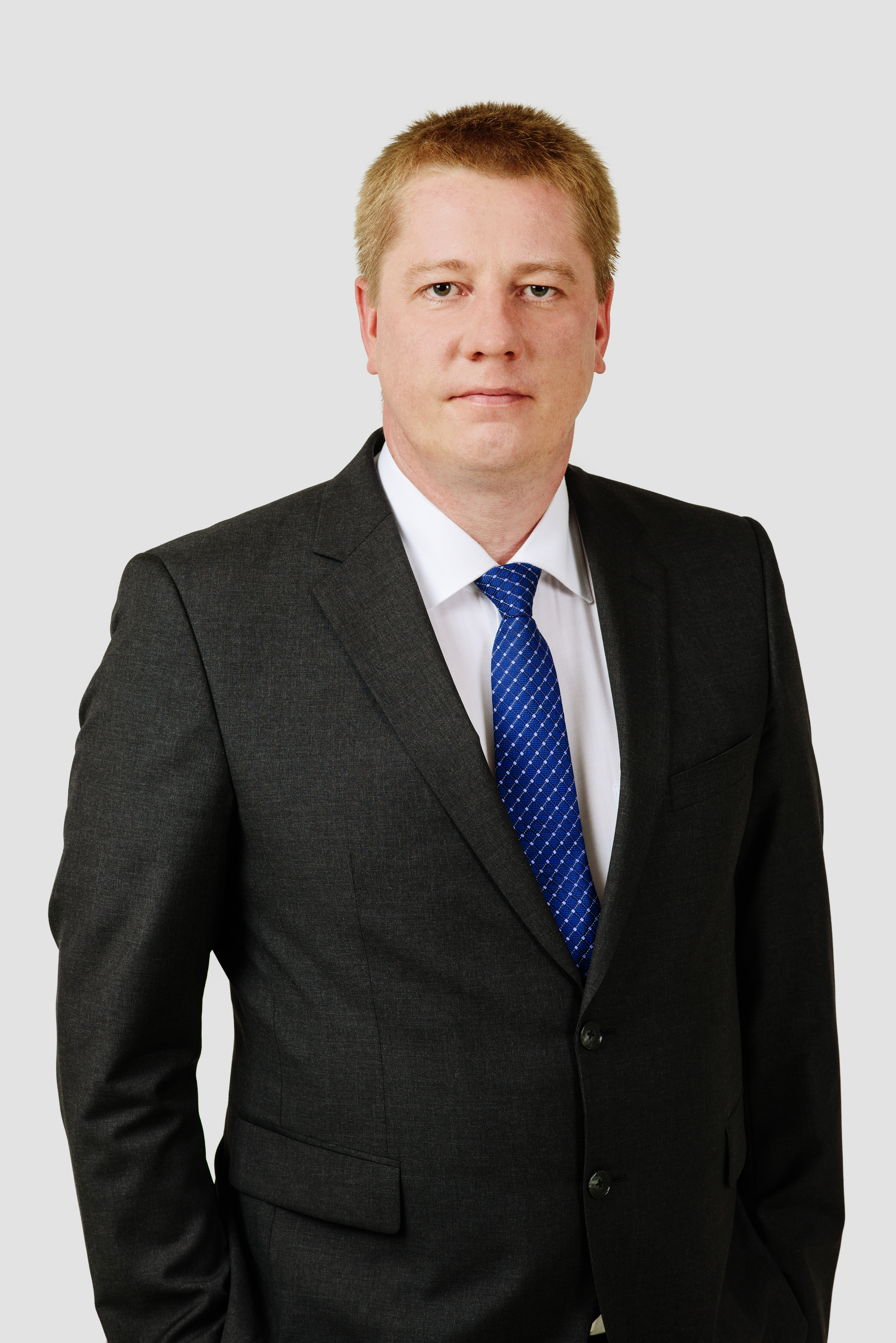
- Anrijs Matīss in 2014

Minister for Transport of Latvia
- In office 1 March 2013 – November 2015
- Prime Minister: Valdis Dombrovskis
- Preceded by: Aivis Ronis
- Succeeded by: Rihards Kozlovskis

Personal details
- Born: 13 September 1973 (age 53) Riga, Latvian SSR
- Party: Republika (2021-present)
- Other political affiliations: Unity (2014-2017); Harmony (2018-2021)
- Education: Riga Technical University

Anrijs Matīss (born 13 September 1973) is a Latvian politician and former Minister for Transport of Latvia.
