= Jānis Dūklavs =

Latvian politician

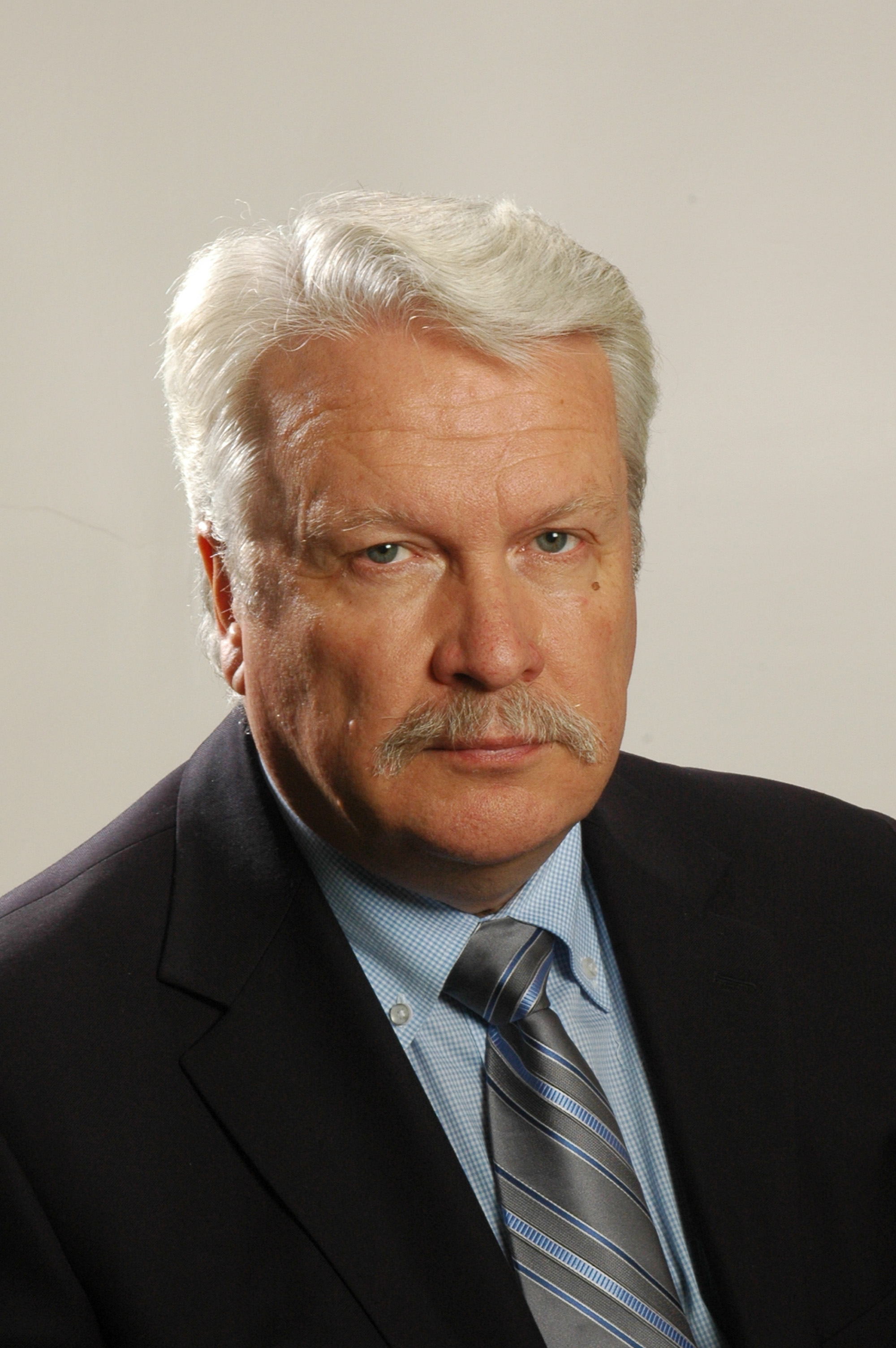

Minister of Agriculture
- In office 22 January 2014 – 23 January 2019
- Prime Minister: Laimdota Straujuma; Māris Kučinskis
- Preceded by: Laimdota Straujuma
- Succeeded by: Kaspars Gerhards
- In office 12 March 2009 – 25 October 2011
- Prime Minister: Valdis Dombrovskis
- Preceded by: Mārtiņš Roze
- Succeeded by: Laimdota Straujuma

Personal details
- Born: 24 November 1952 (age 73) Ķegums, Latvia
- Party: Union of Greens and Farmers

Jānis Dūklavs (born 24 November 1952) is a Latvian politician from the Union of Greens and Farmers political alliance. Dūklavs was Minister of Agriculture of Latvia from 2009 to 2011 and again from 2014 to 2019.

Dūklavs came into disrepute during the Hotel Rīdzene leaks scandal in 2017, during which transcripts of secretly recorded talks between Aivars Lembergs, Andris Šķēle, Ainārs Šlesers and other individuals at the Hotel Rīdzene were published by the Ir magazine. The transcripts of the recordings feature Dūklavs asking Ainārs Šlesers for help selling a piece of undeclared land next to the Riga Freeport for 15 million euros.
