= List of ministers of finance of Latvia =

The minister of finance of Latvia is a member of the Cabinet of Ministers of Latvia, and is the political leader of the Ministry of Finance of Latvia. Māris Kučinskis is the current officeholder since 28 May 2026.

== Ministers from 1926 to 1940 ==
- Arturs Alberings, 10 September 1926 — 18 December 1926
- Voldemārs Bastjānis, 19 December 1926 — 23 January 1928
- Pēteris Juraševskis, 24 January 1928 — 7 March 1928
- Roberts Liepiņš, 8 March 1928 — 30 November 1928
- Ansis Petrevics, 1 December 1928 — 26 March 1931
- Jānis Annuss, 27 March 1931 — 6 December 1931
- Gustavs Zemgals, 11 December 1931 — 20 February 1932
- Marģers Skujenieks, 21 February 1932 — 23 March 1933
- Jānis Annuss, 24 March 1933 — 16 March 1934
- Ēvalds Rimbenieks, 17 March 1934 — 15 May 1934
- Ludvigs Ēķis, 16 May 1934 — 15 June 1938
- Alfrēds Valdmanis, 16 June 1938 — 25 October 1939
- Jānis Kaminskis, 26 October 1939 — 16 June 1940

== Ministers since 1990 ==
Name	Took office	Left office	Party
Elmārs Siliņš	14 May 1990	18 May 1993	Independent
Uldis Osis	3 August 1993	19 September 1994	Latvian Way
Andris Piebalgs	19 September 1994	25 May 1995	Latvian Way
Indra Sāmīte	25 May 1995	21 December 1995	Latvian Way
Aivars Kreituss	21 December 1995	2 October 1996	Democratic Party "Saimnieks"
Andris Šķēle	2 October 1996	16 January 1997	Independent
Vasīlijs Meļņiks	17 January 1997	22 January 1997	Democratic Party "Saimnieks"
Andris Šķēle	22 January 1997	26 February 1997	Independent
Roberts Zīle	27 February 1997	26 November 1998	For Fatherland and Freedom (until 7 August 1997); For Fatherland and Freedom/LNNK (after 7 August 1997)
Ivars Godmanis	26 November 1998	16 July 1999	Latvian Way
Edmunds Krastiņš	16 July 1999	5 May 2000	People's Party
Gundars Bērziņš	5 May 2000	7 November 2002	People's Party
Valdis Dombrovskis	7 November 2002	9 March 2004	New Era Party
Oskars Spurdziņš	9 March 2004	20 December 2007	People's Party
Atis Slakteris	20 December 2007	12 March 2009	People's Party
Einars Repše	12 March 2009	3 November 2010	New Era Party
Andris Vilks	3 November 2010	5 November 2014	Civic Union (until 6 August 2011)
Andris Vilks	3 November 2010	5 November 2014	Unity (from 6 August 2011)
Jānis Reirs	5 November 2014	11 February 2016	Unity
Dana Reizniece-Ozola	11 February 2016	23 January 2019	Union of Greens and Farmers
Jānis Reirs	23 January 2019	14 December 2022	New Unity
Arvils Ašeradens	14 December 2022	28 May 2026	New Unity
Māris Kučinskis	28 May 2026	Incumbent	United List
