= Māris Kučinskis =

Latvian politician

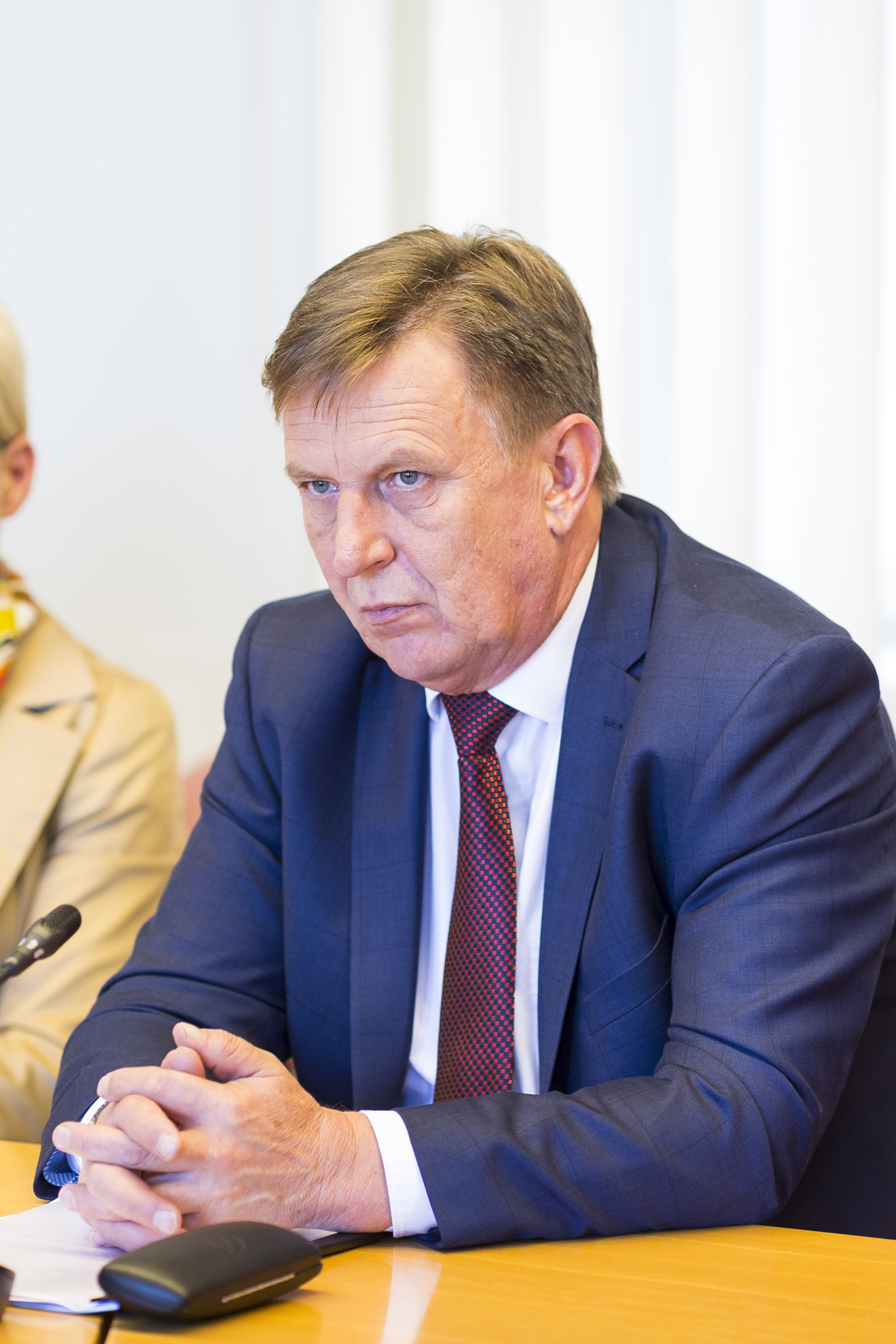
- Kučinskis in 2016

22nd Prime Minister of Latvia
- In office 11 February 2016 – 23 January 2019
- President: Raimonds Vējonis
- Preceded by: Laimdota Straujuma
- Succeeded by: Krišjānis Kariņš

Minister of Regional Development and Local Government
- In office 2 December 2004 – 7 November 2006
- Prime Minister: Aigars Kalvītis
- Preceded by: Andrejs Radzevičs
- Succeeded by: Aigars Štokenbergs

Minister of Finance
- In office 28 May 2026 – 17 November 2026
- Prime Minister: Andris Kulbergs
- Preceded by: Arvils Ašeradens
- Succeeded by: Kārlis Purgailis

Personal details
- Born: 28 November 1961 (age 64) Ķirbiži, Latvian Soviet Socialist Republic
- Party: People's Party (1998–2011); Liepāja Party (2014–present)
- Other political affiliations: Union of Greens and Farmers (2014–2022); United List (2022–present)
- Spouse: Laine Kučinska
- Children: 2
- Education: University of Latvia

Māris Kučinskis (born 28 November 1961) is a Latvian politician, who served as the prime minister of Latvia, from 2016 to 2019.

== Early life and career ==
Māris Kučinskis was born on 28 November 1961, in Limbaži district, Latvia, where he lived until the age of 16. After primary school in the village of Ķirbiži, he moved to the town of Valmiera, where he studied at Valmiera Secondary School No. 4. After graduating in 1980, he began to work as an economist at the finance department of The Valmiera Board of People's Deputies. From 1981 to 1984, he served in the Soviet army and then entered the Faculty of management and economic information of the Latvian State University. At the same time, from 1984, he began to work as chief accountant at the Valmiera plant of fire prevention equipment.

In 1987, Kučinskis was invited to become the chief economist of the district housing and communal department of The Valmiera Board of People's Deputies. In 1991, he founded the private company Apgāds Ltd, which specialized in the trade of construction materials. He worked there as deputy director until 1994 and as director from 1997 to 1998.

While on a break from political activity from November 2011, Kučinskis was an adviser to the Deputy Executive Director of The Association of greater Latvian cities (Latvijas Lielo Pilsētu asociācijā, LLPA). This organization joins 9 Latvian cities of republican subordination. From September 2013 until February 2016, he was LLPA leader.

== Political career ==
=== Mayor of Valmiera ===
Kučinskis was first elected to Valmiera city council in 1994 and became its chairman in 1996. He was re-elected in 1998 he was elected and continued as chairman until 2002. From 1998—2000 he was also Chairman of Valmiera district council. He joined the People's Party in 1997.

=== Saeima deputy and Minister of Environment and Regional Development ===
Kučinskis become a Deputy of the Saeima for the first time in 2002 as a member of the People's Party, when its political boss Andris Šķēle announced his retirement from politics, but remained, as he stated, an "ordinary member" of the Party and was thought to have a considerable behind-the-scenes influence. In the cabinet led by Aigars Kalvītis, Kučinskis was Minister of Environment and Regional development from 2004-2006.

In October 2006 Kučinskis was once more elected a Deputy of the Saeima and became a chairman of the People's Party faction in parliament. This position was subsequently given to Vineta Muižniece. In October 2009, when The People's Party found itself in a deep crisis, Šķēle returned to politics as the chairman of the party. Kučinskis began to work at the Board as a member. In 2010 Muižniece was appointed as a judge of the Constitutional Court and Kučinskis returned to lead the parliamentary faction.

In October 2010 Kučinskis was elected as a member of the parliament from the party alliance For a Good Latvia which included the People's Party.

At the early election of 2011 Kučinskis ran for the Union of Greens and Farmers alliance, but didn't win a place in Parliament. When his party fraction member Iveta Grigule was elected as a Deputy of the European Parliament, he took her seat in the 11th Saeima. In October 2014 he was elected as a Deputy of the 12th Saeima and became the Chairman of the Parliamentary commission on long-term development.

== Prime minister ==
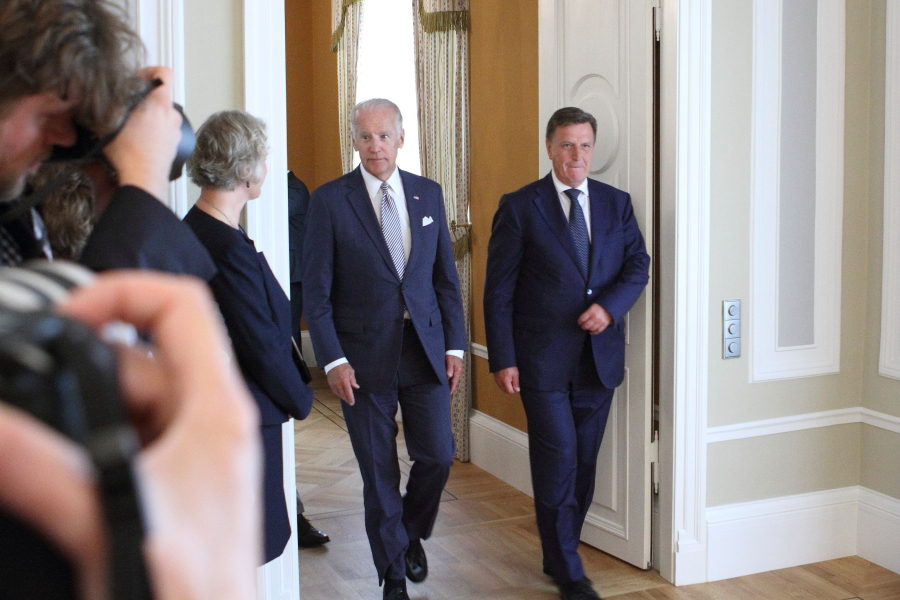
Latvian Prime Minister Māris Kučinskis with American Vice President Joe Biden during his visit to Latvia in 2016.

On 13 January 2016 he was nominated by President Raimonds Vējonis to replace Laimdota Straujuma as the Prime Minister of Latvia following her resignation the previous December and his cabinet was approved by the Saeima on 11 February. He was the first prime minister not to be a member of the Unity Party or one of its predecessors since 2009, and the first from the Union of Greens and Farmers since 2004.

Under Kučinskis, Latvia raised defense spending to fulfill its commitment as a member of NATO to spend 2% of the country's GDP on defense. In July 2017, he rejected American President Donald Trump's proposal that NATO raise its spending requirement to 4% of GDP.

In March 2016, Kučinskis supported acquiescing to a demand by Turkey for €3 billion in exchange for keeping refugees from the Syrian Civil War, arguing that the payment would be more favorable than an "uncontrolled migrant flow" to Latvia.

=== 2018 parliamentary election ===
On 12 February 2018, Kučinskis confirmed that he would run in the October 2018 election, and that he would be willing to serve another term as prime minister if his party was successful enough in the elections. On 6 October, the Union of Greens and Farmers lost 10 seats in Saeima and became the sixth largest faction in parliament. Four days after the election, New Conservative Party leader Jānis Bordāns announced his party would refuse to work in a coalition with the Union of Greens and Farmers. Although Bordāns would fail to form a government, the New Conservative Party eventually formed a coalition with Who Owns The State?, Development/For!, National Alliance, and New Unity while the Union of Greens and Farmers went into opposition with Harmony. Kučinskis was replaced by New Unity candidate Krišjānis Kariņš as prime minister on 23 January 2019.

== Post-premiership ==
Despite losing the prime ministership, Kučinskis was re-elected to Saeima in the October 2018 election, and became the head of the National Security Committee on 21 November over the objections of the New Conservative Party. On 11 April 2019, he joined his party in voting for a motion of no confidence against Kariņš that failed 33-58.

== See also ==
- Kučinskis cabinet

Political offices
Preceded by Laimdota Straujuma	Prime Minister of Latvia; 2016–2019	Succeeded by Krišjānis Kariņš
