= Laimdota Straujuma =

Latvian economist and politician

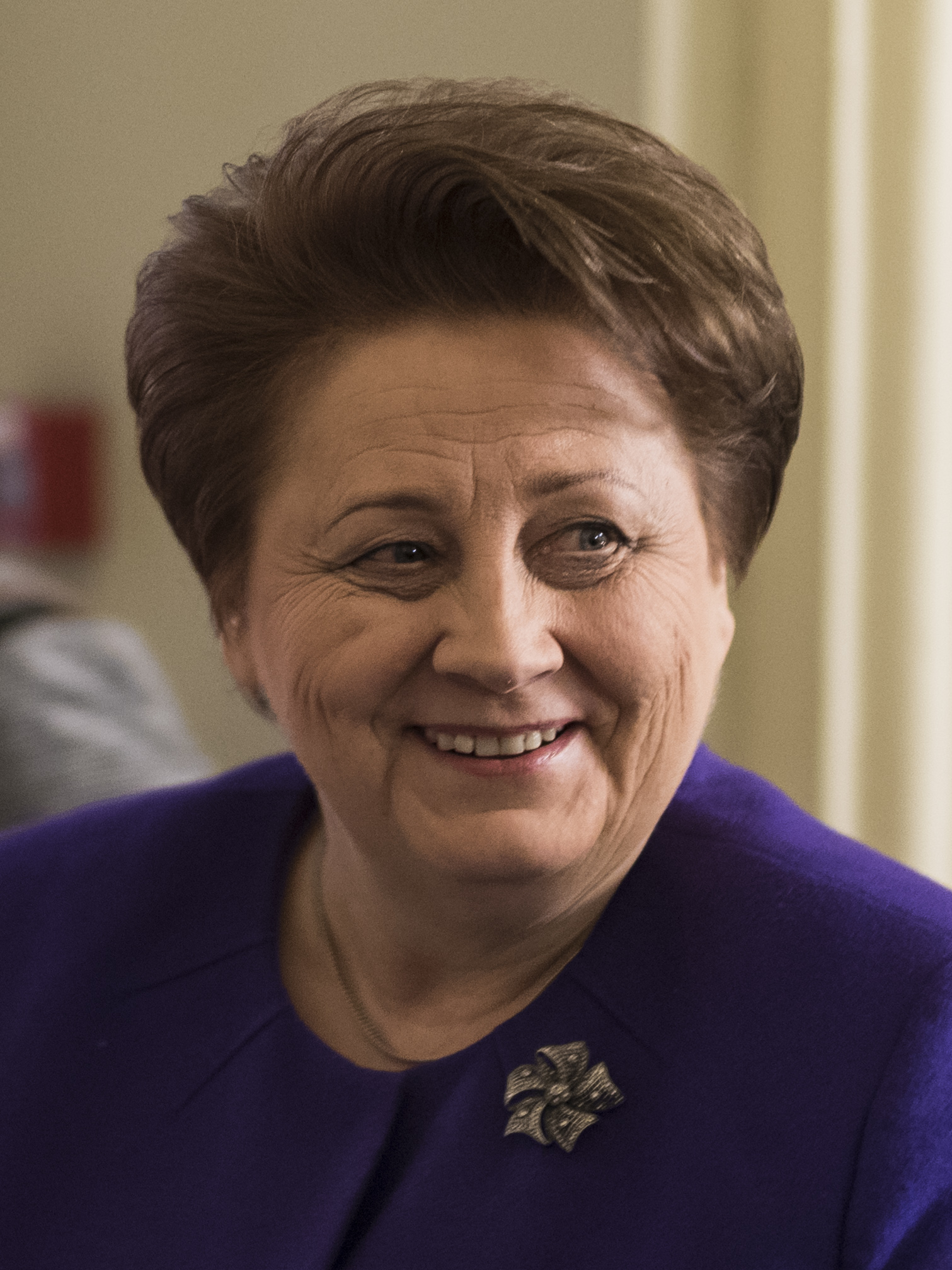
- Straujuma in 2016

21st Prime Minister of Latvia
- In office 22 January 2014 – 11 February 2016
- President: Andris Bērziņš; Raimonds Vējonis
- Preceded by: Valdis Dombrovskis
- Succeeded by: Māris Kučinskis

Minister of Agriculture
- In office 25 October 2011 – 22 January 2014
- Prime Minister: Valdis Dombrovskis
- Preceded by: Jānis Dūklavs
- Succeeded by: Jānis Dūklavs

Personal details
- Born: 24 February 1951 (age 75) Mežvidi, then part of Latvian SSR, Soviet Union
- Party: People's Party (1998–2011); Unity (2011–present)
- Education: University of Latvia; Latvian Academy of Sciences
- Awards: Cross of Recognition

Laimdota Straujuma (born 24 February 1951) is a Latvian economist who was the prime minister of Latvia from January 2014 to February 2016. Before her tenure as prime minister, she served as the minister of Agriculture from 2011 to 2014. She was the first woman to serve as the head of government of the country. After her resignation on 7 December 2015, she announced her intention to resume a seat in the Saeima.

== Early career ==
Between October 2000 and 2006, Straujuma served as the Secretary of State of the Ministry for Agriculture. Between 2007 and 2010, she was the Secretary of State of the Ministry for Regional Development and Local Government. She was appointed as Minister of Agriculture on 25 October 2011.

Straujuma joined the People's Party in 1998. She began working in the Ministry of Agriculture in 1999. She became the ministry's state secretary in 2000. Straujuma oversaw the distribution of agricultural subsidies from the European Union following Latvia's membership in 2004. She became the state secretary for the Ministry of Regional Development and Municipalities in 2007, holding the position until 2010. In 2011, Prime Minister Valdis Dombrovskis appointed Straujuma Minister of Agriculture. As minister, Straujuma was responsible for the efforts to increase the European Union's farm subsidies, which eventually proved successful. She left the People's Party in 2011 and then joined Unity.

== Prime Minister of Latvia ==
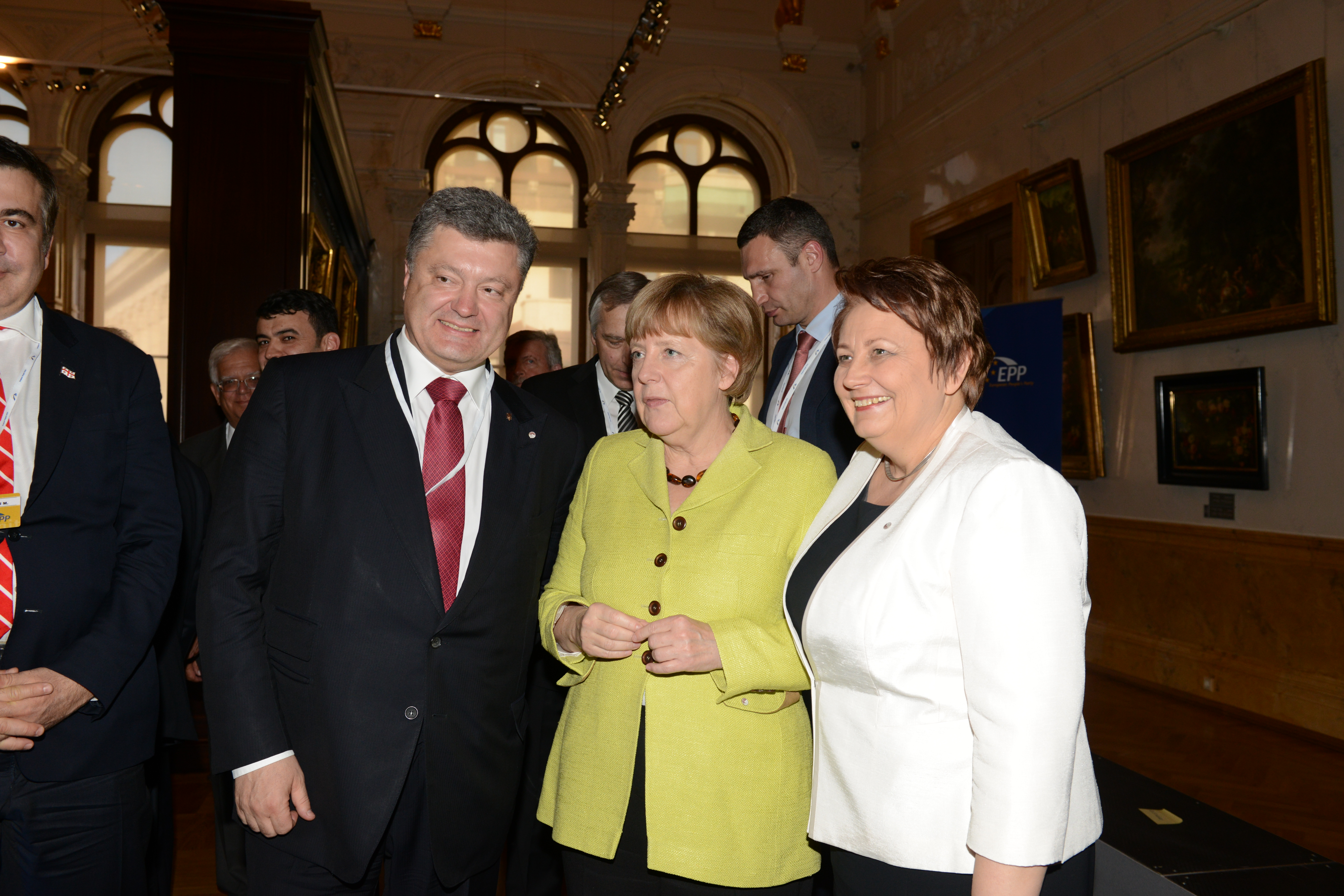
Straujuma with German Chancellor Angela Merkel and Ukrainian President Petro Poroshenko with in the EPP Eastern Partnership Leaders' Meeting in Riga, 21 May 2015

On 5 January 2014, the Unity Party nominated Straujuma as a candidate for the post of Prime Minister following the resignation of Dombrovskis. The nomination was supported by Unity's coalition partners, the Reform Party and the National Alliance, as well as the opposition Union of Greens and Farmers.

Following the 2014 parliamentary election, in which the Unity Party came in second, the President of Latvia Andris Bērziņš nominated Straujuma to lead the new government, which was approved by Saeima on 5 November 2014.

As the country's first female prime minister, her term lasted nearly two years and her tenure focused on strengthening national defence in the wake of the Russian annexation of Crimea.

=== Resignation ===
Straujuma resigned on 7 December 2015. Media reports claimed Straujuma struggled to maintain cohesion within the coalition in the months preceding her resignation over the overwhelming issues of the European migrant crisis, teacher strikes and disagreement over strategy for state assistance to the debt-laden national airline Air Baltic. Reallocation of funds to ensure the country moved closer to NATO's 2% GDP defence spending requirement in light of the security situation helped make the 2016 budget controversial. The chairwoman of the Unity Party Solvita Āboltiņa criticised Straujuma's alleged lack of authority. Straujuma upon her resignation stated that there was a need in the government for "new ideas, a new contribution and a new energy". She personally recommended incumbent Interior Minister Rihards Kozlovskis as a successor. He later declined the role in an interview with Radio Latvia.

== Honour ==
- Cross of Recognition

== See also ==
- First Straujuma cabinet
- Second Straujuma cabinet

Political offices
| Preceded by Jānis Dūklavs | Minister of Agriculture; 2011–2014 | Succeeded by Jānis Dūklavs |
| Preceded by Valdis Dombrovskis | Prime Minister of Latvia; 2014–2016 | Succeeded by Māris Kučinskis |
