= Ilze Indriksone =

Latvian politician

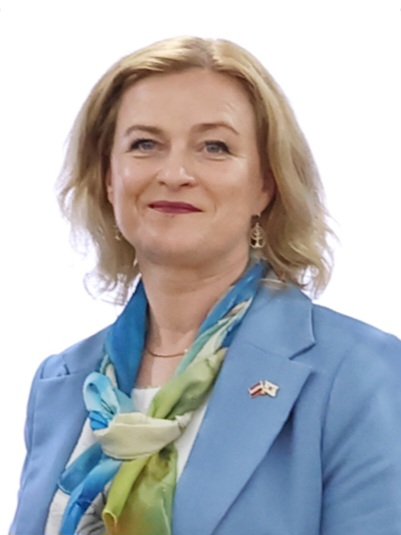
- Indriksone in 2023

Chairwoman of the National Alliance
- Incumbent
- Assumed office 15 December 2024
- Preceded by: Raivis Dzintars

Minister of Welfare
- Incumbent
- Assumed office 19 November 2026
- Prime Minister: Andris Kulbergs
- Preceded by: Uldis Augulis (acting)

Minister of Education and Science
- In office 28 May 2026 – 19 November 2026
- Prime Minister: Andris Kulbergs
- Preceded by: Dace Melbārde
- Succeeded by: Česlavs Batņa

Minister of Economics
- In office 26 May 2022 – 15 September 2023
- Prime Minister: Krišjānis Kariņš
- Preceded by: Kaspars Gerhards (acting)
- Succeeded by: Viktors Valainis

Member of the Saeima
- Incumbent
- Assumed office 6 November 2018

Personal details
- Born: 29 October 1974 (age 52) Talsi, Latvian SSR
- Party: NA (since 2011)
- Other political affiliations: TB/LNNK (2000–2011)
- Spouse: Māris Liepiņš (m. 1994; div. 2011)
- Children: 4
- Education: University of Latvia; Latvia University of Life Sciences and Technologies
- Profession: Environmental planner
- Awards: Grand Cross of the Order of Merit of the Grand Duchy of Luxembourg

Ilze Indriksone (born 29 October 1974) is a Latvian environmental planner and politician representing the National Alliance (NA) party. From May 2022 to September 2023, she served as the Minister of Economics. She was a member of the 13th Saeima (elected from the NA) and during that term, she was parliamentary secretary of the Ministry of Economy and deputy chairman of the Talsi Municipal Council. Indriksone is also member of the board of the Pedvale Open Air Museum. In 2022, Indriksone was elected in the 14th Saeima. On 15 December 2024, Indriksone has been elected as the chairwoman of the National Alliance, succeeding long-time leader Raivis Dzintars.

== Early life and career ==
Indriksone was born on 29 October 1974 in Talsi. After graduating from Laidze elementary school, She continued her studies at the Talsi State Gymnasium, which she graduated in 1992. After that, she graduated from Latvia University of Life Sciences and Technologies (qualification of environmental engineer, bachelor's degree in environmental sciences, 1998) and Faculty of Business, Management and Economics of the University of Latvia (master's degree in environmental management, 2001).

Before being elected to the Saeima, Indriksone worked, among other things, as a freelance landscaper, as deputy chairwoman of the Talsi municipal council and before that from 2010 to 2016 as head of the passenger transport department of Talsi Autotransports.

== Political activities ==
In 2000, Indriksone became involved in politics, joining the party For Fatherland and Freedom/LNNK. In the 2013 municipal elections, she was elected to the Talsi Municipal Council, representing the National Alliance. She was also elected in the 2017 TMC elections. Indriksone was the deputy chairperson of the TMC (2017-2018). In 2014, she ran for the European Parliament elections, but she did not get elected.

In the 2018 parliamentary election, Indriksone was elected to the 13th Saeima. From August 2021 until the termination of the mandate of the deputy, she was the parliamentary secretary of the Ministry of Economy. After the resignation of the economic minister Jānis Vitenbergs in May 2022, Indriksone was nominated as the candidate of the NA for the post of Minister of Economy. On 26 May, the Saeima approved her as economic minister.

Indriksone participated in the 2022 Latvian parliamentary election as part of the NA and was elected, and has continued to serve as the Minister of Justice in the Second Kariņš cabinet.

== Personal life ==
Indriksone is divorced. She was married to Māris Liepiņš from 1994 to 2011 and she has four children. She is passionate about folk dancing and gardening.
