= Rising Sun for Latvia =

Political party in Latvia

Rising Sun for Latvia Austošā Saule Latvijai
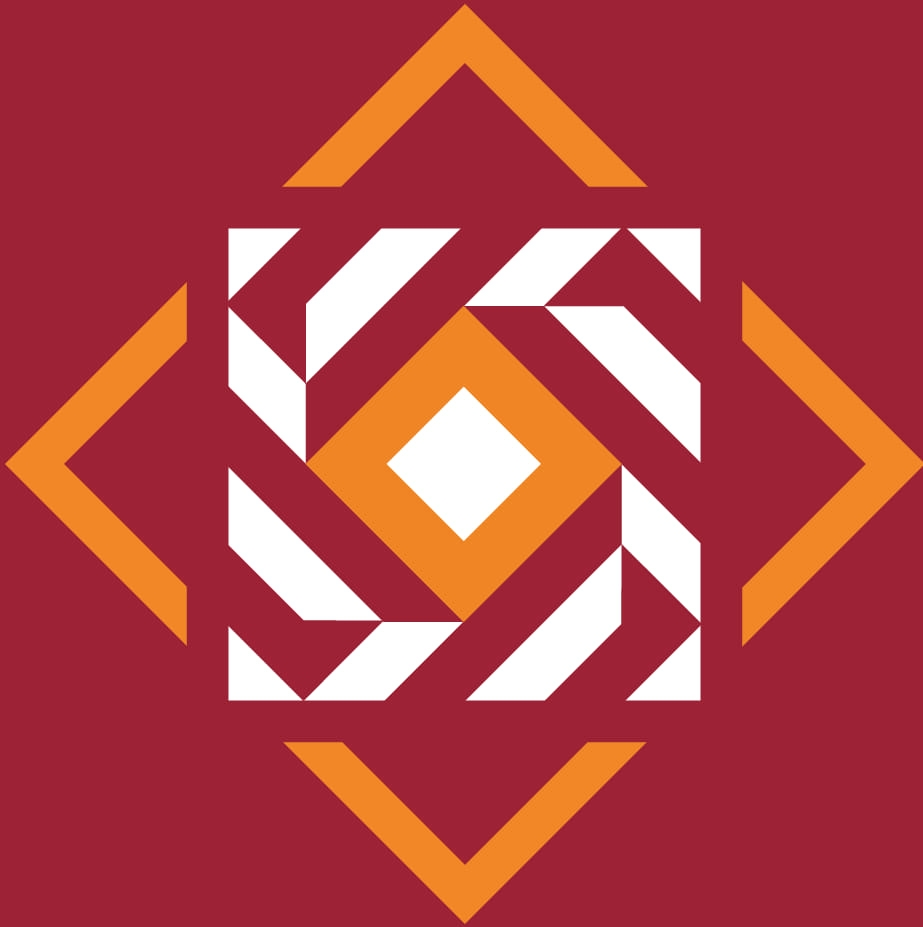
- Abbreviation: ASL
- Leader: Raivis Zeltīts
- Founded: September 4, 2020
- Registered: August 23, 2025 (as party)
- Membership (2026): ▲521
- Ideology: Ethnic nationalism National conservatism Antiglobalism
- Political position: Right-wing to far-right
- Colors: Carmine; Orange
- Slogan: For Latvia – national, safe and prosperous!
- Saeima: 0 / 100
- European Parliament: 0 / 9

Website
- austsaule.lv

Rising Sun for Latvia (Latvian: Austošā Saule Latvijai) is an ethnic nationalist and national conservative Latvian political party founded on 23 August 2025 in Riga. Its chair is former National Alliance Secretary-General Raivis Zeltīts.

== History ==
The party emerged from the nationalist association "Austošā Saule" (Rising Sun), founded on 4 September 2020. The association has organized public activities, including a protest in Riga in September 2023 for closure of the Moscow House in Riga and in January 2024 calling for a halt to imports and transit of Russian goods. The organization criticized the National Alliance Justice for including the New Conservative Party in an appeal for the nationalist parties to unite. It also organized several support activities for Ukraine, including "Azovstal" defenders support rally in June 2024.

On 23 August 2025, Rising Sun for Latvia held its founding congress at the VEF Culture Palace in Riga.

== Leadership and organization ==
At the founding congress, Raivis Zeltīts was elected chairman of the board. Seven board members were elected: Dace Lindberga, Ieva Duļevska, Oto Brantevics, Gatis Ilgažs, Viesturs Arklons, Sandis Riekstiņš and Matīss Žuravļevs.

At the 1st congress of the party, Raivis Zeltīts was re-elected as the chairman of the party board. Dace Lindberga, Jānis Zalāns, Gatis Ilgažs, Viesturs Arklons, Matīss Žuravļevs, Andris Velps and Sandis Riekstiņš were elected as members of the party board.

== Ideology and policies ==
The party's self-described principles are nationalism and conservatism. During the 2026 Latvian parliamentary election campaign, it named stopping mass immigration as its top priority, followed by promoting higher birth rates through expanded family support measures. The party also pledged to strengthen family values in education and the media, and proposed policies aimed at accelerating economic growth, including investing second-pillar pension savings in the national economy, reducing social contributions, and increasing the personal income tax-free allowance.

It has named Russian imperialism as the main threat to Latvia and proposes strengthening the Baltic states' eastern border with a joint defense line, including anti-tank ditches and minefields. It advocates to "set a deadline for the cessation of non-citizen status in Latvia, while simultaneously assessing the possibilities of applying the 1949 Geneva Conventions in the context of de-occupation, and facilitating the repatriation of disloyal immigrants of Soviet origin to Russia." It also proposes demanding reparations from Russia, including a reparations tax on Russian-owned enterprises in Latvia, ending residence permits for citizens of Russia and Belarus, stopping them from obtaining Latvian citizenship, and introducing criminal liability for "diminishing the significance of the Latvian language in the public space."

Party leader Raivis Zeltīts has argued that Latvia should seek to restore its claim to the former Abrene district if Russia were to collapse, and has criticized the 2007 Latvia–Russia border treaty as "treacherous" and contrary to Latvia's national interests, arguing that it abandoned Latvia's claims under the 1920 Latvian–Soviet Peace Treaty and failed to address the Soviet occupation and the continuity of the Latvian state.

== Election results ==
=== Legislative elections ===
Election	Party leader	Performance					Rank	Government
Election	Party leader	Votes	%	± pp	Seats	+/–	Rank	Government
2026	Raivis Zeltīts	10,669	1.35	New	0 / 100	New	11th	Extra-parliamentary
