= Žaneta Jaunzeme-Grende =

Latvian politician and businesswoman

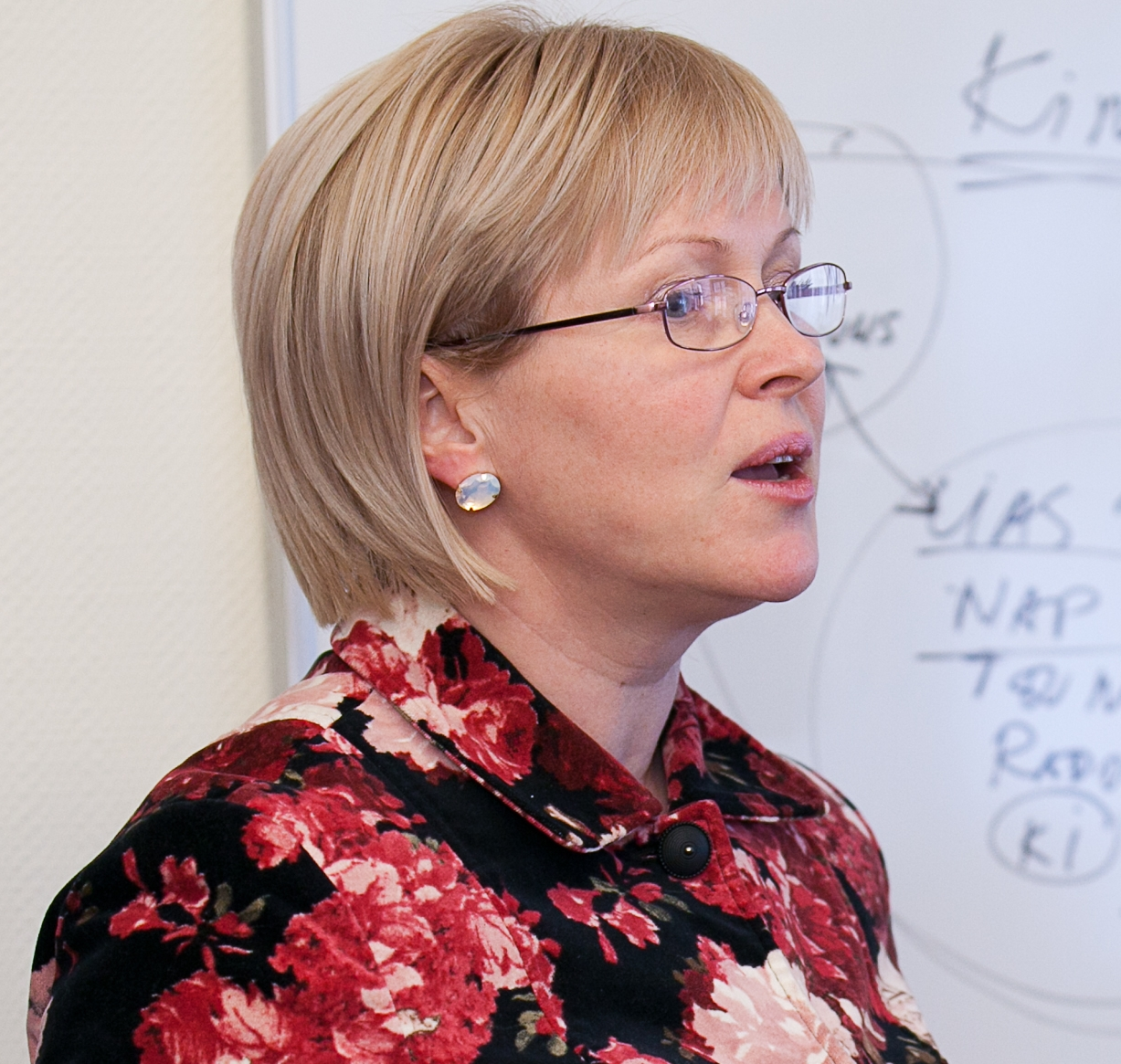

Minister for Culture of Latvia
- In office 25 October 2011 – 16 September 2013
- Prime Minister: Valdis Dombrovskis
- Preceded by: Sarmīte Ēlerte
- Succeeded by: Dace Melbārde

Personal details
- Born: 10 March 1964 (age 62) Riga, Latvian SSR
- Party: National Alliance
- Other political affiliations: All for Latvia! (2011)
- Spouse: Ants Grende
- Education: University of Latvia; Latvian Academy of Sport Education (1987); RISEBA University of Business, Arts and Technology
- Profession: Entrepreneur

Žaneta Jaunzeme-Grende (born Žaneta Akantjeva on 10 March 1964) is a Latvian politician and businesswoman. She is a member of the National Alliance, and former Minister for Culture in the Third Dombrovskis cabinet. She was President of the Latvian Chamber of Commerce from 2008 to 2011.

In 2011, Grende joined All for Latvia!. On September 16, 2013 she was fired from the position of Minister for Culture of Latvia by the Prime Minister Valdis Dombrovskis because of her conflict with the culture sector. She was subsequently replaced by Dace Melbārde.

She speaks Latvian, English, and Russian.
