= Raivis Zeltīts =

Latvian politician (born 1992)

Personal details
- Born: 21 March 1992 (age 34) Riga, Republic of Latvia
- Party: Rising Sun for Latvia (2025-present)
- Education: University of Latvia
- Profession: Politician, activist, writer

Raivis Zeltīts (born 21 March 1992) is a Latvian politician, national-conservative activist, and writer. From 2014 to 2020 he was the Secretary-General of the National Alliance, as well as board member and leader of its youth organization. He was elected to the Mārupe municipal council in the 2013 municipal elections and re-elected in 2017. He did not run for re-election in 2021. In 2020 he founded nationalist association "Austošā Saule" and was one of the founders of Rising Sun for Latvia party in 2025.

== Activities ==
Zeltīts has bachelor's degree in history. He is the author of many articles both in Latvian and English about nationalism, geopolitics, and the idea of Intermarium in today's Europe. Liberal news magazine New Eastern Europe has called Raivis Zeltits "a key promoter of identitaire ideology in Latvian politics" and writes that with the national-conservative news portal The New Nationalism "Zeltīts has created a political platform, linking the far right from the Baltic to the Black Sea". On 23 August 2017, Zeltīts' first book Par Nacionālu Valsti (On the Nation State) was published. It describes the ideas and tasks of Latvian nationalism in the 21st century in a systematic way. In 2019 Zeltits' book about Latvian national-conservative philosopher Pauls Jurevičs Dr. Pauls Jurevičs un latviešu tautas misija (Dr. Pauls Jurevičs and the mission of the Latvian nation) was published, focusing on the philosopher's critique on Marxism, the modern West, and the potential of "young" European nations in regeneration of the European civilization.

Raivis Zeltīts has also published several articles in the Latvian conservative intellectual portal Telos, writing on topics such as nationalism, demographic policy, immigration and political strategy.

In 2020, after resigning from the post of Secretary-General of the National Alliance party, Zeltīts established nationalist movement "Austošā Saule" ("Rising Sun"), which stands for "ethnic Latvian nationalism, democratic and economic self-determination of the nation and close cooperation with Lithuania (pan-Baltism) and other countries of the Intermarium region. A manifesto was published later, describing ideology of "National Democratism". The movement became known for its protests against Russian influence in Latvia. It organized actions opposing the Russian cultural center "Moscow house" and grain transit from Russia.

On 10 May 2022, Raivis Zeltīts became involved in a confrontation with pro-Russian activists who were celebrating the unsanctioned Victory Day events, as police moved in to disperse a gathering at the Riga monument to Soviet soldiers. On 23 August 2025, the political party Austošā Saule Latvijai was officially founded at the VEF Culture Palace, with Raivis Zeltīts elected chairman of board.

=== Contacts with the European far-right ===
In 2019, Raivis Zeltits' profile with the username "Latvian_Integralist" was found in the neo-fascist website Iron March leaks. Zeltīts has responded that he was 20 years old at the time of the postings and went to explain: "I have never concealed that I was more radical in the maximalism of my youth... I am aware that it casts a shadow over me and the party. (..) "I apologize to those close to me, supporters and to the National Alliance for this shadow." He also said that he was in favor of a democratic political system and that his more recent writings and activities underlined this, and that he would accept whatever decision the National Alliance came to with regard to the controversy.

Later investigative journalism show "De Facto" reported that at the end of 2014 Zeltīts, already as the party's Secretary-General, appeared on the online radio show "Voice of Albion" hosted by National Action supporter Paul Hickman. A few months later, in March 2015, the leader of National Action and administrator of Iron March Benjamin Raymond together with Hickman visited National Alliance's headquarters in Riga. Raymond was also seen participating at the Remembrance day of the Latvian legionnaires events alongside Zeltīts. Zeltīts denied having invited them or given them a tour of the party office, but knew the identity of the person who did, which he refused to reveal for "ethical reasons". Party chairman Raivis Dzintars when asked to comment, said that he had accepted Zeltīts' apology for the previous controversy, but dismissed the subsequent information from "De Facto" as "not relevant" to anyone.

== Views ==
Zeltits criticizes what he calls "Globalism", "Neo-Marxism", "International financial oligarchy" and multiculturalism as a "model that doesn’t work".

Zeltits has declared that he is pro European Union based on nation-states and Christian values. He views positively the increasing role of Poland in the region. He has stated that he is against any form of totalitarianism and doesn't believe in white nationalism, because Latvian "identity is multilayered and cannot be reduced to such categories".

He has condemned white nationalist terrorists and called them ""useful fools", because every time some radical does a crime, the system is acting against every critique of immigration, even the moderate one." At the same time, Zeltīts defends ethnic nationalism, as "foundation of state of Latvia, because it was founded within the borders of land inhabited by Latvians. (..) In Latvia first there was a nation and then the state was founded for self-determination of the nation. But this does not exclude the possibility for national minorities to participate in the life of the state, it only states the main goal of the state's existence, which is also enshrined in the preamble of the Constitution. (..) Civic nationalism can, of course, complement the ethnic version."

He states that family is not created by constitution or laws, but only recognized and defended by them, therefore he opposes new forms of family as a "social experiment".
