= Agnese Logina =

Latvian politician, art historian

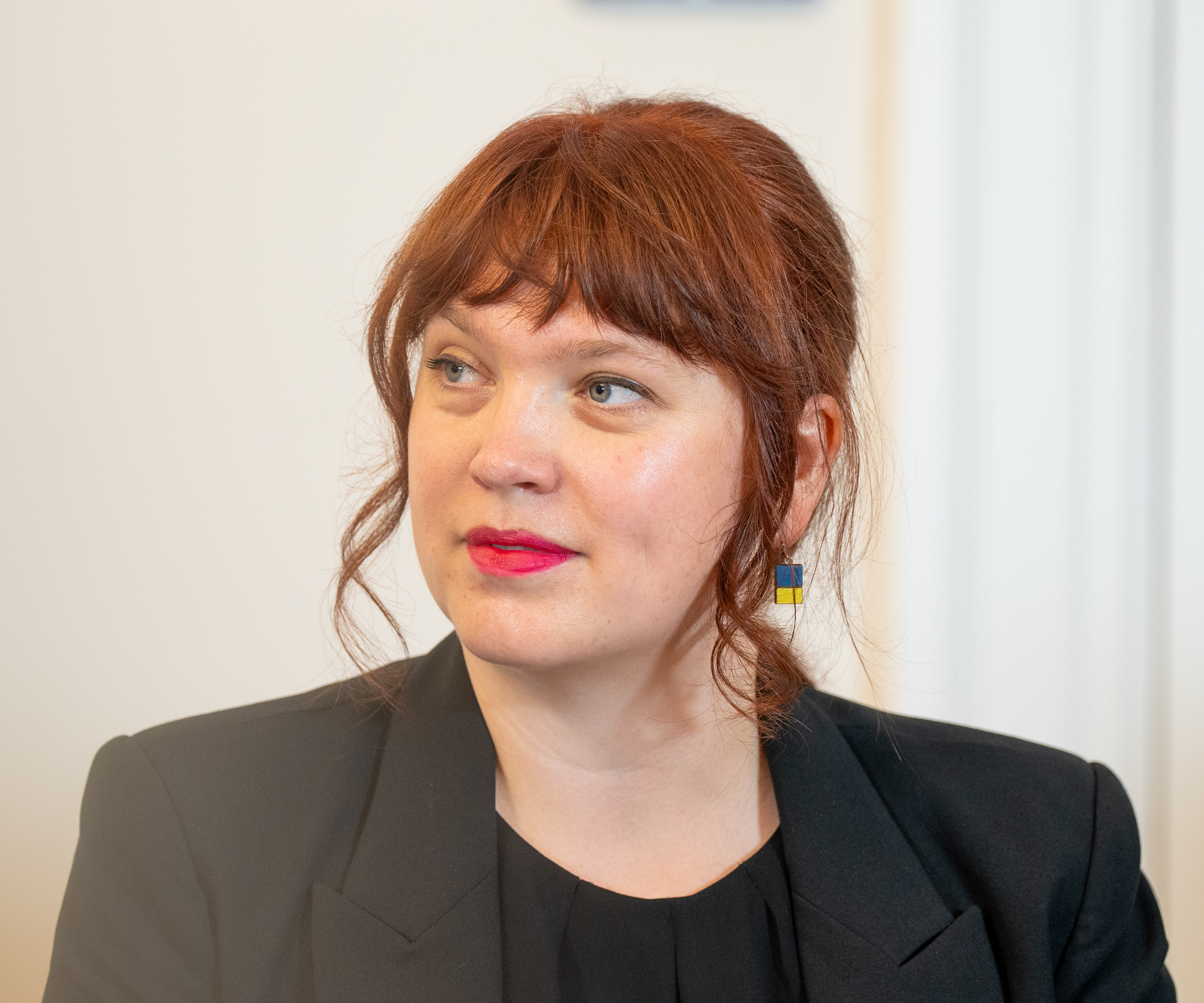
- Logina in 2023

Minister of Culture
- In office 15 September 2023 – 17 June 2024
- Prime Minister: Evika Siliņa
- Preceded by: Nauris Puntulis
- Succeeded by: Agnese Lāce

Member of Riga City Council
- In office 2 October 2020 – 15 September 2023
- Incumbent
- Assumed office 28 June 2024

Personal details
- Born: 25 June 1990 (age 36) Riga, Latvia
- Party: The Progressives (since 2017)
- Education: Amsterdam University College; Latvian Academy of Culture

Agnese Logina (born 25 June 1990) is a Latvian cultural researcher, film curator and critic, cultural policy expert and politician. She was the Minister of Culture of Latvia from September 2023 to June 2024.

She has been a member of the Riga City Council, lecturer in cultural theory at the Latvian Academy of Culture and head of the Riga Film Museum from 2022 to 2023.
