= Gaidis Bērziņš =

Latvian politician (born 1970)

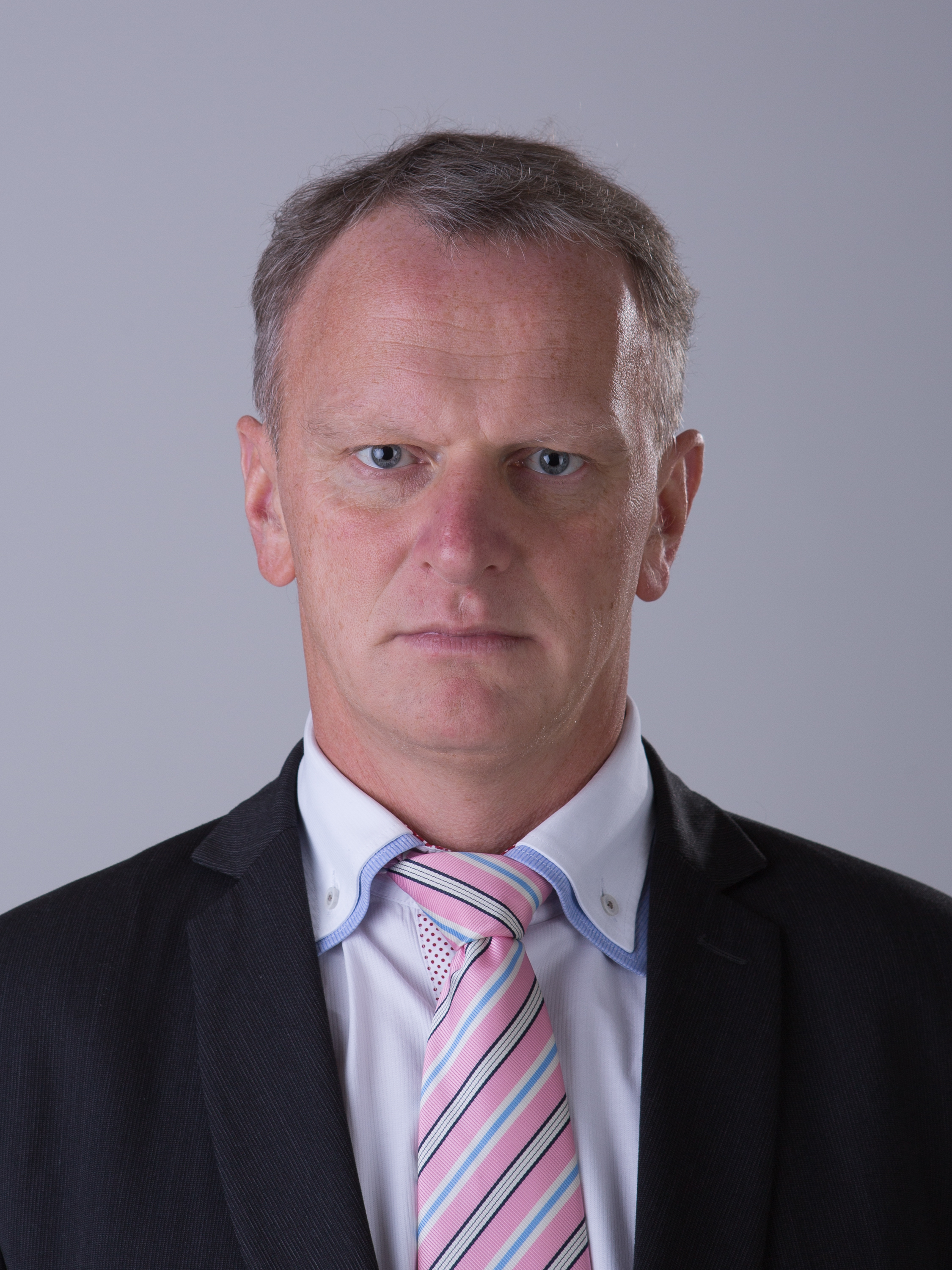
- Gaidis Bērziņš in 2014

Minister for Justice of Latvia
- In office 25 October 2011 – 21 June 2012
- Prime Minister: Valdis Dombrovskis
- Preceded by: Aigars Štokenbergs
- Succeeded by: Jānis Bordāns
- In office 7 November 2006 – 12 March 2009
- Prime Minister: Aigars Kalvītis (2006–07); Ivars Godmanis (2007–09)
- Preceded by: Guntars Grīnvalds
- Succeeded by: Mareks Segliņš

Co-chairman of the National Alliance
- Incumbent
- Assumed office 23 July 2011 Serving with Raivis Dzintars

Personal details
- Born: 20 October 1970 (age 55) (Soviet Union) Riga, Latvian SSR
- Party: National Alliance
- Other political affiliations: For Fatherland and Freedom/LNNK (until 2011)
- Spouse: Denēza Bērziņa
- Education: University of Latvia
- Profession: Jurist

Gaidis Bērziņš (born 20 October 1970 in Riga) is a Latvian politician, lawyer, and university lecturer in law. He is former Minister for Justice of Latvia and co-chair of the National Alliance, along with Raivis Dzintars.

== Politics ==
After the 2006 election, he was appointed the Minister for Justice, taking the office on 7 November 2006 and holding it until 12 March 2009. Bērziņš was elected to the 2010 election as one of two For Fatherland and Freedom/LNNK representatives on the joint National Alliance list that the party shared with All For Latvia!. When the National Alliance became a unitary party, Bērziņš became co-chair, along with Raivis Dzintars.

The 2011 election saw the National Alliance gain six seats, after which the party formed a centre-right coalition with Zatlers' Reform Party, and Unity. Bērziņš was appointed Minister for Justice once again. He took office on the 25 October 2011.
