= Agnese Lāce =

Latvian politician and researcher, former Minister of Culture

- Lāce in 2024

Minister of Culture
- In office 20 June 2024 – 28 May 2026
- Prime Minister: Evika Siliņa
- Preceded by: Agnese Logina
- Succeeded by: Nauris Puntulis

Personal details
- Born: 23 August 1987 (age 39) Talsi, Talsi district, Latvia
- Party: The Progressives (since 2023)
- Education: University of Latvia (BSc, MSc); University of Amsterdam/University of Deusto/Osnabrück University (MSc)

Agnese Lāce (born 23 August 1987 in Talsi) is a Latvian politician of The Progressives and researcher who served as Minister of Culture from 2024 until 2026. She was previously Parliamentary Secretary to the Minister of Culture from 2023 to 2024, and worked at Providus from 2016 to 2023.

== Biography ==
Born in Talsi in 1987, Lāce obtained a Bachelor in Political Science degree from the University of Latvia in 2009, upgrading it to a Masters in 2011, as well as a European joint MSc degree in Sociology from the University of Amsterdam, the University of Deusto and Osnabrück University in 2013.

Her first career post was at the Ministry of Foreign Affairs as a intern at the OSCE High Commissioner on National Minorities, led at the time by Latvian Ilze Brands-Kehris. Her previous experience also includes consultancy for the UN Refugee Agency and working as a researcher at the University of Latvia.
