= Karina Pētersone =

Latvian politician (born 1954)

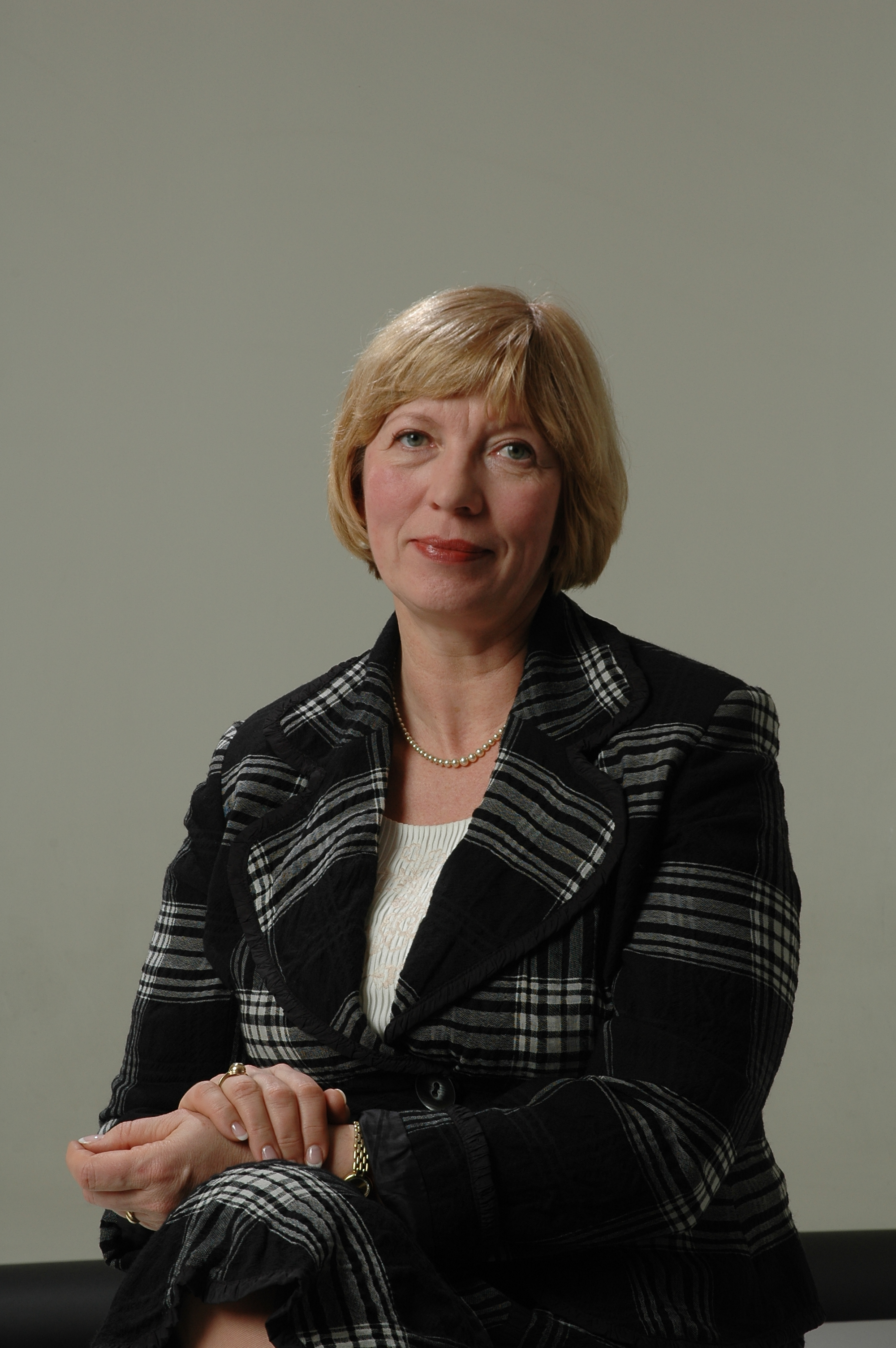

Minister of Culture of Latvia
- In office 26 November 1998 – 7 November 2002
- Prime Minister: Vilis Krištopāns; Andris Šķēle
- Preceded by: Ramona Umblija
- Succeeded by: Inguna Rībena

Personal details
- Born: 19 September 1954 (age 72) Riga, Latvian SSR
- Party: LPP/LC
- Other political affiliations: Latvian Way
- Education: University of Latvia
- Profession: Philologist

Karina Pētersone (born 19 September 1954 in Riga, Latvia) is a Latvian politician. She was the Minister of Culture of Latvia from 26 November 1998 to 7 November 2002. She is now a member of the LPP/LC and a deputy of the 9th Saeima (Latvian Parliament). She began her current term in parliament on 7 November 2006. Since 2024, she is Director of Support Foundation of the Latvian National Library.

Pētersone speaks Latvian, Russian and English, and has translated several political essays, novels and plays.
