= Nauris Puntulis =

Latvian politician

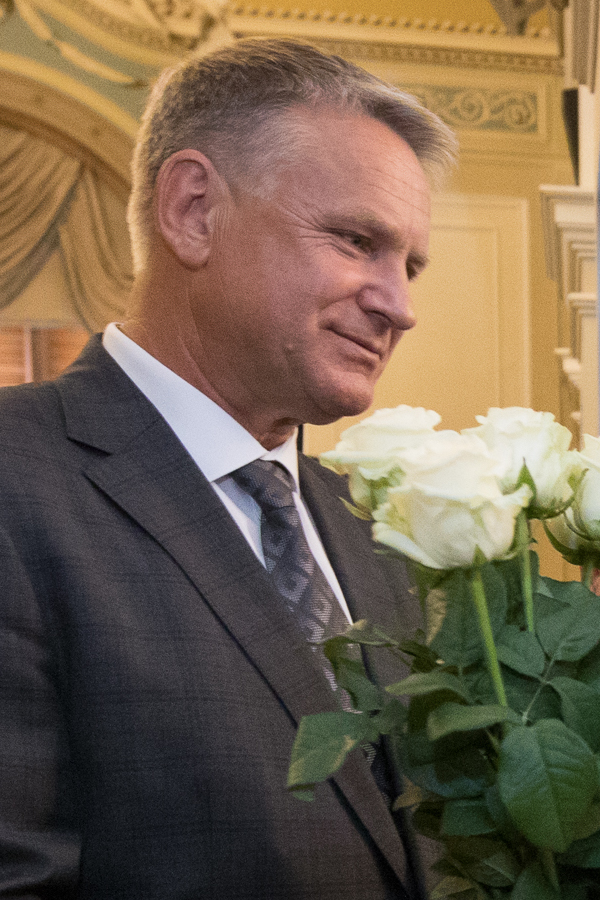
- Nauris Puntulis in 2019

Member of the Saeima
- Incumbent
- Assumed office November 1, 2022

Minister of Culture
- In office May 28, 2026
- President: Edgars Rinkēvičs
- Prime Minister: Andris Kulbergs
- Preceded by: Agnese Lāce
- In office July 8, 2019 – September 15, 2023
- President: Edgars Rinkēvičs; Egils Levits
- Prime Minister: Krišjānis Kariņš
- Preceded by: Dace Melbārde
- Succeeded by: Agnese Logina

Personal details
- Born: July 17, 1961 (age 65) Tiņģere, Latvian SSR, Soviet Union
- Party: National Alliance

Nauris Puntulis (born 17 July 1961) is a Latvian singer and politician. From July 8, 2019 to September 15, 2023, he served as the Minister of Culture in the Kariņš cabinet. He is affiliated with the National Alliance party. He was appointed for his second term as Culture Minister in 2022. His term ceased when the Second Kariņš cabinet fell. On 28 May 2026, he was again appointed Minister of Culture.
