= Restitution (theology) =

Idea in moral theology

Restitution in moral theology and soteriology signifies an act of commutative justice by which exact reparation as far as possible is made for an injury that has been done to another. In the teaching of certain Christian denominations, restitution is an essential part in salvation.

== Methodism ==
In Methodism, the way of salvation includes conviction, repentance, restitution, faith, justification, regeneration and adoption, which is followed by sanctification. Restitution is delineated in Methodist catechisms, such as the following:

What do we mean by restitution?

If we have wrongfully taken anything from others, or mistreated them in any way, we must make it right by restoring as far as possible.

Is restitution taught in the Bible?

Yes. "Them is shall be, because he hath sinned, and is guilty, that he shall restore that which he took violently away,...and give it unto him to whom it appertaineth" (Lev. 6:4, 5).
Zacchaeus said: "Behold, Lord, ...if I have taken any thing from any man by false accusation, I restore him fourfold" (Luke 19:8).

Restitution occurs subsequent to repentance and is seen as the "essential preparation for saving faith".

== Reformed ==
In the Reformed view, "restitution is important because it shows how repentance and conversion always produce tangible results." The example of Zacchaeus in the Bible demonstrates "that becoming a disciple of Christ meant restoring to others what has been taken". Restitution occurs subsequent to repentance.

== See also ==
- Atonement in Christianity
- Indemnity
- Reparation (disambiguation)
- Restitution
- Restoration
- Restorative justice
