= Visvaldis Lācis =

Latvian publicist, linguist, historian, and politician

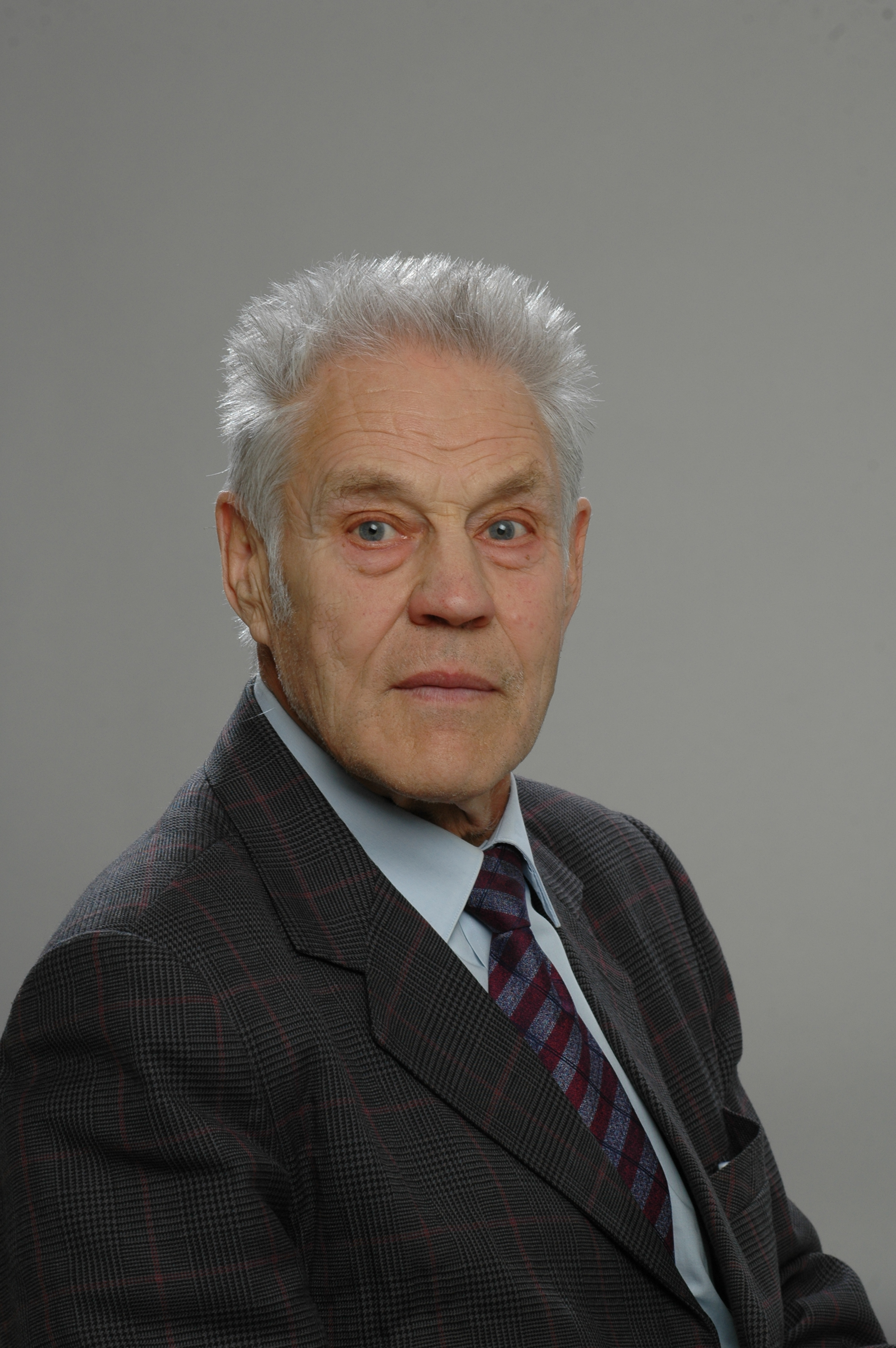
- Visvaldis Lācis in 2006

Member of the Saeima

Personal details
- Born: 12 March 1924 Valmiera, Latvia
- Died: 18 April 2020 (aged 96) Madona Municipality, Latvia
- Party: LNNK; Mūsu zeme (1993–?); Latvian Green Party (2005–2007); All for Latvia! (2010–2011)
- Spouse: Viktorija Lāce
- Education: 1st Moscow State Pedagogical Institute of Foreign Languages
- Profession: Linguist, publicist, historian

Visvaldis Bruno Lācis (12 March 1924 – 18 April 2020) was a Latvian publicist, linguist, historian, and politician, one of the leaders of the Singing Revolution, and a member of the 9th Saeima and 10th Saeima. He published more than 300 articles and 10 books on Latvian and world history and politics.

== Biography ==
Visvaldis Lācis was born in 1924 in Valmiera to the family of Eižens Lācis, who until 1923 was the head of the secret political police. His father was also a veteran of the Latvian counterintelligence service during the Latvian War of Independence.

Lācis studied at the Riga Classical Gymnasium. In 1943, he was drafted into the Latvian Legion, serving in the 44th regiment of the 19th Grenadier Division of the SS. He completed officer training courses and became a lieutenant. He fought in the Courland Pocket and was wounded twice. After the war, he was placed in Soviet filtration camps.

After his release, he continued his studies at the Riga Rainis Evening School. In 1949, he began studying at the Latvia University of Life Sciences and Technologies but was expelled for independent thinking. He married in 1952. In 1957, he started studying at the University of Latvia, but in 1961, he was again expelled. Later, he enrolled in the 1st Moscow State Pedagogical Institute of Foreign Languages by correspondence, graduating in 1965 with a degree in higher education at the age of 41. Lācis worked at the Vestiena collective farm.

He owned a private library, which after his death became part of the Misiņš Library of the Academic Library of the University of Latvia collection, where it is known as the "Visvaldis Lācis Reading Room".

Visvaldis Lācis' grandsons include journalist Mārtiņš Lācis and basketball player, sports journalist, and organizer Reinis Lācis.

=== Political career ===
At the start of the Third Awakening, Lācis, along with Ints Cālītis, Juris Ziemelis, Jānis Čakstiņš, and Imants Kulinskis, established the temporary leadership of the Informal Latvian Popular Front. In 1988, he became involved with the Latvian Popular Front (LTF) and was elected to its board. He became known for his speeches and publications. In 1991, he served as the chairman of the Latvian National Independence Movement (LNNK).

In 1993, Lācis was one of the founders of the "Mūsu Zeme" party and unsuccessfully ran for the 5th Saeima.

In 1997, the Kurzemes District Court of Riga ruled that Lācis had not collaborated with the KGB or acted as an informant.

In 2002, Lācis participated in founding the party "All for Latvia!", though he did not become a member. Before the 2003 Latvian European Union membership referendum, he actively campaigned against Latvia joining the European Union. In 2005, he joined the Latvian Green Party and was elected to the 9th Saeima on the Union of Greens and Farmers list. In October 2007, he left the Green Party and the ZZS Saeima faction, opposing the dismissal of Aleksejs Loskutovs from the Corruption Prevention and Combating Bureau (KNAB) and the faction's pressure in that vote.

After leaving ZZS, he worked as an independent deputy. In the 2009 European Parliament elections, Lācis was the top candidate on the Visu Latvijai! list without being a party member. However, the list failed to meet the electoral threshold, and he was not elected. In April 2010, he joined Visu Latvijai! and in the summer announced his candidacy in the 10th Saeima elections from the National Alliance list. He also joined the joint 9th Saeima faction of both political forces. In October, he was elected to the 10th Saeima. In 2011, Lācis left All for Latvia! and the VL-TB/LNNK Saeima faction.

=== Sports ===
In September 2016, at the age of 92, Lācis participated in the Valmiera marathon and completed the full marathon distance for the first time in his life with a time of 8 hours and 14 minutes. In September 2017, at the age of 93, he ran the Berlin Marathon, becoming the oldest participant in the race.

== Awards and honors ==
- 1995 – Awarded the Order of the Three Stars.
- Honorary Doctor of the Latvian Academy of Sciences.
