= List of ministers of culture of Latvia =

The minister of culture of Latvia is a member of the Cabinet of Ministers of Latvia, and is the political leader of the Ministry of Culture of Latvia. Nauris Puntulis is the current minister since 28 May 2026.

== List of ministers of culture ==
=== Republic of Latvia ===
	Name	Took office	Left office	Party
1	Raimonds Pauls	16 May 1990	3 August 1993	Independent
Ministry merged into the Ministry of Education and Science, State Minister of Culture: Raimonds Pauls (3 August 1993 - 20 September 1993), Jānis Dripe (20 September 1993 - 19 September 1994)
2	Jānis Dripe	19 September 1994	21 December 1995	Latvian Way
3	Ojārs Spārītis	21 December 1995	22 July 1996	Latvian Farmers' Union
4	Rihards Pīks	12 August 1996	20 June 1997	Latvian Farmers' Union
5	Ramona Umblija	7 August 1997	26 November 1998	Latvian Farmers' Union
6	Karina Pētersone	26 November 1998	7 November 2002	Latvian Way
7	Inguna Rībena	7 November 2002	9 March 2004	New Era Party
8	Helēna Demakova	9 March 2004	12 January 2009	People's Party
9	Ints Dālderis	12 March 2009	3 November 2010	People's Party (until 19 March 2010)
9	Ints Dālderis	12 March 2009	3 November 2010	Independent (from 19 March 2010 to 28 June 2010)
9	Ints Dālderis	12 March 2009	3 November 2010	New Era Party (from 28 June 2010)
10	Sarmīte Ēlerte	3 November 2010	25 October 2011	Civic Union (Unity since 6 August 2011)
11	Žaneta Jaunzeme-Grende	25 October 2011	16 September 2013	National Alliance
12	Dace Melbārde	31 October 2013	4 July 2019	Independent (until February 2014)
12	Dace Melbārde	31 October 2013	4 July 2019	National Alliance (from February 2014)
13	Nauris Puntulis	8 July 2019	15 September 2023	National Alliance
14	Agnese Logina	15 September 2023	17 June 2024	The Progressives
15	Agnese Lāce	20 June 2024	28 May 2028	
16	Nauris Puntulis	28 May 2026	present	National Alliance "All for Latvia!" – "For Fatherland and Freedom/LNNK"

=== Latvian SSR during the Soviet occupation of Latvia ===
	Name	Took office	Left office	Party
1	Jānis Ostrovs	1953	1958	Latvian Communist Party
2	Voldemārs Kalpiņš	1958	1961, December	Latvian Communist Party
3	Vladimirs Kaupužs	1962	1986	Latvian Communist Party
4	Jāzeps Barkāns	1986	1988	Latvian Communist Party
5	Ivars Ķezbers	1988	1988	Latvian Communist Party
5	Raimonds Pauls (As chair of the State Committee for Culture)	1989	1990 (1993)	Independent
