= Dace Melbārde =

Latvian politician (born 1971)

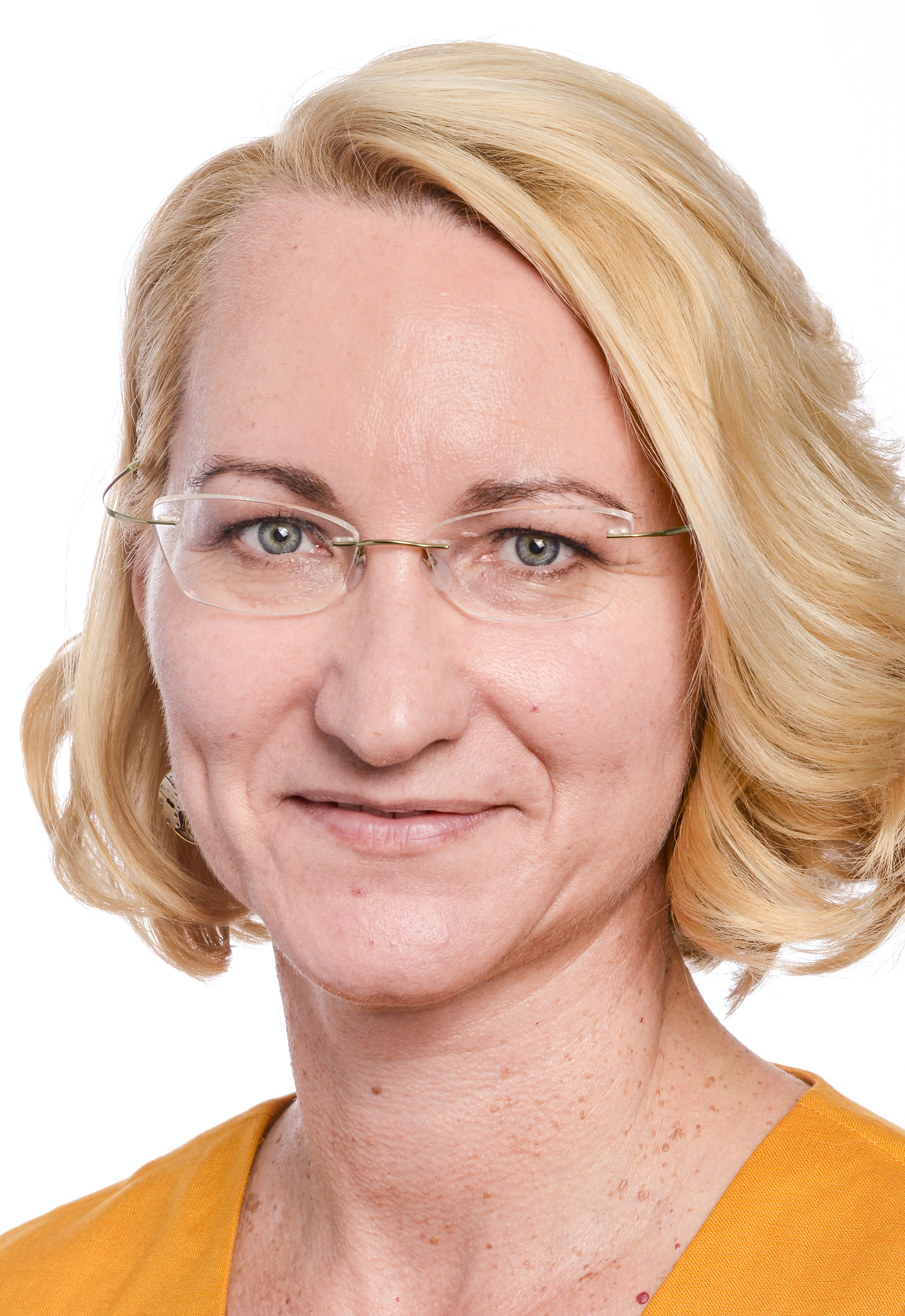

Member of the European Parliament
- In office 19 June 2019 – May 2024

Minister of Education and Science
- In office 6 March 2025 – 28 May 2026
- Prime Minister: Evika Siliņa
- Preceded by: Anda Čakša
- Succeeded by: Ilze Indriksone

Minister of Culture
- In office 31 October 2013 – 18 June 2019
- Prime Minister: Valdis Dombrovskis; Laimdota Straujuma; Māris Kučinskis; Krišjānis Kariņš
- Preceded by: Žaneta Jaunzeme-Grende
- Succeeded by: Nauris Puntulis

Personal details
- Born: 3 April 1971 (age 55) Rīga, Latvian SSR, Soviet Union (now Latvia)
- Party: New Unity (2022–present)
- Other political affiliations: National Alliance (2014–2022); European Conservatives and Reformists (2019–2024)
- Education: University of Latvia; Latvian Academy of Culture

Dace Melbārde (born 3 April 1971) is a Latvian politician who served as the Minister of Education and Science from 2025 to 2026. She is a member of New Unity, having defected from the National Alliance in 2022. She previously served as the minister of culture from 2013 to 2019. In May 2019, representing the political party National Alliance, she was elected as a Member of the European Parliament, where she joined the European Conservatives and Reformists group.

== Biography ==
She studied at Valmiera's 1st Secondary school (1989), University of Latvia school of history and philosophy (Bachelor's degree in History Sciences, 1994), Latvian Academy of Culture (Master's degree in cultural theory, administration and history speciality, 1996) and the University of Latvia's School of Economics and Management (Master's degree in company management, 2001).

During the period from 1992 to 1995, Melbarde was the chief specialist of education and information work at the Latvian War Museum. From 1994 to 1996, led a cultural centre at the Latvian Police College. From 1996 to 1999, she was deputy director of the National Youth Initiative Centre. Then, until 2004, she was general secretary at UNESCO's National Commission of Latvia. From 2003 to 2005, Chairman of the Council for the Conservation and Development of the Historical Centre of Riga. From 2004 to 2006, Member of the Council of Ministers Education for All.

Former Under-Secretary of State on Cultural Policy Issues of the Latvian Ministry of Culture from 2004 to 2009. During the period 2005-2009, member of the artistic council of the Latvian Song and Dance Festival. The following two years have been the Country Manager of the British Council Latvia. In 2011, she became Director of the State Centre for Arts Education and Intangible Heritage. In 2013, Melbarde became Minister for culture of the Republic of Latvia she held this position till 2019 when she was elected as a Member of the European Parliament.

In 1999 and 2000, awarded by the Ministry of Education and Science of the Republic of Latvia for the Contribution to the Development of the Youth Policy in Latvia. In 2002, awarded by Ministry of Foreign Affairs of the Republic of Latvia for the Achievements in Building of the Latvian State. In 2005, was the finalist of the World Competition „The Outstanding Young Persons” organized by the Junior Chamber International, and Winner of the National Competition in the nomination “Achievements in Culture”. Received award by the Speaker of the Parliament of the Republic of Latvia for the Contribution to Organising the Latvian School Children and Youth Song and Dance Celebration in 2005. Awarded with the Spīdola Award by the National Cultural Foundation for the Excellence in the Management of Culture in 2005. In 2013, awarded with the Order of the Three Stars 4th class.

== Political action ==
Following the resignation of Žaneta Jaunzeme-Grende in October 2013, Melbarde was confirmed as a non-party representative of the Latvian Minister for Culture in the government of Valdis Dombrovskis.

In total, Melbarde has worked as Minister for Culture in five governments:

- 31 October 2013 - Minister for Culture of the Republic in the government led by Valdis Dombrovskis
- 22 January 2014 - Minister for Culture of the Republic in the government led by Laimdota Straujuma
- 5 November 2014 - Minister for Culture of the Republic in the government led by Laimdota Straujuma
- 11 February 2016 - Minister for Culture of the Republic in the government led by Māris Kučinskis
- 23 January 2019 - Minister for Culture of the Republic in the government led by Arturs Krišjānis Kariņš

She joined the political party National Alliance in February 2014. The same year she was elected to the parliament of the Republic of Latvia, the Saeima. She was re-elected to the Saeima at the next term as well. On 22 August 2022 she left the National Alliance and joined New Unity.

On 6 March 2025, she was confirmed as Minister of Education and Science, replacing Anda Čakša.
