= Jānis Vitenbergs =

Latvian politician

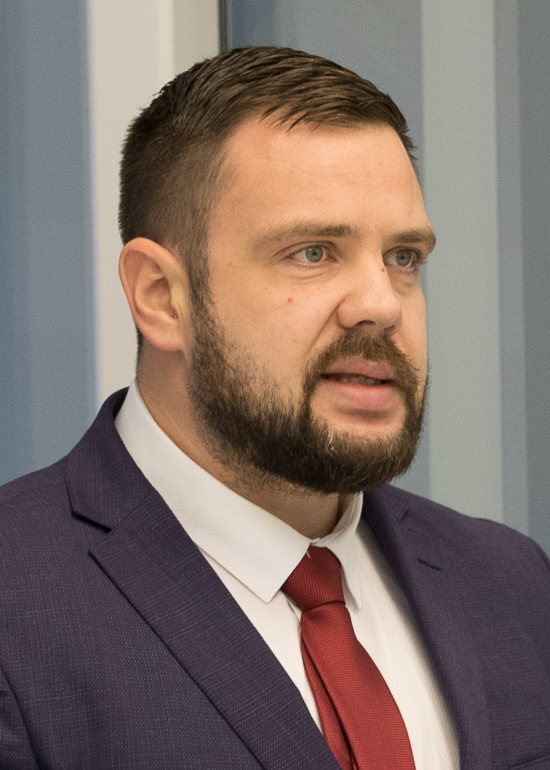
- Vitenbergs in 2019

Minister of Economics of Latvia
- In office June 3, 2021 – May 18, 2022
- Preceded by: Kaspars Gerhards (acting)
- Succeeded by: Kaspars Gerhards (acting)
- In office April 2, 2020 – May 14, 2021
- Preceded by: Ralfs Nemiro
- Succeeded by: Kaspars Gerhards (acting)

Personal details
- Born: May 8, 1985 (age 41)
- Party: KPV LV (2018-2021); National Alliance (2021-)
- Occupation: Politician

Jānis Vitenbergs (born May 8, 1985) is a Latvian politician, who served as the Minister of Economics of the Republic of Latvia from April 2020 until May 2021 and June 2021 until May 2022 Prior to this, he was the chairman of the Saeima national economic, rural, environmental, and regional policy committee.

== Education ==
In 2005, he graduated from the Latvian College of Culture as a cultural tourism guide. In 2008, he obtained a Bachelor's degree in tourism at the University of Liepaja.

== Career ==
In 2018, he was elected to the 13th Saeima on the KPV LV party list. In April 2021, he left KPV LV and joined the National Alliance.
