= All for Latvia! =

Latvian political party

All for Latvia Visu Latvijai!
- Co-chairman: Imants Parādnieks; Raivis Dzintars
- Founded: 14 January 2006
- Dissolved: 24 January 2014
- Merged into: National Alliance
- Headquarters: Riga
- Ideology: Nationalism; Right-wing populism; Social conservatism; Euroscepticism
- Political position: Radical right
- Colours: Maroon

Website
- visulatvijai.lv

All for Latvia! (Latvian: Visu Latvijai! (VL!)) was a populist radical right political party in Latvia led by Raivis Dzintars and Imants Parādnieks. Originating in 2000 as a youth movement, it was formalised as a non-governmental organization in 2002 and then transformed into a political party in 2006. All for Latvia! entered an electoral alliance with For Fatherland and Freedom/LNNK in 2010 before initiating a merger with the latter into the National Alliance in 2011, which was completed in 2014.

== History ==
=== Youth movement (2000–2002) ===
All for Latvia! emerged as a radical nationalist grassroots movement in 2000, relying on the mobilisation of youth activists and symbolic protest actions. This form of activism has been noted as unusual in Latvia, where parties typically had limited membership and ideology, and it functioned as a means of attracting media attention.

The movement was strongly shaped by its founder, Raivis Dzintars, who became politically active while still in secondary school after an unsuccessful attempt to join the youth wing of For Fatherland and Freedom/LNNK. All for Latvia! made its first public appearance with a small demonstration on 1 October 2000, which generated significant media attention. In its early phase, All for Latvia! functioned primarily as a youth-driven nationalist movement within a fragmented field of small nationalist organisations, with activity centred on symbolic demonstrations and media-oriented protest actions designed to increase visibility and influence public debate.

In 2001, five members of All For Latvia! staged a protest before the opening of an exhibition of humorous artistic works on Kārlis Ulmanis titled "Ulmanis in Our Hearts" organised by Art Academy of Latvia students, which All For Latvia! denounced as "a mockery of Ulmanis and desecration of Latvian symbols."

=== Non-governmental organization (2002–2006) ===
In late 2002, following internal controversies, All for Latvia! underwent a significant reorganization, expelling some of its members, broadening membership beyond its original youth base, publicly distancing itself from extremism and ethnic supremacism, and adopting a more disciplined political strategy while continuing to employ symbolic activism.

In 2005, All for Latvia! held a demonstration outside the Russian Embassy in which it burned the flag of the Soviet Union and called for Russia to acknowledge the Soviet occupation of the Baltic states. It also publicly supported the Remembrance Day of the Latvian Legionnaires, strongly opposed Latvia's first Riga Pride parade and held a memorial service at the monument to pre-war leader Kārlis Ulmanis, marking the anniversary of his 1934 coup d'état and consolidation of power.

=== Political party (2006–2014) ===
On 14 January 2006, All for Latvia! held its founding congress and was established as a political party, entering an already fragmented right-wing party landscape. At the congress, Raivis Dzintars called for all nationalist forces in Latvia to unite for that year's parliamentary elections, with the aim of ensuring that political power remained in the hands of Latvians "forever". The event was also attended by a number of other politicians and public figures from the Latvian right, including Kārlis Šadurskis, Juris Dobelis, Aleksandrs Kiršteins, and writer Visvaldis Lācis.

All for Latvia! continued to gradually build up its support through high-profile public demonstrations and an increasingly critical, populist stance toward the political elite. This included protests outside the Latvian parliament during debates on the Latvian–Russian border treaty, in which activists stood in winter shirtless with the names of Latvian towns and villages that Latvia legally renounced to Russia written on their torsos. Despite growing recognition, the party failed to surpass the 5% electoral threshold in the 2006 parliamentary election, which has been partially attributed to limited financial resources and weaker organizational capacity compared to established parties.

In 2007, following Estonia's relocation of the Bronze Soldier monument in Tallinn, All for Latvia! called for a public debate on the future of the Victory Monument in Riga, arguing that the monument symbolized the Soviet occupation of Latvia and was incompatible with the state's interpretation of the Second World War. Party chairman Raivis Dzintars urged the Baltic states to take coordinated action in addressing Soviet-era monuments, however, the proposal received little support from mainstream Latvian politicians, including members of other nationalist parties, who argued that any discussion of relocating the monument would be premature and could provoke tensions.

==== Part of an electoral alliance (2010–2011) ====
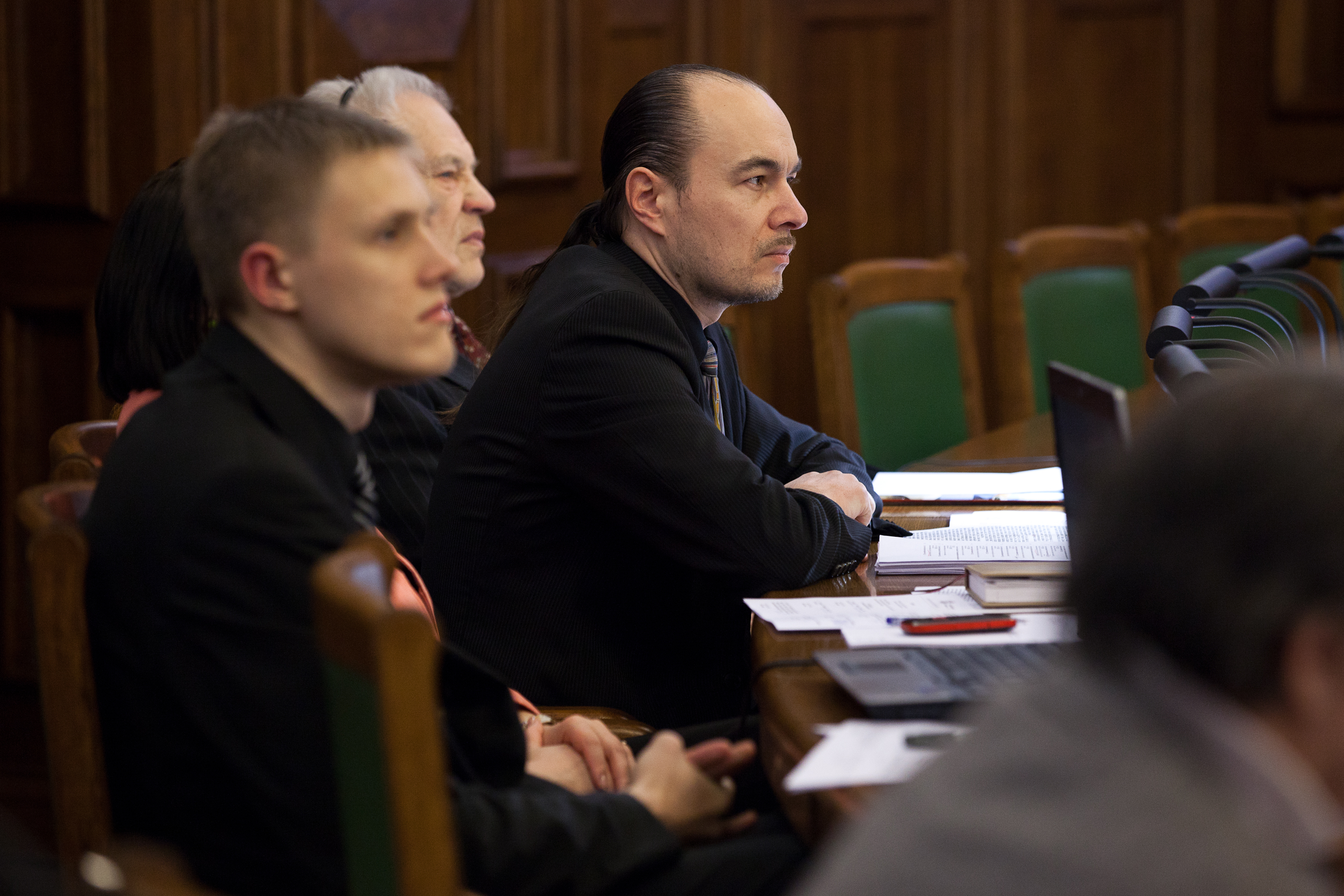
All for Latvia! deputees Jānis Dombrava, Visvaldis Lācis and Imants Parādnieks (from left to right) at a Saeima session on 3 March 2011

Ahead of the 2010 parliamentary election, All for Latvia! formed an electoral alliance with the more-established national-conservative For Fatherland and Freedom/LNNK (TB/LNNK), creating the National Alliance. TB/LNNK had increasingly weak polling support but retained a strong network of financial sponsors and governing experience built up through participation in national and municipal coalitions, while All for Latvia! contributed youth, activist energy, and a populist radical right rhetoric without governing experience.

Both parties were excluded from the Unity electoral alliance formed by Civic Union, New Era Party, and Society for Political Change, which chose to run separately from All for Latvia! and For Fatherland and Freedom/LNNK, citing ideological differences, while leaving open the possibility of post-election cooperation.

At the 2010 parliamentary election, All for Latvia! members received six out of the eight seats the National Alliance won. Unity invited the electoral alliance to join the coalition, but the offer was withdrawn a few days later after the Society for Political Change, one of the parties making up Unity, vetoed the option.

==== Merger into National Alliance (2011–2014) ====
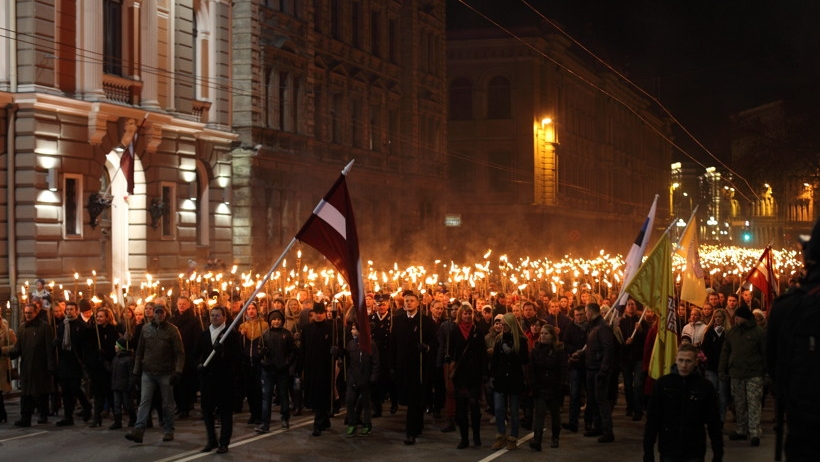
18th November Torch Procession in 2013, originally organised by All for Latvia! and later taken over by the National Alliance, with All for Latvia! leader Raivis Dzintars carrying the flag of Latvia at the front

On 23 July 2011, All for Latvia! and TB/LNNK voted to merge and form the National Alliance.

In April 2013, All for Latvia! officially established cooperation ties with the Russian National Democratic Alliance.

On 23 August 2013, marking the 25th anniversary of the Baltic Way, All for Latvia! together with Estonian Conservative People's Party and Lithuanian Nationalist and Republican Union signed the Bauska Declaration pledging to promote a "new national awakening" among the Baltic peoples, emphasizing national sovereignty over supranational institutions, opposing immigration and multiculturalism, condemning Russian imperialism, and calling for compensation for damages resulting from the Soviet occupation.

== Ideology ==
All for Latvia! has been described as radically nationalist with the stated goal of a "Latvian Latvia – an independent country governed by Latvian values (the Latvian language, culture and political will), one in which residents are brought together by selfless work on behalf of the nation and the fatherland." The party's 2006 campaign short programme emphasised the view that the right of the Latvian people to enjoy full lives in Latvia, to speak Latvian language and to specify their future was under threat due to loss of political power, claiming that the country might be "taken over by pro-Russian forces which are hostile to Latvia."

The programme set out goals of ensuring political power for Latvians, establishing Latvian as the language of instruction in all state-financed schools, defining Latvian as the sole language in both the public and private spheres, restricting Latvian citizenship to persons deemed loyal to Latvia, and encouraging the emigration of those considered hostile to the state.

The party has also been characterised as nativist, socially conservative and populist, portraying itself as different from other, "corrupt" political actors. In its election campaign, the party visited rural Latvian towns and villages, often by horse and cart, claiming that these areas were where the "real" Latvians lived. The party has also been noted as having a strong militarist component, with its party newspaper featuring images of leading members in military uniforms, and the party advocating the expansion of the role and activities of the National Guard.

Latvian political scientist Nils Muižnieks described "All for Latvia!" in 2001, when it was still a new youth movement, as "racist" and noted that they advocated for Latvia's "voluntary decolonization" while simultaneously rejecting National Socialism and fascism as "foreign to the Latvian people". In April 2013, the Riga Regional Court ordered Alexander Mirsky, a Member of the European Parliament from Harmony Centre, to pay 1,000 lats in damages to National Alliance co-chairmen Gaidis Bērziņš and Raivis Dzintars after ruling that Mirsky's reference to National Alliance members as "fascists" was defamatory.

== Election results ==
=== Legislative elections ===
Election	Party leader	Performance					Rank	Government
Election	Party leader	Votes	%	± pp	Seats	+/–	Rank	Government
2006	Raivis Dzintars	13,469	1.48	New	0 / 100	New	10th	Extra-parliamentary
2010 (Note: National Alliance won 8 seats; 6 went to All for Latvia! and 2 to For Fatherland and Freedom/LNNK)	Raivis Dzintars	74,029	7.67	▲6.19	8 / 100	▲8	4th	Opposition

=== European Parliament elections ===
Election	List leader	Votes	%	Seats	+/–	EP Group
2009	Raivis Dzintars	22,240	2.81 (#9)	0 / 8	New	–

=== Riga City Council ===
Election	Party leader	Performance					Rank	Government
Election	Party leader	Votes	%	± pp	Seats	+/–	Rank	Government
2009	Raivis Dzintars	4,523	1.87	New	0 / 60	New	10th	Extra-councilary
