= National Alliance (Latvia) =

Political party in Latvia

National Alliance Nacionālā apvienība
- Abbreviation: NA
- Chairwoman: Ilze Indriksone
- Founder: Roberts Zīle
- Founded: 4 July 2010; 16 years ago (electoral alliance); 23 July 2011; 15 years ago (party)
- Merger of: All for Latvia!; TB/LNNK
- Headquarters: 2nd floor, 4-1B Torna Street, Riga LV-1050
- Newspaper: Nacionālā Neatkarība
- Youth wing: "Youth for Latvia" (Jaunieši Latvijai)
- Membership (2026): ▲1,123
- Ideology: National conservatism; Economic liberalism; Soft Euroscepticism; Historical: Right-wing populism
- Political position: Right-wing
- European affiliation: European Conservatives and Reformists Party
- European Parliament group: European Conservatives and Reformists Group
- International affiliation: International Democracy Union
- Colours: Carmine; Gold
- Saeima: 10 / 100
- European Parliament: 2 / 9
- Government of Latvia: 5 / 14
- Riga City Council: 10 / 60
- Mayors: 5 / 43

Website
- nacionalaapvieniba.lv

The National Alliance (Latvian: Nacionālā apvienība, NA), officially the National Alliance "All for Latvia!" – "For Fatherland and Freedom/LNNK" (Latvian: Nacionālā apvienība "Visu Latvijai!" – "Tēvzemei un Brīvībai"/LNNK), is a national-conservative and economically liberal political party in Latvia.

It was formed as an electoral alliance for the 2010 Latvian parliamentary election between the For Fatherland and Freedom/LNNK and All for Latvia! parties. It won eight seats, placing it fourth among all parties. In July 2011, it merged into a single political party under the leadership of Gaidis Bērziņš and Raivis Dzintars. In the 2014 Latvian parliamentary election, it again increased its seats to seventeen, and entered a centre-right coalition, along with Unity and the Union of Greens and Farmers under Prime Minister Laimdota Straujuma.

It has participated in every government of Latvia from the 2011 Latvian parliamentary election until the Siliņa cabinet to prevent Harmony Centre from leading the coalition. It is also a member of the European Conservatives and Reformists Party (ECR) and its two MEPs, Roberts Zīle and Rihards Kols, sit in the ECR group in the European Parliament. The party controls the town and city governments of Ogre, Bauska, Smiltene, Sigulda, and Talsi.

== History ==
=== As an electoral alliance (2010–2011) ===
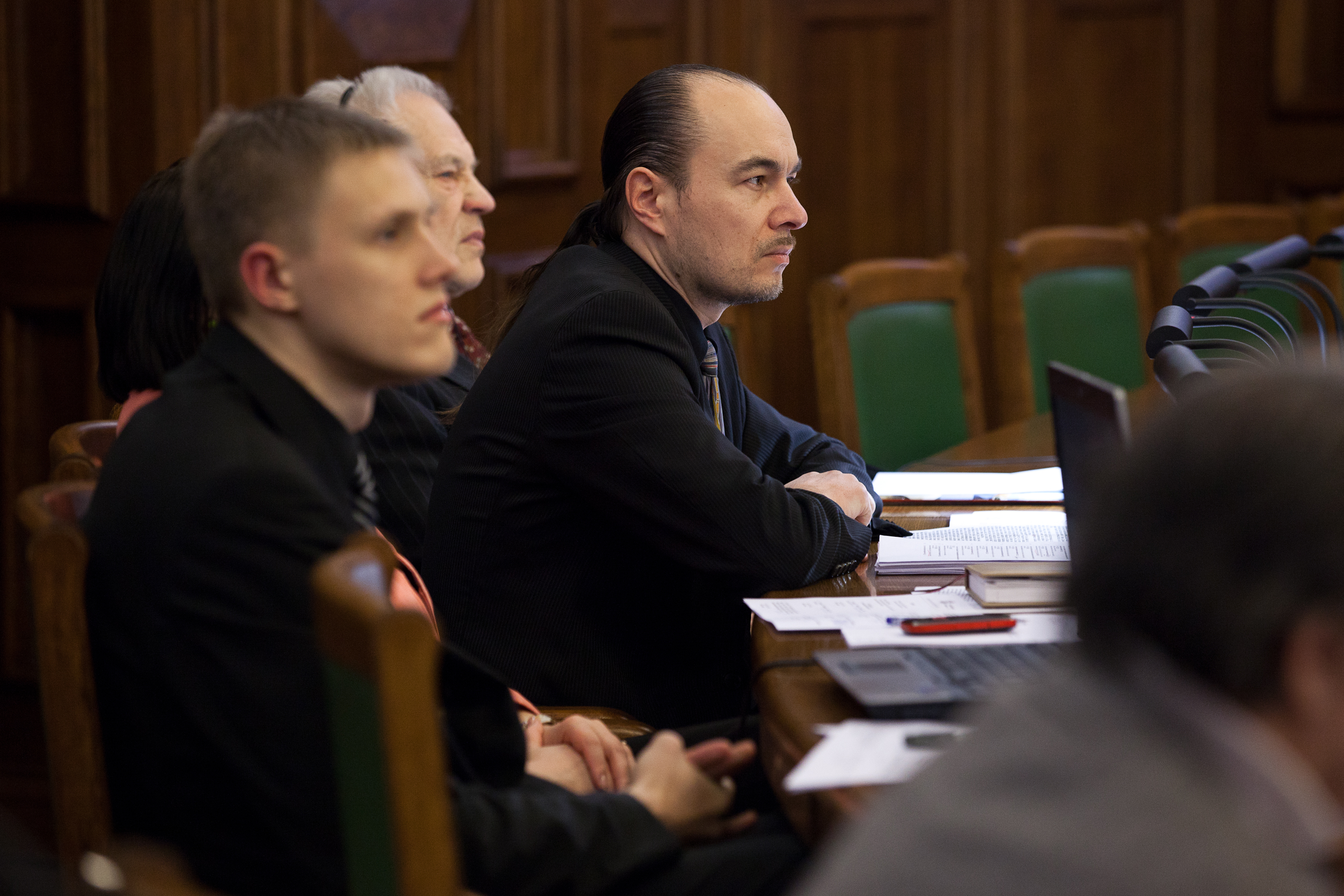
All for Latvia! MPs Jānis Dombrava, Visvaldis Lācis and Imants Parādnieks (from left to right) at a Saeima session on 3 March 2011

It was founded as an electoral alliance in 2010 by the national-conservative For Fatherland and Freedom/LNNK and the populist radical right All for Latvia! after both were refused entry into the Unity alliance. In the 2010 Latvian parliamentary election, the alliance won 8 seats. As part of the outgoing government, it was involved in negotiations after the election to renew the coalition but was vetoed by the Society for Political Change. During these negotiations, the National Alliance had drifted more to the right to become a candidate for Dombrovskis's 'fiscal consolidation' government, only to be vetoed because of its more radical nationalism.

In 2010, the National Alliance initiated a campaign to amend the Constitution of Latvia to make Latvian the sole language of instruction in state-funded schools, collecting the 10,140 signatures needed to launch an official signature drive. Held from 11 May to 9 June 2011, the drive gathered 112,608 signatures, falling short of the 153,232 required to trigger a referendum. In May 2011, the party supported the re-election of Valdis Zatlers in the 2011 Latvian presidential election.

=== As a political party (2011–present) ===
Both parties voted to merge on 23 July 2011.

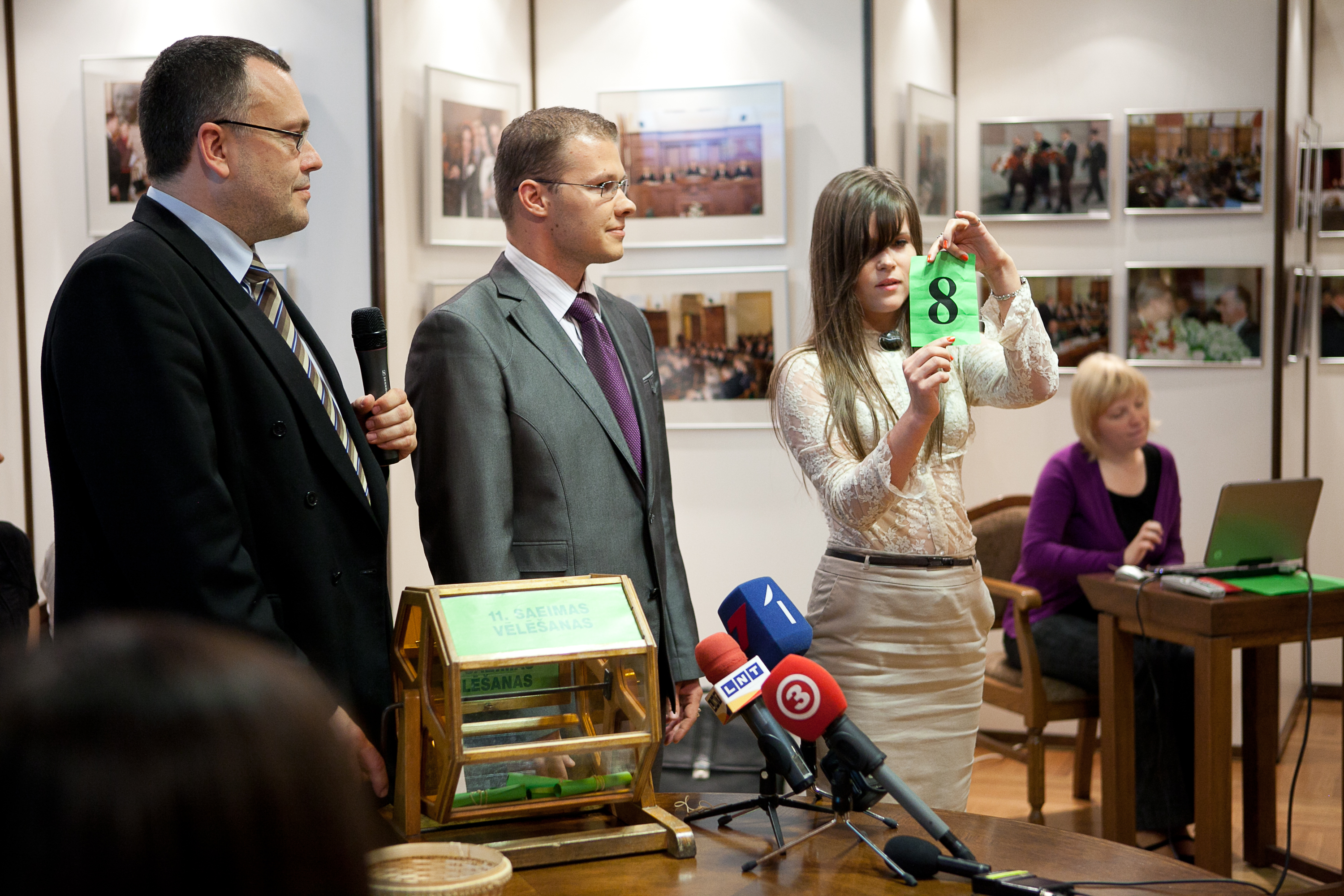
National Alliance co-chairman and prime ministerial candidate Raivis Dzintars (center), and party candidate Dace Kalniņa (right) at the drawing of ballot list numbers for the 2011 Latvian parliamentary election on 19 August 2011.

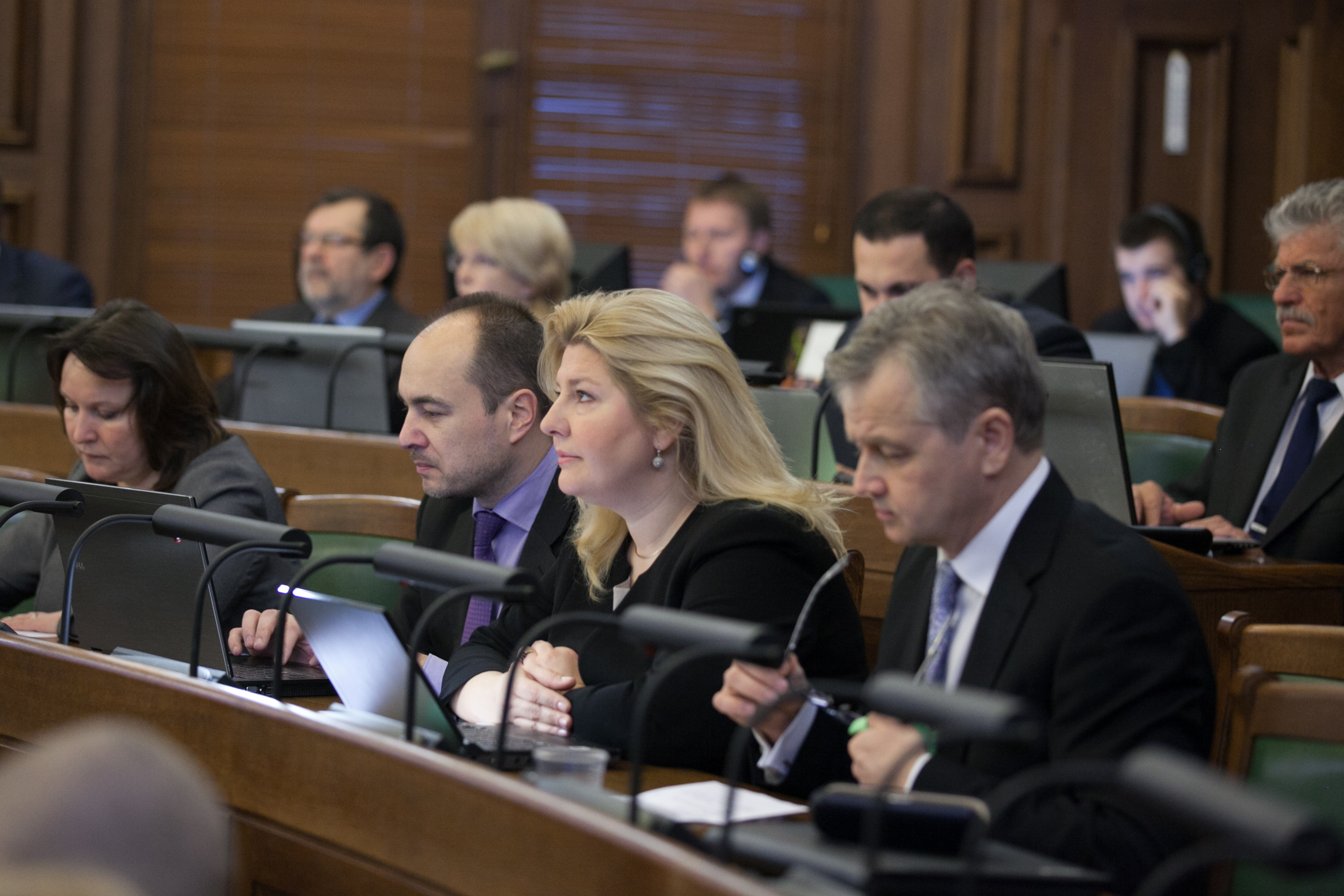
National Alliance MPs Ināra Mūrniece, Romāns Naudiņš, Kārlis Krēsliņš (second row from left to right), Inese Laizāne, Imants Parādnieks, Vineta Skujiņa and Ilmārs Latkovskis (first row from left to right) at a Saeima session on 22 November 2012

At the 2011 Latvian parliamentary election, the National Alliance won fourteen seats, an increase of six on the previous year, making it the fourth-largest party in the Saeima. After extensive negotiations with an aim to avoid Kremlin supporting powers from gaining seats in government, it joined a centre-right government with Unity and Zatlers' Reform Party, with the party's Gaidis Bērziņš as Minister for Justice and Žaneta Jaunzeme-Grende as Minister for Culture.

During coalition negotiations, the National Alliance added its own interpretation of four items in the coalition agreement, including support for state-funded higher education, the gradual transition to Latvian as the language of instruction in state-funded education institutions, and the removal of formal barriers to citizenship for non-citizen children while rejecting automatic citizenship. After becoming a junior coalition partner, the National Alliance shifted leftwards. By adopting a mildly oppositional stance towards the fiscally hawkish policies of Prime Minister Valdis Dombrovskis and Finance Minister Andris Vilks, the party blocked some budget proposals by calling for additional spending on families and children.

On 23 August 2013, marking the 25th anniversary of the Baltic Way, the All for Latvia! wing of National Alliance together with Estonian Conservative People's Party and Lithuanian Nationalist and Republican Union signed the Bauska Declaration pledging to promote a "new national awakening" among the Baltic peoples, emphasizing national sovereignty over supranational institutions, opposing immigration and multiculturalism, condemning Russian imperialism, and calling for compensation for damages resulting from the Soviet occupation. The merging of the two founding parties was finalized on the National Alliance's third congress on 7 December 2013, finally creating one unitary party.

In 2014, amid the Russo-Ukrainian war, the party's support had grown to 16.6% from 13.9% in 2011. For the 2014 Latvian parliamentary election, the National Alliance campaigned under the slogan "The safest choice for Latvia", emphasising Latvian nationalism, the protection of the Latvian language and culture, and national security, particularly in light of the Russo-Ukrainian war. While remaining part of the governing coalition, the party sought to distinguish itself from its coalition partners, with MEP Roberts Zīle serving as its prime ministerial candidate. The party gained 17 seats and entered a centre-right coalition, along with Unity and the Union of Greens and Farmers under Prime Minister Laimdota Straujuma. In the government, National Alliance received three ministerial posts: the Ministry of Environmental Protection and Regional Development, headed by Kaspars Gerhards; the Ministry of Justice, headed by Dzintars Rasnačs; and the Ministry of Culture, headed by Dace Melbārde.

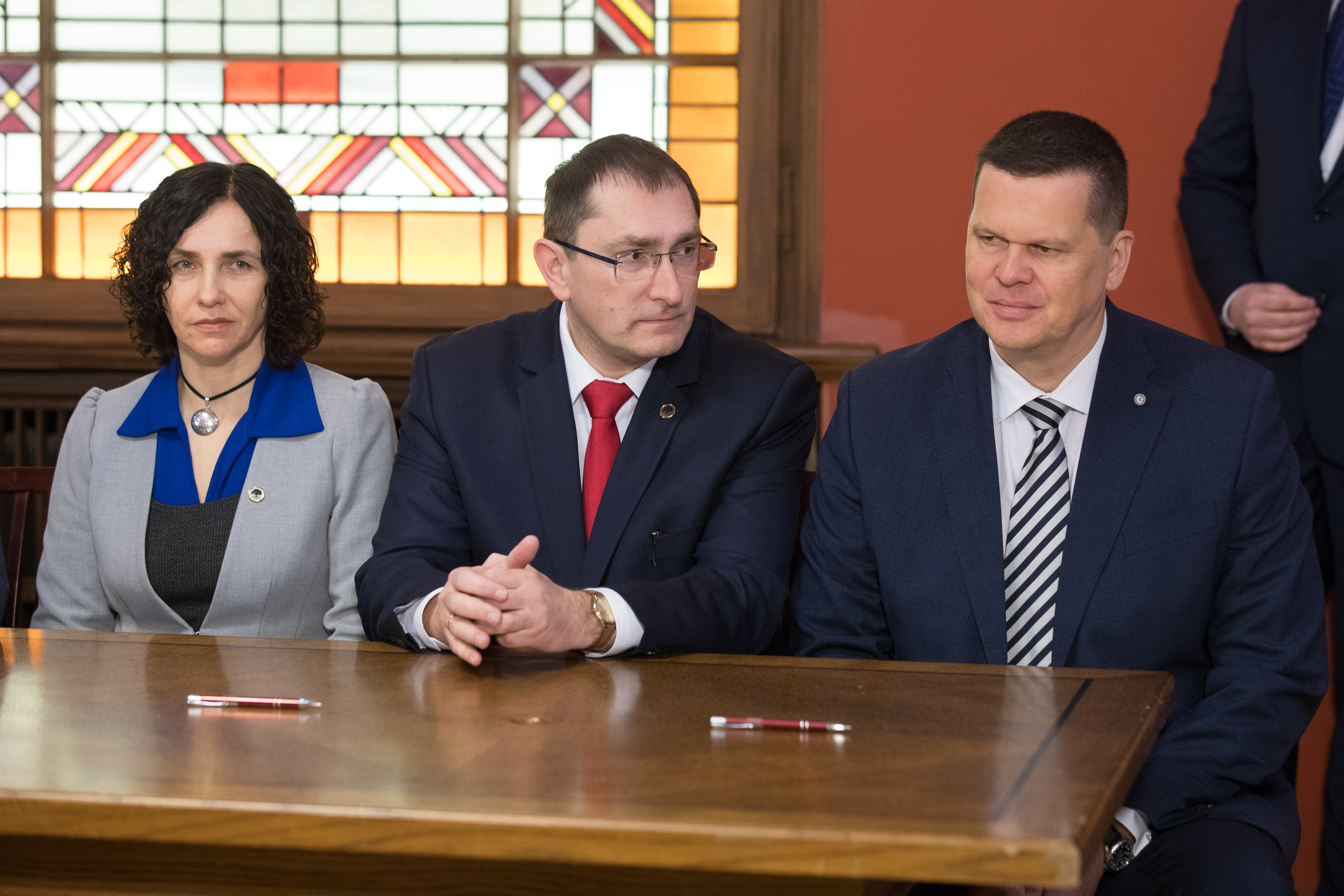
Kaspars Gerhards (right), National Alliance candidate for Minister of Agriculture, at the ceremonial signing of the Kariņš cabinet coalition agreement, fiscal discipline agreement, and government declaration on 23 January 2019

Ahead of the 2018 Latvian parliamentary election, National Alliance had become increasingly regarded as part of Latvia’s political establishment due to its continuous participation in government since 2011, with its role in government shifting political rhetoric rightwards while diminishing its anti-establishment image. After the election, in which it won 11.02% of the votes and 13 seats, The National Alliance joined a broad centre-right coalition government formed on 23 January 2019 under Prime Minister Krišjānis Kariņš, alongside Development/For!, the New Conservative Party, Kariņš' Unity, and Who Owns the State? party. Within the government, the National Alliance was allocated the ministerial posts of Agriculture (Kaspars Gerhards) and Culture (Dace Melbārde).

In 2019, Raivis Dzintars was re-elected unopposed as party chairman with the support of 239 delegates, while 16 voted against. The congress reaffirmed the party's leadership and highlighted priorities including national defence, opposition to administrative territorial reform, and regaining political influence in Riga.

The National Alliance's campaign for the 2022 Latvian parliamentary election included expanded welfare spending, such as free higher education, student loan cancellation, and subsidised housing, alongside support for state strategic sectors. It also proposed deporting foreign supporters of the Kremlin, introducing mandatory military training for men, setting "reasonable deadlines" for court proceedings, and making Latvian the language of instruction at all levels of education. The party additionally nominated Sigulda mayor Uģis Mitrevics as its prime ministerial candidate instead of the prior Roberts Zīle.

It received 84,939 or 9.29% of the votes, marking a decline from its 11.02% (92,963 votes) result in 2018 and a continued reduction of its voter base, which happened despite the 2022 Russian invasion of Ukraine and the collapse of its main right-wing rival, The Conservatives, who failed to cross the 5% parliamentary threshold. The National Alliance formed a majority coalition with New Unity and United List with 54 seats in the Saeima and was allocated four ministerial positions: Defence (Ināra Mūrniece), Economy (Ilze Indriksone), Culture (Nauris Puntulis), and Transport (Jānis Vitenbergs).

In February 2024, National Alliance expelled Aleksandrs Kiršteins from its parliamentary faction amid ongoing internal disagreements over political direction after his participation in a China-related delegation led by Ainārs Šlesers, which the party cited as inconsistent with its requirement for coordinated and unified foreign policy. In March polling, the National Alliance's support rose to 10.3%, an increase of 0.3 percentage points from the previous month and briefly placing it in first place ahead of New Unity that the Public Broadcasting of Latvia attributed to the departure of Aleksandrs Kiršteins, whom it described as one of National Alliance's most right-wing and divisive figures, and linked it to improved appeal among moderate conservative voters.

In July 2024, the Corruption Prevention and Combating Bureau ordered the National Alliance to repay 210,673.59€ and suspended its state budget funding for one year after determining that the party had exceeded legal limits on the use of public financing for communication and political advertising in 2022, surpassing the permitted 60% threshold under Latvia's political financing rules. The National Alliance appealed the decision.

In December 2025, Raivis Dzintars stepped down as chairman of the National Alliance after leading the party since its founding in 2010, with Ilze Indriksone running for the leadership post, emphasizing greater focus on economic issues without changing the party's political direction.

== Ideology and policies ==
The National Alliance has been described as national-conservative, right-wing populist, nationalist, and economically liberal. It has been placed at different points on the political spectrum, including centre-right, right wing, radical right and far right, while some have questioned its placement on the far-right.

Having been described as an "umbrella party" and a "fairly broad church" its MPs cover a wide range of positions in the right-of-centre category, from mainstream conservative positions to some considerably further to the right on the political spectrum, while still functioning as one parliamentary party. The party has also been characterised as bringing together Latvia's principal conservative-nationalist forces, ranging from moderate to ultranationalists or soft right to the far right, as well as a coalition of conservatives, ethnonationalists, and economic liberals, which has sought to distance itself from perceptions of extremism associated with the earlier activities of some of its leading members. Its official programme is generally more moderate than the private views attributed to some members. While some of the most prominent members such as Roberts Zīle, Nauris Puntulis and Rihards Kols have been described as closer to conventional conservative parties, others, such as former secretary general Raivis Zeltīts and parliamentary faction consultant Dace Kalniņa, have had documented contacts with British and Ukrainian far-right, although co-chairman Dzintars has publicly distanced the party from these associations, stating that National Alliance representatives are engaged with the Azov movement in their private capacity and that the geopolitical views of the party's secretary-general do not necessarily reflect the party's official politics and ideological positioning. Latvian-American human rights activist and political scientist Nils Muižnieks characterised the National Alliance as "relatively moderate" in 2011 and noted that the party had expelled some of its members for making antisemitic remarks.

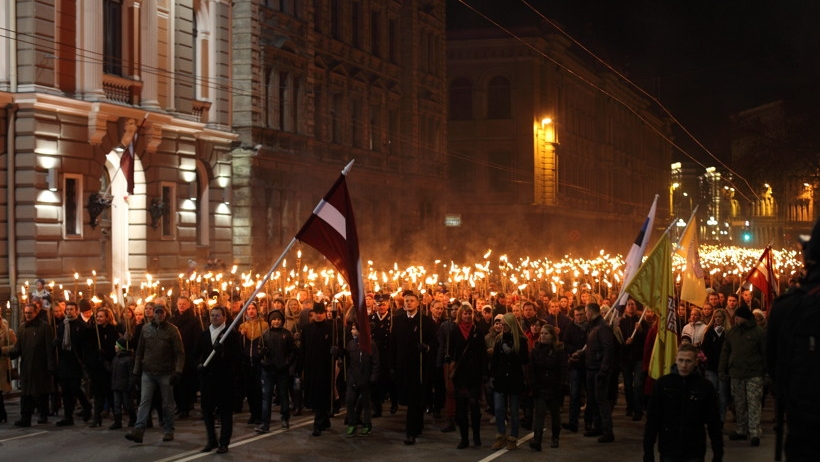
18th November Torch Procession in 2013, originally organised by All for Latvia! and later taken over by the National Alliance, with All for Latvia! leader Raivis Dzintars carrying the flag of Latvia at the front

In 2013, Daunis Auers and Andres Kasekamp argued that the National Alliance "ticks all the necessary boxes for a modern radical right populist party", citing its adoption of the radical right's rhetorical "master frame" of nativism, authoritarianism and populism, as well as the charismatic leadership of Raivis Dzintars, whose preference vote totals were twice those of the party's second-ranked candidate in the 2010 parliamentary election and three times higher in the 2011 election. They have argued that support for the Kārlis Ulmanis authoritarian regime forms a central part in the National Alliance's ideology, including the prominent role of Kārlis Ulmanis in the party's Independence Day celebrations, which feature a torch procession from his statue to the Freedom Monument. The National Alliance has also aligned with anti-corruption parties, emphasizing law-and-order politics and presenting itself as introducing a "new political culture" in parliament through free votes by its deputies and regular social media communication. It also uses direct-democratic tools, including signature campaigns for referendums on Latvian-language education and a directly elected president. However, Auers and Kasekamp also noted that, unlike many Western European radical-right parties, National Alliance's politics centred on Latvia's ethnic cleavage rather than opposition to European integration or globalization.

In 2023, Auers observed that the party's participation in government had contributed to its mainstreaming and a decline in explicitly anti-elite and anti-corruption rhetoric; as it became an established part of Latvia’s governing elite and abandoned its populist rhetoric. In 2024, Auers argued that the National Alliance had normalized its position within the Latvian political system through its long participation in the Latvian government, distinguishing it from many Western European far-right parties that have remained primarily protest movements. He contended that the party had largely resisted the ideological Europeanization of the far right, remaining rooted in Latvia's historical experience and domestic ethnic cleavages rather than adopting the dominant themes of Western European radical-right politics. Although the merger with All for Latvia! broadened the party's ideological profile by introducing stronger opposition to multiculturalism, immigration, and liberal social values, these issues remained secondary to concerns over Latvian nationhood, the status of the Latvian language, and national security. According to Auers, the party's consistently hawkish stance on Russia and its efforts to "de-Russify" Latvia have shifted the national political mainstream, while its primary ideological focus on countering Russian influence has prevented it from converging fully with broader European far-right, where immigration and Islam typically constitute the central mobilizing issues.

In 2026, political scientist Vassilis Petsinis argued that the National Alliance had undergone a process of "de-radicalization" through sustained participation in government, developing into a party of the national conservative right rather than the radical right. He contrasted the party's trajectory with more radical right-wing movements in the region, arguing that the National Alliance became integrated into Latvia's political mainstream by pursuing its goals through parliamentary and governmental institutions. Although it retained its emphasis on Latvian national identity, language policy, and opposition to Russian influence, the party moderated its anti-systemic tendencies and increasingly aligned with broader centre-right positions.

=== Economic and welfare policy ===
Economically, the party combines support for free-market policies and tax reductions with elements of economic nationalism and welfare chauvinism. Its programme emphasizes strengthening the national economy, reducing emigration, encouraging the return of Latvian expatriates, and supporting domestic economic development. The party has also criticized aspects of European Union economic policy and advocates targeted welfare measures linked to its broader demographic objectives.

=== Family and demographic policy ===
Family and demographic policy has been one of the National Alliance's principal priorities since entering government in 2011, reflecting its stated objective of promoting population growth and preserving the Latvian nation. Beginning with the 2012 state budget negotiations, the party repeatedly issued what have been termed as "demography ultimatums", making its support for coalition budgets contingent on the adoption of measures to support families with children. Among its proposals were increases in childcare and family benefits, support for preschool expenses, expanded parental leave, additional benefits for large families through its "Third Child" initiative, and stronger legal protections for parents during pregnancy and consecutive births. Several family-policy reforms adopted from 2013 onwards, including more generous childcare benefits, extended parental leave provisions, and increased support for families with three or more children, have been attributed by scholars to the National Alliance's influence within governing coalitions. According to some analyses, these reforms reflected the party's demographic priorities despite limited ideological support from some coalition partners, who generally favoured more targeted forms of family assistance and expressed concerns about the effects of such policies on labour-market participation.

In 2016, National Alliance advocated for the establishment of a dedicated Minister for Demography and has sought to make demographic policy a priority of government, arguing for stronger support for measures to address Latvia's demographic challenges.

In 2021, the party submitted to the Saeima a draft law regarding an amendment to the Constitution, which intended to strictly define the concept of family as a union of a male and a female person.

=== Migration policy ===
During the 2015 European migrant crisis, the party consistently opposed mandatory EU refugee relocation quotas, arguing that Latvia should retain full control over immigration and asylum policy. National Alliance ministers also voted against the Straujuma cabinet's decision to voluntarily accept an additional 526 refugees under the EU relocation scheme.

Party co-chairman Gaidis Bērziņš argued that Latvia's history and demographic situation justified exemptions or special treatment regarding refugee admissions under EU burden-sharing mechanisms. In August 2015, party members took part in organizing an anti-immigration protest in front of the Palace of Justice in Riga. This anti-immigration position was accented in the annual foreign affair debates in the Saeima, also turning against perceived liberal immigration policy and political correctness in the EU.

In 2017, National Alliance opposed proposals to relax guest worker hiring rules in Latvia, warning that increased low-wage labor migration could depress wages for domestic workers and intensify labour market pressures despite reported sectoral labour shortages. It has compared the modern advocates of immigration with those who supported the planned mass immigration to the Latvian Soviet Socialist Republic, which affected the demographics of Latvia.

In 2025, the party co-initiated and supported the creation of a parliamentary investigative commission tasked with reviewing Latvia’s immigration and asylum systems to identify regulatory and enforcement gaps and propose stricter migration control and security measures; its chairman and National Alliance MP Jānis Dombrava stated that "politicians, entrepreneurs, and organized crime see the money that can be made from immigrants" and that "the internal affairs services are pushed aside, their warnings are ignored."

=== Environmental policy ===
The party has a relatively consistent but internally mixed view of the environment in its official platforms. Nature and the environment are repeatedly presented both as an element of national identity and as an economic asset. On the one hand, party documents describe the natural environment as a "national treasure" and link it to the spiritual and cultural strength of the nation, especially in relation to forests and rural landscapes. On the other hand, environmental resources are explicitly framed as instruments for economic growth, employment, and national competitiveness.

A central recurring theme is the idea of a "green country" and "green economy". The party promotes forestry, agriculture, and tourism as sectors where Latvia's natural endowments can be leveraged, including organic production and eco-tourism. At the same time, it stresses that forest and environmental policy should balance economic use with biodiversity conservation and long-term sustainability, with some later documents incorporating language aligned with sustainable development frameworks and circular economy ideas.

In terms of governance, the dominant position of National Alliance is statist. The state is consistently assigned primary responsibility for environmental policy, including regulation of land use, environmental protection, forest management, and setting development priorities for the green economy. Market-based instruments appear, but mainly as supporting mechanisms rather than autonomous drivers of sustainability policy.

Participatory governance and broader network-based approaches are present but limited. Some references are made to expert involvement and public participation in planning, but these remain secondary to state coordination. Overall, the party's approach combines a strong state-centered governance model with selective adoption of sustainable development discourse, shaped by concerns over resource sovereignty and national control over key assets such as forests.

=== Remembrance Day of the Latvian Legionnaires ===
The party supports the establishment of a national day of remembrance for the Latvian Legion, a mostly conscription-based military formation within Nazi Germany's Waffen-SS, arguing that they were not Nazis but rather martyred liberation fighters resisting both the Soviet and Nazi occupations, who were later acquitted at the Nuremberg trials. The Saeima has rejected proposals by the National Alliance to formally establish it as a holiday in 2013, 2018, and 2019. MPs from the National Alliance are regular participants in the annual commemoration events for the Latvian Legion.

=== Foreign policy ===
Latvia is and will be an active and loyal member of the European Union (EU) and NATO. Therefore, the National Union is vigorously involved both in increasing defense spending and in supporting the continuous presence of allied NATO troops in Latvia.

The NA advocates a European Union of national states whose sovereignty and cultural qualities are respected and valued. The National Alliance opposes the federalization of the EU, which would result in small countries such as Latvia losing the opportunity to equally influence the processes of development and advancement of the EU.

— National Alliance (2018)

National Alliance's foreign policy is strongly shaped by Latvia’s relations with Russia and its orientation toward Euro-Atlantic security structures. The party supports Latvia’s membership in the European Union and NATO, frames Latvia as part of the Western geopolitical space, advocating reducing Russian political and cultural influence. It has consistently taken a critical stance towards Russia, including opposition to Russian actions in Ukraine. In European Parliament politics, it is affiliated with the European Conservatives and Reformists Group rather than the Identity and Democracy group, reflecting its broader pro-Western alignment compared to more Russia-friendly right-wing parties in Europe.

==== European Union ====
National Alliance has been described as exhibiting geopolitical, economic and sociocultural forms of Euroscepticism. While supporting Latvia's membership of the European Union for geopolitical and security reasons, it opposes European federalism and advocates greater national sovereignty, particularly in matters of immigration and national identity. The party has criticized multiculturalism and other aspects of European integration associated with Euro-federalism. Following its entry into government in 2011, it has moderated its Eurosceptic rhetoric, presenting itself as seeking a return to the European Union's "original" values rather than opposing membership itself.

==== Russia ====
The National Alliance's position on Russia is structured around three main themes: general outlook, historical memory, and defence. In its general foreign policy orientation, the party does not regard Russia as a cooperative partner and instead frames it as a geopolitical and civilisational "other". It has advocated Latvia's distancing from Russia's sphere of influence, or the so-called "Russian world", and consistently emphasised Latvia’s belonging to the "Western geopolitical space", alongside pledges to "liberate" Latvia from Russia’s geopolitical influence. Unlike other Western European nationalist parties, the National Alliance has not advanced territorial claims or sought to reopen the Latvian–Russian border settlement, instead focusing on countering Russian political, economic, and cultural influence.

A second theme concerns historical memory and the interpretation of Soviet rule. The party has repeatedly framed Russia as responsible for the Soviet occupation of Latvia, advocating international recognition of "the totalitarian Communist crimes as identical to the National Socialist crimes". It has supported legal measures against the denial of Latvia’s occupation and called for restrictions on the public use of Soviet and Russian imperial symbols. This emphasis reflects a broader memory-political agenda in which Soviet-era history is treated as central to Latvia's contemporary political identity.

The third theme relates to security and defence, particularly Russia's political influence in Latvia. The National Alliance has consistently emphasised in its manifestos its self-proclaimed role as the guarantor that no "pro-Russian" party would be included in coalition government in Latvia, stating that it is "the only force represented in Saeima which strongly defends the interests of citizens of Latvia and Latvians and precludes the inclusion of the Kremlin’s partners in the government". This position has been closely associated with its criticism of Harmony Centre, particularly its cooperation agreement with United Russia and its ambiguous stance regarding the Soviet occupation of Latvia in 1940. In addition, the party has advocated reducing Latvia's dependence on Russia in sectors such as energy, finance, and real estate, increasing defence spending to NATO targets, and strengthening military preparedness.

Following Russia's invasion of Ukraine in 2022, the National Alliance's long-standing warnings about Russia gained broader political acceptance in Latvia. Policies the party had advocated for years, such as reducing the role of the Russian language in public life, ending state-funded Russian-language education, and removing Soviet monuments, became increasingly mainstream. The party's opposition to Vladimir Putin's regime and its support for Ukraine strengthened a public perception that it had been "right" about Russia.

== Voter base ==
The National Alliance's voter base consists predominantly of Latvian-speaking voters, with only 4% of its voters speaking Russian at home. In the 2022 Latvian parliamentary election, the party had a gender-balanced and age-balanced electorate, with voters with higher education slightly overrepresented. It attracted support from citizens across different income groups and was comparatively successful in reaching rural voters. For 50% of National Alliance voters, the party's advocacy on specific issues relevant to their interests was among the most important criteria in their electoral choice. The party also had a relatively stable electorate, with 42% of its voters making their final voting decision during the last week of the campaign, among the lowest shares compared with other major parties.

Ideologically, National Alliance voters occupy an intermediate position between the more change-oriented electorates of New Unity and The Progressives and the more conservative-authoritarian electorates of Latvia First and Sovereign Power. They share a broadly similar conservative-authoritarian orientation with voters of the United List and the Union of Greens and Farmers, although the National Alliance voters exhibit somewhat weaker authoritarian attitudes than supporters of those two parties.

== Election results ==
=== Legislative elections ===
Election	Party leader	Performance					Rank	Government
Election	Party leader	Votes	%	± pp	Seats	+/–	Rank	Government
2010	Roberts Zīle	74,029	7.84	New	8 / 100	New	4th	Opposition
2011	Raivis Dzintars	127,208	14.01	▲6.17	14 / 100	▲6	4th	Coalition
2014	Raivis Dzintars	151,567	16.72	▲2.71	17 / 100	▲3	4th	Coalition
2018	Roberts Zīle	92,963	11.08	▼5.64	13 / 100	▼4	▼5th	Coalition
2022	Raivis Dzintars	84,939	9.40	▼1.68	13 / 100	0	▲4th	Coalition (2022–2023)
2022	Raivis Dzintars	84,939	9.40	▼1.68	13 / 100	0	▲4th	Opposition (2023–2026)
2022	Raivis Dzintars	84,939	9.40	▼1.68	13 / 100	0	▲4th	Coalition (2026)
2026	Ilze Indriksone	71,579	9.02	▼0.38	10 / 100	▼3	4th	Coalition

=== European Parliament elections ===
Election	List leader	Votes	%	Seats	+/–	EP Group
2014	Roberts Zīle	63,229	17.56 (#3)	1 / 8	New	ECR
2019	Roberts Zīle	77,591	16.49 (#3)	2 / 8	▲1	ECR
2024	Roberts Zīle	114,858	22.32 (#2)	2 / 9	0	ECR

=== Riga City Council ===
Election	Votes	%	Seats	+/–
2013	40,920	17.86 (#2)	12 / 60	
2017	23,135	9.25 (#4)	6 / 60	▼6
2020	16,435	9.64 (#4)	7 / 60	▲1
2025	30,328	14.20 (#3)	10 / 60	▲3

== See also ==
- For Fatherland and Freedom/LNNK
- All for Latvia!
