= Reparation =

Reparation(s) may refer to:

== Christianity ==
- Reparation (theology), the theological concept of corrective response to God and the associated prayers for repairing the damages of sin
- Restitution (theology), the Christian doctrine calling for reparation for the harm done to others

== History ==
- War reparations
  - World War I reparations, payable by the Central Powers for damage caused during the war.
- Reparations Agreement between Israel and the Federal Republic of Germany, Holocaust reparations

== Law ==
- Reparation (legal), the legal philosophy
- Reparations (transitional justice), measures taken by the state to redress gross and systematic violations of human rights law or humanitarian law
- Reparations for slavery, proposed compensation for the Atlantic slave trade, to assist the descendants of enslaved peoples
  - Reparations for slavery in the United States
- Reparations (website), website devoted to cause of compensation for the descendants of the Transatlantic Slave Trade

== Music ==
- Reparation (album), an album by Eddy Grant, or the title song
- Reparations (song), a 2021 single by Kashdami

== Other uses ==
- Reparation (psychoanalysis), a psychological process of making mental repairs to a damaged internal world

== See also ==
- Repatriation
