= Raivis Dzintars =

Latvian right-wing politician

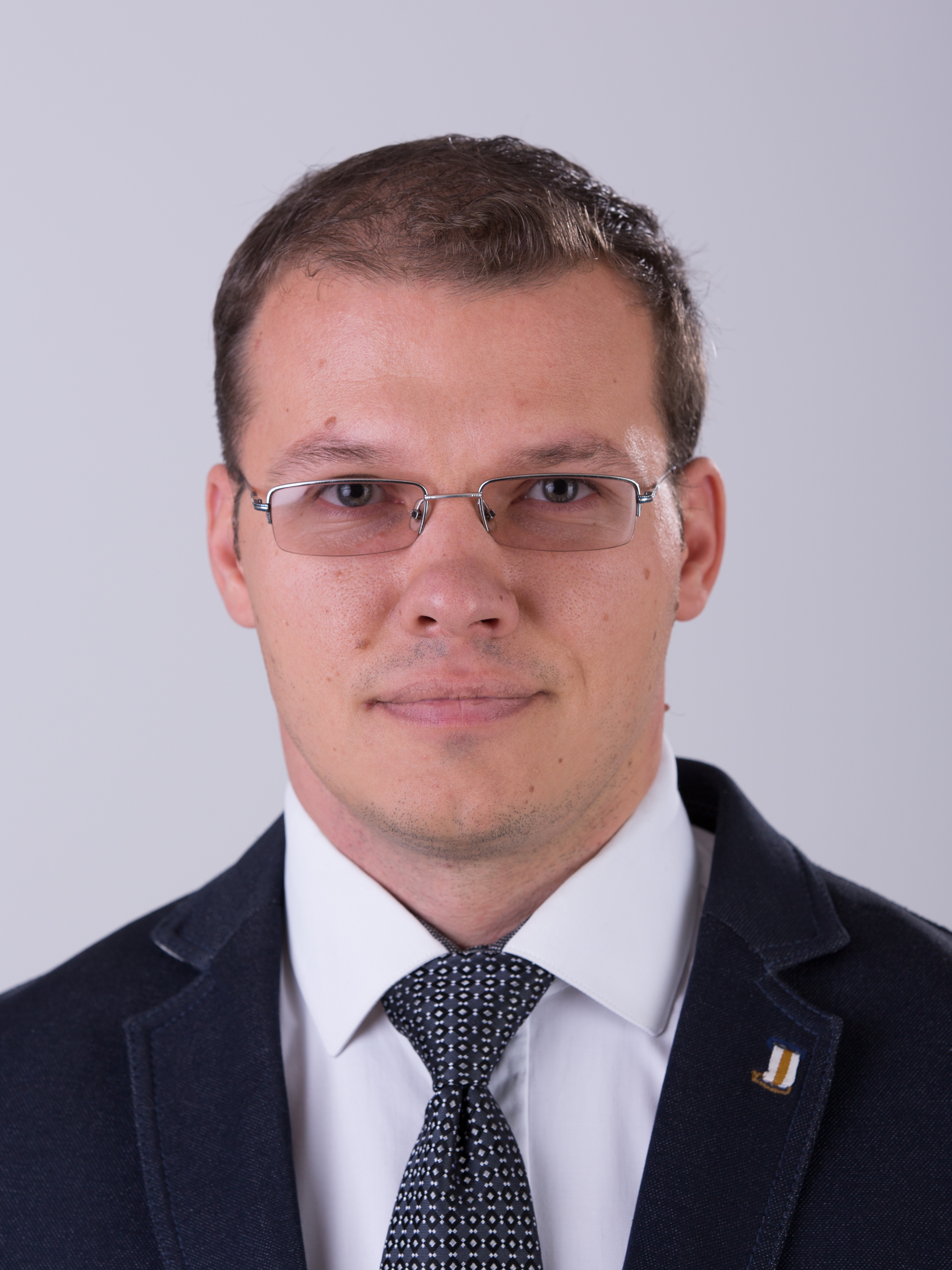
- Dzintars in 2014

Member of the Saeima
- In office 2 October 2010 – 3 November 2026

Personal details
- Born: 25 November 1982 (age 43) Riga, Latvian SSR
- Party: National Alliance
- Other political affiliations: All for Latvia! (2006–2011); National Alliance (from 2011)
- Spouse: Marta Dzintare
- Children: 3 sons
- Profession: Politician

Raivis Dzintars (born 25 November 1982) is a Latvian right-wing politician and chairman of the national-conservative National Alliance party. He has previously served as the party's co-chairman alongside Gaidis Bērziņš.

Born in Riga, he was elected to the Saeima at the 2010 parliamentary election. He was the Alliance's candidate for Prime Minister at the 2011 election, at which the party increased its number of seats from 8 to 14.
