= Kaspars Gerhards =

Latvian politician

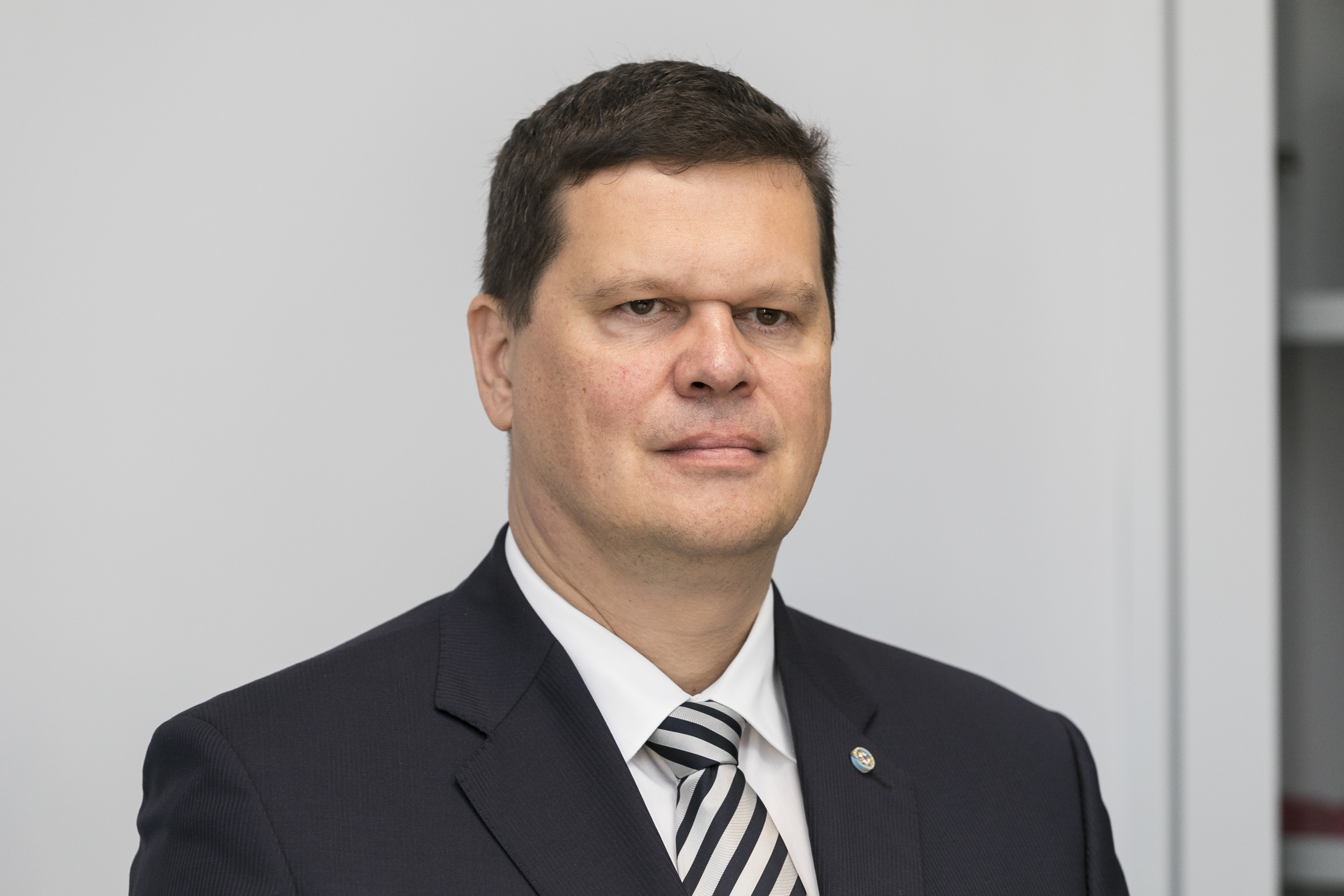
Gerhards in 2017

Kaspars Gerhards (born 7 February 1969) is a Latvian politician of the TB/LNNK (2008–11), respectively National Alliance (since 2011) party. He was the economy minister from 2007 to 2009, minister of transport from 2009 to 2010 and minister of environmental protection and regional development from 2014 to 2019. Since January 2019 he has served as minister of agriculture of Latvia.
