= Latgallia (Saeima constituency) =

Constituency of the Saeima, the national legislature of Latvia

- Latgale; Latgola; Латгалия
- Constituency for the Saeima
- Location of Latgallia within Latvia
- Municipality: List: Daugavpils City; Rēzekne City; Augšdaugava; Balvi; Krāslava; Līvāni; Ludza; Preiļi; Rēzekne
- Region: Latgallia
- Population: 247,220 (2022)
- Electorate: 194,825 (2022)
- Area: 14,547 km^{2} (2023)

Current constituency
- Created: 1922
- Seats: List: 13 (2022–present); 14 (2018–2022); 15 (2011–2018); 16 (2006–2011); 17 (2002–2006); 18 (1998–2002); 19 (1995–1998); 20 (1993–1995); 25 (1922–1934)
- Deputies: List: Anita Brakovska (ZZS); Jekaterina Dorošķeviča (S!); Iļja Ivanovs (S!); Līga Kozlovska (ZZS); Rihards Kozlovskis (JV); Vilis Krištopans (LPV); Kaspars Melnis (ZZS); Viktorija Pleškāne (S!); Viktors Pučka (S!); Anna Rancāne (JV); Leila Rasima (PRO); Edmunds Teirumnieks (NA); Juris Viļums (AS)

Latgallia (Latvian: Latgale; Latgalian: Latgola, Russian: Латгалия) is one of the five multi-member constituencies of the Saeima, the national legislature of Latvia. The constituency was established in 1922 when the Saeima was established following Latvia's independence. It consists of the cities of Daugavpils and Rēzekne and municipalities of Augšdaugava, Balvi, Krāslava, Līvāni, Ludza, Preiļi and Rēzekne in the region of Latgallia. The constituency currently elects 13 of the 100 members of the Saeima using the open party-list proportional representation electoral system. At the 2022 parliamentary election it had 194,825 registered electors.

== Electoral system ==
Latgallia currently elects 13 of the 100 members of the Saeima using the open party-list proportional representation electoral system. Constituency seats are allocated using the Sainte-Laguë method. Only parties that reach the 5% national threshold compete for constituency seats (4% in 1993).

== Election results ==
=== Summary ===
Election	SKG SKG / LSDSP / ATBILDĪBA / LSDA			Harmony SDPS / SC / TSP / SL			Development/For! AP! / LA			Greens & Farmers ZZS / LZS			New Unity JV / V / JL			Latvia First Latvian Way LPP/LC / LC			Conservatives K / JKP			Russian Union РСЛ / ЗаПЧЕЛ / P			Good Latvia PL / TP			National Alliance NA / TB/LNNK / TB		
Election	Votes	%	Seats	Votes	%	Seats	Votes	%	Seats	Votes	%	Seats	Votes	%	Seats	Votes	%	Seats	Votes	%	Seats	Votes	%	Seats	Votes	%	Seats	Votes	%	Seats
2022				12,749	11.59%	0	4,420	4.02%	0	16,157	14.69%	3	7,747	7.04%	2				2,809	2.55%	0	8,022	7.29%	0				6,428	5.84%	1
2018	242	0.27%	0	32,159	36.02%	6	4,181	4.68%	1	12,539	14.05%	2	5,067	5.68%	1				7,900	8.85%	2	9,561	10.71%	0				4,465	5.00%	1
2014				41,884	39.92%	6	712	0.68%	0	19,714	18.79%	3	16,187	15.43%	3				650	0.62%	0	4,970	4.74%	0				5,442	5.19%	1
2011	394	0.34%	0	60,784	52.63%	8				14,436	12.50%	2	11,608	10.05%	2	3,904	3.38%	0				1,608	1.39%	0				5,350	4.63%	1
2010	1,259	0.98%	0	59,281	46.26%	8				20,844	16.26%	3	19,231	15.01%	2							3,661	2.86%	0	15,387	12.01%	2	3,958	3.09%	1
2006	7,241	5.46%	0	36,859	27.81%	5				16,759	12.65%	2	8,693	6.56%	1	18,833	14.21%	3				10,747	8.11%	1	18,844	14.22%	3	5,324	4.02%	1
2002	7,620	4.86%	0							15,081	9.62%	2	15,076	9.61%	2	8,362	5.33%	0				57,707	36.79%	9	11,575	7.38%	2	5,907	3.77%	1
1998	14,971	9.21%	2	58,239	35.84%	7				3,601	2.22%	0				36,978	22.76%	5							13,935	8.58%	2	7,388	4.55%	1
1995	2,868	1.72%	0	18,193	10.90%	2				1,898	1.14%	0				24,692	14.79%	3										5,247	3.14%	1
1993	2,633	1.24%	0	49,283	23.30%	5				21,118	9.98%	2				58,425	27.62%	7				33,920	16.03%	4				4,083	1.93%	0
1931	15,546	6.27%	2							6,916	2.79%	1																		
1928	25,352	10.82%	3							7,311	3.12%	1																		
1925	42,737	19.89%	5							8,504	3.96%	1																		
1922	35,740	18.39%	4							8,675	4.46%	1																		

=== Detailed ===
Party has received at least 5% of the vote nationally and is entitled to compete for constituency seats (4% in 1993).

==== 2020s ====
===== 2022 =====
Results of the 2022 parliamentary election held on 1 October 2022:

Party		Votes per municipality									Total votes	%	Seats
Party		Augš- dauga- va	Balvi	Daugav- pils City	Krās- lava	Līvāni	Ludza	Preiļi	Rēzek- ne City	Rēzek- ne	Total votes	%	Seats
For Stability!	S!	2,034	278	8,498	1,688	412	1,389	575	3,265	2,495	20,634	18.76%	4
Union of Greens and Farmers	ZZS	1,700	2,260	3,073	1,495	556	1,916	1,542	1,539	2,076	16,157	14.69%	3
Social Democratic Party "Harmony"	SDPS	1,234	426	5,518	975	240	1,002	465	1,784	1,105	12,749	11.59%	0
Latvian Russian Union	РСЛ	856	158	3,576	684	165	665	255	1,100	563	8,022	7.29%	0
New Unity	JV	667	942	689	529	602	1,046	1,529	836	907	7,747	7.04%	2
Latvia First	LPV	661	421	1,839	864	327	751	635	1,072	689	7,259	6.60%	1
National Alliance	NA	582	1,032	703	300	551	354	961	949	996	6,428	5.84%	1
United List	AS	585	858	1,048	565	441	424	480	612	680	5,693	5.18%	1
Sovereign Power	SV	526	123	2,461	349	156	418	233	880	380	5,526	5.02%	0
Development/For!	AP	493	347	1,073	363	780	144	442	358	420	4,420	4.02%	0
For Each and Every One	KuK	324	258	1,796	244	365	246	207	408	284	4,132	3.76%	0
The Conservatives	K	138	879	144	258	178	196	306	272	438	2,809	2.55%	0
The Progressives	PRO	177	243	511	139	224	201	227	607	406	2,735	2.49%	1
Force of People's Power	TVS	190	87	630	172	65	252	143	381	226	2,146	1.95%	0
Republic	R	164	217	435	173	98	274	183	274	155	1,973	1.79%	0
People's Servants for Latvia	TKL	75	130	245	107	80	63	140	100	139	1,079	0.98%	0
Union for Latvia	AL	23	34	43	19	8	12	8	13	15	175	0.16%	0
Progressive Christian Party	KPP	12	25	39	7	7	18	9	20	19	156	0.14%	0
United for Latvia	VL	13	23	24	12	12	18	19	10	23	154	0.14%	0
Valid votes		10,454	8,741	32,345	8,943	5,267	9,389	8,359	14,480	12,016	109,994	100.00%	13
Rejected votes		113	105	323	98	77	94	91	132	132	1,165	1.05%	
Valid envelopes		10,567	8,846	32,668	9,041	5,344	9,483	8,450	14,612	12,148	111,159	99.86%	
Rejected envelopes		3	11	42	20	10	14	4	43	13	160	0.14%	
Total polled		10,570	8,857	32,710	9,061	5,354	9,497	8,454	14,655	12,161	111,319	57.14%	
Registered electors		20,267	15,804	55,480	16,747	8,771	17,704	13,954	21,799	24,299	194,825		
Turnout		52.15%	56.04%	58.96%	54.11%	61.04%	53.64%	60.58%	67.23%	50.05%	57.14%		

The following candidates were elected: Anita Brakovska (ZZS), 17,312 votes; Iļja Ivanovs (S!), 24,476 votes; Līga Kozlovska (ZZS), 17,906 votes; Rihards Kozlovskis (JV), 8,640 votes; Vilis Krištopans (LPV), 9,968 votes; Kaspars Melnis (ZZS), 18,671 votes; Viktorija Pleškāne (S!), 27,301 votes; Viktors Pučka (S!), 25,028 votes; Anna Rancāne (JV), 8,466 votes; Leila Rasima (PRO), 3,666 votes; Edmunds Teirumnieks (NA), 7,582 votes; Nadežda Tretjakova (S!), 24,478 votes; and Juris Viļums (AS), 6,738 votes.

==== 2010s ====
===== 2018 =====
Results of the 2018 parliamentary election held on 6 October 2018:

Party		Votes	%	Seats
Social Democratic Party "Harmony"	SDPS	32,159	36.02%	6
Union of Greens and Farmers	ZZS	12,539	14.05%	2
Latvian Russian Union	РСЛ	9,561	10.71%	0
New Conservative Party	JKP	7,900	8.85%	2
Who Owns the State?	KPV LV	6,874	7.70%	1
New Unity	JV	5,067	5.68%	1
National Alliance	NA	4,465	5.00%	1
Development/For!	AP	4,181	4.68%	1
Latvian Association of Regions	LRA	3,849	4.31%	0
For Latvia from the Heart	NSL	865	0.97%	0
The Progressives	PRO	840	0.94%	0
SKG Alliance	SKG	242	0.27%	0
Latvian Nationalists	LN	209	0.23%	0
Action Party	RP	204	0.23%	0
For an Alternative	PA	168	0.19%	0
Latvian Centrist Party	LCP	154	0.17%	0
Valid votes		89,277	100.00%	14
Rejected votes		719	0.80%	
Valid envelopes		89,996	99.92%	
Rejected envelopes		70	0.08%	
Total polled		90,066	43.40%	
Registered electors		207,523		

The following candidates were elected: Aldis Adamovičs (JV), 6,656 votes; Mārtiņš Bondars (AP), 5,219 votes; Jānis Dūklavs (ZZS), 14,720 votes; Inga Goldberga (SDPS), 38,416 votes; Janīna Jalinska (ZZS), 12,912 votes; Jānis Krišāns (SDPS), 35,633 votes; Edgars Kucins (SDPS), 35,803 votes; Janīna Kursīte (KPV LV), 7,789 votes; Vladimirs Nikonovs (SDPS), 35,442 votes; Juris Rancāns (JKP), 8,689 votes; Ivans Ribakovs (SDPS), 38,138 votes; Ilga Šuplinska (JKP), 9,377 votes; Edmunds Teirumnieks (NA), 5,732 votes; and Jānis Tutins (SDPS), 35,267 votes.

===== 2014 =====
Results of the 2014 parliamentary election held on 4 October 2014:

Party		Votes	%	Seats
Social Democratic Party "Harmony"	SDPS	41,884	39.92%	6
Union of Greens and Farmers	ZZS	19,714	18.79%	3
Unity	V	16,187	15.43%	3
For Latvia from the Heart	NSL	9,070	8.64%	1
National Alliance	NA	5,442	5.19%	1
Latvian Russian Union	РСЛ	4,970	4.74%	0
Latvian Association of Regions	LRA	4,025	3.84%	1
United for Latvia	VL	1,709	1.63%	0
For Latvia's Development	LA	712	0.68%	0
New Conservative Party	JKP	650	0.62%	0
Freedom. Free from Fear, Hate and Anger		247	0.24%	0
Sovereignty		206	0.20%	0
Izaugsme		104	0.10%	0
Valid votes		104,920	100.00%	15
Rejected votes		1,019	0.96%	
Valid envelopes		105,939	99.90%	
Rejected envelopes		104	0.10%	
Total polled		106,043	46.99%	
Registered electors		225,675		

The following candidates were elected: Aldis Adamovičs (JV), 17,762 votes; Rihards Eigims (ZZS), 20,010 votes; Andrejs Elksniņš (SDPS), 53,658 votes; Marjana Ivanova-Jevsejeva (SDPS), 45,602 votes; Jānis Klaužs (ZZS), 20,370 votes; Inese Laizāne (NA), 6,475 votes; Anrijs Matīss (V), 16,961 votes; Vladimirs Nikonovs (SDPS), 46,040 votes; Ivans Ribakovs (SDPS), 50,621 votes; Raimonds Rubiks (SDPS), 45,493 votes; Silvija Šimfa (NSL), 9,982 votes; Jānis Tutins (SDPS), 47,399 votes; Raimonds Vējonis (ZZS), 20,979 votes; Juris Viļums (LRA), 4,806 votes; and Dzintars Zaķis (V), 17,937 votes.

===== 2011 =====
Results of the 2011 parliamentary election held on 17 September 2011:

Party		Votes	%	Seats
Harmony Centre	SC	60,784	52.63%	8
Zatlers' Reform Party	ZRP	15,787	13.67%	2
Union of Greens and Farmers	ZZS	14,436	12.50%	2
Unity	V	11,608	10.05%	2
National Alliance	NA	5,350	4.63%	1
Latvia's First Party/Latvian Way	LPP/LC	3,904	3.38%	0
For Human Rights in a United Latvia	ЗаПЧЕЛ	1,608	1.39%	0
People's Control	TK	530	0.46%	0
For a Presidential Republic	PPR	497	0.43%	0
Latvian Social Democratic Workers' Party	LSDSP	394	0.34%	0
Last Party	PP	340	0.29%	0
Christian Democratic Union	KDS	248	0.21%	0
Valid votes		115,486	100.00%	15
Rejected votes		1,210	1.04%	
Valid envelopes		116,696	99.87%	
Rejected envelopes		149	0.13%	
Total polled		116,845	49.34%	
Registered electors		236,812		

The following candidates were elected: Rihards Eigims (ZZS), 14,654 votes; Gunārs Igaunis (ZRP), 17,258 votes; Marjana Ivanova-Jevsejeva (SC), 64,705 votes; Aleksandrs Jakimovs (SC), 65,586 votes; Jānis Klaužs (ZZS), 14,833 votes; Jānis Lāčplēsis (V), 14,316 votes; Inese Laizāne (NA), 6,704 votes; Jeļena Lazareva (SC), 66,115 votes; Aleksejs Loskutovs (V), 15,395 votes; Vladimirs Nikonovs (SC), 65,458 votes; Ivans Ribakovs (SC), 72,683 votes; Dmitrijs Rodionovs (SC), 65,825 votes; Raimonds Rubiks (SC), 67,810 votes; Jānis Tutins (SC), 70,959 votes; and Juris Viļums (ZRP), 17,552 votes.

===== 2010 =====
Results of the 2010 parliamentary election held on 2 October 2010:

Party		Votes	%	Seats
Harmony Centre	SC	59,281	46.26%	8
Union of Greens and Farmers	ZZS	20,844	16.26%	3
Unity	V	19,231	15.01%	2
For a Good Latvia	PL	15,387	12.01%	2
National Alliance	NA	3,958	3.09%	1
For Human Rights in a United Latvia	ЗаПЧЕЛ	3,661	2.86%	0
Responsibility – Social Democratic Alliance of Political Parties	ATBILDĪBA	1,259	0.98%	0
For a Presidential Republic	PPR	983	0.77%	0
Made in Latvia	RL	931	0.73%	0
Last Party	PP	832	0.65%	0
Christian Democratic Union	KDS	820	0.64%	0
People's Control	TK	548	0.43%	0
Daugava – For Latvia	ZRP	420	0.33%	0
Valid votes		128,155	100.00%	16
Rejected votes		1,871	1.44%	
Valid envelopes		130,026	99.86%	
Rejected envelopes		182	0.14%	
Total polled		130,208	54.64%	
Registered electors		238,287		

The following candidates were elected: Imants Jānis Bekešs (PL), 16,267 votes; Aleksejs Burunovs (SC), 62,905 votes; Rihards Eigims (ZZS), 20,164 votes; Sergejs Fjodorovs (SC), 62,650 votes; Aleksandrs Jakimovs (SC), 63,096 votes; Jānis Klaužs (ZZS), 21,835 votes; Inese Laizāne (NA), 4,183 votes; Aleksejs Loskutovs (V), 26,611 votes; Vladimirs Nikonovs (SC), 64,327 votes; Ivans Ribakovs (SC), 71,182 votes; Dmitrijs Rodionovs (SC), 62,053 votes; Raimonds Rubiks (SC), 64,539 votes; Kārlis Šadurskis (V), 20,552 votes; Staņislavs Šķesters (ZZS), 21,733 votes; Rita Strode (PL), 18,177 votes; and Jānis Tutins (SC), 69,362 votes.

==== 2000s ====
===== 2006 =====
Results of the 2006 parliamentary election held on 7 October 2006:

Party		Votes per district								Total votes	%	Seats
Party		Balvi	Daugav- pils City	Daugav- pils	Krās- lava	Ludza	Preiļi	Rēzek- ne City	Rēzek- ne	Total votes	%	Seats
Harmony Centre	SC	1,030	11,535	2,141	3,291	2,788	2,071	8,603	5,400	36,859	27.81%	5
People's Party	TP	2,774	1,454	1,281	1,313	2,895	5,135	1,811	2,181	18,844	14.22%	3
Latvia's First Party/Latvian Way	LPP/LC	1,224	8,922	3,576	1,132	1,047	955	1,153	824	18,833	14.21%	3
Union of Greens and Farmers	ZZS	2,653	828	1,963	2,379	1,874	2,324	1,540	3,198	16,759	12.65%	2
For Human Rights in a United Latvia	ЗаПЧЕЛ	410	4,411	935	1,150	1,520	971	670	680	10,747	8.11%	1
New Era Party	JL	1,140	791	953	930	796	2,219	841	1,023	8,693	6.56%	1
Latvian Social Democratic Workers' Party	LSDSP	493	3,071	975	541	469	827	336	529	7,241	5.46%	0
For Fatherland and Freedom/LNNK	TB/LNNK	1,794	424	446	325	425	711	637	562	5,324	4.02%	1
Motherland		63	2,385	1,171	276	124	129	137	109	4,394	3.32%	0
New Democrats	NJD	151	87	107	215	103	369	100	123	1,255	0.95%	0
All for Latvia!		94	66	113	62	89	201	52	110	787	0.59%	0
Māra's Land		92	143	98	85	96	88	90	85	777	0.59%	0
Pensioners and Seniors Party	PSP	78	74	51	98	83	108	90	149	731	0.55%	0
Our Land Party		23	32	52	86	47	40	22	59	361	0.27%	0
Social Fairness Party	STP	21	59	19	45	77	25	15	24	285	0.22%	0
Eurosceptics		15	58	33	32	30	36	25	41	270	0.20%	0
Fatherland Union	TS	22	20	19	17	11	15	7	16	127	0.10%	0
Latvian's Latvia National Political Defence Organisation		11	31	13	18	14	12	13	8	120	0.09%	0
National Power Union	NSS	14	15	18	12	12	11	15	20	117	0.09%	0
Valid votes		12,102	34,406	13,964	12,007	12,500	16,247	16,157	15,141	132,524	100.00%	16
Rejected votes										1,067	0.80%	
Valid envelopes										133,591	99.85%	
Rejected envelopes										200	0.15%	
Total polled										133,791	55.64%	
Registered electors										240,473		

The following candidates were elected: Vitālijs Aizbalts (LPP/LC), 20,944 votes; Juris Boldāns (TB/LNNK), 6,559 votes; Jānis Dukšinskis (LPP/LC), 20,963 votes; Jānis Eglītis (TP), 19,971 votes; Sergejs Fjodorovs (SC), 39,125 votes; Aleksandrs Golubovs (SC), 39,754 votes; Sarmīte Ķikuste (JL), 9,416 votes; Jānis Klaužs (TP), 19,746 votes; Anatolijs Mackevičs (LCC/LP), 20,212 votes; Miroslav Mitrofanov (ЗаПЧЕЛ), 12,881 votes; Ivans Ribakovs (SC), 43,577 votes; Anta Rugāte (TP), 20,101 votes; Staņislavs Šķesters (ZZS), 19,374 votes; Jānis Tutins (SC), 41,944 votes; Gunārs Upenieks (ZZS), 17,519 votes; and Aleksejs Vidavskis (SC), 41,250 votes.

===== 2002 =====
Results of the 2002 parliamentary election held on 5 October 2002:

Party		Votes per district								Total votes	%	Seats
Party		Balvi	Daugav- pils City	Daugav- pils	Krās- lava	Ludza	Preiļi	Rēzek- ne City	Rēzek- ne	Total votes	%	Seats
For Human Rights in a United Latvia	ЗаПЧЕЛ	1,927	18,047	4,481	5,591	6,076	3,822	10,412	7,351	57,707	36.79%	9
Union of Greens and Farmers	ZZS	2,385	699	1,721	1,496	1,412	2,100	1,600	3,668	15,081	9.62%	2
New Era Party	JL	2,045	1,957	1,822	1,223	1,429	3,203	1,660	1,737	15,076	9.61%	2
Light of Latgale	LG	59	9,656	2,752	773	232	818	310	145	14,745	9.40%	0
People's Party	TP	2,186	855	1,212	958	1,537	2,867	778	1,182	11,575	7.38%	2
Latvia's First Party	LPP	1,440	942	937	889	1,052	1,778	976	1,546	9,560	6.10%	1
Latvian Way	LC	1,082	1,008	1,001	716	1,467	1,652	546	891	8,363	5.33%	0
Latvian Social Democratic Workers' Party	LSDSP	750	1,535	533	579	645	1,286	1,085	1,206	7,619	4.86%	0
For Fatherland and Freedom/LNNK	TB/LNNK	1,523	550	450	456	642	982	693	611	5,907	3.77%	1
Social Democratic Welfare Party	SDLP	65	1,593	512	369	146	223	366	213	3,487	2.22%	0
Social Democratic Union	SDS	293	296	203	361	199	396	258	208	2,214	1.41%	0
Russian Party		123	582	237	189	153	156	231	246	1,917	1.22%	0
Political Alliance "Centre"		163	32	30	93	370	157	252	192	1,289	0.82%	0
Freedom Party	BP	24	290	165	152	32	31	27	31	752	0.48%	0
Latvian Revival Party	LAP	58	29	39	65	49	55	34	52	381	0.24%	0
Latvians' Party	LP	38	41	32	35	31	88	13	45	323	0.21%	0
Māra's Land		54	31	31	37	34	27	35	29	278	0.18%	0
Latvian United Republican Party	LARP	4	35	9	61	4	28	41	17	199	0.13%	0
Progressive Centre Party	PCP	24	21	24	20	22	31	8	38	188	0.12%	0
Citizens' Union "Our Land"		29	20	29	14	34	14	15	19	174	0.11%	0
Valid votes		14,272	38,219	16,220	14,077	15,566	19,714	19,340	19,427	156,835	100.00%	17
Rejected votes										1,209	0.76%	
Valid envelopes										158,044	99.74%	
Rejected envelopes										419	0.26%	
Total polled										158,463	66.65%	
Registered electors										237,766		

The following candidates were elected: Aleksandrs Bartaševičs (ЗаПЧЕЛ), 68,646 votes; Martijans Bekasovs (ЗаПЧЕЛ), 66,627 votes; Sergejs Fjodorovs (ЗаПЧЕЛ), 65,853 votes; Aleksandrs Golubovs (ЗаПЧЕЛ), 66,494 votes; Sarmīte Ķikuste (JL), 16,008 votes; Vilis Krištopans (ZZS), 17,819 votes; Anatolijs Mackevičs (ЗаПЧЕЛ), 65,356 votes; Pāvels Maksimovs (ЗаПЧЕЛ), 66,383 votes; Andrejs Naglis (LPP), 10,781 votes; Ināra Ostrovska (JL), 16,049 votes; Ivans Ribakovs (ЗаПЧЕЛ), 67,554 votes; Anta Rugāte (TP), 12,604 votes; Staņislavs Šķesters (ZZS), 17,676 votes; Elita Šņepste (TP), 12,262 votes; Vjačeslavs Stepaņenko (ЗаПЧЕЛ), 67,320 votes; Pēteris Tabūns (TB/LNNK), 6,881 votes; and Aleksejs Vidavskis (ЗаПЧЕЛ), 66,572 votes.

==== 1990s ====
===== 1998 =====
Results of the 1998 parliamentary election held on 3 October 1998:

Party		Votes per district								Total votes	%	Seats
Party		Balvi	Daugav- pils City	Daugav- pils	Krās- lava	Ludza	Preiļi	Rēzek- ne City	Rēzek- ne	Total votes	%	Seats
National Harmony Party	TSP	1,437	19,692	4,349	4,994	5,348	3,485	11,553	7,381	58,239	35.84%	7
Latvian Way	LC	4,471	6,895	5,215	3,533	5,210	4,898	2,840	3,916	36,978	22.76%	5
Latvian Social Democratic Alliance	LSDA	1,860	1,882	1,153	1,534	1,842	2,592	1,785	2,323	14,971	9.21%	2
People's Party	TP	2,151	2,592	1,821	1,207	1,230	2,672	1,151	1,111	13,935	8.58%	2
New Party	JP	995	1,640	1,171	1,170	747	1,262	829	969	8,783	5.41%	1
For Fatherland and Freedom/LNNK	TB/LNNK	1,077	1,016	846	483	763	1,355	1,050	798	7,388	4.55%	1
Democratic Party "Saimnieks"		589	2,417	596	929	649	1,133	480	349	7,142	4.40%	0
Latvian Farmers' Union	LZS	678	201	393	674	295	481	179	700	3,601	2.22%	0
Workers' Party, Christian Democratic Union and Latvian Green Party	DP–KDS–LZP	450	515	364	337	336	785	210	505	3,502	2.16%	0
People's Movement for Latvia	TKL	708	76	256	275	564	640	102	338	2,959	1.82%	0
Latvian Revival Party	LAP	203	211	103	112	71	110	55	66	931	0.57%	0
Latvian Unity Party	LVP	74	50	92	185	115	131	82	195	924	0.57%	0
Popular Movement "Freedom"		103	116	71	71	58	51	47	64	581	0.36%	0
Conservative Party	KP	18	233	67	32	46	38	48	36	518	0.32%	0
Social Democratic Women's Organisation	SDSO	68	87	51	59	44	55	54	43	461	0.28%	0
Mara's Land	MZ	175	27	33	29	28	95	7	20	414	0.25%	0
Latvian National Democratic Party	LNDP	67	19	61	45	52	79	22	37	382	0.24%	0
National Progress Party	NPP	54	144	39	52	21	29	9	5	353	0.22%	0
Helsinki-86		55	21	24	19	14	23	9	15	180	0.11%	0
Democrats' Party	DP	17	29	23	24	20	13	12	22	160	0.10%	0
Latvian National Reform Party	LNRP	7	9	11	5	39	5	2	6	84	0.05%	0
Valid votes		15,257	37,872	16,739	15,769	17,492	19,932	20,526	18,899	162,486	100.00%	18
Rejected votes		118	408	130	100	114	143	187	110	1,310	0.80%	
Valid envelopes		15,375	38,280	16,869	15,869	17,606	20,075	20,713	19,009	163,796	99.56%	
Rejected envelopes										718	0.44%	
Total polled										164,514	69.36%	
Registered electors										237,197		

The following candidates were elected: Aleksandrs Bartaševičs (TSP), 71,821 votes; Martijans Bekasovs (TSP), 67,174 votes; Aleksandrs Golubovs (TSP), 67,632 votes; Roberts Jurdžs (TB/LNNK), 8,211 votes; Vanda Kezika (LC), 38,994 votes; Jānis Lāčplēsis (LC), 39,090 votes; Pāvels Maksimovs (TSP), 66,686 votes; Miroslav Mitrofanov (TSP), 69,014 votes; Aija Poča (LC), 40,557 votes; Anta Rugāte (TP), 14,865 votes; Antons Seiksts (LC), 38,748 votes; Jāzeps Šņepsts (TP), 14,961 votes; Helēna Soldatjonoka (LC), 39,259 votes; Leonards Stašs (LSDA), 16,670 votes; Imants Stirāns (JP), 9,193 votes; Oļegs Tolmačovs (TSP), 66,551 votes; Jānis Urbanovičs (TSP), 69,003 votes; and Osvalds Zvejsalnieks (LSDA), 16,681 votes.

===== 1995 =====
Results of the 1995 parliamentary election held on 30 September and 1 October 1995:

Party		Votes	%	Seats
Socialist Party of Latvia	LSP	26,414	15.83%	3
Democratic Party "Saimnieks"	DPS	25,895	15.52%	3
Latvian Way	LC	24,692	14.79%	3
People's Movement for Latvia	TKL	19,516	11.69%	2
National Harmony Party	TSP	18,193	10.90%	2
Latvian Unity Party	LVP	14,417	8.64%	2
Latvian Farmers' Union, Christian Democratic Union and Latgalian Labour Party	LZS-KDS-LDP	11,848	7.10%	2
For Fatherland and Freedom	TB	5,247	3.14%	1
Party of Russian Citizens in Latvia	ПргЛ	4,388	2.63%	0
Latvian National Conservative Party and Latvian Green Party	LNNK-LZP	4,281	2.56%	1
Labour and Justice Coalition: LDDP, LSDSP and LACAP	LDDP-LSDSP-LACAP	2,868	1.72%	0
Latvian Farmers' Union	LZS	1,898	1.14%	0
Political Association of the Underprivileged and Latvian Independence Party		1,757	1.05%	0
Popular Front of Latvia	LTF	1,632	0.98%	0
Political Union of Economists	TPA	1,509	0.90%	0
Democrats' Party	DP	732	0.44%	0
Latvian Liberal Party	LLP	713	0.43%	0
Citizens Union "Our Land" – Anti-Communist Union		632	0.38%	0
Latvian National Democratic Party	LNDP	270	0.16%	0
Valid votes		166,902	100.00%	19

The following candidates were elected: Pēteris Apinis (LC), 24,355 votes; Aleksandrs Bartaševičs (LSP), 31,635 votes; Martijans Bekasovs (LSP), 30,366 votes; Kārlis Čerāns (TKL), 20,245 votes; Aleksandrs Golubovs (LSP), 29,827 votes; Roberts Jurdžs (TB), 5,668 votes; Ernests Jurkāns (DPS), 31,027 votes; Viktors Kalnbērzs (LVP), 16,211 votes; Vilis Krištopans (LC), 24,211 votes; Andrejs Naglis (LZS-KDS-LDP), 12,100 votes; Anta Rugāte (LZS-KDS-LDP), 12,900 votes; Antons Seiksts (LC), 24,186 votes; Leonards Stašs (TSP), 19,950 votes; Viktors Stikuts (DPS), 26,401 votes; Jānis Strods (TKL), 20,721 votes; Pēteris Tabūns (LNNK-LZP), 5,151 votes; Leonards Teniss (DPS), 26,434 votes; Anatolijs Tučs (LVP), 16,036 votes; and Jānis Urbanovičs (TSP), 19,880 votes.

===== 1993 =====
Results of the 1993 parliamentary election held on 5 and 6 June 1993:

Party		Votes per district								Total votes	%	Seats
Party		Balvi	Daugav- pils City	Daugav- pils	Krās- lava	Ludza	Preiļi	Rēzek- ne City	Rēzek- ne	Total votes	%	Seats
Latvian Way	LC	8,776	5,179	5,766	5,472	8,199	10,284	5,628	9,121	58,425	27.62%	7
Harmony for Latvia	SL	1,883	13,515	4,253	5,317	6,443	3,722	8,456	5,694	49,283	23.30%	5
Equal Rights	Р	1,246	12,890	3,029	2,086	3,248	2,429	3,806	5,186	33,920	16.03%	4
Latvian Farmers' Union	LZS	2,680	2,594	3,914	3,227	1,683	3,260	1,155	2,605	21,118	9.98%	2
Latvian National Independence Movement	LNNK	1,865	1,151	954	804	1,919	2,479	1,069	1,282	11,523	5.45%	1
Christian Democratic Union	KDS	1,560	1,903	1,568	1,105	806	1,858	754	1,125	10,679	5.05%	1
Russian National Democratic List		188	1,998	681	552	626	672	496	395	5,608	2.65%	0
For Fatherland and Freedom	TB	422	475	461	532	603	519	486	585	4,083	1.93%	0
Popular Front of Latvia	LTF	743	963	398	487	319	410	220	268	3,808	1.80%	0
Democratic Center Party of Latvia	DCP	401	803	551	241	310	474	333	344	3,457	1.63%	0
Latvian Social Democratic Workers' Party	LSDSP	134	1,124	335	566	69	278	62	65	2,633	1.24%	0
Democratic Labour Party of Latvia	LDDP	107	285	142	200	89	130	61	71	1,085	0.51%	0
Anti-Communist Union		96	202	139	113	80	113	53	96	892	0.42%	0
Latvia's Happiness		129	135	90	80	89	141	95	75	834	0.39%	0
Green List		119	146	89	124	62	106	93	78	817	0.39%	0
Republican Platform		186	91	55	202	76	114	28	41	793	0.37%	0
Economic Activity League		82	122	88	74	50	133	36	57	642	0.30%	0
Conservatives and Peasants		60	97	84	66	51	83	20	81	542	0.26%	0
Citizens Union "Our Land"		72	101	95	70	39	73	32	43	525	0.25%	0
Latvian Liberal Party	LLP	30	84	50	47	46	46	31	36	370	0.17%	0
Independents' Union		29	51	21	102	16	28	15	23	285	0.13%	0
Latvian Unity Party	LVP	15	66	28	36	9	25	15	25	219	0.10%	0
Valid votes		20,823	43,975	22,791	21,503	24,832	27,377	22,944	27,296	211,541	100.00%	20
Rejected votes		412	928	499	694	897	1,069	331	614	5,444	2.51%	
Valid envelopes		21,235	44,903	23,290	22,197	25,729	28,446	23,275	27,910	216,985	100.00%	

The following candidates were elected: Martijans Bekasovs (Р), 35,501 votes; Aleksandrs Bartaševičs (Р), 35,924 votes; Vilnis Edvīns Bresis (SL), 48,559 votes; Imants Daudišs (LC), 55,284 votes; Galina Fedorova (Р), 38,078 votes; Irēna Folkmane (SL), 48,865 votes; Ernests Jurkāns (SL), 50,876 votes; Jānis Jurkāns (SL), 68,688 votes; Andris Ķesteris (LC), 52,759 votes; Jānis Kokins (LZS), 20,965 votes; Vilis Krištopans (LC), 52,307 votes; Janīna Kušnere (LNNK); 10,612 votes; Andris Līgotnis (LC), 52,926 votes; Voldemārs Novakšāns (LZS), 22,407 votes; Andris Piebalgs (LC), 52,788 votes; Anta Rugāte (KDS), 11,562 votes; Antons Seiksts (LC), 52,902 votes; Leonards Stašs (SL), 51,028 votes; Filips Stroganovs (Р), 36,755 votes; and Jānis Vaivads (LC), 52,784 votes.

==== 1930s ====
===== 1931 =====
Results of the 1931 parliamentary election held on 3 and 4 October 1931:

Party		Votes per county				Total votes	%	Seats
Party		Daugav- pils	Jaun- latgale	Ludza	Rēzek- ne	Total votes	%	Seats
Christian Peasants and Catholics	KZK	24,692	10,252	11,436	21,033	67,413	27.18%	7
Latgallian Farmers Progressive Association	LZPA	16,634	8,305	9,573	14,283	48,795	19.68%	5
Russian Old Believers Working People's Voters	РС	8,082	184	789	8,666	17,721	7.15%	2
Latvian Social Democratic Workers' Party	LSDSP	5,982	2,366	4,175	3,023	15,546	6.27%	2
Leftist Workers and Farm Labourers	KSDZ	6,348	918	2,751	2,599	12,616	5.09%	1
Union of Russian Employees of Latvian Parishes and Districts	OPOД	863	5,797	2,063	1,833	10,556	4.26%	1
Orthodox Voters	PV	1,564	5,191	2,355	1,056	10,166	4.10%	1
Association of Russian Peasants and Russian Public Workers	РКО	340	7,151	507	300	8,298	3.35%	1
Latvian Farmers' Union	LZS	2,342	3,356	673	545	6,916	2.79%	1
Latvian Polish Union Polish-Catholics	ZPwŁ	4,455	116	902	1,289	6,762	2.73%	1
Agudas Israel		4,237	457	738	1,217	6,649	2.68%	1
Latgallian Latvian Union and Land Ploughmen	LLAZAP	3,483	1,645	315	439	5,882	2.37%	1
Latvian New Farmers and Small Landowners Party	LJSP	2,529	2,154	362	373	5,418	2.18%	1
Ceire Cion		3,273	192	831	978	5,274	2.13%	0
"Bund" in Latvia		3,276	174	539	1,055	5,044	2.03%	0
Polish-Catholics		3,653	58	134	357	4,202	1.69%	0
Old Believers		1,686	24	339	1,808	3,857	1.56%	0
Progressive Alliance and Democratic Centre		2,105	829	310	542	3,786	1.53%	0
Latgallian Land Ploughmen, Radicals and Soldier Liberators		241	175	359	781	1,556	0.63%	0
Party of Former Money Depositors		1,002	290	42	208	1,542	0.62%	0
Valid votes		96,787	49,634	39,193	62,385	247,999	100.00%	25
Rejected votes						2,205	0.88%	
Valid envelopes						250,204	99.78%	
Rejected envelopes						551	0.22%	
Total polled						250,755		

==== 1920s ====
===== 1928 =====
Results of the 1928 parliamentary election held on 6 and 7 October 1928:

Party		Votes per county				Total votes	%	Seats
Party		Daugav- pils	Jaun- latgale	Ludza	Rēzek- ne	Total votes	%	Seats
Christian Peasant and Catholic Party	KZKP	17,776	7,329	9,098	13,027	47,230	20.16%	5
Progressive People's Union	PTA	10,538	4,322	5,029	9,560	29,449	12.57%	3
Latgallian Democratic Farmers' Union	LDZA	7,855	4,773	3,937	9,337	25,902	11.06%	3
Latvian Social Democratic Workers' Party	LSDSP	9,619	6,511	5,229	3,993	25,352	10.82%	3
United Old Believers	AV	7,797	158	688	7,806	16,449	7.02%	2
Union of Russian Employees of Latvian Parishes and Districts	OPOД	1,346	7,936	4,006	1,304	14,592	6.23%	2
Latgallian Independent Socialist Party	LNSP	6,110	326	788	2,287	9,511	4.06%	1
Latvian Polish-Catholic Union	ZPwŁ	6,111	143	868	1,430	8,552	3.65%	1
Latvian Farmers' Union	LZS	2,512	3,971	339	489	7,311	3.12%	1
Latgallian Social Democratic Peasants' and Workers' Party	LSDZSP	256	537	3,829	1,705	6,327	2.70%	1
Ceire Cion	CC	3,448	361	1,024	1,358	6,191	2.64%	1
Latgallian Latvian Association and Land Plowing Party	LLAZAP	3,441	1,601	311	500	5,853	2.50%	1
"Bund" in Latvia		3,335	173	625	1,169	5,302	2.26%	1
Latvian New Farmers and Small Landowners Party	LJSP	1,560	1,824	258	1,135	4,777	2.04%	0
Orthodox, Old Believers and United Russian Organizations	П	1,580	954	1,127	1,032	4,693	2.00%	0
Russian Farmers Union		154	3,436	140	246	3,976	1.70%	0
Agudas Israel		2,529	211	365	667	3,772	1.61%	0
Latgallian Russian Peasants and Stateless Persons		313	91	264	1,400	2,068	0.88%	0
Latgallian Independent Farmers and Workers		181	530	178	1,033	1,922	0.82%	0
Democratic Centre	DC	702	248	218	218	1,386	0.59%	0
People's Labour Party		213	630	38	351	1,232	0.53%	0
Radical Democrats		162	73	71	568	874	0.37%	0
All-Latvian National Assembly		239	542	42	31	854	0.36%	0
Jewish Economic Bloc		595	26	32	14	667	0.28%	0
Valid votes		88,372	46,706	38,504	60,660	234,242	100.00%	25
Rejected votes						2,897	1.22%	
Valid envelopes						237,139	99.79%	
Rejected envelopes						491	0.21%	
Total polled						237,630		

===== 1925 =====
Results of the 1925 parliamentary election held on 3 and 4 October 1925:

Party		Votes per county					Total votes	%	Seats		
Party		Daugav- pils	Jaun- latgale	Ludza	Rēzek- ne	County comm-ission	Total votes	%	Con.	Com.	Tot.
Latvian Social Democratic Workers' Party	LSDSP	16,244	7,064	11,224	8,138	67	42,737	19.89%	5	0	5
Party of Catholics and Christian Peasants	KKZP	13,585	5,129	6,453	10,109	33	35,309	16.44%	4	0	4
Latgallian Democratic Party	LDP	6,418	2,929	3,463	6,899	13	19,722	9.18%	2	0	2
Old Believers	V	6,965	171	772	7,839	14	15,761	7.34%	2	0	2
Latgallian Labour Party–Latgale Union of Smallholders and Stateless Persons	LDP-LMBS	2,984	2,689	3,411	6,511	24	15,619	7.27%	2	0	2
Latgallian Farmers Party	LZP	6,235	2,089	1,795	2,782	14	12,915	6.01%	2	0	2
Russian Parishes and Public Employees	OPOД	1,042	6,474	1,339	625	5	9,485	4.42%	1	0	1
Polish-Catholic Latvian Union of Poles	ZPwŁ	6,675	177	951	1,076	4	8,883	4.14%	1	0	1
Latvian Farmers' Union	LZS	2,515	5,159	332	494	4	8,504	3.96%	1	0	1
Latgallian Non-Partisan Union	LBS	956	463	816	5,008	4	7,247	3.37%	1	0	1
Agudas Israel		3,999	399	583	908	19	5,908	2.75%	1	0	1
Union of Orthodox Voters and Russian Organisations	П	1,083	1,575	1,529	444	6	4,637	2.16%	1	0	1
"Bund" in Latvia		2,578	71	496	1,162	3	4,310	2.01%	1	0	1
Ceire Cion	CC	2,073	110	455	844	3	3,485	1.62%	1	0	1
Latgallian Small Landholders, Landless and Land Ploughmen		1,890	807	145	475	14	3,331	1.55%	0	0	0
Latgallian United Workers, Craftsmen, Small Landholders and Labour Intelligentsia		1,901	50	95	203	1	2,250	1.05%	0	0	0
Democratic Centre	DC	1,108	392	166	321	2	1,989	0.93%	0	0	0
National Union	NA	1,038	234	222	278	6	1,778	0.83%	0	0	0
Latvian Belarusian Landless Farmers, Workers and Small Peasant Citizens		1,246	9	305	17	4	1,581	0.74%	0	0	0
Social Democrats Mensheviks	SDM	298	677	45	95	1	1,116	0.52%	0	0	0
Christian National Union	KNS	647	236	35	83	0	1,001	0.47%	0	0	0
National Farmers' Union	NZS	745	192	28	24	1	990	0.46%	0	0	0
Latvian New Farmers' Union	LJS	592	196	41	132	0	961	0.45%	0	0	0
Latvian New Farmers-Small Landowners Party	LJSP	446	156	124	191	0	917	0.43%	0	0	0
Latgallian Group of Working People		61	169	332	354	0	916	0.43%	0	0	0
Union for Peace, Order and Production	MKRA	241	63	117	265	1	687	0.32%	0	0	0
German-Baltic Party in Latvia	DbPL	401	30	56	102	0	589	0.27%	0	0	0
Histadruth-Hacionith		224	32	237	12	1	506	0.24%	0	0	0
Congress of Destroyed Areas and Agricultural Association		332	38	19	49	1	439	0.20%	0	0	0
Zionist Organisation Mizrachi		213	19	34	171	1	438	0.20%	0	0	0
Latvian Labour Union	LDS	215	38	45	24	1	323	0.15%	0	0	0
Independent Non-Partisan Economic Group of Latgallia		14	11	141	11	1	178	0.08%	0	0	0
Jewish National Democratic Party		108	10	5	38	1	162	0.08%	0	0	0
Union of Latvian Democrats	LDS	23	15	43	65	0	146	0.07%	0	0	0
Valid votes		85,095	37,873	35,854	55,749	249	214,820	100.00%	25	0	25
Rejected votes											
Valid envelopes											
Rejected envelopes											
Total polled											
Registered electors		110,154	51,639	46,536	76,118		284,447				

===== 1922 =====
Results of the 1922 parliamentary election held on 7 and 8 October 1922:

Party		Votes per county				Total votes	%	Seats		
Party		Daugav- pils	Ludza	Rēzek- ne	County comm-ission	Total votes	%	Con.	Com.	Tot.
Latgallian Christian Peasant's Union	LKZS	16,652	15,904	14,557	89	47,202	24.29%	6	0	6
Latvian Social Democratic Workers' Party	LSDSP	14,760	13,541	7,375	64	35,740	18.39%	4	0	4
Latgallian Small Landless Farmers–Latgallian Labour Party	LMB-LDP	8,223	10,324	9,074	58	27,679	14.24%	4	0	4
United Polish Parties	ZPwŁ	7,142	1,049	1,346	4	9,541	4.91%	1	0	1
United List of Russians	ОРС	1,533	5,465	2,470	51	9,519	4.90%	2	0	2
Latvian Central Committee of Old Believers	LVCK	3,734	402	5,007	9	9,152	4.71%	1	0	1
Latvian Farmers' Union	LZS	2,958	4,660	1,040	17	8,675	4.46%	1	0	1
Latgallian Farmers Party	LZP	4,166	2,080	2,246	30	8,522	4.39%	1	0	1
Union of Social Democrats – Mensheviks and Rural Workers	SDML	3,481	3,949	999	33	8,462	4.35%	1	0	1
Latgallian People's Unions	LTA	369	1,306	4,730	17	6,422	3.30%	1	0	1
Agudas Israel		3,536	677	1,452	0	5,665	2.91%	1	0	1
Ceire Cion	CC	2,147	414	768	0	3,329	1.71%	1	0	1
Non-Partisan National Centre	BNC	1,252	1,016	576	9	2,853	1.47%	0	0	0
"Bund" in Latvia		1,569	269	571	0	2,409	1.24%	1	0	1
United Jewish National Bloc	EANB	1,105	902	222	1	2,230	1.15%	0	0	0
Latgallian Workers' Union	LDA	1,118	239	551	10	1,918	0.99%	0	0	0
Belarusian in Latgallia		673	798	76	1	1,548	0.80%	0	0	0
Latvian New Farmers' Union	LJS	718	421	175	1	1,315	0.68%	0	0	0
Independent Russian Association		631	312	65	2	1,010	0.52%	0	0	0
German-Baltic Party in Latvia	DbPL	376	137	122	0	635	0.33%	0	0	0
Union of Latgallian Villagers, Landowners and Tenants		86	145	230	6	467	0.24%	0	0	0
Jewish People's Party		15	19	13	0	47	0.02%	0	0	0
Valid votes		76,244	64,029	53,665	402	194,340	100.00%	25	0	25
Rejected votes						3,109	1.57%			
Valid envelopes						197,449				
Rejected envelopes										
Total polled										
Registered electors		88,092	91,277	68,377		247,746				
