= Latgolas Taisneiba =

- January 1, 1949 issue of Latgolas Taisneiba
- Editor: Dominīks Kaupužs
- Founded: August 4, 1945
- Ceased publication: September 5, 1952
- Political alignment: Communist
- Language: Latgalian language
- City: Daugavpils
- Country: Soviet Union
- Sister newspapers: Sotsialisticheskiy Put'

Latgolas Taisneiba ('Latgalian Truth') was a Latgalian language (or in Upper Latvian Dialect per later Soviet bibliography) newspaper published from Daugavpils, Latvian SSR between August 4, 1945 and September 5, 1952. Until January 8, 1950 it was an organ of the Daugavpils County Committee of the Communist Party (Bolsheviks) of Latvia and the Daugavpils County Executive Committee, thereafter an organ of the Communist Party Daugavpils District Committee and the Daugavpils District Soviet. On December 10, 1946 the deputy editor of Latgolas Taisneiba, Dominīks Kaupužs, was promoted to editor of the newspaper.

All in all 1,159 issues of Latgolas Taisneiba were published. The day after the last issue of Latgolas Taisneiba was published it was replaced by the newspaper Sarkanais Karogs ('Red Flag').
