= Veinberg =

Veinberg is a surname. Notable people with the surname include:

- Joel Veinberg (1922–2011), Latvian and Soviet orientalist
- Pyotr Veinberg (1831–1908), Russian poet
- Emīlija Veinberga (1896–1989), Latvian politician
- Tatjana Veinberga (1943–2008), Latvian volleyball player
- Victoria Veinberg Filanovsky (born 1995), Israeli gymnast.
