= Leila Rasima =

Latvian politician (born 1987)

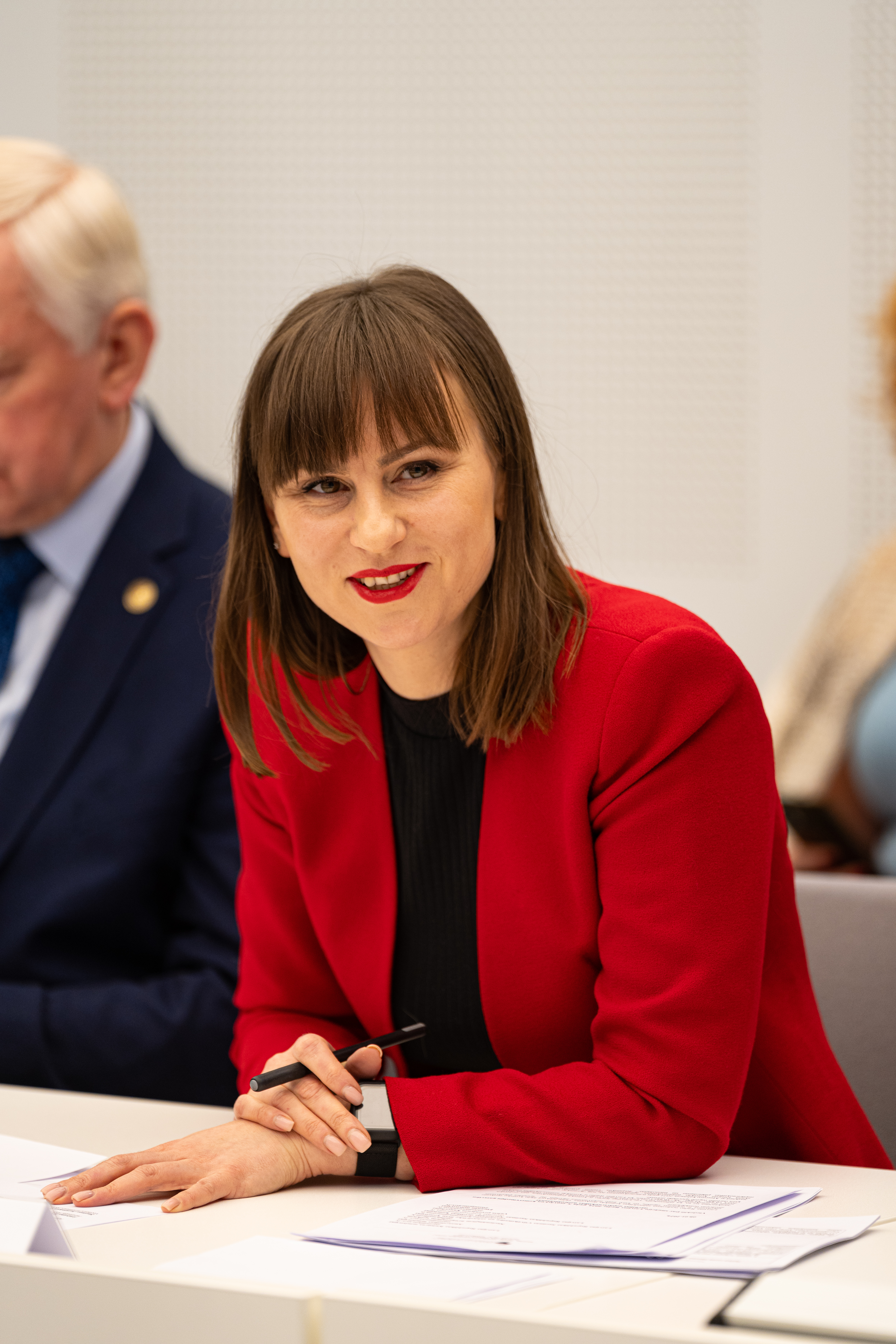
- Rasima in 2024

Member of the Saeima
- Incumbent
- Assumed office 1 November 2022
- Constituency: Latgallia

Personal details
- Born: 20 January 1987 (age 39)
- Party: The Progressives
- Education: Rēzekne Academy of Technology

Leila Rasima (born 20 January 1987) is a Latvian politician of The Progressives who was elected member of the Saeima in 2022. In the 2021 municipal elections, she was elected councillor of Rēzekne.

Rasima obtained a bachelor's degree in English language teaching and a master's degree in career counseling from Rēzekne Academy of Technology.
