= Golubov =

Golubov (Russian: Го́лубов; masculine) or Golubova (Голубова; feminine) is a Russian surname:

- Aleksandrs Golubovs (1959–2010), Latvian politician
- Dmitri Golubov (born 1985), Russian professional footballer
- Dmitri Golubov (born 1983), Ukrainian politician
