= Juris Viļums =

Latvian politician (born 1982)

- Viļums in 2023

Member of the Saeima
- Incumbent
- Assumed office 1 November 2022
- Constituency: Latgallia
- In office 17 October 2011 – 6 November 2018
- Constituency: Latgallia

Personal details
- Born: 13 April 1982 (age 44)
- Party: Latvian Association of Regions (since 2020)

Juris Viļums (born 13 April 1982) is a Latvian politician. He has been a member of the Saeima since 2022, having previously served from 2011 to 2018. He has served as deputy group leader of the United List since 2022.
