= University of Daugavpils =

University in Latvia

Coordinates: 55°52′08″N 26°30′56″E

Daugavpils University
- Daugavpils Universitāte
- Former names: Daugavpils Pedagogical Institute
- Motto: Latin: Scientia Vinces
- Motto in English: Through knowledge you win
- Type: Public
- Established: 1921; 105 years ago
- Rector: Arvīds Barševskis
- Administrative staff: 229
- Students: 2,043 (2020)
- Location: 13 Vienības Street, Daugavpils, Latvia
- Campus: Urban
- Website: www.du.lv

University rankings

Regional – Overall
- QS Emerging Europe and Central Asia: 241-250 (2022)

The University of Daugavpils (Latvian: Daugavpils Universitāte, DU) is a public university in Daugavpils, Latvia, and the largest regional university in the country.

== History ==
The university was founded in 1921 as a teachers’ college. Its director between 1923 and 1940 was Valērija Seile.

Chronology of nomenclature:

- 1921–1923 Daugavpils Teachers' Seminary (Daugavpils skolotāju seminārs)
- 1923–1952 Daugavpils State Teachers' Institute (Daugavpils Valsts skolotāju institūts)
- 1952–1993 Daugavpils Pedagogical Institute (Daugavpils Pedagoģiskais institūts)
- 1993–2001 Daugavpils Pedagogical University (Daugavpils Pedagoģiskā Universitāte)

DU received its present name on 13 October 2001. It has become the largest educational institution in Eastern Latvia and is a member of the European University Association and EU²S², the European Union association of universities of small member states. Since 2004 it has benefited from EU Structural Funds for campus expansion and renovation.

On 1 March 2018 the Daugavpils Medical College (lv) was integrated into the university as an autonomous institution. The college was established in 1945.

It is planned to merge the university with the University of Latvia.

== Organisation ==
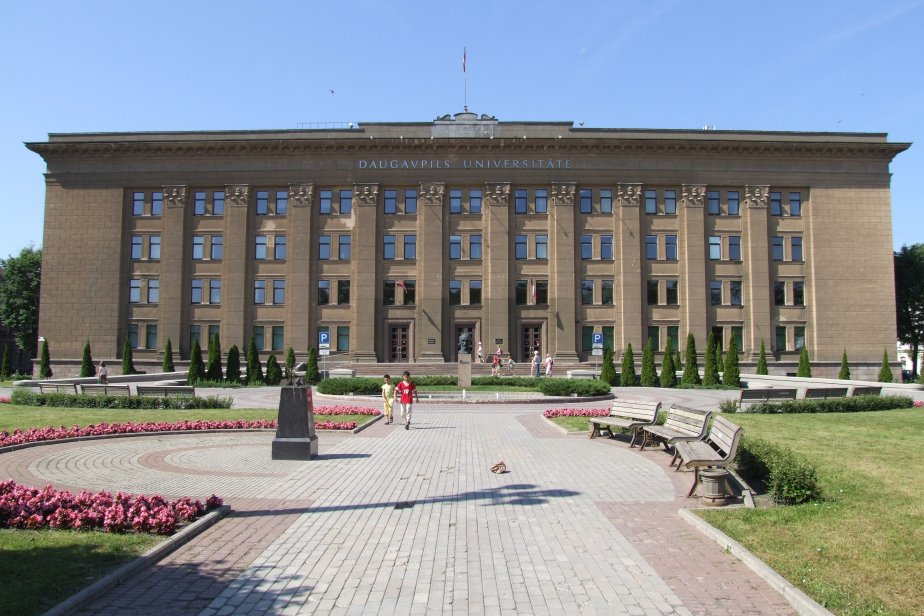
Main building on Vienības iela (Unity Street) erected in 1956.

=== Faculties and departments ===
The University consists of five faculties:

- Faculty of Humanities

- Department of English Philology and Translatology
- Department of Russian and Slavic Linguistics
- Department of Latvian Literature and Culture
- Department of Latvian Language
- Department of Foreign Languages
- Department of History

- Faculty of Social Sciences

- Department of Economics and Sociology
- Department of Social Psychology
- Department of Law

- Faculty of Natural Sciences and Mathematics

- Department of Information Science
- Department of Physics
- Department of Mathematics
- Department of Chemistry and Geography
- Department of Anatomy and Physiology

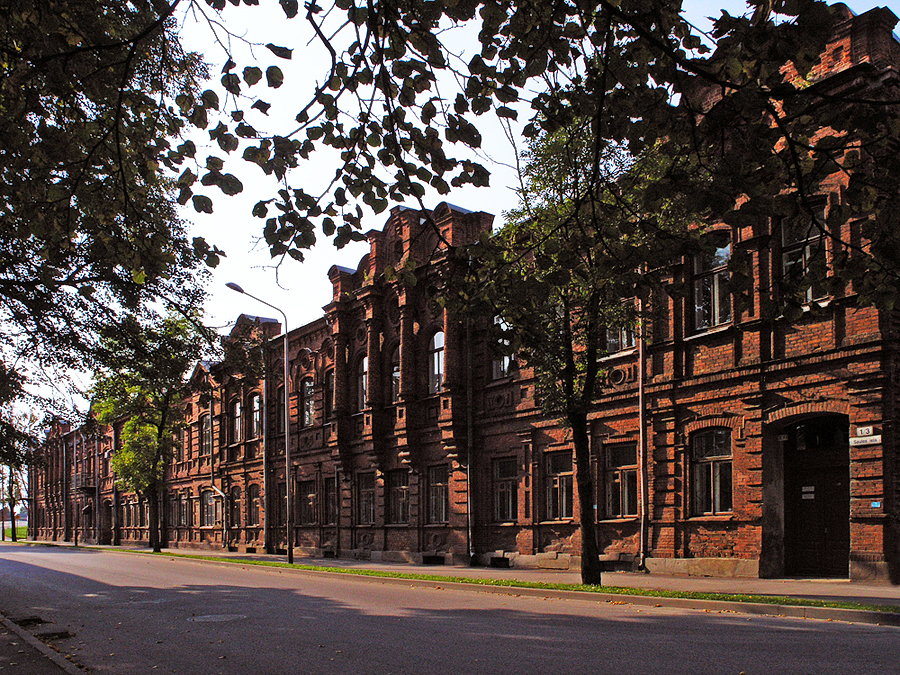
Faculty of Music and Art on Saules iela (Solar Street).

- Faculty of Music and Arts

- Department of Music

- Faculty of Education and Management

- Department of Pedagogy and Pedagogical Psychology
- Department of Sport

=== Institutes and centres ===
- Centre of Lithuanistics
- Centre of Russian Language and Culture
- Oral History Centre
- Regional German Language and Country Studies Centre for Further Education
- Guntis Liberts Innovative Microscopy Centre
- Institute of Ecology
- Institute of Systematic Biology
- Institute of Art

=== Daugavpils Medical College ===
This agency of the university offers study programs in:

- Nursing
- Physician assistance
- Social caregiving
- Social rehabilitation
- Nurse assistance
- Therapeutic massage

== Rectors ==
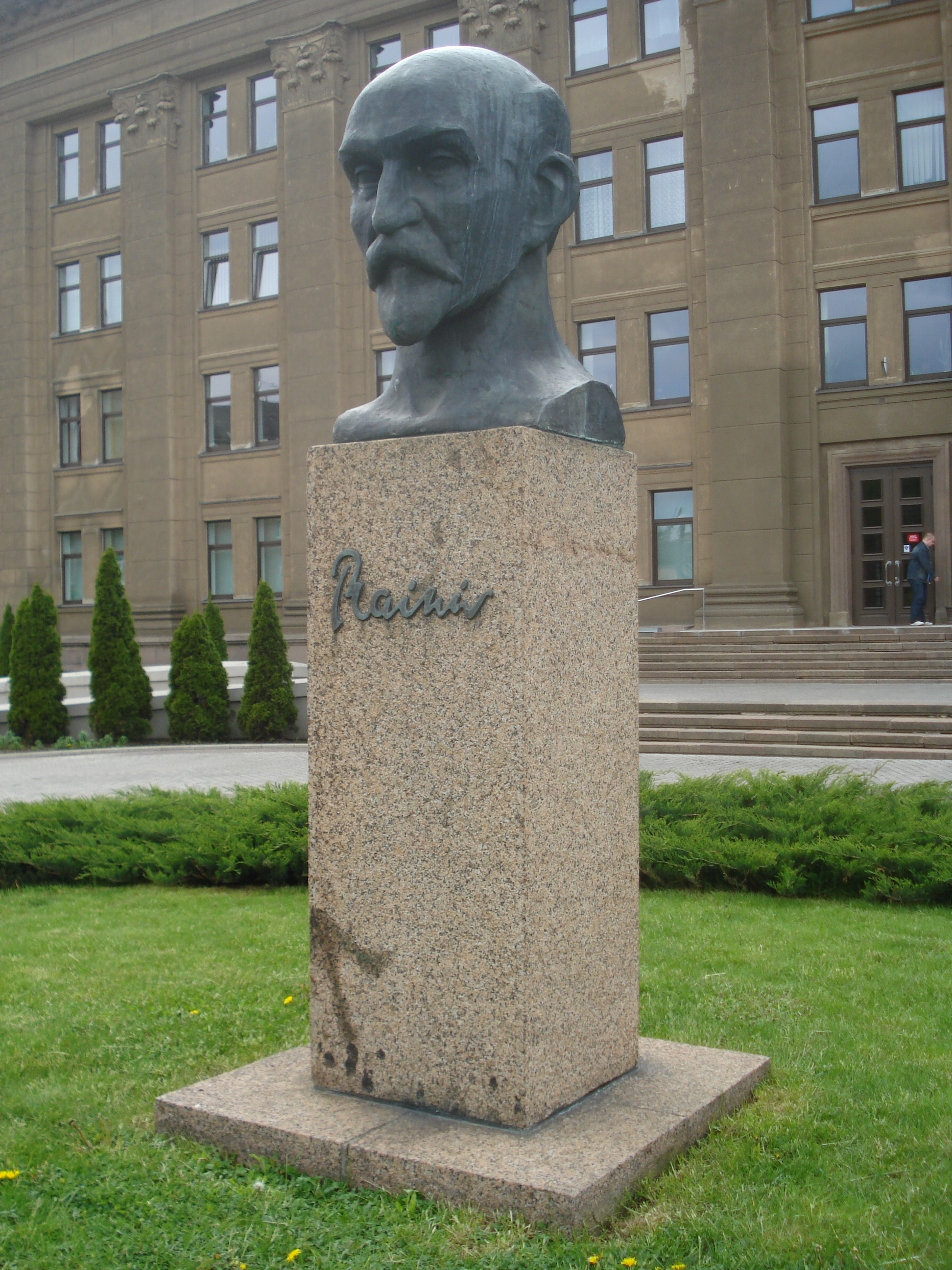
Bust of Rainis.

The following have served as university rectors/institute directors:

- Jānis Jirgens (1921–1922)
- Eižens Vietnieks (1922–1923)
- Valērija Seile (1923–1940)

Closed 1940–1944

- Leontijs Viškarevs (1944–1946)
- Vitālijs Pautovs (1946–1952)
- Ivans Petrovs (1952–1953)
- Krišs Grašmanis (1953–1958)
- Vitālijs Bauskis (1958–1962)
- Anna Kalnbērziņa (1962–1971)
- Gunārs Gulbis (1971–1977)
- Oļegs Roždestvenskis (1977–1992)
- Bruno Jansons (1992–1998)
- Jānis Pokulis (1998–2002)
- Zaiga Ikere (2002–2007)
- Arvīds Barševskis (lv) (2007–2018)
- Irēna Kokina (2018–2023)
- Arvīds Barševskis (2023–present)

== Enrollment ==
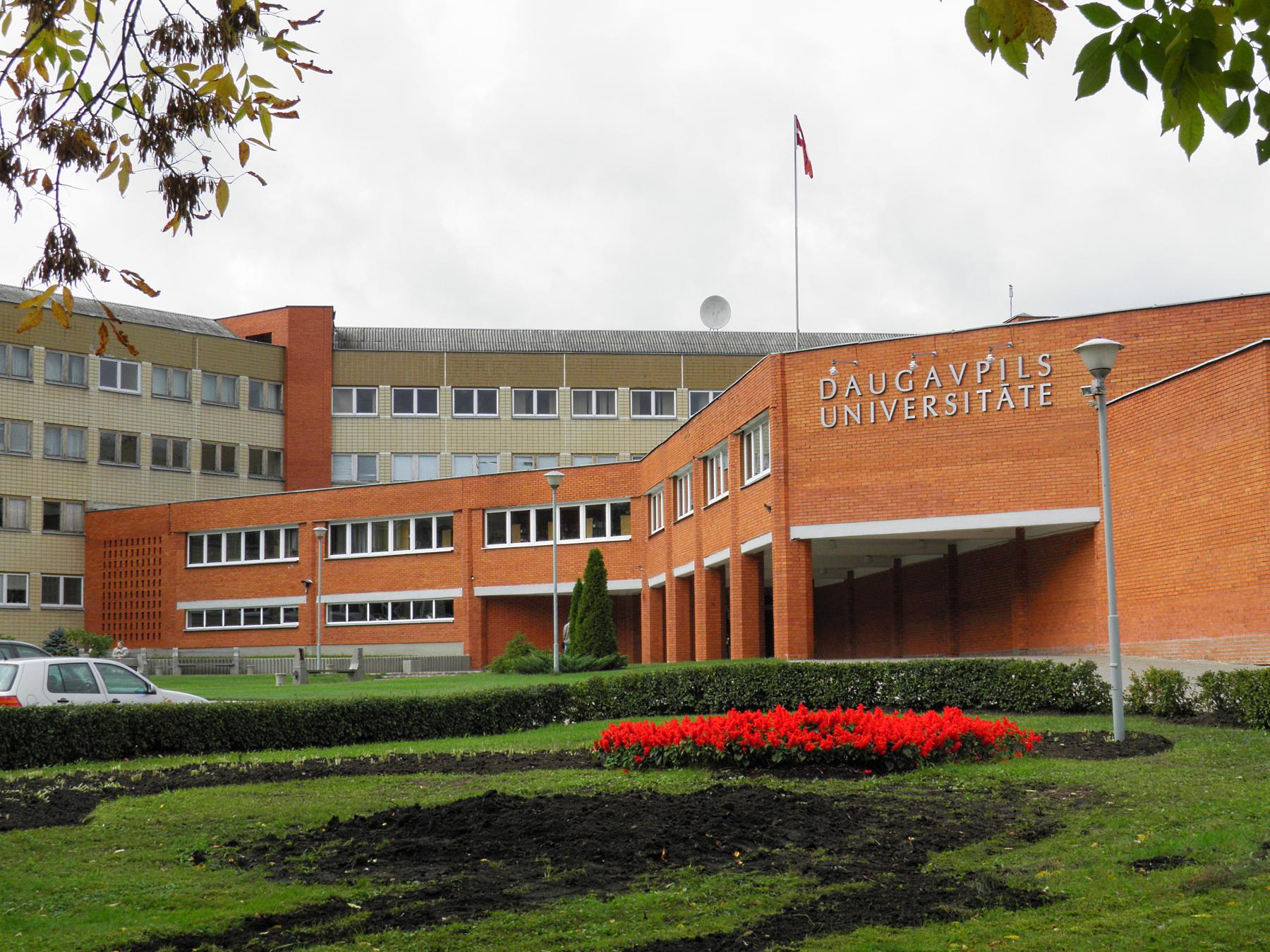
Building on Parādes iela erected in 1989, renovated in 2020.

In 2008 more than 4200 students were enrolled in study programs. A large Russian-speaking enrollment and faculty facilitates cooperation with universities outside of the European Union in the CIS.

Students can use Erasmus+ mobility options to study for one or two semesters at European partner universities. Students are able to receive funding from the Else Marie Tschermak Foundation in Denmark to study or conduct research abroad.

Student life is organised through the Students’ Council, the campus newspaper “Lai Top!” (Let it be!), the Latgale Students’ Centre, the Association of Young Scientists of Daugavpils University “DUJZA”, the Art Teachers' Union, the Health Care Centre and Natural Research and Environmental Education Centre. Students can also acquire a foreign language, take part in the students’ dance ensemble “Laima” and utilize a Sport Complex. Interested students have the opportunity to work in the research institutions and centres.

== Notable alumni ==
- Aleksandrs Kudrjašovs – metropolitan of the Latvian Orthodox Church
- Anastasija Grigorjeva – European freestyle wrestling champion and Olympian
- Marjana Ivanova-Jevsejeva – member of the Saeima and member of the board of Olainfarm
- Inese Laizāne – member of the Saeima and director of the Daugavpils Theatre
- Yakov Pliner – member of the Saeima
- Ivans Ribakovs – member of the Saeima
- Valērijs Buhvalovs – member of the Saeima
- Jānis Dukšinskis – member of the Saeima
- Dagnija Staķe – member of the Saeima, Minister of Welfare and Minister of Regional Development of Latvia

== Notable academics ==
- Joel Veinberg – orientalist and Jewish historian
- Jānis Brikmanis – zoologist

== See also ==
- Ilga Manor
