= Valērija Seile =

Latvian politician (1891-1970)

Valērija Seile (Latgalian: Valereja Seile; 1891–1970) was a Latvian politician, educator, historian, librarian and writer.

She was educated in St Petersburg. She returned to Latvia in 1916, was the secretary of the Provisional Land Council of Latgale in 1917-18 and tended to much of its daily business. She was a part of the People's Council in 1918–20, was elected to the Constitutional Assembly in 1920 and served as deputy minister of Education in 1922. Between 1923 and 1940, she was a professor in Daugavpils at the Daugavpils State Teachers' Institute.

== Works ==
- "Latgolas liktini bēgļu laikmetā. Latgalīšu bīdreibas paleiga kara upurem darbeiba" (1934)
- "Sistematiskais leidz 1935. godam latgalīšu izlūksnē izdūtūs grōmotu rōdeitōjs" (1935)
- "Grāmatas Latgales latviešiem. Latgaliešu dialektā izdoto grāmatu chronoloģiskais, sistemātiskais autoru un izdevēju rādītājs (1585.-1936.)" (1936)
- "Paidagogikas vēsture. I daļa" (1943)
