= Valery Bukhvalov =

Latvian politician

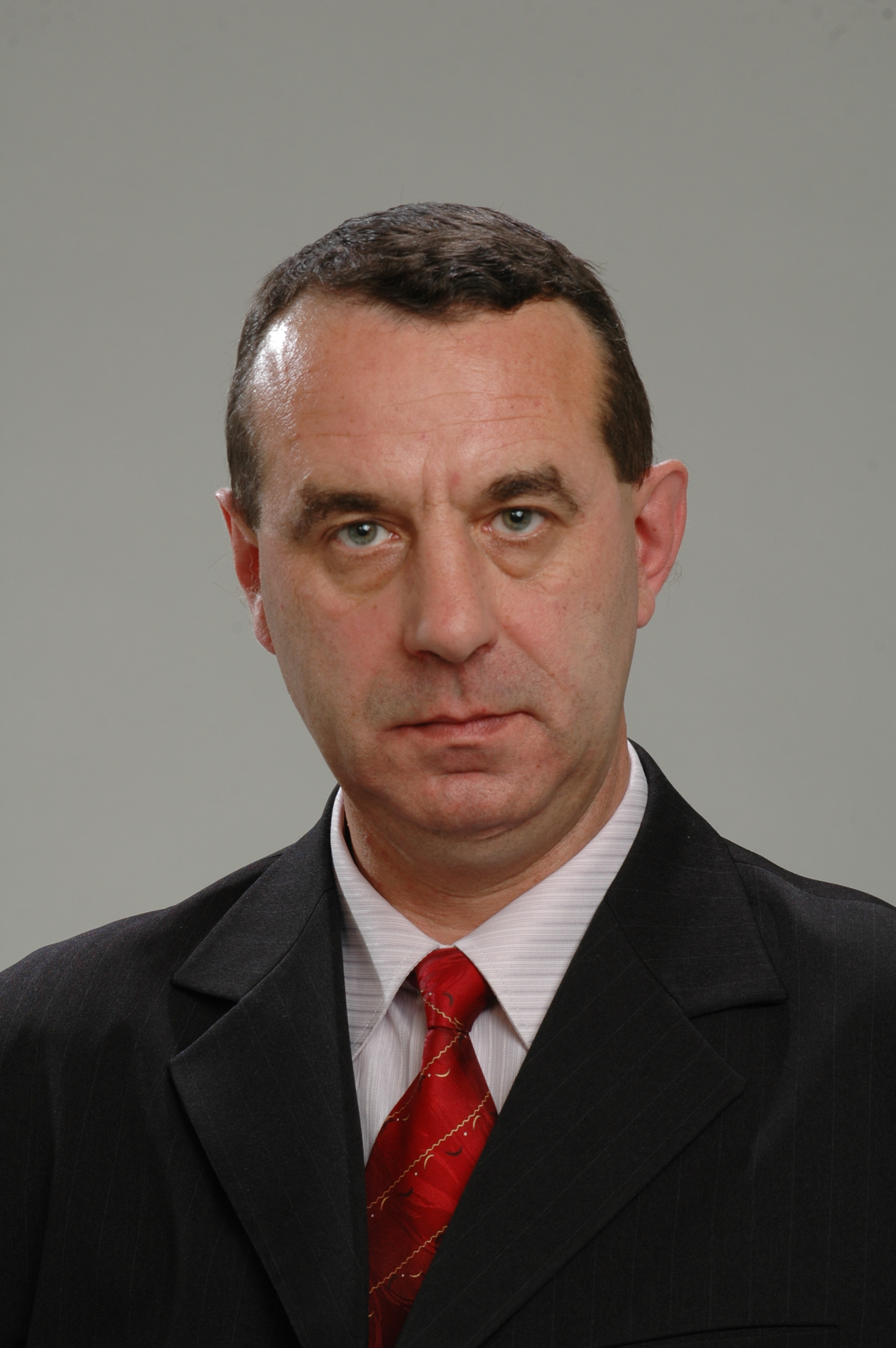

Valery Alekseevich Bukhvalov (Latvian: Valērijs Buhvalovs, Russian: Валерий Алексеевич Бухвалов; born 9 July 1957 in Rēzekne) is a Latvian Russian politician and pedagogue, member of 9th Saeima from ForHRUL.

== Biography ==
1988 — graduated from Daugavpils Institute of Pedagogy.

1988—1996 — teacher of biology in Jelgava secondary school Nr. 3, deputy headmaster.

1993 — received Candidat degree from Herzen's Leningrad State Institute of Pedagogy.

From 1995 — teacher of biology in the secondary school "Eureka", deputy headmaster.

1998—2006 — assistant of MP Yakov Pliner.

1998—2004 — teacher of biology in the pedagogical centre "Experiment".

2005—2006 — Jelgava city councillor.

2006 — elected member of Saeima.

== Books and brochures ==
1992 — Аналитическая экология: Учебное пособие для основной и средней школы

1997 — Воспитание личности в коллективе (co-authored with Y. Pliner)

1998 — Из истории естествознания (co-authored with N. Grīslis)

1999 — Латвийская школа евроэтнокультурного развития (co-authored with Y. Pliner)

2000 — Проблемы и перспективы интеграции учащихся школ национальных меньшинств в латвийское общество (co-authored with Y. Pliner)

2001 — Педагогическая экспертиза школы: Пособие для методистов, завучей и директоров школ (co-authored with Y. Pliner; later published in Latvian, too)

2001 — Общая методика развивающего обучения (Рига: Эксперимент)

2002 — Skolas izglītojošā vide (co-authored with Y. Pliner)

2003 — Основы творчества в профессиональной карьере (Рига: Эксперимент)

2004 — Антипедагогика реформы русских школ в Латвии (co-authored with Y. Pliner)

2005 — Политическая псевдореформа русских школ — плачевные перспективы (co-authored with Y. Pliner)

2006 — Качество образования в условиях реформы русских школ Латвии (co-authored with Y. Pliner)

2007 — Культурные аспекты повышения качества школьного образования (co-authored with Y. Pliner)

2008 — Реформа школ нацменьшинств в Латвии: анализ, оценка, перспективы (co-authored with Y. Pliner])

2008 — Интеграция общества и культурная автономия
