= Rēzekne county =

17th–20th century county in Latvia

Rēzekne county: Latvian: Rēzeknes apriņķis; Polish: powiat rzeżycki; Russian: Рѣжицкiй уѣздъ
- County of Latvia
- 1629–1949
- Coat of arms

- Map in 1940
- Capital: Rēzekne
- History
  - Established: 1629
  - Disestablished: 1949
Succeeded by
Rēzekne district

Rēzekne county (Latvian: Rēzeknes apriņķis) was a historic county in the Vitebsk Governorate, and in the Republic of Latvia, dissolved during the administrative territorial reform of the Latvian SSR in 1949. Its administrative centre was Rēzekne (Rzeżyca, Rezhitsa).

== History ==
Established in 1629 as one of the subdivisions of the Inflanty Voivodeship (powiat rzeżycki). In 1772, after the First Partition of Poland it became one of uyezds of Polotsk Governorate (Russian: Режицкий уезд, 1776—1796), later Belarusian Governorate (1796—1802) and Vitebsk Governorate (1802—1917) of the Russian Empire.

On 31 December 1917 Rezhitsky Uyezd, having a majority Latvian population, was transferred to Governorate of Livonia, becoming a part of the Latvian Soviet autonomy of Iskolat and a part of the Latvian Socialist Soviet Republic on 17 December 1918. After signing of the Latvian–Soviet Peace Treaty, Rēzeknes apriņķis was incorporated into the Republic of Latvia.

In 1949, Rēzeknes apriņķis was transformed into the Rēzeknes District (Rēzeknes rajons) of the Latvian SSR during the Soviet occupation of Latvia.

== Demographics ==
At the time of the Russian Empire Census of 1897, Rezhitsky Uyezd had a population of 136,445. Of these, 57.9% spoke Latvian, 23.9% Russian, 7.4% Yiddish, 5.4% Belarusian, 4.8% Polish, 0.4% German, 0.1% Lithuanian and 0.1% Romani as their native language.
