= Ilga Manor =

Manor in Latvia

- Selonia, Latvia
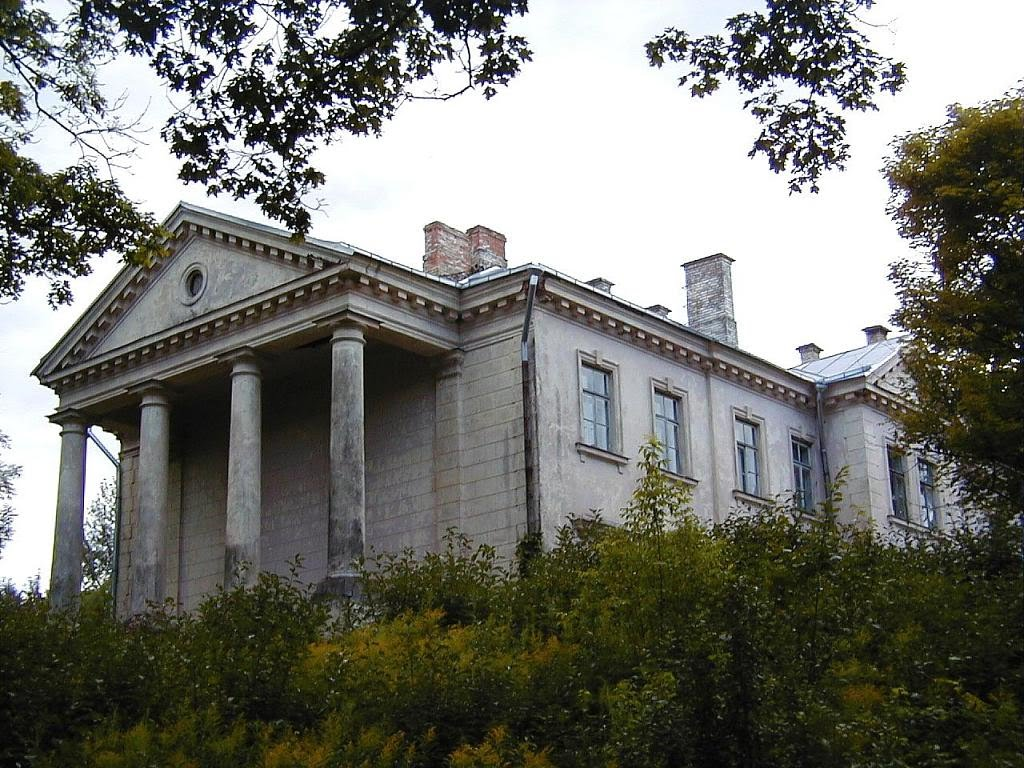
- Manor in 2001 prior to renovation.

Site information
- Type: Manor

Location
- Coordinates: 55.6911°N 26.7836°E

Ilga Manor (Latvian: Ilgas muiža) is a manor in Skrudaliena Parish, Augšdaugava Municipality in the Selonia region of Latvia. Located southeast of Daugavpils near the Belarusian border, it is currently used as a teaching site by the University of Daugavpils. Renovation of the building was completed in 2012 with the help of a grant from the European Regional Development Fund.

== History ==
The manor was built in the 1890s by Baltic German architect Wilhelm Neumann and used as a hunting lodge.

== See also ==
- List of palaces and manor houses in Latvia
