= Kaspars Melnis =

Latvian politician (born 1989)

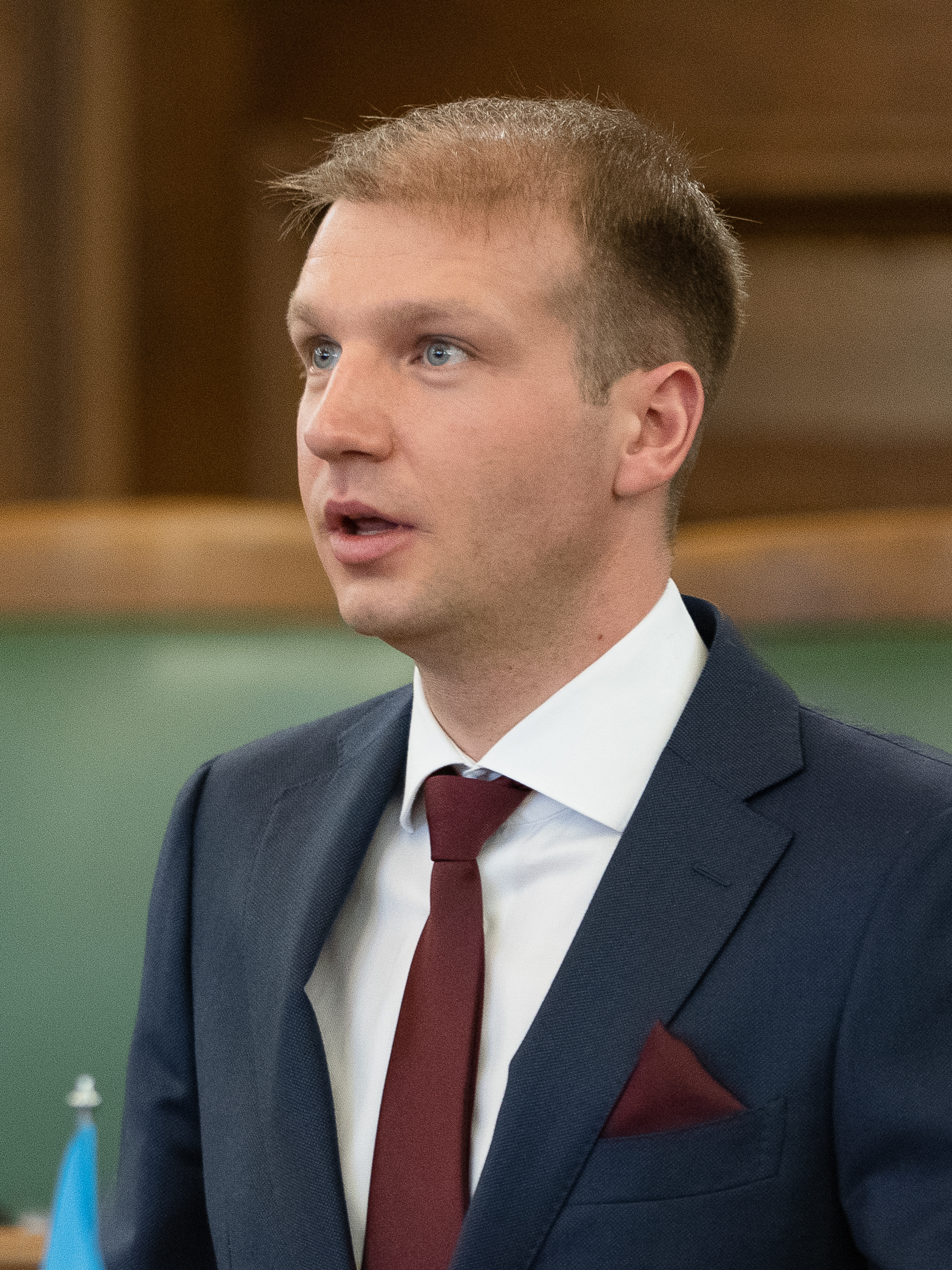
- Melnis in 2022

Minister for Climate and Energy
- Incumbent
- Assumed office 15 September 2023
- Prime Minister: Evika Siliņa
- Preceded by: Raimonds Čudars

Member of the Saeima
- In office 1 November 2022 – 20 September 2023
- Succeeded by: Valdis Maslovskis
- Constituency: Latgallia

Personal details
- Born: 28 March 1989 (age 37)
- Party: Latvian Farmers' Union

Kaspars Melnis (born 28 March 1989) is a Latvian politician of the Latvian Farmers' Union serving as Minister for Climate and Energy since 2023. He previously served as councillor of Rēzekne Municipality and as a member of the Saeima.
