= Preiļi district =

District of Latvia

Coordinates: 56°18′N 26°43′E

Preiļi
- District
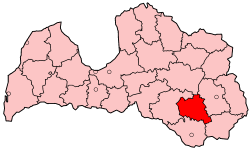
- Country: Latvia

Area
  - Total: 2,042 km^{2} (788 sq mi)

Population
  - Total: 37,743
  - Density: 18.48/km^{2} (47.87/sq mi)
- Website: preilirp.lv

Preiļi district (Latvian: Preiļu rajons) was an administrative division of Latvia, located in Latgale region, in the country's east. It bordered the former districts of Jēkabpils, Madona, Rēzekne, Krāslava and Daugavpils.

Districts were eliminated during the administrative-territorial reform in 2009.
