= Staņislavs Šķesters =

Latvian engineer and politician

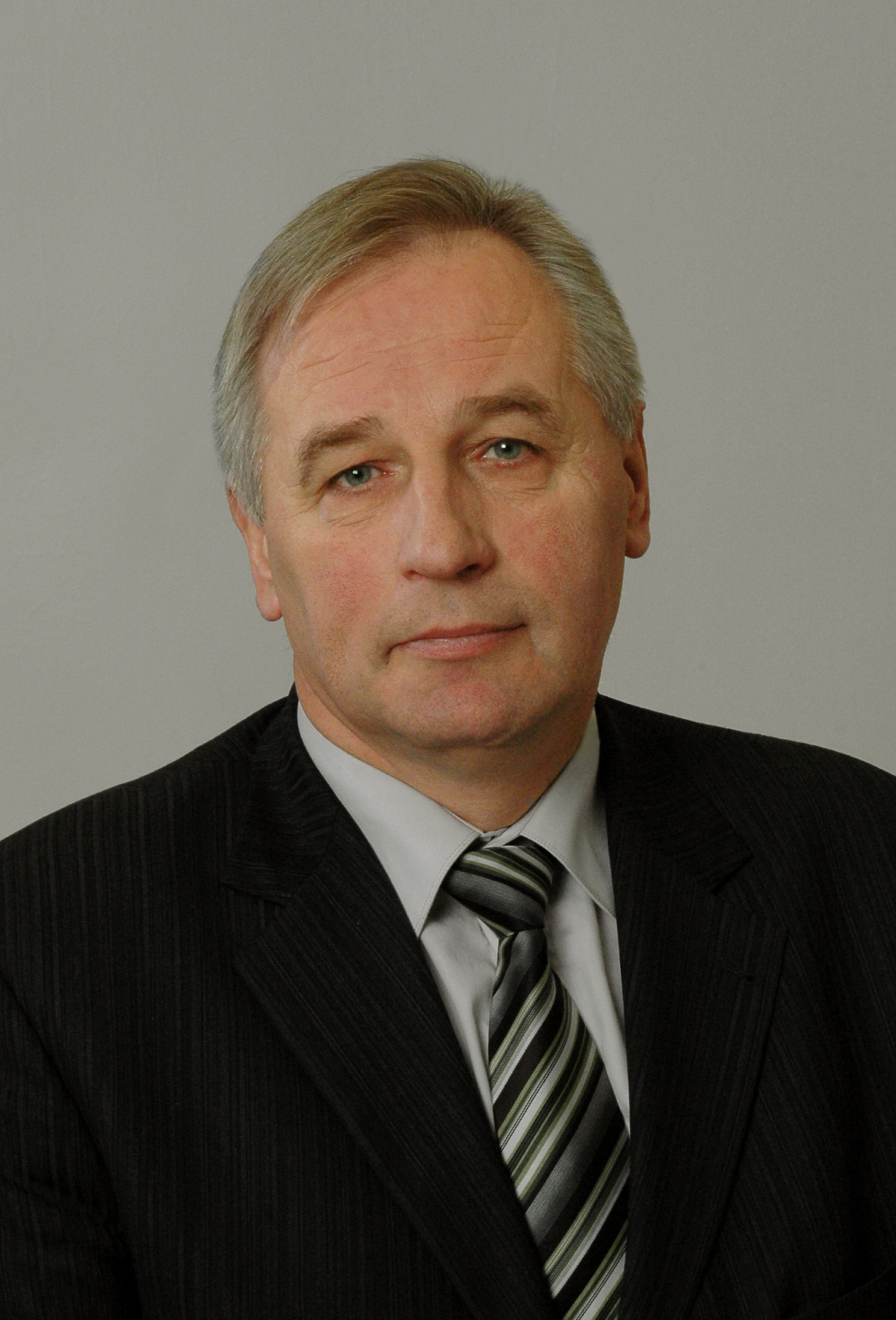

Personal details
- Born: December 17, 1958 (age 67) Latvian SSR (now Latvia)
- Party: Latvian Farmers' Union
- Education: Latvia University of Life Sciences and Technologies
- Occupation: Engineer and politician

Staņislavs Šķesters (born December 17, 1958) is a Latvian engineer and politician. He has served as a deputy in the 8th, 9th, and 10th Saeimas (Latvian Parliament). Since 2006, he has been the chairman of the Central Land Commission. He represents the political party Latvian Farmers' Union.

== Biography ==
In 1982, Šķesters graduated from the Latvia University of Life Sciences and Technologies with a specialization in engineering and mechanics.

=== Political career ===
From 1994 to 2002, he served as the Chairman of the Mākoņkalns Parish Council. During the 8th Saeima elections, he was elected as a deputy. In the 8th Saeima, he worked in the Committee on European Affairs and also served as the Chairman of the State Administration and Local Government Committee. In 2006, he participated in the 9th Saeima elections and was re-elected as a deputy. During this term, he also became the Chairman of the Central Land Commission. He has been a member of the State Administration and Local Government Committee as well as the Committee on European Affairs.

In 2009, he ran for the European Parliament elections but was not elected. In 2010, Shesters participated in the 10th Saeima elections and was elected as a deputy from the Latgale electoral district. In the 10th Saeima, he worked in the Foreign Affairs Committee and the European Affairs Committee. In 2011, he was one of the five deputies who nominated Andris Bērziņš as a candidate in the presidential elections, and Berzins was subsequently elected as the President of Latvia.

In the 11th Saeima elections, he ran as the number one candidate on the Union of Greens and Farmers (ZZS) list in the Latgale district but was not elected, conceding to Rihards Eigims and Jānis Klaužs. In February 2012, he was appointed as the executive director of the Zemgale Planning Region.

=== Private life ===
He is married and has six children. He resides in the Makonkalns Parish of Rezekne Municipality.
