= Jānis Tutins =

Latvian politician

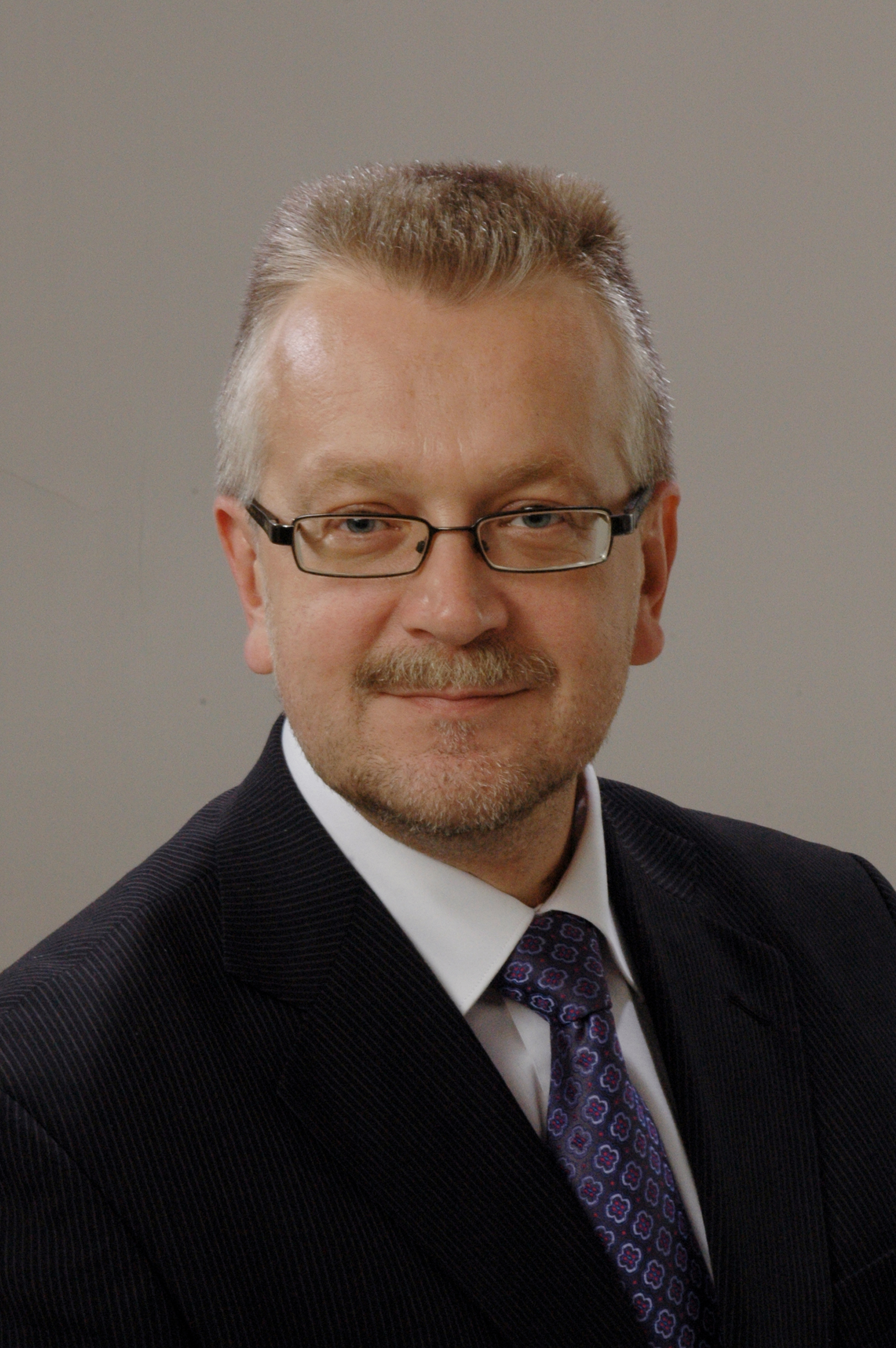

Deputy of the Saeima

Personal details
- Born: 23 June 1966 (age 59) Rēzekne, Latvian SSR
- Party: Harmony

Jānis Tutins (born 1966) is a Latvian politician. He is a member of Harmony and a deputy of the 9th, 10th, 11th and 12th Saeima. He began his current term in parliament on November 4, 2014.
