= Ivans Ribakovs =

Latvian politician

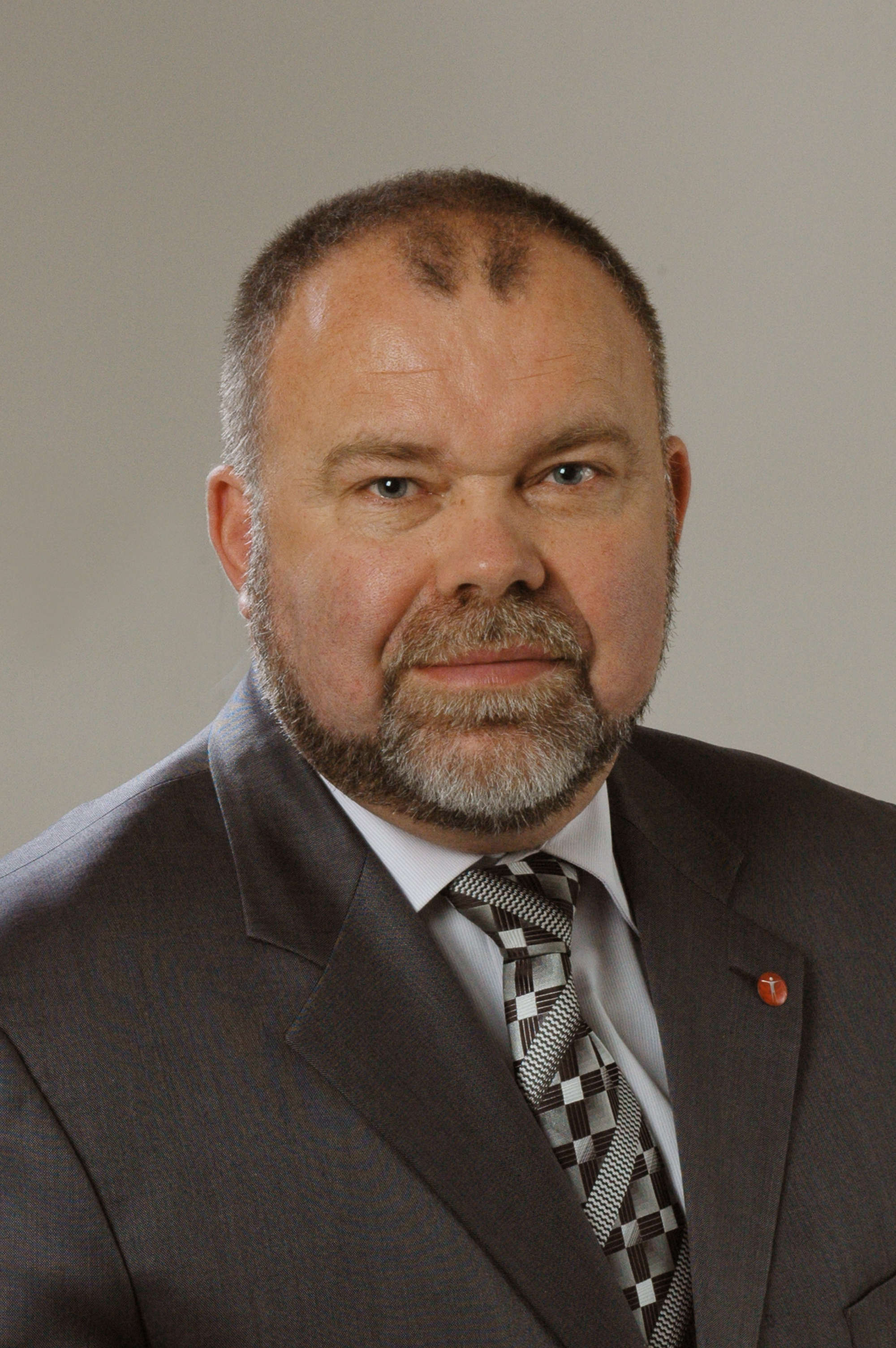

Deputy of the Saeima

Personal details
- Born: 29 June 1960 (age 66) Zarasai, Lithuanian SSR, (Now Lithuania)
- Party: Harmony
- Education: Daugavpils University

Ivans Ribakovs (born 1960) is a Latvian politician. He is a member of Harmony and a deputy of the 9th, 10th, 11th and 12th Saeima. He began his current term in parliament on November 4, 2014.
