= Daugavpils county =

Subdivision of Poland–Lithuania, Russian Empire, Latvia

Daugavpils county: Latvian: Daugavpils apriņķis; Polish: powiat dyneburski; Russian: Динабургcкiй уѣздъ
- County of Latvia
- 1621–1949
- Coat of arms

- Map in 1940
- Capital: Daugavpils
- History
  - Established: 1621
  - Disestablished: 1949
Succeeded by
Daugavpils district

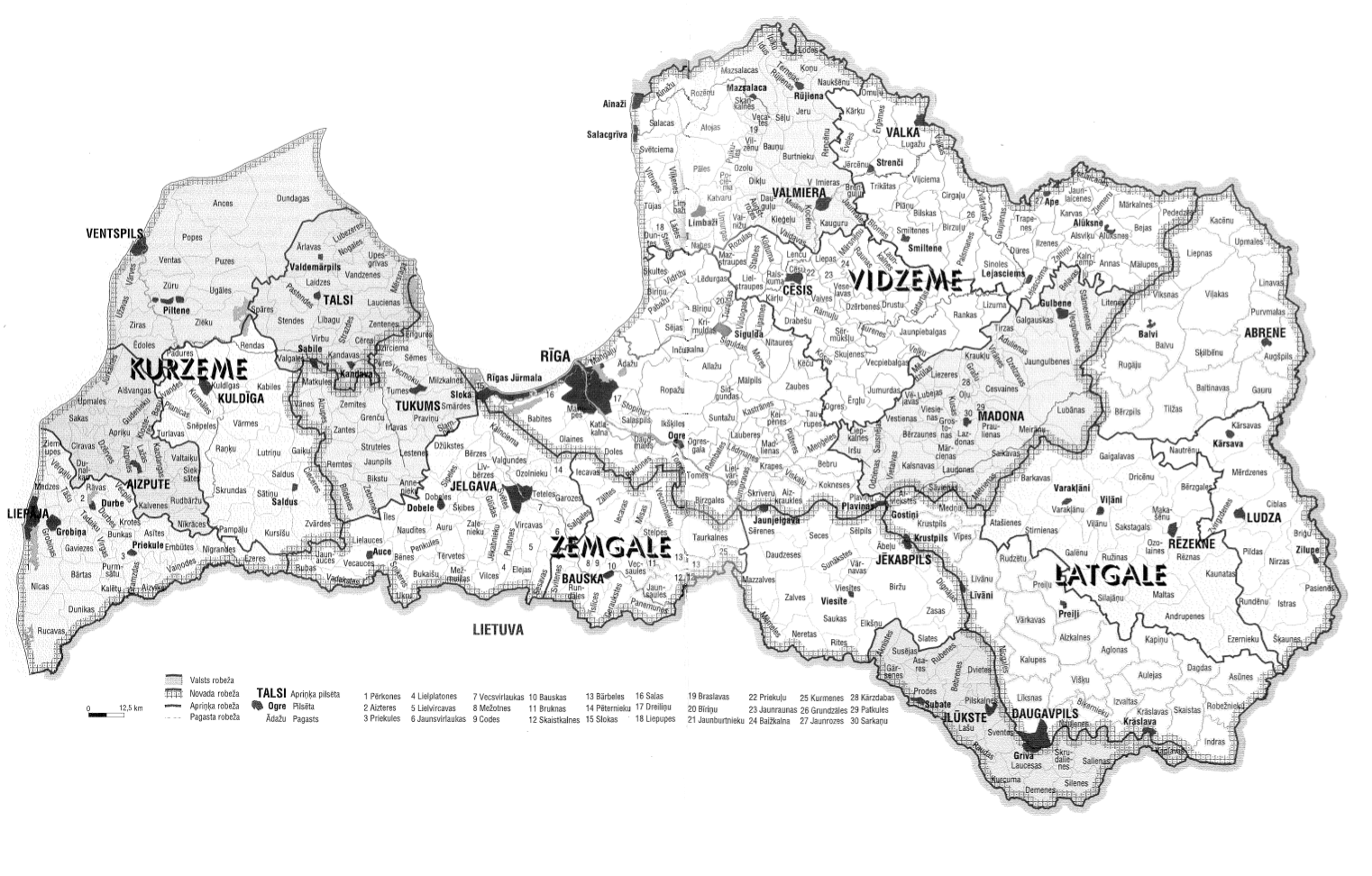
Daugavpils apriņķis on the map of Latvia (1938)

Daugavpils county (Latvian: Daugavpils apriņķis) was a historic county in Poland–Lithuania, the Vitebsk Governorate of the Russian Empire and in the Republic of Latvia, which was dissolved during the administrative territorial reform of the Latvian SSR in 1949. Its administrative centre was Daugavpils.

== History ==
Established in 1621 as one of the subdivisions of the Inflanty Voivodeship (powiat dyneburski) of the Polish–Lithuanian Commonwealth. In 1772, after the First Partition of Poland it became one of uyezds of Polotsk Governorate (Russian: Динабургский уезд, 1776–1796), later Belarusian Governorate (1796–1802) and Vitebsk Governorate (1802–1917) of the Russian Empire. In 1893, it was renamed to Dvinsk county.

On 31 December 1917 Daugavpils county, populated by mostly Latvians were transferred to Governorate of Livonia, becoming a part of the Latvian Soviet autonomy of Iskolat and a part of the Latvian Socialist Soviet Republic on 17 December 1918. After signing of the Latvian–Soviet Peace Treaty, Daugavpils county was fully incorporated into the Republic of Latvia.

In 1949, during the Soviet occupation of Latvia, Daugavpils county was merged with Ilūkste county and transformed into the Daugavpils district of the Latvian SSR.

== Demographics ==
At the time of the Russian Empire Census of 1897, Dvinsky Uyezd had a population of 237,023. Of these, 39.0% spoke Latvian, 20.0% Yiddish, 15.3% Russian, 13.8% Belarusian, 9.1% Polish, 1.8% German, 0.4% Lithuanian, 0.2% Tatar, 0.1% Romani and 0.1% Ukrainian as their native language.
