= Marjana Ivanova-Jevsejeva =

Latvian politician

Marjana Dademasch
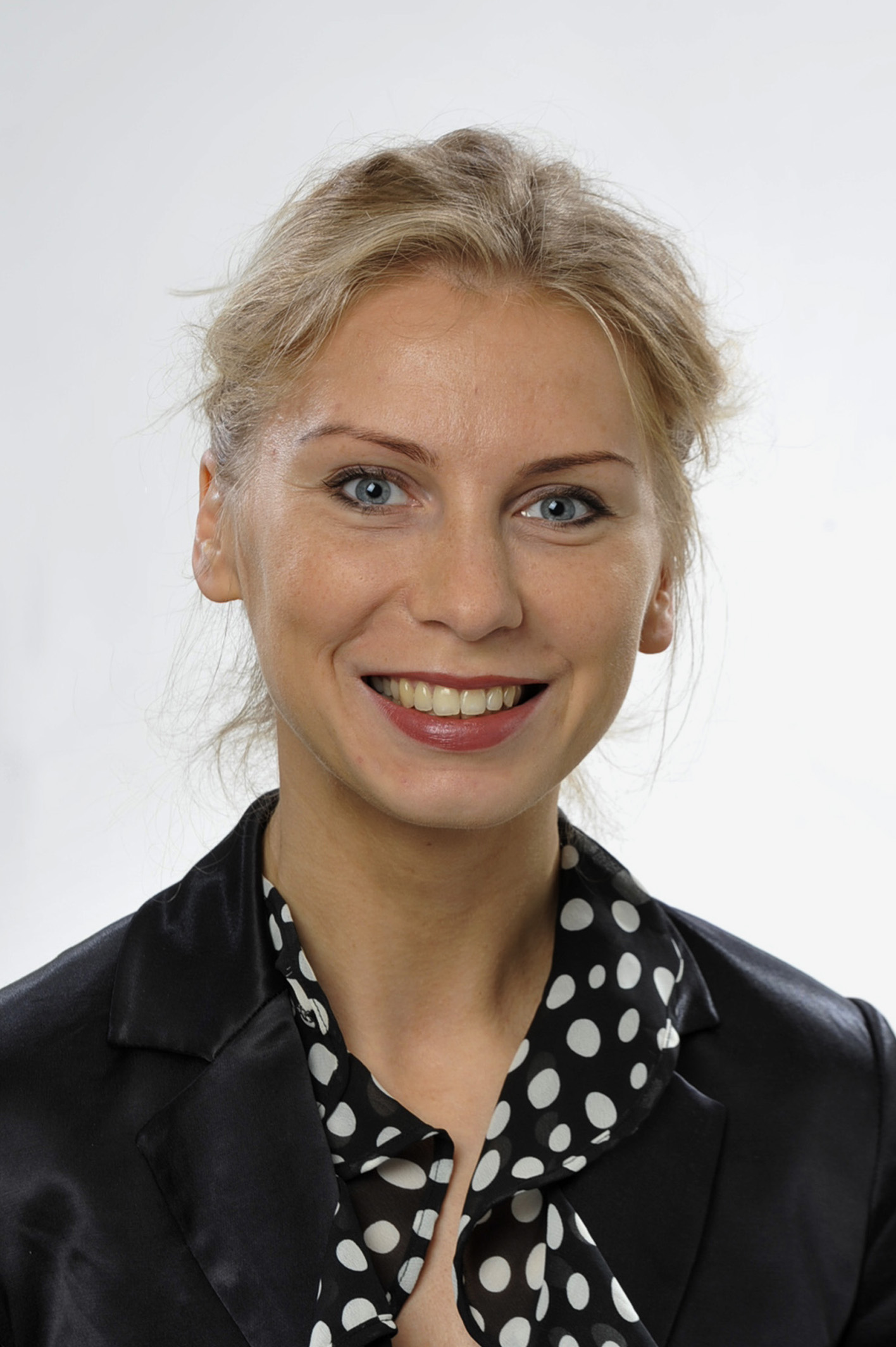

Deputy of the Saeima

Personal details
- Born: 1 September 1982 (age 43) Daugavpils, Latvian SSR
- Party: Harmony
- Education: Daugavpils University

Marjana Dademaša (born Marjana Ivanova-Jevsejeva in 1982) is a Latvian politician. She is a member of Harmony and was a deputy of the 12th Saeima until her resignation in 2015 to pursue a career at Olainfarm. Since June 2017 she is a member of the municipal council of Daugavpils, the second largest city in the country.
