= Joel Veinberg =

Jewish Russian historian and sociologist (1922-2011)

Joel Veinberg (Russian: Йоэль Пейсахович (Иоэл Песахович) Вейнберг, Latvian: Joels Veinbergs; (1922 in Riga – 2011 in Jerusalem), also known as Joel Weinberg, was a Latvian and Soviet orientalist and historian of Jewish origin.

He graduated from a high school with language of instruction in Hebrew in Latvia and started university studies in history. From 1941 to 1943 he was confined to the Riga Ghetto together with his family and was thereafter imprisoned by Nazi Germany until 1945 in concentration camps in Latvia and Germany (including Buchenwald). After the war Veinberg worked as a lecturer of history in the University of Latvia and later at the Daugavpils University.

Joel Veinberg was one of the few Jewish historians in the USSR who could work in the "inactual" (from the point of view of the Soviet officialdom) fields such as ancient Jewish history and culture. He published numerous works on the Ancient Orient («Человек в культуре древнего Ближнего Востока», М., 1986 ("Man and Culture in the Ancient Orient", published in Moscow)), Second Temple period and especially the Persian period, as well as on the Bible ("The Old Testament in the Light of Current Science", in Latvian, Riga, 1966).

Beginning in 1994 he worked at the Ben-Gurion University of the Negev as professor at the department of Bible and Ancient Orient.

== Sources ==
- Joel Veinberg, Electronic Jewish Encyclopedia
