= Rēzekne Academy of Technology =

Rēzekne Academy of Technologies
- Rēzeknes Tehnoloģiju akadēmija
- Established: 1993; 32 years ago
- Rector: Iveta Mietule
- Address: Atbrīvošanas aleja 115, Rēzekne, Latvia; 56°30′45″N 27°19′58″E
- Website: https://rta.lv/

Rezekne Academy of Technologies (Latvian: Rēzeknes Tehnoloģiju akadēmija) is an institution of higher education and scientific research in Rēzekne, Latvia. It is one of two Augstskola (literally 'high school,' cognate of Hochschule) based in Eastern Latvia.

== History ==
A teacher's college was established in Rēzekne in 1922. The Popular Front of Latvia supported the principle of further higher education in Latgale in the 1980s. Classes based on the University of Latvia began in 1991 and the Rēzeknes Augstskola was established officially in 1993. The current name was adopted in 2016. The former name was rendered Rezekne Higher Education Institution in English.

== Faculties ==
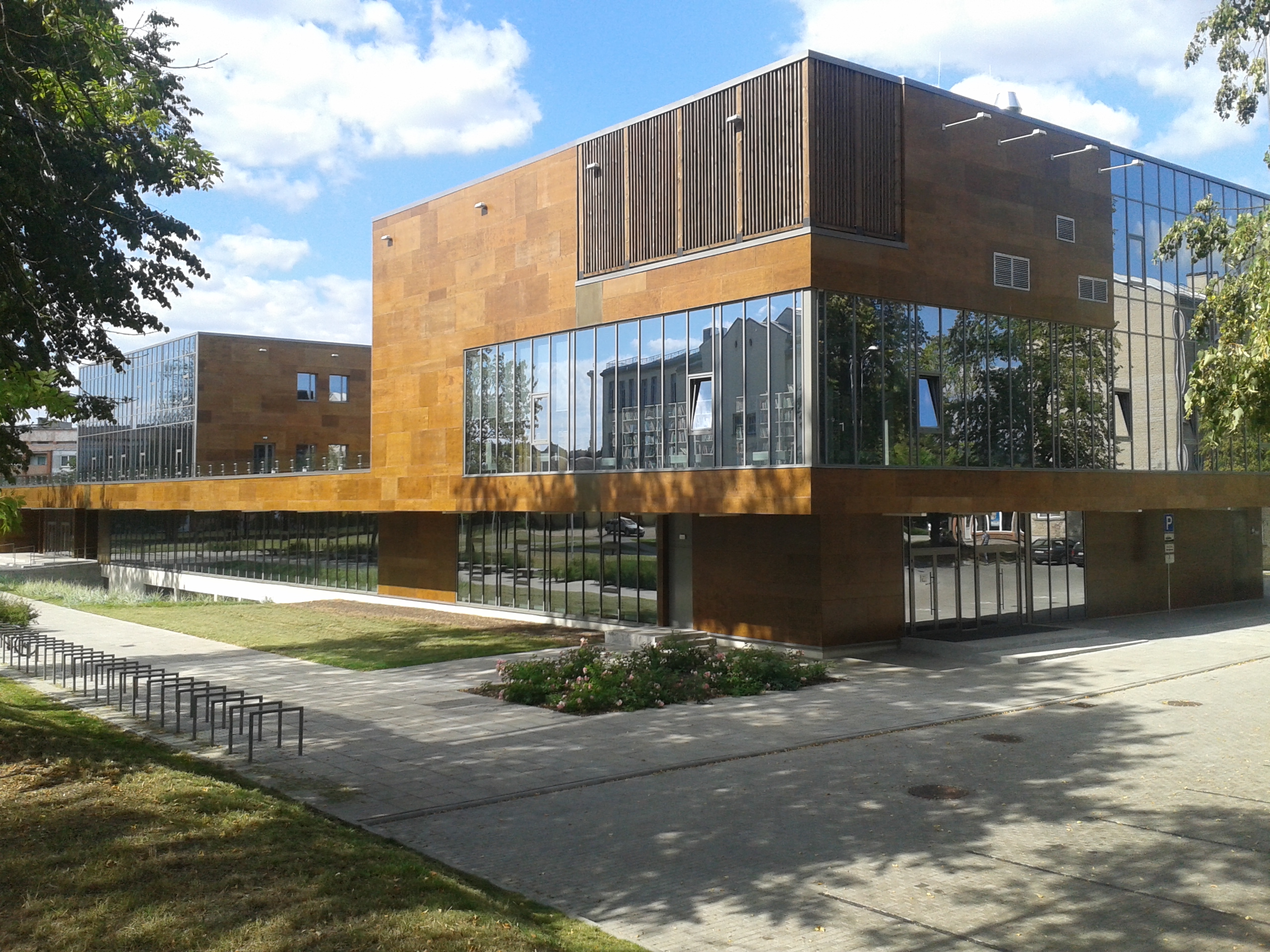
Faculty of Engineering

The Academy consists of three faculties:

- Faculty of Education, Languages, and Design
- Faculty of Engineering
- Faculty of Economics and Management
