= Silvija Šimfa =

Latvian politician (born 1954)

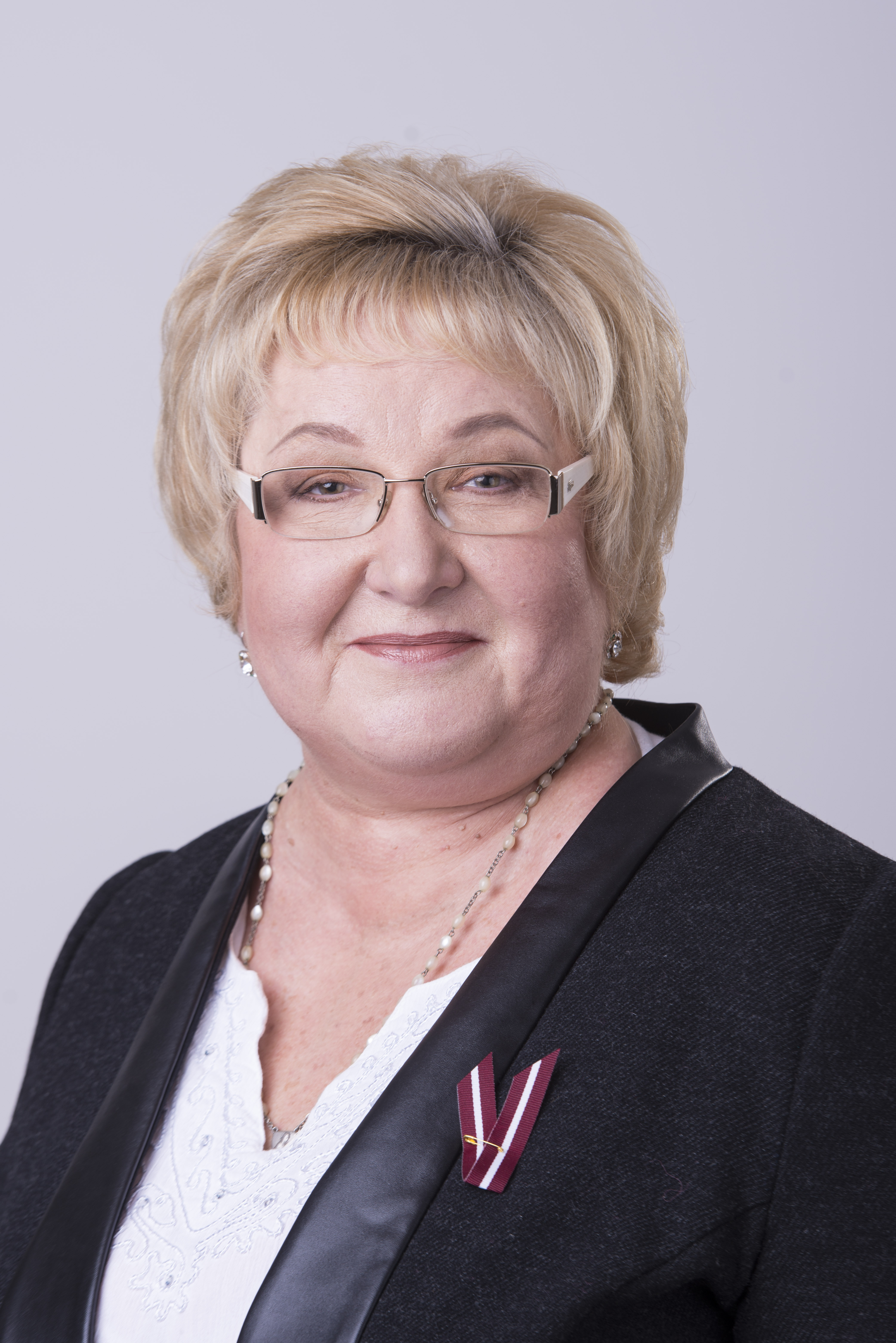
Silvija Šimfa in 2014

Silvija Šimfa (born 1954) is a Latvian politician, elected to the twelfth Saeima.
