= Anatolijs Mackevičs =

Latvian politician

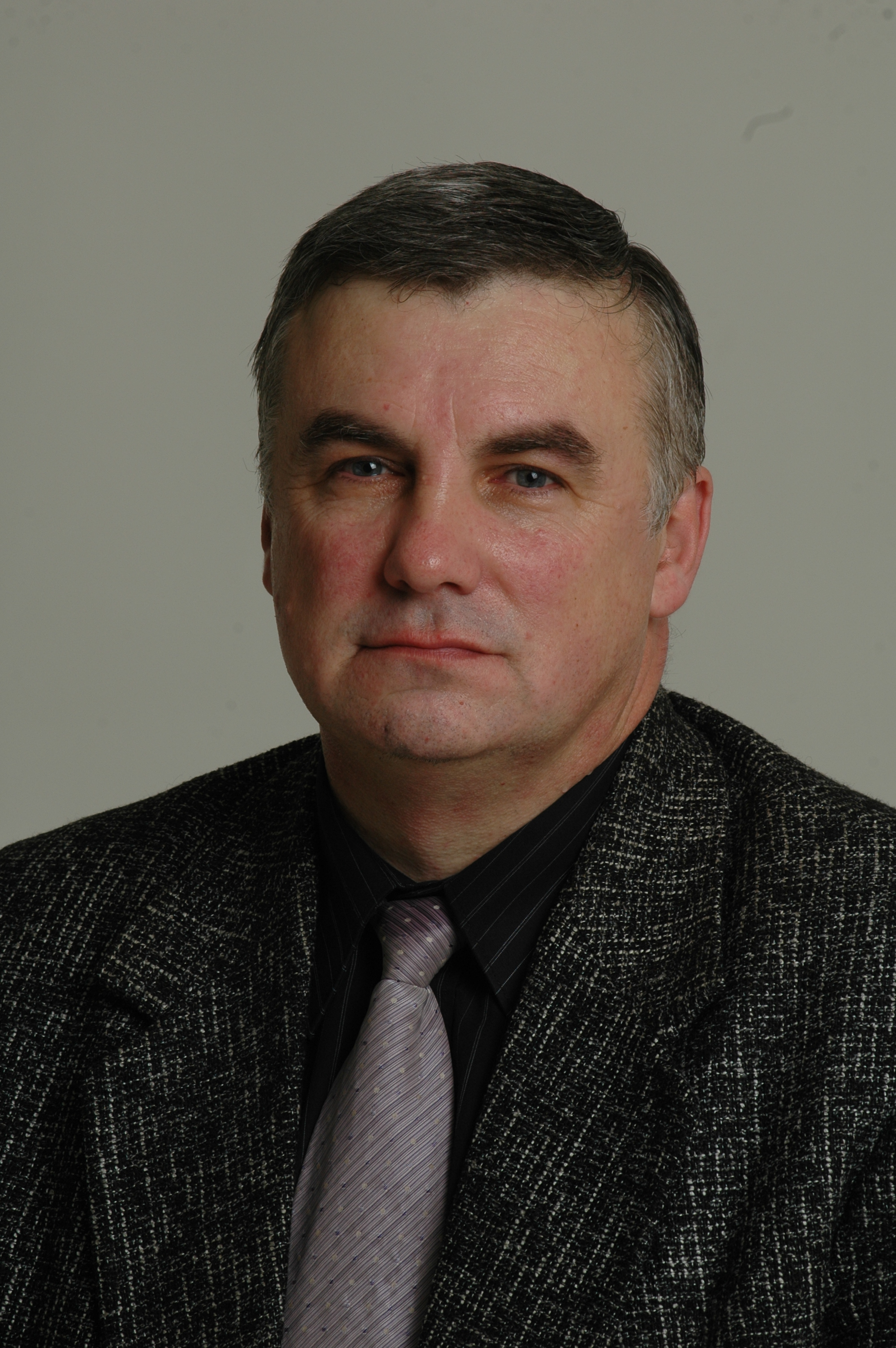
Anatolijs Mackevičs

Anatolijs Mackevičs (born 18 January 1956) is a Latvian politician. He is a member of the LPP/LC and a deputy of the 9th Saeima (Latvian Parliament). He began his current term in parliament on November 7, 2006. In February 2004, Mackevičs was expelled from the opposition People's Harmony Party (TSP) because he joined the Latvian First Party (LPP) faction in the coalition. At the time, Vice-Chairman of the TSP Group, Andrei Klementev, called this treason. Along with Mackevičs, four more MPs of the Parliament passed the LPP, who got the sign “the five-man of the transgressor”. The assumption that LPP paid such a decision to the "rogue" was denied by the deputies themselves. The MPs who passed the LPP did not deny that this decision was taken to go to the governing coalition of the Saeima, because, according to Mackevičs, "other members of the Saeima elected from among Russian-speaking voters" have no opportunity to be in the coalition, which gives the opportunity to "solve the issues".
