= Anta Rugāte =

Latvian politician

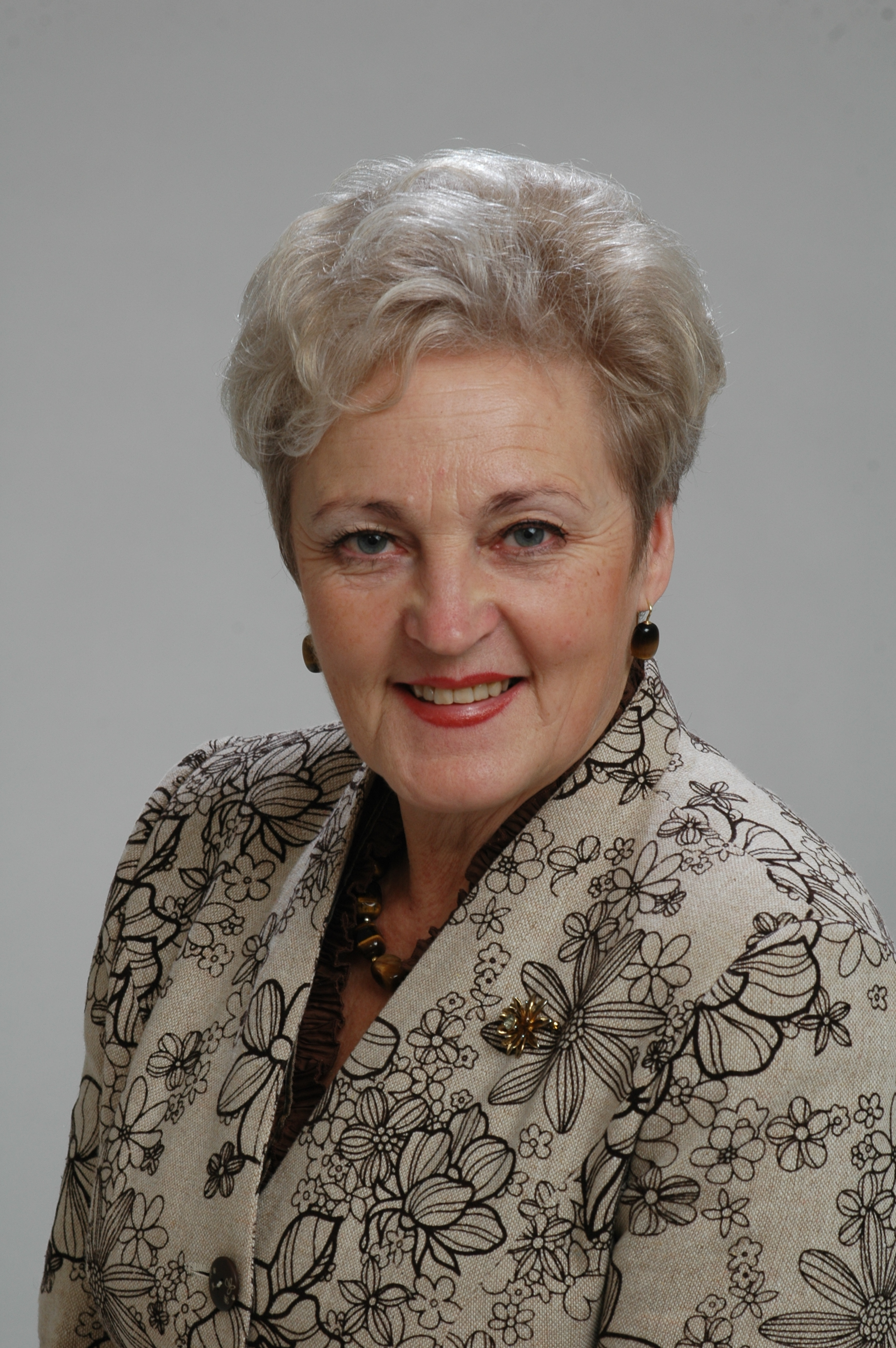
Anta Rugāte

Anta Rugāte (born Antonija Lūriņa; April 16, 1949 in Rundēni parish) is a Latvian journalist and politician. Rugāte served as a deputy of the Saeima.
