= Sarmīte Ķikuste =

Latvian physician and politician

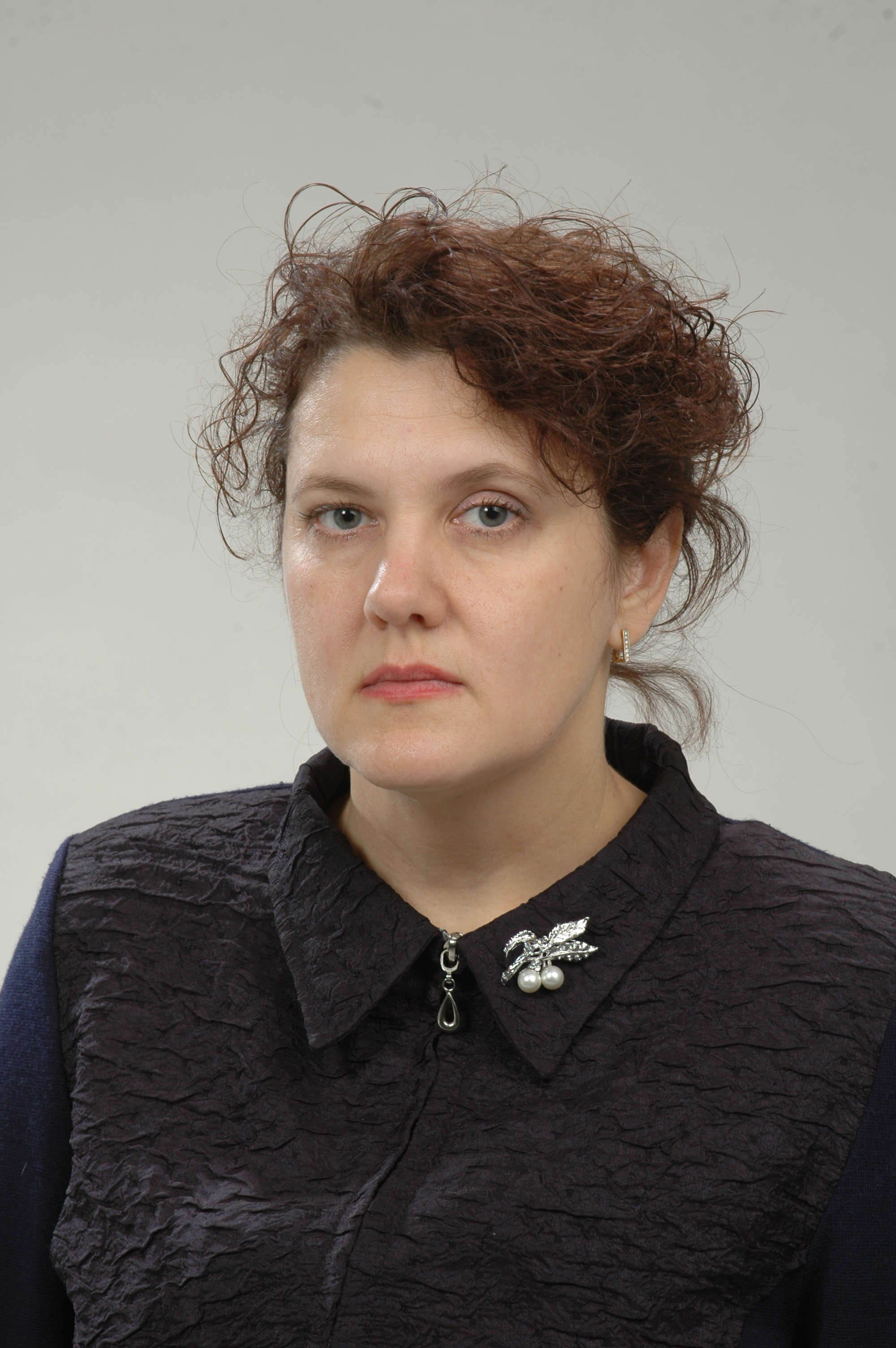
Sarmīte Ķikuste August 2004

Sarmīte Ķikuste (born 20 December 1962) is a Latvian physician and politician who served as a member of the eighth and ninth Saeimas.
