= Inese Laizāne =

Latvian actress and politician

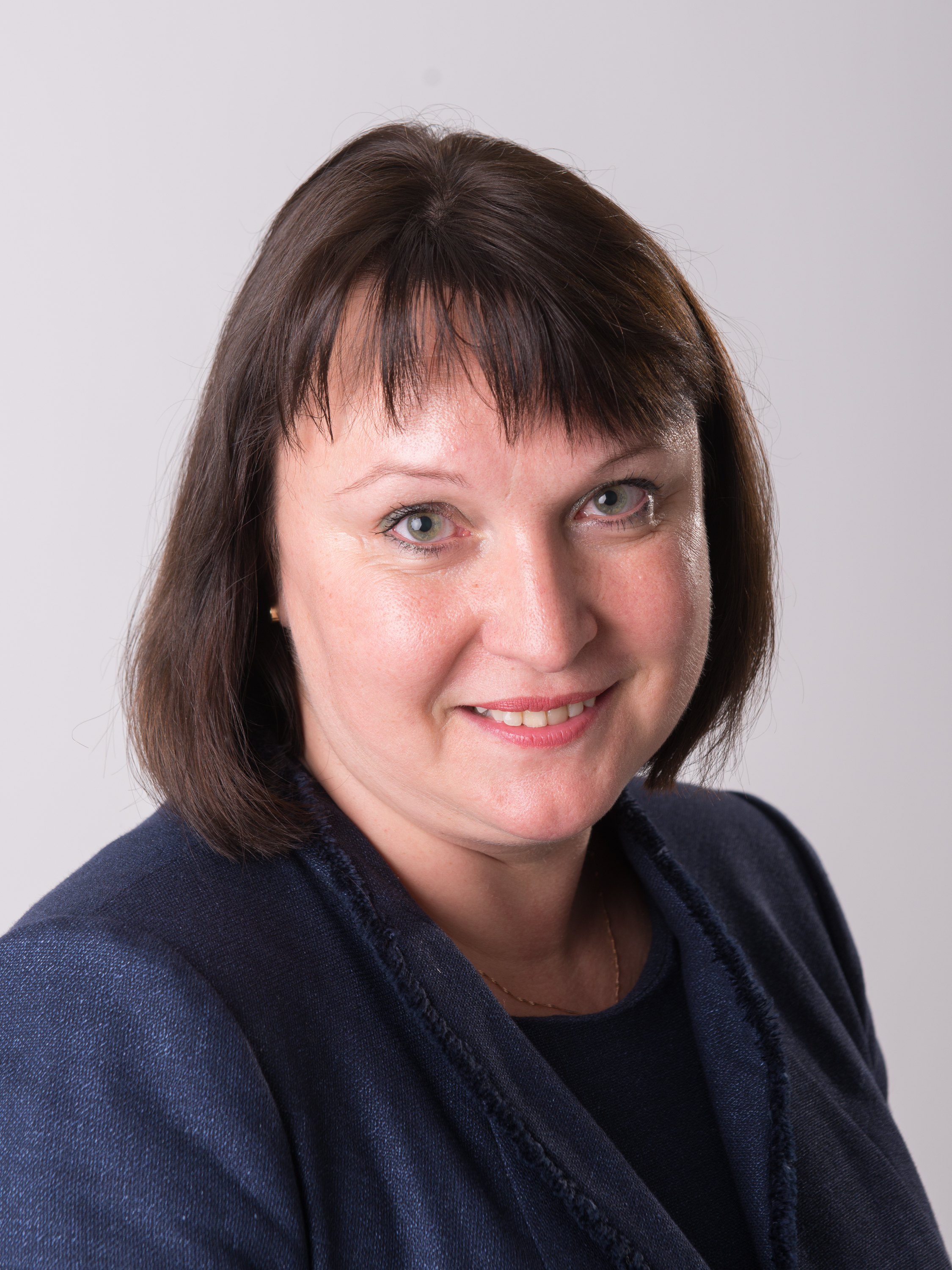

Deputy of the Saeima
- In office November 22, 2010 – November 6, 2018
- President: Raimonds Vējonis; Andris Bērziņš; Valdis Zatlers
- Prime Minister: Māris Kučinskis; Laimdota Straujuma; Valdis Dombrovskis

Personal details
- Born: 15 August 1971 Balvi, Latvian SSR, Soviet Union
- Died: 4 September 2024 (aged 53)
- Party: National Alliance (2011–2024)
- Other political affiliations: All for Latvia! (until 2011)
- Spouse: Harijs Petrockis
- Education: Latvian Academy of Music; Daugavpils University

Inese Laizāne (15 August 1971 in Balvi, to 4 September 2024) was a Latvian actress and politician.
