= Sergejs Fjodorovs =

Latvian politician

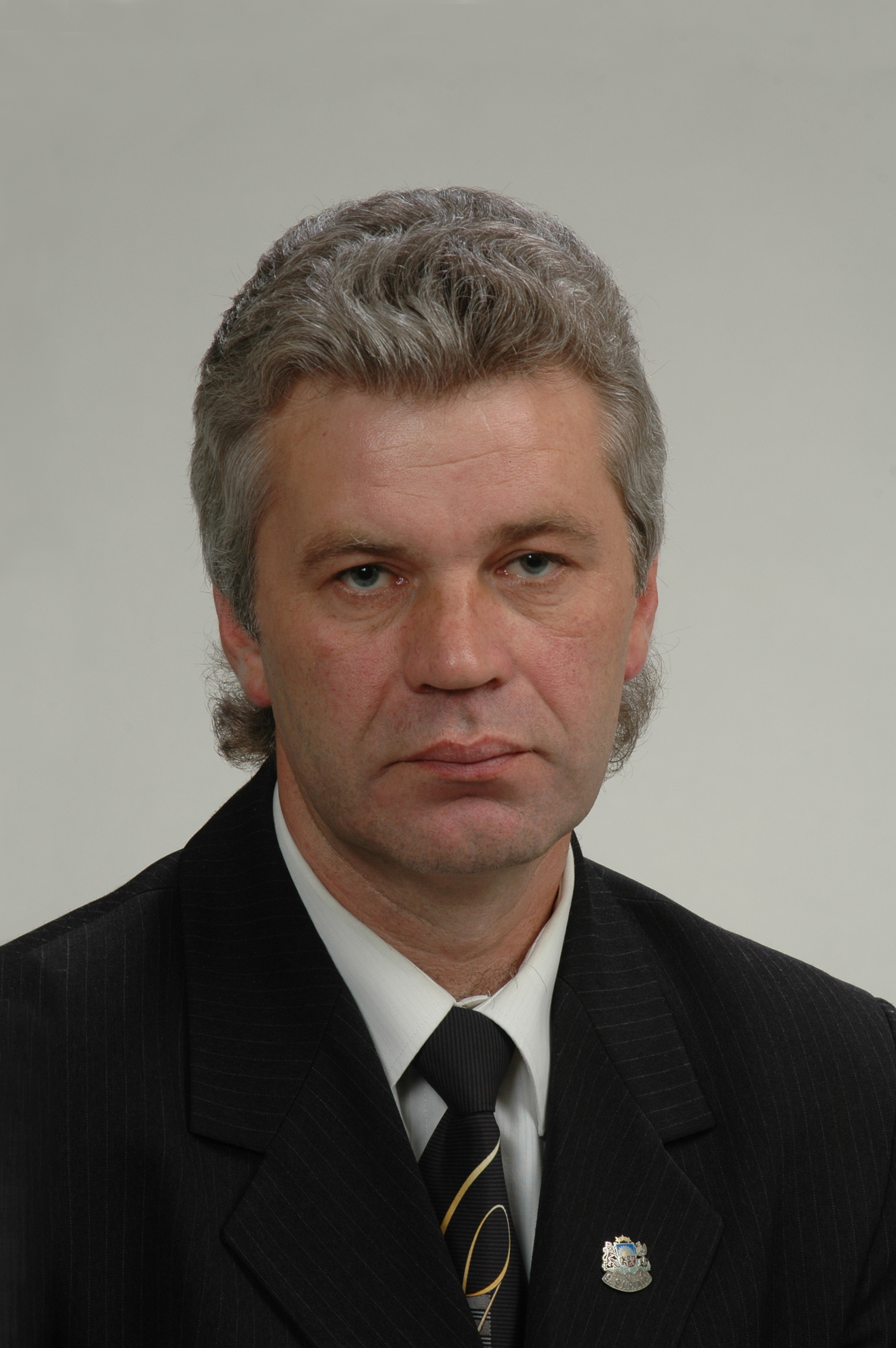
Sergejs Fjodorovs in 2004

Sergejs Fjodorovs (born 1956) is a Latvian politician. He is a member of the Socialist Party of Latvia and was a deputy of the 8th, 9th and 10th Saeima (Latvian Parliament).
