= Jānis Klaužs =

Latvian politician

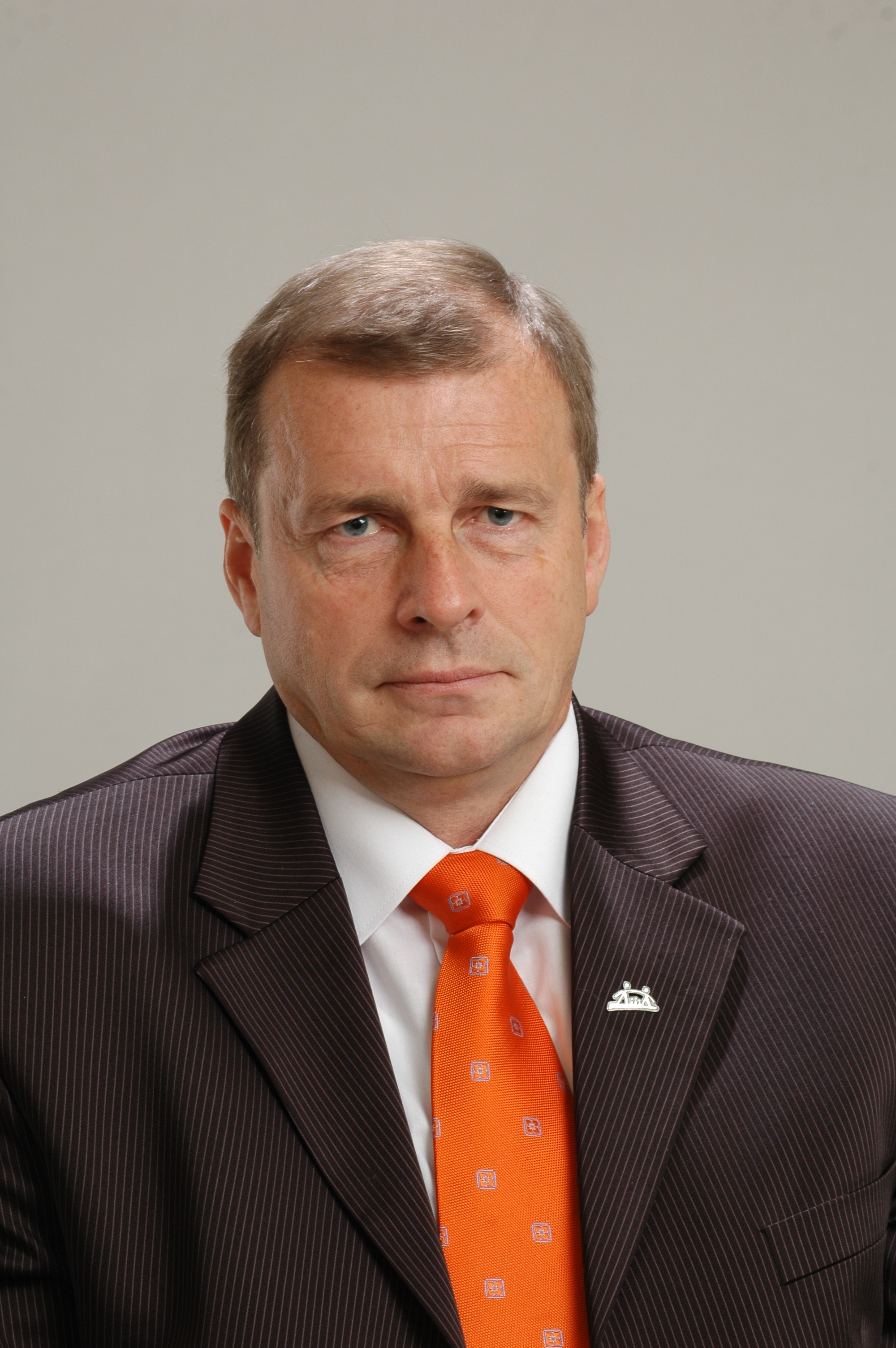

Member of the Saeima
- In office November 7, 2006 – November 6, 2018

Personal details
- Born: May 6, 1953 (age 73) Līvāni, Latvian SSR, Soviet Union
- Party: Union of Greens and Farmers (after 2010)
- Other political affiliations: People's Party (until 2010)

Jānis Klaužs (born 6 May 1953) is a Latvian politician. He is a Deputy of the Saeima and a member of the People's Party.
