= Aleksandrs Golubovs =

Latvian politician

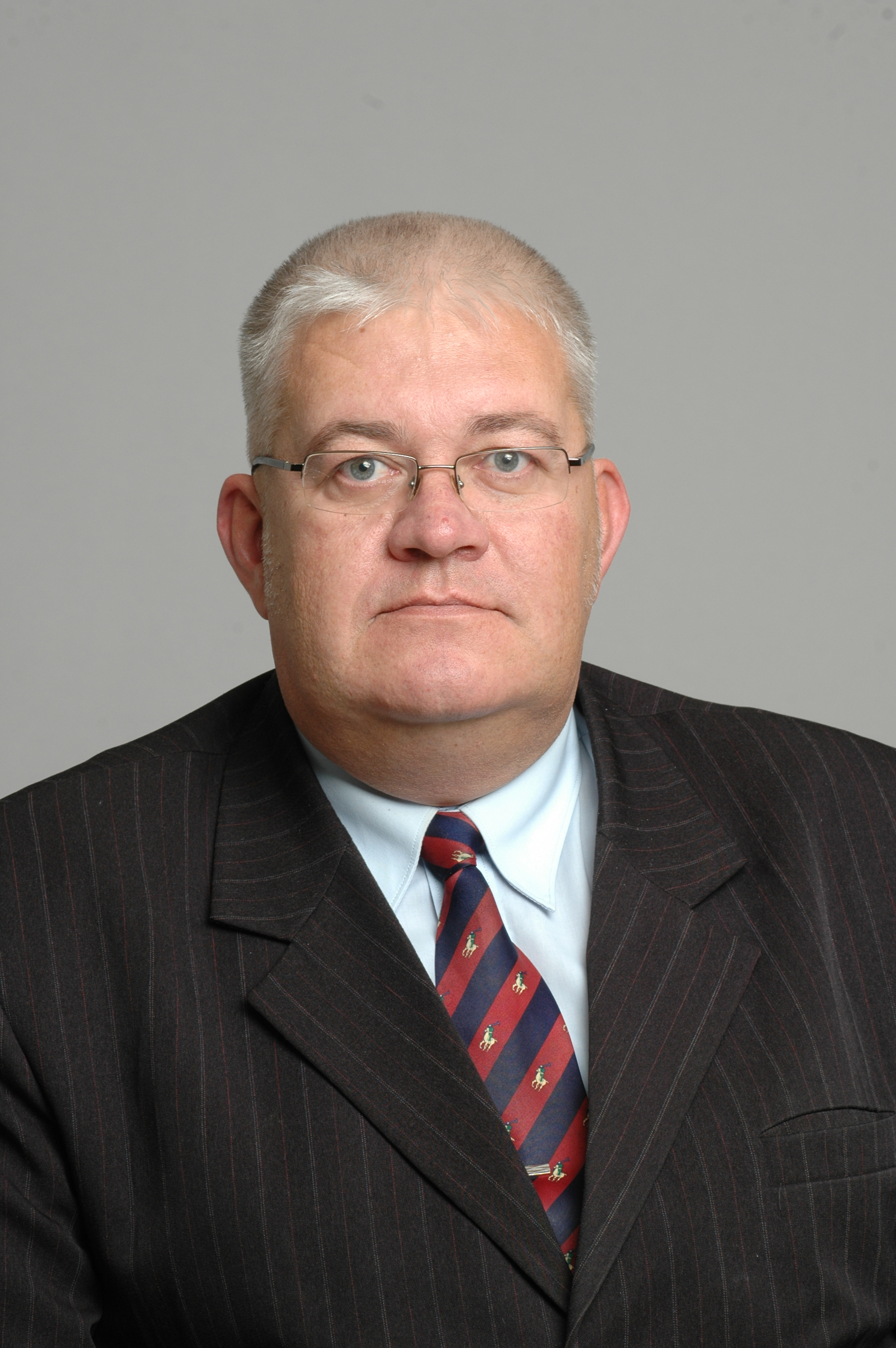
Aleksandrs Golubovs

Aleksandrs Golubovs (1959 – 19 May 2010) was a Latvian politician. He was a member of the Socialist Party of Latvia and a deputy of the 6th, 7th, 8th and 9th Saeima (Latvian Parliament). He began his last term in parliament on November 7, 2006. Golubovs died on 19 May 2010, during an official visit to Belarus.
