= Rēzekne district =

Coordinates: 56.509313°N 27.337589°E

Rēzekne
- District
- Coat of arms

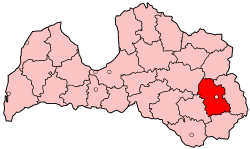
- Country: Latvia

Area
  - Total: 2,809 km^{2} (1,085 sq mi)

Population
  - Total: 41,662
  - Density: 14.83/km^{2} (38.41/sq mi)
- Website: rdc.lv/

Rēzekne district (Latvian: Rēzeknes rajons) was an administrative division of Latvia, located in Latgale region, in the country's east.

Districts were eliminated during the administrative-territorial reform in 2009.

== Cities ==
- Rēzekne
- Viļāni
