= Daugavpils district =

District of Latvia

Coordinates: 55°53′N 26°32′E

Daugavpils district Daugavpils rajons
- District
- Coat of arms

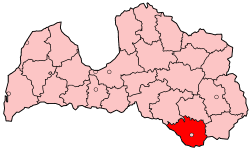
- Country: Latvia
- Seat: Daugavpils

Area
  - Total: 2,525.5 km^{2} (975.1 sq mi)

Population
  - Total: 39,851
  - Density: 15.779/km^{2} (40.869/sq mi)

Daugavpils district (Latvian: Daugavpils rajons) was an administrative division of Latvia, located in Latgale region, in the country's south-east. It was organized into two cities and twenty one parishes, each with a local government authority. The district council headquarters were located in the city of Daugavpils, which, however, was not part of the district. As of 2009, The district's area was 2,525.5 km^{2}, which contained 21 parishes, one city and one municipality.

The district was located in Latvia's southeastern area. It bordered Belarus, Lithuania, and the former Latvian districts of Jēkabpils, Preiļi and Krāslava.

Daugavpils district was situated in the geographical region of East-Latvian Lowland, Latgale Upland and Augšzeme Upland. The highest points above sea level were Egļukalns (220.1 m), Piķeļnieku kalns (206 m), Lediņu kalns (202 m) and Skrudalienas kalns (201 m). Almost all of the territory was located in the Daugava River basin. Besides the Daugava River there were many large and small rivers.

Districts were eliminated during the administrative-territorial reform in 2009, with Daugavpils district being divided into the municipalities of Daugavpils and Ilūkste.
