= 2006 Latvian parliamentary election =

Parliamentary election held in Latvia

- 7 October 2006
- All 100 seats in the Saeima; 51 seats needed for a majority
- Turnout: 60.98% (▼16.05pp)
Party	Leader	Vote %	Seats	+/–
TP	Andris Šķēle	19.68	23	+3
ZZS	Aivars Lembergs	16.81	18	+6
JL	Einars Repše	16.48	18	−8
SC	Jānis Urbanovičs	14.52	17	New
LPP/LC	Ainārs Šlesers	8.64	10	0
TB/LNNK	Roberts Zīle	6.99	8	+1
ForHRUL	Yakov Pliner	6.06	6	−19
This lists parties that won seats. See the complete results below.
Results by district
Prime Minister before	Prime Minister after
Aigars Kalvītis; People's Party	Aigars Kalvītis; People's Party

Parliamentary elections were held in Latvia on 7 October 2006. The governing coalition, led by Prime Minister Aigars Kalvītis and his People's Party, won the election. Kalvitis's government thus became the first to be re-elected since Latvia had regained independence in 1991.

== Conduct ==
The OSCE/ODIHR Limited Election Observation Mission found that "despite the ongoing naturalization process, the fact that a significant percentage of the adult population of Latvia does not enjoy voting rights represents a continuing democratic deficit". Its recommendations included:

- allowing independent candidates to stand in elections;
- giving consideration to granting “non-citizens” of Latvia the right to vote in municipal elections;
- allowing instructional materials, voter information and other relevant documents to be produced in both Latvian and Russian;
- clarifying applicability of the Party Financing Law to third-party activities in support of an electoral campaign or during the campaign period;
- considering terminating candidacy restrictions based on lustration provisions prior to the next Saeima elections.

MP Juris Boldāns, the former head of the administration of Kubuli Parish elected from TB/LNNK, was sentenced by the Latgale Regional Court to 8 months imprisonment for election fraud in October 2007, along with four members of the local election committee and his son. He also resigned from the party, but said he was not guilty. After an appeal from Boldāns, the sentence was reduced to 6 months, but the ban on participating in national and local elections for 2 years was upheld. After serving his sentence, he was released in April 2008, after which his mandate was shortly restored, although he has submitted a cassation appeal to the Supreme Court. Boldāns ultimately lost his seat in October 2008, when the Senate of the Supreme Court declared him guilty and sentenced him to an additional two months' imprisonment.

A member of "Harmony Centre", Jurijs Klementjevs and three employees of his enterprise were fined for buying votes by Zemgale Regional Court.

The Corruption Prevention and Combating Bureau (KNAB) found that The People's Party, LPP/LC, Harmony Centre, New Era and UGF had exceeded spending limits.

== Results ==
Party	Votes	%	Seats	+/–
People's Party	177,481	19.68	23	+3
Union of Greens and Farmers	151,595	16.81	18	+6
New Era Party	148,602	16.48	18	–8
Harmony Centre	130,887	14.52	17	New
Latvia's First Party/Latvian Way	77,869	8.64	10	0
For Fatherland and Freedom/LNNK	62,989	6.99	8	+1
For Human Rights in United Latvia	54,684	6.06	6	–19
Latvian Social Democratic Workers' Party	31,728	3.52	0	0
Motherland	18,860	2.09	0	New
All for Latvia!	13,469	1.49	0	New
New Democrats	11,505	1.28	0	New
Pensioners and Seniors Party	7,175	0.80	0	New
Māra's Land	4,400	0.49	0	0
Eurosceptics	3,365	0.37	0	New
Our Land	2,065	0.23	0	New
Social Justice Party	1,575	0.17	0	New
National Power Union	1,172	0.13	0	New
"Latvian's Latvia" National Political Defence Organisation	1,130	0.13	0	New
Fatherland Union	1,114	0.12	0	New
Total	901,665	100.00	100	0
Valid votes	901,665	99.20		
Invalid/blank votes	7,311	0.80		
Total votes	908,976	100.00		
Registered voters/turnout	1,490,636	60.98		
Source: Nohlen & Stöver

=== List of elected Deputies ===
Name	Alliance/party	Party	Constituency	Birth year	Votes
Aigars Kalvītis	TP	TP	Vidzeme	1966	73,687
Aigars Štokenbergs	TP	TP	Vidzeme	1963	16,346
Aija Barča	TP	LP	Kurzeme	1949	2,336
Ainars Baštiks	LPP/LC	LPP	Rīga	1958	21,929
Ainars Latkovskis	JL	JL	Vidzeme	1967	6,512
Ainārs Šlesers	LPP/LC	LPP	Rīga	1970	34,424
Aleksandrs Golubovs	SC	LSP	Latgale	1959	3,999
Aleksandrs Mirskis	SC	TSP	Rīga	1964	25,002
Aleksejs Vidavskis	SC	DPP	Latgale	1943	10,993
Anatolijs Mackevičs	LPP/LC	LPP	Latgale	1956	2,436
Andrejs Klementjevs	SC	TSP	Rīga	1973	11,075
Andris Bērziņš	LPP/LC	LC	Vidzeme	1951	10,748
Andris Bērziņš	ZZS	LZS	Zemgale	1955	9,602
Anna Seile	TB/LNNK	TB/LNNK	Vidzeme	1939	7,881
Anta Rugāte	TP	TP	Latgale	1949	6,849
Artis Kampars	JL	JL	Zemgale	1967	4,479
Artis Pabriks	TP	TP	Vidzeme	1966	30,908
Arturs Krišjānis Kariņš	JL	JL	Vidzeme	1964	25,721
Artūrs Rubiks	SC	LSP	Rīga	1970	17,344
Atis Slakteris	TP	TP	Zemgale	1956	17,703
Augusts Brigmanis	ZZS	LZS	Kurzeme	1952	12,896
Ausma Ziedone-Kantāne	JL	JL	Vidzeme	1941	7,129
Baiba Rivža	ZZS	LZS	Zemgale	1949	8,736
Boriss Cilevičs	SC	TSP	Rīga	1956	15,920
Dagnija Staķe	ZZS	LZS	Zemgale	1951	10,750
Dzintars Ābiķis	TP	TP	Zemgale	1952	8,623
Dzintars Rasnačs	TB/LNNK	TB/LNNK	Rīga	1963	8,296
Dzintars Zaķis	JL	JL	Zemgale	1970	1,804
Einars Repše	JL	JL	Vidzeme	1961	44,181
Gunārs Laicāns	TB/LNNK	TB/LNNK	Kurzeme	1949	1,031
Gunārs Upenieks	ZZS	LZS	Latgale	1964	1,493
Gundars Bērziņš	TP	TP	Vidzeme	1959	24,648
Gundars Daudze	ZZS	LuV	Kurzeme	1965	2,284
Guntis Blumbergs	ZZS	LuV	Kurzeme	1963	2,798
Helēna Demakova	TP	TP	Vidzeme	1959	28,356
Ilma Čepāne	JL	JL	Rīga	1947	22,048
Imants Kalniņš	TB/LNNK	TB/LNNK	Vidzeme	1941	6,995
Imants Valers	TP	TP	Zemgale	1961	919
Ina Druviete	JL	JL	Vidzeme	1958	27,882
Indulis Emsis	ZZS	LZP	Vidzeme	1952	19,617
Inese Šlesere	LPP/LC	LPP	Rīga	1972	9,004
Ingmārs Līdaka	ZZS	LZP	Vidzeme	1966	18,321
Ingrīda Circene	JL	JL	Kurzeme	1956	3,897
Inguna Rībena	JL	JL	Rīga	1956	8,563
Ivans Klementjevs	SC	TSP	Vidzeme	1960	6,275
Ivans Ribakovs	SC	TSP	Latgale	1960	7,571
Ivars Godmanis	LPP/LC	LC	Vidzeme	1951	11,758
Jakovs Pliners	PCTVL	BITE	Rīga	1946	16,153
Jānis Dukšinskis	LPP/LC	LC	Latgale	1963	3,186
Jānis Eglītis	TP	TP	Latgale	1961	1,982
Jānis Klaužs	TP	TP	Latgale	1953	1,952
Jānis Lagzdiņš	TP	TP	Kurzeme	1952	10,997
Jānis Reirs	JL	JL	Zemgale	1961	1,351
Jānis Strazdiņš	ZZS	LZS	Rīga	1941	3,866
Jānis Tutins	SC	TSP	Latgale	1966	5,954
Jānis Urbanovičs	SC	TSP	Rīga	1959	23,321
Juris Boldāns	TB/LNNK	TB/LNNK	Latgale	1951	1,544
Juris Dalbiņš	TP	TP	Rīga	1954	10,070
Juris Dobelis	TB/LNNK	TB/LNNK	Rīga	1940	12,672
Juris Sokolovskis	PCTVL	LĪDZTIESĪBA	Vidzeme	1976	7,141
Karina Pētersone	LPP/LC	LC	Zemgale	1954	8,469
Kārlis Šadurskis	JL	JL	Rīga	1959	11,361
Leons Līdums	TP	TP	Zemgale	1957	1,192
Leopolds Ozoliņš	ZZS	LZP	Rīga	1937	3,925
Linda Mūrniece	JL	JL	Rīga	1970	15,994
Mareks Segliņš	TP	TP	Rīga	1970	14,911
Māris Ārbergs	TP	TP	Kurzeme	1962	1,784
Māris Grīnblats	TB/LNNK	TB/LNNK	Rīga	1955	12,536
Māris Kučinskis	TP	TP	Vidzeme	1961	9,463
Mārtiņš Roze	ZZS	LZS	Vidzeme	1964	22,517
Miroslavs Mitrofanovs	PCTVL	LĪDZTIESĪBA	Latgale	1966	6,462
Nikolajs Kabanovs	PCTVL	BITE	Rīga	1970	9,567
Nils Ušakovs	SC	TSP	Rīga	1976	25,165
Oļegs Deņisovs	SC	LSP	Vidzeme	1966	1,444
Oskars Kastēns	LPP/LC	LPP	Kurzeme	1971	2,301
Oskars Spurdziņš	TP	TP	Rīga	1963	8,567
Pauls Putniņš	ZZS	LZS	Rīga	1937	1,203
Pēteris Hanka	ZZS	LZS	Kurzeme	1948	2,357
Pēteris Tabūns	TB/LNNK	TB/LNNK	Zemgale	1937	5,399
Raimonds Pauls	TP	TP	Vidzeme	1936	28,033
Raimonds Vējonis	ZZS	LZP	Vidzeme	1966	8,346
Sandra Kalniete	JL	JL	Vidzeme	1952	67,806
Sarmīte Ķikuste	JL	JL	Latgale	1962	1,102
Sergejs Dolgopolovs	SC	JC	Rīga	1941	20,682
Sergejs Fjodorovs	SC	LSP	Latgale	1956	3,271
Sergejs Mirskis	SC	TSP	Rīga	1952	5,740
Silva Bendrāte	JL	JL	Kurzeme	1956	1,794
Solvita Āboltiņa	JL	JL	Rīga	1963	23,860
Staņislavs Šķesters	ZZS	LZS	Latgale	1958	3,124
Uldis Briedis	TP	TP	Kurzeme	1942	1,698
Uldis-Ivars Grava	JL	JL	Kurzeme	1938	1,441
Valērijs Agešins	SC	TSP	Kurzeme	1972	5,279
Valērijs Buhvalovs	PCTVL	BITE	Zemgale	1957	895
Vents Armands Krauklis	TP	TP	Vidzeme	1964	5,735
Viktors Ščerbatihs	ZZS	LZS	Zemgale	1974	4,978
Vineta Muižniece	TP	TP	Rīga	1956	7,802
Visvaldis Lācis	ZZS	LZP	Vidzeme	1924	5,866
Vitālijs Aizbalts	LPP/LC	MSN	Latgale	1959	3,119
Vitālijs Orlovs	SC	TSP	Zemgale	1964	6,623
Vladimirs Buzajevs	PCTVL	LĪDZTIESĪBA	Rīga	1951	7,443
Source: Overall results - Centrālā vēlēšanu komisija - CVK

== Aftermath ==
The governing coalition of the People's Party, the Union of Greens and Farmers, the New Era Party and Latvia's First Party/Latvian Way received strong support from the voters, with 69 of the 100 MPs. Although this coalition could have continued, a new governing coalition was formed by the People's Party, the Union of Greens and Farmers, Latvia's First Party/Latvian Way and For Fatherland and Freedom, ejecting the New Era Party from government.
