= List of political parties in Latvia =

List of major and minor parties in latvia

This is a list of political parties in Latvia. Latvia has a multi-party system, where often no one party has a chance of gaining power alone, and parties must work with each other to form coalition governments.

== Major parties ==
The following are parties represented in the Saeima or the European Parliament.

| Party | Abbr. | Leader(s) | Ideology | Political position | MPs | MEPs | Notes |
|---|---|---|---|---|---|---|---|
| New Unity; Jaunā Vienotība | JV | Evika Siliņa | Liberalism; Liberal conservatism; Civic nationalism | Centre-right | 7 / 100 | 2 / 9 | Members: V, LP, VuV |
| Union of Greens and Farmers; Zaļo un Zemnieku savienība | ZZS | Armands Krauze | Agrarianism; Green conservatism; Economic nationalism | Centre | 0 / 100 | 0 / 9 | Members: LZS, LuV, LSDSP |
| United List; Apvienotais saraksts | AS | Edgars Tavars; Edvards Smiltēns | Regionalism; Green conservatism | Centre to centre-right | 41 / 100 | 1 / 9 | Members: LZP, LRA, LP |
| National Alliance; Nacionālā apvienība | NA | Ilze Indriksone | National conservatism; Economic liberalism | Right-wing | 10 / 100 | 2 / 9 | —N/a |
| For Stability! Stabilitātei! | S! | Jefimijs Klementjevs | Populism; Russian minority politics; Euroscepticism | Centre | 0 / 100 | 0 / 9 | —N/a |
| The Progressives; Progresīvie | PRO | Kaspars Briškens | Progressivism; Social democracy | Left-wing | 10 / 100 | 1 / 9 | —N/a |
| Latvia First; Latvija pirmajā vietā | LPV | Ainārs Šlesers | National conservatism; Right-wing populism | Far-right | 17 / 100 | 1 / 9 | —N/a |
| For Latvia's Development; Latvijas attīstībai | LA | Artis Pabriks; Juris Pūce; Ivars Ijabs | Classical liberalism; Market liberalism | Centre-right | 0 / 100 | 1 / 9 | —N/a |
| People. Land. Statehood. Tauta. Zeme. Valstiskums. | TZV | Aleksandrs Kiršteins | National conservatism; Fiscal conservatism | Centre-right to right-wing | 1 / 100 | 0 / 9 | —N/a |
| Honor to serve Riga! Gods kalpot Rīgai! | GKR | Oļegs Burovs | Regionalism | Centre-right | 1 / 100 | 0 / 9 | —N/a |

== Minor and regional parties ==
- We Change the Rules (Mēs mainām noteikumus, MMN)
- Latvian Russian Union (Latvijas Krievu savienība, LKS)
- Alliance of Young Latvians (Apvienība Jaunlatvieši, AJ)
- United for Latvia (Vienoti Latvijai, VL)
- New Conservative Party (Jaunā konservatīvā partija, JKP)
- Christian Democratic Union (Kristīgi Demokrātiskā Savienība, KDS)
- Centre Party (Centra partija)
- Platform 21 (Platforma 21, P21)
- For Latvia and Ventspils (Latvijai un Ventspilij, LuV) – nationally allied with the Union of Greens and Farmers
- Force of People's Power (Tautas Varas Spēks, TVS)
- Growth (Izaugsme) – part of Development/For!
- Heritage of the Fatherland (Tēvzemes mantojums, TM)
- Honor to serve Riga (Gods kalpot Rīgai, GKR)
- National Union "Justice" (Nacionālā Savienība Taisnīgums, NST)
- Latgale Party (Latgales partija) – in Latgale; allied with Unity within the New Unity alliance
- People's Servants for Latvia (Tautas kalpi Latvijai, TKL)
- Christian Party (Kristīgā partija, KP)
- Latvian Social Democratic Workers' Party (Latvijas Sociāldemokrātiskā Strādnieku Partija, LSDSP), part of Union of Greens and Farmers
- Socialist Party of Latvia (Latvijas Sociālistiskā partija, LSP)
- Sovereign Power (Suverēnā vara, SV)
- Rising Sun for Latvia (Austošā Saule Latvijai, ASL)

== Defunct parties and alliances ==
- Action Party (Rīcības partija)
- Awakening for Latvia (Atmoda Latvijai, formerly For Latvia from the Heart, NSL)
- Popular Front of Latvia (Latvijas Tautas Fronte, LTF)
- Reform Party (Reformu partija, RP) (2011-2015)
- People's Party (Tautas Partija, TP)
- New Era Party (Jaunais Laiks, JL)
- All For Latvia! (Visu Latvijai!, VL) (2006-2011)
- Civic Union (Pilsoniskā Savienība, PS)
- Communist Party of Latvia (Latvijas Komunistiskā Partija, LKP) – banned in 1991
- Democratic Center Party (Demokrātiskā Centra Partija, DCP)
- Daugavpils City Party (Daugavpils Pilsētas Partija, DPP)
- Democratic Party "Saimnieks" (Demokrātiskā Partija "Saimnieks", DPS)
- Equal Rights (Līdztiesība, ER)
- For Fatherland and Freedom/LNNK (Tēvzemei un Brīvībai/LNNK, TB/LNNK)
- For a Humane Latvia (Par cilvēcīgu Latviju, PCL)
- For the Native Language! (Par Dzimto Valodu!)
- Free Choice in a People's Europe (Brīvā izvēle tautu Eiropā, BITE)
- Workers' Party (Darba Partija, DP)
- Honor to Serve Our Latvia (Gods kalpot mūsu Latvijai, GKML)
- Latvian Social Democratic Party (Latvijas Sociāldemokrātiskā Partija, LSDP)
- Latvian National Independence Movement (Latvijas Nacionālās Neatkarības Kustība, LNNK)
- Latvian Nationalists (Latviešu Nacionālisti)
- Latvia's First Party (Latvijas Pirmā Partija, LPP)
- Latvian Way (Latvijas Ceļš, LC)
- National Harmony Party (Tautas Saskaņas Partija, TSP)
- New Centre (Jaunais Centrs, JC)
- New Party (Jaunā Partija, JP)
- Our Land (Mūsu Zeme)
- People of Latgale (Latgales Tauta, LT)
- Popular Movement for Latvia (Tautas Kustība Latvijai, TKL)
- Social Democratic Party (Sociāldemokrātiskā partija, SDS)
- Social Democratic Party "Harmony" (Sociāldemokrātiskā partija Saskaņa)
- Socialist Workers and Peasants Party of Latvia (Latvijas Sociālistiskā Strādnieku un Zemnieku Partija)
- Society for Political Change (Sabiedrība Citai Politikai, SCP)
- Anti-Centrist Party
- Christian Peasant and Catholic Party (Latgales kristīgo zemnieku un katoļu partija, LKZKP)
- New Farmers-Small Landowners Party (Latvijas Jaunsaimnieku un sīkgruntnieku partija, LJSP)
- Agrarian Union of the Landless (Bezzemnieku agrārā savienība, BAS)
- United Polish Parties (Apvienotās poļu partijas)
- Committee Of The German Baltic Parties (Ausschuß der Deutschbaltischen Parteien, ADP)
- Christian National Union (CNU)
- Latgalian Progressive Farmers (LPF)
- Polish Catholic Party (PC)
- Progressive Union (PA)

== See also ==
- Liberalism in Latvia
- Politics of Latvia
- List of political parties by country
