= Social Democratic Party (Latvia) =

Former Latvian political party

Social Democratic Party Sociāldemokrātiskā partija
- Logo of the Social Democratic Union
- Abbreviation: SDS (2002–2008); SDP (2008–2010)
- Leader: Egils Rutkovskis
- Founder: Egils Baldzēns
- Founded: 24 March 2002
- Dissolved: 10 February 2010
- Split from: Latvian Social Democratic Workers' Party
- Merged into: Social Democratic Party "Harmony"
- Headquarters: Riga, Basteja bulvārī 12 (2.stāvā), LV-1050.
- Youth wing: Jaunatnes Sociāldemokrātiskā Savienība
- Ideology: Social democracy
- Political position: Centre-left
- National affiliation: Harmony Centre (2009–2010)
- International affiliation: Socialist International
- Colours: Red

Website
- socialdemokrati.lv

The Social Democratic Party (Latvian: Sociāldemokrātiskā partija, SDP; formerly Social Democratic Union, Latvian: Sociāldemokrātu savienība, SDS) was a political party in Latvia formed by a splinter group from the Latvian Social Democratic Labour Party (LSDSP) after the leader of the LSDSP faction in the Saeima, Egils Baldzēns, lost to Juris Bojārs in the elections for party chairman on 27 October 2001. The major factor in the schism was the increasing intimacy between the LSDSP and the For Human Rights in United Latvia Bloc, considered to be excessively pro-Russian by the more nationalist members in Baldzēns' breakaway wing of the party. The newly formed SDS held its founding congress in Riga on 24 March 2002. In the 2002 election, the party won 1.5% of the popular vote and no seats. The last leader of the party was Egils Rutkovskis.

In January 2009, the party joined the Harmony Centre coalition. It merged into the Harmony party in 2010.

== Election results ==
=== Legislative elections ===
Election	Party leader	Performance					Rank	Government
Election	Party leader	Votes	%	± pp	Seats	+/–	Rank	Government
2002	Egils Baldzēns	15,162	1.53	New	0 / 100	New	10th	Extra-parliamentary
2006	Pēteris Salkazanovs	Did not contest						Extra-parliamentary
2010	Egils Rutkovskis	251,400	26.61	▲25.08	0 / 100	0	▲2nd	Extra-parliamentary (Note: Harmony Centre list won 29 seats - 24 went to SDPS - 4 went to SPL - 1 to DCP)

=== European Parliament elections ===
Election	Party leader	Performance					Rank
Election	Party leader	Votes	%	± pp	Seats	+/–	Rank
2004	Pēteris Salkazanovs	1,988	0.35	New	0 / 8	New	16th
2009	Alfrēds Rubiks	154,894	19.93	▲19.58	0 / 8	0	▲2nd (Note: Harmony Centre list won 2 seats - 1 went to TSP - 1 to LSP)
