= Nils Ušakovs =

Latvian politician and journalist

- Нил Валерьевич Ушаков
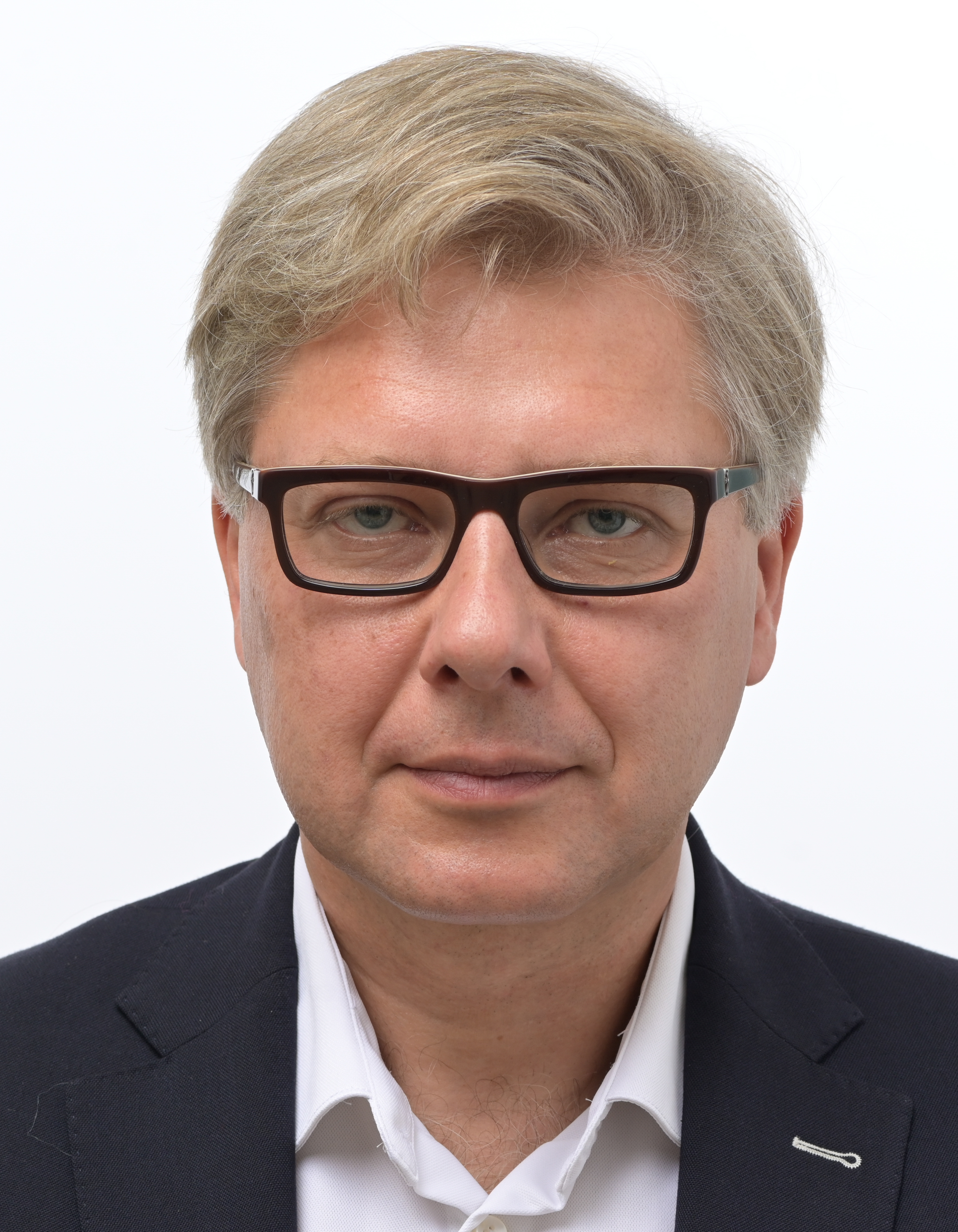

Member of the European Parliament for Latvia
- Incumbent
- Assumed office 2 July 2019

8th Mayor of Riga
- In office 1 July 2009 – 4 April 2019
- Deputy: Ainārs Šlesers (2006–2010); Andris Ameriks (2010–2018); Oļegs Burovs (2018–2019); Vadims Baraņņiks (2019)
- Preceded by: Jānis Birks
- Succeeded by: Dainis Turlais

Member of the Saeima
- In office 7 November 2006 – 1 July 2009

Personal details
- Born: 8 June 1976 (age 50) Riga, then part of Latvian SSR, Soviet Union
- Citizenship: USSR (1976–1991); Stateless (1991—1998); Latvia (since 1998)
- Party: Harmony (2010–present)
- Other political affiliations: National Harmony Party (2005–2010)
- Spouse(s): Marija Ušakova (divorced 2008) Jeļena Ušakova (m. 2010; div. 2014) Iveta Strautiņa-Ušakova (m. 2014)
- Children: 1
- Education: University of Latvia; University of Southern Denmark
- Occupation: Politician; journalist

Nils Ušakovs (Russian: Нил Валерьевич Ушаков, romanized: Nil Valeryevich Ushakov; born 8 June 1976) is a Latvian politician, former mayor of Riga and former journalist. He was the board chairman of the left-wing party alliance Harmony Centre (2005–2014) and afterwards board chairman of the Social Democratic Party "Harmony" (2014–2019). In 2009 Ušakovs was elected the Mayor of Riga, becoming the first ethnic Russian Riga Mayor since Latvia's restoration of sovereignty in 1991, a position he continuously held until his dismissal in 2019.

== Background ==
Ušakovs was born in Riga into the family of an engineer and an amateur jazz musician Valērijs Ušakovs and literature and Russian language teacher Ludmila Ušakova. During his childhood, Ušakovs considered a military career, perhaps influenced by his family's history: both of his grandparents were army officers who fought in World War II, and many of his ancestors were involved in the Russian Civil War. Ušakovs graduated from the University of Latvia in 1999 with a bachelor's degree in economics. He became a naturalized citizen of Latvia the same year. He then lived and studied in Denmark, where he received a candidatus oeconomices degree with specialization in European integration issues from the University of Southern Denmark in 2002. Aside from his native Russian, Ušakovs is fluent in English and Latvian, with basic knowledge of Swedish, Danish and German.

== Journalist ==
From 1998 to 2005, Ušakovs had occupied various positions within Russian and Latvian-language media, including NTV (1998–1999), Latvijas Televīzija (1999–2000), TV5 (2001–2004) and the Channel One Baltic (2004–2005), where he worked as a news editor. In 2004, Ušakovs, for his contribution to journalism, was conferred the Cicero Award, established by the University of Latvia and the Latvian Association of Journalists.

== Politician ==
=== Saeima member (2006–2009) ===
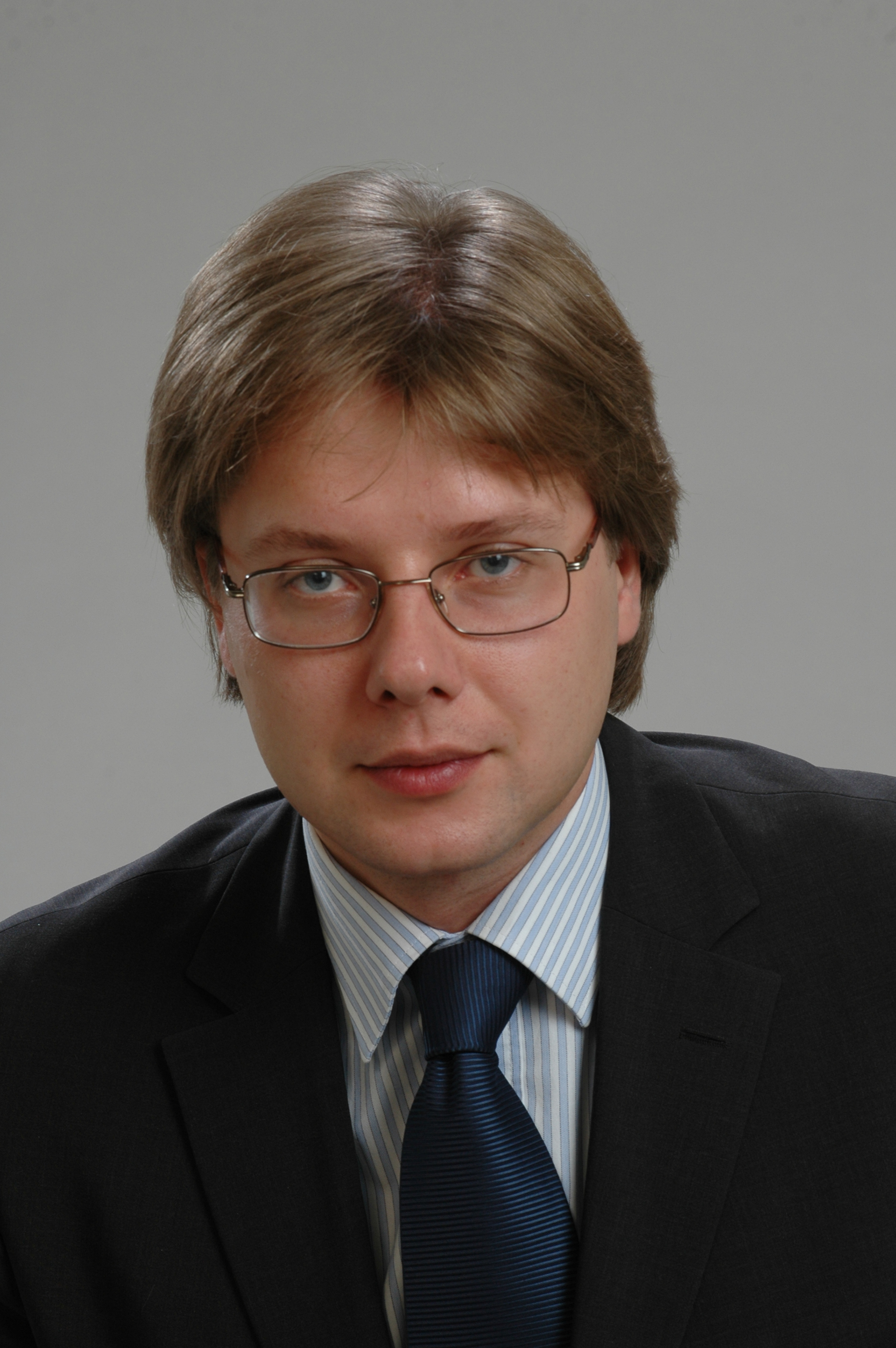
Ušakovs as a deputy of the 9th Saeima in 2004

In 2005, Ušakovs' friend Jānis Urbanovičs made an invitation to join the National Harmony Party, which Ušakovs accepted. The party soon entered the Harmony Centre alliance, with Ušakovs elected its leader. He became a Saeima member after the 2006 Latvian parliamentary election, his alliance winning 17 seats (the third-best result). The alliance positioned itself as the only political force in the country promoting cooperation between the ethnic Latvians and Russians. Ušakovs has argued that this is the only way to achieve fuller integration of the Russian-speaking population, as opposed to political parties catering to the interests of only one ethnicity.

=== Mayor of Riga ===
Ušakovs has held the post of Riga Mayor continuously from 2009 till 2019 and his represented Harmony Centre has received the most votes in the past three municipal elections in Riga (2009, 2013 and 2017).

==== First term (2009–2013) ====
The Harmony Centre was the winner of the 6 June 2009, local election in Riga, securing 26 out of 60 seats. It entered a coalition with Ainārs Šlesers' LPP/LC party, which won 12 seats. Ušakovs and Šlesers were nominated for the posts of mayor and deputy mayor respectively, a move approved by the new city council on 1 July.

Ušakovs' inauguration was marred by a small controversy: the previous mayor, Jānis Birks of the right-wing, national conservative For Fatherland and Freedom/LNNK party, which failed to win any seats, did not participate in the traditional ceremony of passing the chain of office to the new mayor. Birks' press secretary claimed that it was not due to an ideological conflict or a grudge, but because Birks was away from the city on that day.

Ušakovs saw strengthening of ties with Russia, particularly in the realms of freight transit through the Riga free port and tourism, as a solution to Riga's economic troubles, as Latvia was significantly affected by the 2008 financial crisis. During his campaign for the Riga's City Council, Ušakovs also argued for more emphasis on education of Latvia's population and protection of vital local industries. On 23 November 2010 Ušakovs was elected in the Freeport of Riga Board.

On 5 January 2010 members from the Riga City Council opposition initiated an unsuccessful vote of no confidence against Ušakovs, criticizing him of "undemocratic governance, work in the interest of private lobbies, poor management skills and squandering money".

According to data from research centre SKDS, Ušakovs' popularity among Rigans had grown steadily, from 53.1% of Rigans approving of Ušakovs' performance in August 2009 to 73% of the city's residents approving of him in December 2010, the highest recorded approval among Riga Mayors since March 1997, when the sociological studies were launched. In a 2010 survey by newspaper Neatkarīgā Ušakovs was voted the best Mayor of Riga by 43% respondents.

In 2011 Ušakovs signed a petition for Russian as a second official language in Latvia, despite the fact that both Harmony and Ušakovs had previously stated that they do not support it. He released a statement saying that he had been angered by National Alliance voting against the allocation of funds for such a referendum and went on to argue that it is not a move against the Latvian language, but in the name of dignity. After that other deputies, local government representatives and public officials from Harmony Centre began to sign it as well, including MP Nikolajs Kabanovs.

==== Second term (2013–2017) ====
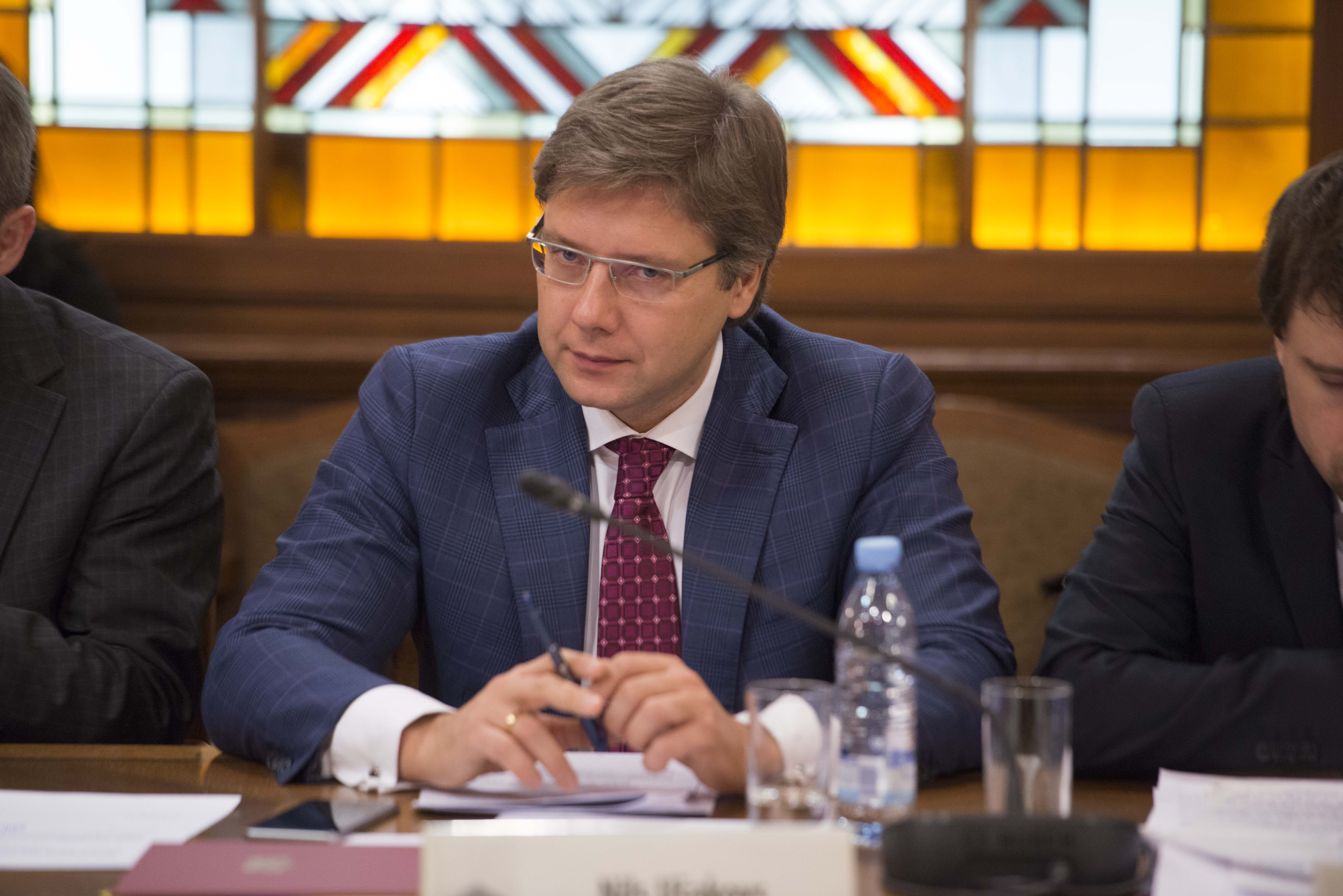
Ušakovs in a 26 January 2015 meeting of the Parliamentary investigative commission for the Zolitūde shopping centre roof collapse

After the Zolitūde shopping centre roof collapse in 2013 Ušakovs announced on November that he, unlike Prime Minister Valdis Dombrovskis, will not be resigning as he believed he could best serve the interests of his voters by remaining in office. Ušakovs called the resignation of Dombrovskis "a cynical attempt to kill two birds with one stone" and criticized him of avoiding solving current problems. In December 2013 Ušakovs was asked by the Ministry of Environmental Protection and Regional Development to provide explanations for "ineffective construction control in the capital".

On 3 December 2013, two demonstrations were organized in the Latvian Riflemen Square near the City Council to both express support and criticism of Ušakovs for not resigning in the Zolitūde shopping centre roof collapse aftermath. They were attended by several hundred people, many of the supporters being Rīgas Satiksme employees who were allowed to take a day off to participate in the demonstration. Asked for comment Ušakovs responded by asking to point a single person brought to the demonstration by force. An investigation was launched by the Corruption Prevention and Combating Bureau on the alleged misappropriation of taxpayers’ money and use of said money to finance the public demonstration in support of Ušakovs.

In August 2014 Ušakovs criticized the sanctions imposed against Russia for its aggression against Ukraine as a "nightmarish idea" and warned that Latvia would suffer the most from Russian counter sanctions, adding that he would "go and plead for them to keep our stands open so that, when this war is over, there’s a place to return to". A month later Ušakovs went on an official visit to Moscow, where he met with Russian Prime Minister and former President Dmitry Medvedev, head of the Russian Orthodox church Patriarch Kirill and Moscow Mayor Sergey Sobyanin to discuss current developments in economic relations, cultural promotion and other issues.

A few days later Ušakovs went on an official party visit to Washington DC, where he met with State Department officials to discuss political situation of the Russian-speaking minority and its integration, rights of national and ethnic language minorities, NATO financing and the response of U.S. to the Russo-Ukrainian War.

On 20 February 2015, during another visit in Moscow Ušakovs received the International Public Orthodox Peoples Unity Award for "strengthening Christian principles within society" from Patriarch Kirill, as well as 10,000 US dollars that Ušakovs donated towards the renovation of St. Nicholas Orthodox chapel in Spīķeri, Riga.

In 2015 the Parliamentary investigative commission issued a final report, declaring that Ušakovs was one of the 7 people politically and morally responsible for the Zolitūde shopping centre roof collapse, in Ušakovs’ case the reason being that "Riga City Council's construction supervision system was inefficient and fragmented, while the procedure of certification of construction experts did not contribute to the development of safe construction practices".

==== Third term (2017–2019) ====
In 2017 Ušakovs was elected for the third term as mayor of Riga.

In December 2018 Corruption Prevention and Combating Bureau carried out more than 30 searches in the offices of Rīgas Satiksme and the Rīga City Council and detained 8 people in Latvia and Poland in relation to a corruption probe over rigged multi-million tenders from 2013 to 2016, prompting the resignation of Rīgas Satiksme board and Riga City Council deputy mayor Andris Ameriks. The President of Latvia Raimonds Vējonis, Prime Minister Māris Kučinskis, former Minister of Regional Development Kaspars Gerhards and current Minister of Environmental Protection and Regional Development Juris Pūce all called for Ušakovs to resign as well.

On 13 December Ušakovs called an extraordinary city council meeting to ask for a mandate of confidence, receiving support from 32 of 60 municipal councilors, while the opposition councilors walked out of the meeting.

On 30 January 2019 the Corruption Prevention and Combating Bureau searched Ušakovs' office and residence in relation to an ongoing criminal probe. The next day Harmony released a statement fully supporting Ušakovs and called the actions "a politically motivated attempt by a single party to change the outcome of the election".

On 9 February 2019, Harmony organized a demonstration outside the Riga Town Hall attended by around 3,000 people, many of whom expressed support for Ušakovs. Two days before the protest the State Police launched a criminal case for inciting ethnic hatred over posters appearing both on social media and on the streets showing Nazi officers taking away Ušakovs dressed like a concentration camp inmate with a notice saying "Because he’s Russian" in Latvian (Tāpēc, ka krievs). Harmony said the posters have not been circulated by them and called police to investigate the source and goals of the posters.

On 28 February Pūce demanded Ušakovs to provide a detailed overview for the state of Rīgas Satiksmes' financial affairs and planned steps to stabilize the situation in the company after the interim chairperson of Rīgas Satiksme Anrijs Matīss announced the same day that the company would need 37 million euros in March to avoid insolvency. On 5 March Matīss resigned, citing lack of support from Ušakovs for changes in the company.

==== Dismissal and resignation (2019) ====
On 5 April 2019, Minister of Environmental Protection and Regional Development of Latvia Juris Pūce suspended Ušakovs from his position of mayor, citing at least eight legal and regulatory violations. Ušakovs called the action "absolutely illegal" and "heavily politicized" and promised to fight it in court. Upon his removal, Ušakovs signed an order for recently selected vice-mayor Oļegs Burovs to assume the duties of mayor.

On 17 May 2019 Ušakovs' plea against Riga City Council deputy Vilnis Ķirsis for indirectly referring to Ušakovs and Ameriks as "the face of corruption" was rejected by the Riga City Vidzeme Suburb Court and Ušakovs was ordered to pay 1,000 euros to Ķirsis to cover litigation costs.

After being elected into the European Parliament, Ušakovs submitted his resignation on 29 May 2019, but vowed to continue fighting against his dismissal in court. On 8 April 2020 his appeal was rejected by the Administrative District Court who concluded that the dismissal was necessary, reasonable and proportional to the uncovered violations.

=== European Parliament (2019–present) ===
On 25 February Latvian Television reported of unofficial information that Ušakovs and Ameriks will run in the upcoming European Parliament elections for the first time ever, replacing the previously announced Harmony lead candidate Vjačeslavs Dombrovskis, despite Ušakovs previously stating he has no intention of running for the European Parliament. The next day Ušakovs and Ameriks confirmed their run for the European Parliament and Ušakovs denied speculation that the reason for changing his mind was the ongoing corruption investigation into Rīgas Satiksme. The campaign was successful and Ušakovs and Ameriks were both elected to the European Parliament. He has since been serving on the Committee on Budgets. In addition to his committee assignments, he is part of the Parliament's delegations for relations with the United States and to the Euronest Parliamentary Assembly.

He is currently one of two Latvian MEPs who, along with Ivars Ijabs, are members of the European Parliament Intergroup on LGBT Rights.

== Collapse at the Riga Half Marathon ==
On Sunday 22 May 2011 Ušakovs collapsed after consuming an energy drink while taking part in the Riga Marathon half marathon event. He was immediately placed in intensive care at Pauls Stradiņš Clinical University Hospital with signs of severe hyperthermia. Ušakovs was placed in an induced coma state. On 24 May he was transported to Berlin for further treatment at the Charité Hospital. The Latvian medical authorities had previously declared his condition "serious but stable."

On 30 May doctors awoke him from an induced coma state. He fully recovered in the following weeks and resumed his duties on 12 July. More than 213 000 lats were donated for Ušakovs, of which 48 053 lats were used to cover the treatment expenses, while the rest was directed to charity for children treatment abroad.

== Controversy ==
On 17 November 2011, founder and editor of the Russian-language news website Kompromat Leonīds Jākobsons began publishing e-mail correspondence from 2008 to 2009 between Ušakovs and advisor of the Russian embassy in Riga Alexander Hapilov, an alleged Russian intelligence agent, concerning funding of 2009 Latvian municipal elections. Ušakovs filed a complaint against Jēkabsons and on 23 November 2011, a criminal process was launched against Jēkabsons for "violation of confidentiality of correspondence and information transmitted over telecommunications networks". In December 2011, the State Police arrested Jākobsons and searched his apartment, confiscating multiple data storage devices and two computers. The arrest was strongly condemned by Reporters Without Borders. On 29 May 2011 Jēkabsons was beaten, burned and slashed in the face with a sharp object by two unidentified attackers, who Jēkabsons believed were linked to his recent publications about Ušakovs. After the incident, Ušakovs voiced his support for Jākobsons on Twitter, ending with "I have an alibi :)". The phrase was publicly condemned as cynical. In 2016 Jākobsons was cleared of all charges, in regard to publication of Ušakovs' correspondence.

In September 2014 Ušakovs sparked controversy in an interview with the Russian television channel Dozhd, where he said, "For us at the moment, President Vladimir Putin is the best one we could have because, if he wasn't there, then power would not go to Navalny", adding that "The presidents that could be in his place would not bring stability to the neighborhood".

Two weeks before the 2017 Latvian municipal elections on 3 June a documentary titled Pārgājiens (Walkabout) on Ušakovs' road to becoming the Riga Mayor premiered at the Splendid Palace cinema. Producer and sports organizer Raimonds Elbakjans claimed the film was not a political advertisement but a genuine inspirational "documentary"; however, the Corruption Prevention and Combating Bureau later found that "Harmony" had partially financed it (i.e. the film making, broadcasting and pre-release) and classified it as a "pre-election campaigning", fining "Harmony" for 250 euros.

In March 2018 The Baltic Center for Investigative Journalism Re:Baltica published an investigation claiming that over a period of three years Ušakovs "has spent more than 8 million euros of taxpayer money on promoting himself" and the "money has been spent buying up airtime, employing people in youth organizations connected to the ruling party, and promoting mayor on social networks." The Corruption Prevention and Combating Bureau concluded that there are no violations, pointing out that "the published articles didn’t indicate that Ušakovs was a candidate and there was no evidence that these posts had been paid for by the city". Ušakovs called the research biased and unsuccessfully filed a criminal suit for defamation against Re:Baltica. Ušakovs appealed the decision, but his appeal was also rejected.

Preceded by Jānis Birks	Mayor of Riga; 2009–2019	Succeeded by Dainis Turlais
