= Harmony Centre =

Latvian left-wing political alliance

Harmony Centre Saskaņas Centrs Центр согласия
- Logo (until 2014)
- Abbreviation: SC (Latvian); ЦС (Russian)
- Leader: Jānis Urbanovičs; Igors Meļņikovs
- Founder: Sergey Dolgopolov
- Founded: 9 July 2005; 6 January 2026 (re-activated)
- Headquarters: Riga, Baltā iela 5A
- Ideology: Social democracy Russian minority politics
- Political position: Left-wing
- European Parliament group: S&D (SDPS)
- Member parties: Social Democratic Party "Harmony"; Centre Party (from 2026); Socialist Party of Latvia (until 2026)
- Colours: Red; White
- Slogan: A decent life for everyone (Latvian: Pienācīga dzīve visiem; Russian: Достойная жизнь для каждого, pre-2026)
- Saeima: 0 / 100
- European Parliament: 0 / 9

Website
- saskanascentrs.lv

Harmony Centre (Latvian: Saskaņas Centrs, SC; Russian: Центр Cогласия, ЦC) is a social-democratic political alliance in Latvia. Founded in 2005, it originally consisted of five political parties: the National Harmony Party, the Socialist Party of Latvia, New Centre, the Daugavpils City Party, and the Social Democratic Party. Through a series of mergers they were eventually reduced to two: Social Democratic Party "Harmony" and the Socialist Party.

From 2014 to 2026 the alliance was dormant, until it was revived with the Socialist Party being replaced by the Centre Party.

Ideologically a catch-all grouping of centre-left, left-wing and radical left (until 2026) parties, the alliance also aimed to represent the interests of Russians in Latvia.

== History ==
Founded on 9 July 2005, Harmony Centre emerged from For Human Rights in a United Latvia, an electoral alliance formed by the National Harmony Party, the Socialist Party and Equal Rights, that partially dissolved in 2003. Equal Rights represented the interests of the Russian minority and the Russian language in Latvia. The National Harmony Party, New Centre and the Daugavpils City Party joined at foundation, the Socialist Party in December 2005 and the Social Democratic Party in January 2009. The alliance aimed to consolidate the Latvian centre-left and promote Latvian-Russian amity. The first chairman was the head of New Centre, Sergey Dolgopolov, who was replaced in Autumn 2005 by First Baltic Channel journalist Nils Ušakovs.

In 2010 and 2011 the National Harmony Party, New Centre, Social Democratic Party and Daugavpils City Party merged to form the Social Democratic Party "Harmony", which continued in alliance with the Socialist Party until 2014.

In its first nine years of existence, Harmony Centre became the largest political force in the Latvian Parliament but remained in opposition. Various positions on Latvia's national question, citizenship law and close relations with United Russia, perceived by the mainstream parties as incompatible with Latvian national interests, led to the alliance being excluded from government.

In 2014, Harmony and the Socialist Party participated separately in the European election of that year and the alliance, although remaining registered, became inactive. In the 2018 parliamentary election Harmony once again received the most votes, securing 23 out of 100 seats in the Latvian parliament, but was left outside the coalition. A crushing loss followed in the 2022 election, with Harmony losing all seats in the Saeima.

On January 7, 2026, Harmony leader Jānis Urbanovičs announced the revival of the alliance. The Socialist Party of Latvia had quit and was replaced by the populist Centre Party. Urbanovičs said that the LSP left the alliance due to "differing perceptions on the war in Ukraine and global events".

== Election results ==
=== Legislative elections ===
Election	Party leader	Performance					Rank	Government
Election	Party leader	Votes	%	± pp	Seats	+/–	Rank	Government
2006	Jānis Urbanovičs	130,887	14.52	New	17 / 100	New	4th	Opposition
2010	Jānis Urbanovičs	251,400	26.61	▲12.09	29 / 100	▲12	▲2nd	Opposition
2011	Nils Ušakovs	259,930	28.62	▲2.01	31 / 100	▲4	▲1st	Opposition
2014	Nils Ušakovs	209,887	23.15	▼5.47	24 / 100	▼4	1st	Opposition
2018	Did not participate							
2022	Did not participate							
2026	Jānis Urbanovičs	6,598	0.82	▼22.33	0 / 100	▼0	▼13th	Extra-parliamentary

=== European Parliament elections ===
Election	Party leader	Performance					Rank
Election	Party leader	Votes	%	± pp	Seats	+/–	Rank
2009	Alfrēds Rubiks	154,894	19.93	New	2 / 8	New	2nd

== Political positions ==
Social democracy, progressive income taxation, minority rights, participatory democracy, internationalisation of higher education, good relations with Russia. Economically, Harmony Centre supported increased social spending, in order to boost the economy and increase general welfare.

=== On the occupation of Latvia ===
Both chairman of "Harmony Centre's" Parliamentary faction Jānis Urbanovičs and leader of the alliance Nils Ušakovs have rejected calling Soviet occupation of Latvia in 1940 an "occupation", arguing that from the perspective of international law it was an "annexation" instead, because Kārlis Ulmanis actively collaborated with Soviet representatives in Latvia, and compared recognizing occupation of Latvia to repressions against the society. However, they admitted that "If it had been clearly stated already at the very beginning that recognizing the fact would in no way harm people who immigrated during the Soviet times, Harmony Center would agree to recognize even ten such occupations."

Ušakovs has emphasized that "no doubt Latvia was forcibly annexed by the Soviet Union and it was followed by brutal Stalinist regime crimes against Latvia and its people", but also believed it's important to say that Soviet regime ended when the then-Russian Armed Forces left the country, claiming that otherwise, certain political forces could bring up "de-occupation" again. Later Urbanovičs summarized similarly: "there were occupations in Latvia, there are no occupiers". Both of them have also proposed to postpone the debate on national and historical issues and focus on the economic and social problems instead.

MP from Harmony Centre Boriss Cilevičs has pointed out that no official documents testify Harmony Centre recognizing the occupation. MEP from Harmony Centre and chairman of the Socialist Party of Latvia, one of the parties making up Harmony Centre, Alfrēds Rubiks has also declared that he has never recognized Latvia’s occupation and never will, because he believes the country was not occupied by the Soviet Union.

=== On the Revolution of Dignity and Russo-Ukrainian war ===
Urbanovičs blamed the Revolution of Dignity on what he believed were the "West's efforts to sabotage Russian plans for a Eurasian Customs Union" and called the annexation of Crimea by the Russian Federation "a desperate measure on the part of Russia in order to prevent economic and military imbalance in the contact zone of Southeastern Europe between NATO and Russia", citing the precedent of Abrene County as a partial justification.

Ušakovs has said he fully supports Ukrainian territorial integrity, "including Crimea", but did not want to analyze who was to blame for what happened in Ukraine and called for an international investigation. He also criticised EU sanctions against Russia as ineffective and damaging for the Latvian economy. On 4 March 2014, 28 Harmony Centre deputies voted against a resolution of the Saeima that strongly condemned Russia's military involvement and aggression in Ukraine.
