= Raimonds Rubiks =

Latvian politician (born 1963)

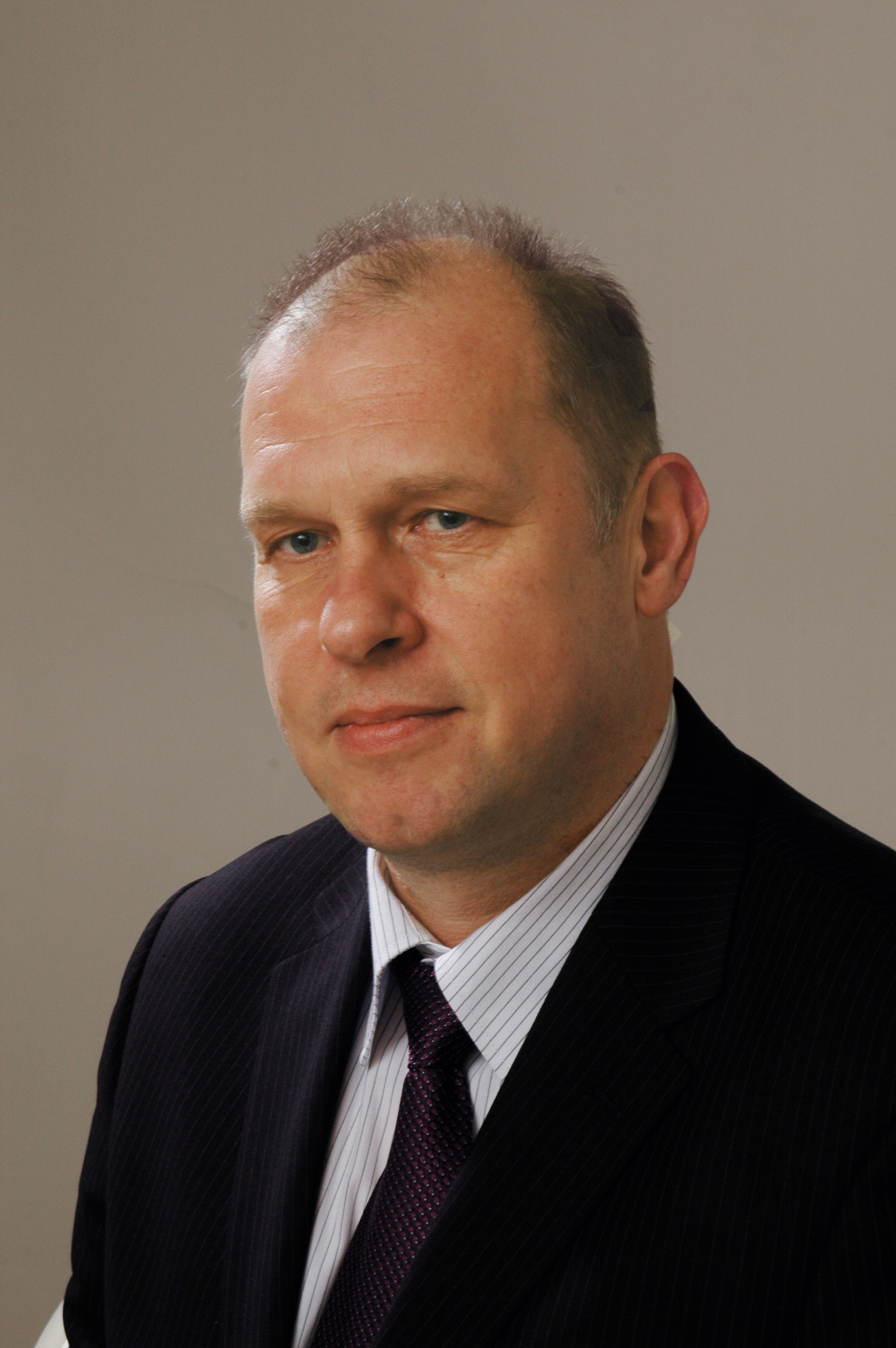

Deputy of the Saeima
- In office 2011-2018

Personal details
- Born: 9 June 1963 (age 62) Riga, Latvian SSR
- Party: Socialist Party of Latvia
- Other political affiliations: Harmony

Raimonds Rubiks (born 9 June 1963) is a Latvian politician, the son of Alfrēds Rubiks and the brother of Artūrs Rubiks. He is a member of Harmony and is also affiliated with the Socialist Party of Latvia.
