= Daugavpils City Party =

Former Latvian political party

Daugavpils City Party Daugavpils pilsētas partija
- Abbreviation: DPP
- Chairman: Vitālijs Azarevičs
- Founder: Aleksejs Vidavskis
- Founded: 26 January 2000
- Dissolved: 22 January 2011
- Split from: Latvian Social Democratic Workers' Party
- Merged into: Social Democratic Party "Harmony"
- Headquarters: Daugavpils, Teātra iela 13, LV-5401
- Membership (2011): 230
- Ideology: Daugavpils regionalism
- Political position: Big tent
- National affiliation: Harmony Centre
- Colours: Blue
- Seats in the 10th Saeima: 1 / 100
- Seats in the 5th Daugavpils dome: 3 / 15

The Daugavpils City Party (Latvian: Daugavpils pilsētas partija, DPP) was a regionalist political party located in Daugavpils, Latvia. It was formed in 2000 and was led by Daugavpils Mayor Vitālijs Azarevičs.

In 2005 the party entered the electoral alliance Harmony Centre. Harmony Centre won 26.0% and 29 seats in the 2010 election. The DPP was represented by 1 MP. In 2011 the party merged into the centre-left Harmony party.

== Election results ==
=== Legislative elections ===
Election	Party leader	Performance					Rank	Government
Election	Party leader	Votes	%	± pp	Seats	+/–	Rank	Government
2002	Aleksejs Vidavskis	189,088	19.09	New	1 / 100	New	2nd	Opposition (Note: For Human Rights in United Latvia list won 25 seats - 12 went to TSP - 8 to Equal Rights - 5 to LSP)
2006	Aleksejs Vidavskis	130,887	14.52	▼4.57	1 / 100	0	▼4th	Opposition (Note: Harmony Centre list won 17 seats - 11 went to TSP - 4 to LSP - 2 to JC - 1 to DPP)
2010	Aleksejs Burunovs	251,400	26.61	▲12.09	1 / 100	0	▲2nd	Opposition (Note: Harmony Centre list won 29 seats - 24 went to SDPS - 4 went to SPL - 1 to DCP)

=== Daugavpils dome elections ===
Election	Party leader	Performance					Rank	Government
Election	Party leader	Votes	%	± pp	Seats	+/–	Rank	Government
2001	Aleksejs Vidavskis		32.08	New	5 / 15	New	1st	Coalition
2005	Aleksejs Vidavskis	130,887	36.21	▲4.13	6 / 15	▲1	1st	Coalition
2009	Vitālijs Azarevičs	6,370	18.24	▼17.97	3 / 15	▲3	▼3rd	Opposition
