= Amendments to the Citizenship Law (popular initiative, Latvia) =

2012 amendments to the Citizenship Law of Latvia

Amendments to the Citizenship Law of Latvia, suggested by a popular initiative in 2012, sought to grant citizenship of Latvia, starting in 2014, to those non-citizens who would not refuse it. The proposed amendments were rejected by the Central Election Commission. The CEC decision was contested by the proponents of the amendments, who applied to court. The court proceedings were suspended in 2013, with the Supreme Court requesting the Constitutional Court to decide on the compliance of some applicable provisions with the Constitution.

== The draft law and gathering signatures ==
In 2011, the party ForHRUL initiated gathering signatures (certified by notaries) for amendments to the Citizenship law. The amendments provide to add to the Section 2 of the law (establishing which groups form the circle of citizens of Latvia) the following Clause 6: “Since 1 January 2014 – non-citizens, who have not submitted an application on keeping the status of a non-citizen until 30 November 2013, in a manner to be determined by the Cabinet of Ministers” and to add some transitional provisions.

In May, 2012, the Minister of Justice Gaidis Bērziņš has commented on the collection of signatures through his spokesperson, stating that the public officials should "exclude the opportunity to be involved in a situation which could be understood as subversive and compromising" The parliamentary group of the Harmony Centre has filed a question to the minister, considering him to exert pressure upon notaries.

In August, 2012, it was announced, that the 10,000 signatures, necessary at the first stage, are collected. Prime Minister Valdis Dombrovskis has expressed hope that there will be no second stage of gathering signatures and called the Central Election Commission to consider, whether the second stage should be conducted. The President's chancery invited the CEC to consider not only the legal drafting, but also the content of the draft law.

== Consideration by the Central Election Commission ==
On 4 September 2012, the signatures were submitted to the Central Election Commission. On 27 September, the CEC postponed deciding on the destiny of the draft law.

The CEC' verification confirmed that the draft law was signed by the necessary number of voters (12,686 valid signatures of citizens, while 10,000 were needed at the organisers' paid stage). On 1 November 2012, the CEC decided by 6 votes to 2 with 1 abstaining, that the draft law is not consistent with the Constitution, namely the state continuity doctrine, and consequently cannot be considered fully elaborated; therefore it should not be referred to the state-paid stage of collection of signatures.

== Trials ==
The CEC decision was appealed against in two lawsuits, by those who submitted the draft law to CEC and by one of those who signed the draft law, both cases being launched in November, according to the general order of appeals against CEC decisions (before the administrative district court).

On December 11, 2012, a set of amendments to the law on legislative initiatives, adopted on November, 8, came into force. It provides the CEC with the competence to refuse gathering signatures on the grounds of draft law not conforming with the Constitution and provides for a special way of judicial review - such CEC refusals are appealed against before the Department of Administrative Cases of the Supreme Court and must be adjudicated during one month. The administrative district court transferred both cases to the Department of Administrative Cases of the Supreme Court.

On 11 February 2013, the Department of Administrative Cases of the Supreme Court has adopted a decision to adjourn the proceedings in the case and to request the Constitutional Court to evaluate whether the draft law conforms with the Constitution and Declaration of Independence. The decision was described as unexpected in the legal journal "Jurista vārds": the opinions of the experts invited by the journal have ranged from "The Senate's actions are well-grounded" to "haven't they mentioned that the Constitutional Court does not evaluate draft laws?".

On 20 February, the Department of Administrative Cases of the Supreme Court reconsidered its own decision and asked the Constitutional Court another question instead - whether the provisions of the amended law on legislative initiative, which give the competence to review the constitutionality of the draft laws to the CEC and the Supreme Court, conform with Article 1 of the Constitution (the principle of separation of powers).

On 12 March, the Constitutional Court has launched proceedings on the application by the Department of Administrative Cases of the Supreme Court. On 18 December, the Constitutional Court decided that CEC's and the Supreme Court's competence is constitutional, provided that they only stop initiatives obviously contradicting the Constitution.

On 12 February 2014, the Supreme Court has delivered the judgment considering the CEC decision to be lawful.
