= Artūrs Rubiks =

Latvian politician (born 1970)

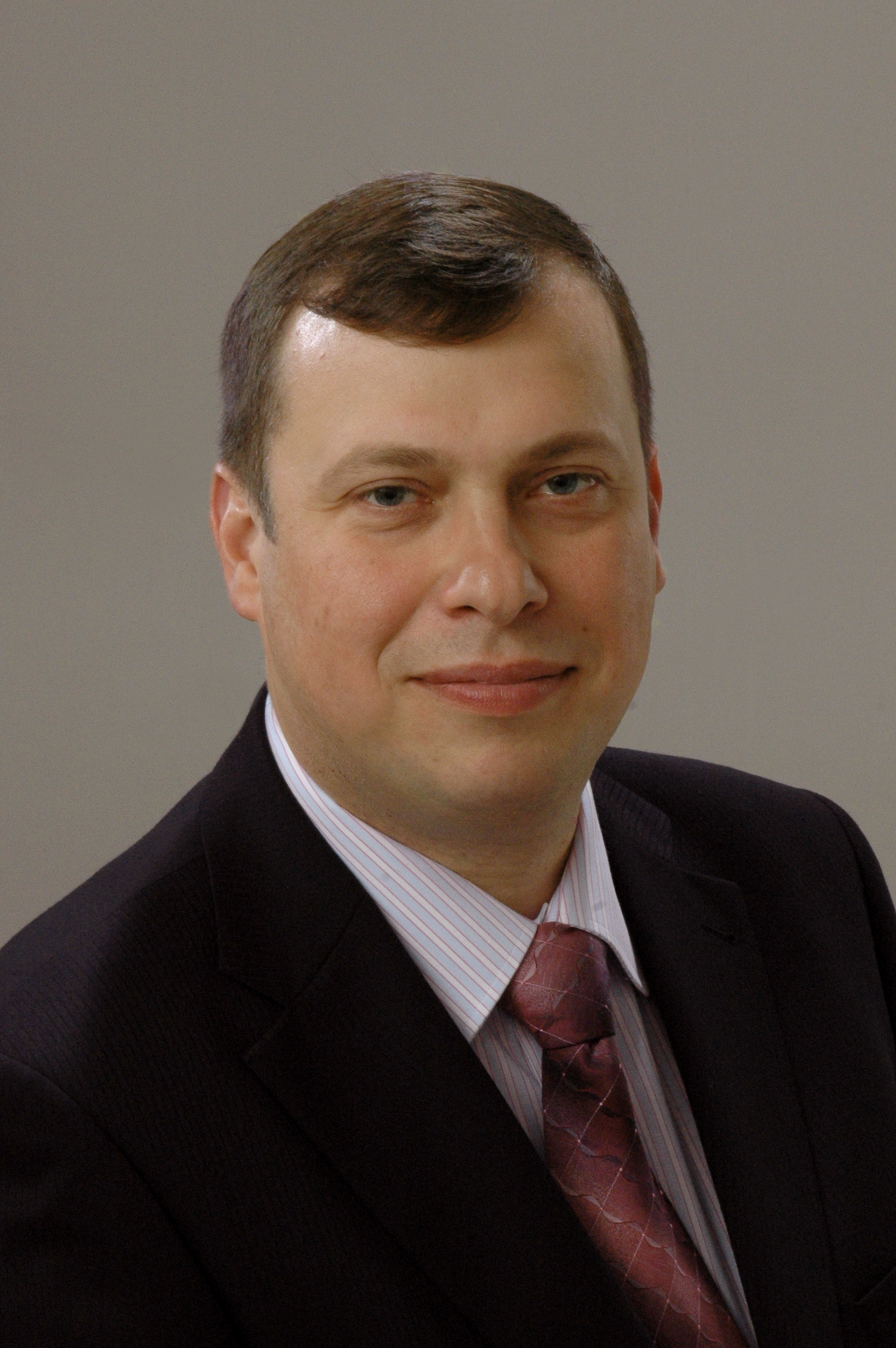

Deputy of the Saeima
- In office 2006–2022

Personal details
- Born: 16 August 1970 (age 55) Riga, Latvian SSR
- Party: Socialist Party of Latvia
- Other political affiliations: Harmony

Artūrs Rubiks (born 16 August 1970) is a Latvian politician, the son of Alfrēds Rubiks and the brother of Raimonds Rubiks. He was a deputy of the 9th, 10th, 11th and 12th Saeima. He is a member of the Socialist Party of Latvia than ran in most elections on the Harmony party list.
