= New Centre (Latvia) =

Former Latvian political party

New Centre Jaunais Centrs Новый центр
- Abbreviation: JC (Latvian); НЦ (Russian)
- Leader: Sergejs Dolgopolovs
- Founded: 20 November 2004
- Dissolved: 10 February 2010
- Split from: National Harmony Party
- Merged into: Social Democratic Party "Harmony"
- Headquarters: Riga, Ģertrūdes iela 20-5a, LV-1011
- Youth wing: Patrioti.lv
- Membership (2005): 1,097
- Ideology: Social democracy Russian minority politics
- Political position: Centre-left
- National affiliation: Harmony Centre
- Colours: Maroon; White
- Seats in the 9th Saeima: 2 / 100

Website
- jaunaiscentrs.lv

New Centre (Latvian: Jaunais Centrs, JC; Russian: Но́вый центр) was a centre-left political party in Latvia. In 2005, the JC entered the Harmony Centre coalition, which won 17 seats in the 2006 election. It merged into the Harmony party in 2010.

== Election results ==
=== Legislative elections ===
| Election | Party leader | Performance | | | | | Rank | Government |
| Election | Party leader | Votes | % | ± pp | Seats | +/– | Rank | Government |
|---|---|---|---|---|---|---|---|---|
| 2006 | Sergejs Dolgopolovs | 130,887 | 14.52 | New | 2 / 100 | New | 4th | Opposition (Note: Harmony Centre list won 17 seats - 11 went to TSP - 4 to LSP - 2 to JC - 1 to DPP) |
