= Centre Party (Latvia) =

Latvian political party

Centre Party Centra partija
- Abbreviation: CP
- Leader: Normunds Grostiņš
- Founded: 11 November 2005; 20 years ago (All-Latvian Party 21st Century); 8 December 2009; 16 years ago (Latvian movement "SOLIDARITY"); 25 July 2016; 10 years ago (Latvian Centrist Party); 7 November 2018; 7 years ago (Centre Party)
- Headquarters: Riga, Jūrmalas gatve 93 k-2 - 68, LV-1029
- Ideology: Christian conservatism Right-wing populism Euroscepticism
- Political position: Right-wing
- National affiliation: Harmony Centre (since 2026); Pamats-LV (2023–2025)
- Colours: Maroon; White
- Saeima: 0 / 100
- European Parliament: 0 / 8

Website
- centrapartija.lv

Centre Party (Latvian: Centra partija) is a political party in Latvia. It was founded on 11 November 2005 under the name "All-Latvian Party 21st Century" (Latvian: Vislatvijas partija "21. gadsimts"), renamed the Latvian movement "SOLIDARITY" (Latvian: Latvijas kustība "SOLIDARITĀTE") in 2009, in 2016 became the Latvian Centrist Party (Latvian: Latvijas centriskā partija), but since November 7, 2018 has been operating under the current name. The party advertises itself as a "patriotic, Christian-conservative party representing the majority of Latvian society."

== History ==
On July 25, 2016, it was transformed into the Latvian Centrist Party. At that time, Aleksandra Siliniece, Aivars Silinieks and Andžejs Zdanovičs were on the party board.

On August 7, 2018, the party submitted its list of candidates for the Saeima elections. The party's program included the restoration of the lats as the national currency and its withdrawal from NATO. In the elections, the Latvian Centrist Party received the lowest voter support - 0.11%, which was significantly less than the number of invalid ballot papers handed over.

In the 2019 European Parliament elections, starting as a Centre Party, the leader of the party list was Normunds Grostiņš. In the election campaign, party advocated a traditional family, a society based on traditional values and compensation from the European Union for 15 years of discrimination against Latvia as a member. Among their candidates was Waldemar Herdt from the Alternative for Germany.

The Centre Party participated unsuccessfully in the Riga City Council's elections in 2020 and promised to reduce heating costs, support the residents of denationalized houses and gradually switch to free public transport in Riga. The first number of the party list was Jānis Valtervitenheims, the second was Normunds Grostiņš. The ticket placed last, with a mere 0.16% of the vote.

The party did not participate in the 2022 Latvian parliamentary election, however, multiple members (e.g. party leader Normunds Grostiņš, Juris Aleksejevs and Andžejs Zdanovičs) ran on the Latvian Russian Union ticket.

In 2023, the party formed an alliance with the Latvian Russian Union called Pamats-LV ('foundation', 'base'). However, after the alliance received only 1,71% of votes in the 2024 European Parliament elections, the alliance became inactive, and voted to dissolve itself on 14 August 2025. On January 7, 2026, a revival of the Harmony Centre alliance was announced, with the Center Party joining forces with the Social Democratic Party "Harmony".

== Election results ==
=== Legislative elections ===
Election	Party leader	Performance					Rank	Government
Election	Party leader	Votes	%	± pp	Seats	+/–	Rank	Government
2026 (Note: Harmony Centre list won 0 seats)	Normunds Grostiņš	6,598	0.82	New	0 / 100	New	▲13th	Extra-parliamentary

=== European Parliament elections ===
Election	List leader	Votes	%	Seats	+/–	EP Group
2019	Normunds Grostiņš	2,312	0.49 (#12)	0 / 8	New	–
2024	Inna Djeri	8,925	1.73 (#12)	0 / 9	0	–
