= Miroslavs Mitrofanovs =

Latvian politician

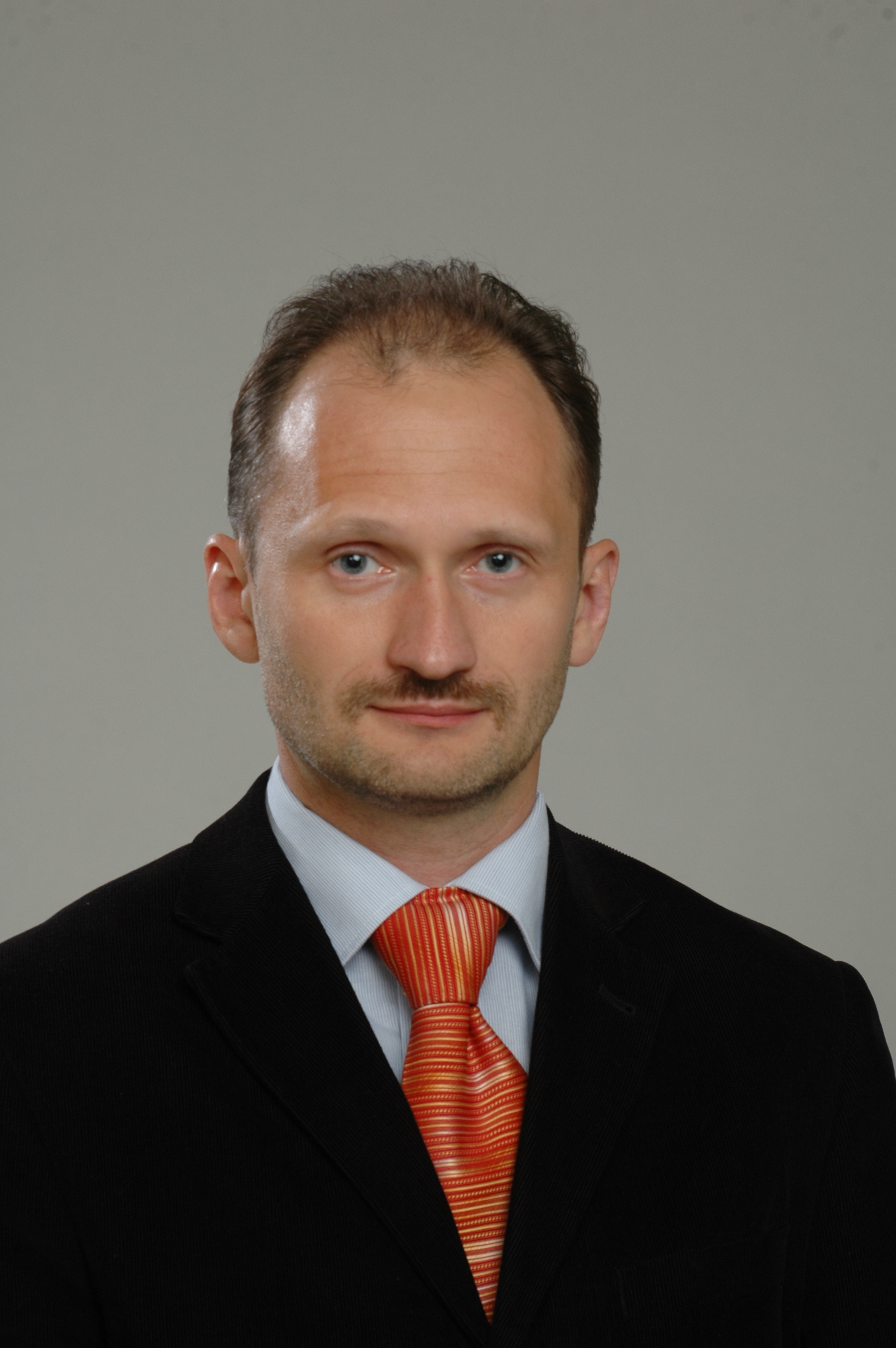

Member of the European Parliament
- In office 2018–2019
- Preceded by: Tatjana Ždanoka
- Constituency: Latvia

Member of the Saeima
- In office November 2006 – November 2010
- Constituency: Latgale

Member of the Saeima
- In office November 1998 – November 2002
- Constituency: Latgale

Personal details
- Born: 18 December 1966 (age 59) Daugavpils, Soviet Union
- Citizenship: USSR (until 1991); Latvia (since 1991)
- Party: Latvian Russian Union/LRU (2014–2024); For Human Rights in a United Latvia/ForHRUL (2007–2014); Equal Rights (1994–2007)
- Other political affiliations: European Free Alliance
- Education: University of Latvia
- Profession: biologist

Miroslavs Mitrofanovs or Miroslav Mitrofanov (Russian: Миросла́в Бори́сович Митрофа́нов, Miroslav Borisovich Mitrofanov; born 18 December 1966 in Daugavpils, Soviet Union) is a Latvian Russian journalist and politician, Member of the 7th and 9th Saeima for For Human Rights in United Latvia. Co-chairman of ForHRUL (later renamed LRU) since 2011. He had been a member of the European Parliament since March 2018 until July 2019. In 2020, Mitrofanov was elected to the Riga City Council.

In 2020 Mitrofanovs, alongside his party members Tatjana Ždanoka and Andrejs Mamikins, was included in the European Platform for Democratic Elections database of "biased observers" for backing disputed and rigged elections in Russia and occupied Ukraine.
