= Juris Sokolovskis =

Latvian lawyer and politician

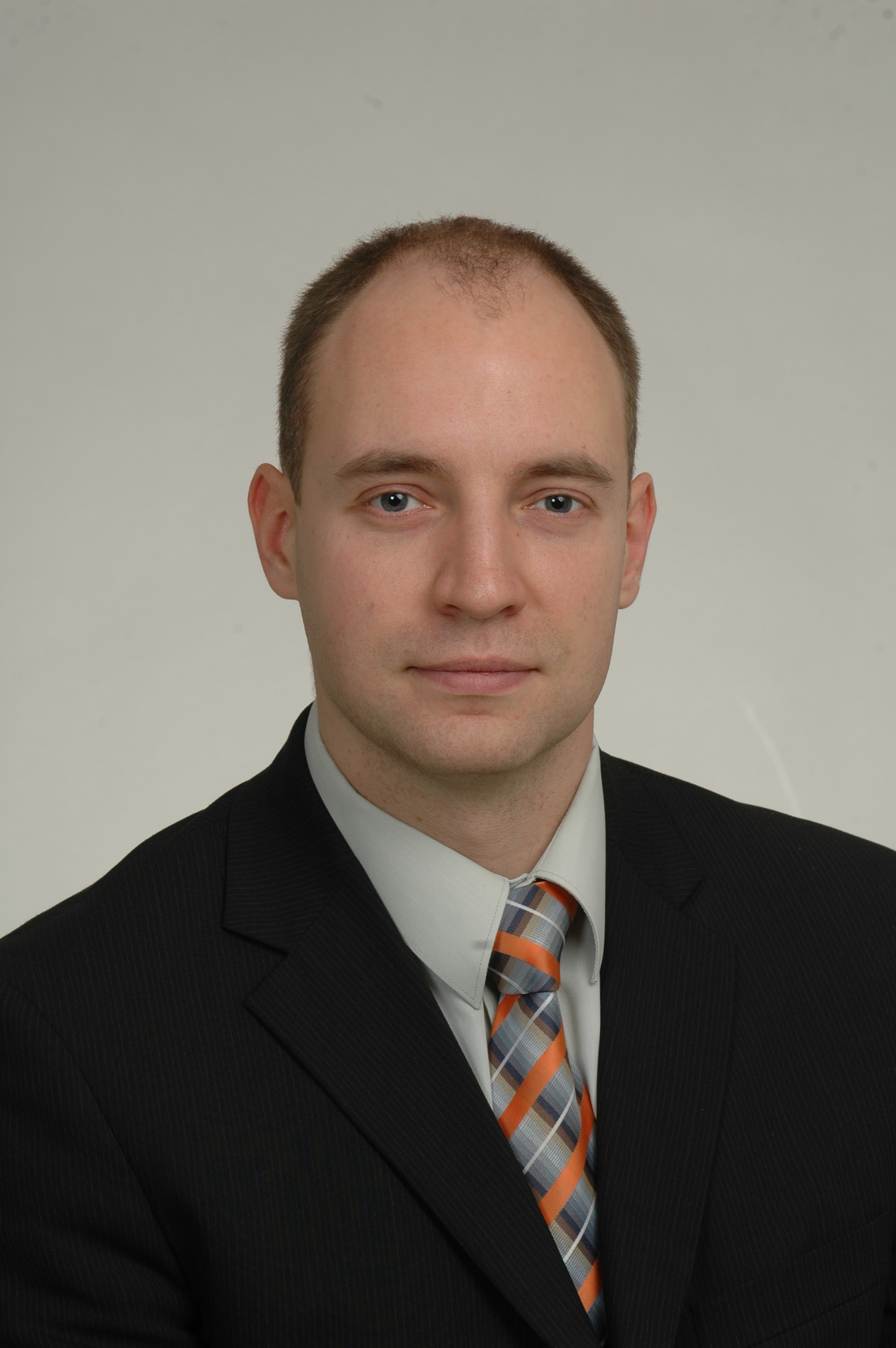
Sokolovskis in 2004

Juris Sokolovskis (Russian: Юрий Николаевич Соколовский, transcribed: Yuriy Nikolayevich Sokolovskiy) (born 13 June 1976 in Riga) is a Latvian lawyer and politician, member of the 7th, 8th and 9th Saeima, and co-chairman of ForHRUL from 2007 to 2011.

== Career ==
1996 — Took part in founding the Equal Rights party and joins the Latvian Human Rights Committee.

1998 — Elected to the 7th Saeima, becoming the youngest MP in Saeima's history.

2002 — Re-elected to Saeima.

2003 March–June — Became head of ForHRUL group in the Saeima.

2004 May–June —Temporarily serves as MEP from Latvia.

2005 — Served as the co-chairman of ForHRUL youth organization.

2006 — Re-elected to the Saeima (serving until 2010).

2007-2011 — Served as co-chairman of ForHRUL.
