= Boris Tsilevitch =

Latvian politician of Jewish descent

Boriss Cilevičs
- Boris Tsilevitch
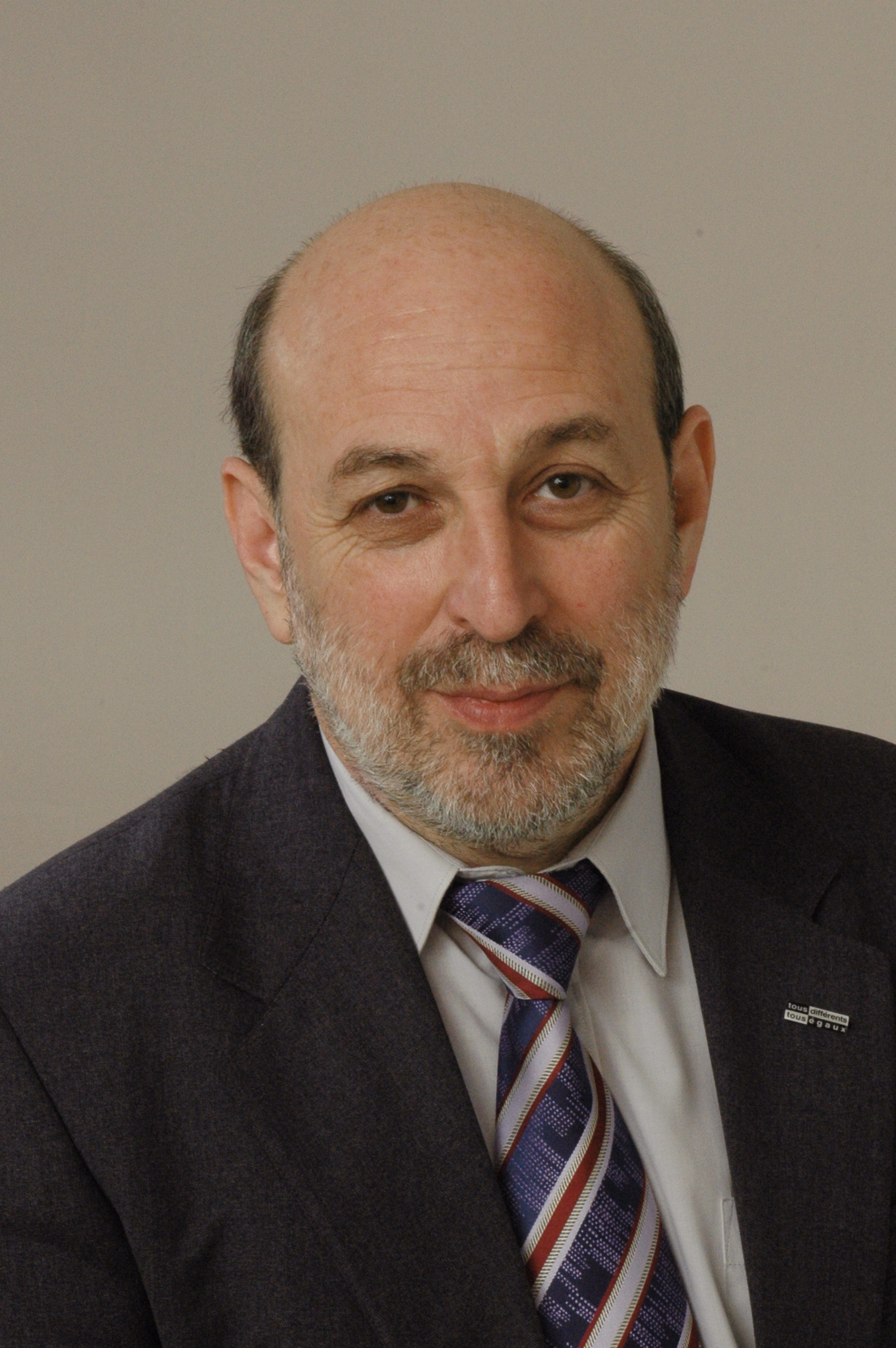

Deputy of the Saeima
- In office 1998 – 1 November 2022

Personal details
- Born: 26 March 1956 (age 70) Daugavpils, Latvia (Latvian SSR, USSR)
- Party: Harmony
- Spouse: Galina
- Children: Evgeny, Leonid

Boris Leonidovich Tsilevitch (Russian: Борис Леонидович Цилевич, Latvian: Boriss Cilevičs; born March 26, 1956) is a Latvian politician, physicist and mathematician of Jewish descent. He is a member of the Harmony party and a former deputy of the Saeima.

== Career ==
=== National politics ===
During the Singing Revolution, Cilevičs became an activist in the Popular Front of Latvia, especially during their 1990 Latvian election campaign. Later he called on creating an organization that would unite the non-citizens of Latvia.

In 1994, he was among the founders of the National Harmony Party. Although he ran unsuccessfully in the 1995 Latvian parliamentary election, he became an assistant to party MP Jānis Jurkāns. Cilēvičs was first elected to the Saeima in 1998. After the NHP merged into the Harmony party, he became its member. He went on to win a seat in every election until 2022, when Harmony failed to reach the 5% threshold.

=== European politics ===
From May to July 2004, Tsilevitch briefly served as Member of the European Parliament between the accession of Latvia and the first direct election of Latvian MEPs. During that time, he was a member of the Committee on Petitions.

In addition to his role in parliament, Tsilevitch has been serving as member of the Latvian delegation to the Parliamentary Assembly of the Council of Europe since 2011. As a member of Harmony, he was a part of the Socialist Group and was the chairperson of the Committee on the Election of Judges to the European Court of Human Rights; a member of the Committee on the Honouring of Obligations and Commitments by Member States of the Council of Europe (Monitoring Committee); a member of the Committee on Equality and Non-Discrimination; a member of the Sub-Committee on the implementation of judgments of the European Court of Human Rights; and a member Sub-Committee on the Rights of Minorities. Alongside Kerstin Lundgren of Sweden, he served as the Assembly's co-rapporteur on Georgia.

== Personal life ==
Cilevičs was born in a Jewish family in Daugavpils during the Soviet occupation of Latvia. He graduated with honors from Daugvpils 3rd Secondary School in 1973. In 1978, he graduated from the Faculty of Physics and Mathematics at the State University of Latvia and became an Candidate of Sciences in physics in 1981. After working in the microprocessor plant Alfa and at the Institute of Mathematics and Informatics at the UoL, Cilevičs switched to NGO work in the early 1990s, focusing on human rights issues, as well as journalism and writing.
