= Aleksejs Vidavskis =

Latvian politician (1943–2020)

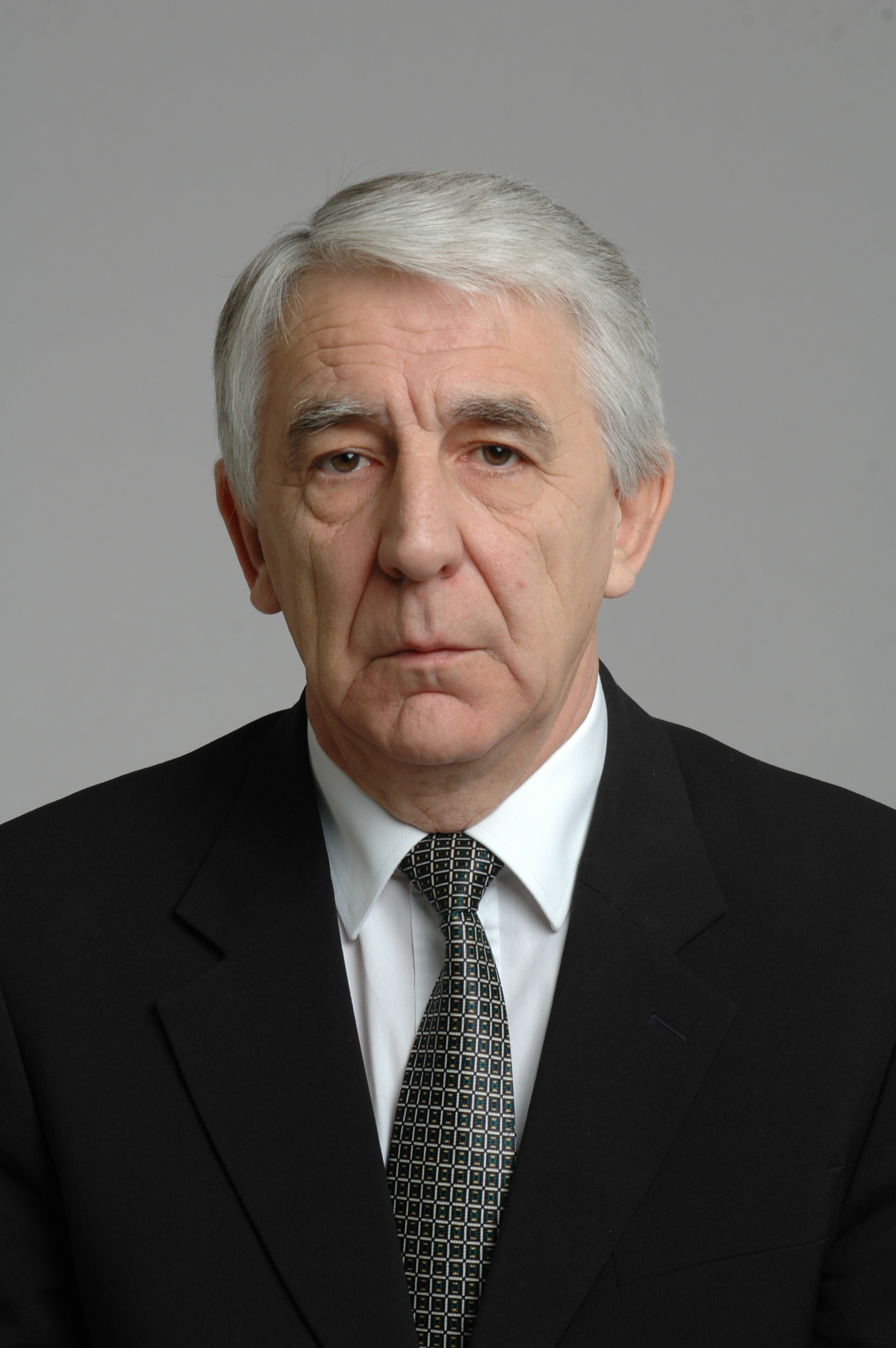

Member of the Supreme Council of Latvia
- In office 4 May 1990 – 9 July 1992

Mayor of Daugavpils
- In office 1994–2001
- Preceded by: Valdis Lauskis
- Succeeded by: Rihards Eigims

Deputy of the Saeima
- In office 5 November 2002 – 2 November 2010

Personal details
- Born: 19 September 1943 Daugavpils, Generalbezirk Lettland, Reichskommissariat Ostland (Latvia)
- Died: July 1, 2020 (aged 76)
- Resting place: Daugavpils Catholic cemetery
- Party: Harmony Centre
- Education: Riga Polytechnic Institute

Aleksejs Vidavskis (19 September 1943 – 1 July 2020) was a Latvian politician who served as a member of the Supreme Council of Latvia, as a mayor of Daugavpils, and as a deputy in the 8th and 9th Saeima (Latvian Parliament).

== Biography ==
=== Early life ===
Vidavskis was born in Daugavpils, Latvia on September 19, 1943, when the city was under Nazi control as a part of the Reichskommissariat Ostland. He graduated from the Riga Polytechnic Institute in 1979 while working various positions at the Daugavpils Chemical Fiber Factory from 1966 to 1987.

=== Political activity ===
He served as a member of the Supreme Council of Latvia from its establishment in 1990 until he and 14 other members who had voted against the Declaration of Independence were removed for "acting contrary to the Constitution."

Vidavskis was elected mayor of Daugavpils from the Harmony Centre party despite not being a member of the party at the time. He served as mayor from 1994 to 2001. He also served two terms as a deputy of the Saeima. He began his term in the 8th Saeima on November 5, 2002, and began his term in the 9th Saeima on 7 November 2006.

He supported Latvia joining the European Union in interviews.

=== Retirement and death ===
Vidavskis retired from politics after his second term in the Saeima ended on November 2, 2010. He is reported to have moved to Višķi for a quiet retirement. He died on July 1, 2020, at the age of 76, and his memorial service was held at Ss. Boris and Gleb Cathedral in Daugavpils on July 3.
