= Latvian Russian Union =

Latvian political party

Latvian Russian Union Latvijas Krievu savienība Русский союз Латвии
- Abbreviation: LKS (Latvian); РСЛ (Russian)
- Co-chairpersons: Jevgēņijs Osipovs; Andrejs Pagors
- Founded: 3 August 1998; 28 years ago (ForHRUL alliance); 19 May 2007; 19 years ago (party); 18 January 2014; 12 years ago (LKS/РСЛ)
- Merger of: Equal Rights; Free Choice in People's Europe
- Headquarters: Riga, Rūpniecības iela 9, LV 1010
- Membership (2026): ▼567
- Ideology: Russian nationalism; Russian minority politics; Russophilia; Populism
- Political position: Right-wing; Until 2014: Left-wing
- National affiliation: Sovereign Power–Alliance of Young Latvians (2025–now); Pamats-LV (2023–2025)
- European affiliation: European Free Alliance (until 2022)
- European Parliament group: Greens/EFA (2004–2022); Non-Inscrits (2022–2024)
- Colours: Blue; Red
- Saeima: 2 / 100
- European Parliament: 0 / 9
- Riga City Council: 0 / 60

Website
- rusojuz.lv

The Latvian Russian Union (LRU) or the Russian Union of Latvia (Latvian: Latvijas Krievu savienība, Russian: Русский союз Латвии, romanized: Russkiy soyuz Latvii) (LKS) is a political party in Latvia supported mainly by ethnic Russians and other Russian-speaking minorities. The co-chairpersons of the Latvian Russian Union were Miroslavs Mitrofanovs and Tatjana Ždanoka. The party is currently a member of the Sovereign Power–Alliance of Young Latvians since around 2025.

The party emphasizes issues important to the Russian minority in Latvia. It requests the granting of Latvian citizenship to all of Latvia's remaining non-citizens and supports Russian and Latgalian as co-official languages in municipalities where at least 20% of the population are native speakers of such a language. It supports stronger ties with Russia and was the only major political organization to oppose Latvia's membership in NATO.

== History ==
=== As ForHRUL (1998–2014) ===
==== As an electoral alliance (1998–2007) ====
The party originated as the electoral alliance For Human Rights in a United Latvia (ForHRUL) (Latvian: Par cilvēka tiesībām vienotā Latvijā, PCTVL; Russian: За права человека в единой Латвии, ЗаПЧЕЛ), established in May 1998 ahead of Latvia's parliamentary elections. The alliance brought together the National Harmony Party, Equal Rights originating from the Interfront movement, and the Socialist Party of Latvia succeeding the former Communist Party of Latvia, parties whose support came primarily from Russophone voters.

The alliance won 16 out of 100 seats in the 1998 parliamentary election and 25 seats in the 2002 parliamentary election, as well as 13 out of 60 seats on Riga City Council in the 2001 municipal elections. After the municipal elections, ForHRUL became part of Riga's city government and National Harmony Party member Sergey Dolgopolov became the deputy mayor of Riga City Council.

During this period, ForHRUL's most prominent leaders were Jānis Jurkāns, Alfrēds Rubiks and Tatjana Ždanoka. Jurkāns was a leader of the Popular Front of Latvia and founder of the National Harmony Party; Rubiks and Ždanoka were prominent as leaders of the Interfront movement, the Latvian branch of the Communist Party of the Soviet Union and the federalist movement in Latvia in the early 1990s. They were fairly popular in the Russian community but very unpopular among ethnic Latvians. ForHRUL therefore remained in opposition, because a coalition with Rubiks or Ždanoka was seen as a political suicide by most other elected parties.

ForHRUL partially broke up in 2003. The National Harmony Party was the first to leave the alliance and the Socialist Party followed half a year later. The remnant of ForHRUL consisted of Equal Rights and Free Choice in People's Europe. The latter was composed of dissident Socialist Party and National Harmony Party members, like Yakov Pliner, who opposed the decision to quit the alliance. This reduced grouping had only 6 members of the Saeima (out of 25 that the alliance had before the breakup). ForHRUL was the main force supporting the 2003-2005 activities of the Headquarters for the Protection of Russian Schools.

At the first Latvian election to the European Parliament in 2004, ForHRUL gained one seat, held by Tatjana Ždanoka, who sat with the Greens–European Free Alliance group in the European Parliament. It also proposed the idea of a Europe-wide party of ethnic Russians. ForHRUL supported a federal Europe, with a "common economic and political space from Lisbon to Vladivostok".

==== As a single party (2007–2014) ====
In 2007, ForHRUL was transformed into a single party that retained the name and identity of the old electoral alliance. In the years following, the party's support declined as ethnic Russian voters switched allegiance to the Harmony party, successor to the National Harmony Party. At the 2010 parliamentary election, the party lost its representation in the Latvian Parliament.

In 2011, the party launched a popular initiative to amend Latvian nationality law by granting citizenship automatically to most non-citizens. After the proposal received the required number of initial signatures, the Ministry of Justice concluded that the draft law was unconstitutional, and the Central Election Commission subsequently suspended the second stage of signature collection. This decision was eventually upheld by the Constitutional Court of Latvia and the Supreme Court of Latvia. The party also supported the 2012 initiative to make Russian a co-official language in Latvia.

=== As Latvian Russian Union (2014–present) ===
In January 2014, ForHRUL changed its name to the Latvian Russian Union. At the 2014 European Parliament election, it retained its single seat in the European Parliament. The party supported the 2014 Russian annexation of Crimea by Russia and has taken a pro-Russian stance in the subsequent Russo-Ukrainian War. In August 2014, the party signed a cooperation agreement with the Crimean branch of Russian Unity to "strengthen the unity of Russian world". During a 2014 Latvian parliamentary election campaign in Latgale it sparked controversy by comparing the region’s situation with Crimea before Russia's 2014 annexation. A party newsletter featured the cooperation agreement with Crimea’s Russian-installed leadership and expressed support for its authorities, while the party's top candidate Jurijs Zaicevs warned that continued opposition by the government of Latvia to greater official recognition of the Russian language in Latvia and automatic citizenship for non-citizens could lead to Latgale's Russian-speaking population and the whole region joining Russia.

In July 2018, Ždanoka resigned her mandate in the European Parliament to focus on the 2018 Latvian parliamentary election and was succeeded by Miroslav Mitrofanov. The party campaigned primarily against education reform affecting Russian-language schools and the disqualification of its leader, Tatjana Ždanoka, from standing as a parliamentary candidate due to her membership of the Communist Party of Latvia. Despite attracting attention through the arrest of pro-Kremlin activist Alexander Gaponenko, the party remained below the 5% electoral threshold in opinion polls. With Andrejs Mamikins as their prime minister candidate Latvian Russian Union gained 3.2% votes, failing to win any seats in Saeima, but qualifying for state funding of almost 20 000 euros a year that the party would not be able to receive since it does not possess an account in a credit institution registered in Latvia as required by the law. In 2020, the party finally succeeded in obtaining an account in a Latvian bank.

In the 2019 European Parliament election, LRU received 6.24% of the votes and gained one seat, held by Tatjana Ždanoka who personally received 18,098 plusses and was crossed out 739 times. In the 2020 Riga City Council election, the party gained 6.5% of the votes and re-entered the Riga City Council with four seats.

On April 8, 2022, the European Free Alliance suspended LRU's membership in the party due to "fundamental disagreements" regarding the 2022 Russian invasion of Ukraine, including Ždanoka voting against the European Parliament Resolution condemning it. The same month a 2013 post from the LRU council member Jevgēņijs Osipovs resurfaced and was shared by him and other members of LRU, in which he threatened with "war" if the Monument to the Liberators of Soviet Latvia and Riga from the German Fascist Invaders was moved "by even a millimetre". The monument would be demolished on 25 August 2022. A small faction of pro-Kremlin hardliners defected from the Social Democratic Party "Harmony" and joined Latvian Russia Union due to former's initial support of Ukraine.

LRU received a warning from the State Security Service for activities "aimed at justifying violations of foreign policy and international law by Russia, as well as the dissemination of propaganda messages". The party's leadership responded by warning its members "to refrain from speaking, distributing or publishing news that reflects Russia's view of this aggressive war, and to avoid publishing news from unsafe sources at all." The Corruption Prevention and Combating Bureau informed LRU that the State Security Service warning could be regarded as grounds for halting state funding to the party.

In the 2022 parliamentary election, The LRU list, which included a number of candidates that represented the populist Centre Party (e.g. Normunds Grostiņš), gathered 3.6% of the vote, which gave the party no parliamentary seats, but was enough for it to retain state funding. Latvian Russian Union's cooperation with the Centre Party with was formalized on May 2023, when both parties formed the Pamats-LV (lit. 'Foundation-LV' or 'Base-LV') party alliance in preparation for the 2024 European Parliament election. After the election, the alliance became inactive and self-dissolved on 14 August 2025.

On 11 August 2022, a citizens' initiative signed by 10,168 people calling for the dissolution of the Latvian Russian Union was referred to the Saeima's National Security Commission for consideration, although the State Security Service stated it had not identified any violations of the amended Law on Political Parties by the party.

In 2024, LRU politician Aleksandrs Filejs received a 10-month suspended prison sentence and one year of probation for publicly denying the Soviet occupation of Latvia in a 2019 Facebook post. The same year, former LRU parliamentary candidate Viktors Guščins was detained by Latvia's State Security Service during searches in Jelgava as part of a criminal investigation.

In January 2024 it was revealed that Ždanoka reportedly had been an operative for the FSB since at least 2004.

For the 2025 municipal elections, LRU decided to run candidates on the Sovereign Power–Alliance of Young Latvians (SV/AJ) lists. In Riga, party board member Jūlija Sohina was elected to the Riga City Council, but Andrejs Pagors was elected to Jelgava City Council. After the elections, LKS leader Jeļena Osipova challenged the Liepāja municipal election results, alleging ballot-handling irregularities, technical errors, and inconsistencies in the reporting of votes cast abroad after the party fell 62 votes short of the 5% electoral threshold. The appeals were rejected.

For the 2026 Latvian parliamentary election, the LKS continued to field candidates on the SV/AJ list (with 14 being either current or former members), with at least two of them being elected to the Saeima (Pagors and Sohina).

== Election results ==
=== Legislative elections ===
Election	Party leader	Performance					Rank	Government
Election	Party leader	Votes	%	± pp	Seats	+/–	Rank	Government
1998 (Note: officially participated as TSP)	Jānis Jurkāns	135,700	14.20	New	16 / 100	New	4th	Opposition
2002	Jānis Jurkāns	189,088	19.09	▲4.89	25 / 100	▲9	▲2nd	Opposition
2006	Yakov Pliner	54,684	6.06	▼13.03	6 / 100	▼19	▼7th	Opposition
2010	Juris Sokolovskis	13,847	1.47	▼4.59	0 / 100	▼6	▲6th	Extra-parliamentary
2011	Yakov Pliner	7,109	0.78	▼0.69	0 / 100	0	▼7th	Extra-parliamentary
2014	Miroslav Mitrofanov	14,390	1.59	▲0.81	0 / 100	0	7th	Extra-parliamentary
2018	Andrejs Mamikins	27,014	3.22	▲1.63	0 / 100	0	▼9th	Extra-parliamentary
2022	Andrejs Mamikins	32,688	3.67	▲0.45	0 / 100	0	▼11th	Extra-parliamentary
2026 (Note: SV/AJ list won 15 seats; 9 to SV, 4 to AJ and 2 to LKS)	Jevgēņijs Osipovs	94,211	11.87	▲8.20	2 / 100	▲2	11th	TBA

=== European Parliament ===
Election	Leader	Votes	%	Seats	+/–
2004	Tatjana Ždanoka	61,401	10.75 (#3)	1 / 9	
2009	Tatjana Ždanoka	76,436	9.84 (#3)	1 / 8	0
2014	Tatjana Ždanoka	28,303	6.43 (#5)	1 / 8	0
2019	Tatjana Ždanoka	29,546	6.28 (#5)	1 / 8	0
2024	Did not contest				

=== Riga City Council ===
Election	Votes	%	Seats	+/–
2005	27,728	13.68	9 / 60	▼4
2009	6,519	2.7	0 / 60	▼9
2020	11,170	6.5	4 / 60	▲4

== See also ==
- Giulietto Chiesa, an Italian candidate on the ForHRUL list for the 2009 European Parliament elections.
