= Jānis Urbanovičs =

Latvian politician

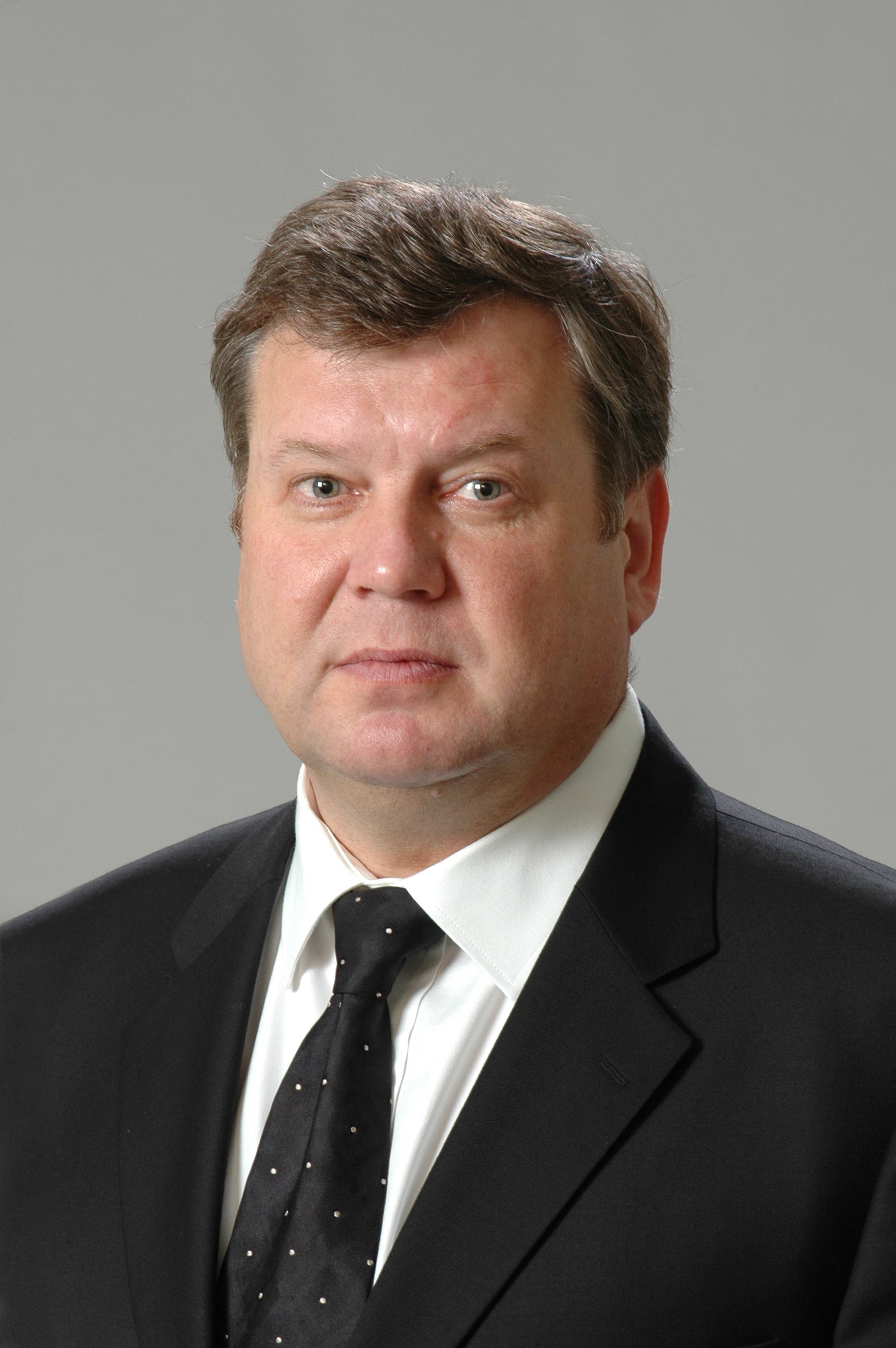

Member of the Saeima
- In office 1994–2022

Leader of Social Democratic Party "Harmony" and Opposition
- Incumbent
- Assumed office 2010

Personal details
- Born: 23 March 1959 (age 67) Rēzekne, Latvia
- Party: National Harmony Party (1995–2010); Harmony (2010–present)
- Spouse: Rita Urbanoviča
- Education: Latvia University of Agriculture
- Profession: hydraulic engineer

Jānis Urbanovičs (born 23 March 1959) is a Latvian politician and author. He has been a member of the Saeima since 1994. From 2005–2010 Urbanovičs was chairman of the National Harmony Party and from 2010–2014 and again since 2019 the chairman of Harmony.

== Biography ==
Urbanovičs was born in 1959 in Rēzekne district, Latvia, into a large devout Catholic family of modest means. During World War II his father fought Nazi Germany in the Red Army, while his uncle was in the Latvian Waffen-SS Legion. During his school years, Urbanovičs worked on different irrigation engineering projects, shaping his choice of education. In 1982, he graduated from the Latvian Academy of Agriculture as a hydraulic engineer. At the same time, he mastered cabinetmaking, which is still a hobby today. He then worked as a chief engineer leading various construction projects.

In 1984, during the early years of Perestroika, he became a part of the LĻKJS, the communist youth league where he soon gained the position of the first secretary of the Central Committee of Komsomol in the Latvian SSR. Under his direction, the organisation held conferences, discussion panels and training courses. In 1986 he actively participated in the organisation of The Chautauqua Conferences in Jūrmala on the Soviet Union–United States relations.

In 1994, Urbanovičs became a member of the first Saeima since the restoration of Latvian independence. From 2005 he was the head of the Harmony Centre electoral alliance. In 2010 he became the chairman of the newly merged Harmony. In 2012 Urbanovičs was denied the highest category access to work with state secrets, reportedly over a probe by the anti-corruption bureau into Harmony Center’s financial transparency before the parliamentary elections and a campaign for collecting signatures for a referendum on Russian.

According to the public benefit organization Delna, Urbanovičs had attended only 31% of committee meetings in the 11th Saeima, making him the leading Saeima deputy in missed parliamentary commissions. In 2012 the Corruption Prevention and Combating Bureau launched an investigation into Urbanovičs for attempting to defraud 20% of his salary as a Saeima deputy by having another person register him as being present in an April 26 parliamentary meeting, while Urbanovičs was in Moscow.

In 2014 Urbanovičs blamed the Russo-Ukrainian War on what he believed were "West's efforts to sabotage Russian plans for a Eurasian Customs Union" and called Annexation of Crimea by the Russian Federation "a desperate measure on the part of Russia in order to prevent economic and military imbalance in the contact zone of Southeastern Europe between NATO and Russia", citing the precedent of Abrene County as a partial justification.

Since 1994, Urbanovičs has participated in parliamentary delegations for liaising with the CIS and Central Asian countries. He maintains contacts with the leaders of those countries and has received awards for strengthening cultural and economic relations. He also contributed to the signing of Latvian cooperation agreements with China, Turkey, Russia, Belarus and Kazakhstan.

In 1998 Urbanovičs together with the chairman of the Institute of Contemporary Development Igor Yurgens became one of the founders of the Baltic Forum, which over time evolved into a dialogue platform for post-Soviet states. He also initiated the annual Be-La-Rus youth camp, which takes place on the borders of Latvia, Russia and Belarus.

== Books ==
Urbanovičs together with Igor Yurgens and Juris Paiders has published a series of books in Russian and Latvian titled "The Draft of the Future" (Russian: Черновики будущего, Latvian: Nākotnes melnraksti) about the history of Latvia during the Ulmanis authoritarian regime, Soviet and German occupations and Soviet re-occupation – "The Draft of the Future: Latvia 1934–1941" (2011), "The Draft of the Future: Latvia 1941–1947" (2012), "The Draft of the Future: Latvia 1948–1955" (2013) and "The Draft of the Future: Latvia 1956–1991" (2016).

== Personal life ==
Urbanovičs is married to Rita Urbanoviča, with whom he has two daughters and a son. His mother tongue is Latvian, but he also speaks Russian and Polish. Urbanovičs plays basketball and is the founder of the Harmony party basketball team.
