= Yakov Pliner =

Latvian politician

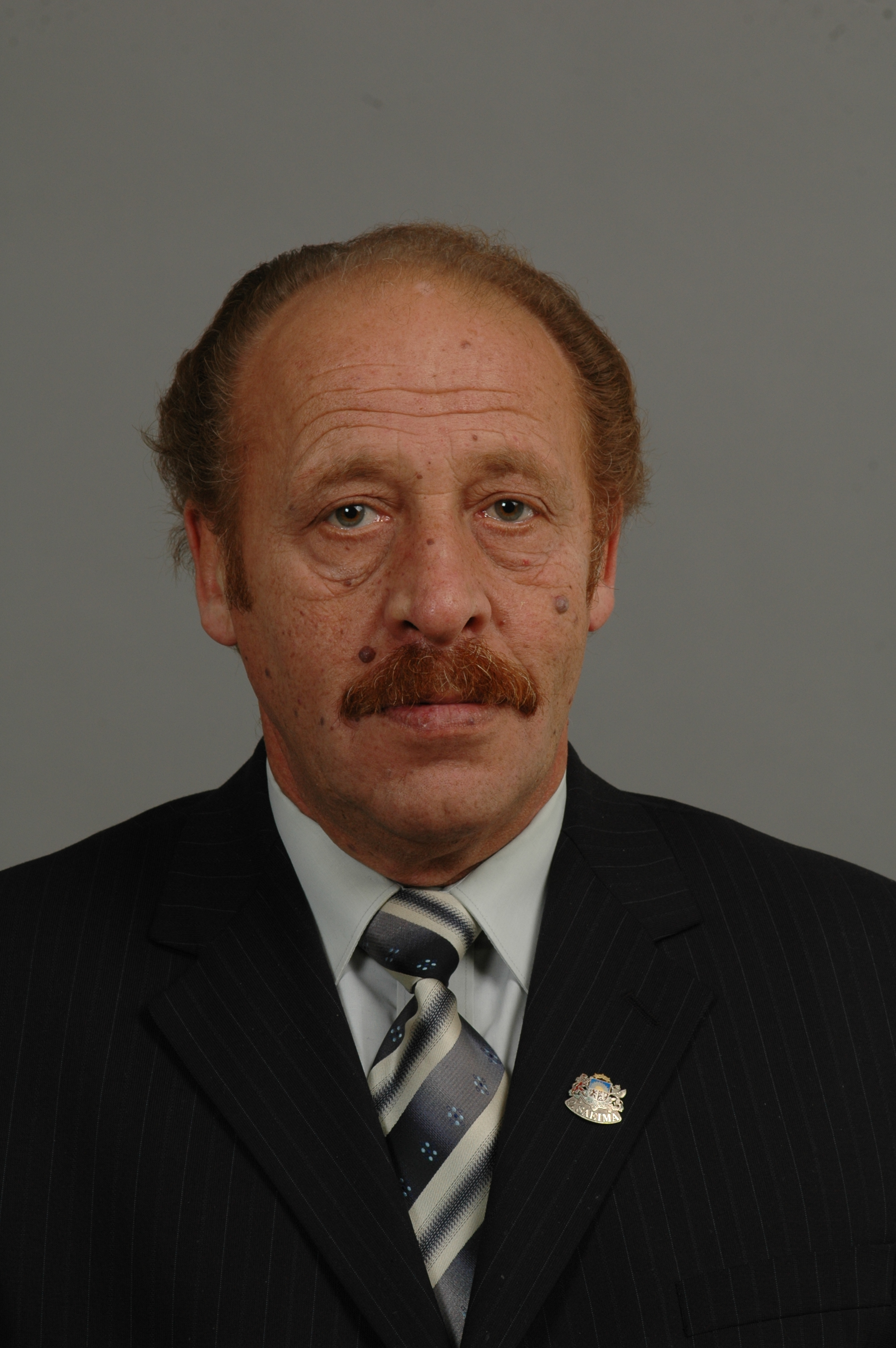
Jakovs Pliners as a deputy of the 9th Saeima

Jakovs Pliners (Russian: Я́ков Гда́льевич Пли́нер, romanized: Yakov Pliner; born 27 December 1946 in Rēzekne) is a Latvian politician and teacher of Jewish origin. He was a MP of the Saeima of the 7th, 8th and 9th convocations for the For Human Rights in United Latvia (PCTVL) alliance. He was a member of Social Democratic party group in the Baltic Assembly.

Since 2024, he is a member of the Riga City Council from the populist For Stability! party, after he left the Latvian Russian Union in 2022.

== Biography ==
1965–1970 — studied at the Teachers' Institute of Daugavpils, profession – secondary school teacher of biology and chemistry.

1970–1975 — teacher, assistant director, director of the Virbi Secondary School (Talsi district).

1975–1983 — worked in the Department of Education of Talsi Executive Committee.

1983–1993 — worked in the Ministry of Education of Latvia.

1993–1998 — founder and director of the "Eureka" (Эврика) private college of general education.

1997 — Pliner received his Dr. paed. degree from the University of Latvia, and was elected to the Riga City Council from National Harmony Party (TSP).

1998 — elected to the 7th Saeima (Parliament).

2002 — elected to the 8th Saeima.

2003 — Pliner left the TSP (which had withdrawn from the For Human Rights in a United Latvia (PCTVL) that year) and returned to the alliance. He became the leader of the newly founded party "Free Choice in People's Europe" (BITE), co-chairman of PCTVL (until 2015) and chairman of its parliamentary group. Pliners was one of the leaders of Headquarters for the Protection of Russian Schools movement, writing several publications on the language of instruction issues.

2006 — before the parliamentary elections, PCTVL named Pliners its candidate for Prime Minister. Elected to the 9th Saeima, remained chairman of the PCTVL parliamentary group and party chairman (until 2010).

2020 - After elected to the Riga City Council from the Latvian Russian Union (the successor of PCTVL).
