= Jānis Jurkāns =

Latvian politician (born 1946)

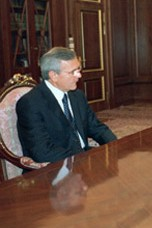
- Jurkāns in 2002

Minister of Foreign Affairs of Latvia
- In office 22 May 1990 – 10 November 1992
- President: Anatolijs Gorbunovs
- Prime Minister: Ivars Godmanis
- Preceded by: Anatols Dinbergs (as head of the Latvian diplomatic service in exile); Vilhelms Munters (1940)
- Succeeded by: Georgs Andrejevs

Personal details
- Born: 31 August 1946 (age 80) Riga, then part of Latvian SSR, Soviet Union
- Party: National Harmony Party
- Other political affiliations: Popular Front of Latvia
- Education: Latvian State University

Jānis Jurkāns (born 31 August 1946) is a Latvian politician, one of the leaders of the Popular Front of Latvia, who served as foreign minister (1990–1992).

== Biography ==
Jānis Jurkāns was born in 1946 into a family with Polish-Latvian roots. In 1974 Jurkāns graduated from the Latvian State University, majoring in English. He worked as a lecturer from 1974 to 1978. In 1989 he became an activist of the Popular Front. Jurkāns was Minister of Foreign Affairs in Latvia, 1990–1992. In 1992, Janis Jurkāns, together with 9 other Baltic Ministers of Foreign Affairs and an EU commissioner, founded the Council of the Baltic Sea States (CBSS) and the EuroFaculty.

He resigned in 1992 due to opposition to the Latvian citizenship law, that in his view threatened social harmony in the country; he also rejected territorial claims to the Abrene district. In 1994, Jurkāns founded the National Harmony Party and was the chairman of the party's faction in the Saeima (1994–1996; 1997–1998) and later of the parliamentary faction of the For Human Rights in United Latvia alliance. He was a deputy in the V, VI, VII and VIII convocations of the Saeima (1993–2006). In 2002, he visited Moscow and met Vladimir Putin, who expressed support for Jurkāns's policies. In 2005 he distanced himself from politics, concentrating on the logistics corporation "Baltijas asociācija – transports un loģistika". Nevertheless, he participated in the 2011 Latvian parliamentary election as a Latvia's First Party/Latvian Way candidate and was a potential candidate for foreign minister; however, he failed to get elected. Supporter of Crimea's annexation by Russia.

Jānis Jurkāns is divorced, and has two sons.
