= Socialist Party of Latvia =

Political party in Latvia

Socialist Party of Latvia Latvijas Sociālistiskā partija Социалистическая партия Латвии
- Abbreviation: LSP
- Leader: Vladimirs Frolovs
- Founder: Filips Stroganovs
- Founded: 15 January 1994; 32 years ago
- Registered: 14 March 1994; 32 years ago
- Preceded by: Communist Party of Latvia
- Headquarters: Citadeles iela 2, Riga
- Newspaper: Latvijas Socialists
- Ideology: Communism
- Political position: Far-left
- National affiliation: ForHRUL (2002–2005), Harmony Centre (2005–2010), Social Democratic Party "Harmony" (2010–2022)
- Regional affiliation: CPSU (2001)
- European affiliation: INITIATIVE
- European Parliament group: Non-Inscrits
- International affiliation: IMCWP
- Colours: Red
- Saeima: 0 / 100
- European Parliament: 0 / 8
- Riga City Council: 0 / 60

Website
- socparty.lv

The Socialist Party of Latvia (Latvian: Latvijas Sociālistiskā partija, abbr. LSP; Russian: Социалистическая партия Латвии) is a Marxist-Leninist party in Latvia. It is positioned on the far-left on the political spectrum.

It was formed in 1994 as a successor party to the Communist Party of Latvia, which was banned in 1991. According to the "programme of the party", the LSP was founded as an organization upholding socialist ideas after the 1991 events that the party describes as a "counter-revolutionary bourgeois-nationalist coup".

== Overview ==
The current CEOs of the party are Fridijs Bokišs, Ingars Burlaks and Vladimirs Frolovs. Between 1999 and 2015, the position was held by Alfrēds Rubiks, once mayor of Riga and later, leader of the unionist movement and head of the Latvian Communist Party (CPSU platform). He was imprisoned for six years in 1991, on charges of participating in a coup d'état against the Latvian authorities in August 1991. He is not one of the party's members in the Saeima (Latvian Parliament) since he is not allowed to contest elections. However, his sons Artūrs Rubiks and Raimonds Rubiks are members of the Saeima representing the Socialist Party, elected on a joint list with Harmony.

The LSP is more popular among the Russian-speaking population of Latvia. It places a high priority on issues important to ethnic Russians, such as language and citizenship laws. The party also believes that Latvian citizenship should be granted to all citizens of the former USSR living in Latvia in 1990. This would entail a major change in the current law, which only gives automatic citizenship to descendants of people who were citizens of the Republic of Latvia before it was occupied by the Soviet Union in 1940, and requires the Soviet citizens who moved to Latvia between 1940 and 1990 (mainly Russians), to go through a naturalization process.

In the election held on 5 October 2002, the party was part of the For Human Rights in United Latvia (Latvian: Par cilvēka tiesībām vienotā Latvijā) coalition that won 19.0% of the popular vote and 25 out of 100 seats, 5 of those seats went to Socialist Party. The party was a member of this alliance of predominantly Russian-speaking parties from 1998 to 2003.

Today, the party's platform is centered on anti-corruption and promoting an independent Latvia that is outside the European Union. In 2005, the LSP entered the Harmony Centre coalition, which won 17 seats in the 2006 election. Four of these 17 parliament members were representatives of the Socialist Party. In 2011, HC won 31 seats, with the Socialists receiving three seats (Artūrs Rubiks, Raimonds Rubiks and Igors Zujevs).

In 2014, Harmony and the Socialist Party participated separately in the European election of that year and the Harmony Centre alliance, although remaining registered, became inactive. The party did not contest the 2014 parliamentary election, however, all three of its outgoing MPs were placed on the SDPS list and were members of the "12th Saeima" (2014–2018). The same strategy was used in the 2018 election, but only Artūrs Rubiks was elected. The party gained a seat within the Harmony list for the 2020 Riga City Council election, with Artūrs Rubiks' older brother Raimonds Rubiks being elected. The party did not participate in the 2019 European elections.

In the 2025 Latvian municipal elections, both former allies have resorted to fielding separate electoral lists. In January 2026, the Harmony Centre alliance was reactivated, although the Latvian Socialist Party had left it due to "differing perceptions on the war in Ukraine and global events", as reported by Jānis Urbanovičs, the leader of Harmony.

== Election results ==
=== Legislative elections ===
Election	Party leader	Performance					Rank	Government
Election	Party leader	Votes	%	± pp	Seats	+/–	Rank	Government
1995	Filips Stroganovs	53,325	5.61	New	5 / 100	New	9th	Opposition
1998	Filips Stroganovs	135,700	14.20 (ForHRUL-TSP (Note: For Human Rights in United Latvia list won 16 seats – 6 went to TSP – 5 to Equal Rights – 4 to LSP – 1 to KP))	▲8.59	4 / 100	▼1	▲4th	Opposition
2002	Alfrēds Rubiks	189,088	19.09 (ForHRUL (Note: For Human Rights in United Latvia list won 25 seats – 12 went to TSP – 8 to Equal Rights – 5 to LSP))	▲4.89	5 / 100	▲1	▲2nd	Opposition
2006	Alfrēds Rubiks	130,887	14.52 (Harmony Centre (Note: Harmony Centre list won 17 seats – 11 went to TSP – 4 to LSP – 2 to JC – 1 to DPP))	▼4.57	4 / 100	▼1	▼4th	Opposition
2010	Alfrēds Rubiks	251,400	26.61 (Harmony Centre (Note: Harmony Centre list won 29 seats – 24 went to SDPS – 4 went to SPL – 1 to DPP))	▲12.09	4 / 100	0	2nd	Opposition
2011	Alfrēds Rubiks	259,930	28.62 (Harmony Centre (Note: Harmony Centre list won 31 seats – 28 went to SDPS – 3 went to the SPL))	▲2.01	3 / 100	▼1	▲1st	Opposition
2014	Alfrēds Rubiks	209,887	23.15 (Saskaņa (Note: SDPS list won 24 seats – 21 went to SDPS – 2 went to the SPL – 1 went to the GKR))	▼5.47	2 / 100	▼1	1st	Opposition
2018	Vladimirs Frolovs	167,117	19.92 (Saskaņa (Note: SDPS list won 23 seats – 21 went to SDPS – 1 went to the SPL – 1 went to the GKR))	▼3.23	1 / 100	▼1	1st	Opposition
2022	Vladimirs Frolovs	43,943	4.86 (Saskaņa (Note: SDPS list won 0 seats))	▼15.06	0 / 100	▼1	▼9th	Opposition

=== European Parliament elections ===
Election	Party leader	Performance					Rank	EP Group
Election	Party leader	Votes	%	± pp	Seats	+/–	Rank	EP Group
2004	Alfrēds Rubiks	9,480	1.66	New	0 / 8	New	12th	–
2009	Alfrēds Rubiks	154,894	19.93 (Harmony Centre (Note: Harmony Centre list won 2 seats – 1 went to TSP – 1 to LSP))	▲18.27	1 / 8	▲1	▲2nd	GUE-NGL
2014	Alfrēds Rubiks	57,863	13.14 (Saskaņa (Note: SDPS list won 1 seat – 1 went to SDPS))	▼6.79	0 / 8	▼1	▼3rd	–
2019	Vladimirs Frolovs	57,863	17.56 (Saskaņa (Note: SDPS list won 2 seats – 1 went to SDPS – 1 went to the GKR))	▲4.42	0 / 8	Steady	▲2nd	–
2024	Vladimirs Frolovs	37,096	7.21 (Saskaņa)	▼10.35	0 / 8	Steady	▼6th	–
