= Corruption Prevention and Combating Bureau =

Latvian law enforcement agency

KNAB logo

Corruption Prevention and Combating Bureau (KNAB; Latvian: Korupcijas novēršanas un apkarošanas birojs) is a specialised anti-corruption authority of Latvia. Its aim is to fight corruption in Latvia in a coordinated and comprehensive way through prevention, investigation and education. KNAB was established October 2002 and has been fully operational since February 2003.

KNAB is an independent public administration institution under the supervision of the Cabinet of Ministers. The supervision is executed by the Prime Minister. It is limited to the control of lawfulness of decisions. KNAB is also a pre-trial investigatory body and has traditional police powers.

KNAB represents Latvia at the GRECO.

The current director of KNAB is Jēkabs Straume (appointed on June 15, 2017). The deputy director on corruption combating matters is Jānis Roze.

== All executives ==
- Guntis Rutkis 2002–2003
- Rūdolfs Kalniņš (acting) 2003
- Alvis Vilks (acting) 2003
- Juta Strīķe (acting) 2003–2004
- Aleksejs Loskutovs 2004–2008
- Normunds Vilnītis 2009–2011
- Juta Strīķe (acting) 2011
- Jaroslavs Streļčenoks 2011–2016 17.November
- Ilze Jurča (acting) 2016–2017
- Jēkabs Straume 2017–present

== Former executives ==
- Guntis Rutkis, director, 2002–2003
- Aleksejs Loskutovs, director, 2003–June 29, 2008
- Normunds Vilnitis, director, 2009–March 12, 2011 June 16
- Jaroslavs Streļčenoks, director, 2011–November 17., 2016–November 17.
