= Social Democratic Party "Harmony" =

Political party in Latvia

Social Democratic Party "Harmony" Sociāldemokrātiskā Partija "Saskaņa" Социал-демократическая партия «Согласие»
- Abbreviation: S
- Chairman: Jānis Urbanovičs
- Vice chairman: Konstantīns Čekušins
- Founders: Sergejs Dolgopolovs; Nils Ušakovs; Jānis Urbanovičs
- Founded: 21 November 2009; 17 years ago
- Registered: 10 February 2010; 16 years ago
- Dissolved: 21 November 2026; 0 days ago (Note: The extraordinary party congress has voted to begin the dissolution process on 21 November 2026.)
- Merger of: Daugavpils City Party; National Harmony Party; New Centre; Social Democratic Party
- Headquarters: Stabu iela 19-25, Riga
- Youth wing: Restart.lv
- Membership (2017): 3,653
- Ideology: Social democracy Russian minority politics
- Political position: Centre-left to left-wing
- National affiliation: Harmony Centre (2009–2014, since 2026)
- European affiliation: Party of European Socialists
- European Parliament group: Progressive Alliance of Socialists and Democrats
- International affiliation: Progressive Alliance
- Colours: Red
- Saeima: 0 / 100
- European Parliament: 1 / 9
- Riga City Council: 0 / 60
- Mayors: 1 / 43

Website
- saskana.eu

The Social Democratic Party "Harmony" (Latvian: Sociāldemokrātiskā partija "Saskaņa"; Russian: Социал-демократическая партия «Согласие», romanized: Sotsial-demokraticheskaya partiya «Soglasiye», S), (Note: The party officially translates its name as Social Democratic Party "Concord".) also commonly referred to as Harmony (Saskaņa), was a social-democratic political party in Latvia. It was the largest political party in the Saeima, representing the Russian minority of Latvia, before losing all of its parliamentary seats in the 2022 Latvian parliamentary election. It is currently led by Jānis Urbanovičs and is part of the Harmony Center party alliance.

On 21 November 2026, following the disappointing result in the 2026 parliamentary election, two-thirds of the party's congress voted to begin the dissolution process.

== History ==
It was founded in 2010 as the merger of the National Harmony Party (TSP) with New Centre (JC) and the Social Democratic Party (SDP), a breakaway from the Latvian Social Democratic Workers' Party (LSDSP). At the time, all three parties were part of the Harmony Centre coalition, which was also made up of the Socialist Party of Latvia. The Daugavpils City Party merged into Harmony in 2011. From 2014 to 2026, the Harmony Center alliance was inactive.

The former chairman of the party, Nils Ušakovs served as the Mayor of Riga from 2009 to 2019, and was Harmony's candidate for the office of Prime Minister of Latvia in 2014. Internationally, "Harmony" is a member of the Progressive Alliance and the Party of European Socialists. After the 2014 European Parliament election in Latvia, its sole MEP, Andrejs Mamikins, sat in the Progressive Alliance of Socialists and Democrats (S&D) group in the European Parliament. In 2018, after disagreements with Ušakovs, he defected to the Latvian Russian Union, and the party lost its representation in the European Parliament until the 2019 European Parliament election in Latvia, when Ušakovs and his ally, former Vice Mayor of Riga Andris Ameriks (a member of Honor to serve Riga) were elected. In the 2018 Latvian parliamentary election, Harmony won 23 seats, but in the subsequent 2022 Latvian parliamentary election was unable to secure any parliamentary seats, polling slightly less than the 5% threshold (of all votes, including invalid) with 4.9% of the vote. Some former Harmony supporters appeared to support a new Eurosceptic populist party, For Stability!, that split from Harmony in 2021. In 2023, around 120 Harmony members from Rēzekne, Rēzekne Municipality, and Ludza Municipality left after Rēzekne Mayor Aleksandrs Bartaševičs was expelled from the paarty.

Harmony is positioned on the centre-left to left-wing on the political spectrum, although it has taken conservative rhetoric regarding social issues, while its parliamentary membership is not uniformly socially conservative. It previously had ties with United Russia until 2017, when Harmony joined the Party of European Socialists. It is also a member of the Progressive Alliance.

== Election results ==
=== Legislative elections ===
Election	Party leader	Performance					Rank	Government
Election	Party leader	Votes	%	± pp	Seats	+/–	Rank	Government
2010 (Note: Harmony Centre list won 29 seats; 4 went to SPL and 1 to DCP)	Jānis Urbanovičs	251,400	26.61	New	24 / 100	New	2nd	Opposition
2011 (Note: Harmony Centre list won 31 seats; 3 went to the SPL)	Nils Ušakovs	259,930	28.62	▲2.01	28 / 100	▲4	▲1st	Opposition
2014	Nils Ušakovs	209,887	23.15	▼5.47	24 / 100	▼4	1st	Opposition
2018	Vjačeslavs Dombrovskis	167,117	19.92	▼3.23	23 / 100	▼1	1st	Opposition
2022	Ivars Zariņš	43,943	4.86	▼15.06	0 / 100	▼23	▼9th	Extra-parliamentary
2026 (Note: Harmony Centre list won 0 seats)	Jānis Urbanovičs	6,598	0.82	▼4.04	0 / 100	0	▼13th	Extra-parliamentary

=== European Parliament elections ===
Election	List leader	Votes	%	Seats	+/–	EP Group
2014	Boris Tsilevitch	57,863	13.14 (#3)	1 / 8	New	S&D
2019	Nils Ušakovs	82,604	17.56 (#2)	2 / 8	▲1	S&D
2024	Nils Ušakovs	37,096	7.21 (#6)	1 / 9	0	S&D
