= Sergey Dolgopolov =

Latvian Russian politician

Sergejs Dolgopolovs Sergey Dolgopolov
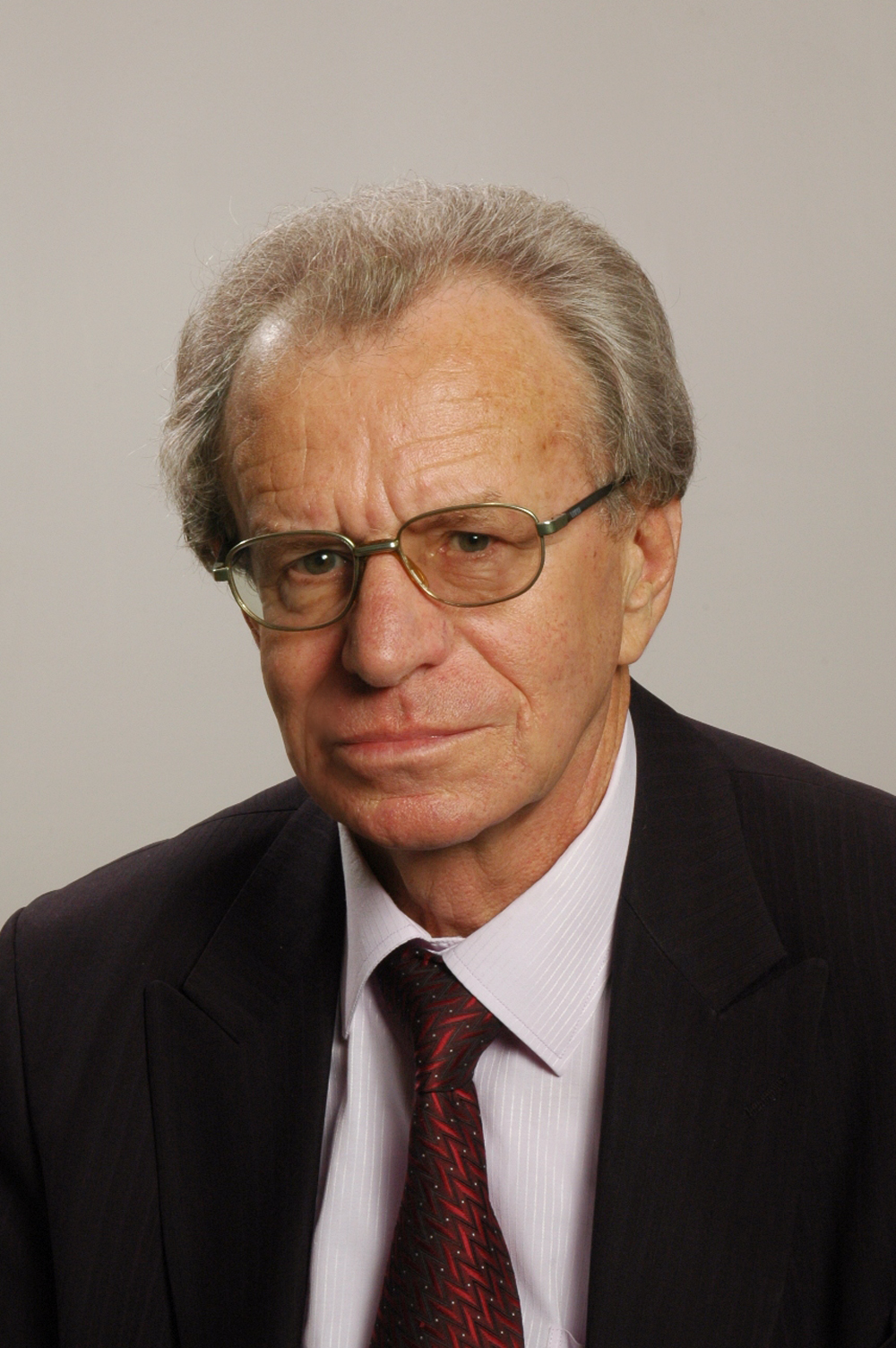

Deputy of the Saeima
- Incumbent
- Assumed office 2006

Personal details
- Born: 3 September 1941 (age 85) Rīga, Reichskomissariat Ostland
- Party: Harmony (until 2023)
- Education: Riga Technical University
- Profession: Engineer

Sergejs Dolgopolovs (Russian: Сергей Леонидович Долгополов; born 3 September 1941) is a Latvian politician. He was a member of Harmony, former deputy mayor of Riga (2001–2005) and a deputy of the 9th, 10th, 11th, 12th and 13th Saeima (2006-present). In 2015 he was the Harmony's candidate in the election for President of Latvia.

In early 2015, Harmony nominated S. Dolgopolov as its candidate in the presidential election, but he was not elected. In autumn 2018, he was elected to the 13th Saeima. He also stood in the 2022 parliamentary election, but Harmony's list failed to pass the 5% threshold. He subsequently left Harmony.

In the 2024 European Parliament election, S. Dolgopolov stood as a candidate on the Sovereign Power party list but was not elected. In the 2025 Riga City Council election, he was elected as a municipal councillor on the Latvia First party list.
