= National Harmony Party =

Former Latvian political party

National Harmony Party Tautas Saskaņas partija Партия народного согласия
- Abbreviation: TSP (Latvian); ПНС (Russian)
- Leader: Jānis Urbanovičs
- Founder: Jānis Jurkāns
- Founded: 4 March 1994
- Dissolved: 10 February 2010
- Split from: Popular Front of Latvia
- Preceded by: Harmony for Latvia — Revival of the National Economy
- Merged into: Social Democratic Party "Harmony"
- Headquarters: Riga
- Ideology: Social democracy Russian minority politics Russophilia
- Political position: Left-wing
- National affiliation: Harmony Centre (2005-2010)
- European Parliament group: Progressive Alliance of Socialists and Democrats (2009-2010)
- Colours: Maroon; White
- Seats in the 9th Saeima: 11 / 100
- Seats in the 7th European Parliament: 1 / 8

Website
- tsp.lv

The National Harmony Party (Latvian: Tautas Saskaņas partija, TSP. Russian: Партия народного согласия) was a political party in Latvia.

The party identified with social democracy. It supported further liberalisation of Latvian nationality law by granting citizenship to non-citizens who had lived in Latvia for at least 10 years as opposed to the existing law that only allowed Soviet-era migrants to apply for citizenship through a process of naturalization. It also supported expanding education in minority languages, particularly Russian.

== History ==
TSP originates from the Popular Front of Latvia, the Latvian independence movement of the late 1980s and early 1990s. Its leader, Jānis Jurkāns, was the first Minister of Foreign Affairs of newly re-independent Latvia, from 1990 to 1992 when he had to leave the government for his stance on relations with Russia. Together with other activists, Jurkāns founded the Harmony for Latvia — Revival of the National Economy (Saskaņa Latvijai - Atdzimšana Tautsaimniecībai) alliance, which won 13 seats in the 1993 parliamentary election. The alliance split in 1994, with the free-market liberal wing becoming the Political Union of Economists and the social-democratic wing becoming the TSP. Jurkāns served as leader from then until 2005, when he resigned. The party's last chairman was Jānis Urbanovičs.

From its foundation, the party was popular with ethnic Russian voters for its views on the citizenship issue and official languages. Unlike other parties popular with Russians, it also had a considerable number of ethnic Latvians in its leadership and was an attempt to bridge the ethnic divide in Latvian politics. The TSP won 6 seats at the 1995 parliamentary election. In 1998, it allied with two other predominantly Russian parties, the Latvian Socialist Party and Equal Rights, both of which held more radical pro-Russian positions. This step seriously damaged the reputation of the TSP amongst ethnic Latvians. The three parties founded the For Human Rights in United Latvia alliance. At the 2002 parliamentary election, the alliance won 18.9% at the popular vote and 25 seats. In 2003, the TSP left the alliance. It won no seats at the 2004 European Parliament election, and in 2005 lost its representation on Riga City Council.

In 2005, the party created the electoral alliance Harmony Centre, containing, among other parties, the Latvian Socialist Party, one of its former partners in For Human Rights in United Latvia. Harmony Centre won 17 seats in the 2006 parliamentary election. The TSP formed the basis of the Harmony party which was created on 10 February 2010.

== Election results ==
=== Legislative elections ===
Election	Party leader	Performance					Rank	Government
Election	Party leader	Votes	%	± pp	Seats	+/–	Rank	Government
1993	Jānis Jurkāns	134,289	12.01	New	13 / 100	New	3rd	Opposition
1995	Jānis Jurkāns	53,041	5.58	▼6.43	6 / 100	▼7	▼8th	Opposition
1998	Jānis Jurkāns	135,700	14.20	▲8.62	16 / 100	▲10	▲4th	Opposition
2002	Jānis Jurkāns	189,088	19.09 (ForHRUL (Note: For Human Rights in United Latvia list won 25 seats - 12 went to TSP - 8 to Equal Rights - 5 to LSP))	▲4.89	12 / 100	▼4	▲2nd	Opposition
2006	Jānis Urbanovičs	130,887	14.52 (Harmony Centre (Note: Harmony Centre list won 17 seats - 11 went to TSP - 4 to LSP - 2 to JC - 1 to DPP))	▼4.57	11 / 100	▼1	▼4th	Opposition

=== European Parliament elections ===
Election	Party leader	Performance					Rank
Election	Party leader	Votes	%	± pp	Seats	+/–	Rank
2004	Jānis Jurkāns	27,506	4.81	New	0 / 8	New	6th
2009	Aleksandrs Mirskis	154,894	19.93	▲15.12	1 / 8	▲2	▲2nd (Note: Harmony Centre list won 2 seats - 1 went to TSP - 1 to LSP)
