= Equal Rights (Latvia) =

Defunct political party in Latvia

Equal Rights Līdztiesība Равноправие
- Leader: Tatjana Ždanoka
- Chairman: Vladimirs Buzajevs
- Founders: Tatjana Ždanoka; Sergejs Dīmanis
- Founded: 30 April 1993
- Registered: 11 December 1996
- Dissolved: 19 October 2007
- Preceded by: Interfront
- Merged into: For Human Rights in United Latvia
- Ideology: Russian minority politics Russophilia; Euroscepticism
- Political position: Left-wing
- National affiliation: ForHRUL (since 1998)
- Colours: Red

Website
- pctvl.lv

Equal Rights (ER; Latvian: Līdztiesība, Russian: Равноправие) was a political party in Latvia, mainly supported by the Russian minority.

ER was founded on the basis of the "Equal Rights" faction of the Supreme Soviet as a NGO in 1993. The Equal Rights faction (Russian: Равноправие) had been founded in April, 1990, after the 1990 Latvian parliamentary election.

The NGO transformed into a party in 1996. Its leaders were MPs Tatjana Ždanoka and Sergejs Dīmanis. The organization participated in the 1994 municipal election and the 1995 legislative election within the Socialist Party of Latvia list.

In 1998, ER joined with two other predominantly Russian parties, the Latvian Socialist Party and the National Harmony Party to found the alliance For Human Rights in United Latvia (Latvian: Par Cilvēka Tiesībām Vienotā Latvijā; ForHRUL). The alliance split in 2003, with the National Harmony Party and the Socialist Party abandoning the coalition, leaving the newly founded rump Free Choice in People's Europe (made up of dissident Socialist Party and Harmony Party members, like Yakov Pliner, who opposed the decision to quit the alliance) in the ForHRUL coalition.

From 2001 ER's leader was Tatjana Ždanoka and its chairman was Vladimir Buzayev.

In 2007, the 11th Congress of the party decided to merge it with Free Choice in People's Europe, transforming their block ForHRUL into a unified party. The party failed to win any seats in the 2010 legislative election.
