= Deputies of the 9th Saeima =

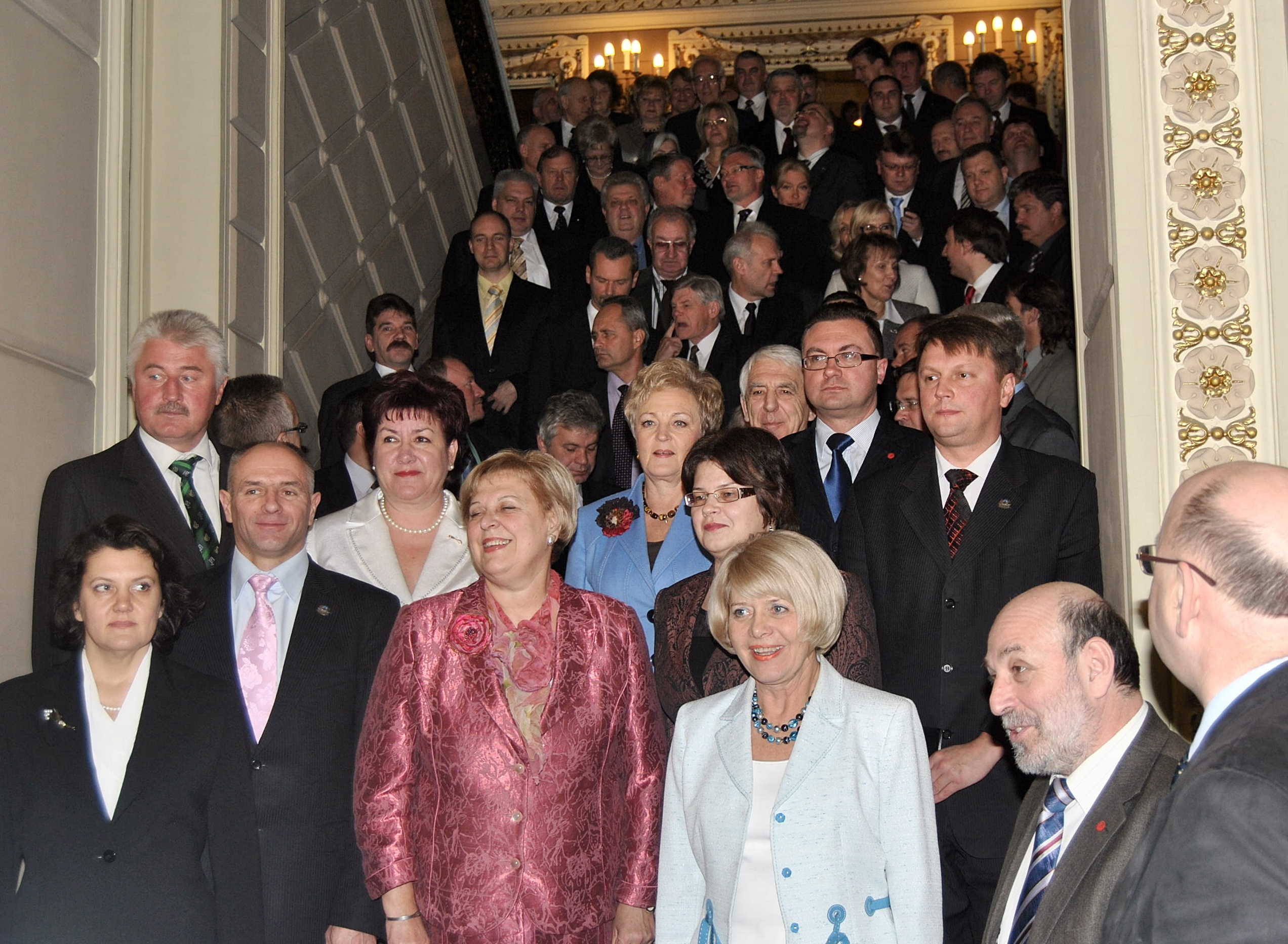
Deputies of the 9th Saeima group picture

The Deputies of the 9th Saeima are the 100 deputies or members of the parliament of Latvia, the Saeima. Ninety-nine of those elected to 9th Saeima began their term on 7 November 2006, and ended their term on 2 November 2010. However in total including deputies with mandates and others, the 9th Saeima had 116 working members.

== Members of the 9th Saeima ==
The list has 116 people, all in alphabetical order of the deputies of the Saeima. Names in italics did not attend a full term of the Saeima.

Deputy	Party	Term	Notes
Valērijs Agešins	Harmony Centre	07.11.2006. -	
Vitālijs Aizbalts	Latvia's First Party/Latvian Way	07.11.2006. -	
Uldis Augulis	Union of Greens and Farmers	16.11.2006. - 20.12.2007.	
Dzintars Ābiķis	People's Party	07.11.2006. -	
Solvita Āboltiņa	New Era Party	07.11.2006. -	
Māris Ārbergs	People's Party	07.11.2006. -	
Aija Barča	People's Party	07.11.2006. -	
Ainars Baštiks	Latvia's First Party/Latvian Way	07.11.2006. - 16.11.2006.	
Silva Bendrāte	New Era Party	07.11.2006. -	
Andris Bērziņš	Latvia's First Party/Latvian Way	07.11.2006. -	
Andris Bērziņš	Union of Greens and Farmers	07.11.2006. -	
Gundars Bērziņš	People's Party	07.11.2006. - 16.11.2006.	
Guntis Blumbergs	Union of Greens and Farmers	07.11.2006. -	
Juris Boldāns	without fraction	16.11.2006. - 28.10.2008.	
Vilnis-Edvīns Bresis	Union of Greens and Farmers	16.11.2006. -	
Uldis Briedis	People's Party	07.11.2006. -	
Augusts Brigmanis	Union of Greens and Farmers	07.11.2006. -	
Valery Bukhvalov	For Human Rights in United Latvia	07.11.2006. -	
Vladimir Buzayev	For Human Rights in United Latvia	07.11.2006. -	
Boris Tsilevitch	Harmony Centre	07.11.2006. -	
Ingrīda Circene	New Era Party	07.11.2006. -	
Ilma Čepāne	New Era Party; outside fraction; PS	07.11.2006. -	
Juris Dalbiņš	People's Party	07.11.2006. -	
Gundars Daudze	Union of Greens and Farmers	07.11.2006. -	President
Helēna Demakova	People's Party	07.11.2006. - 16.11.2006.	
Oļegs Deņisovs	Harmony Centre	07.11.2006. -	
Juris Dobelis	For Fatherland and Freedom/LNNK	07.11.2006. -	
Sergey Dolgopolov	Harmony Centre	07.11.2006. -	
Ina Druviete	New Era Party; outside fraction; PS	07.11.2006. -	
Jānis Dukšinskis	Latvia's First Party/Latvian Way	07.11.2006. -	
Jānis Eglītis	People's Party	07.11.2006. -	
Indulis Emsis	Union of Greens and Farmers	07.11.2006. - 21.09.2007.	Vice President
Guntis Jānis Eniņš	Union of Greens and Farmers	16.11.2006. - 12.02.2009.	
Inta Feldmane	Latvia's First Party/Latvian Way	16.11.2006. -	
Sergejs Fjodorovs	Harmony Centre	07.11.2006. -	
Ivars Godmanis	Latvia's First Party/Latvian Way	07.11.2006. - 16.11.2006.	
Aleksandrs Golubovs	Harmony Centre	07.11.2006. - 19.05.2010	died in office
Uldis-Ivars Grava	New Era Party	07.11.2006. -	
Māris Grīnblats	For Fatherland and Freedom/LNNK	07.11.2006. -	
Valdis Ģīlis	People's Party	23.11.2006. -	
Pēteris Hanka	Union of Greens and Farmers	07.11.2006. -	
Dzintars Jaundžeikars	Latvia's First Party/Latvian Way	16.11.2006. -	
Nikolai Kabanov	For Human Rights in United Latvia; outside fraction; SC	07.11.2006. -	
Sandra Kalniete	New Era Party; outside fraction; PS	07.11.2006. -	
Imants Kalniņš	For Fatherland and Freedom/LNNK	07.11.2006. -	
Aigars Kalvītis	People's Party	07.11.2006. - 16.11.2006.	
Artis Kampars	New Era Party	07.11.2006. -	
Arturs Krišjānis Kariņš	New Era Party	07.11.2006. -	
Oskars Kastēns	Latvia's First Party/Latvian Way	07.11.2006. - 16.11.2006., 15.01.2009.-	
Andis Kāposts	Union of Greens and Farmers	16.11.2006. -	
Jānis Klaužs	People's Party	07.11.2006. -	
Andrejs Klementjevs	Harmony Centre	07.11.2006. -	sekretāra biedrs
Ivans Klementjevs	Harmony Centre	07.11.2006.	
Māris Krastiņš	People's Party	16.11.2006. - 01.11.2007.	
Vents Armands Krauklis	People's Party	07.11.2006. -	
Māris Kučinskis	People's Party	07.11.2006. -	
Sarmīte Ķikuste	New Era Party	07.11.2006. -	
Gunārs Laicāns	For Fatherland and Freedom/LNNK; outside fraction; PS	07.11.2006. -	
Jānis Lagzdiņš	People's Party	07.11.2006. -	
Ainars Latkovskis	New Era Party	07.11.2006. -	
Visvaldis Lācis	Union of Greens and Farmers; outside fraction	07.11.2006. - 20.10.2007., 20.10.2007. —	
Kārlis Leiškalns	People's Party	16.11.2006. -	
Ingmārs Līdaka	Union of Greens and Farmers	07.11.2006. -	
Leons Līdums	People's Party	07.11.2006. -	
Anatolijs Mackevičs	Latvia's First Party/Latvian Way	07.11.2006. -	
Sergey Mirsky	Harmony Centre	07.11.2006. -	
Miroslav Mitrofanov	For Human Rights in United Latvia	07.11.2006. -	
Vineta Muižniece	People's Party	07.11.2006. -	priekšsēdētāja vietniece
Linda Mūrniece	New Era Party	07.11.2006. -	
Vitālijs Orlovs	Harmony Centre	07.11.2006. -	
Leopolds Ozoliņš	Union of Greens and Farmers	07.11.2006. -	
Artis Pabriks	People's Party; outside fraction	07.11.2006. - 16.11.2006., 01.11.2007.—	
Vaira Paegle	People's Party	16.11.2006. -	
Raimonds Pauls	People's Party	07.11.2006. -	
Karina Pētersone	Latvia's First Party/Latvian Way	07.11.2006. -	priekšsēdētāja vietniece
Yakov Pliner	For Human Rights in United Latvia	07.11.2006. -	
Jānis Porietis	People's Party	16.11.2006. -	
Pauls Putniņš	Union of Greens and Farmers	07.11.2006. -	
Dzintars Rasnačs	For Fatherland and Freedom/LNNK	07.11.2006. -	sekretārs
Jānis Reirs	New Era Party	07.11.2006. -	
Einars Repše	New Era Party	07.11.2006. -	
Ivans Ribakovs	Harmony Centre	07.11.2006. -	
Baiba Rivža	Union of Greens and Farmers	07.11.2006. - 16.11.2006.	
Inguna Rībena	New Era Party	07.11.2006. -	
Mārtiņš Roze	Union of Greens and Farmers	07.11.2006. - 16.11.2006., 12.02.2009.-	
Ziedonis Rubezis	People's Party	16.11.2006. - 25.10.2007.	
Artūrs Rubiks	Harmony Centre	07.11.2006. -	
Anta Rugāte	People's Party	07.11.2006. -	
Mareks Segliņš	People's Party	07.11.2006. -	
Anna Seile	For Fatherland and Freedom/LNNK; outside fraction; PS	07.11.2006. -	
Ligita Silaraupa	Union of Greens and Farmers	16.11.2006. - 15.11.2007.	
Atis Slakteris	People's Party	07.11.2006. - 16.11.2006.	
Juris Sokolovskis	For Human Rights in United Latvia	07.11.2006. -	
Oskars Spurdziņš	People's Party	07.11.2006. - 23.11.2006.	
Dagnija Staķe	Union of Greens and Farmers	07.11.2006. - 16.11.2006., 15.11.2007. -	
Vjačeslavs Stepaņenko	Latvia's First Party/Latvian Way	16.11.2006. -	
Jānis Strazdiņš	Union of Greens and Farmers	07.11.2006. -	
Kārlis Šadurskis	New Era Party; outside fraction; PS	07.11.2006. -	
Viktors Ščerbatihs	Union of Greens and Farmers	07.11.2006. -	
Staņislavs Šķesters	Union of Greens and Farmers	07.11.2006. -	
Inese Šlesere	Latvia's First Party/Latvian Way	07.11.2006. - 16.11.2006.	
Ainārs Šlesers	Latvia's First Party/Latvian Way	07.11.2006. - 16.11.2006., 05.03.2009. -	
Jānis Šmits	Latvia's First Party/Latvian Way	16.11.2006. - 15.01.2009.	
Aigars Štokenbergs	People's Party; outside fraction	07.11.2006. - 16.11.2006.; 25.10.2007. —	
Pēteris Tabūns	For Fatherland and Freedom/LNNK	07.11.2006. -	
Dainis Turlais	Latvia's First Party/Latvian Way	16.11.2006. - 05.03.2009.	
Jānis Tutins	Harmony Centre	07.11.2006. -	
Gunārs Upenieks	Union of Greens and Farmers	07.11.2006. -	
Jānis Urbanovičs	Harmony Centre	07.11.2006. -	
Nils Ušakovs	Harmony Centre	07.11.2006. -	
Imants Valers	People's Party	07.11.2006. -	
Raimonds Vējonis	Union of Greens and Farmers	07.11.2006. - 16.11.2006.	
Aleksejs Vidavskis	Harmony Centre	07.11.2006. -	
Dzintars Zaķis	New Era Party	07.11.2006. -	
Ausma Ziedone-Kantāne	New Era Party	07.11.2006. -	
Ērika Zommere	People's Party	16.11.2006. -	
