= Ezergailis =

Family name

Origin
- Origin: Latvian
- Meaning: "bittern"

Ezergailis (feminine: Ezergaile) is a Latvian surname, derived from the Latvian word for "bittern". Individuals with the surname include:

- Andrew Ezergailis (1930–2022), historian
- Inta Ezergailis (1932–2005), historian and author
