= INTA =

Inta or INTA may refer to:

Abbreviations

- European Parliament Committee on International Trade, a European Parliament committee
- Instituto Nacional de Técnica Aeroespacial, Spanish space agency
- National Agricultural Technology Institute (Instituto Nacional de Tecnología Agropecuaria), an institute in Argentina
- International New Thought Alliance, an umbrella organization of New Thought organizations
- International Trademark Association, a worldwide not-for-profit association

Places

- Inta, a town in the Komi Republic, Russia
- Inta Urban Okrug, a municipal formation which the town of republic significance of Inta in the Komi Republic, Russia is incorporated as
- Inta Airport, an airport in the Komi Republic, Russia

Other

- Inta (given name), feminine Latvian first name
- INTA-255 and INTA-300, Spanish sounding rockets
- Inta Juice, a juice and smoothie franchise financially backed by Randy Moss, American football player
- N-2′-Indolylnaltrexamine, an experimental opioid drug
