= Jēkabpils casino robbery =

2011 crime in Latvia

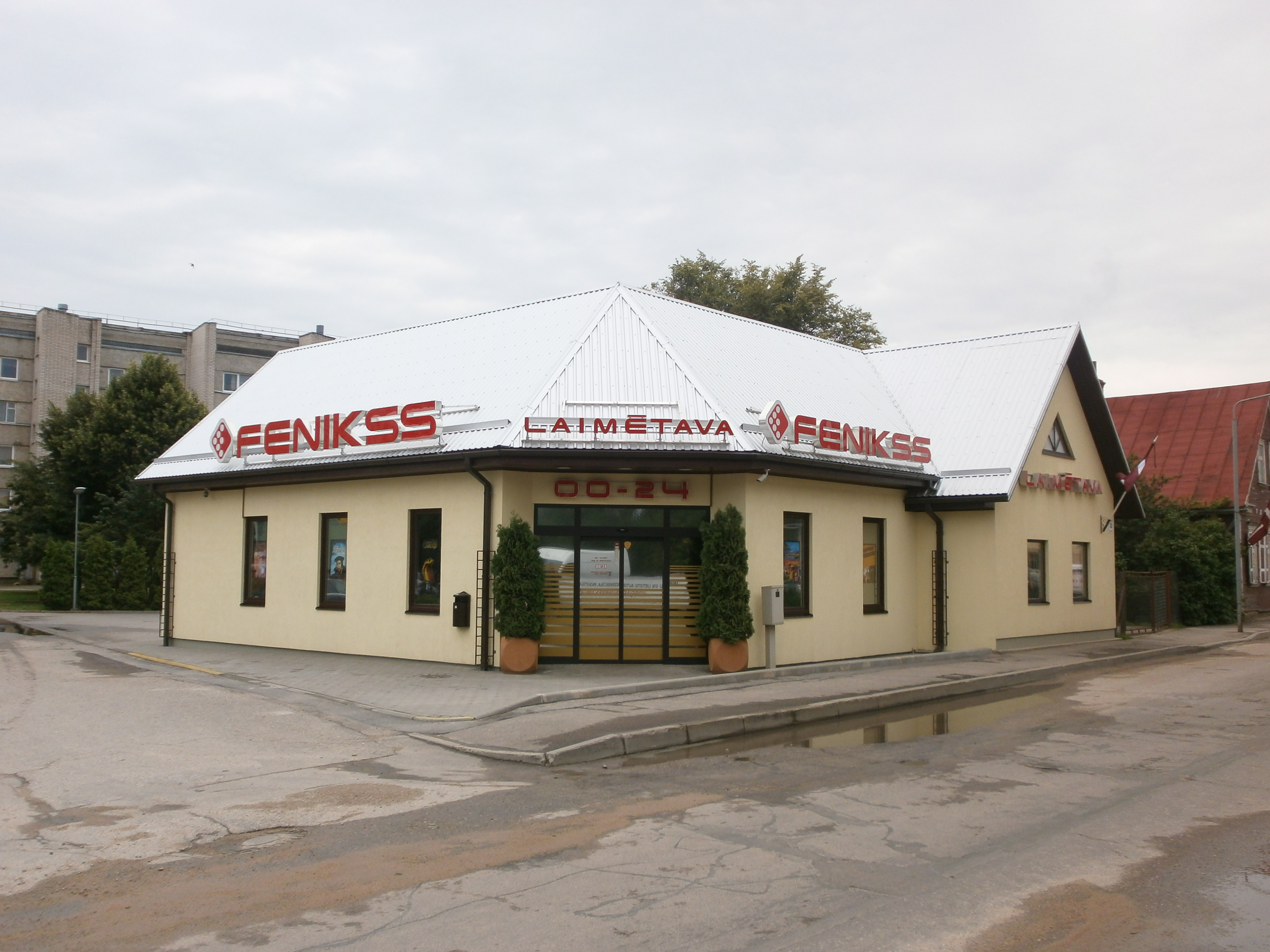
The robbed "Fēnikss" casino

The Jēkabpils casino robbery took place on the morning of 25 January 2011, when five individuals, four of whom were Latvian State Police officers (two from the special unit “Alfa” and two from the Tukums police station), robbed the casino “Fēnikss” in the city of Jēkabpils and tried to flee the scene, but were caught after entering a dead-end road. During the robbery and subsequent escape, security guards and several police officers were injured, while police officer Andris Znotiņš was shot dead. The robbers tried to escape in a Chrysler Voyager; the stolen money was found in it.

After the shooting, Interior Minister Linda Mūrniece temporarily suspended the head of the Riga Regional Directorate of the State Police, Ints Ķuzis, the commander of the special unit “Alfa”, Andris Zausas, and two other senior managers of “Alfa”. The United Police Officers' Trade Union demanded the resignation of Minister Mūrniece. On the day of the funeral of the murdered policeman Andris Znotiņš in Jēkabpils, mourning was declared, his family received an allowance of 50,000 lats and he was awarded the Order of Viesturs.
