= Ziedonis Čevers =

Latvian politician (1960–2025)

Minister of the Interior
- In office 7 August 1997 – 9 April 1998
- Preceded by: Dainis Turlais
- Succeeded by: Andrejs Krastiņš
- In office 20 November 1991 – 3 August 1993
- Preceded by: Aloizs Vaznis
- Succeeded by: Ģirts Valdis Kristovskis

Personal details
- Born: 29 January 1960 Latvian SSR, USSR
- Died: 6 October 2025 (aged 65)
- Party: Saimnieks (1994–1999)
- Education: Latvian Academy of Sport Education
- Occupation: Judo coach

Ziedonis Čevers (29 January 1960 – 6 October 2025) was a Latvian politician. A member of Saimnieks, he served as Minister of the Interior from 1991 to 1993 and again from 1997 to 1998.

Čevers died on 6 October 2025, at the age of 65.
