= Inta (given name) =

- Gender: Female
- Name day: 3 June

Origin
- Origin: Feminine form of Ints, which is short for Indriķis
- Region of origin: Latvia

Other names
- Related names: Ints, Indriķis, Henry

Inta is a feminine Latvian given name and may refer to:

- Inta Ezergailis (1932–2005), Latvian American literary critic and poet
- Inta Feldmane, (born 1959) Latvian politician
- Inta Kļimoviča (born 1951), athlete
- Inta Purviņa (born 1940), Latvian politician
- Inta Ruka (born 1958), Latvian photographer
