= Vaira =

Female given name

- Gender: Female
- Name day: 17 September

Origin
- Meaning: derived from either vairot (to multiply) or vairīties (to avoid)
- Region of origin: Latvia

Vaira is a feminine Latvian given name. Notable people with the name include:

- Vaira Paegle (born 1942), Latvian politician
- Vaira Vīķe-Freiberga (born 1937), sixth President of Latvia
