= Briedis =

Origin
- Origin: Latvian, Lithuanian
- Meaning: "deer" (Latvian) or "moose" (Lithuanian)

Briedis
- Lithuanian surname
- m.: Briedis
- f.: (unmarried): Briedytė
- f.: (married): Briedienė

Briedis (Old Latvian orthography: Breedis; Latvian feminine: Briede; Lithuanian feminine: Briedienė (married or widow) and Briedytė (unmarried)) is a Latvian and Lithuanian surname, either derived from the Latvian word for "deer" or Lithuanian word for "moose". Individuals with the surname include:

- Arnold Briedis (born 1955), former Australian rules footballer
- Frīdrihs Briedis (1888–1918), Latvian colonel and a Latvian Riflemen commander
- Leons Briedis (1949–2020), a Latvian poet, a novelist, an essayist, a literary critic and publisher, translator of prose and poetry
- Vytautas Briedis (1940–2019), a former Lithuanian rower
- Uldis Briedis (born 1942), a Latvian politician
- Mairis Briedis (born 1985), a Latvian professional boxer
