= Dzintars Jaundžeikars =

Latvian politician (1956–2022)

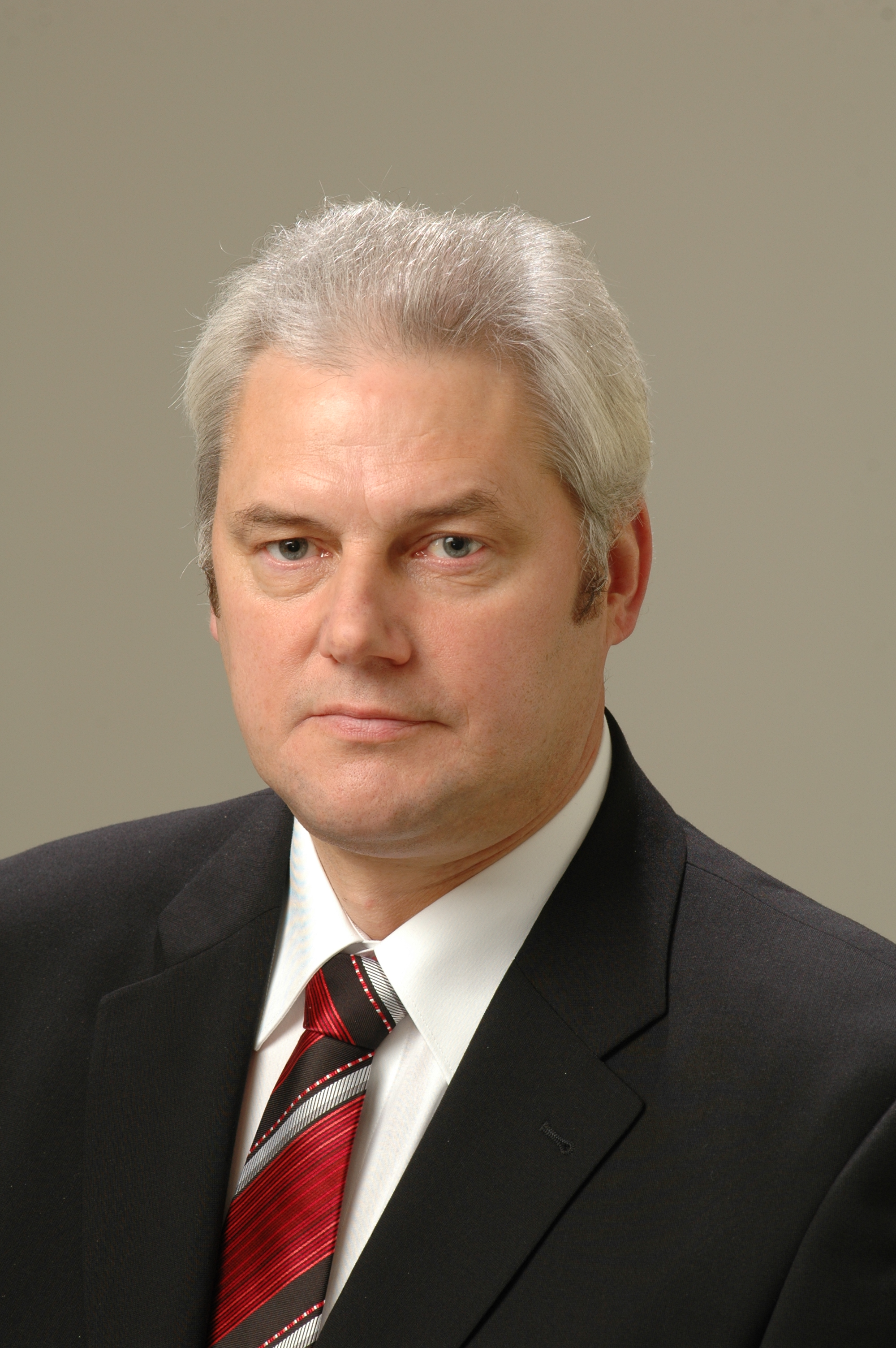

Minister of the Interior of Latvia
- In office 3 November 2005 – 7 November 2006
- Preceded by: Ēriks Jēkabsons
- Succeeded by: Ivars Godmanis

Deputy of Saeima
- In office 2002–2010

Personal details
- Born: 14 February 1956 Latvian SSR, Soviet Union
- Died: 16 March 2022 (aged 66)
- Party: Latvian National Independence Movement; Latvia's First Party (2002–2007); Latvia's First Party/Latvian Way (2007–2011)

Dzintars Jaundžeikars (14 February 1956 – 16 March 2022) was a Latvian politician. He was a member of the LPP/LC and a deputy of the 8th and 9th Saeima (Latvian Parliament). He began his last term in parliament on 16 November 2006, until he was voted out in 2010 Latvian parliamentary election. Jaundžeikars was also Minister of the Interior of Latvia from 3 November 2005 to 7 November 2006. Jaundžeikars died on 16 March 2022, at the age of 66, from COVID-19.
