= Rihards Kozlovskis =

Latvian politician and lawyer (born 1969)

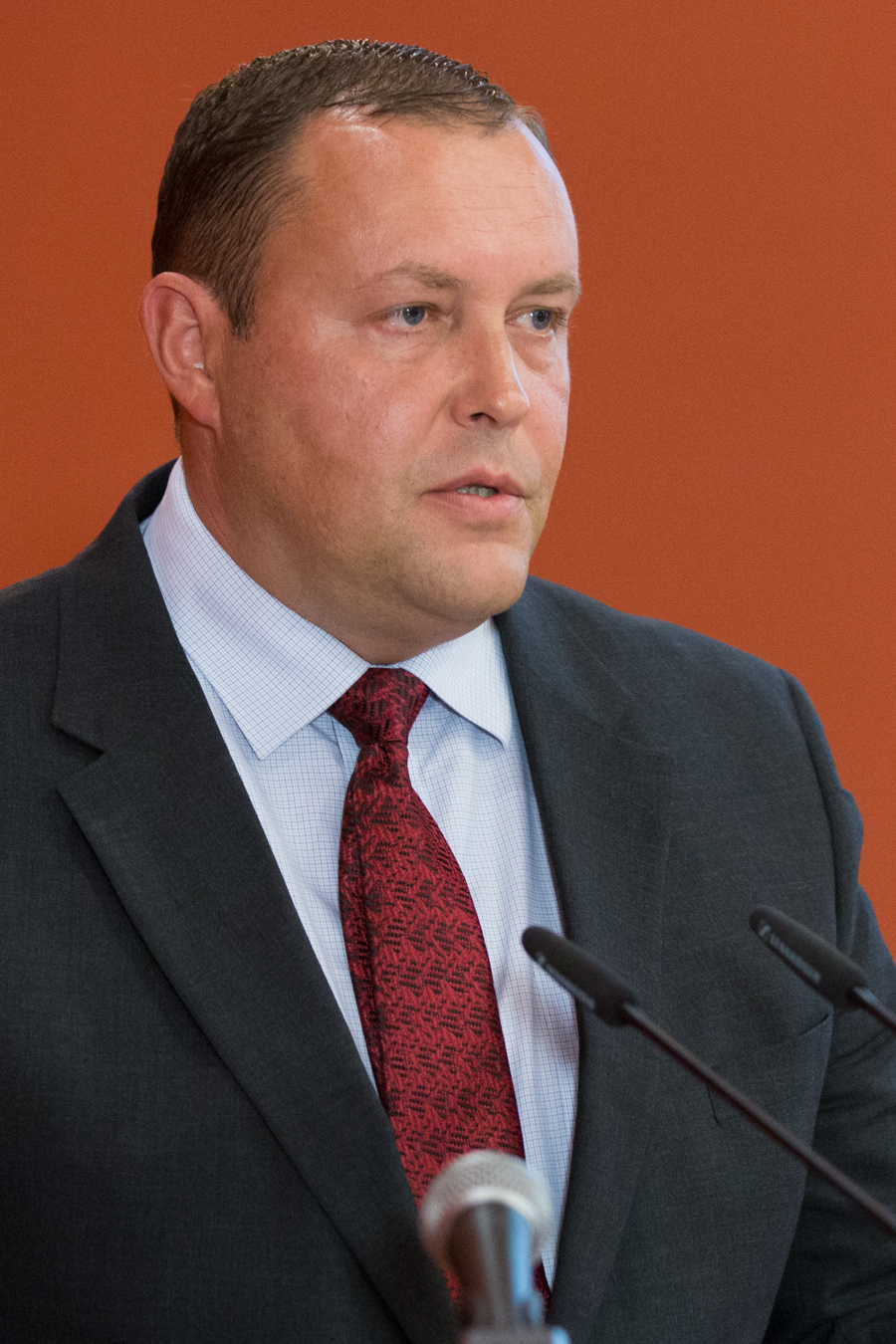
- Kozlovskis in 2015

Minister of Transport
- In office 28 May 2026 – 17 November 2026
- Prime Minister: Andris Kulbergs
- Preceded by: Atis Švinka
- Succeeded by: Krišs Lipšāns

Minister of the Interior
- In office 15 September 2023 – 28 May 2026
- Prime Minister: Evika Siliņa
- Preceded by: Māris Kučinskis
- Succeeded by: Jānis Dombrava
- In office 25 October 2011 – 23 January 2019
- Prime Minister: Valdis Dombrovskis; Laimdota Straujuma; Māris Kučinskis
- Preceded by: Linda Mūrniece
- Succeeded by: Sandis Ģirģens

Member of the Saeima
- Incumbent
- Assumed office 7 February 2019

Personal details
- Born: 26 May 1969 (age 57) Riga, Latvian SSR (now Latvia)
- Party: Reform Party (2011–2014); Unity (2014–present)
- Education: Latvian Academy of Sport Education; University of Latvia

Rihards Kozlovskis (born 26 May 1969) is a Latvian politician and lawyer. He has served as the Minister of the Transport of Latvia in 2026; he had previously served as Minister of the Interior from 2011 to 2019, and from 2023 until 2026. He is a member of Unity. Between 2011 and 2014 he was a member of the Reform Party.

== Early life ==
Kozlovskis was born in 1969 in Riga. He first attended Riga Primary School No. 69 from 1976 to 1986, but switched to Murjani Sports Gymnasium in the 1986 school year and graduated from there in 1987. In 1993 he graduated from the Latvian Academy of Sport Education for his postsecondary education. In 1991, he started working as an inspector for the Ministry of the Interior before later that year becoming an inspector in the Government Security Service until 1993. From 1994 to 1996, while studying, he served as senior inspector at the State Department of Economic Sovereignty Protection. He then worked at the Security Police until 2005, eventually becoming deputy chief of the police department. He then qualified to become a lawyer through the Faculty of Law at the University of Latvia in 2003.

== Political career ==
Kozlovskis was appointed Interior Minister on 25 October 2011.

On 7 December 2015, Prime Minister Laimdota Straujuma resigned. In her resignation press release, she recommended Kozlovskis as her successor.

He was once again named Minister of the Interior as part of Evika Siliņa's cabinet on 15 September 2023. He has focused during his time on minister getting ready underground shelters to prepare a defense after the Russian invasion of Ukraine. He also focused on closing the borders, saying the country was in a "hybrid border war".

== Honours and awards ==
He has received the Order of Viesturs for his work during the 2006 Riga Summit.

Political offices
Preceded by Linda Mūrniece	Minister of the Interior; 2011–2019	Succeeded by Sandis Ģirģens
Preceded by Māris Kučinskis	Minister of the Interior; 2023–present	Incumbent
