= Latvian Academy of Sport Education =

University in Riga, Latvia

- Latvijas Sporta pedagoģijas akadēmija
- Established: 1921; 104 years ago
- Rector: Juris Grants
- Address: Brīvības gatve 333, Riga, Latvia
- Website: http://www.lspa.lv

The Latvian Academy of Sport Education (Latvian: Latvijas Sporta pedagoģijas akadēmija) is an institution of higher education specialising in sport science, located in Riga, Latvia.

== Organization ==
=== Departments ===
The Academy has 5 theoretical and 6 practical departments:

- Theoretical departments

- Department of Anatomy
- Department of Informatics
- Department of Sports Medecine
- Department of Theory
- Department of Management

- Practical departments

- Department of Swimming
- Department of Skiing
- Department of Sport Games
- Department of Heavy Athletics
- Department of Track and Field Athletics
- Department of Gymnastics

== Rectors ==
- Mārtiņš Krūze (1921–1922)
- Jēkabs Dille (1922–1925)
- Voldemārs Cekuls (1925–1940)
- Ivans Lazurka (1945-1946)
- Jevgeņijs Sretenskis (1946–1951)
- Nikolajs Neļga (1951–1958)
- Aleksis Ailis (1958–1960)
- Jurijs Berdičevskis (1960, 1962)
- Andrejs Eļhivs (1960–1962)
- Vladimirs Maksimovs (1962–1982)
- Ilgvars Forands (1982–1988)
- Uldis Grāvītis (1988–2008)
- Jānis Žīdens (2008–2019)
- Juris Grants (2019–present)

== Notable alumni ==
- Ingrīda Amantova
- Raimonds Bergmanis, former Minister of Defence of Latvia, the first flag bearer for Latvia in 56 years at 1992 Summer Olympics opening ceremony
- Deniss Čerkovskis
- Žaneta Jaunzeme-Grende, former Minister for Culture of Latvia
- Ivans Klementjevs
- Inta Kļimoviča-Drēviņa
- Rihards Kozlovskis, former Minister of the Interior of Latvia
- Armands Krauliņš
- Ivo Lakučs
- Lāsma Liepa
- Modris Liepiņš
- Staņislavs Lugailo
- Jeļena Rubļevska
- Arsens Miskarovs
- Mārtiņš Pļaviņš
- Jeļena Prokopčuka, winner of the New York City Marathon (2005, 2006)
- Andrejs Rastorgujevs
- Jānis Šmēdiņš
- Žoržs Tikmers
- Dzidra Uztupe-Karamiševa
- Edvīns Zāģeris
