= Hosams Abu Meri =

Latvian politician

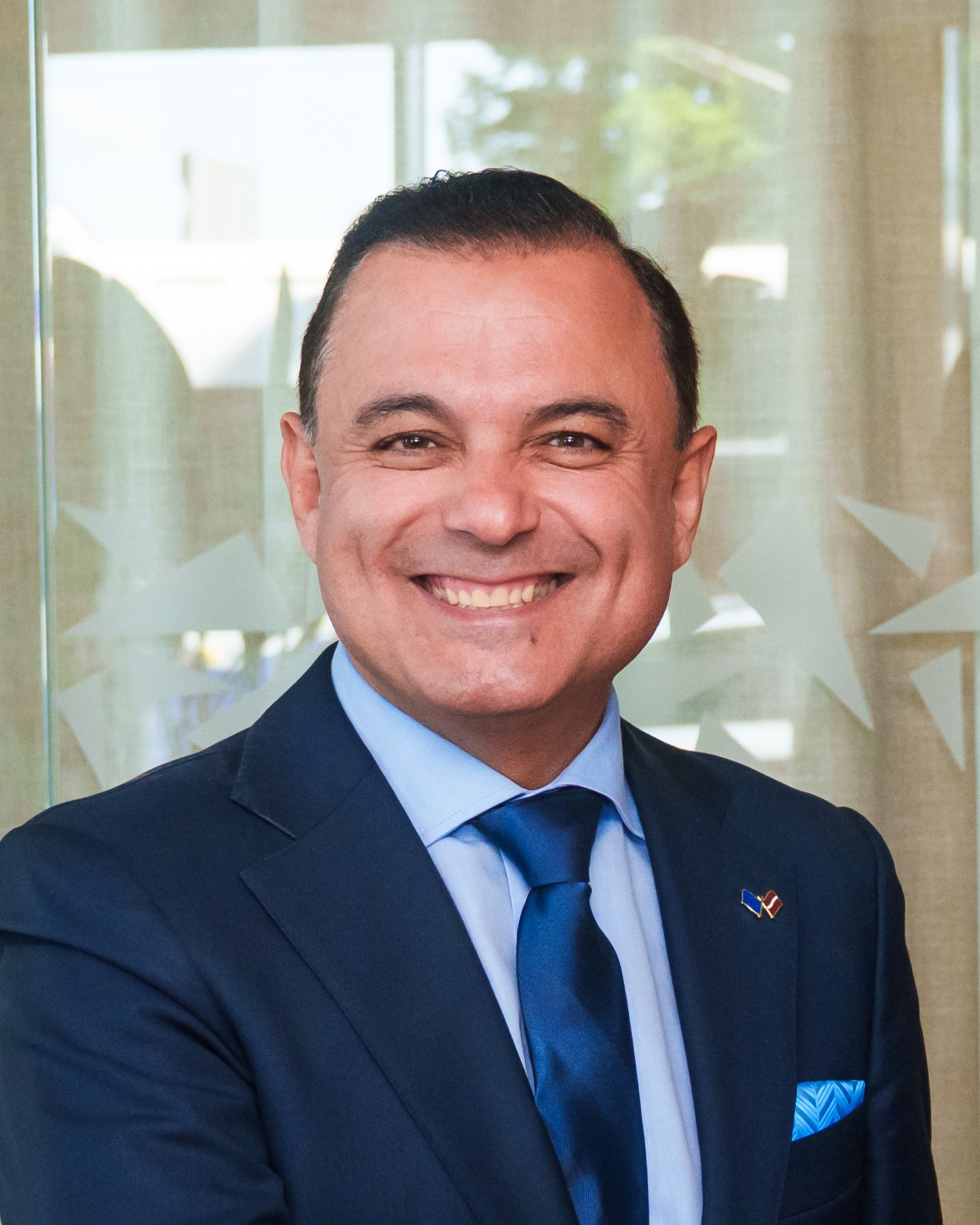
- Abu Meri in 2026

Minister for Health
- In office 15 September 2023 – 17 November 2026
- Prime Minister: Evika Siliņa; Andris Kulbergs
- Preceded by: Līga Meņģelsone
- Succeeded by: Normunds Staņēvičs

Member of the Saeima
- In office 1 November 2022 – 20 September 2023
- In office 5 November 2014 – 6 November 2018

Personal details
- Born: 20 August 1974 (age 52) Lebanon
- Citizenship: Lebanon; Latvia
- Spouse(s): Linda Mūrniece (m. 2012; div. 2017) Linda Abu Meri (m. 2019)
- Children: 2
- Education: Riga Stradiņš University; University of Latvia
- Occupation: Politician, physician

Hosams Abu Meri (Arabic: حسام أبو مرعي; born 20 August 1974) is a Lebanese–Latvian politician. He became faction head of the Unity party on 21 December 2017. He became the Minister of Health of Latvia as a part of Siliņa cabinet on 15 September 2023.
