= Kristaps Eklons =

Latvian politician and firefighter

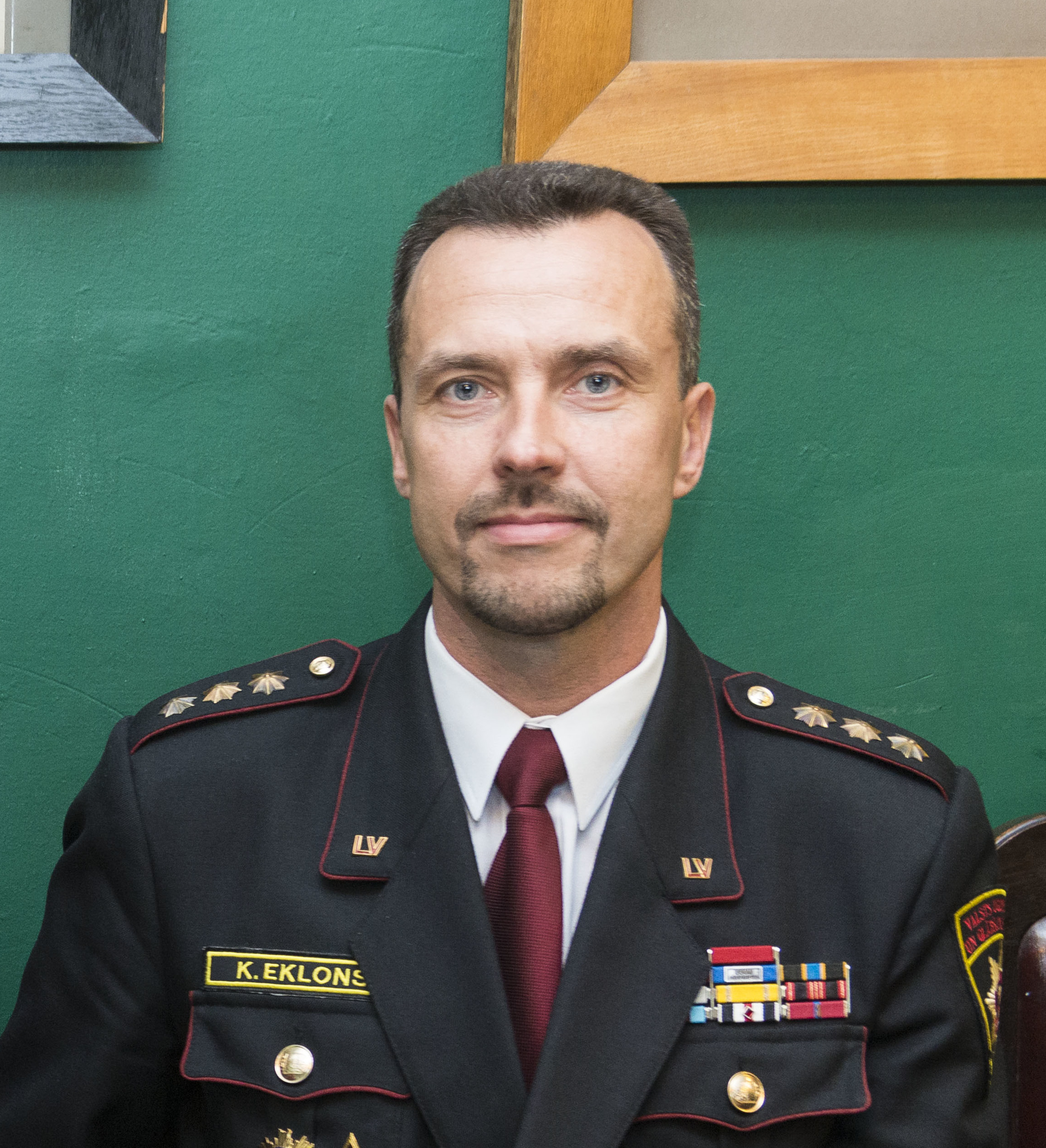
- Eklons in 2015

Minister of the Interior
- In office 26 May 2022 – 14 December 2022
- Prime Minister: Krišjānis Kariņš
- Preceded by: Artis Pabriks
- Succeeded by: Māris Kučinskis

Personal details
- Born: 4 August 1971 (age 55) Jūrmala, Latvian SSR (now Latvia)
- Party: Movement For!
- Education: Lviv Fire Protection School; Moscow Fire Protection Academy

Kristaps Eklons (born 4 August 1971) is a Latvian firefighter, a General of the State Fire and Rescue Service, and former Minister for the Interior.

== Life and career ==
He attended at the Jūrmala Elementary School No. 6 (1986–1989), then at the Lviv Fire Protection School (1989–1992), then studied at the Moscow Fire Protection Academy (1993–1997), obtaining the degree to become a fire protection engineer. In 1995, Eklons started working as the deputy commander of the Center District of the State Fire and Rescue Service, In 1997, he became the commander of the Kurzeme District. In 2000, he became the commander of the Rapid Response Brigade. In 2006, he became the deputy head of the Operational Management Department. In 2011, he became the deputy head of the State Fire and Rescue Service.

== Political career ==
In 2022, after the resignation of the Minister of Internal Affairs, Marija Golubeva, Eklons was nominated for the position of Minister of Internal Affairs. On May 26, the Saeima approved him as the minister.

In September 2022, he joined the party "Movement For!". For the 14th Saeimas elections, Eklons ran under "Development/For!" but the alliance did not retain its seats.
