= List of ministers of the interior of Latvia =

The minister of the interior of Latvia is a member of the Cabinet of Ministers of Latvia, and is the political leader of the Ministry of the Interior of Latvia. Jānis Dombrava is the current minister since May 29, 2026.

	Name	Took office	Left office	Party
1	Miķelis Valters	19 November 1918	31 August 1919	Latvian Farmers' Union
2	Alfrēds Birznieks	1 September 1919	8 December 1919	Independent
3	Arveds Bergs	9 December 1919	18 June 1921	Non-Partisan Independent Centre
4	Alberts Kviesis	18 June 1921	26 January 1923	Latvian Farmers' Union
5	Pēteris Berģis	27 January 1923	27 June 1923	Democratic Centre
	Alfrēds Birznieks, 2nd term	28 June 1923	8 May 1924	Democratic Centre
6	Pēteris Juraševskis	25 May 1924	18 December 1924	Democratic Centre
7	Eduards Laimiņš	19 December 1924	18 December 1926	Latvian Farmers' Union
8	Marģers Skujenieks	19 December 1926	23 January 1928	Rural Workers' Party
	Eduards Laimiņš, 2nd term	24 January 1928	26 March 1931	Latvian Farmers' Union
9	Ansis Petrevics	27 March 1931	5 December 1931	National Union
	Marģers Skujenieks, 2nd term	6 December 1931	31 March 1932	Progressive Union
10	Jānis Kauliņš	31 March 1932	23 March 1933	New Farmers-Small Landowners
11	Gotfrīds Mīlbergs	24 March 1933	16 March 1934	New Farmers-Small Landowners
12	Vilis Gulbis	17 March 1934	17 January 1939	LZS (until 1934 Latvian coup d'état)
12	Vilis Gulbis	17 March 1934	17 January 1939	Independent (after 15 May 1934)
13	Kornēlijs Veidnieks	18 January 1939	19 June 1940	Ulmanis régime
(14)	Vilis Lācis	20 June 1940	25 August 1940	Soviet occupation
Alternating Soviet and Nazi régimes. See Latvian Diplomatic Service in exile.
14	Aloizs Vaznis	4 July 1990	20 November 1991	Independent
15	Ziedonis Čevers	20 November 1991	3 August 1993	Independent
16	Ģirts Valdis Kristovskis	3 August 1993	28 October 1994	Latvian Way
17	Jānis Ādamsons	11 November 1994	21 December 1995	Latvian Way
18	Dainis Turlais	21 December 1995	10 July 1997	Democratic Party "Saimnieks"
	Ziedonis Čevers, 2nd term	7 August 1997	9 April 1998	Democratic Party "Saimnieks"
19	Andrejs Krastiņš	4 May 1998	26 November 1998	For Fatherland and Freedom/LNNK
20	Roberts Jurdžs	26 November 1998	16 July 1999	For Fatherland and Freedom/LNNK
21	Mareks Segliņš	16 July 1999	30 September 2002	People's Party
22	Māris Gulbis	7 November 2002	9 March 2004	New Era Party
23	Ēriks Jēkabsons	9 March 2004	21 October 2005	Latvia's First Party
24	Dzintars Jaundžeikars	3 November 2005	7 November 2006	Latvia's First Party
25	Ivars Godmanis	7 November 2006	20 December 2007	Latvian Way (until 25 August 2007)
25	Ivars Godmanis	7 November 2006	20 December 2007	LPP/LC (after 25 August 2007)
	Mareks Segliņš, 2nd term	20 December 2007	12 March 2009	People's Party
26	Linda Mūrniece	12 March 2009	6 June 2011	New Era Party
27	Rihards Kozlovskis	25 October 2011	23 January 2019	Unity
28	Sandis Ģirģens	23 January 2019	3 June 2021	KPV LV
29	Marija Golubeva	3 June 2021	16 May 2022	Development/For!
30	Artis Pabriks	16 May 2022	26 May 2022	Development/For!
31	Kristaps Eklons	26 May 2022	14 December 2022	Independent
32	Māris Kučinskis	14 December 2022	15 September 2023	United List
(27)	Rihards Kozlovskis	15 September 2023	29 May 2026	New Unity
33	Jānis Dombrava	29 May 2026	incumbent	National Alliance
