= Jānis Dombrava =

Latvian politician

Minister of the Interior
- Incumbent
- Assumed office 29 May 2026
- Prime Minister: Andris Kulbergs
- Preceded by: Rihards Kozlovskis

Member of the 14th Saeima
- In office 1 November 2022 – 4 June 2026
- Prime Minister: Krišjānis Kariņš; Evika Siliņa

Member of the 13th Saeima
- In office 6 November 2018 – 1 November 2022
- President: Egils Levits
- Prime Minister: Krišjānis Kariņš

Member of the 12th Saeima
- In office 4 November 2014 – 6 November 2018
- President: Raimonds Vējonis; Andris Bērziņš
- Prime Minister: Māris Kučinskis; Laimdota Straujuma

Personal details
- Born: 29 June 1988 (age 38) Riga, Latvian SSR
- Party: National Alliance (since 2011)
- Education: Latvijas Universitāte
- Occupation: Politician, historian

Jānis Dombrava (born 1988 in Riga) is a Latvian politician and historian serving as the Minister of the Interior of Latvia since 2026, he has been previously elected in the 14th Saeima, chairman of the National Defence Committee, and has been a member of Saeima from 2010 till 2026.

== Biography ==
J. Dombrava was born in Riga. Attended the Natalija Draudzina gymnasium. After acquiring secondary education at Riga Rainis 8th evening (shift) secondary School, he enrolled in the Faculty of History and Philosophy of the University of Latvia, which he graduated in 2010 with a Bachelor's degree.

J. Dombrava was married to Ieva Bērziņa, in 2011 family welcomed a daughter. Divorced in 2016. In 2021 he married Annija Asmine (in a relationship since 2017), he has a daughter and a son from this marriage.

Before becoming a parliamentary deputy, J. Dombrava worked various jobs from the age of 15, including in construction and IT.

== Political activity ==
In 2005 he joined the organization "All for Latvia", which became a political party in the following year. He was the head of the party’s Riga Vidzeme district division and later the combined Riga division, as well as a board member.

On 8 February 2007 J. Dombrava was one of the participants in a protest organised by "All for Latvia" against the recognition of territory of Abrene (formerly part of Latvia) as part of Russia, there was a cold of minus 18 degrees Celsius outside and they were all half-naked with Latvian cities written on them. On 10 March 2009 "All for Latvia" organized an act against the closure of rural schools. The campaign united approximately 200 schools and 20,000 people across Latvia, simultaneously lighting unity bonfires. J. Dombrava also ran for the Riga city elections in 2009, but the party "All for Latvia" did not get enough support to get over the threshold.

In 2010 he ran for the Saeima elections from the National Alliance and was elected to the Saeima from Vidzeme constituency. J. Dombrava is the youngest member of Saeima after the restoration of Latvia's statehood (elected at the age of 22, some members have also been elected at the same age, but were few months older – Maris Vitols, Juris Sokolovskis and Janis Upenieks).

In the 2011 snap parliamentary elections, J. Dombrava was elected to the 11th Saeima as a member of the National Alliance. He was re-elected in the 2014 12th Saeima elections. In the fall of 2018, he was elected to the 13th Saeima, becoming the first deputy in Latvian history to be elected to four parliamentary terms before the age of 30. He also ran in the 2019 European Parliament elections but was not elected.

J. Dombrava has also been active in his efforts to restrict migration, standing against "refugee quotas", achieving that social benefits for refugees are restricted, and asking the Saeima to reject UN Global migration pact.

In June 2018, due to his political activities, he was included in Russia’s “blacklist.”

In August 2021, amid the Belarus border crisis, J. Dombrava repeatedly called for swift action to strengthen the Latvian-Belarusian border, including supporting the idea of granting authorization to use weapons. Later, as it was revealed that migrants were paying up to €10,000 to reach the EU border, he stated that the crisis was part of hybrid warfare and that the border should be completely closed to illegal immigration.

In September 2021, J. Dombrava opposed a €40 million compensation package for the Jewish community, arguing that the actual beneficiaries were not Holocaust survivors but a specific organization allegedly linked to money laundering and Russian oligarchs under sanctions. In February 2022, he voted against the final reading of the so-called Jewish restitution compensation, arguing that support should be provided to all politically repressed persons in Latvia, including the Latvian Association of Politically Repressed Persons.

In the fall of 2022, J. Dombrava was elected to the 14th Saeima. In December 2022, he was appointed as chairman of the Saeima’s National Security Committee.

He led the National Security Committee until October 2023, when he was elected as the committee’s deputy chairman, with leadership passing to Ainārs Latkovskis. Dombrava stated that during his tenure, pro-Kremlin activities had decreased and that more individuals engaging in such activities had been identified. Upon leaving the chairmanship, he highlighted accomplishments such as the approval of the National Security Concept, the State Defense Concept, and legal changes ensuring that individuals who threaten national security can no longer work with classified information. He also supported legal amendments allowing state and municipal institutions to dismiss individuals disloyal to the state and contributed to overall stability in Latvia. He also pushed for legal reforms to review the status of foreign-owned real estate in Latvia, restricting the ability to conceal assets owned by sanctioned individuals.

Continuing his work in the National Security Committee, he has supported increased military spending and the development of the National Armed Forces to ensure national security. He has repeatedly emphasized the importance of national security, backing legal amendments to reduce bureaucratic obstacles and facilitate access to firearms for National Armed Forces personnel for self-defense, though these were not approved.

In 2023, Dombrava continued to express a firm stance against immigration, particularly opposing the EU’s refugee quota system and emphasizing that Latvia must control immigration to protect national interests and culture. He has repeatedly criticized EU policies that, in his view, impose excessive obligations on Latvia to accept refugees. He has also supported legal amendments reinforcing the use of the Latvian language in education and the labor market and opposed efforts to diminish the role of the Latvian language in society, particularly in education.

In April 2024, he advocated for Latvia’s national security and the protection of state secrets, participating in legislative processes that amended state secret laws to enhance security requirements.

In January 2025, he actively supported legislative amendments proposed by the National Security Committee, which would require citizens of Russia, Belarus, and other CIS countries holding visas issued by Schengen states to fill out a questionnaire before entering Latvia, specifying their travel purpose, duration, and location of stay to assess potential security risks.

== Political views ==
=== Immigration ===
J. Dombrava has consistently voiced strong criticism against immigration from Third World countries, particularly during the 2015 migrant crisis, when he opposed “refugee quotas,” arguing that migrants come from high terrorism-risk countries, refugee benefits strain national budgets, and significant cultural differences create social tensions. He was among the deputies who successfully pushed for the reduction of refugee social benefits, arguing that “Our priority should be our own citizens, not migrants from other countries,” emphasizing that the benefits were disproportionately high compared to those available to local residents.

in 2018, he was also one of the MPs with whose voice a resolution was passed calling on the government not to adopt the UN global Migration Pact.

J. Dombrava has also been critical of foreign students, arguing that many use studying in Latvia as a way to obtain residence permits while actually working full-time in unskilled jobs. He has actively pushed for residence permit reforms to address this issue. Before and after that J. Dombrava has actively stood for the reformation of these residence permits.

With other National Alliance MPs, he has proposed legal amendments to cap the number of temporary residence permits issued to third-country nationals at 5,000 per year.

=== Views on politics of Russia and USSR ===
J. Dombrava has consistently advocated for reducing Russian influence in Latvia, including limiting municipal cooperation with Russia, ending the sale of residence permits, restricting the public display of Soviet symbols, and strengthening Latvia’s defense against potential military threats from Russia. asking to abolish the sales of residence permits, submitting bills that restrict the use of USSR symbolics in public spaces, and has called to strengthen the defence of Latvia against potential military threats created by Russia.

In 2014, even before the annexation of Crimea, he criticized Foreign Minister Edgars Rinkēvičs for failing to recognize Russian threats.

As a deputy, J. Dombrava has repeatedly supported the dismantling of the controversial so-called "monument to the liberators of Soviet Latvia and Riga from German fascist invaders", and in 2019, when the necessary 10,000 signatures on the proposal to dismantle it were collected he was a member of a respective work group in the parliament. In the context of a monument of similar nature in Limbazi, he supported the initiative to achieve the dismantling of the USSR monument. When a note of protest was submitted by the Russian Ministry of Foreign Affairs in connection with the event, J. Dombrava stated that "by advocating for the dismantled commemorative stone, Russia is humiliating itself as it seeks to simultaneously justify the killers and advocates legitimising the occupation regime of the USSR."

According to J. Dombrava, 9 May in Latvia is the way Russia maintains the identity of USSR to Russians living in Latvia, which he calls the "cult of 9th of May". He also denies any connection between the monument and the liberation from Germans, which is justified by the fact that in 1944, in Estonia, where German troops had already retreated and an independent state was declared, the USSR occupied it regardless.

Since 2017, J. Dombrava has repeatedly initiated initiatives to remove the USSR symbols from the railings at the Stone bridge.

In June 2018 due to his political activity he was put in the "blacklist" of Russia.

Similarly, on 9 May 2020, at the start of the coronavirus pandemic, when there were strict restrictions on gatherings, he tweeted that responsible officials should take responsibility for the failure to limit the flow of people to the "Victory Monument."

=== International activities ===
In 2011, after the Belarusian presidential elections, when there was a suppression of opposition protests, along with members of the faction of the National Alliance, he urged the Saeima to adopt a statement condemning violent repression of protesters in Belarus. Also in 2020, following the results of the Belarusian presidential elections, there was one of those calling for a new legitimate Belarusian presidential election.

In 2013, he asked the Estonian Parliament not to make "mistakes of Latvia" in relation to the ratification of the Estonia-Russia border agreement, which included the abandonment of the claims on Petseri region, just as Latvia waived the rights to Abrene.

J. Dombrava has condemned Russia's occupation of Georgian and Ukrainian territories in debates of Saeima, in the Parliamentary Assembly of the Council of Europe and publications. In late 2013, he participated in Ukraine's Maidan, where he pointed out that it was not the east or the west who had the right to decide on the future of the Ukrainian people, but the Ukrainian people themselves.

He has supported Saeima statements supporting Ukrainian sovereignty and Ukrainian armed forces, and has participated in related fundraising campaigns.

=== State language and symbolics ===
In 2011, J. Dombrava actively participated in the signature collection campaign initiated by the National alliance on unified education in the state (Latvian) language exclusively. He supported the corresponding amendments once they were reviewed by the Saeima. He has also been one of those MPs who in 2018 only supported education in the national language at the level of primary education. In 2020, he was one of the supporters of the draft law on ensuring the use of Latvian language in kindergartens.

In 2012, when there was a referendum on Russian as the second language of the country, he voiced sharp criticism against the supporters of this idea, and called to vote against, he also highlighted the high proportion of supporters of the idea in prison, saying that "we can only judge that N. Usakovs and J Urbanovics, with the announcement that they will vote for Russian in the referendum, want to win favor from most dedicated supporters of Russian language – criminals." In the context of this referendum, J. Dombrava mentioned the example of Belarus, saying that a similar introduction of bilingualism in Belarus has actually led to the almost complete elimination of Belarusian from the public space.

As early as 2012, he expressed the need to introduce tougher penalties for desecrating the Freedom Monument. In 2020, he submitted and secured the adoption of a draft law in Saeima on the Freedom Monument and the Brothers' Cemetery, which establishes a special protection zone for these objects.

=== COVID-19 pandemic ===
On 24 February 2020, even before the state of emergency was declared, J. Dombrava and other members of the National Alliance called for traffic to be suspended with the countries affected by the COVID-19 virus, so that the virus is not brought into Latvia and there are no national restrictions. There were similar calls to halt migration from abroad followed on summer and autumn 2020, when the spread of the virus in Latvia was halted.

In December 2020, J. Dombrava published an article where he expressed an opinion that people who speak out negatively against vaccination or the pandemic should not be condemned, which he bases on the fact that 'they are all our fellow human beings. It's our society. It has different views and needs to be tried to understand before being condemned. Honest, open and respectful communication must happen to all people, not just some."

Unlike other coalition members, J. Dombrava has also opposed mandatory vaccination of certain professions, offering to care primarily for vaccinations of all persons in risk groups.

== Results in elections ==
Year	Elections	Party	Constituency	Place in list	Place in result	Result
2009	Riga city elections	All for Latvia!	Rīga	6.	6.	not elected
2010	2010 Latvian parliamentary election	National alliance	Vidzeme	5.	3.	elected
2011	2011 Latvian parliamentary election	National alliance	Vidzeme	2.	2.	elected
2014	2014 Latvia parliamentary election	National alliance	Vidzeme	2.	2.	elected
2018	2018 Latvia parliamentary election	National alliance	Vidzeme	3.	3.	elected
2022	2022 Latvia parliamentary election	National alliance	Vidzeme	3.	3.	elected
