= Sandis Ģirģens =

Latvian politician

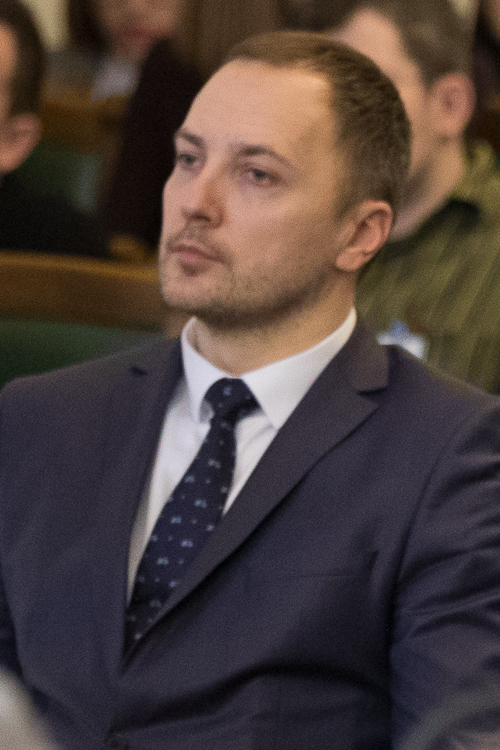

Minister of the Interior
- In office 23 January 2019 – 3 June 2021
- Prime Minister: Krišjānis Kariņš
- Preceded by: Rihards Kozlovskis
- Succeeded by: Marija Golubeva

Personal details
- Born: 11 May 1980 (age 46) Jēkabpils, Latvian SSR (now Latvia)
- Party: Republic
- Education: Turība University

Sandis Ģirģens (born 11 May 1980) is a Latvian politician. From 23 January 2019 to 3 June 2021, he served as Minister of the Interior in the Kariņš cabinet.
