= Gundars Daudze =

Latvian politician (born 1965)

- Daudze in 2018

Member of the 14th Saeima
- Incumbent
- Assumed office 1 November 2022
- Premier: Krišjānis Kariņš; Evika Siliņa

Speaker of the Saeima
- In office 24 September 2007 – 2 November 2010
- Premier: Valdis Dombrovskis; Ivars Godmanis; Aigars Kalvītis

Head of the Chancery of the President of Latvia
- In office 8 July 2011 – 3 November 2014
- Premier: Valdis Dombrovskis; Laimdota Straujuma

Personal details
- Born: May 9, 1965 (age 61) Riga, Latvian SSR
- Party: For Latvia and Ventspils
- Education: Riga Stradiņš University
- Occupation: Politician

Gundars Daudze (born 9 May 1965) is a Latvian physician and politician, Speaker of the 9th Saeima (parliament) of Latvia (2007-2010). He is a member of the For Latvia and Ventspils party, which participates in national elections as a member of the Union of Greens and Farmers list.
