= Līga Meņģelsone =

Latvian politician and businessperson

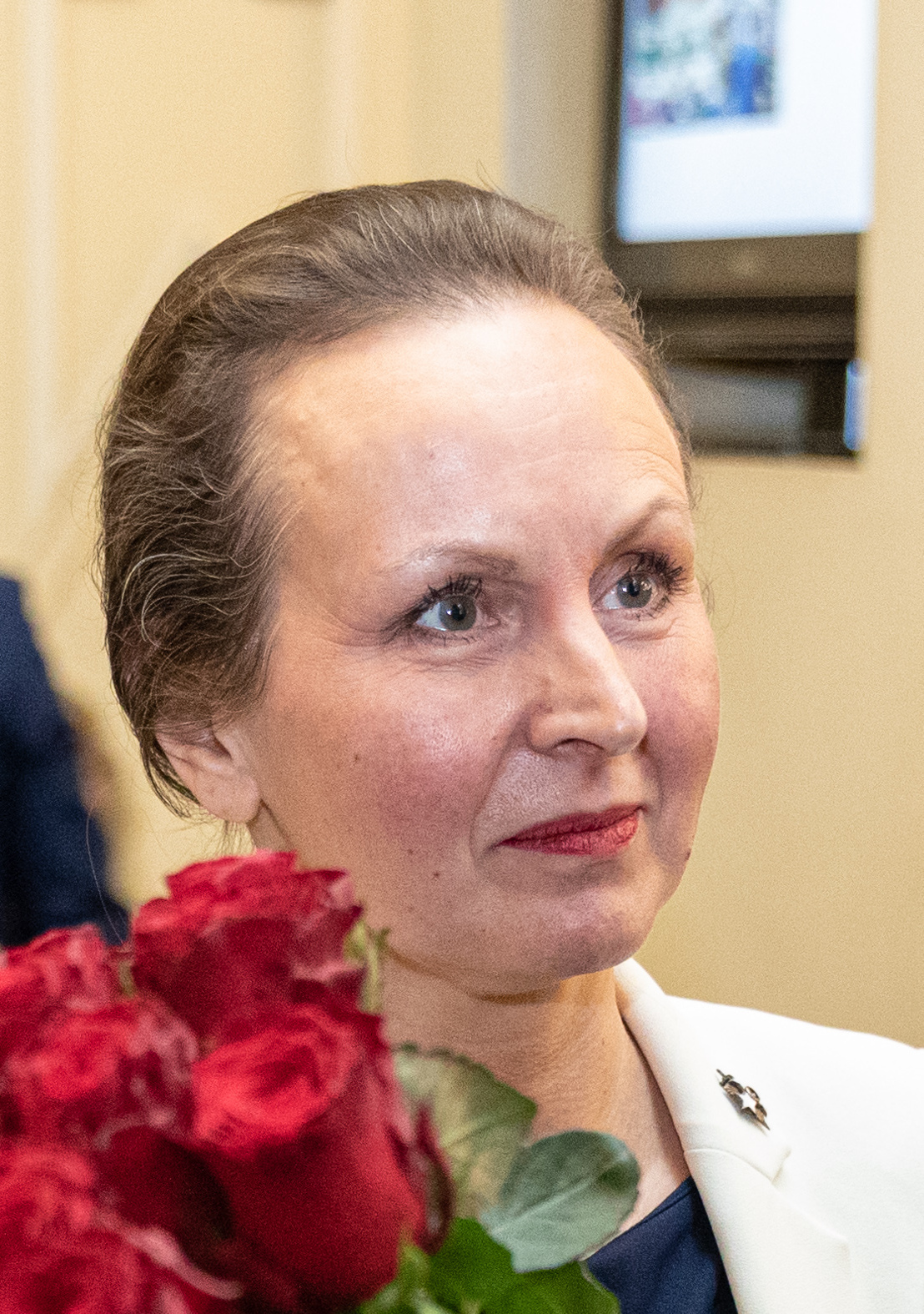

Minister for Health of the Republic of Latvia
- In office 14 December 2022 – 15 September 2023
- Premier: Krišjānis Kariņš
- Preceded by: Daniels Pavļuts
- Succeeded by: Hosams Abu Meri

Personal details
- Born: 31 May 1972 (age 54) Latvian SSR
- Education: University of Latvia
- Occupation: Businessperson

Līga Meņģelsone (born 31 May 1972) is a Latvian businesswoman and politician. She was a non-party Latvian Minister of Health in the government of Krišjānis Karinis. Before that, she was Director General of the Latvian Employers' Confederation (LDDK).

== Biography ==
Born 31 May 1972. Studied at the Latvian Academy of Culture, Bachelor of Culture Management, and later International Economic Relations at the University of Latvia.

Head of the sales department of the transit company "Noord Natie Ventspils Terminals", head of the marketing and sales department at "Coats Latvija", public relations specialist at "Es&Partneri".

From 2001 to 2004, Ms Meņģelsone was Director of the news agency BNS Latvija, in 2005 – Member of the Board of Mediju Grupa Tops Ltd, in 2008 and 2009 – Member of the Board of News Media Group+ JSC and chairman of the Board of Telegraf Ltd.

In August 2011, Ms Mņģelsons was elected Director General of the Employers' Confederation of Latvia (LDDK).

In early December 2022, the United List party alliance nominated her as its candidate for Minister of Health. This position was won when the Saeima approved the 2nd government of Krišjānis Kariņš on 14 December.

After the resignation of the Kāriņš government, when the new government of Evika Siliņa was formed, Meņģelsone initially applied to join the "Unity" party, represented by the future head of government, but withdrew her application a few days later after failing to agree on a position in the new government.
