= Kārlis Leiškalns =

Latvian politician

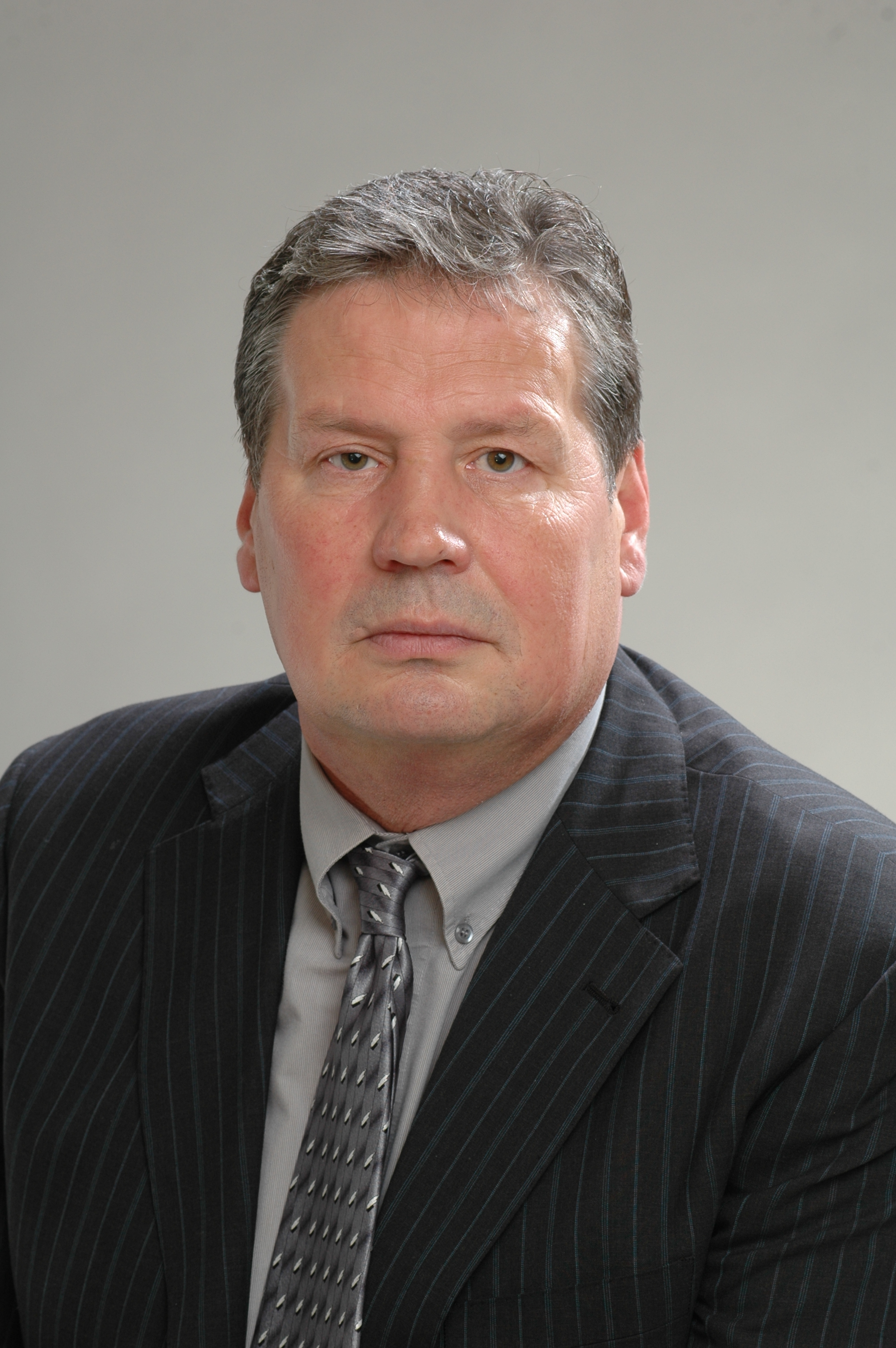
- Kārlis Leiškalns in 2006

Member of the Saeima
- In office July 6, 1993 – November 4, 2002
- In office November 16, 2006 – November 2, 2010

Personal details
- Born: August 10, 1951 (age 74) Jūrmala, Latvian SSR, Soviet Union
- Party: People's Party (2006-2010)
- Other political affiliations: Latvian Way (1995-2005); Democratic Center (1993-1994); Popular Front of Latvia (1988-19??)

Kārlis Leiškalns (born August 10, 1951) is a Latvian politician born in Jūrmala. He was a Deputy of the Saeima and most recently a member of the People's Party.
