= Andrew Ezergailis =

American-Latvian historian (1930–2022)

- Andrievs Ezergailis
- Born: October 12, 1930; Rite Parish, Latvia
- Died: January 22, 2022 (aged 91); Ithaca, New York, the United States
- Occupation: Professor of History
- Spouse: Inta Ezergailis
- Parent(s): Jānis Ezergailis and Berta Ezergaile (née Gaile)
- Awards: Order of the Three Stars (2007), Grand Medal of the Latvian Academy of Sciences (2012)

Academic background
- Education: University of Michigan (1964), New York University (1968)
- Thesis: The Bolshevik Revolution in Latvia, March to August 1917 (1968)

Academic work
- Discipline: 20th-century history of Latvia
- Sub-discipline: 1917 Revolution and the Holocaust in Latvia
- Institutions: Ithaca College

Andrew Ezergailis (Latvian: Andrievs Ezergailis; born 10 December 1930 in Rite Parish, died 22 January 2022 in Ithaca, New York) was a professor of history at Ithaca College, known for his research into the 20th-century history of Latvia, particularly of the 1917 Revolution and the Holocaust in Latvia.

In August 2007, Ezergailis was awarded the Cross of the Order of the Three Stars, one of the highest honors of Latvia, for his contributions to understanding the history of the country.

Andrew was married to Inta Ezergailis, a professor of German Literature at Cornell University.

== Books ==
- 2005: Nazi/Soviet Disinformation about the Holocaust in Latvia: Daugavas Vanagi: Who are they?, ISBN 9984-9613-6-2
- 2002: Stockholm Documents: The German Occupation of Latvia, 1941–1945: What Did America Know?, a collection of records of the United States Department of State, edited by A. Ezergalis
- 1999: Holokausts vācu okupētajā Latvijā: 1941–1944 (in Latvian)
- 1996: The Holocaust in Latvia 1941–1944 – The Missing Center, Historical Institute of Latvia (in association with the United States Holocaust Memorial Museum) Riga ISBN 9984-9054-3-8
- 1983: The Latvian impact on the Bolshevik Revolution: The first phase : September 1917 to April 1918, ISBN 0-88033-035-X
- 1974: The 1917 Revolution in Latvia (East European Monographs, No 8)
