= Vitālijs Aizbalts =

Latvian politician

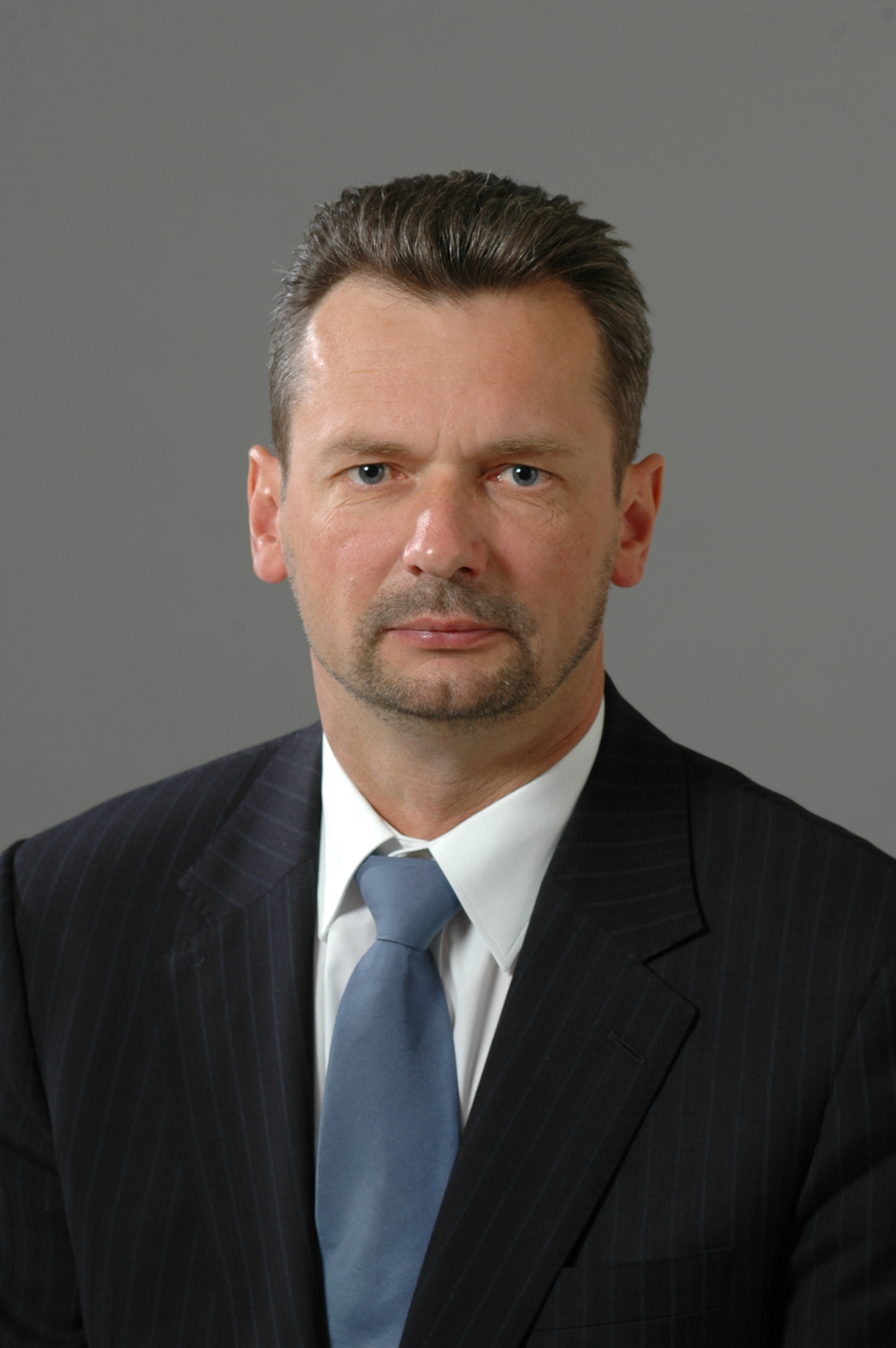
Vitālijs Aizbalts

Vitālijs Aizbalts (born February 1, 1959) is a Latvian politician. He is a member of the LPP/LC and a deputy of the 9th Saeima (Latvian Parliament). He began his current term in parliament on November 7, 2006. He was born in Daugavpils.
