= Māris Ārbergs =

Latvian politician (born 1962)

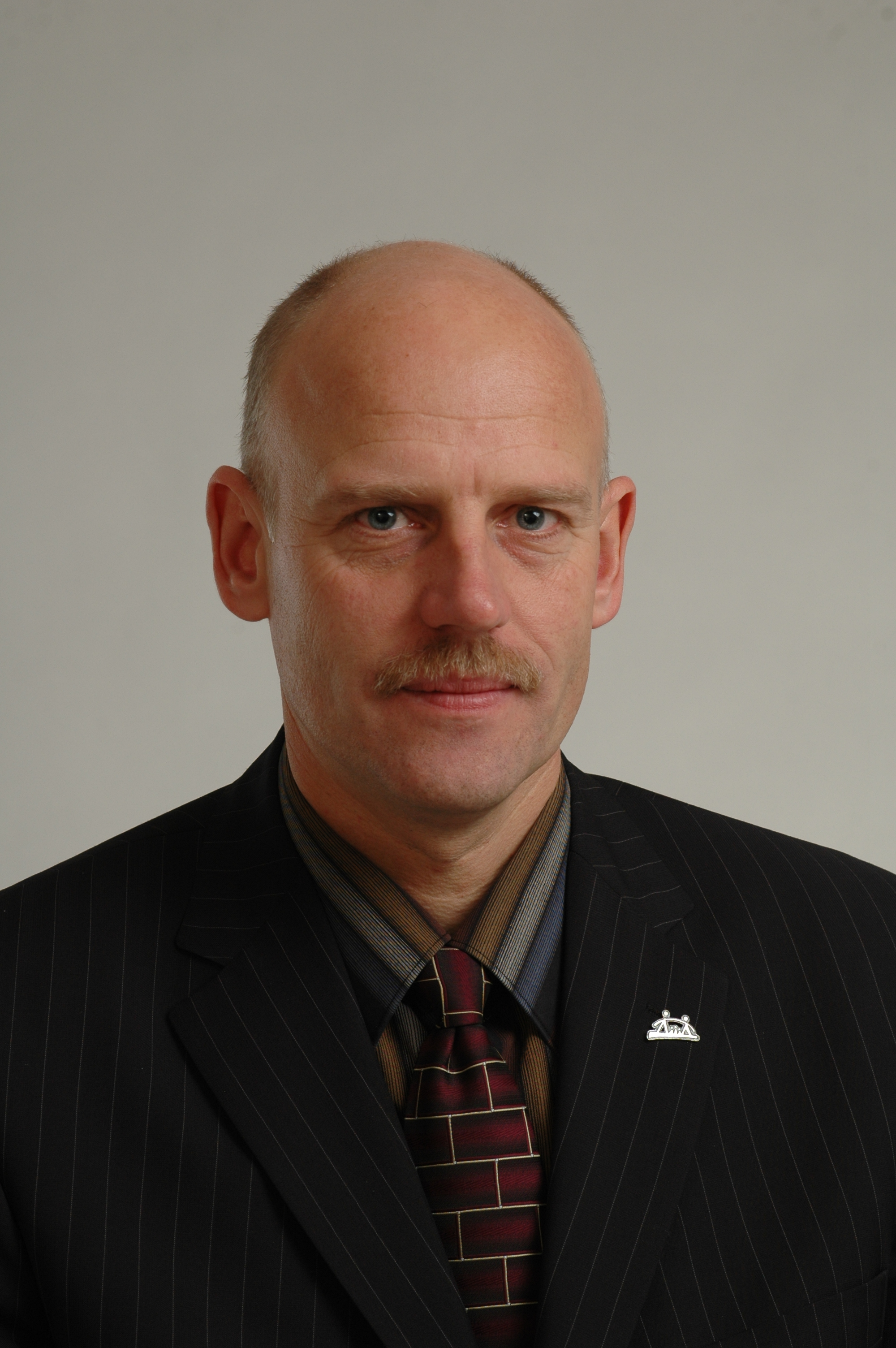
Māris Ārbergs

Māris Ārbergs (born 1962) is a Latvian politician. He was a Deputy of the Saeima from 2006 to 2010, as a member of the People's Party.
