= N-2′-Indolylnaltrexamine =

Opioid

N-2'-Indolylnaltrexamine

Identifiers
- PubChem CID: 102340665
- ChemSpider: 58136807
- ChEMBL: ChEMBL3319610
- CompTox Dashboard (EPA): DTXSID901032384

Chemical and physical data
- Formula: C_{29}H_{31}N_{3}O_{4}
- Molar mass: 485.584 g·mol^{−1}
- 3D model (JSmol): Interactive image
- SMILES: c1ccc2c(c1)cc([nH]2)C(=O)N[C@@H]3CC[C@]4([C@H]5Cc6ccc(c7c6[C@]4([C@H]3O7)CCN5CC8CC8)O)O
- InChI: InChI=1S/C29H31N3O4/c33-22-8-7-18-14-23-29(35)10-9-20(31-27(34)21-13-17-3-1-2-4-19(17)30-21)26-28(29,24(18)25(22)36-26)11-12-32(23)15-16-5-6-16/h1-4,7-8,13,16,20,23,26,30,33,35H,5-6,9-12,14-15H2,(H,31,34)/t20-,23-,26+,28+,29-/m1/s1; Key:FANZOSRNSKEJDL-XSGLBDKUSA-N

N-2′-Indolylnaltrexamine (INTA) is an opioid and derivative of β-naltrexamine. This molecule is loosely derived from the classical opioid morphine. This experimental drug candidate is under development as a κ-opioid receptor agonist for pain management with fewer adverse side effects. Preclinical study in mice showed potent analgesic effects with no tolerance or dependence. The mice also showed no adverse effects in the conditioned place aversion assay.

== Action ==
INTA acts on the body by binding to a G-protein coupled receptor (GPCR) called the opioid receptor. Opioid Receptors, themselves, are divided into different subunits: kappa (KOR), delta (DOR), and mu (MOR) receptors. When INTA binds to the receptors, it is actually binding to a heteromer of the receptor. This means that it is binding to two of the subunits, instead of just one. These two receptors "work together" to form a conformation to block the recruitment of a protein family known as the β-arrestins. These proteins are responsible for the regulation of GPCR's and they cause the internalization of the receptor to prevent further activation, leading to an increased tolerance to opioid drugs.

=== Classic side effects ===
Some of the classic side effects of opioid drugs include:

- Dysphoria/Euphoria
- Loss of motivation/sedation
- Tolerance
- Dependency/withdrawals
- Loss of motor control

These side effects are associated with the recruitment of β-arrestin and the activation of the p38 MAPK and other secondary signaling cascades that are dependent on β-arrestin.

== In vivo studies ==
=== Analgesia and tolerance ===
INTA was found to have an intrathecal ED_{50} of 21.07 pmol/mouse, a subcutaneous ED_{50} 0.97 mg/kg, which is nine times more effective than morphine and an oral ED_{50} 9.08 mg/kg which is four times less effective than morphine. These were determined via a tail flick assay in which the researchers used a heat source on the tail of a mouse and measured how long the mouse could stand the heat before flicking their tail in distress. After three days of administering INTA to the mice, they found that the effective dose for an analgesic effect stayed the same, indicating no tolerance build up.

=== Conditioned place aversion assay ===
In the conditioned place aversion assay, the researchers were looking for an aversion to one side of the box used in the assay. If they spent more time away from the conditioned side of the box, they had a negative experience, typically withdrawal symptoms. When the assay was run with INTA, they found the opposite. There was a strong dose dependent reward mechanism involved. This means that the mice spent more time on the side of the box used for the conditioning experiments, indicating that they were receiving a pleasurable stimulus from the drug.
