= Pauls Putniņš =

Latvian playwright, journalist, and politician (1937–2018)

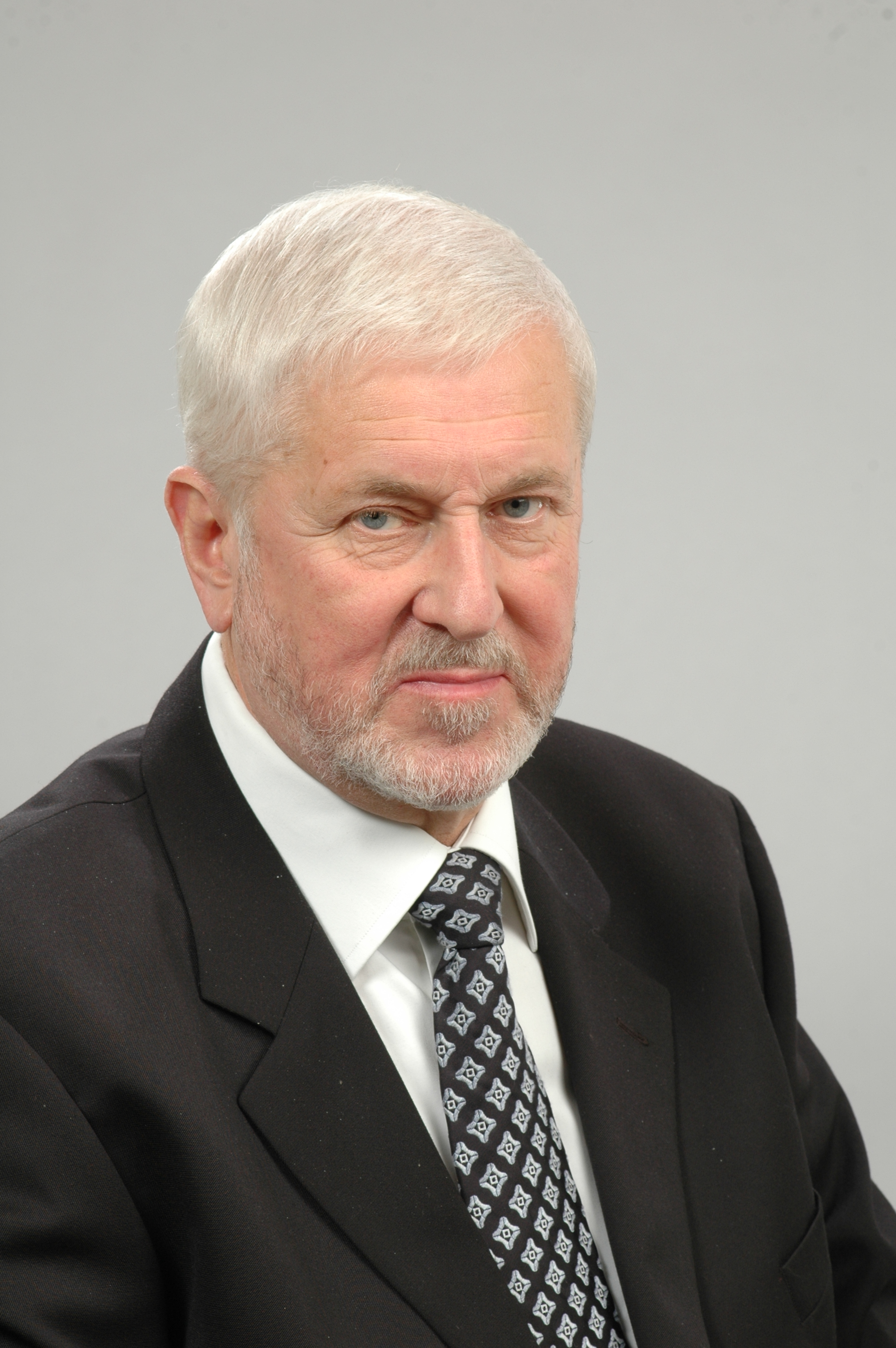
- Born: november 12th 1937; Reinkļāvi, Vecpiebalgas pagasts, Cēsu aprinķis, Rīga
- Died: december 1st 2018
- Education: Latvijas valsts konservatorija
- Occupation: playwright
- Spouse: Līga liepiņa (1946-2018)
- Children: Anna putniņa (1971) Indriķis putniņš (1979)
- Writing career
- Language: Latvian
- Period: 1968-2005
- Notable works: plays Gaidīšanas svētki, Es savos zābakos adaptation of the novel mērnieku laiki by Reinis kaudzīte and Matīss kaudzīte into a play of the same name.
- Notable awards: LPSR Nopelniem bagātais kultūras darbinieks Andreja Upīša prēmija (Skrīveri) Andreja Pumpura prēmija Annas Brigaderes prēmija Autortiesību bezgalības balva Triju Zvaigžņu ordenis Latvijas Republikas Ministru kabineta Atzinības raksts

Pauls Putniņš (12 November 1937 – 1 December 2018) was a Latvian playwright, journalist and politician.

== Biography ==
He graduated from the Latvian State Conservatory in 1963, after which he worked as an assistant director and director at the Dailes and Liepāja Theatres. A dramatist from 1965, he was one of the most popular Latvian playwrights in the 1970s and 1980s, writing over 30 plays; some 25 of his works were staged in professional and amateur theatres across Latvia. Putniņš is a member of the Latvian Writers' Union and a member of the Union of Theatre Workers, and became a Playwrights Guild member in 1999.

In the Latvian independence period he became involved in politics. He was elected the fifth and sixth Parliamentary deputy from the Latvian Farmers' Union, and was then elected to the Riga City Council. In 2010 he was announced that would not stand for the 10th Parliamentary elections and would leave politics.
