= Alfrēds Birznieks =

Latvian politician (1889–1942)

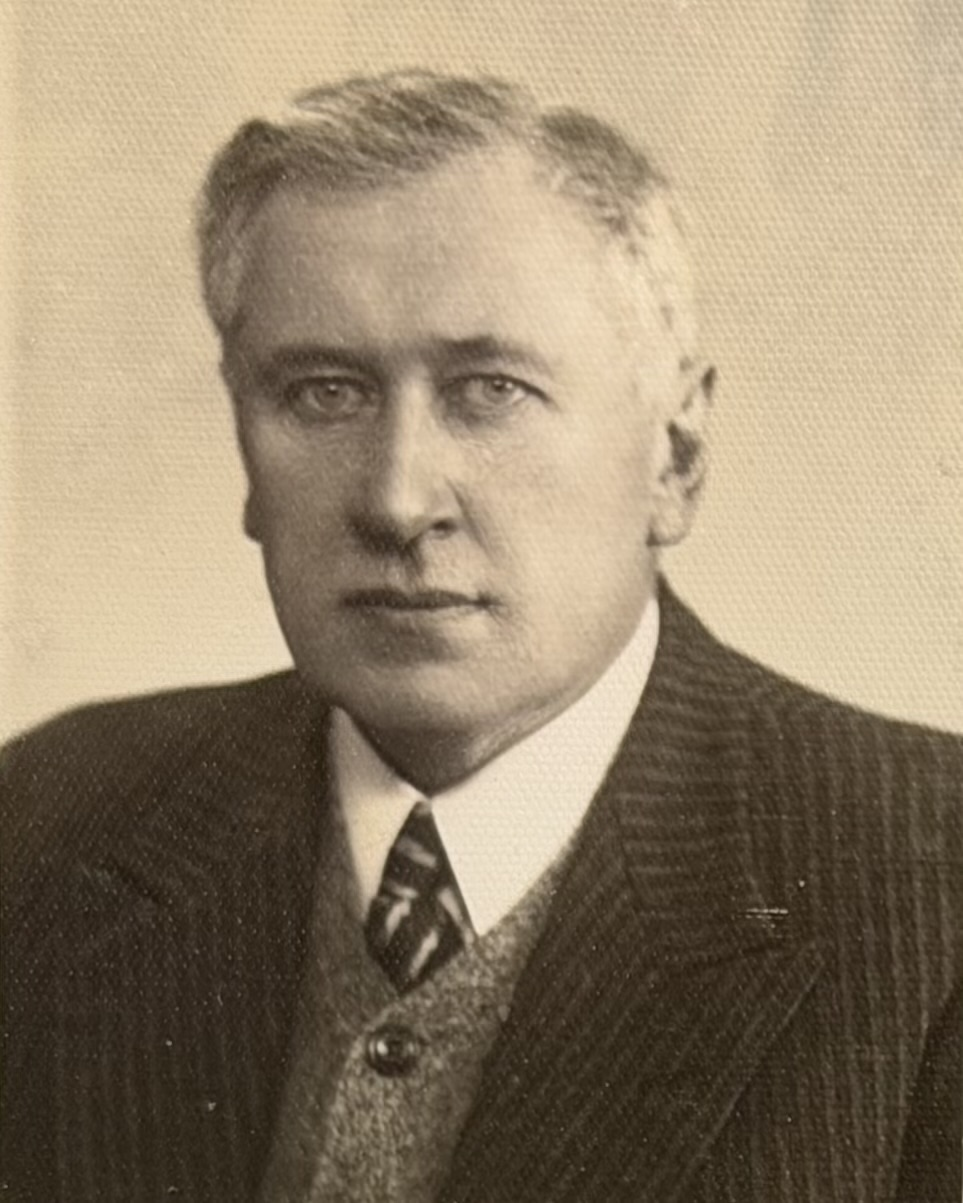
Photograph of Alfrēds Birznieks.

Alfrēds Birznieks (13 February 1889 – 28 April 1942) was a Latvian politician and lawyer. He was the acting Minister of the Interior of the Republic of Latvia from 6 September 1919 to 8 December 1919, and the Minister of the Interior from 20 June 1923 to 8 May 1924.

After the Soviet occupation of Baltic states he was imprisoned in Usollag forced labor camp, was sentenced to death there, but died before the execution.
