= Valdis Ģīlis =

Latvian politician (born 1954)

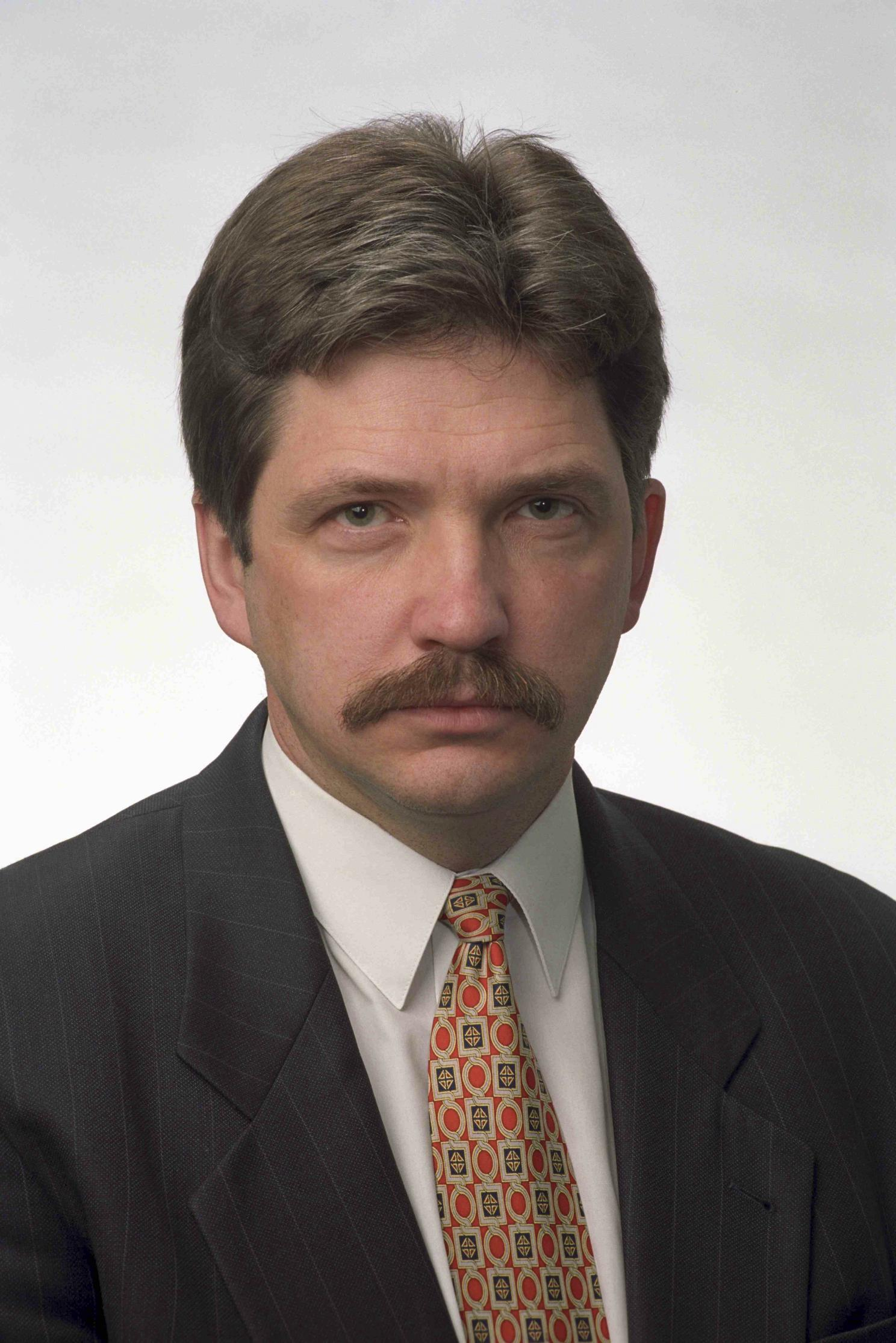
Valdis Ģīlis

Valdis Ģīlis (born 1954) is a Latvian politician and was a Deputy of the 9th Saeima. He is a member of the People's Party.
