= Eriks Jekabsons =

Latvian politician

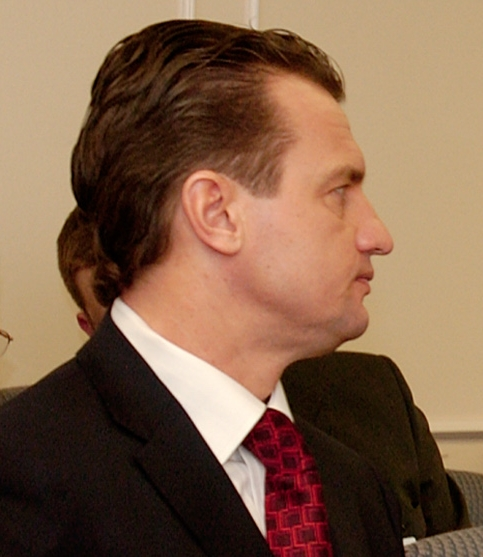
Eriks Jekabsons (2005)

Eriks Jekabsons (born 3 April 1959) is a Latvian politician who served as a Minister of Internal Affairs of Latvia.

== Biography ==
Born on April 3, 1959, in Riga, he studied at the Riga Industrial Polytechnic and obtained a degree in furniture production. Between 1978 and 1980, he served in the Soviet Army and studied at the Latvian State Institute of Physical Culture.

Formerly a member of Latvia's First Party, he left the party in 2005. In the same year, he married Natalija, his second marriage.
