= Jānis Eglītis =

Latvian politician (1961–2013)

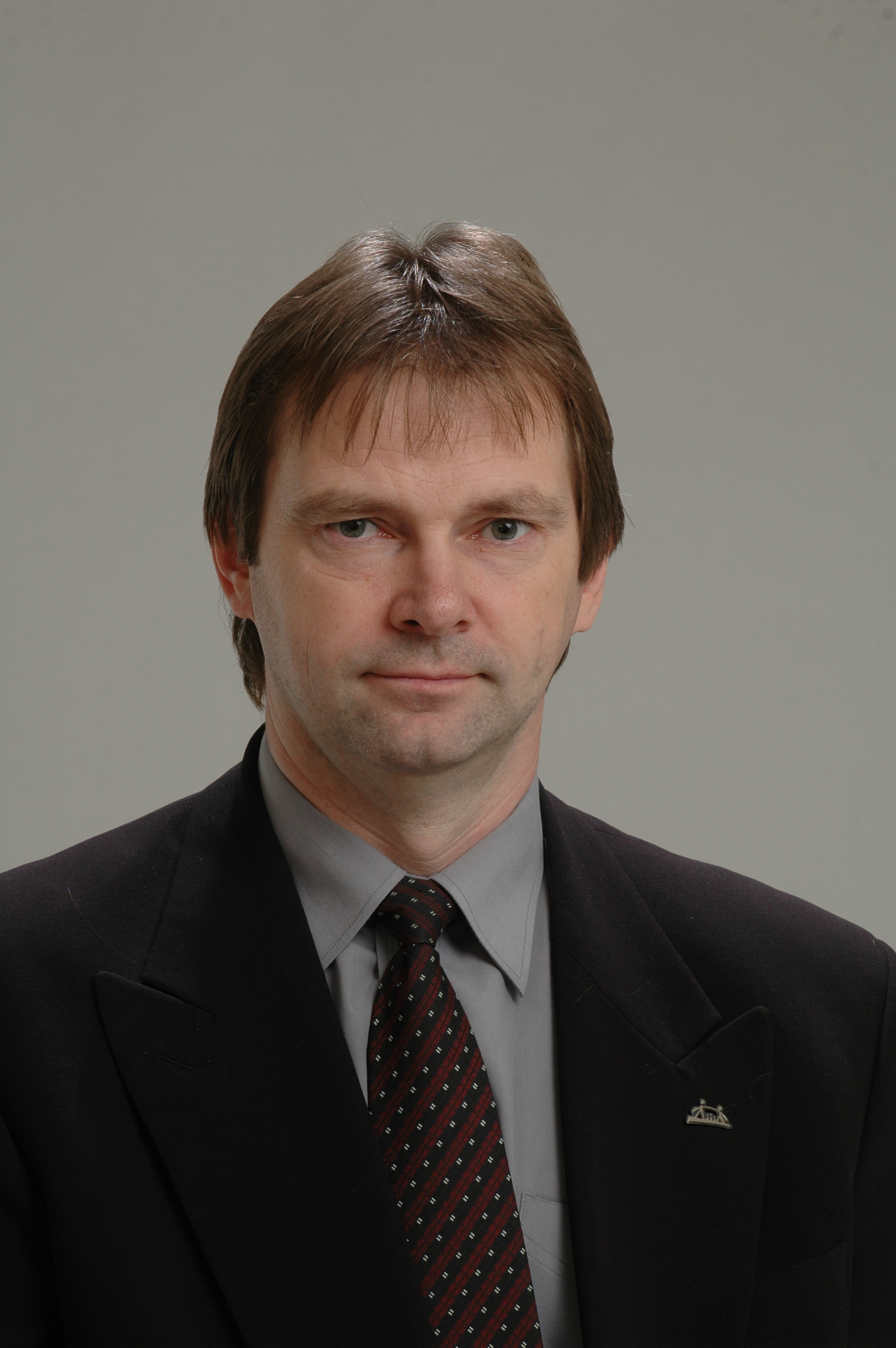
Jānis Eglītis

Jānis Eglītis (January 23, 1961 – May 6, 2013) was a Latvian politician and a Deputy of the 9th Saeima. He was a member of the People's Party.
