= Jānis Dukšinskis =

Latvian politician

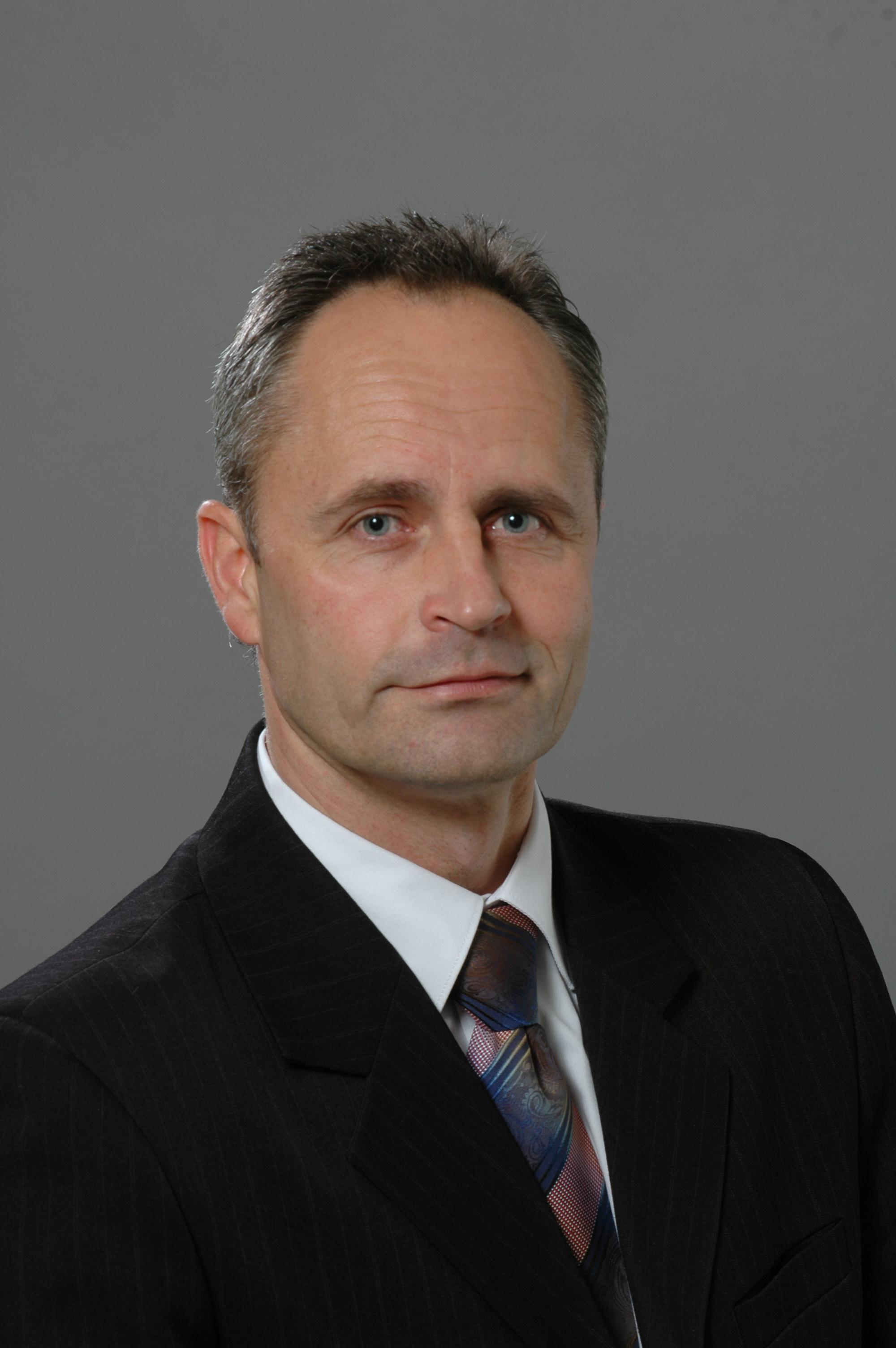
Jānis Dukšinskis

Jānis Dukšinskis (born 8 June 1963, Daugavpils) is a Latvian politician. He is a member of the LPP/LC and a deputy of the 9th Saeima (Latvian Parliament). He began his current term in parliament on November 7, 2006. He is currently a member of the Daugavpils City Council.
