= Linda Mūrniece =

Latvian politician and journalist

Linda Mūrniece-Freiberga
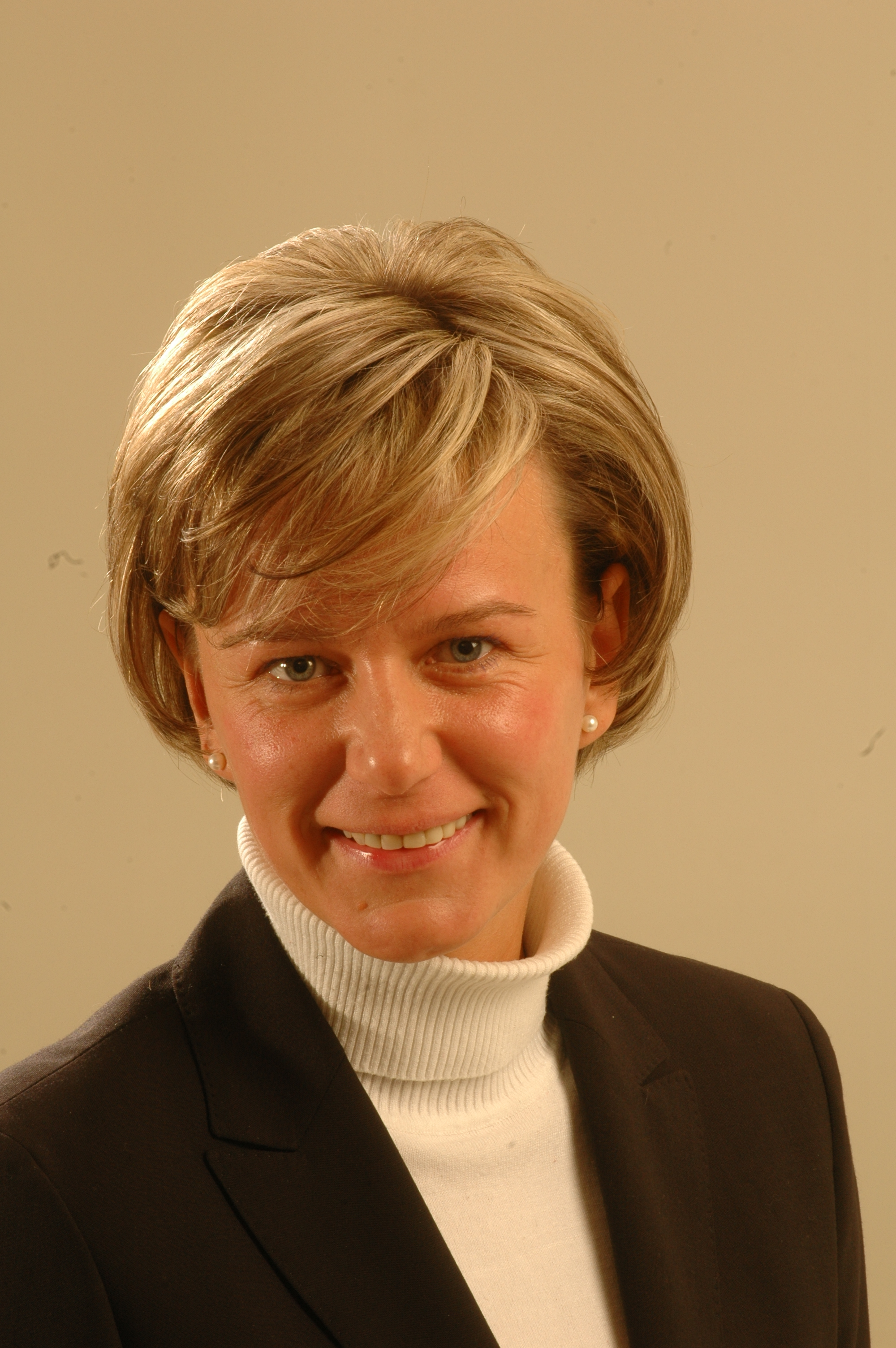

Minister for the Interior of Latvia
- In office 12 March 2009 – 6 June 2011
- Prime Minister: Valdis Dombrovskis
- Preceded by: Mareks Segliņš
- Succeeded by: Rihards Kozlovskis

Minister for Defence of Latvia
- In office 5 January 2006 – 7 April 2006
- Prime Minister: Aigars Kalvītis
- Preceded by: Einars Repše
- Succeeded by: Atis Slakteris

Personal details
- Born: 28 January 1970 (age 56) Dobele, Latvian SSR
- Party: Unity (2011—)
- Other political affiliations: New Era Party (2002-2011)
- Spouse(s): Raimonds Mūrnieks (-2011, divorced); Hosams Abu Meri (2012-2017, divorced)
- Education: University of Latvia
- Profession: Journalist

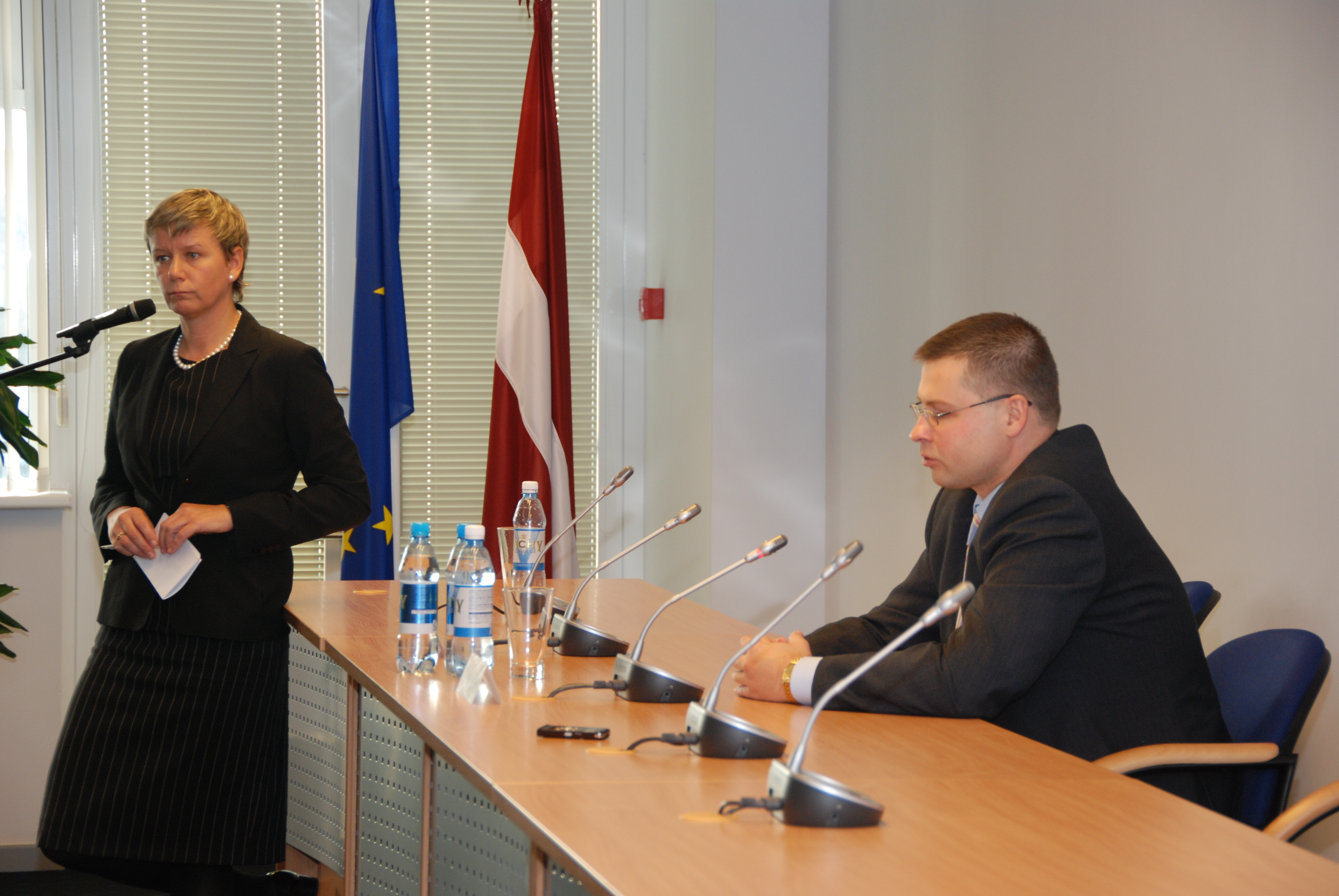
Linda Mūrniece with Valdis Dombrovskis

Linda Mūrniece (née Linda Mūrniece; born 28 January 1970 in Dobele) is a Latvian politician and journalist. She is a member of Unity, and has served as both the Minister for the Interior as well as the Minister for Defence of Latvia.

In 2002 Mūrniece was elected as a member of the eighth Saeima. She has been the Secretary of Parliament for both the Ministry for the Interior and the Ministry of Defence. After the resignation of Einars Repše as the Minister for Defence, Mūrniece took the office on 5 January 2006 and served until 7 April 2006 when the New Era Party resigned from the government.

Mūrniece was also elected as a member of the ninth Saeima in 2006. On 12 March 2009 Mūrniece became the Minister for the Interior. After the October 2010 election Mūrniece continued her work as the Minister. In early 2011, after a burglary by four policeman in Jēkabpils during which another policeman was shot, Mūrniece resigned.

She was married to Unity member of the Saeima Hosams Abu Meri.
