= Inta Ezergailis =

American-Latvian historian (1932–2005)

Inta Miške Ezergailis (11 September 1932 in Riga, Latvia – 1 January 2005, in Ithaca, New York), was a Latvian-American professor emerita of German literature at Cornell University from 1969 to 1999, specializing in Thomas Mann and contemporary women writers. In 1965, she began graduate study at Cornell University and after earning her doctorate in 1969, she was appointed to the Cornell faculty as an assistant professor of German literature.

In addition to books, she published numerous articles, in English and Latvian, in scholarly and intellectual periodicals.

During the last decade of her life, she turned from academic prose to poetry. Posthumously, her poems have been published by Ulysses House in four volumes: Inta's poems I, II, and III, Alzheimer's Poems, the Vanishing of a Mother. The last volume is devoted to her mother, who died of dementia.

She was married to Andrew Ezergailis.

== Books ==
- Male and Female: An Approach to Thomas Mann's Dialectic (1975)
- Woman Writers - The Divided Self (1982). (Study of Christa Wolf, Ingeborg Bachmann, Doris Lessing, Erica Jong, Karin Struck, Francine du Plessix Gray, and others.)
- Thomas Mann, Critical Essays on Thomas Mann (1988)
- Nostalgia and Beyond: Eleven Latvian Women Writers (1998).
