= Mareks Segliņš =

Latvian politician

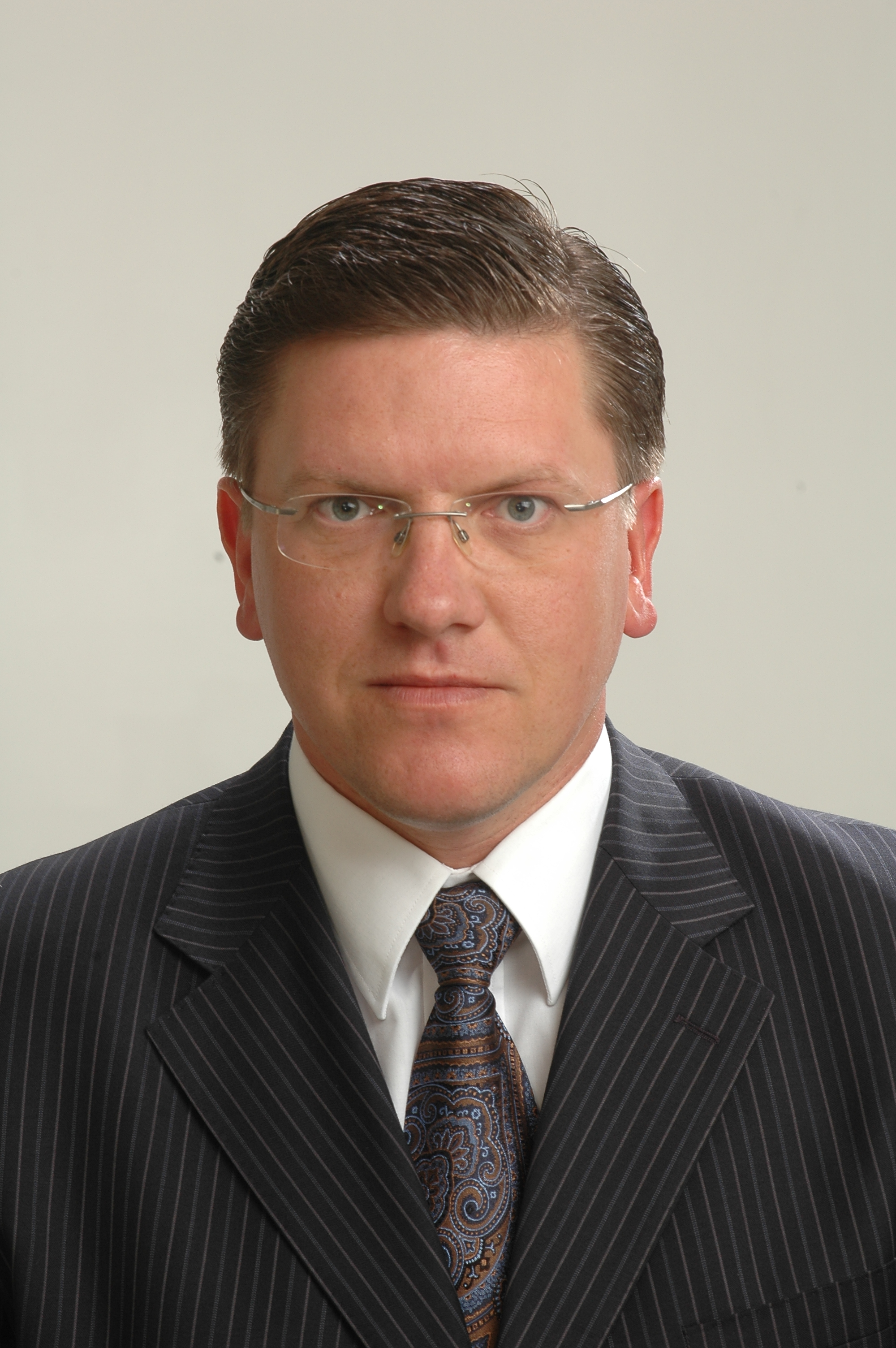

Minister of the Interior of Latvia
- In office 16 July 1999 – 30 September 2002
- Prime Minister: Andris Šķēle; Andris Bērziņš
- Preceded by: Roberts Jurdžs
- Succeeded by: Māris Gulbis

Minister of Justice of Latvia
- In office 12 March 2009 – 17 March 2010
- Prime Minister: Valdis Dombrovskis
- Preceded by: Gaidis Bērziņš
- Succeeded by: Aigars Štokenbergs

Personal details
- Born: 4 July 1970 (age 56) Aizpute, Latvian SSR
- Party: People's Party
- Other political affiliations: Liepāja Party
- Education: University of Latvia
- Profession: Lawyer

Mareks Segliņš (born 4 July 1970 in Aizpute, Latvian SSR) is a Latvian politician of People's Party and a lawyer. He is the former Minister of Justice of Latvia, as well as former Minister of the Interior of Latvia.

He graduated from Faculty of Law of University of Latvia in 1993 and afterwards worked in prosecutor's office and court of Liepāja city. In 1994–1998 he worked in law office Pomerancis un Kreicis. In 1998 he was elected to the 7th Saeima and was interior minister firstly in Andris Šķēle's and later in Andris Bērziņš' cabinet in 1999–2002. He was elected to the 8th Saeima and was head of the parliamentarian Law committee, a position he retained after being re-elected to the 9th Saeima, when he also became head of parliamentarian National security committee. In 2007 he became interior minister in Ivars Godmanis' cabinet.

He was widely cited in newspapers on February 20, 2008, following a 34-year-old English man being jailed in Riga for urinating on the historic Freedom Monument. Seglins described the British people who cause trouble in Latvia when inebriated, typically on weekends away for parties such as stag nights, as "pigs". He also said "These people think it is a tradition to defile our monument. They are pigs, those British. A piggy nation." Despite this, drunken individuals from multiple nations have urinated on the monument.

In March 2009, Seglins became the minister of justice in Valdis Dombrovskis' cabinet. He stepped down in 2010, when his party left the cabinet.
