= Inta Feldmane =

Latvian politician (born 1959)

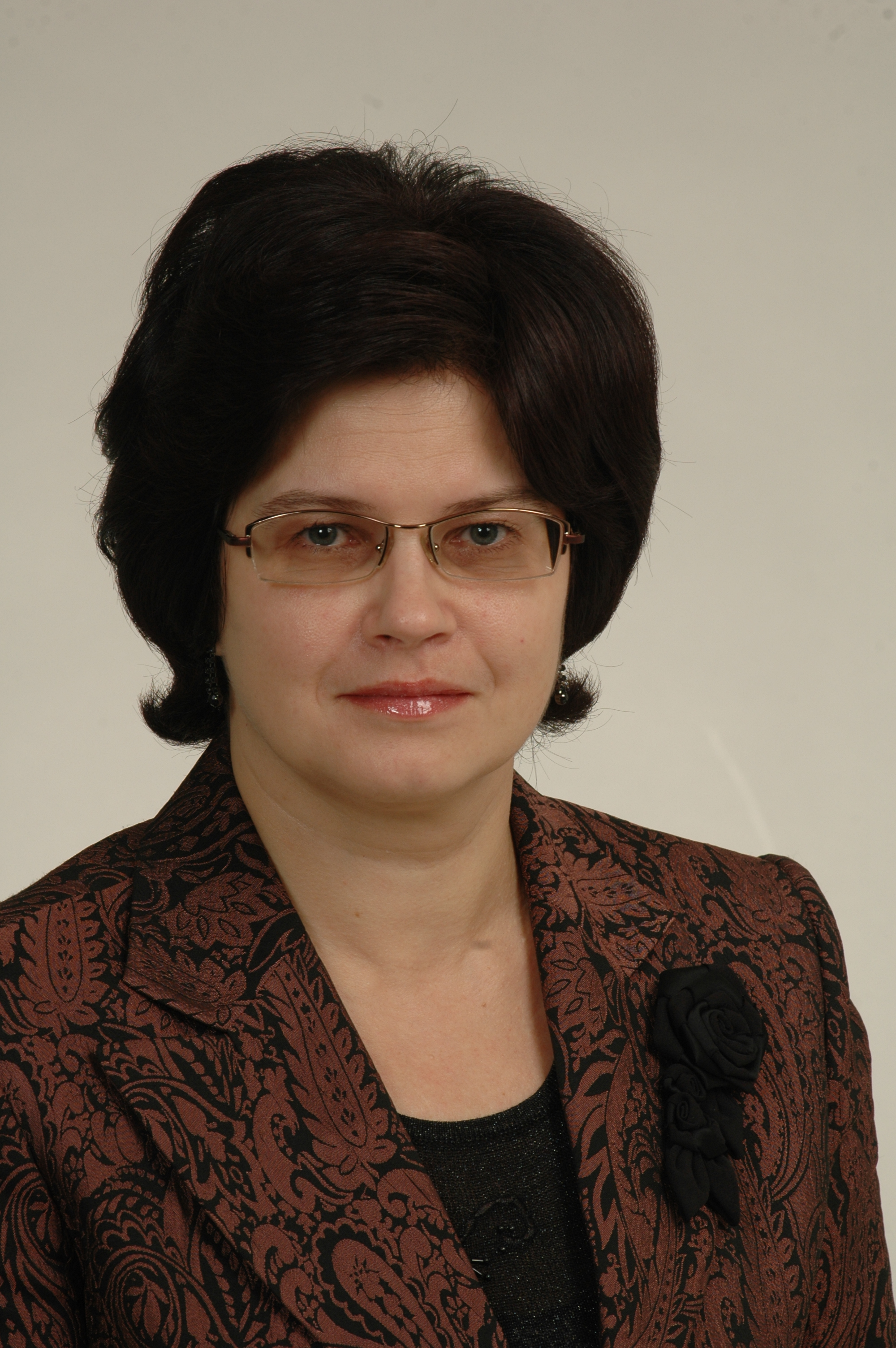
Inta Feldmane

Inta Feldmane (born 1959) is a Latvian politician. She is a member of the LPP/LC and a deputy of the 9th Saeima (Latvian Parliament). She began her current term in parliament on November 16, 2006.
