= Uldis Briedis =

Latvian politician

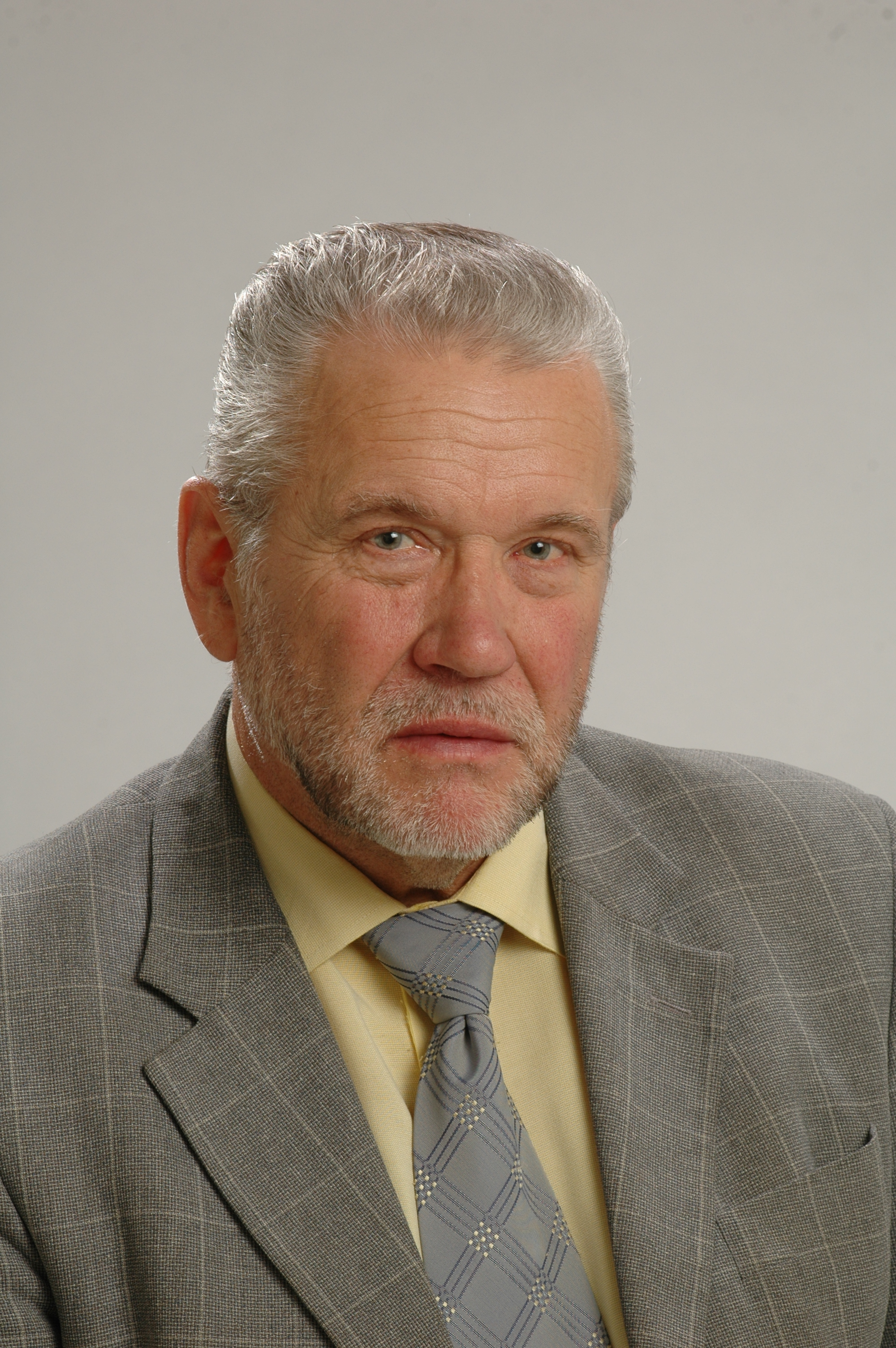

Uldis Briedis (born 1942) is a Latvian politician and a former Deputy of the Saeima. He was a member of the People's Party.
