= Vaira Paegle =

Latvian politician (1942–2019)

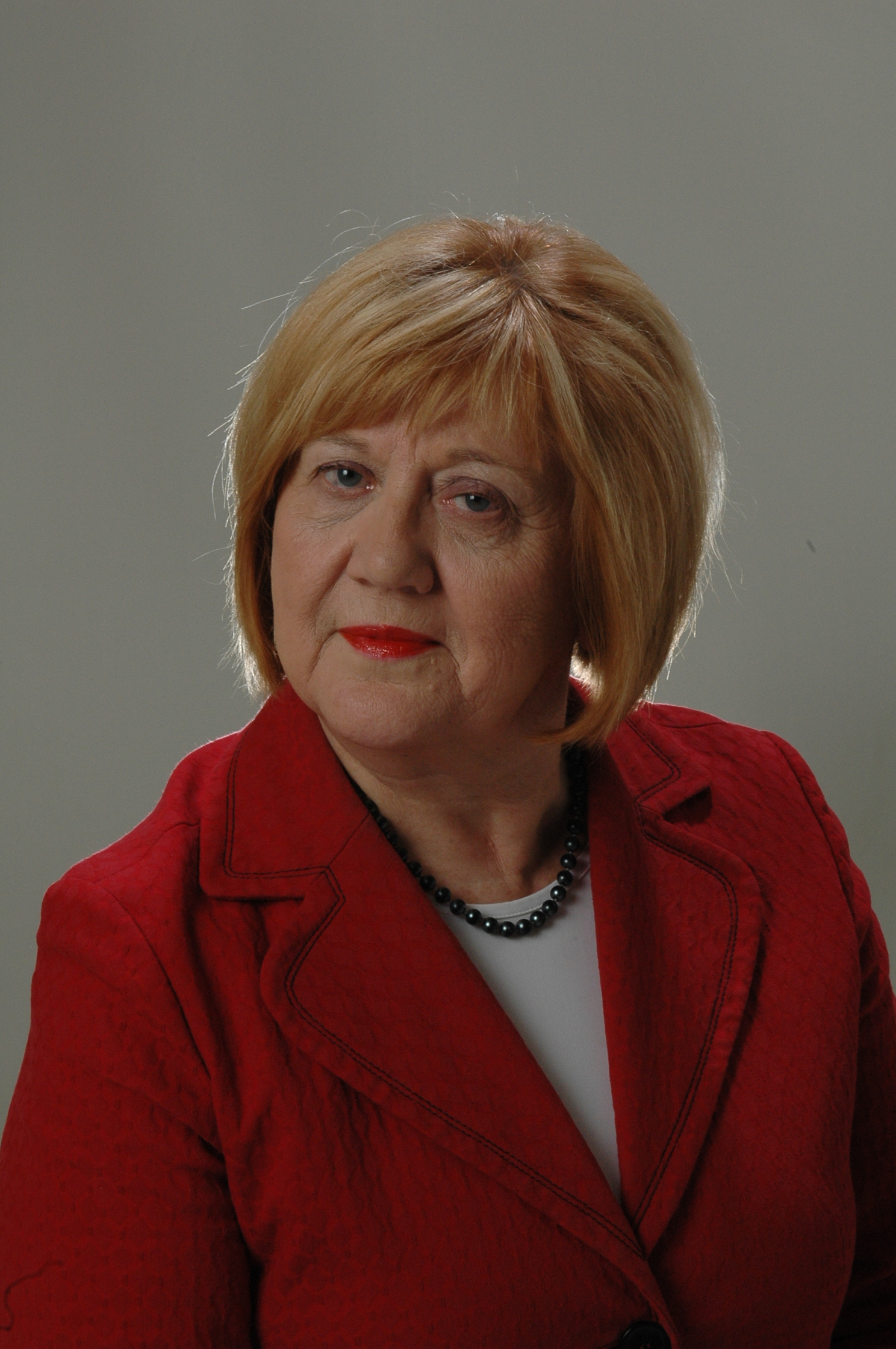

Deputy of the Saeima
- In office 1998–2010

Personal details
- Born: July 6, 1942 Riga, Reichskommissariat Ostland (Now Latvia)
- Died: June 14, 2019 (aged 76) West Hartford, Connecticut, United States
- Party: People's Party (1998–2009); Civic Union (2010)
- Education: Tufts University; University of New Hampshire

Vaira Paegle (July 6, 1942 – June 14, 2019) was a Latvian politician. She was a Deputy of the Saeima and a member of the People's Party, later of the Civic Union.

== Biography ==
Paegle was born in Riga, Latvia during the Nazi occupation. In 1944, she and her family left Latvia and spent the next seven years in Displaced Persons camps in the British Zone, Germany. In 1951, she and her family immigrated to the United States, living in Concord, New Hampshire.

Paegle graduated from Tufts University in 1964 with a Bachelor of Arts and received her master's degree from the University of New Hampshire. She married Viesturs Paegle in 1968 and the couple moved to Connecticut.

She became active in public service. Paegle worked for the Connecticut Department of Social Services until she retired in 1997. She was also the first woman president of the World Federation of Free Latvians.

She joined the People's Party in Latvia and began to run in Parliamentary elections. Paegle served for three terms and was elected Chair of the Foreign Relations Committee and later the Chair of the European Affairs Committee. Paegle also founded the Women's Caucus in the Latvian Parliament. In 1998, she was a candidate for the People's Party in the Latvian elections.

She joined the People's Party in Latvia and began to run in Parliamentary elections. Paegle served for three terms and was elected Chair of the Foreign Relations Committee and later the Chair of the European Affairs Committee. Paegle also founded the Women's Caucus in the Latvian Parliament. In 1998, she was a candidate for the People's Party in the Latvian elections.
