= Latvia's First Party =

Latvian political party

Latvia's First Party Latvijas Pirmā Partija
- Leader: Joint leadership of Ēriks Jēkabsons and Ainārs Šlesers.
- Founded: 25 May 2002
- Dissolved: 25 August 2007
- Split from: New Christian Party
- Succeeded by: Latvia's First Party/Latvian Way
- Headquarters: Riga
- Ideology: Conservatism; Christian democracy Euroscepticism
- Political position: Right-wing
- Colours: Purple, green

Website
- lpp.lv

The Latvia's First Party (Latvian: Latvijas Pirmā Partija) was a socially conservative, Christian-democratic right-wing political party in Latvia. It merged with Latvian Way to form Latvia's First Party/Latvian Way in 2007.

It was founded on 25 May 2002, led by Ēriks Jēkabsons and Ainārs Šlesers. The party included a number of priests from all the major branches of Christianity in Latvia (Lutheran, Catholic, Orthodox and Baptist) as well as members of Jaunā Paaudze (New Generation), a charismatic church. As a result, it was informally nicknamed "the party of priests" or the "pastors' party".

Using populist promises and support from religious organisations, it won 9.5% of the popular vote and 10 out of 100 seats in the Saeima after the elections of October 5, 2002 and joined all the coalition governments since that time until its dissolution. In the 2006 elections, it ran together with Latvian Way; the bloc took 8.58% but also won 10 seats in parliament. The parties merged in the following years.

== Scandals ==
The first chairman of the party, Ēriks Jēkabsons, resigned as Minister of the Interior. Later, due to various disagreements about the direction that the party was taking, he left the party itself and became an independent MP.

Following the 2005 municipal election, a Jūrmala businessman Germans Milušs attempted to bribe the members of city council to ensure the election of Juris Hlevickis, a First Party member, as Jūrmala mayor. Hlevickis fell one vote short of becoming the mayor and, in 2007, both Milušs and Hlevickis were convicted and received prison sentences.

During the bribery attempt, Milušs's phone conversations were wiretapped by Latvian police. The wiretaps contain cryptic conversations between Milušs and Ainārs Šlesers, which were leaked to national TV in 2006. This resulted in the resignation of Šlesers as the Minister of Transportation on March 17, 2006. Šlesers was not however charged or convicted of bribery and returned to the position of the Minister of Transportation in November 2006.
