= Russian language in Latvia =

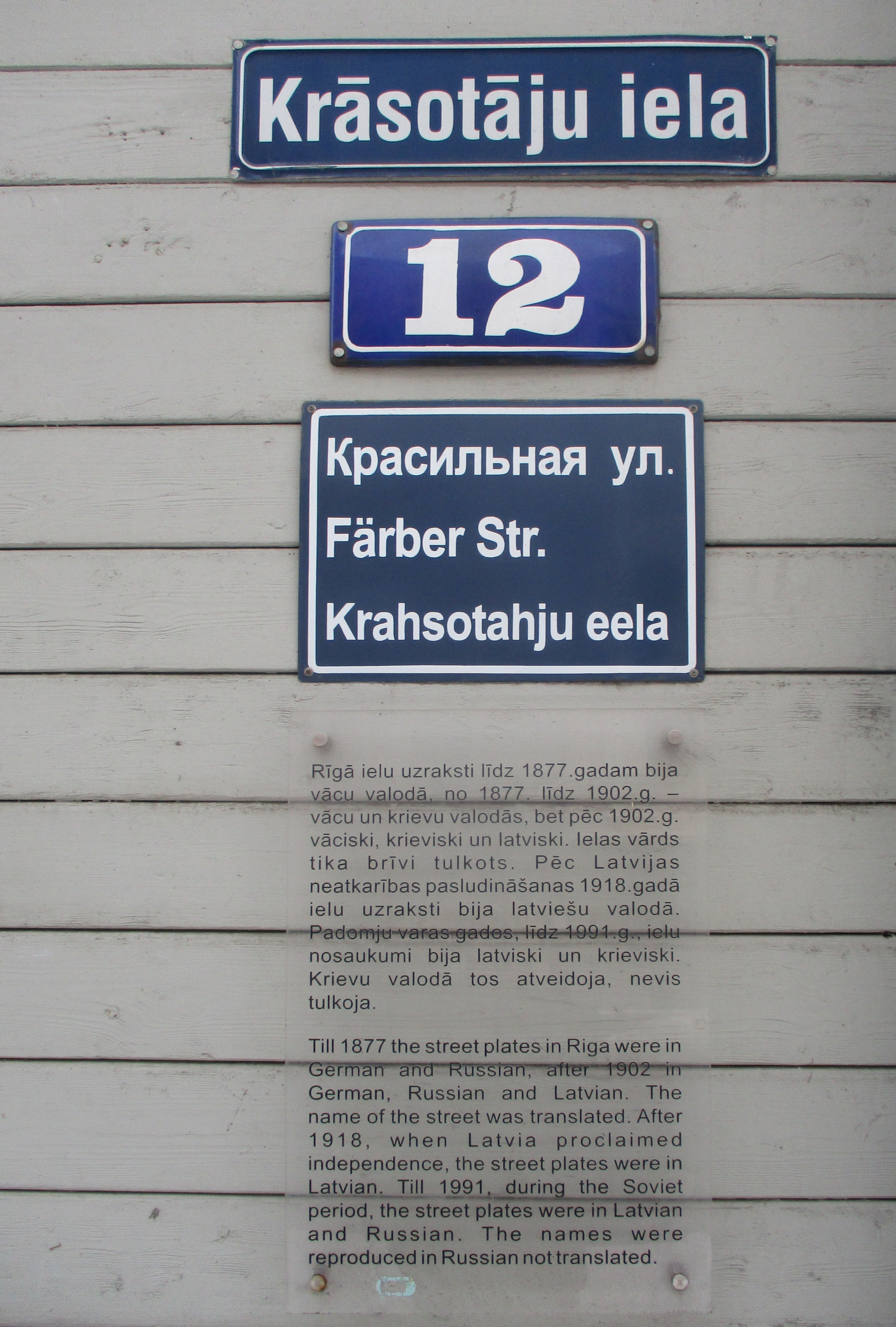
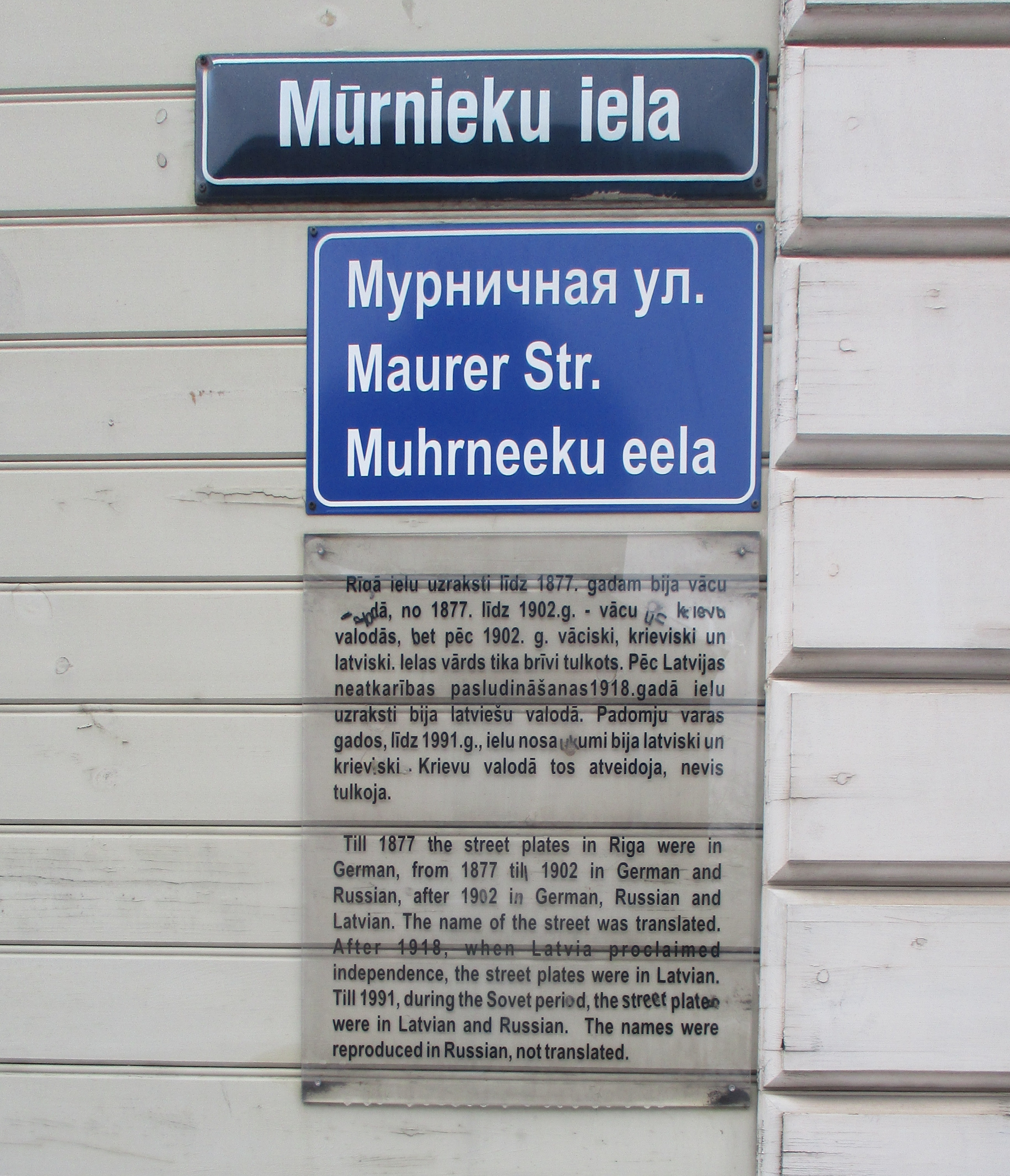
Modern monolingual street plates for Krāsotāji Street and Mūrnieki Street in Riga and decorative trilingual plates with the historical street names, including in Russian (Красильная улица and Мурничная улица) that were in use from 1877 to 1918.

The Russian language is spoken by a significant minority in Latvia. According to the External Migration Survey in 2017, it was the native language of 36% of the population, whereas 25.4% of the population were ethnic Russians.

== History and distribution ==
=== Early influence ===
The modern Latvian language has retained a number of loanwords borrowed from Old East Slavic during the early contacts between the East Slavic and Baltic people, such as kalps ("farmhand"; from холпь – "serf, slave"), grāmata ("book"; from грамота – "alphabet, writing, literacy"), baznīca ("church"; from божница – "church, chapel"), modrs ("vigilant, watchful, alert"; мѫдръ – "wise"), sods ("punishment"; from судъ) and strādāt ("to work"; from страдати).

=== In the Governorate of Livonia (1721–1918) and Courland (1795–1918) ===
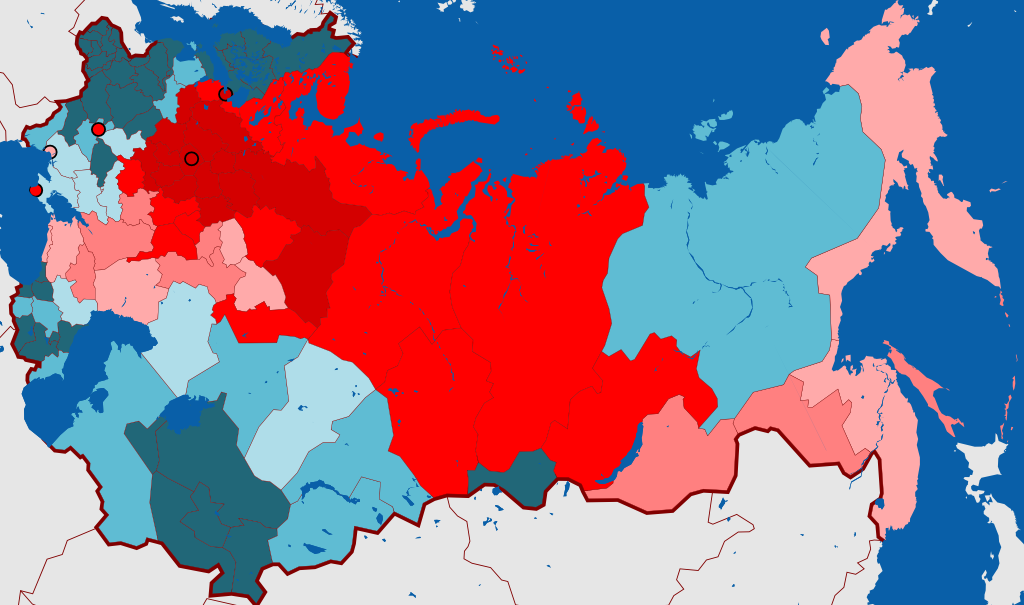
Speakers of "Great Russian" in the Russian Empire by region and state according to the 1897 Imperial Russian Census. Governorate of Courland and Governorate of Livonia are in the upper left corner. >90% 70—89% 50—69% 30—49% 15—29% 5—14% <5%

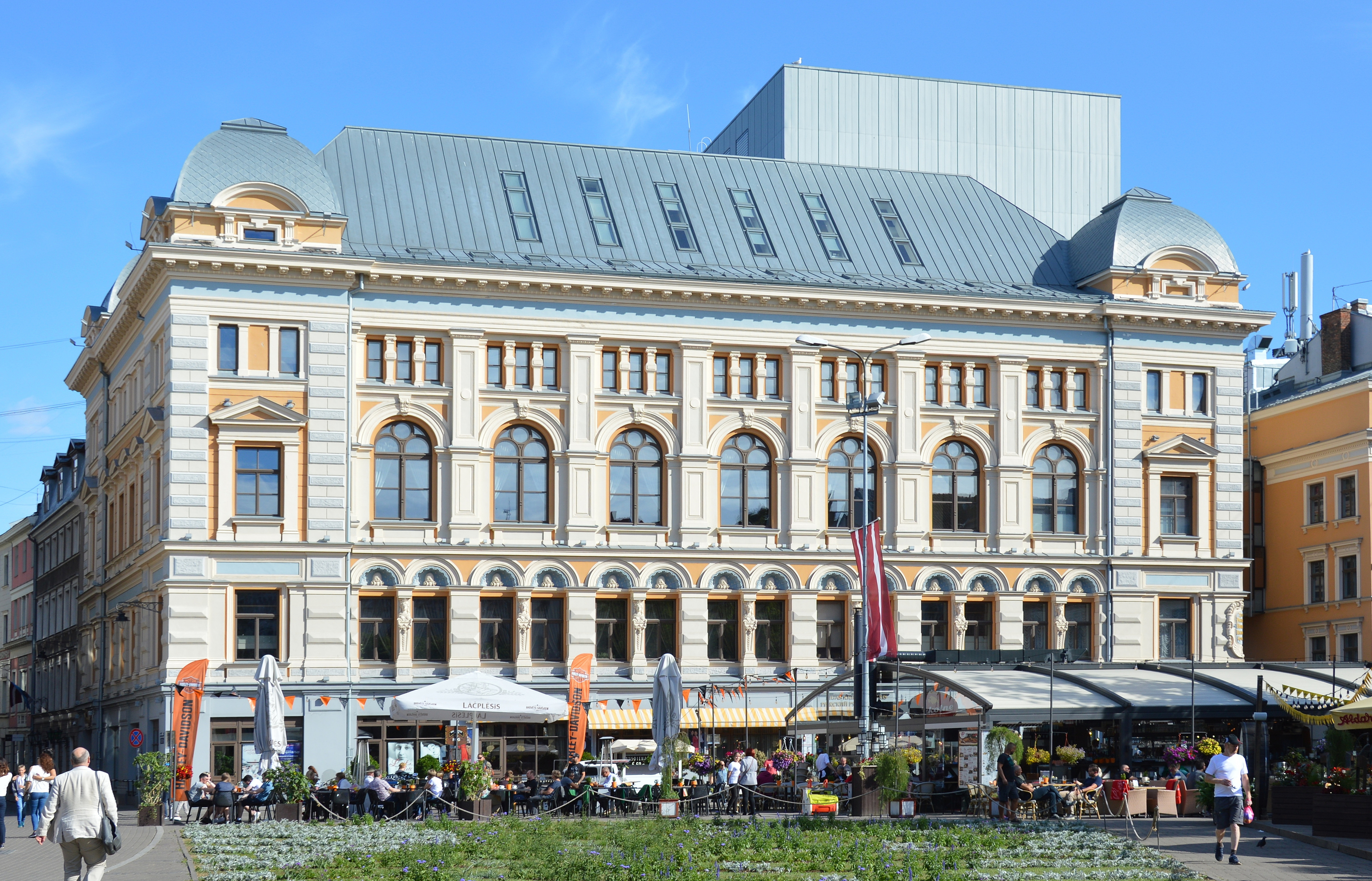
Mikhail Chekhov Riga Russian Theatre founded in 1883

On September 14, 1885, an ukaz was signed by Alexander III setting the mandatory use of Russian for Baltic governorate officials. In 1889, it was extended to apply to official proceedings of the Baltic municipal governments as well. By the beginning of the 1890s, Russian was enforced as the language of instruction in Baltic governorate schools.

According to the 1897 Imperial Russian Census, there were 25,630 (3.8%) speakers of "Great Russian" in the Governorate of Courland and 68,124 (5.2%) speakers of "Great Russian" in the Governorate of Livonia, making Russian speakers the 4th largest linguistic group in each of the governorates.

=== In independent Latvia (1918–1940) ===
In the 1925 census, Russians were reported as the largest ethnic minority (10.6%) and Russian was spoken as the family language by 14% of inhabitants. A small percentage of Russian speakers were not ethnic Russians and conversely, a small percentage of ethnic Russians used another language in the family, which was attributed to interethnic marriages, living in an area with another majority language and, in the case of Russian speakers, Russification policies of the Russian Empire.

As a legacy of Russian imperial rule from the 18th to early 20th century, schools with instruction in Latvian were far less prestigious among Latvia's ethnic minorities than minority schools with instruction in Russian. For example, in the 1922/23 academic year only 18.3% of pupils in Russian schools were ethnically Russian, while 55.7% were Jews, 10.4% were Latvians and 7.4% were Poles.

In the 1930 census, Russian was reported as a family language by 13% of inhabitants. In 1940, 216 of 1521 schools in Latvia had Russian as the language of instruction and trilingualism in Latvian, German and Russian among the population was common.

=== In Latvian SSR ===
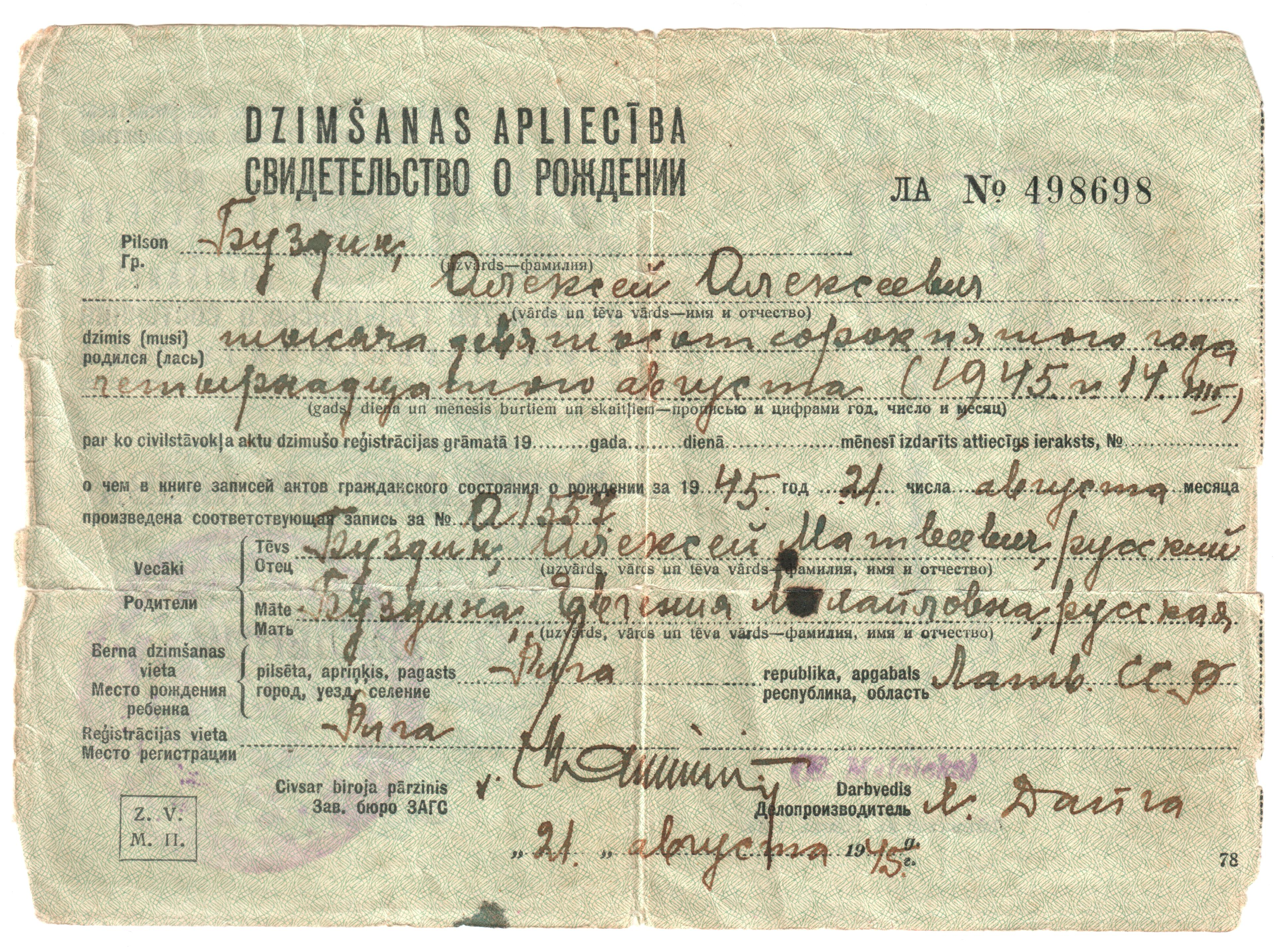
A bilingual (Latvian-Russian) birth certificate form issued in Riga in 1945, after the Soviet re-occupation of Latvia in 1944, filled out only in Russian

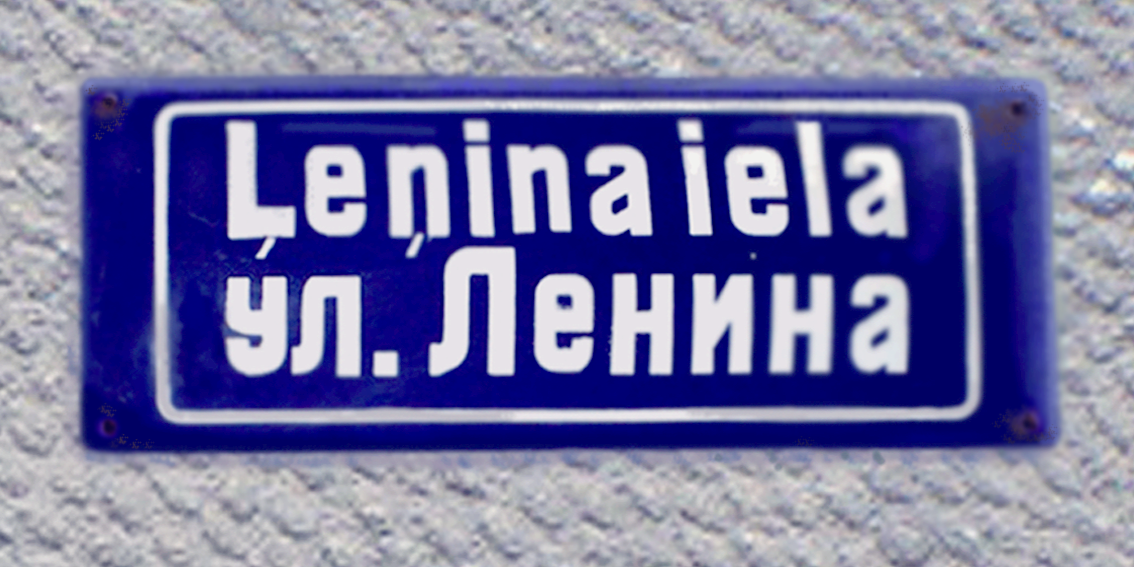
A bilingual (Latvian-Russian) Soviet era street name sign for Lenin Street (Latvian: Ļeņina iela, Russian: ул. Ленина), the Soviet name for Riga's central Brīvības iela from 1950 to 1991, at the Museum of the Occupation of Latvia

==== 1944–1957 ====
The number of native Russian speakers increased sharply after the Soviet re-occupation in 1944 to fill the gaps in the workforce created by World War II, mass deportations, execution and emigration. New, previously virtually unknown groups such as Russian-speaking Ukrainians were also introduced.

Russian became the language of State business, and administrative positions were largely filled by ethnic Russians. In addition to that, Russian served as the lingua franca among the increasingly urbanized non-Russian ethnic groups, making cities major centres for the use of Russian language and functional bilingualism in Russian a minimum necessity for the local population.

Soviet policies promoted bilingualism for all Soviet citizens, but the bilingualism that resulted from official dogma has often been said to be unilateral. Non-Russian nationalities acquired Russian as a second (or often a first) language, while Russians remained overwhelmingly monolingual. Statistics for bilingualism in the Latvian SSR are particularly telling in this regard.

— Lenore Grenoble, Language Policy in the Soviet Union (2003)

In an attempt to partially reverse the previous Soviet Russification policies and give the Latvian language a more equal position to the Russian language, the Latvian national communist faction within the Communist Party of Latvia passed a bill in 1957 that made the knowledge of both Latvian and Russian obligatory for all Communist Party employees, government functionaries and service sector staff. The law included a 2-year deadline for gaining proficiency in both languages.

==== 1958–1970 ====
In 1958, as the two-year deadline for the bill was approaching, the Communist Party of the Soviet Union set out to enact an education reform, a component of which, the so-called Thesis 19, would give parents in all of the Soviet Republics, with the exception of Russian SSR, a choice for their children in public schools to study either the language of the republic's titular nation (in this case Latvian) or Russian, as well as one foreign language, in contrast to the previous education system, where it was mandatory for schoolchildren to learn all three languages.

The reform was strongly opposed by both the faction of Latvian national communists and the Latvian public who believed that, in reality, it would allow Russians to not learn Latvian, while still forcing Latvians to learn Russian, and perceived the reform as linguistic Russification. Deputy Education Minister Erna Purvinska insisted that proficiency in both Latvian and Russian should be regarded with equal importance.

Due to widespread opposition from other republics as well, the Supreme Soviet of the Soviet Union was not able to implement Thesis 19 as an All-Union law and each republic was allowed to decide on it individually. However, in the end, Latvia was only one of two of the 12 Soviet Republics that did not yield to the increasing pressure and excluded the contents of Thesis 19 from its ratified statutes. This led to the eventual purge of the Latvian national communists from Communist Party ranks between 1959 and 1962, during which as many as 2,000 party officials, including all the native Latvians in senior positions, were demoted or removed. A month after the removal of the Latvian National Communist leader Eduards Berklavs, All-Union legislation was implemented in Latvia by Arvīds Pelše.

In an attempt to further widen the use of Russian and reverse the work of the national communists, a bilingual school system was established in Latvia, with parallel classes being taught in both Russian and Latvian. The number of such schools increased dramatically, including regions where the Russian population was minimal, and by July of 1963 there were already 240 such bilingual schools.

The effect of the reform was the gradual decline in the number of assigned hours for learning Latvian in Russian schools and the increase of hours allocated for learning Russian in Latvian schools. In 1964–1965, the total weekly average of Latvian language classes and Russian language and literature classes in Latvian schools across all grades was reported to be 38.5 and 72.5 hours respectively, in comparison with 79 hours being devoted to Russian language and 26 hours being devoted to Latvian language and literature in Russian schools. The reform has been attributed to the persistence of poor Latvian language knowledge among Russians living in Latvia and the increasing language gap between Latvians and Russians.

==== 1970–1991 ====
In 1970, Russian was spoken as the native language by 36% of inhabitants of the Latvian SSR, including 6% of the total population who were not ethnic Russians, and fluently as a second language by a further 31% of inhabitants (including 47% Latvians), while only 18% Russians reported having any knowledge of Latvian. It was even more disproportionate among the Latvian SSR's non-Russians and non-Latvians: 152,897 claimed Russian as their first language, in comparison with only 28,444 who claimed Latvian as their first language.

In 1972, the Letter of 17 Latvian communists was smuggled outside the Latvian SSR and circulated in the Western world, accusing Communist Party of the Soviet Union of "Great Russian chauvinism" and "progressive Russification of all life in Latvia". It detailed the high influx of Russians, Belarusians and Ukrainians into the republic resulting in several large companies having almost no Latvian employees and people in managerial positions that do not possess any understanding of Latvian in companies with a majority of Latvian workers. The letter also stressed the fact that approximately 65% of doctors working in municipal heath institutions did not speak Latvian, which often resulted in serious medical errors. Furthermore, it pointed out how almost two-thirds of radio and television broadcasts and around half of the published periodical literature in Latvia was already fully in Russian. Works of Latvian authors and school textbooks in Latvian were often not published due to an alleged lack of paper, whereas works of Russian authors and school textbooks in Russians were published. Even many collectives where Latvians formed the majority often yielded to the demands of their Russian-speaking members to conduct the meetings in Russian out of fear of being accused of nationalism. Middle, tertiary and higher education institutions had begun transitioning to Russian as the language of instruction, whereas many of the officials that had objected to these policies had been removed from their posts.

A bilingual (Latvian-Russian) 1980 identity card of a people's deputy of Supreme Soviet of the Latvian Soviet Socialist Republic

In 1989, Russian was the native language to 42% of inhabitants, including 8% of the population who were non-Russians, while 39% of inhabitants spoke it fluently as a second language. Non-Russian ethnic minorities had been particularly susceptible to linguistic Russification as, for example, the percentage of Belarusians who reported Belarusian as their native language had decreased from 42.6% in 1959 to 32% in 1989, while Poles with Polish as their native language had dropped from 55.3% to 27.3%. 95% of Belarusians and 88% of Poles had proficiency in Russian, but only 18% and 37% had Latvian knowledge. The only ethnic minority with a higher proficiency of Latvian (64%) than Russian (48%) were the Lithuanians.

From 1989 to 1990 an average of 47.5% of pupils had enrolled in schools with Russian as the language of tuition, and the number was even higher (69.3%) in urban centres, meaning that not only an overwhelming majority of non-Latvians but also some Latvians had enrolled in Russian-language schools. During the Perestroika period from 1986 to 1990, the perception of separate Latvian and Russian language schools had shifted and Russian language schools began to be publicly referred to as "symbols of occupation". Policy options of reversing the decades-long Russification were openly discussed.

A January 12, 1989 article of the newspaper Jūrmala reported that the vast majority of Latvians in Riga would begin conversations with strangers in Russian, while only 17% would do so in Latvian. Similarly, 96% of Russians and 85% of people of other groups were also reported as beginning the conversation with strangers in Russian, resulting in the general isolation of Russians living in Latvian cities and an establishment of relatively separate communities that did not integrate with the local population.

=== In independent Latvia (1990–present) ===
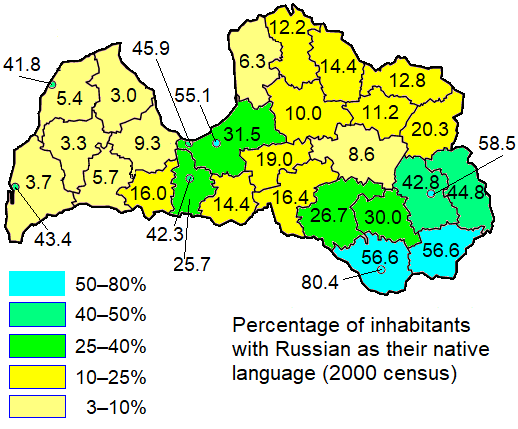
Percentage of Russian speakers in different regions of Latvia, 2000 census

Percentage of Russian speakers in different regions of Latvia, 2011 census

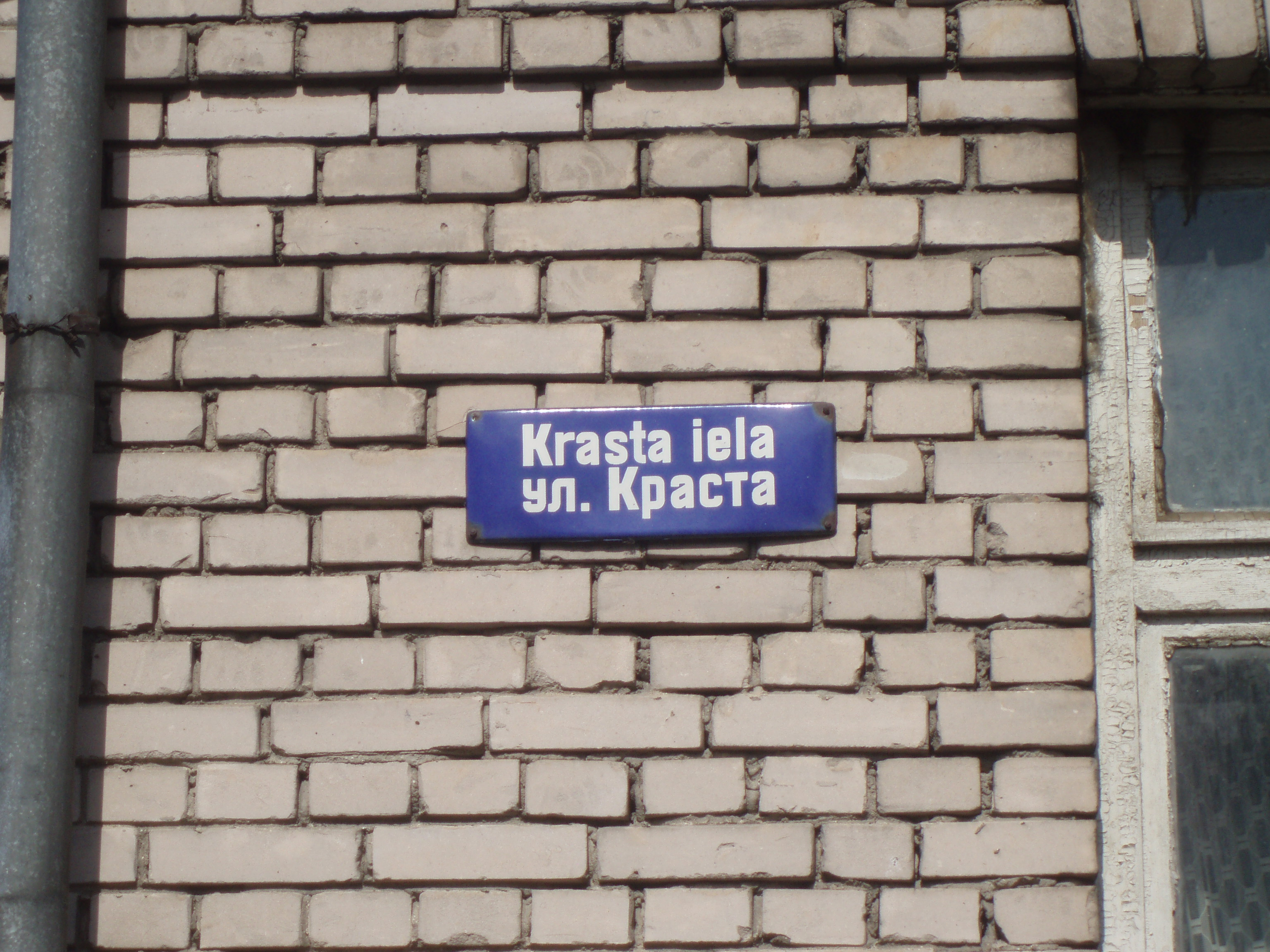
A bilingual (Latvian-Russian) Soviet era street sign for Krasta Street in Rēzekne, 2011

In 2000, Russian was spoken natively by 17.5% of inhabitants and by 23.7% as the second language. Among them, 73% of Belarusians, 68% of Ukrainians, 58% of Poles and 79% of Jews reported Russian as their native language. In the 2011 census, 37.2% reported Russian as the language they primarily speak at home. In the Latgale region, Russian was spoken at home by 30.3% of the population, but Zilupe Municipality was the municipality with the biggest percentage of Russian speakers (42.1%). In the capital, Riga Russian was spoken at home by 55.8% of inhabitants.

A 2012 research "Language situation in Latvia: 2004–2010" by the Latvian Language Agency reported that the overall proficiency of Russian as a second language was decreasing due to it losing its popularity among the youth, especially in areas with a very large Latvian majority. In a 2004 survey 73% of the respondents rated their Russian language skills as good, but in 2008 the overall proportion had decreased to 49%.

The number was even lower among young people (between 15 and 34 years of age), of whom 54% said they have a good command of Russian, 38% have a low command, and 8% have no knowledge of Russian. Nonetheless, the proportion of people knowing Russian (98%) was still higher than the proportion of people knowing Latvian (92%). Overall, 1% of the respondents with the native language of Latvian did not know Russian, and 8% of the respondents whose native language was Russian reported not having any knowledge of Latvian in return. The report also noted the increasingly explicit and disproportional demand for Russian language skills from the employers and linguistic discrimination of non-Russian-speaking candidates in the job market, especially in cases when Russian language skills were prioritised over professional qualifications.

The follow-up research "Language situation in Latvia: 2010–2015" pointed to the dysfunctional employment law, which allowed for the situation where the employees in almost all sectors, especially the service industry, were expected to have proficiency in Russian. The Head of the Latvian State Language Center Antons Kursītis named it one of the main reasons influencing youth emigration to other European countries.

In January 2018, Latvian State Language Center released an app Valodas draugs (Language Friend) for reporting suspected violations of the Latvian language law and praising companies for their friendly attitude towards the Latvian language. The app was criticized by Russian-speaking activists who claimed it instigates ethnic hatred and attempted to block it on Google Play Store.

On November 1, 2018, Saeima approved amendments to the employment law proposed by the National Alliance, stipulating that employers cannot request knowledge of foreign languages if the use of the said languages are not included in the employee's duties and cannot deny employees the right of using the state language. According to the authors, the amendments were mostly aimed towards employers requesting the Russian language, even when the company has no dealings with foreign clients.

==== 2012 constitutional referendum ====
Results of the 2012 Latvian constitutional referendum to adopt Russian as the second official language by municipality.: IN FAVOUR 100.0%—90.0% 89.9%—80.0% 79.9%—70.0% 69.9%—60.0% 59.9%—50.0% / AGAINST 50.0%—59.9% 60.0%—69.9% 70.0%—79.9% 80.0%—89.9% 90.0%—100.0%

On September 9, 2011, NGO "Native Language" submitted a petition to the Central Election Commission signed by 12,516 people on making Russian the second state language in Latvia. From November 1 to November 30, 2011, the Central Election Commission held an official signature gathering, during which 187,378 of the required 154,379 signatures were collected and the proposal was sent to Saeima.

The Harmony Centre leader and Mayor of Riga Nils Ušakovs publicly declared that he had signed the petition but as a "private citizen". After that, other deputies, local government representatives and public officials from Harmony Centre began to sign it as well, including MP Nikolai Kabanov who was later issued a written warning by the Saeima Mandate, Ethics and Submissions Committee for violating the deputy's solemn vow (oath), in which Kabanov swore to strengthen the Latvian language as the only official language. Harmony MP Andrejs Klementjevs refused to formulate his party association's official position, stating that Harmony Centre had distanced itself from the matter, however they would examine the proposal carefully should it reach the parliament.

On December 22, 2011, deputies from Harmony walked out of the meeting before the vote, in which the Saeima rejected the proposal. This forced a constitutional referendum that was held on February 18, 2012. According to the Central Election Commission, 74.8% (821,722) voted against, 24.9% (273,347) voted for and the voter turnout was 70.37%. The next day, Ministry of Foreign Affairs of Russia announced that "the outcome of the referendum is far from reflecting the true mood in Latvia." pointing to around 319,000 non-citizens that could not participate in the referendum due to their status.

The former presidents of Latvia Guntis Ulmanis, Vaira Vīķe-Freiberga and Valdis Zatlers, leaders of the Latvian diaspora organizations (head of the World Federation of Free Latvians Jānis Kukainis, chair of the American Latvian Association Juris Mežinskis, chair of the Latvian Association of South America and the Caribbean Daina Gūtmane; chair of the Latvian Congress of Russia Lauma Vlasova, chair of the Latvian Association of Australia and New Zealand Pēteris Strazds and chair of the Latvian National Federation in Canada Andris Ķesteris) and the leading coalition of Unity, Zatlers' Reform Party and the National Alliance all urged voters to participate in the referendum and vote against Russian as a second state language. The president at the time Andris Bērziņš initially advised people to ignore the vote gathering, dismissing it as a provocation, but when it came to a referendum also called voters not to support Russian as the second state language and said he would resign should the referendum succeed. Several notable Latvian Russians, including sculptor Gļebs Panteļejevs, stage director Marina Kosteņecka, and journalist Mihails Gruzdovs, as well as the President of Russian fraternity Fraternitas Arctica Dmitrijs Trofimovs also called for a 'no' vote.

== In education ==
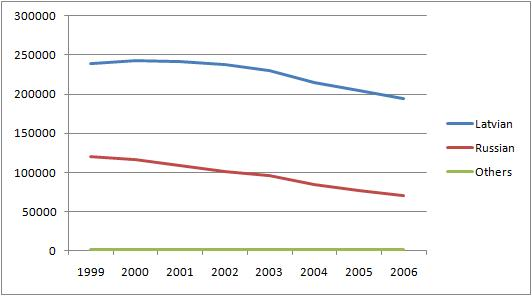
The number of students by the language of instruction in Latvian schools from 1999 to 2006

Russian is one of the seven minority languages alongside Polish, Hebrew, Ukrainian, Estonian, Lithuanian, and Belarusian national minority education programmes are provided in. In 2018 there were 94 schools implementing education programs in Russian and bilingually in Latvia.

In 2014, schoolchildren of Latvia demonstrated the highest overall results in Russian language (70.9%) of all the exit exams, a 6.75% increase in comparison with 2013.

In 2017, a total of 7% or 5,332 students studied in Russian in Latvia's state and private higher education institutions (around one third in private colleges and less than 1 percent in state higher institutions), the most being at the Transport and Telecommunication Institute, where the share of the students with Russian as the language of tuition reached 86% or 2,358. Other private higher education institutions with a notable percentage of people studying in Russian included Information Systems Management Institute with 53% students, Riga International School of Economics and Business Administration with 34% students, Riga Aeronautical Institute with 18% students, Baltic International Academy with 17% students, and University of Economics and Culture with 6% of all its students studying in Russian.

=== 2004 education reform ===
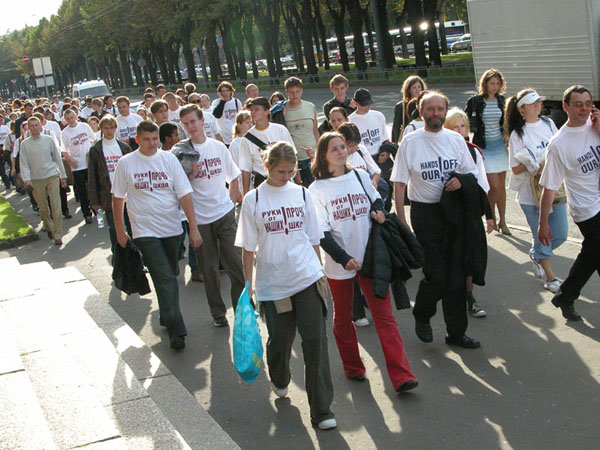
A 2003 protest march against the upcoming 2004 minority school transfer to bilingual education organised by the Headquarters for the Protection of Russian Schools

In 2004, the Ministry of Education and Science of Latvia transferred to bilingual education in minority schools (60% in Latvian and 40% in the minority language), causing a series of protests and opposition from Headquarters for the Protection of Russian Schools and Association in Support of Russian Language Schools.

Publications in the news media from that period showed that the use of Latvian among non-Latvians had become to be viewed sharply negative, however, after a compromise on the proportion of languages of tuition in secondary schools was reached and various support activities were organized (such as the release of tutorials and guidance materials and Latvian language improvement courses for teachers) attitude towards Latvian in every-day communication improved.

=== 2019–2025 education reform ===
On January 23, 2018, the Cabinet of Ministers agreed to begin an education reform in 2019 that included a gradual transition to Latvian as the sole language of general tuition in all ethnic minority secondary schools and increase the percentage of general subjects taught in Latvian in ethnic minority elementary schools (at least 50% for grades 1–6 and 80% for grades 7–9), with the exception of native language, literature and subjects related to culture and history of the ethnic minorities that will continue to be taught in the respective minority languages. On February 8, 2018, Saeima sent the amendments for review in the Saeima Education, culture and science committee. On March 9 the amendments were upheld in a second reading on Saeima and finally passed on March 23 in the third and final reading. On April 3, 2018, the amendments to Education Law and General Education Law were announced by President of Latvia Raimonds Vējonis.

==== Private universities and colleges ====
On July 4, 2018, Vējonis promulgated a controversial bill proposed by the Ministry of Education and Science on extending the same language restrictions for public higher education institutions to apply for private universities and colleges as well, meaning that private higher education institutions beginning from September 1, 2019, will not be allowed to enrol new students in study programs taught in non-official languages of the European Union, including Russian, and will have to complete the respective ongoing study programs by December 31, 2022. The bill was opposed by the opposition Social Democratic Party "Harmony", the Latvian Russian Union as well as the heads of several universities and NGOs.

Riga International School of Economics and Business Administration Vice-Rector Igors Graurs said it will affect the export capacity of Latvia's education, resulting in about 54 million euro loss for the Latvian economy. A similar view was expressed by Student Union of Latvia who called the proposal "a threat to study program development and education competitiveness in the European Higher Education Area, as well as the world." On 9 February 2023, Constitutional Court of Latvia ruled that the prohibition of private universities and other higher education institutions to implement education programmes in Russian and other non-official languages of the European Union does not breach the Constitution of Latvia. Ministry of Foreign Affairs of Russia criticised the ruling as "politically motivated". On 14 September 2023, European Court of Human Rights delivered its judgment in the case Džibuti and Others v. Latvia, unanimously ruling that the said restrictions do not violate the European Convention on Human Rights.

==== Reaction ====
On April 3, 2018, the Russian State Duma released a statement strongly objecting to the reform and claiming it "violates the principles observed by most civilized countries." and demanded for "special economic measures" to be taken against Latvia, while Ministry of Foreign Affairs of Russia warned the new legislation will have a negative impact on Latvia–Russia relations. Member of the State Duma Sergei Zheleznyak called the reform a "language genocide" and compared it to "open Nazism toward the Russian population" allegedly happening in Ukraine. Ministry of Foreign Affairs of Latvia responded that "The Russian officials who express their views on amendments to Latvian laws seem not to be familiar with the substance of the reform at all." and pointed out that Latvia's "support to minorities is significantly higher than in other European countries, including Russia".

On late April 2018, former MP and head of the Action Party Igor Melnikov filed a complaint to the Constitutional Court of Latvia over the transition's potential incompliance with several articles of the Constitution of Latvia and a number of international conventions. On July, the party "Harmony" submitted a similar lawsuit contesting the constitutionality of the reform on the basis that it allegedly discriminates ethnic minorities. On November Constitutional Court received one more complaint from students of a private elementary school with Russian as the language of tuition. On April 23, 2019, the Constitutional Court ruled that the transition does not infringe the right of ethnic minorities to education and dismissed the case submitted by members of Harmony. On 14 September 2023, European Court of Human Rights delivered its judgment in the case Valiullina and Others v. Latvia, unanimously ruling that the said amendments do not violate the European Convention on Human Rights.

==== Public protests ====
The reform also saw a series of protests from some Russian speakers. On October 23, 2017, almost 400 people, mostly the elderly and children, gathered outside the Ministry of Education and Science in a protest organized by the political party Latvian Russian Union. On December 14 the party organized a protest march through the Old Riga attended by several hundred demonstrators and on April 6 another protest march that initially was joined by more than 500 protesters, however by the time the procession reached the Cabinet of Ministers the number of protesters had grown to around 1,000 people. Minister of Education and Science of Latvia Kārlis Šadurskis dismissed the protests as "politically motivated", saying that Kremlin is interested in Latvia's Russian-speaking youth having poor Latvian language skills and keeping them under the influence of Russian propaganda.

==== Public attitude ====
In the first half of 2019, the research agency "SKDS" conducted a survey on the attitude towards the reform among the inhabitants of Latvia. Overall 41.4% of respondents supported the motion and 34.7% opposed it, however, the results showed a significant polarization of opinions, depending on the language spoken at home. Of those who spoke Latvian at home almost 60% expressed either full or partial support for the reform, whereas 64% of respondents speaking Russian at home said they were partially or completely against the motion.

== In mass media ==
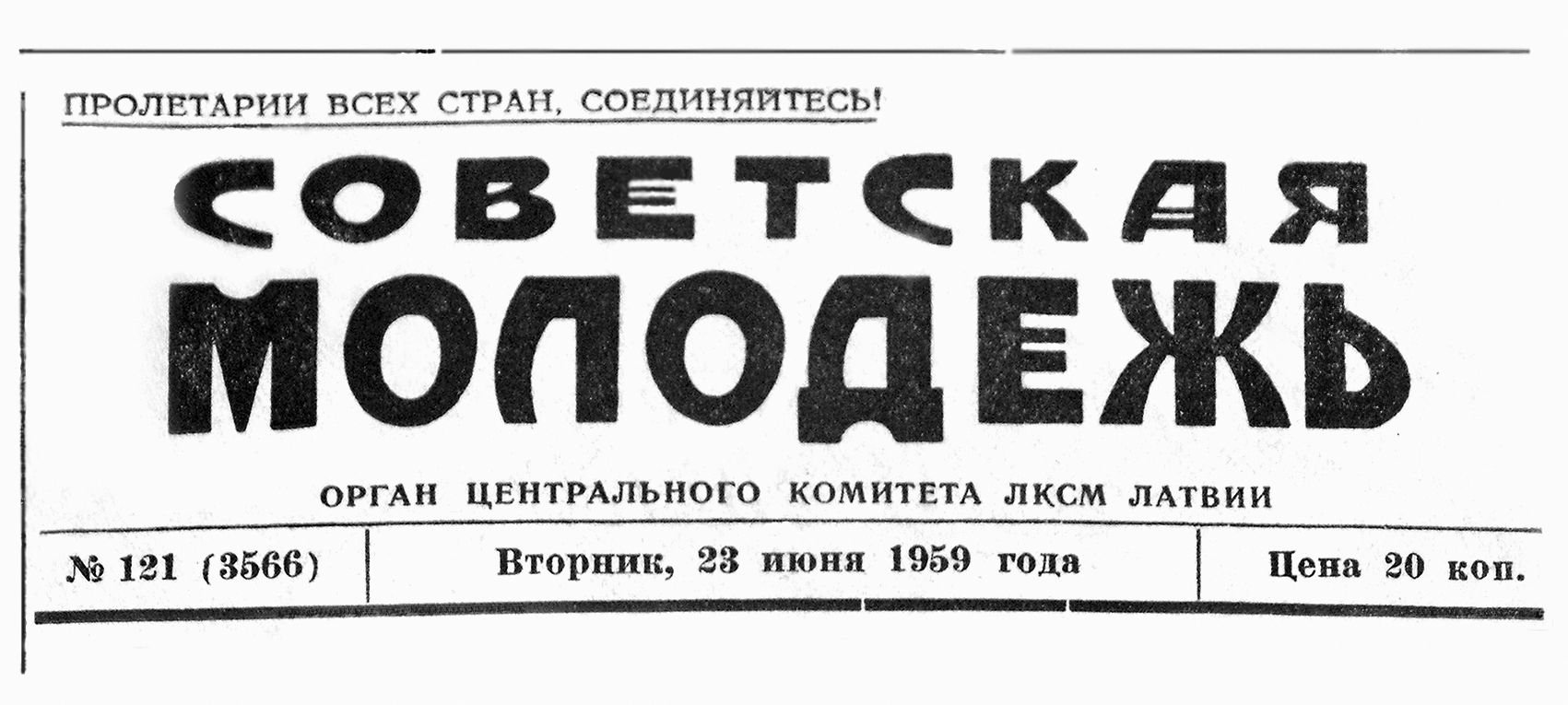
The ears of the Sovetskaya Molodyozh newspaper published in 1959

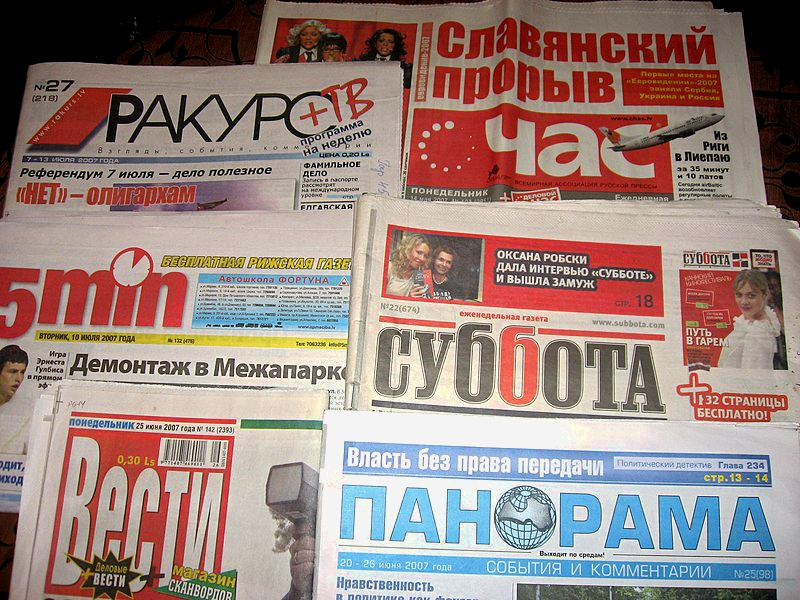
An assortment of Russian-language newspapers published in Latvia in 2007 – Rakurs, Chas, 5 min, Subbota, Vesti and Panorama (from top left to right)

The most prominent Russian-language newspaper in Latvia from 1918 to 1940 was Segodnya and it was known far beyond Latvia. During the Latvian SSR Sovetskaya Molodyozh first published in 1945 became a popular newspaper successfully competing with other Russian-language newspapers from the rest of the USSR. After the restoration of independence in 1991, the traditions of Sovetskaya Molodyozh were continued by newspapers such as Vesti segodnya, Chas, Biznes&Baltia, Telegraf and others. Nowadays, 4 daily Russian-language national newspapers, 11 weekly newspapers, as well as a dozen regional papers and over 30 magazines on various topics are published in Latvia.

According to the social and media research company TNS market 2016 survey, non-Latvians preferred watching Russian TV channels First Baltic channel, NTV Mir and Rossiya RTR. The four most popular Russian TV channels reached 72.6% of the non-Latvian audience a week, accounting for 41.7.8% of viewing time, as well as 47.6% of Latvian audience with 12.3% of viewing time. First Baltic channel was the most matched TV channel in Latvia with 11% of the total viewing time in September 2016.

=== Conflicts over language choice ===
On September 1, 2010, Minister of Transport Kaspars Gerhards walked out of the Russian-language TV5 show "Uncensored" (Без цензуры) live on air after being insisted by the host Andrejs Mamikins to speak Russian, which Gerhards refused, explaining they had been given a prior warning he would speak Latvian and that the studio could probably provide a translation. Mamikins pointed out that Gerhards had spoken Russian on TV before and started broadcasting prepared clips from the channel's archive of him doing so. Gerhards once again refused to switch to Russian and left the studio on an advertising break.

On October 17, 2016, National Electronic Mass Media Council sent a letter to the administration of Latvian Television calling it to provide a translation in the state-language if needed and not to exclude representatives from invited institutions for not speaking Russian after it received a complaint from a state institution whose representative was denied participation in the state-owned LTV7 Russian-language talk show Tochki nad i (Точкu над i) for wanting to speak Latvian on the basis that "it's not technically possible to provide a translation during the broadcast, because extra resources would be required." In September 2018, Tochki nad i host Oļegs Ignatjevs informed National Alliance he would not allow Latvian being spoken by the party's representative on the upcoming show's episode on education in minority languages. National Alliance warned it would file a complaint to the National Electronic Mass Media Council. Soon after Ignatjevs resigned saying:

I understood that they simply want to use this situation. To come to the show and say, look at how patriotic we are as even here we talk Latvian and no one can object...I don't want me and my show to be involved in these cheap political ploys.

LTV responded by saying that it "could provide an interpreter for people who can't or won't speak Russian" and that "the public broadcaster cannot allow a situation where someone is excluded for wanting to speak the official state language."

== See also ==
- Language policy in Latvia
