= Headquarters for the Protection of Russian Schools =

Headquarters for the Protection of Russian Schools (Russian: Штаб защиты русских школ, romanized: Shtab zashchity russkikh shkol; Latvian: Krievu skolu aizstāvības štābs) was a movement for the preservation of public secondary education in Russian in Latvia. Its leaders were Vladimir Buzayev, Genadijs Kotovs, Jurijs Petropavlovskis, Miroslavs Mitrofanovs, Mihails Tjasins, Viktors Dergunovs, Vladislavs Rafaļskis, and for some time also Alexander Kazakov (expelled from Latvia in 2004). One of its most prominent spokesmen was Yakov Pliner.

== Aims of the movement ==
Cancelling the Education law provisions, which originally ordered the language of instruction in public secondary schools (Forms 10-12) to be only Latvian (later, at least 60% Latvian) since 2004. It also supports providing effective learning of Latvian language in the Latvian language and literature lessons and specific preparation of teachers for Russian schools.

== History ==
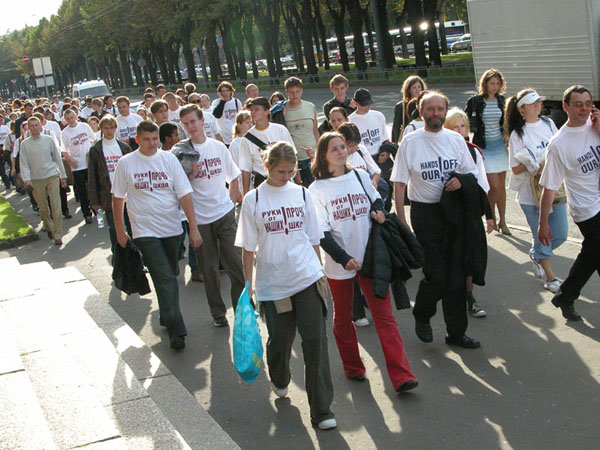
A 2003 protest march against the upcoming 2004 minority school transfer to bilingual education organised by the Headquarters for the Protection of Russian Schools

The staff was founded in April 2003 as a coalition of various organizations, most prominent being ForHRUL, and later expanded, involving nonpartisan people. In 2003–2004, the Staff has organized political demonstrations (according to the Freedom House and political scientist Tatjana Boguševiča, the biggest ones in Latvia since the beginning of the 1990s) to protest to expanding use of Latvian language in Russian schools. Freedom House has also noted that "Over half of all Russian students took part in protests."

As a result, the Education Law was amended in February 2004, allowing to teach up to 40% in the forms 10-12 in minority languages. The proportion of teaching 60% of subjects in Latvian and 40% in Russian, according to BISS research, was supported by 20% of the teachers, 15% of pupils and 13% of parents in minority schools and most stated that they would rather support bilingual instruction in all subjects; only 15% of teachers thought that no reform was needed, while this opinion was expressed by 36% of parents and 44% of pupils. The parliamentary opposition started two cases before the Constitutional Court of Latvia (abjudicated in May and September, 2005) with most of its demands being refused.

After 2005, the activity of the organization fizzled out, with its followers joining other similar organizations, like the United Congress of Russian Communities (Latvian: Latvijas Krievu Kopienu apvienotais kongress, Russian: ОКРОЛ) founde in September 2004 and others.

== See also ==
- Russian language in Latvia
- Language policy in Latvia
