= Language policy in Latvia =

Articles 4 and 114 of the Constitution of Latvia form the foundation for language policy in Latvia, declaring Latvian to be the official state language and affirming the rights of ethnic minorities to preserve and develop their languages. Livonian language is recognized as "the language of the indigenous (autochthon) population" in the Official Language Law, but Latgalian written language is protected as "a historic variant of Latvian." All other languages are considered foreign by the Law on State Language (Official Language Law in other translations). Latvia provides national minority education programmes in Russian (the first language for over one third of the population), Polish, Hebrew, Ukrainian, Estonian, Lithuanian, and Belarusian.

The preamble to the Official Language Law includes as its goals "the integration of members of ethnic minorities into the society of Latvia, while observing their rights to use their native language or other languages; [and] the increased influence of Latvian in the cultural environment of Latvia, to promote a more rapid integration of society."

== Legal framework ==
The official language (valsts valoda, literally state language) in Latvia is Latvian; this status has been explicitly defined since 1988. In 1992, amendments to the 1989 Law on Languages strengthened the position of Latvian. All other languages, except the native Livonian language, are defined as foreign languages in Section 5 of the Official Language Law of 1999. Section 3.3 stipulates that '[t]he State shall ensure the development and use of the Latvian sign language for communication with people with impaired hearing.'

Since 1998, the official status of Latvian has been written into the Constitution (Article 4); and since 2002, MPs have been asked to promise to strengthen Latvian as the only official language in order to take their seats (Article 18). In the Constitution's chapter on human rights, rights to get answers from authorities in Latvian are specified since 2002 (Article 104). The current Official Language Law was not amended since its adoption in 1999 (as of 2017).

In 1995, Latvia signed, and in 2005 ratified the Council of Europe's Framework Convention for the Protection of National Minorities. When ratifying it, the Latvian Saeima (Parliament) made two declarations (worded as reservations) limiting the implementation of Articles 10 and 11. As of 2008, Latvia did not plan to sign the European Charter for Regional or Minority Languages.

Language policy is implemented by a number of institutions: the State Language Commission (under the President) prepares proposals in this field; the State Language Centre (under the Ministry of Justice) executes control, imposes fines for administrative violations and translates documents of international significance; the Latvian Language Agency (under the Ministry of Education and Science) provides consultations and opportunities for learning Latvian and analyses the language situation.

== Official use of languages ==
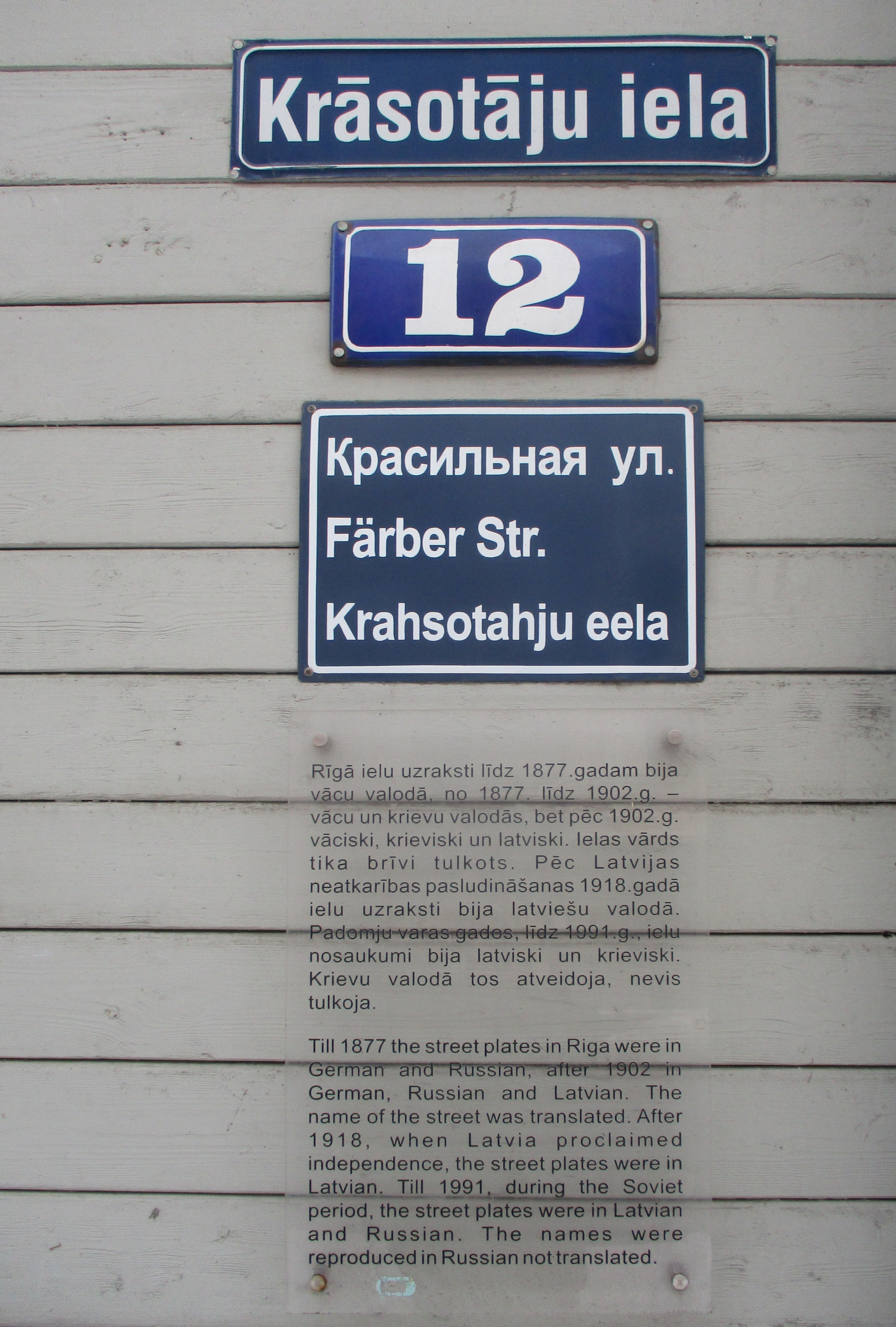
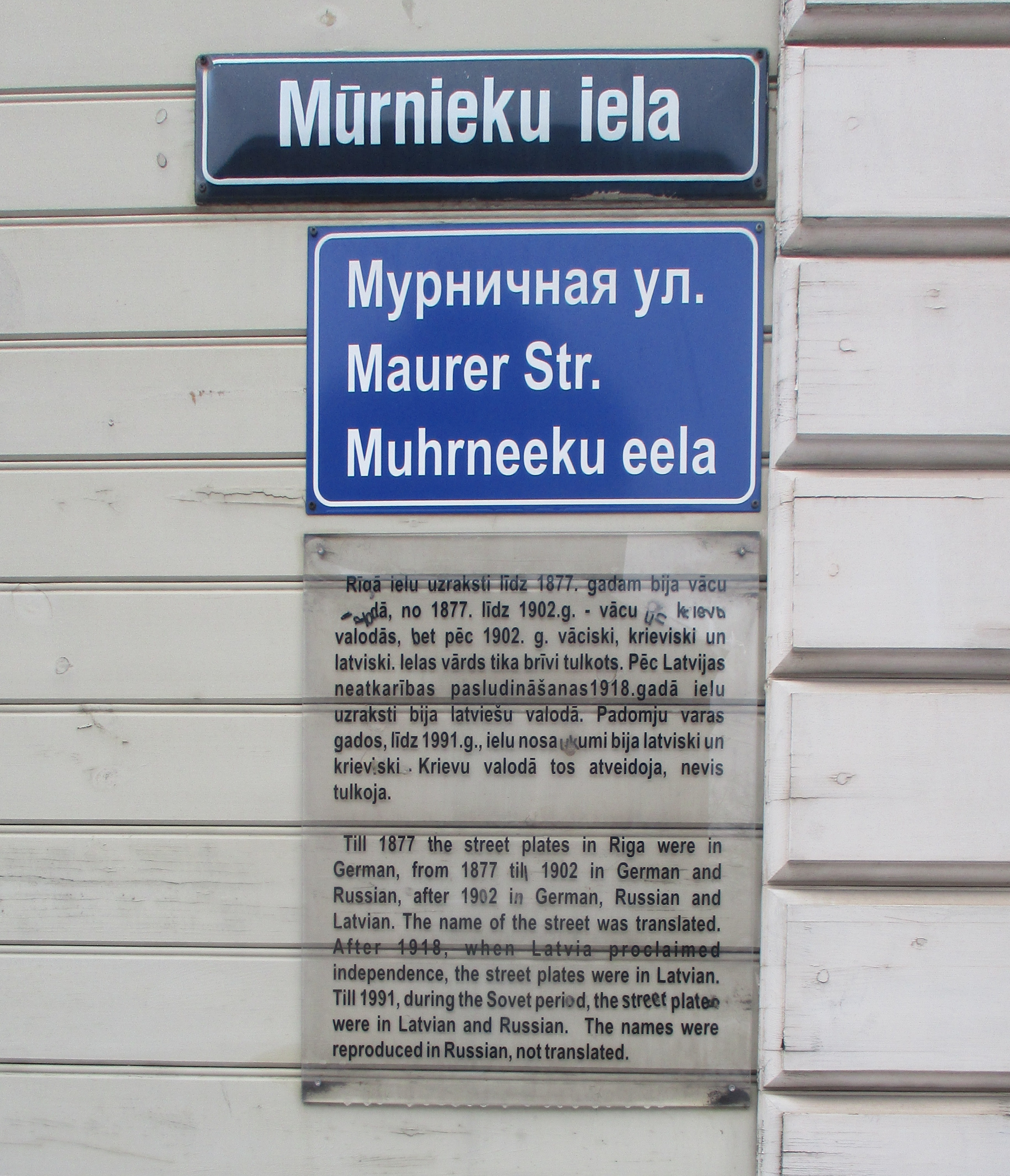
Modern monolingual street plates for Krāsotāji Street and Mūrnieki Street in Riga and decorative trilingual plates with the historical street names in the Old Latvian orthography (Krahsohtaju eela, Muhrneeku eela) and other historical state languages – Russian (Красильня улица, Мурничная улица) and German (Färber Straße, Maurer Straße).

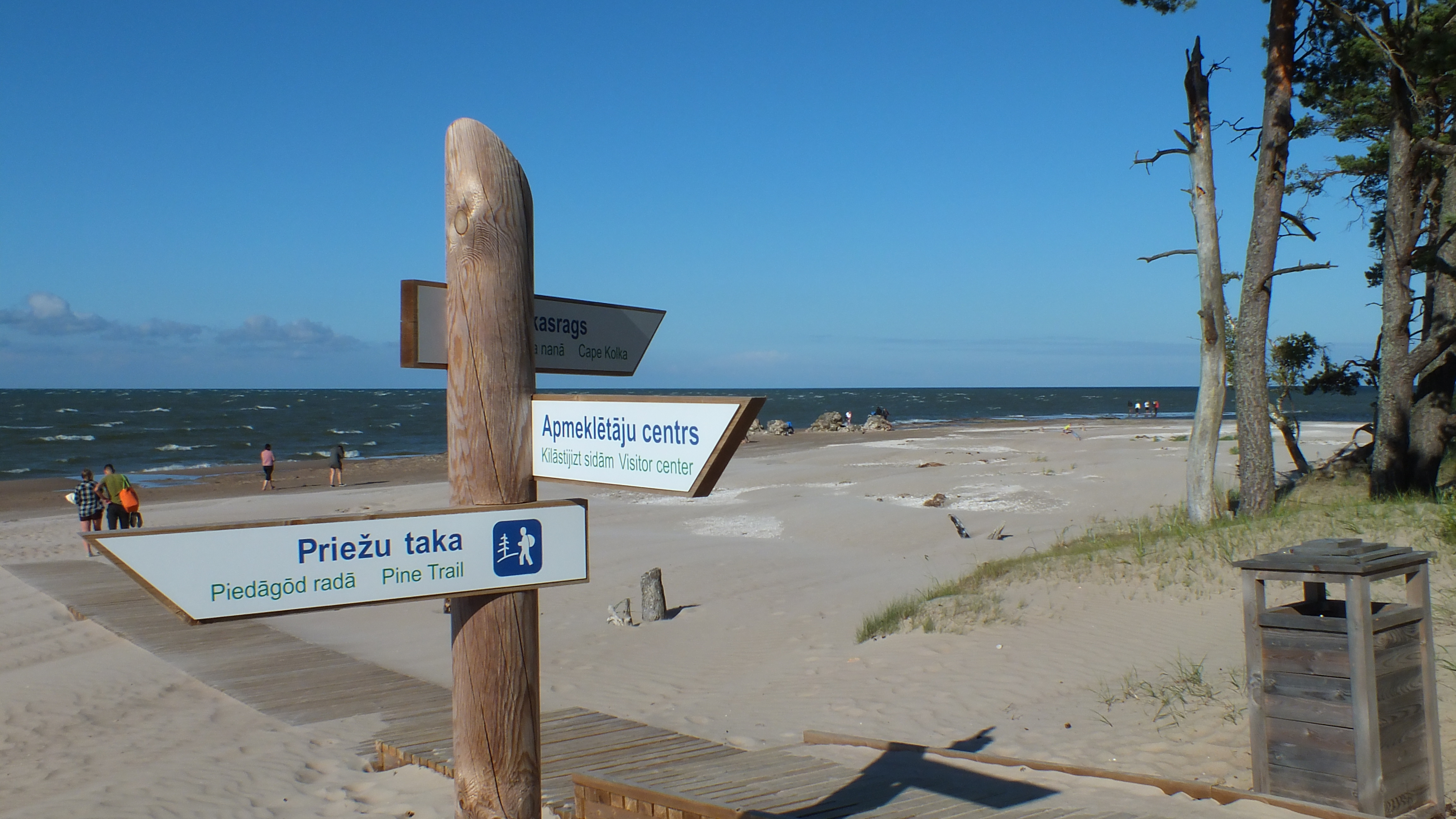
Trilingual signposts in Latvian, Livonian and English at the Livonian Coast

Since the Official Language Law came into force in 2000, submitting documents to the government (local included) and state public enterprises is allowed in Latvian only, except in cases specially defined in the law (emergency services, foreign residents, etc.), according to Section 10. From 1992 to 2000, authorities had to accept documents in Russian, German and English, too, and were allowed to answer in the language of the application.

Before the losses of the Latvian government in the cases Podkolzina v. Latvia (ECHR) and Ignatāne v. Latvia (UN HRC), a certain level of command in Latvian was asked for eligibility to Parliament and local councils. In practice, this had led to re-examinations of various candidates, at least sometimes unexpected, which prevented Ignatāne and Podkolzina (representatives of the Equal Rights party in the 1997 local and 1998 parliamentary elections) from participation. As of 2011, candidates do not need to prove language proficiency, but elected members of Saeima and local councilors can be deprived of mandate for insufficient command of Latvian.

Names and surnames in Latvian-issued documents are formed in Latvianized form, according to Section 19. These provisions were subject in ECHR cases Kuhareca v. Latvia and Mencena v. Latvia (both declared inadmissible in 2004), since the Latvian Constitutional Court had found them constitutional in 2001. An analogous application was submitted to UN HRC in 2007 and won by the applicant on grounds of privacy (Raihman v. Latvia).

Toponyms are formed in Latvian only (on the Livonian coast in Livonian as well), according to Section 18 of the Official Language Law.

The Electronic Mass Media Law orders to use only Latvian in the first channels of public radio and television, and basically Latvian in their second channels (Section 66).

The government of Latvia in its policy documents refers to Latvia as a (democratic) nation state, constructing societal integration on the basis of Latvian, while respecting the diversity of languages. Unity block, comprising most of the governing coalition as of 2011, also describes Latvia as a nation state. The idea of the nation state, where "language = nation", is seen as the core and main engine of the language policy of the Latvian state. Critics draw parallels between measures of the Latvian government and the assimilation of linguistic minorities in various countries.

One critic, James Hughes, Reader in Comparative Politics at the London School of Economics and Political Science, has pointed out that Russian-speakers in Latvia constitute one of the largest linguistic minorities in Europe, therefore he considers Latvia's language laws to be denying Russophones their language rights, and thus they are contrary to international practice in the field of minority rights. Nataliya Pulina in Moskovskiye Novosti asserts that Latvia's Russophones are by percentage actually the largest linguistic minority in the EU whose language has no official status.

Among the political parties, ForHRUL offers in its programme to grant official status to Russian in municipalities where it is native for more than 20% of the population. In a draft of its political programme, Harmony Centre offers to grant co-official status to Latgalian and Russian in printed media, public sphere and education (for Russian, in communication with authorities, as well), stressing its support for the sole state language. Both these parties are in permanent opposition on the state level.

According to research conducted by the Baltic Institute of Social Sciences in 2004, the majority (77%) of ethnic Latvians opposed (56%) or mostly opposed (21%) granting Russian status as a second official language, while the majority (87%) of ethnic Russians supported (59%) or mostly supported (28%) such status, while a majority (75%) of other ethnicities also supported (40%) or rather supported (35%) such status (sample size was 1,018 respondents, with 51% supporting or rather supporting official status for Russian and 44% opposing or rather opposing it).

== Private use of languages ==
The Law on Electronic Media prescribes that national and regional electronic media need to broadcast at least 65% in Latvian (section 32). Besides, films aired in any channel should be dubbed in Latvian or have the original soundtrack and Latvian subtitles; TV broadcasts in languages other than Latvian, except news, live events, language learning broadcasts, and retranslated content, must be subtitled in Latvian.(Section 28). The same concerns films shown in cinemas, according to Section 17 of Official Language Law. Until a judgement of the Constitutional Court upon request of 24 ForHRUL MPs (delivered in 2003), broadcasting in minority languages was limited for private TV and radio (originally within 30%, since 1998 within 25%).

According to Section 6 of Official Language Law, levels of skills in Latvian are defined for various professions, which concern the legitimate public interest. Totally, there are six levels and two lists of professions (longer for the public sector and shorter for the private sector), classified by required level. For those who did not get an education in Latvian and are not disabled, an examination is required to define their skills in Latvian, to work in these professions. Those who fail to show the required level during inspections can be fined. The labour market shows high demand for skills in Latvian, Russian and English languages.

According to Section 11 of State Language Law, organizers of public events have to provide in Latvian information, which concerns legitimate public interest (defined in Section 2 – public safety, health care et cetera). The same affects posters, billboards and signboards, according to Section 21. Previously, according to the Law of languages as amended in 1992 (Section 5), organizers of any public event had to provide a translation into Latvian in their conferences. An exemption had existed for organizations of ethnic minorities and religious organizations; 1997 Law on Meetings, Processions and Pickets has foreseen free choice of language in meetings, pickets and processions, too (Section 19).

== Education ==
Since the beginning of the 1990s, some Polish language schools were created besides the existing schools with Latvian and Russian language of instruction. Certain schools (e.g., Riga Dubnov Jewish Secondary school, founded in 1989, and Riga Ukrainian Secondary School, founded in 1991, which had originally used Ukrainian as language of instruction, but switched to Latvian in 1993/1994) now include in their curriculum lessons in respective minority languages. The number of Russian schools is decreasing, partly due to natural demographic decline and partly due to emigration, as the following table demonstrates, with some schools with apparent viability closed.

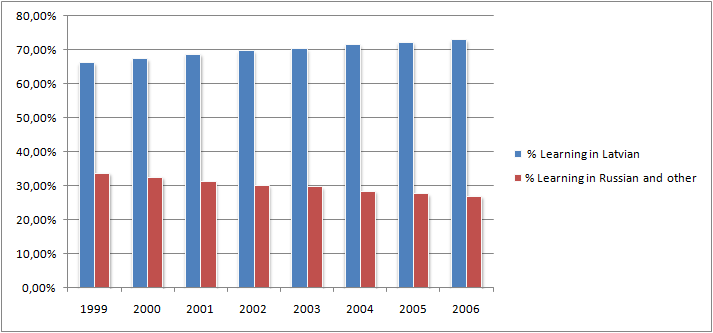
Instruction in Latvian gradually increased its share 1999–2006

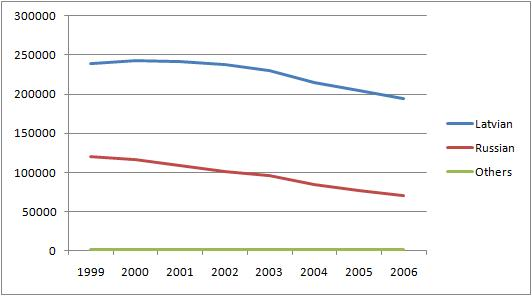
In total numbers, both Latvian and Russian decreased while the number of students enrolled in classes with another language of instruction remained minimal.

Number of students by language of instruction (Ministry of Education and Science)
School year	95–96	99–00	00–01	01–02	02–03	03–04	04–05	05–06	06–07
Latvian	203,607	239,163	242,475	242,183	237,425	230,212	214,855	205,189	194,230
Russian	132,540	120,925	116,009	108,454	101,486	95,841	84,559	77,471	70,683
Others	1513	1344	1344	1352	1397	1305	1253	1287	1198
Total	337,660	361,432	359,818	351,989	340,308	327,358	300,667	283,947	266,111
% learning in Latvian	60.3	66.2	67.4	68.8	69.8	70.3	71.5	72.3	73.0

As at 2007, there was also an increasing number of minority children attending Latvian-language schools.

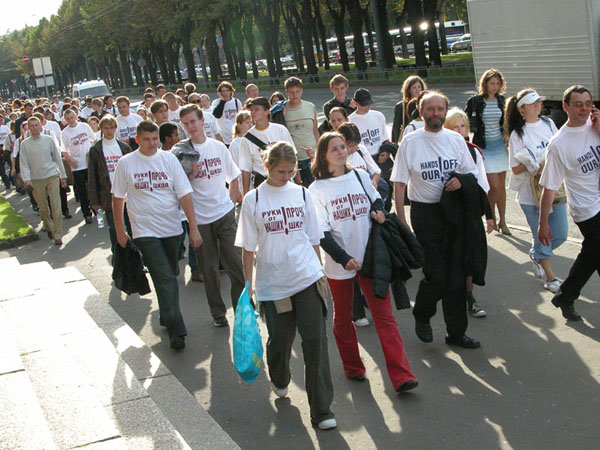
A 2003 protest march against the upcoming 2004 minority school transfer to bilingual education (at least 60% in Latvian and at most 40% in the minority language) organised by the Headquarters for the Protection of Russian Schools

According to Education law, as adopted in 1998, the language of instruction in public secondary schools (Forms 10–12) had to be only Latvian since 2004. This has mostly affected Russian schools, some existing in Latvia without interruption since at least 1789. After protests in 2003 and 2004 organized by the Headquarters for the Protection of Russian Schools, the law was amended allowing to teach up to 40% of curricula in minority languages (Transition Rules) and allowing orphans to continue their education not only in Latvian, but also in the language he or she began it (Section 56).

In 2005, one judgment of the Constitutional Court (upon request of ForHRUL, NHP and LSP MPs) has declared unconstitutional the ban of public co-funding for private minority schools, another has declared the proportion "60+:40" constitutional.

On 23 January 2018, the Cabinet of Ministers agreed to begin an education reform in 2019 that included a gradual transition to Latvian as the sole language of general tuition in all ethnic minority secondary schools and increase the percentage of general subjects taught in Latvian in ethnic minority elementary schools (at least 50% for grades 1–6 and 80% for grades 7–9), with the exception of native language, literature and subjects related to culture and history of the ethnic minorities that will continue to be taught in the respective minority languages. On 9 March 2018, the amendments were upheld in a second reading on Saeima and finally passed on 23 March in the third and final reading. On 3 April 2018, the amendments to Education Law and General Education Law were announced by President of Latvia Raimonds Vējonis. This has caused concern of UN and Council of Europe experts. The Constitutional Court of Latvia, however, upheld the amendments in two judgments in 2019.

According to the same 1998 Education Law, the tertiary education in public colleges and universities has to be in Latvian only since 1999 (it had to be basically in Latvian since the second year, according to 1992 Law on Languages, Section 11). In fact, there still exist programmes with education in English for foreigners (Riga Technical University) or according to special laws (Riga Graduate School of Law). There is a demand for tertiary education in Russian, too: it is used, for example, at the Baltic International Academy.

On 4 July 2018 Vējonis promulgated a controversial bill proposed by the Ministry of Education and Science on extending the same language restrictions for public higher education institutions to apply for private universities and colleges as well, meaning that private higher education institutions beginning from 1 September 2019, will not be allowed to enrol new students in study programs taught in non-official languages of the European Union, including Russian, and will have to complete the respective ongoing study programs by 31 December 2022. The bill was opposed by the opposition Social Democratic Party "Harmony", as well as the heads of several universities and NGOs.

Classes in the Russian language in Latvian primary schools will end in 2025, with the Russian language being gradually phased out in private and public schools.

== Historical background ==
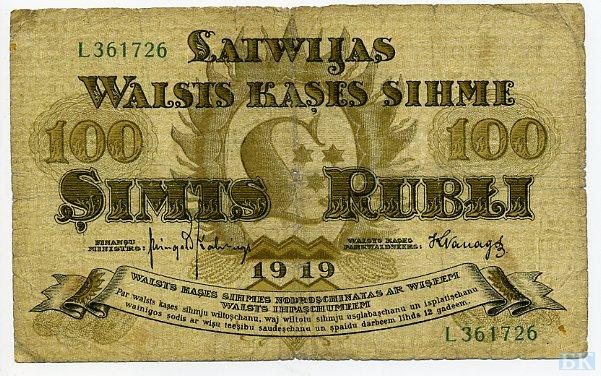
A banknote of the Republic of Latvia, 1919

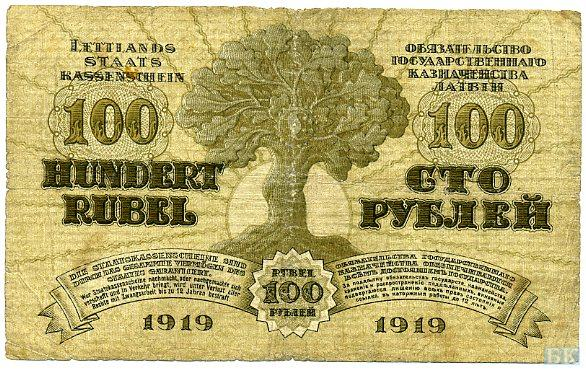
A banknote of the Republic of Latvia, 1919

In the medieval Livonian Confederation, Latin and German were the dominant languages of education and administration. German kept this position under subsequent periods of rule by Poland, Sweden and, initially, under the Russian Empire. German was the language of instruction in the first institution of tertiary education on the territory of Latvia (Riga Polytechnicum, founded in 1862). In Latgale, the Polish language gained some influence, beginning from the 16th century.

From the mid-19th century, Latvian started to rise in influence. At the end of the 19th century, tsar Alexander III instigated a policy of Russification in non-Russian areas of the Empire. As a result, language of administration, that of Riga Polytechnicum and most schools was changed from German to Russian, and some German toponyms in eastern Latvia were Russianized (e.g., Dünaburg became Dvinsk). After the 1905 revolution, possibilities for schooling in Latvian increased.

The pro-Bolshevik revolutionary soviet, Iskolat, declared on 4 January 1918 that Latvian should be the primary language of administration on the territory of Latvia.

Under the short-lived Latvian Socialist Soviet Republic in 1919, Latgalian enjoyed co-equal status with both Latvian and Russian as an official language of administration.

The Republic of Latvia (founded in 1918) was initially liberal in its language policy: while Latvianizing toponyms (e.g., Dvinsk became Daugavpils), it also allowed Russian and German languages to be used in Parliament along Latvian, acknowledged minorities' rights to learn in schools in their mother tongues and, despite switching public tertiary education to Latvian, did not forbid private post-secondary education in minority languages. State had acknowledged public use of Latgalian. After 1934 Ulmanis coup d'état the policy changed, and many minority high schools were closed. Particularly hard hit were the Belarusian primary schools, all but 5 of which were closed. Belarusian schoolteachers and other intellectuals in Latvia were suspected of having a pro-Soviet agenda harmful to national security.

During World War II, Latvia's German community was mostly moved to Germany, and the Jewish community was destroyed (hit first by the Soviet deportations in 1941, then by the Holocaust). Due to that, these groups' respective schools disappeared.

In the postwar Latvian Soviet Socialist Republic, the proportion of Latvian-speaking population decreased due to large losses in World War II and mass deportations, while the Russian-speaking population increased due to the presence of military forces and mass immigration of labour to implement the Soviet Union's industrialization policy (still, due to low birth rate, the population of Latvia had grown by 27.4% between 1959 and 1989 censuses, while that of the whole USSR – by 36.8%). Consequently, the use of Russian increased and it started to dominate in the areas integrated on a federal level (state security, railway etc.). As concerns tertiary education, in some faculties, the language of instruction was only Latvian, in some, only Russian; in some there were two language "streams". Under Stalinism, Polish schools were closed and after Arvīds Pelše's 1959 victory over the "national communists" (Eduards Berklavs et al.), the last Latgalian newspaper was closed.

Latvian was declared the state language of the Latvian SSR by a decree of the republican Supreme Soviet on 6 October 1988. Nevertheless, citizens could still choose to communicate with state authorities in Russian, and all correspondence with the USSR's federal bodies was to be in Russian.

== Demographic background ==
In the first post-Soviet census in 2000, 1,311,093 persons in Latvia reported Latvian as their mother tongue, representing the vast majority of the estimated 1.5 million Latvian speakers worldwide.

In the year 2000, Livonian was a moribund language spoken by some 35 people, of whom only 10 were fluent. In the first decade of the 21st century, it was estimated that Livonian was the native tongue of 4 people in Latvia, all of whom were older than 70. Grizelda Kristiņa, the last native speaker of Livonian, died on 2 June 2013. Currently, it is under a revival process.

Latvia's current territory is a close approximation to the range of Latvian habitation since the Latvian people emerged. As such, Latvian and Livonian are native only to Latvia.

In the 2000 census, 891,451 respondents (698,757 respondents census 2011) listed Russian as their mother tongue, representing 37.5% (33.7%, census 2011) of the total population, whereas Latvian was recorded as the mother tongue for 58.2%. Latvian was spoken as a second language by 20.8% of the population, and 43.7% spoke Russian as a second language. At that time, in age groups up to 10–14 years, a greater proportion of Russians could speak Latvian than ethnic Latvians could speak Russian. In age groups over 15 years, however, more Latvians expressed proficiency in Russian than vice versa. In total, 71% of ethnic Latvians said they could speak Russian, and 52% of Russians could speak Latvian.

Of all districts and cities in Latvia, the highest command of Latvian was in Talsi district (98.8%), while the lowest was in Daugavpils (41.4%). In Daugavpils was also the highest percentage of people speaking Russian (95.7%), and in Kuldīga district the lowest (57.6%). There was a similar breakdown with regards to mother tongue: 94.6% in Talsi district and for 11.6% in Daugavpils for Latvian, 80.4% in Daugavpils and for 3.0% in Talsi district for Russian.

In the previous 1989 census, conducted while Latvia was still part of the USSR, Latvian was reported as the native language for 52.0% of the population, Russian for 42.1%; 62.3% of the population could speak Latvian, and 81.6% could speak Russian.

Latgalian was not considered a language separate from Latvian in any census, whether during the Soviet period or since the restoration of independence. Therefore, no specific data on the number of its native speakers were available until the 2011 census. Then, 8.8% of the population indicated they use Latgalian, described as a variety of Latvian.

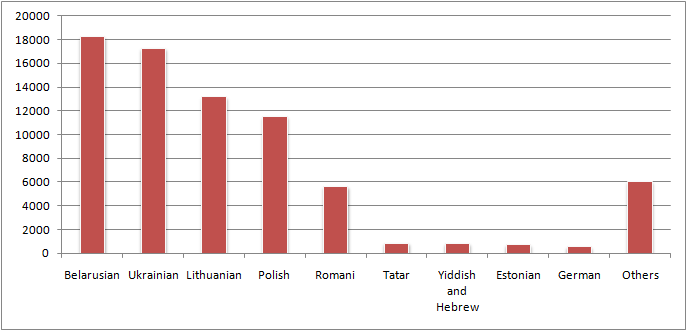
Smaller minority languages in Latvia (census 2000)

Other than native speakers of Latvian and Russian, the numbers of speakers of different mother tongues recorded in the 2000 census were:

- Belarusian: 18,265
- Ukrainian: 17,301
- Lithuanian: 13,187
- Polish: 11,529
- Romani: 5,637
- Tatar: 867
- Yiddish and Hebrew: 825
- Estonian: 720
- German: 541
- Others: 6,055

== International recommendations ==
In 1999, the Organization for Security and Co-operation in Europe High Commissioner on National Minorities found Latvia's new language law to be "essentially in conformity with Latvia's international obligations and commitments". In 2000, he stated that the government regulations were "essentially in conformity with both the Law and Latvia's international obligations", but that "specific matters will have to be reviewed upon Latvia's anticipated ratification of the Framework Convention for the Protection of National Minorities". The ratification took place in 2005.

International organizations have recommended to Latvia on various occasions to:

- revisit language policy, aiming to better reflect the multilingual character of society;
- facilitate use of minority languages in written correspondence between people belonging to the national minorities and authorities;
- be flexible in the introduction of bilingual education;
- give priority to constructive and non-obligatory measures, encouraging the Russian-speaking population to learn and use Latvian.
