= RISEBA University of Business, Arts and Technology =

Business school in Riga, Latvia

Coordinates: 56.9443°N 24.0804°E

"RISEBA" University of Applied Sciences
- Biznesa, mākslas un tehnoloģiju augstskola RISEBA
- Other names: RISEBA
- Former names: Riga International School of Economics and Business Administration
- Type: Private
- Established: 1992; 34 years ago
- Chairman: Mr. Jevgenijs Kurovs
- Rector: Dr.psych. Lūcija Rutka
- Students: 2444
- Location: Riga, Latvia
- Website: www.riseba.lv

The RISEBA University of Applied Sciences (Latvian: Biznesa, mākslas un tehnoloģiju augstskola "RISEBA") is a private international business school located in Riga, Latvia. Until April 2016 it was known as the "Riga International School of Economics and Business Administration". The school was established in 1992. Other than Riga, the school has another campus in Daugavpils.

RISEBA comprises three major academic components or schools:

- School of Business with Bachelor, Master and PhD programmes, which cover the areas of business, management and economics - Faculty of Business and Economics
- School of Media and Communication with Bachelor and Master and PhD programmes in arts and communications - Faculty of Media and Creative Technologies
- School of Architecture and Design, which currently offers a Bachelor programme in Architecture. - Faculty of Architecture and Design

== Courses ==
The school offers undergraduate and post-graduate and doctoral studies.

== Notable alumni ==
- Anda Čakša (born on July 11, 1974) is a Latvian doctor, businessman and politician. Former Minister of Health of the Republic of Latvia. Currently, she represents the political party "Vienotība", has represented the "Latviijas zaļo un zemnieku" party, the list of which has been elected to the 13th Saeima.
- Viesturs Boka (born 1948) is a Latvian surgeon, professor and politician at the University of Latvia. Former deputy of the 6th Saeima and member of the Riga City Council for several terms.

== Gallery ==
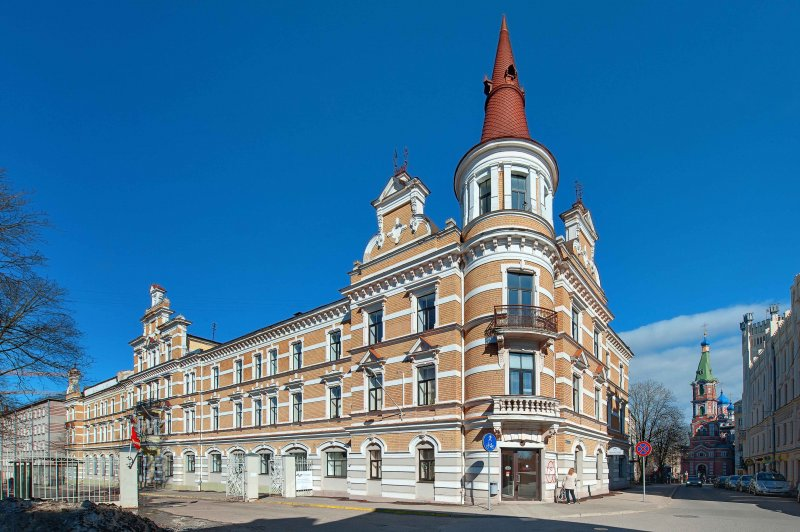
RISEBA University of Applied Sciences (main building) Meža Street 3

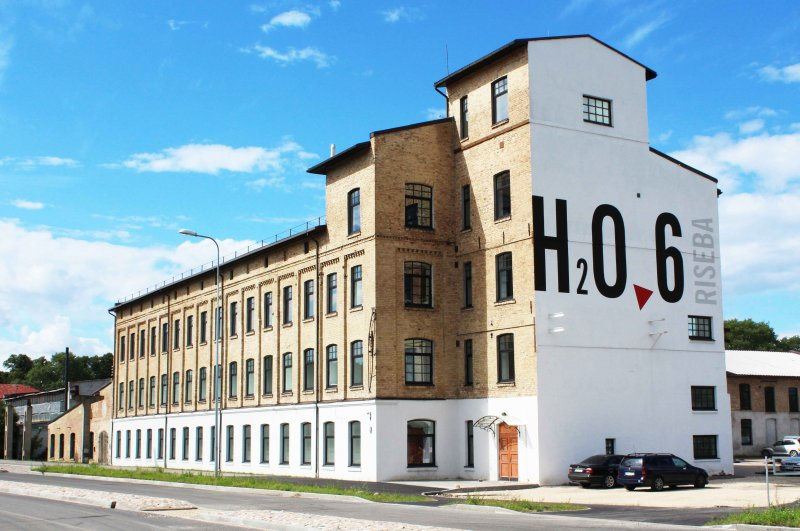
RISEBA University of Applied Sciences FAD, Durbes Street 4

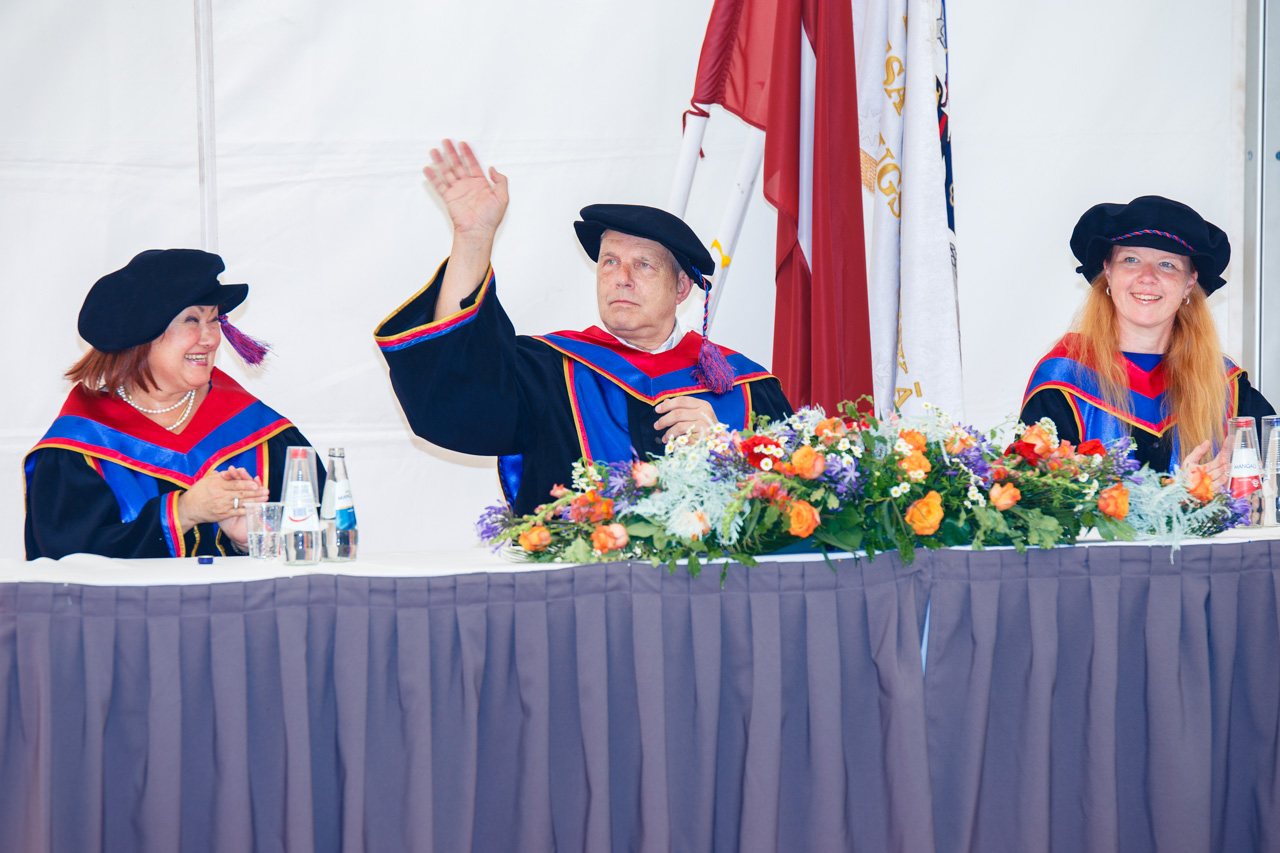
RISEBA University of Applied Sciences Management

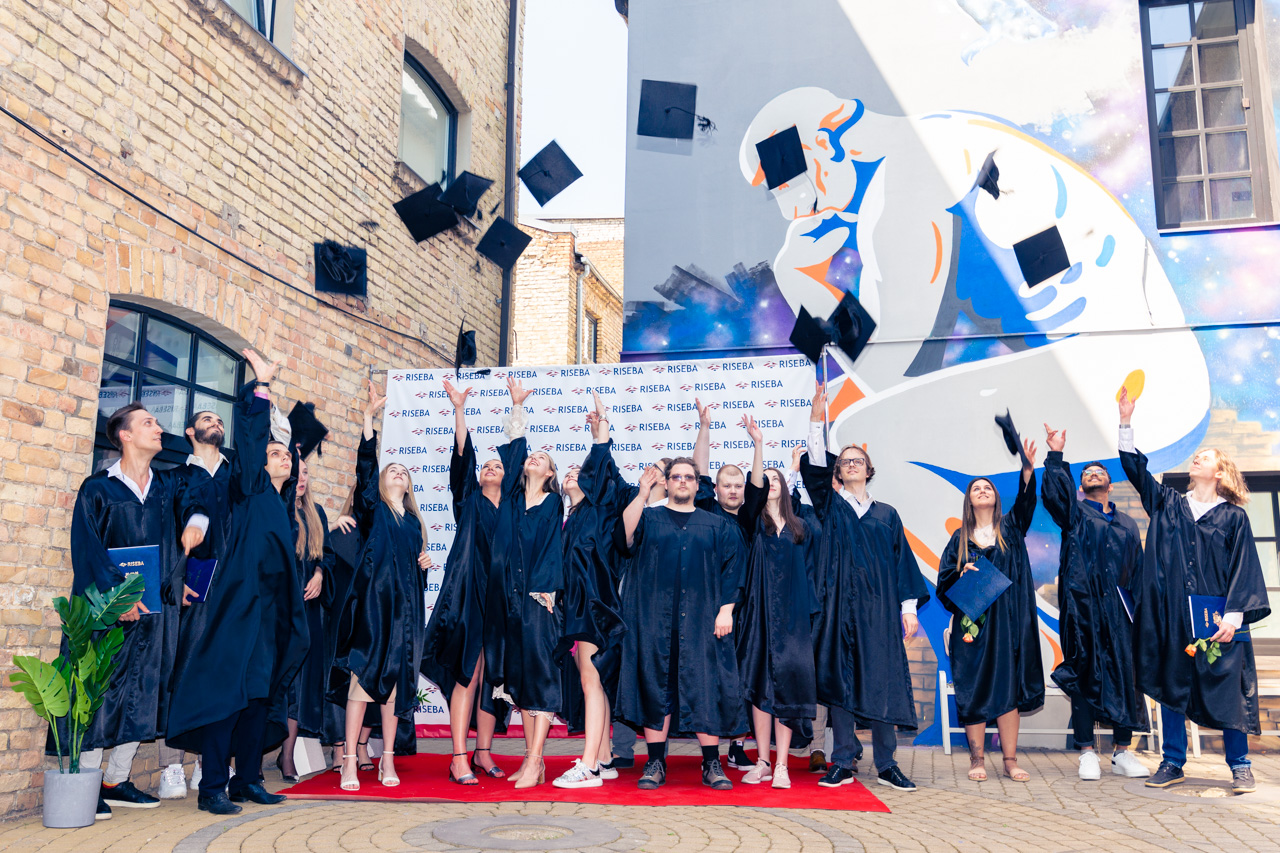
RISEBA University of Applied Sciences alumni

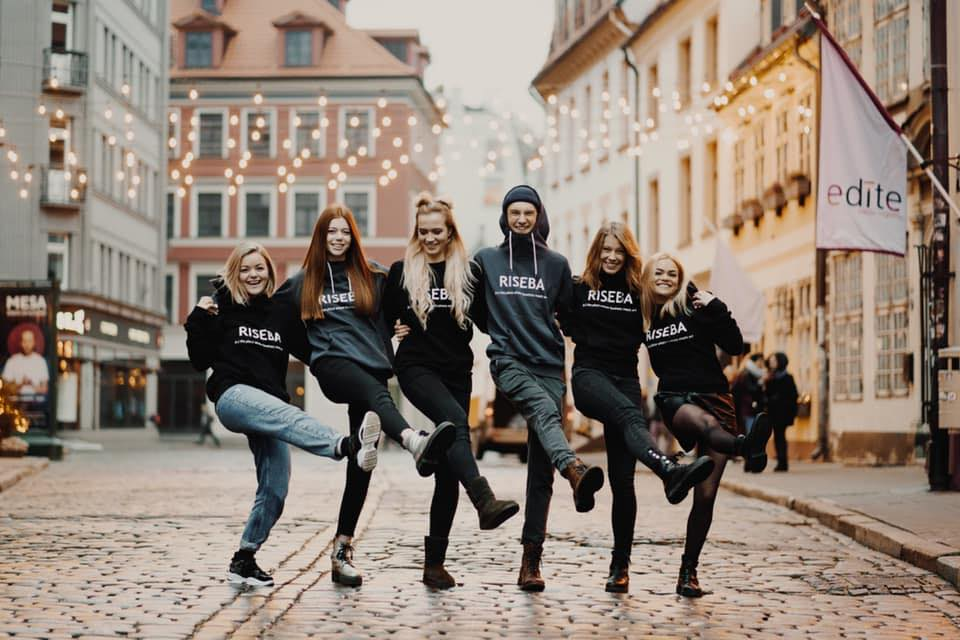
RISEBA University of Applied Sciences Student Council

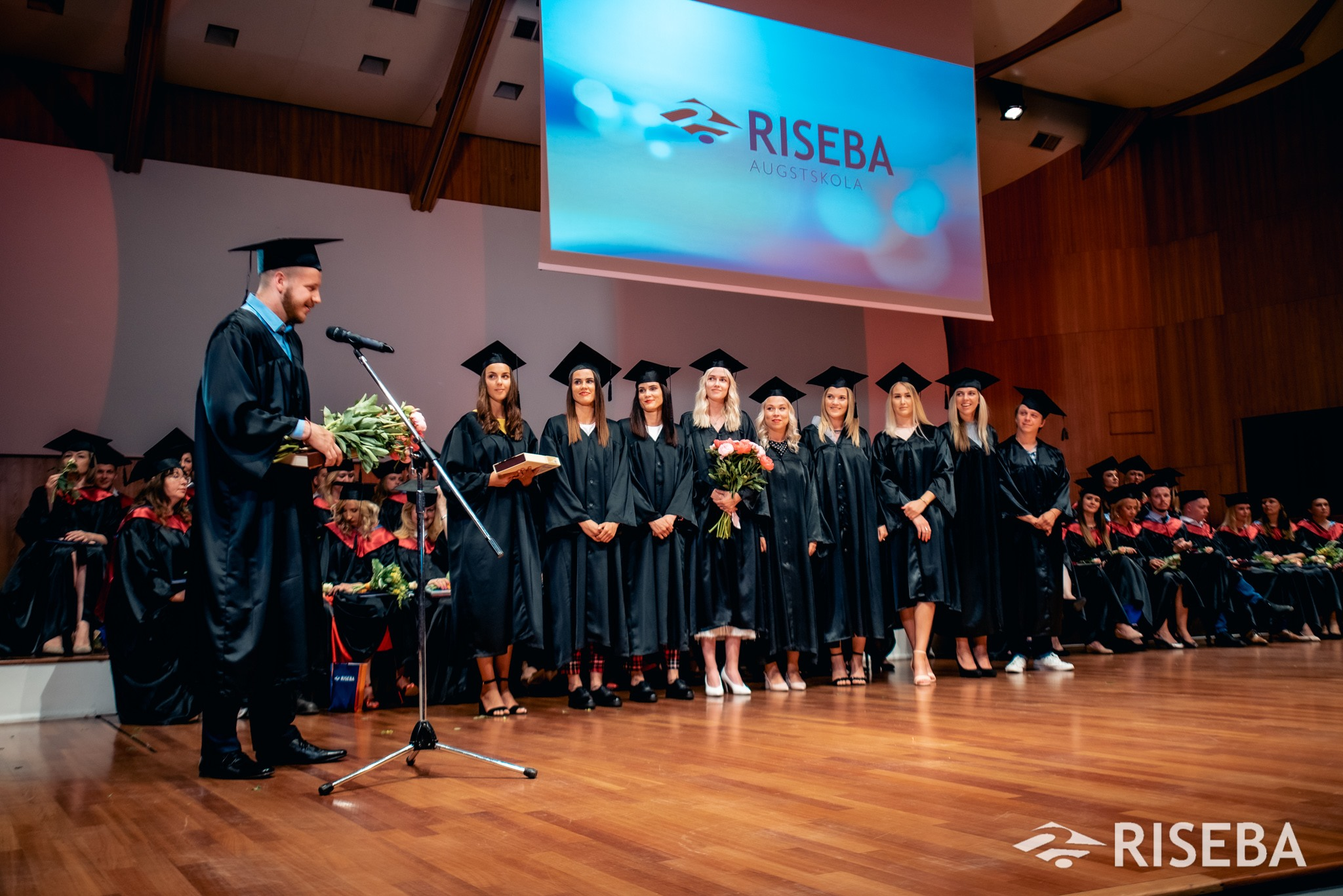
RISEBA University of Applied Sciences alumni
