= Latvian State Language Center =

Latvian State Language Centre
- Valsts valodas centrs
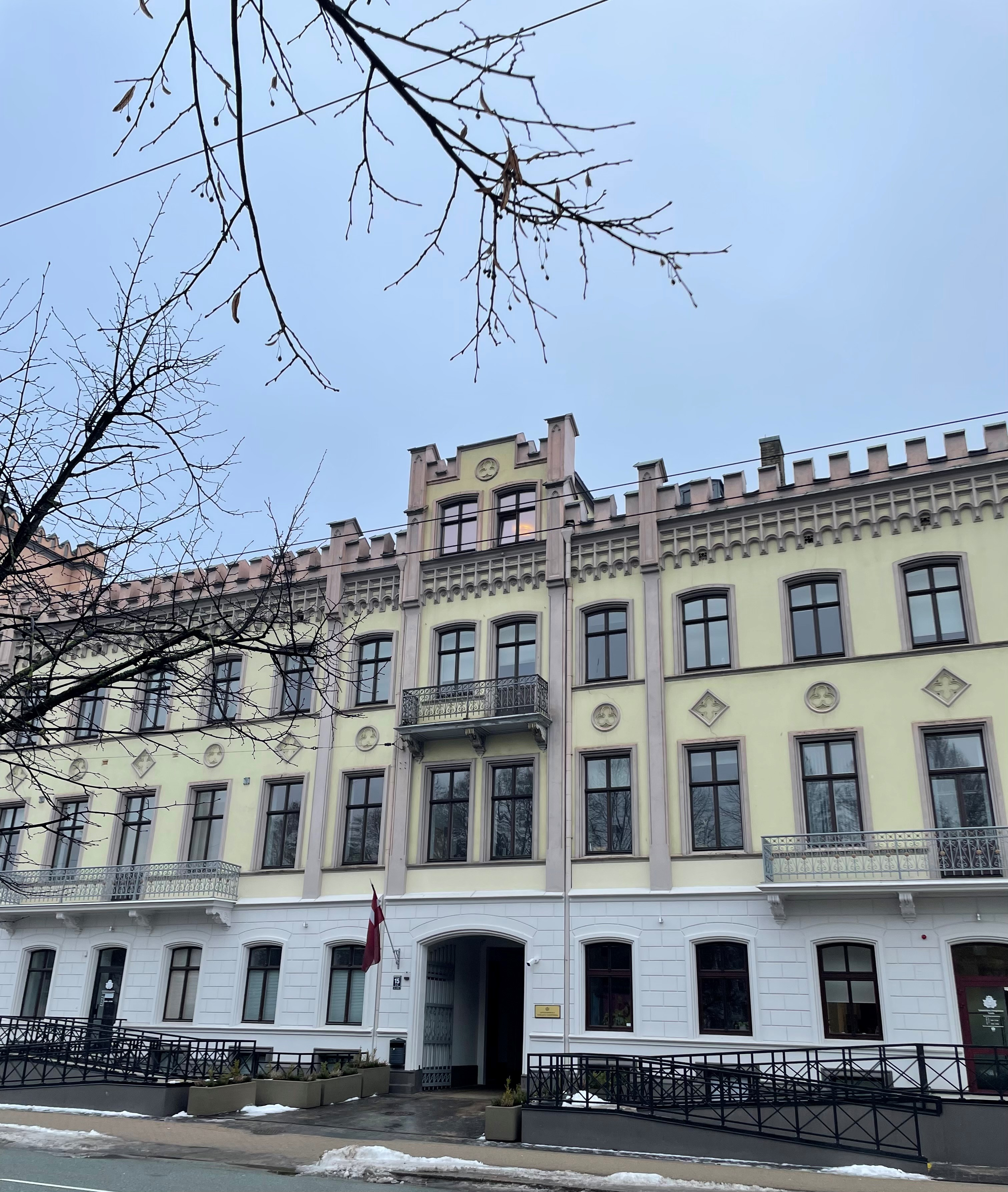
- Offices of the State Language Center
- Abbreviation: VVC
- Formation: 1992
- Location: Eksporta iela 6, Riga, Latvia
- Director: Māris Baltiņš
- Deputy director: Inese Bursevica
- Website: vvc.gov.lv

Latvian State Language Centre (VVC; Latvian: Valsts valodas centrs) is a direct administration institution subordinated to the Minister of Justice of the Republic of Latvia. The purpose of the State Language Centre is to implement the national policy on the use of the official language - Latvian.

The Centre supervises and controls the conformity with laws and regulations on the use of official language, provides the State administration institutions and the public with official translations of laws and regulations and other documents issued by the State or international organisations while concurrently ensuring use of consistent terminology. The State Language Centre protects rights and interests of the official language users, promotes the regularisation of the cultural environment of language and promotes comprehensive functioning of the Latvian language.

== Law on Languages – 1989 ==
On 5 May 1989 the Latvian Soviet Socialist Republic Law on Languages was adopted, restoring the status of Latvian that it had before the Soviet occupation of Latvia in 1940. This Law prescribes:

1. Latvian language as the official language in accordance with the Constitution of the Latvian Soviet Socialist Republic;
2. the use of Latvian and other languages at the level of administration, national economy and social activities as well as citizens’ rights to choose between the languages, and protection of languages.

== Latvian Language as a State Language – 1998 ==
On 6 January 1998 the Latvian language was once again prescribed as the official language in the Constitution of the Republic of Latvia – 10 years after it was declared the official language.

== Functions ==
Since 1993 State Language Centre supervises the conformity with the laws and regulations on the official language use, ensures the maintenance, protection and development of the Latvian language. State Language Centre was assigned additional functions in 2009 after its merger with Translation and Terminology Centre. State Language Centre has the following functions:

- supervise the compliance with laws and regulations in the field of the use of the official language;
- protect the rights and interests of the official language users;
- determine the use of official language in the fields of the State and public life in the cases set out in laws and regulations;
- promote regularisation of the cultural environment of language, in particular through restoration and protection of toponyms typical of the State;
- promote fully effective functioning of the Latvian language in European Union (EU) institutions;
- perform official translations into Latvian of conventions and international agreements relevant to the Republic of Latvia, as well as of documents related to the enforcement of the European Union legislation;
- translate the laws and regulations of the Republic of Latvia into languages of the EU Member States;
- translate into Latvian documents related to the operation of North Atlantic Treaty Organization (NATO);
- prepare proposals on the use of consistent terminology that corresponds with the Latvian language rules, in the laws and regulations;
- draw up and develop methodology for translation of laws and regulations.

== Structure ==
The work of the Centre is led by the director of the Centre. After the approval of the candidacy by the Cabinet, the director of the Centre is appointed by the Minister for Justice. The current director of the State Language Centre is Dr. habil. med. Māris Baltiņš, and the deputy director – Madara Rēķe. The State Language Centre consists of three departments - the Administrative, Language Control and Terminology and Legal Translation.

== Administrative Department ==
Administrative department is responsible for the organization of the administrative matters (personnel, legal matters, record keeping, management of information systems) as well as prepares and executes necessary documentation.

== Language Control Department ==
Language Control Department consists of two branches – Riga Branch of the Language Control Department and Regional Branch of the Language Control Department. Language Control Department has the following functions:

- exercise control over the compliance with the laws and regulations on the use of the official language;
- take measures to protect the rights and interests of the user of the official language in cases of violating the Official Language Law and other laws and regulations;
- examine cases on administrative violations and to impose administrative fines according to the procedure set out in the laws and regulations.

== Terminology and Legal Translation Department ==
Terminology and Legal Translation Department (and Legal Translation Division), within the scope of their functions, participates in the translation process of the legal acts of the Republic of Latvia, documentation related to the NATO) and other international legal acts. The department prepares and issues various methodological materials and other guidelines to ensure the quality of translations. Terminology and Legal Translation Department have the following functions:

- control the quality of the translations done by the State Language Centre;
- edit the translations done by the State Language Centre;
- investigate terminology and maintain a terminology database;
- prepare methodological guidelines for legal translation;
- provide quality assessment of administrative institutions’ translations;
- assist administrative institutions with the preparation of suggestions for amendments in EU legal act projects and official publications;
- participates in meetings held by translation departments of EU institutions regarding issues in terminology;
- advise on the matters concerning the use of language and terminology.

== Latvian Language Expert Commission ==
The Latvian Language Expert Commission, on a regular basis, examines the compliance of norms provided for in laws and regulations to regularities of the Latvian language, codifies norms of the literary language, provides opinions on various language issues, for example, the use of capital letters in the names of establishments, the spelling of internationally recognised names of countries and territories, the spelling of house names and numbers, the spelling of addresses, the spelling of languages and language groups in the Latvian language in compliance with the requirements of ISO 639-2 etc. The Commission has prepared several draft legal acts and has participated in the formation of the normative basis for the Official Language Law. The Latvian Language Expert Commission has two sub-commissions: Sub-commissions for Place- names and Latgalian Written Language.

== Calendar Names Expert Commission ==
The Calendar Names Expert Commission deals with the person names and their inclusion into the calendar.

== Sources ==
1. By-law of the State Language Centre Revised: 3 June 2015
2. Iskolat Decree on the Use of Latvian Language
3. The State Language Centre (2002) Implementation of Language Policy in Latvia The State Language Centre. Rīga SI. Pages 3, 4, 9, 10, 11, 18, 26.
4. Vaira Vīķe-Freiberga, Raimonds Apinis, Ludmila Azarova, Māris Baltiņš. Latviešu valoda 15 neatkarības gados. Rīga : Zinātne, 2007. 85. lpp. ISBN 978-9984-767-94-9.
5. «About the State Language Centre» (in Latvian). The State Language Centre. Accessed on: 21 April 2015
6. By-laws of the public agency “Tulkošanas un terminoloģijas centrs”. Revised: 3 June 2015
7. “On reorganization of the public agency “Tulkošanas un terminoloģijas centrs”. Latvijas Vēstnesis (No. 42). 17 March 2009 Revised: 21 April 2015
8. Valsts valodas centra reglaments. Revised: 3 June 2015
9. Publications of the State Language Centre Revised: 3 June 2015
10. Publications Revised: 3 June 2015
11. https://web.archive.org/web/20150711105851/http://termini.vvc.gov.lv/. Revised: 3 June 2015
