= 2nd Saeima =

Parliament of Latvia 1922–1925

Second Saeima of the Republic of Latvia: 2. Latvijas Republikas Saeima

History
- Founded: 3 November 1925
- Disbanded: 5 November 1928
- Preceded by: 1st Saeima
- Succeeded by: 3rd Saeima

Leadership
- Speaker of the Saeima: Frīdrihs Vesmanis (until 17 March 1925); Pauls Kalniņš (from 20 March 1925)

Structure
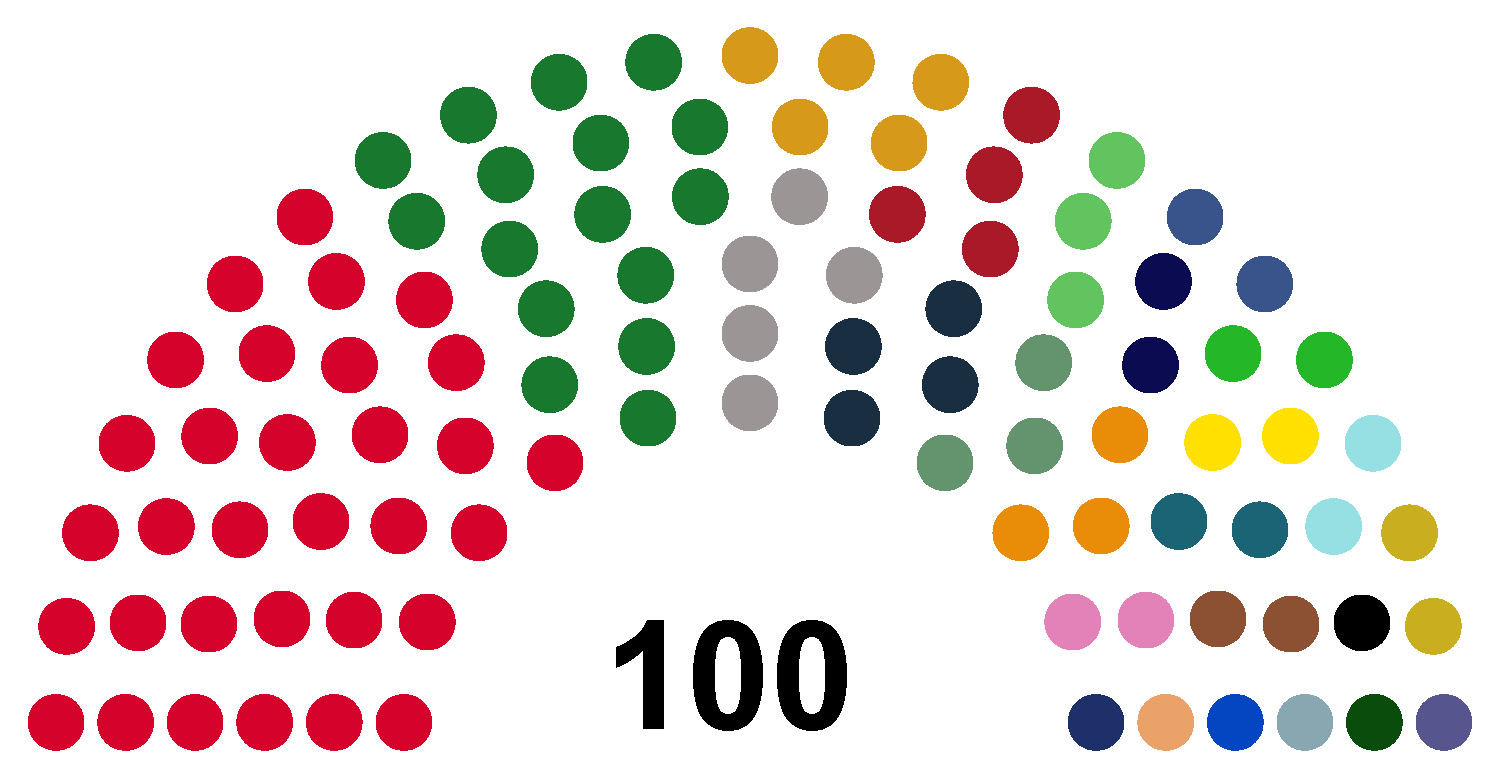

2nd Saeima was the parliament of Latvia from 3 November 1925, until 5 November 1928. The Social Democrat Pauls Kalniņš continued to hold the post of Speaker of the Saeima to which he was first elected during the 1st Saeima.

2nd Saeima gave confidence to the second cabinet of Kārlis Ulmanis (24 December 1925 – 6 May 1926), cabinet of Arturs Alberings (7 May 1926 – 18 December 1926), the first cabinet of Marģers Skujenieks (19 December 1926 – 23 January 1928) and cabinet of Pēteris Juraševskis (24 January 1928 – 30 November 1928).

== Elections and parties ==
The 2nd Saeima elections were held on 3–4 October 1925, and 74,89% of eligible voters participated. Due to the liberal elections law, 27 parties and candidates lists were elected to the 100 seats, representing all the political and ethnic interest groups of Latvia.

- Latvian Social Democratic Workers' Party – 32 seats
- Latvian Farmers' Union – 16 seats
- Democratic Centre and Independents union – 5 seats
- Latgalian Christian Peasant and Catholic Party – 5 seats
- Committee of the German Baltic Parties – 4 seats
- Union of Social Democrats – Mensheviks and Rural Workers – 4 seats
- National Union – 3 seats
- New Farmers-Small Landowners Party – 3 seats
- New Farmers' Union – 3 seats
- Independent national center – 3 seats
- Agudas Israel – 2 seats
- The United List of Latgalian Labour Party and Latgalian small-holder and landless Union – 2 seats
- Christian National Union – 2 seats
- Latgalian Democrat Party – 2 seats
- Latgalian Farmers Party – 2 seats
- Peace, order and production Union – 2 seats
- Russian Orthodox and Russian organizations Bloc – 2 seats
- Polish-Catholic Latvian Union of Poles – 2 seats
- Old Believer Central Committee – 2 seats
- Ceire Cion – 1 seat
- Independent candidate – 1 seat
- Mizrachi – 1 seat
- Congress of War ravaged districts – 1 seat
- Union of Russian Officials – 1 seat
- Latgalian Non-party Union – 1 seat
- National Farmers Union – 1 seat
- Latvia’s Jewish socialdemocratic workers party Bund – 1 seat

== List of Saeima deputies ==
- Arturs Alberings
- Alfrēds Alslēbens
- Jānis Annuss
- Longins Ausējs
- Kristaps Bahmanis
- Jānis Balodis
- Voldemārs Bastjānis
- Ernests Bauers
- Arveds Bergs
- Roberts Bīlmanis
- Jānis Blumbergs
- Ādolfs Bļodnieks
- Jānis Breikšs
- Augusts Briedis
- Kristaps Bungšs
- Kārlis Būmeisters
- Hugo Celmiņš
- Jūlijs Celms
- Fēlikss Cielēns
- Jānis Čakste
- Kārlis Dēķens
- Kārlis Dišlers
- Morduhs Dubins
- Roberts Dukurs
- Hugo Dzelzītis
- Antons Dzenis
- Arkādijs Eglītis
- Kristaps Eliass
- Hermanis Enzeliņš
- Aleksandrs Evans
- Jūlijs Ērglis
- Vilhelms Firkss
- Markus Gailītis
- Jānis Goldmanis
- Eduards Grantskalns
- Ernests Gulbis
- Kārlis Gulbis
- Jānis Ģībietis
- Jons Hāns
- Vilis Holcmanis
- Eduards Jaunzems
- Staņislavs Jubuls
- Ivans Jupatovs
- Pēteris Juraševskis
- Jānis Kalējs
- {Meletijs Kaļistratovs
- Ringolds Kalnings
- Augusts Kalniņš
- Bruno Kalniņš
- Nikolajs Kalniņš
- Pauls Kalniņš
- Hermanis Kaupiņš
- Karls Kellers
- Ādolfs Klīve
- Pēteris Kotans
- Andrejs Krastkalns
- Kārlis Krievs
- Bernhards Kublinskis
- Kārlis Kvellbergs
- Alberts Kviesis
- Krišs Ķūķis
- Kārlis Lauva
- Maksis Lazersons
- Pauls Lejiņš
- Rūdolfs Lindiņš
- Francis Logins
- Klāvs Lorencs
- Noijs Maizels
- Fricis Menders
- Gotfrīds Mīlbergs
- Ernests Morics
- Oto Nonācs
- Mordehajs Nuroks
- Jānis Opincāns
- Lukass Ozoliņš
- Alfons Pastors
- Kārlis Pauļuks
- Andrejs Petrevics
- Jānis Pommers
- Eduards Radziņš
- Rainis
- Antons Rancāns
- Jezups Rancāns
- Gustavs Reinhards
- Miķelis Rozentāls
- Jānis Rubulis
- Vladislavs Rubulis
- Ansis Rudevics
- Jānis Rudzis
- Marģers Skujenieks
- Pauls Šīmanis
- Leontijs Špoļanskis
- Jānis Šterns
- Elpidifors Tihoņickis
- Francis Trasuns
- Jezups Trasuns
- Kārlis Ulmanis
- Pēteris Ulpe
- Ādolfs Valters
- Andrejs Veckalns
- Jānis Veržbickis
- Jaroslavs Viļpiševskis
- Jānis Višņa
- Ruvins Vitenbergs
- Pēteris Zeibolts
- Francis Zeps
