= 1st Saeima =

Parliament of Latvia 1922–1925

First Saeima of the Republic of Latvia: 1. Latvijas Republikas Saeima

History
- Preceded by: Constitutional Assembly of Latvia
- Succeeded by: 2nd Saeima

Leadership
- Speaker of the Saeima: Frīdrihs Vesmanis (until 17 March 1925); Pauls Kalniņš (from 20 March 1925)

Structure
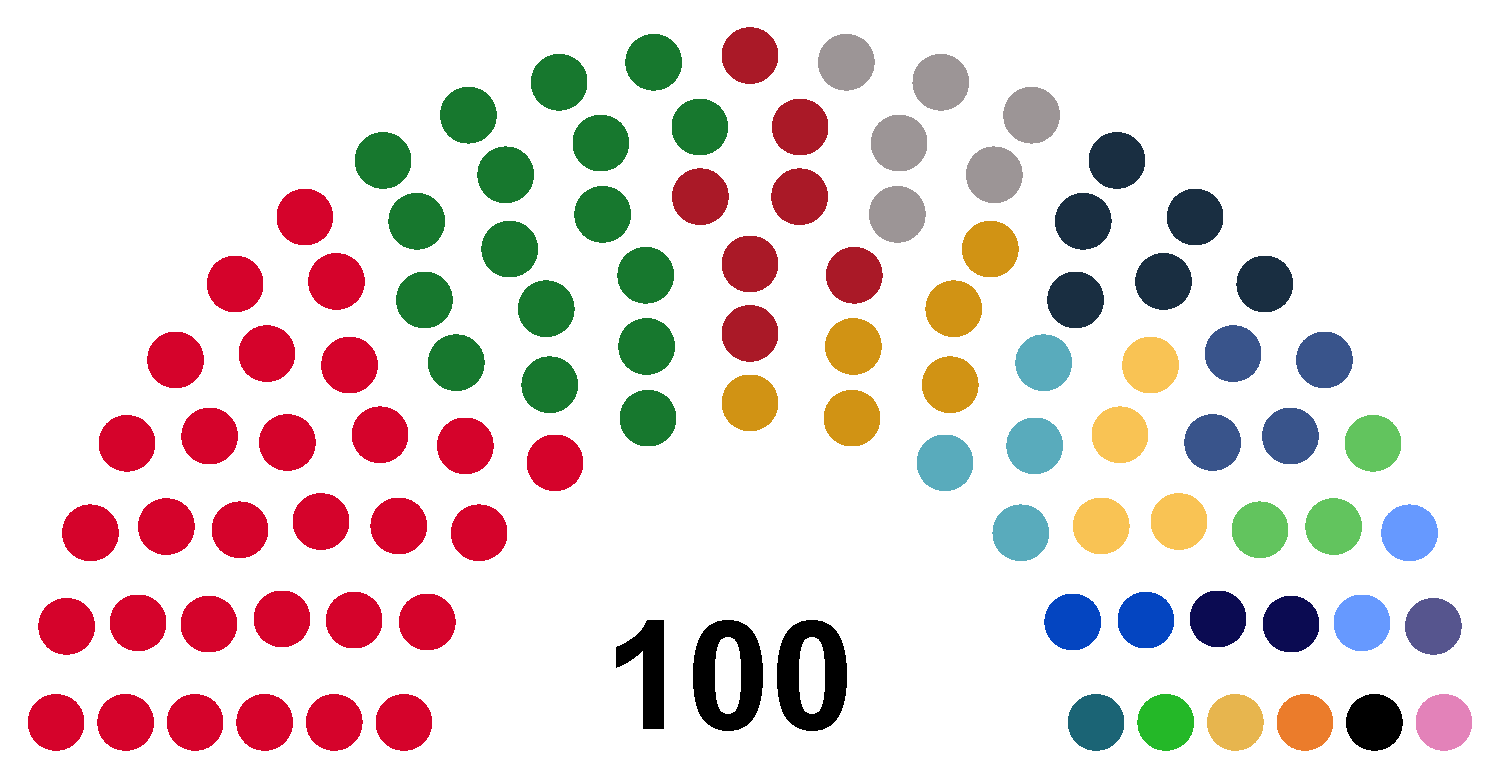

The 1st Saeima was the parliament of Latvia from 7 November 1922 until 2 November 1925. It was the first Saeima to be elected after the Constitutional Assembly of Latvia had created the Constitution of Latvia and the Elections Law.

Social-Democrat Frīdrihs Vesmanis was Speaker of the Saeima until 17 March 1925 followed by Social Democrat Pauls Kalniņš.

The 1st Saeima gave confidence to the 1st cabinet of Zigfrīds Anna Meierovics (20 July 1922 – 26 January 1923), cabinet of Jānis Pauļuks (27 January 1923 – 27 June 1923), 2nd cabinet of Meierovics (28 June 1923 – 26 January 1924), cabinet of Voldemārs Zāmuēls (25 January 1924 – 17 December 1924) and the 1st cabinet of Hugo Celmiņš (19 December 1924 – 23 December 1925).

== Elections and parties ==
1st Saeima elections were held on 7–8 October 1922 and 82,2% (800,840 people) of eligible voters participated. Due to the liberal Elections law, 20 parties were elected to the 100 seats, representing all the political and ethnic interest groups of Latvia. Of the 100 MPs, 84 were Latvians, 62 had a higher education, 22 had a secondary education, 7 had graduated from teacher training colleges and 9 had a primary education.

- Latvian Social Democratic Workers' Party – 30 seats
- Latvian Farmers' Union – 17 seats
- Union of Social Democrats – Mensheviks and Rural Workers – 7 seats
- Democratic Centre and Independents Union – 6 seats
- Latgalian Christian Peasant and Catholic Party – 6 seats
- Committee of the German Baltic Parties – 6 seats
- Non-Partisan National Center – 4 seats
- Christian National Union – 4 seats
- Latgalian Farmer-Labour Party – 4 seats
- New Farmers' Union– 3 seats
- United List of Russians – 2 seats
- Agudas Israel – 2 seats
- Jewish National Bloc– 2 seats
- Latgalian People's Party – 1 seat
- Latgalian Farmers Party – 1 seat
- List of Lithuanians and Catholics – 1 seat
- Central Union of Old Believers – 1 seat
- Ceire Cion – 1 seat
- Jewish socialist Bund – 1 seat
- United Polish Parties – 1 seat

== List of Saeima deputies ==
First Saeima deputies list.

1. Arturs Alberings
2. Kristaps Bahmanis
3. Viktors Barkāns
4. Voldemārs Bastjānis
5. Ernests Bauers
6. Arveds Bergs
7. Pēteris Berģis
8. Ernests Birkhāns
9. Alfrēds Birznieks
10. Roberts Bīlmanis
11. Aleksandrs Bočagovs
12. Augusts Briedis
13. Kristaps Bungšs
14. Ansis Buševics
15. Kārlis Būmeisters
16. Hugo Celmiņš
17. Jūlijs Celms
18. Fēlikss Cielēns
19. Jānis Čakste
20. Kārlis Dēķens
21. Morduhs Dubins
22. Jānis Ducens
23. Roberts Dukurs
24. Antons Dzenis
25. Kristaps Eliass
26. Ernests Felsbergs
27. Manfrēds Fēgezaks
28. Vilhelms Firkss
29. Leopolds Fišmanis
30. Pauls Gailīts
31. Jānis Goldmanis
32. Eduards Grantskalns
33. Teodors Grīnbergs
34. Ernests Gulbis
35. Kārlis Gulbis
36. Jons Hāns
37. Vilis Holcmanis
38. Kārlis Irbe
39. Roberts Ivanovs
40. Eduards Jaunzems
41. Staņislavs Jubuls
42. Jānis Kalējs
43. Meletijs Kallistratovs
44. Ringolds Kalnings
45. Arvīds Kalniņš
46. Augusts Kalniņš
47. Bruno Kalniņš
48. Nikolajs Kalniņš
49. Pauls Kalniņš
50. Kārlis Kasparsons
51. Karls Kellers
52. Francis Kemps
53. Ādolfs Klīve
54. Egons Knops
55. Pēteris Koreckis
56. Pēteris Kotans
57. Bernards Kublinskis
58. Alberts Kviesis
59. Jēkabs Ķullīts
60. Maksis Lazersons
61. Pauls Lejiņš
62. Rūdolfs Lindiņš
63. Klāvs Lorencs
64. Noijs Maizels
65. Jānis Mazvērsīts
66. Zigfrīds Meierovics
67. Fricis Menders
68. Ernests Morics
69. Oto Nonācs
70. Markus Nuroks
71. Kārlis Ozoliņš
72. Kārlis Pauļuks
73. Andrejs Petrevics
74. Jānis Purgalis
75. Eduards Radziņš
76. Rainis-Jānis Pliekšāns
77. Jezups Rancāns
78. Gustavs Reinhards
79. Jezups Roskošs
80. Miķelis Rozentāls
81. Jezups Rubulis
82. Vladislavs Rubulis
83. Ansis Rudevics
84. Jānis Rudzis
85. Teofils Rudzītis
86. Voldemārs Salnājs
87. Hermanis Salnis
88. Visvaldis Sanders
89. Pēteris Siecenieks
90. Andrejs Sīmanis
91. Kārlis Skalbe
92. Marģers Skujenieks
93. Pauls Šīmanis
94. Francis Trasuns
95. Jezups Trasuns
96. Kārlis Ulmanis
97. Pēteris Ulpe
98. Andrejs Veckalns
99. Antons Velkme
100. Jānis Veržbickis
101. Fridrihs Vesmanis
102. Jānis Vesmanis
103. Jānis Višņa
104. Ruvins Vitenbergs
105. Pēteris Zeibolts
106. Gustavs Zemgals
