= 3rd Saeima =

Parliament of Latvia 1928–1931

3rd Saeima was the parliament of Latvia from 6 November 1928 until 2 November 1931. Social Democrat Pauls Kalniņš continued to hold the post of Speaker of the Saeima to which he was first elected during the 1st Saeima.

3rd Saeima gave confidence to the 2nd cabinet of Hugo Celmiņš (1 December 1928 – 26 March 1931), and the 3rd cabinet of Kārlis Ulmanis (27 March 1931 – 5 December 1931).

== Elections and parties ==
3rd Saeima elections were held on 6–7 October 1928 and 79.35% of eligible voters participated. Due to the liberal Elections law, 27 parties and candidates lists were elected to the 100 seats, representing all the political and ethnic interest groups of Latvia.

- Social Democrats – 25 seats
- Latvian Farmers’ Union – 16 seats
- Committee of the German Baltic Parties – 6 seats
- Latgalian Christian Peasant and Catholic Party – 6 seats
- Workers and Peasants Party – 6 seats
- Christian Union and Workers Party – 4 seats
- New Farmers-Small Landowners Party – 4 seats
- Democratic Centre and Independents union – 3 seats
- Latgalian Democratic Peasant Party – 3 seats
- Progressive People’s Union – 3 seats
- Union of Social Democrats – Mensheviks and Rural Workers, New Farmers and Craftsmen – 2 seats
- United Old Believers list – 2 seats
- Mizrachi – 2 seats
- Latgalian Independent Socialist Party – 2 seats
- National Union – 2 seats
- Russian district and activist united list – 2 seats
- Russian Orthodox and Old Believers voters and united Russian organizations list – 2 seats
- Polish-Catholic Latvian Union of Poles – 2 seats
- Lost money deposits and other victims Party – 1 seat
- Agudas Israel– 1 seat
- Christian Working Peoples Union – 1 seat
- Union of Latgalian Latvians and land plowers Party – 1 seat
- Latgalian Social Democratic Workers Party – 1 seat
- Labour League of Latvia – 1 seat
- Peace, order and production Union – 1 seat
- Ceire Cion – 1 seat
- Latvia’s Jewish socialdemocratic workers party Bund – 1 seat
