= 4th Saeima =

Parliament of Latvia 1931–1934

Fourth Saeima of the Republic of Latvia: 4. Latvijas Republikas Saeima

History
- Preceded by: 3rd Saeima
- Succeeded by: People's Parliament (Tautas Saeima)

Leadership
- Speaker of the Saeima: Pauls Kalniņš

Structure
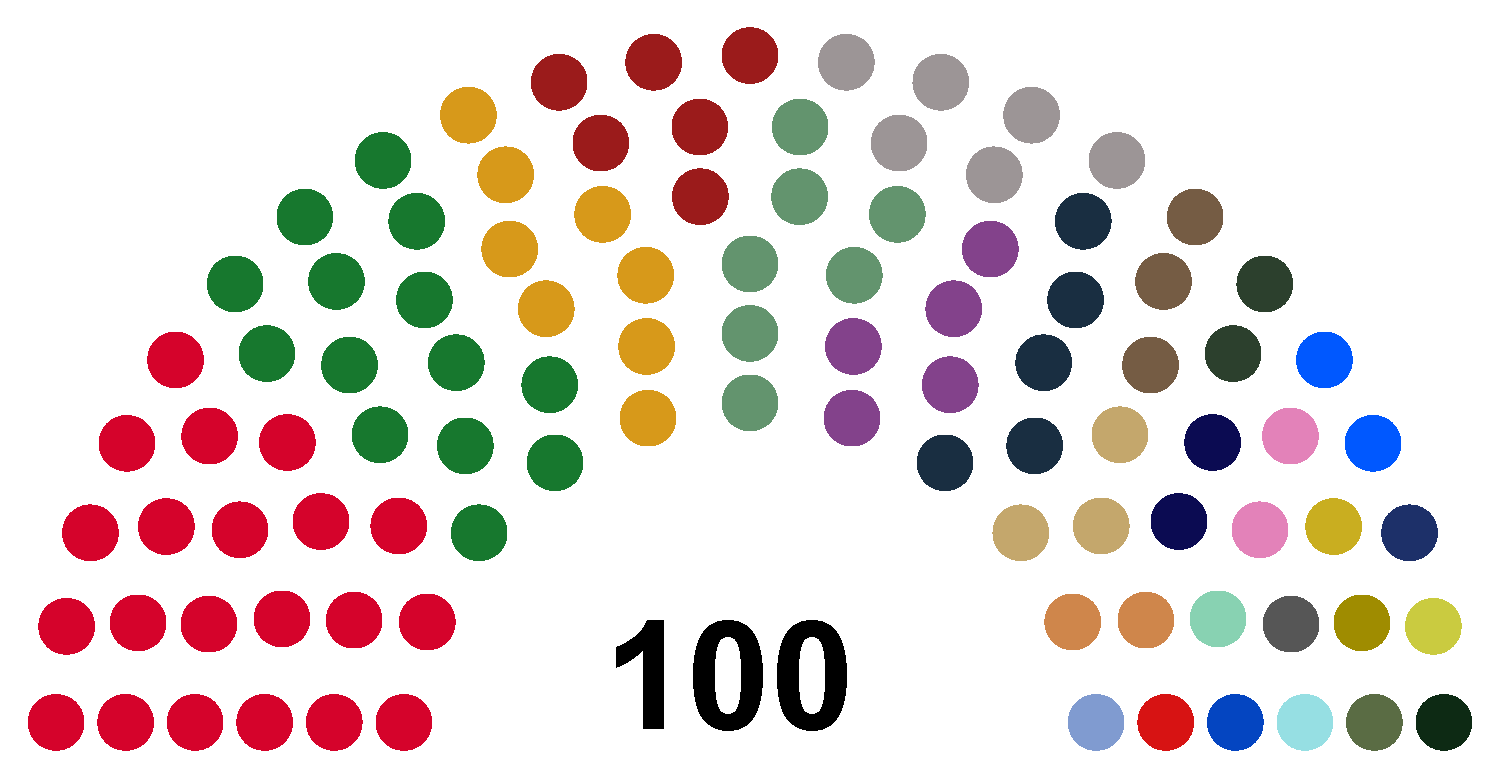

4th Saeima was the parliament of Latvia from 3 November 1931 until the 15 May 1934 Latvian coup d'état. It was the last democratically elected Saeima until the restoration of Latvia’s independence in 1991 and the 5th Saeima elections in 1993.

Social Democrat Pauls Kalniņš continued to hold the post of Speaker of the Saeima to which he was first elected during the 1st Saeima. During November 1933 – May 1934 Saeima discussed proposed Constitutional changes, submitted by Kārlis Ulmanis and his Farmers’ Union, that would reduce number of MPs from 100 to 50, allow for the direct popular election of State President and increase his powers.

4th Saeima gave confidence to the 2nd cabinet of Marģers Skujenieks (6 December 1931 – 23 March 1933), cabinet of Ādolfs Bļodnieks (24 March 1933 – 16 March 1934) and the 4th cabinet of Kārlis Ulmanis (17 March 1934 – 15 May 1934).

== Elections and Parties ==
4th Saeima elections were held on 3–4 October 1931 and 80,04% of eligible voters participated. Due to the liberal Elections law, 27 parties and candidates lists were elected to the 100 seats, representing all the political and ethnic interest groups of Latvia. Of the 100 elected MPs, 1 was a woman, 83 were Latvians, 43 had a higher education, 39 had a secondary education, 12 had been educated at people's schools, 3 at military schools, 1 at an agricultural school, 1 at a trade school, and 1 was self-educated.

- Latvian Social Democratic Workers' Party – 21 seats
- Latvian Farmers’ Union – 14 seats
- Latgalian Christian Peasant and Catholic Party – 8 seats
- New Farmers-Small Landowners Party – 7 seats
- Trade Union Workers and Peasants Group – 6 seats
- Democratic Centre and Independents union – 6 seats
- Latgalian Farmer-Labour Party – 5 seats
- Committee of the German Baltic Parties – 5 seats
- Christian National Union – 3 seats
- Progressive Union – 3 seats
- Party of lost money depositors and other victims – 2 seats
- Agudas Israel – 2 seats
- The New Farmers' Alliance – 2 seats
- Russian Old Believers Working Peoples Party – 2 seats
- United Polish Parties – 2 seats
- Russian Orthodox and Old Believers voters and united Russian organizations list – 2 seats
- Zionist Mizrahi – 1 seat
- Trade Association of Railwaymen, Government Employees, Craftsmen and Workers – 1 seat
- Association of Russian Peasants and Russian Public Workers – 1 seat
- Union of Christian and Working Peoples – 1 seat
- Union of Latgalian Latvians and Land plowers Party – 1 seat
- Labour League of Latvia – 1 seat
- Russian Public Workers' Association – 1 seat
- Workers and Poor peasants list – 1 seat
- Peace, order and production Union – 1 seat
- Riga German Vidzeme list – 1 seat
