= 1928 Latvian parliamentary election =

← 1925	6–7 October 1928	1931 →
Party	Leader	Vote %	Seats	+/–
LSDSP	Pauls Kalniņš	24.34	25	−7
LZS	Kārlis Ulmanis	14.97	16	0
LKZKP	Jāzeps Rancāns	6.17	6	+1
LTU		5.61	5	New
ADP	Paul Schiemann	4.66	6	+2
LJSP		4.03	4	+1
LDZA		3.17	3	+1
PTA	Jezups Trasuns	2.79	3	+1
KNS		2.72	4	+2
LNSP		2.43	2	New
NA	Arveds Bergs	2.26	2	−1
Old Believers	Meletijs Kaļistratovs	1.95	2	0
Democratic Centre		1.89	3	−2
Party of the Orthodox	Jānis Pommers	1.83	2	0
ZPwŁ	Jan Wierzbicki	1.74	2	0
Mizrachi		1.63	2	+1
MKRA		1.58	1	−1
LPAPKDS	Leontin Spoliansk	1.57	2	+1
ANNCCP		1.52	1	New
LDSTA		1.38	1	+1
SDML	Marģers Skujenieks	1.27	2	−2
Agudas Israel	Mordehai Dubin	1.06	1	−1
Ceire Cion	Max Lazerson	0.81	1	0
LSDSP		0.68	1	New
LDS		0.63	1	New
Bund	Noah Meisel	0.57	1	0
KDLS		0.48	1	+1
This lists parties that won seats. See the complete results below.
Prime Minister before	Prime Minister after
Pēteris Juraševskis; Democratic Centre	Hugo Celmiņš; LZS

Parliamentary elections were held in Latvia on 6 and 7 October 1928. The Latvian Social Democratic Workers' Party remained the largest party, winning 25 of the 100 seats.

== Electoral system ==
For the elections the country was divided into five constituencies, electing a total of 100 MPs using proportional representation (an increase from 97), with the three seats that had previously been awarded to the parties with the highest vote totals that had failed to win a seat in any of the five constituencies were scrapped.

The list system used was made flexible, as voters were able to cross out candidates' names and replace them with names from other lists, a system 32% of voters took advantage of. Whilst previously parties needed only collect 100 signatures to register for an election, the system was changed for this election, with a deposit of 1,000 lats introduced, which was only refunded if parties won a seat. Combined with the scrapping of the three compensatory seats, this had the effect of reducing the number of registering parties, which fell from 141 to 120. Of the 120, only 66 contested the election.

== Results ==
Party	Votes	%	Seats	+/–
Latvian Social Democratic Workers' Party	226,340	24.34	25	–7
Latvian Farmers' Union	139,173	14.97	16	0
Latgalian Christian Peasant and Catholic Party	57,336	6.17	6	+1
Left Trade Unions	52,136	5.61	5	New
Committee of the German Baltic Parties	43,352	4.66	6	+2
New Farmers-Small Landowners Party	37,435	4.03	4	+1
Latgalian Progressive Party	29,449	3.17	3	+1
Progressive People's Union	25,902	2.79	3	+1
Christian National Union	25,254	2.72	4	+2
Independent Socialists	22,570	2.43	2	New
National Union	20,978	2.26	2	–1
United List of Old Believers	18,150	1.95	2	0
Democratic Centre	17,604	1.89	3	–2
Party of the Orthodox	17,006	1.83	2	0
Polish-Catholic Latvian Union of Poles	16,197	1.74	2	0
Mizrachi	15,145	1.63	2	+1
Party for Peace and Order	14,736	1.58	1	–1
Russian Public Workers' Association	14,592	1.57	2	+1
Party of Former Money Depositors	14,096	1.52	1	New
Labour League of Latvia	12,820	1.38	1	+1
Union of Social Democrats – Mensheviks and Rural Workers	11,774	1.27	2	–2
Agudas Israel	9,827	1.06	1	–1
New Farmers' Union	7,545	0.81	0	–3
Ceire Cion	7,529	0.81	1	0
National People's Association	7,213	0.78	0	New
Women's Union	6,443	0.69	0	0
Latgalian Social Democrats	6,327	0.68	1	New
Latgalian Latvian Union	5,853	0.63	1	New
Economic Centre, Dischargees, Traders and Industrialists' List	5,656	0.61	0	New
Bund	5,302	0.57	1	0
Radical Democrats	5,247	0.56	0	New
Economic Association	5,179	0.56	0	New
Union of Christian and Working People	4,484	0.48	1	+1
United Farmers	4,346	0.47	0	New
Association of Russian Farmers	3,976	0.43	0	New
Jewish Democratic Bloc	2,496	0.27	0	New
List of Lithuanians and Catholics	2,268	0.24	0	New
Latgalian Russian Small and Landless Farmers' List	2,068	0.22	0	New
Independent Farmers of Latgale and Workers' List	1,922	0.21	0	New
Orthodox and Public Workers' List	1,535	0.17	0	New
People's Work Party List	1,232	0.13	0	New
People's Rights and Health Defenders List	723	0.08	0	New
Jewish Economic Bloc	667	0.07	0	New
Total	929,883	100.00	100	0
Valid votes	929,883	99.22		
Invalid/blank votes	7,324	0.78		
Total votes	937,207	100.00		
Registered voters/turnout	1,182,426	79.26		
Source: Nohlen & Stöver
