= 1922 Latvian parliamentary election =

← 1920	7–8 October 1922	1925 →
- All 100 seats in the Saeima; 51 seats needed for a majority
- Turnout: 83.14%
Party	Leader	Vote %	Seats	+/–
LSDSP	Jānis Pliekšāns	30.56	30	−27
LZS	Kārlis Ulmanis	16.77	17	−9
Democratic Centre	Jānis Čakste	7.26	6	New
SDML	Marģers Skujenieks	6.26	7	New
LKZKP	Jāzeps Rancāns	5.96	6	0
ADP	Paul Schiemann	5.32	6	0
KNS	Gustavs Reinhards	4.17	4	New
BNC	Arveds Bergs	3.72	4	New
LZDP	Jezups Trasuns	3.50	4	New
ENB		2.10	2	New
JS	Oto Nonācs	1.94	3	New
VJS		1.80	2	New
APP		1.58	1	0
Old Believers	Meletijs Kaļistratovs	1.56	1	New
Agudas Israel	Mordehai Dubin	1.44	2	New
LZP		1.08	1	−16
LKS		1.07	1	+1
LTA		0.86	1	New
Ceire Cion	Max Lazerson	0.65	1	0
Bund	Noah Meisel	0.30	1	New
This lists parties that won seats. See the complete results below.
Prime Minister before	Prime Minister after
Zigfrīds Anna Meierovics; LZS	Zigfrīds Anna Meierovics; LZS

Parliamentary elections were held in Latvia on 7 and 8 October 1922. The Latvian Social Democratic Workers' Party remained the largest party, winning 30 of the 100 seats.

== Electoral system ==
For the elections the country was divided into five constituencies, electing a total of 97 MPs using proportional representation. The three remaining seats were awarded to the parties with the highest vote totals that had failed to win a seat in any of the five constituencies.

The list system used was made flexible, as voters were able to cross out candidates' names and replace them with names from other lists. However, only 19.97% of voters made any changes to the lists. To register a list for the election parties needed only collect 100 signatures. A total of 88 lists registered, but only 43 contested the election. There was no voter roll, but instead passports were used to identify voters.

== Results ==
Party	Votes	%	Seats	+/–
Latvian Social Democratic Workers' Party	241,947	30.56	30	–27
Latvian Farmers' Union	132,764	16.77	17	–9
Democratic Centre	57,438	7.26	6	New
Union of Social Democrats – Mensheviks and Rural Workers	49,595	6.26	7	New
Latgalian Christian Peasant and Catholic Party	47,202	5.96	6	0
Committee of the German Baltic Parties	42,088	5.32	6	0
Christian National Union	33,043	4.17	4	New
Non-Partisan National Centre	29,457	3.72	4	New
Latgalian Farmer-Labour Party	27,697	3.50	4	New
Jewish National Bloc	16,631	2.10	2	New
New Farmers' Union	15,392	1.94	3	New
United List of Russians	14,229	1.80	2	New
United Polish Parties	12,473	1.58	1	0
Latvian Old Believers' Central Committee	12,318	1.56	1	New
Agudas Israel	11,429	1.44	2	New
Latgalian Farmers Party	8,522	1.08	1	–16
List of Lithuanians and Catholics	8,490	1.07	1	+1
Latgalian People's Party	6,771	0.86	1	New
Ceire Cion	5,156	0.65	1	0
Fishermens' Union	4,008	0.51	0	New
Land Workers' Association	2,667	0.34	0	New
Bund	2,409	0.30	1	New
Latgalian Workers' Association	1,918	0.24	0	New
Belarusian List	1,548	0.20	0	New
Independent Russian Association	1,479	0.19	0	New
War Invalids' List	1,230	0.16	0	New
Independent Colonel Jansons	1,181	0.15	0	New
Estonian Group	1,063	0.13	0	New
Abstainers' List	1,031	0.13	0	New
Latgalian Villagers	467	0.06	0	New
Jewish People's Party	47	0.01	0	New
Total	791,690	100.00	100	–50
Valid votes	791,690	98.86		
Invalid/blank votes	9,168	1.14		
Total votes	800,858	100.00		
Registered voters/turnout	963,257	83.14		
Source: Nohlen & Stöver
