= 1925 Latvian parliamentary election =

← 1922	3–4 October 1925	1928 →
- All 100 seats in the Saeima; 51 seats needed for a majority
- Turnout: 74.88%
Party	Leader	Vote %	Seats	+/–
LSDSP	Jānis Pliekšāns	31.37	32	+2
LZS	Kārlis Ulmanis	15.03	16	−1
LKZKP	Jāzeps Rancāns	5.32	5	−1
ADP	Paul Schiemann	5.08	4	−2
Democratic Centre		3.81	5	−1
SDML	Marģers Skujenieks	3.61	4	−3
National Union	Arveds Bergs	3.31	3	−1
Old Believers	Meletijs Kaļistratovs	2.50	2	+1
LPP		2.42	2	New
JS	Oto Nonācs	2.23	3	0
ZPwŁ	Jan Wierzbicki	2.11	2	New
LDP	Jezups Trasuns	1.91	2	−2
KNS	Gustavs Reinhards	1.77	2	−2
LJSP	Ādolfs Bļodnieks	1.73	3	New
MKRA		1.68	2	New
Agudas Israel	Mordehai Dubin	1.62	2	0
LZP		1.59	2	+1
NZS	Kārlis Kvelbergs	1.40	1	New
KPSDAS	Leontin Spolianski	1.28	1	New
Mizrachi	Mordechai Nurock	1.27	1	New
Party of the Orthodox	Jānis Pommers	1.23	2	New
IAKAS		1.18	1	New
LBS		0.87	1	New
Ceire Cion	Max Lazerson	0.77	1	0
Bund	Noah Meisel	0.69	1	0
This lists parties that won seats. See the complete results below.
Prime Minister before	Prime Minister after
Hugo Celmiņš; LZS	Kārlis Ulmanis; LZS

Parliamentary elections were held in Latvia on 3 and 4 October 1925. The Latvian Social Democratic Workers' Party remained the largest party, winning 32 of the 100 seats.

== Electoral system ==
For the elections the country was divided into five constituencies, electing a total of 97 MPs using proportional representation. The three remaining seats were awarded to the parties with the highest vote totals that had failed to win a seat in any of the five constituencies.

The list system used was made flexible, as voters were able to cross out candidates' names and replace them with names from other lists. However, only 26.03% of voters made any changes to the lists. To register a list for the election parties needed only collect 100 signatures. A total of 141 lists were registered, although only 93 competed.

== Results ==
Party	Votes	%	Seats	+/–
Latvian Social Democratic Workers' Party	260,987	31.37	32	+2
Latvian Farmers' Union	125,070	15.03	16	–1
Latgalian Christian Peasant and Catholic Party	44,231	5.32	5	–1
Committee of the German Baltic Parties	42,248	5.08	4	–2
Democratic Centre	31,680	3.81	5	–1
Union of Social Democrats – Mensheviks and Rural Workers	30,025	3.61	4	–3
National Union	27,553	3.31	3	–1
Old Believers	20,843	2.50	2	+1
Latgalian Progressive Party	20,131	2.42	2	New
New Farmers' Union	18,552	2.23	3	0
Polish-Catholic Latvian Union of Poles	17,537	2.11	2	New
Latgalian Labour Party	15,926	1.91	2	–2
Christian National Union	14,736	1.77	2	–2
New Farmers-Small Landowners Party	14,372	1.73	3	New
Party for Peace and Order	13,948	1.68	2	New
Agudas Israel	13,477	1.62	2	0
Latgalian Farmers Party	13,203	1.59	2	+1
National Farmers' Union	11,614	1.40	1	New
Russian Public Workers' Association	10,662	1.28	1	New
Mizrachi	10,544	1.27	1	New
Party of the Orthodox	10,245	1.23	2	New
Congress of Destroyed Areas	9,814	1.18	1	New
Latgalian Non-Partisan Union	7,247	0.87	1	New
Ceire Cion	6,422	0.77	1	0
Labour League of Latvia	6,309	0.76	0	New
Bund	5,733	0.69	1	0
United Citizens' List	4,138	0.50	0	New
Union of Christian and Working People	3,530	0.42	0	New
War Invalids' List	3,496	0.42	0	0
LDP	3,331	0.40	0	New
Jewish National Democratic Party	2,723	0.33	0	New
United List of Latgalian United Workers, Craftsmen, Small Landholders and Labour Intelligentsia	2,250	0.27	0	New
Democrats Union	1,977	0.24	0	New
Union of Latvian Belarusian Landless Farmers, Workers and Small Peasant Citizens	1,910	0.23	0	New
Union of Riga Outskirts	1,139	0.14	0	New
Histadruth-Hacionith	971	0.12	0	New
Latgalian Group of Working People	916	0.11	0	New
LZSI	874	0.11	0	New
Estonian Group	605	0.07	0	0
Latvian National Workers' Party	515	0.06	0	New
Russian People's Workers' Party	241	0.03	0	New
Salmins	182	0.02	0	New
Independent Non-Partisan Economic Group of Latvia	178	0.02	0	New
Total	832,085	100.00	100	0
Valid votes	832,085	99.21		
Invalid/blank votes	6,610	0.79		
Total votes	838,695	100.00		
Registered voters/turnout	1,120,026	74.88		
Source: Nohlen & Stöver
