= 1931 Latvian parliamentary election =

← 1928	3–4 October 1931	1940 →
Party	Leader	Vote %	Seats	+/–
LSDSP	Pauls Kalniņš	19.23	21	−4
LZS	Kārlis Ulmanis	12.25	14	−2
LKZKP	Jāzeps Rancāns	8.16	8	+2
SZP		6.33	6	+1
Democratic Centre		6.24	6	+3
LJSP	Ādolfs Bļodnieks	5.79	7	+3
LZPA	Jezups Trasuns	5.04	5	+2
ADP	Paul Schiemann	4.01	5	−1
PA	Marģers Skujenieks	2.27	3	New
KNS	Gustavs Reinhards	2.19	3	−1
ANNCCP		2.12	2	+1
KVDTP		2.12	2	New
JZA		1.96	2	New
Agudas Israel	Mordehai Dubin	1.84	2	+1
APP		1.75	2	New
MKRA		1.57	1	0
Party of the Orthodox	Jānis Pommers	1.25	1	−1
Mizrachi	Mordechai Nurock	1.22	1	−1
LPAPKDS	Leontin Spolianski	1.09	1	−1
Orthodox Voters		1.05	1	New
LDSTA		0.92	1	0
SNZ		0.87	1	New
KZAKSDF		0.86	1	New
NSZS		0.63	1	New
DVDASAA		0.62	1	New
LDS		0.61	1	0
KDLS		0.50	1	0
This lists parties that won seats. See the complete results below.
Prime Minister before	Prime Minister after
Kārlis Ulmanis; LZS	Marģers Skujenieks; PA

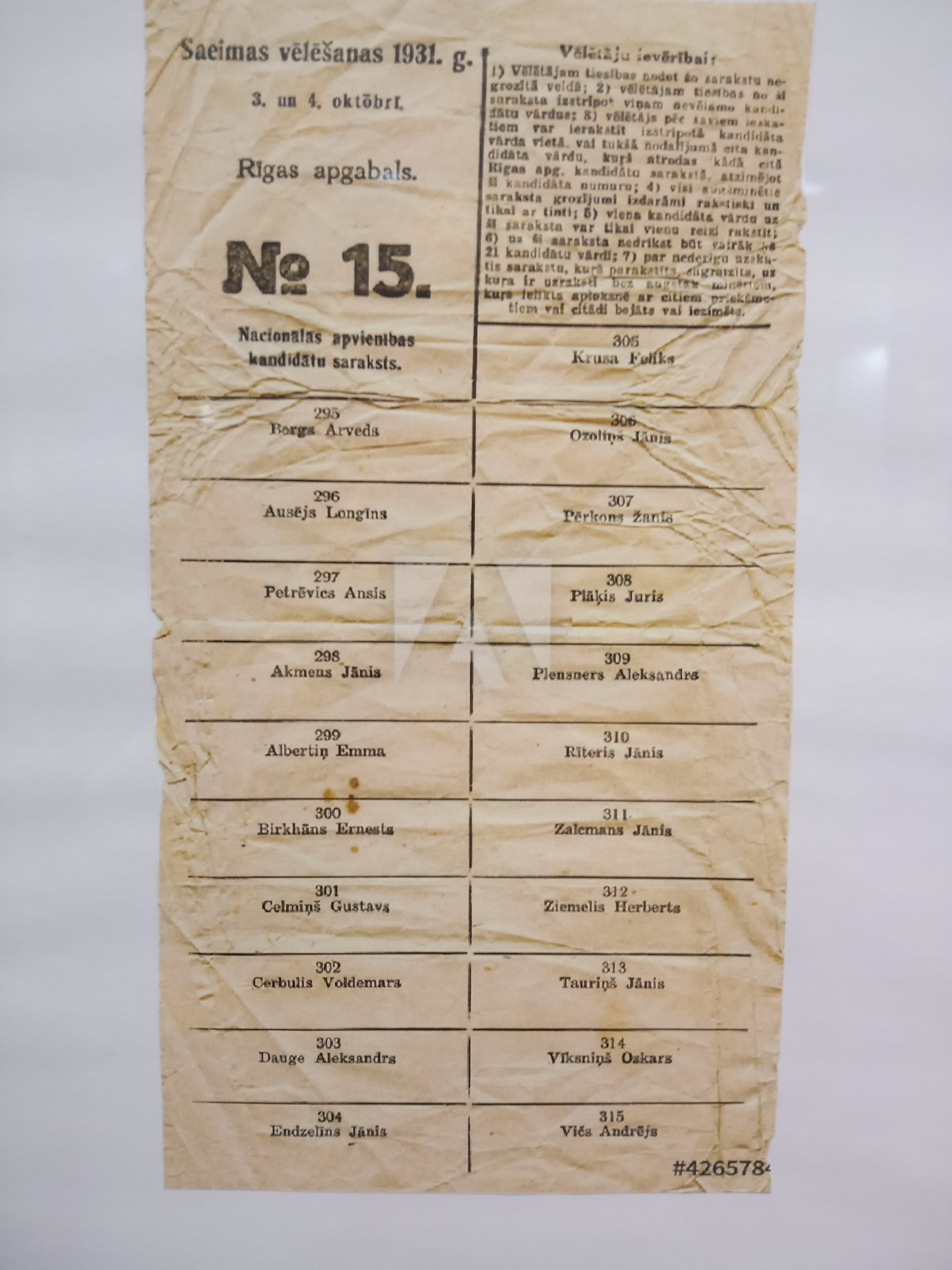
Example of ballot paper from Riga constituency

Parliamentary elections were held in Latvia on 3 and 4 October 1931. The Latvian Social Democratic Workers' Party remained the largest party, winning 21 of the 100 seats. They were the last elections held under the Constitution of Latvia before the 1934 coup d'état and the last competitive elections held under Latvian law until 1993.

== Electoral system ==
For the elections the country was divided into five constituencies, electing a total of 100 MPs using proportional representation. The list system used was made flexible, as voters were able to cross out candidates' names and replace them with names from other lists, a system 35% of voters took advantage of. Although 103 lists registered for the election, the number of competing lists dropped from 66 to 46.

== Results ==
Party	Votes	%	Seats	+/–
Latvian Social Democratic Workers' Party	186,000	19.23	21	–4
Latvian Farmers' Union	118,443	12.25	14	–2
Democratic Centre	60,397	6.24	6	+3
Latgalian Christian Peasant and Catholic Party	78,881	8.16	8	+2
Trade Union Workers and Peasants Group	61,272	6.33	6	+1
New Farmers-Small Landowners Party	56,021	5.79	7	+3
Latgalian Farmer-Labour Party	48,795	5.04	5	+2
Committee of the German Baltic Parties	38,805	4.01	5	–1
Progressive Association	21,929	2.27	3	New
Christian National Union	21,208	2.19	3	–1
Party of Former Money Depositors	20,528	2.12	2	+1
Russian Orthodox and Voters of Labour Nation	20,528	2.12	2	New
New Farmers' Association	18,981	1.96	2	New
Agudas Israel	17,845	1.84	2	+1
United Polish Parties	16,928	1.75	2	New
Party for Peace and Order	15,192	1.57	1	0
Party of the Orthodox	12,107	1.25	1	–1
Mizrachi	11,761	1.22	1	–1
National Union	11,100	1.15	0	–2
Women's Union	10,634	1.10	0	0
Russian Public Workers' Association	10,556	1.09	1	–1
Orthodox Voters	10,166	1.05	1	New
Labour League of Latvia	8,851	0.92	1	0
Association of Russian Peasants and Russian Public Workers	8,298	0.86	1	New
Workers and Poor Peasants	8,378	0.87	1	New
List for Riga Germans for Vidzeme	6,138	0.63	1	New
Trade Association of Railwaymen, Government Employees, Craftsmen and Workers	5,976	0.62	1	New
Latgalian Latvian Union	5,882	0.61	1	0
Ceire Cion	5,274	0.55	0	–1
United List of New Farmers – Small Landowners Party, Economic Centre and Dischargees	5,065	0.52	0	New
Bund	5,044	0.52	0	–1
Union of Christian and Working People	4,840	0.50	1	0
Polish-Catholic Latvian Union of Poles	4,202	0.43	0	–2
United List of Zemgale Jews	3,700	0.38	0	New
Old Believers	3,857	0.40	0	–2
Progressive Union and Democratic Centre	3,786	0.39	0	New
Unsatisfied New Farmers, Small Landholders and Fishermen	3,288	0.34	0	New
Courlanders' Association	3,094	0.32	0	New
Progressive Peasants and New Peasants of Zemgale	3,109	0.32	0	New
Lithuanian Catholics and Belarusians	3,105	0.32	0	New
Jewish Progressive Association	2,116	0.22	0	New
Association of Latvian Tenants	1,806	0.19	0	New
Latvian Social Democratic Opposition Workers	1,778	0.18	0	New
Latgalian Land Ploughmen, Radical Democrats and Soldier Liberators	1,556	0.16	0	New
Total	967,220	100.00	100	0
Valid votes	967,220	99.30		
Invalid/blank votes	6,855	0.70		
Total votes	974,075	100.00		
Registered voters/turnout	1,217,914	79.98		
Source: Nohlen & Stöver
