= Jewish National Bloc =

Latvian political alliance

The Jewish National Bloc (Latvian: Ebreju nacionālais bloks) was a political alliance in Latvia in the 1920s. It consisted of Histadruth Hacionith, the Jewish National Democratic Party and Mizrachi.

== History ==
The bloc contested the 1920 Constitutional Assembly elections as the Jewish Bloc, winning five seats. For the 1922 parliamentary elections it changed its name to the Jewish United National Bloc (Žīdu apvienotais nacionālais bloks), but won only two seats in the 1st Saeima. The bloc was later disbanded, with the three parties contesting the 1925 parliamentary elections alone. Mizrachi won a single seat in the 2nd Saeima, whilst the other two failed to pass the electoral threshold.

== See also ==
- Jews in Latvia
- Agudas Israel
- Ceire Cion
