= Ruvins Vitenbergs =

Latvian politician

Former member of Saeima

Personal details
- Born: January 8, 1868 Russian Empire, Vitebsk Governorate, Daugavpils (Today Latvia)
- Died: December 1, 1931 (aged 63)
- Party: Agudas Israel (Latvia)

Ruvins Vitenbergs (January 8, 1868 – December 1, 1931) was a Latvian merchant and politician. A Latvian Jew, he was a member of Agudas Israel. He was a deputy of first and second Saeima, and served in Daugavpils city council. He had never spoken from the rostrum as a Member of the Saeima.

== Politics ==
Vitenberg was a member of political party Agudas Israel in first and second Saeima.
