= 1934 Latvian Insurance Law referendum =

24–25 February 1934

Results
Choice	Votes	%
Yes	385,258	93.23%
No	27,988	6.77%
Valid votes	413,246	99.60%
Invalid or blank votes	1,651	0.40%
Total votes	414,897	100.00%
Registered voters/turnout	1,300,000	31.92%

A referendum on the Insurance Law was held in Latvia on 24 and 25 February 1934. The referendum was initiated by the Latvian Social Democratic Workers' Party and its supporters and asked voters whether they approved of the law "On Provision in cases of old age, disability and unemployment", more commonly known as the Insurance Law. The law would provide social protection for the elderly, disabled and unemployed. Although it was passed by a wide margin, voter turnout was below the necessary threshold and the law was not passed by the Saeima.

== Results ==
Choice	Votes	%
For	385,258	93.2
Against	27,988	6.8
Invalid/blank votes	1,651	–
Total	414,897	100
Source: Nohlen & Stöver
