= Liaužu Bolss =

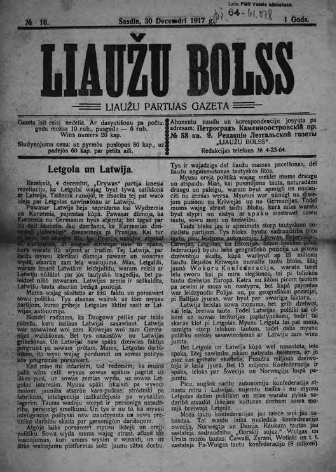
- December 30, 1917 issue of Liaužu Bolss
- Publisher: Francis Kemps
- Editor: Ignats Asāns
- Founded: April 28, 1917
- Ceased publication: 1918
- Political alignment: Latgale Working People's Party
- Language: Latgalian language
- City: Petrograd
- Country: Russia
- Sister newspapers: Jaunō Latgola

Liaužu Bolss ('Voice of the People') was a Latgalian language newspaper published from the Russian capital Petrograd 1917-1918. The first issue of the newspaper was issued on 28 April [O.S. 15 April] 1917. The newspaper was an organ of the Latgale People's Committee, later the Latgale Working People's Party. The editors and publishers of the newspaper were Ignats Asāns and Francis Kemps. The newspaper advocated the formation of a Latgalian autonomous region, separate from the Baltics.

It was initially printed at a clandestine printing house, which also printed Jaunō Latgola ('Young Latgale') issued by the same political grouping. The newspaper was published irregularly. During 1917, sixteen issues were published. In 1918 the printing house was moved to Rēzekne, where it was confiscated. Liaužu Bolss did not appear between mid-February and mid-May 1918.
