= Labour League of Latvia =

Latvian political party

The Labour League of Latvia (Latvian: Latvijas Darba Savienība) was a political party in Latvia. It existed from 1925 until 1934, when all political parties in Latvia were dissolved following a coup d'état. Its political orientation was centre-left, to the left of the Democratic Centre and to the right of the Union of Social Democrats – Mensheviks and Rural Workers.

== Elections ==
The Labour League of Latvia first participated in the 1925 parliamentary elections, receiving 0.76% of the vote and failing to win a seat. In the 1928 elections, it received 1.38% of the vote and won one seat, which went to the economist, Kārlis Balodis. Balodis died on 13 January 1931, during the session of the 3rd Saeima, and his seat was filled by Pēteris Zālīte. In the 1931 elections the Labour League of Latvia received 0.92% of the vote and retained its one seat, which went to Pēteris Zālīte. In 1934 the party was forced to cease its activities, as all political parties in Latvia were dissolved following the 1934 Latvian coup d'état.
