= Zionist Organization (disambiguation) =

Zionist Organization is the former name of the World Zionist Organization

Zionist Organization may also refer to:

- Hadassah, The Women's Zionist Organization of America
- Women's International Zionist Organization
- Zionist Organization of America
- Zionist Organization Mizrachi
