= New Farmers' Union =

Latvian political party

The New Farmers' Union (Latvian: Jaunzemnieku savienība, JS) was a centrist political party in Latvia in the inter-war period, founded by former Latvian Farmers' Union member Oto Nonācs.

== History ==
The party was established by the merger of several parties, and was officially known as the Latvian New Farmers' Union, the List of Non-Partisan New Farmers, Progressive Old Farmers and Labour Intelligentsia. It first contested national elections in 1922, when it won three seats in the 1st Saeima. It went on to retain its three seats in the 2nd Saeima after the 1925 parliamentary elections.

Shortly before the 1928 parliamentary elections it was proposed that the party should merge with the New Farmers-Small Landowners Party (J-S), which had also won three seats in the 1925 elections. Although the merger did not happen, many party members left to join J-S after the party failed to win a seat in the 1928 elections.
