= Agrarian Union of the Landless =

Political party in Latvia

The Agrarian Union of the Landless (Latvian: Bezzemnieku agrārā savienība, BAS) was a political party in Latvia in the early 1920s.

== History ==
The party won three seats in the 1920 Constitutional Assembly elections. Following the elections it was largely absorbed into the Latvian Farmers' Union, but continued to exist as a separate faction within the Union.

In 1925 a breakaway from the Farmers' Union led to the establishment the New Farmers-Small Landowners Party, which had its roots in the BAS. The more radical BAS members remained in the Farmers' Union until 1928, when they also left to join the New Farmers-Small Landowners Party. In 1931 the more radical members left the party to establish the New Farmers' Association, which won two seats in the 1931 elections.
