= "Bund" in Latvia =

Jewish socialist party in Latvia

"Bund" in Latvia Yiddish: „בּונד“ אין לעטלאנד
- Founded: 1919
- Dissolved: c. November 1936
- Split from: Jewish Labour Bund
- Newspaper: Arbeter Shtime
- Ideology: Bundism; Socialism; Jewish Autonomism; Anti-Zionism
- Political position: Left-wing

The "Bund" in Latvia (Yiddish: „בּונד“ אין לעטלאנד, "bund" in letland) was a Jewish socialist party in Latvia between the two World Wars, adhering to the political line of the General Jewish Labour Bund.

== The beginnings of the Latvian Bund ==
In 1919 the branch of the General Jewish Labour Bund in Lithuania, Poland and Russia in Latvia separated itself from the mother party and constituted a separate party of its own. After the conclusion of Latvian War of Independence, in the fall of 1920 a Central Bureau of the Latvian Bund was constituted. The Latvian Bund became an autonomous organization affiliated with the Latvian Social Democratic Workers' Party. The Bund had one seat in the Central Committee of the Latvian Social Democratic Workers Party. The Bund, as well as other left-wing groups in Latvia after the Latvian War of Independence, was under suspicion as Communist supporters. On June 20, 1921 the president of the party Abraham Braun "Sergei" (1881-1940) was sentenced to death by a military tribunal for spreading Communist propaganda but released after international socialist outcry over the sentence.

The relations among Jewish socialists and with the rest of the socialist movement were far better than in Poland; during elections of 1918 two Bundists were elected, then four at the Riga municipal council election in 1919, on a common list of the Social Democratic bloc, which gained 36 of the 96 seats.

The party published the biweekly Di naye tsayt for seven years. The Perecklub movement was the youth wing of the Bund and its students' union was called Zukunft. In 1923 the party began publishing Arbeter Shtime ('Workers Voice').

== 1934 coup and underground struggle ==
The party held its sixth and last congress in Daugavpils on January 27–28, 1934. According to Daniel Blatman, there were 500 active members of the Latvian Bund in 1934.

After the 1934 Latvian coup d'état the Bund aligned with the illegal, underground Socialist Workers and Peasants Party of Latvia (LSSZP). In August 1934 the LSSZP formed a special committee, to lead the underground Jewish socialist movement and Bund activists participated in this committee. The first LZZSP congress, held in July 1935, recognized the Bund as an autonomous organization under the same terms as the Bund had previously aligned with the Latvian Social Democratic Workers Party. In November 1936 Bund activists were arrested.

== The Bundist members of the Latvian Parliament ==
Bilingual Bundist election poster from Latvia, announcing a meeting in 1931 with member of Saeima Dr. Noah Meisel

As pointed out by Frank Gordon, "Between the two world wars Latvia was the only country where the Bund had a parliamentary representative of its own."., and Bund was only one of a few Jewish parties represented in the 1st Saeima, 2nd Saeima, 3rd Saeima and 4th Saeima.

Itzhak Berss (Īzaks Berss), father of Lipman Bers, represented the interests of the Bund in the Constitutional Assembly of Latvia, elected in April 1920. He was later the director of Riga Jewish gymnasium where Yiddish was the language of education. From 1922 until 1934 he was Riga City councilman. He was removed from office after the 1934 Latvian coup d'état on the grounds of "political unreliability". On June 14, 1941 he was arrested and deported by Soviets to Siberia from where he was released only in 1956.

Dr. Noah Meisel, Daugavpils city council member, was subsequently elected for the Bund in the 1st Saeima in 1922, and again in 1925 and 1928, but was not reelected in 1931. He was arrested and deported by the Soviet authorities after the Soviet invasion and annexation of Latvia in 1940 and died in exile in far Northern Russia in 1956.

According to Valdis Lumans, "the leftist Bund more often than not sided with Latvian Social Democratic Workers' Party more than with the Jewish bloc" (comprising Agudath Israel, the Zionists and the Jewish National Democratic Party).

== International affiliation ==
The Latvian Bund had fraternal links with the Social Democratic Bund in Russia. After World War I, the Latvian Bund sent a representative, Raphael Abramovitch, to the Russian Social Democratic Labour Party (Menshevik) delegation at the founding Vienna conference of the International Working Union of Socialist Parties in 1921, where he was particularly active in association with the Menshevik leader Julius Martov. He "emerged as one of the recognized leaders of the Vienna Union".
