= 1920 Latvian Constitutional Assembly election =

- 17–18 April 1920
Party	Leader	Vote %	Seats
LSDSP	Andrejs Petrevics	38.67	57
LZS	Kārlis Ulmanis	17.79	26
Latgalian Farmers Party		10.26	17
ADP	Paul Schiemann	4.54	6
Democrats Union		4.17	6
Workers' Party		3.96	6
LKZKP	Jāzeps Rancāns	3.73	6
BPG		3.36	6
KNS	Gustavs Reinhards	2.28	3
BAS		1.98	3
KPG		1.92	4
Jewish Bloc		1.80	5
LBBMG		1.57	2
Ceire Cion	Max Lazerson	1.16	1
LLP		0.92	1
APP		0.78	1
This lists parties that won seats. See the complete results below.
Results by constituency.
Prime Minister before	Prime Minister after
Kārlis Ulmanis; LZS	Kārlis Ulmanis; LZS

Constitutional Assembly elections were held in Latvia on 17 and 18 April 1920. The Latvian Social Democratic Workers' Party emerged as the largest party in the Constitutional Assembly, winning 57 of the 150 seats. The elections were boycotted by communist parties. The Constitutional Assembly was responsible for drafting a constitution, which was approved on 15 February and promulgated on 7 November 1922.

== Results ==
Party	Votes	%	Seats
Latvian Social Democratic Workers' Party	274,877	38.67	57
Latvian Farmers' Union	126,434	17.79	26
Latgalian Farmers Party	72,961	10.26	17
Committee of the German Baltic Parties	32,256	4.54	6
Democrats Union	29,662	4.17	6
Workers' Party	28,117	3.96	6
Latgalian Christian Peasant and Catholic Party	26,534	3.73	6
Group of Non-Partisan Citizens	23,867	3.36	6
Christian National Union	16,218	2.28	3
Agrarian Union of the Landless	14,078	1.98	3
Russian Citizens Groups	13,651	1.92	4
Jewish Bloc	12,764	1.80	5
Non-Partisan Landless Farmers	11,180	1.57	2
Ceire Cion	8,254	1.16	1
Latgale People Party	6,539	0.92	1
United Polish Parties	5,525	0.78	1
List of Lithuanians and Catholics	2,038	0.29	0
Working Group of Landless Farmers and Workers	1,588	0.22	0
List of Soldier Candidates	1,497	0.21	0
Latgalian Folk United Non-Partisan Group	1,026	0.14	0
List of Revolutionaries and Socialists	724	0.10	0
Women's Union	436	0.06	0
Jews of Ludza	152	0.02	0
Working Group of Jēkabmiests Village	87	0.01	0
Others	424	0.06	0
Total	710,889	100.00	150
Valid votes	709,004	99.73	
Invalid/blank votes	1,930	0.27	
Total votes	710,934	100.00	
Registered voters/turnout	797,662	89.13	
Source: Nohlen & Stöver (Note: The reported number of valid votes was 1,885 less than the total number of votes received by contesting parties.)
