= Party for Peace and Order =

Latvian political party

The Party for Peace and Order was a conservative political party in Latvia during the inter-war period.

== History ==
The party was established in 1925, and won two seats in the second Saima in the 1925 elections. It was reduced to a single seat in the 1928 elections, which it retained in the 1931 elections for the fourth Saeima.

== Ideology ==
The party held similar views to the Landlords' Party in neighbouring Estonia, supporting a classical capitalist economic policy and advocating private property rights. It usually sat in the Saeima alongside the National Union and Christian National Union and some Latgalian parties, in a grouping known as the "National Bloc".
