= Non-Partisan Landless Farmers =

Latvian political party

The Non-Partisan Landless Farmers (Latvian: Bezpartejiskie bezzemnieki, BB), officially the Group of Latvian Non-Partisan Landless and Small Farmers (Latvijas bezpartejisko bezzemnieku un mazsaimnieku grupa), was a political party in Latvia in the early 1920s.

== History ==
The party won two seats in the 1920 Constitutional Assembly elections. However, it did not contest any further national elections.
