= Group of Non-Partisan Citizens =

Latvian political party

The Group of Non-Partisan Citizens (Latvian: Bezpartejiskā pilsoņu grupa, BPG) was a political party in Latvia in the early 1920s.

== History ==
The party won six seats in the 1920 Constitutional Assembly elections, making it the joint fourth-largest faction in the Assembly. However, it did not contest any further elections.
