= List of Lithuanians and Catholics =

Political party in Latvia during the inter-war period

The List of Lithuanians and Catholics (Latvian: Lietuviešu un katoļu saraksts, LKS) was a political party in Latvia in the inter-war period.

== History ==
The party contested the 1920 Constitutional Assembly elections, but failed to win a seat. The 1922 parliamentary elections saw the party win a single seat. The party did not run in the 1925 parliamentary elections, and failed to win a seat when they returned for the 1928 parliamentary elections. Thereafter the LKS did not contest any further national elections.
