= Central Union of Old Believers =

Latvian political party

The Christian Union of Latvian Orthodox, generally known as the Old Believers (Latvian: Vecticībnieki), was a political party in Latvia in the inter-war period. It was led by Meletijs Kaļistratovs.

== History ==
The Latvian Old Believers' Central Committee (Latvijas vecticībnieku centrālā komiteja) first contested national elections in 1922, winning a single seat in the 1st Saeima.

In the 1925 elections, the Vecticībnieki won two seats, which were retained when the United List of Old Believers (Apvienotais vecticībnieku saraksts) won two seats in the 1928 elections. However, both seats were lost when Vecticībnieki failed to win a single seat in the 1931 elections of 4th Saeima.

A second Old Believers group ran as the Orthodox, Old Believers and United Russian Organisation's List (Latvian: Pareizticīgo un vecticībnieku vēlētāju un apvienoto krievu organizāciju saraksts, PVKOS) in the 1925, 1928 and 1931 elections winning some seats.
