= Sociāldemokrats =

Latvian newspaper

Sociāldemokrats was a daily newspaper in interbellum Latvia, the central organ of the Latvian Social Democratic Workers Party.
