= Russian Public Workers' Association =

Latvian political party

The Russian Public Workers' Association was a political group in Latvia during the inter-war period. Primarily representing Russian civil servants of the parishes and counties of Latvia, it was led by Leontijs Špoļanskis (Leontin Spolianski). It was sometimes also known as zemci in Latvian (Russian: земцы, romanized: zemtsy, lit. 'workers of the zemstvo's').

== History ==
The party was initially known as the Union of Russian Officials or the Party for Communal Activities (Krievu pagastu un sabiedrības darbinieku apvienotais saraksts). It won a single seat in the 2nd Saeima in the 1925 elections, and gained a seat in the 1928 elections, by which time it had become the Russian Municipal Workers' Association (Latvijas pagastu un apriņķu pašvaldību krievu darbinieku savienība). The 1931 elections saw it reduced back to a single seat in the 4th Saeima.
