= Latgalian Christian Peasant and Catholic Party =

Latvian political party

The Latgalian Christian Peasant and Catholic Party (Latvian: Latgales kristīgo zemnieku un katoļu partija) was a Christian centrist political party in Latvia during the inter-war period. It was the largest party in the Latgale region, and was led by the bishop Jāzeps Rancāns.

== History ==
Created in January 1920, immediately after the end of Latvian War of Independence as the Christian Union of Latgale Peasants, the party won six seats in the 1920 Constitutional Assembly elections, becoming the joint fourth-largest party in the Constitutional Assembly. It retained its six seats in the 1st Saeima after the 1922 elections, but after changing its name to the Christian Peasants Party, it was reduced to five seats in the 1925 elections. It returned to six seats following the 1928 elections, and won eight seats in the 4th Saeima after the 1931 elections. In August 1933, it changed name to Christian Peasants and Catholics Party.

== Ideology ==
Although the party had a similar platform to the Latvian Farmers' Union and the Christian National Union, it was mainly focussed on the needs of the Catholic population of Latgale. It supported providing compensation to dispossessed landlords, and also supported a Baltic Entente, although it was opposed to any Polish involvement.
