= Rigasche Rundschau =

Defunct German-language newspaper in Latvia

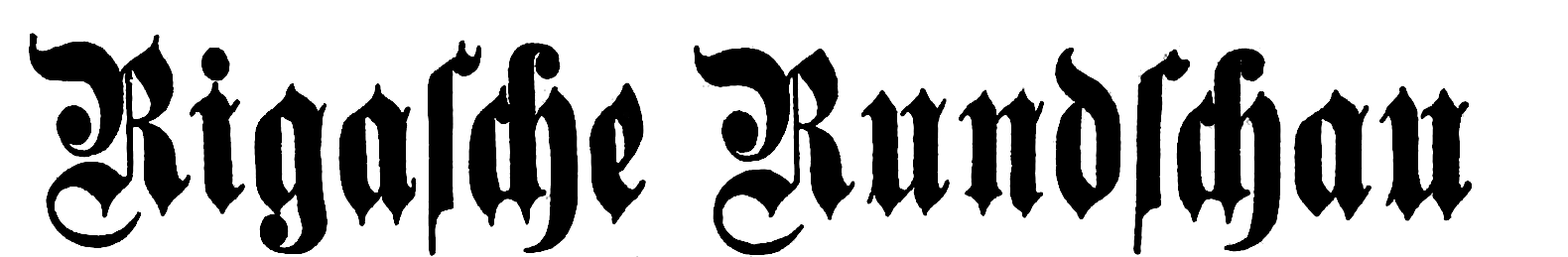
- Type: Daily newspaper
- Founded: 1867
- Language: German
- Ceased publication: 1939
- Headquarters: Riga, Latvia
- Circulation: 20,000 (1914)
- OCLC number: 45423463

Rigasche Rundschau was a daily German language newspaper published in Riga from 1867 until 1939. Widely read and quoted across Europe, it was considered the most important Baltic German newspaper as well as the leading liberal periodical in the Russian Empire and independent Latvia during the interbellum. The newspaper experienced its zenith of influence and popularity under Paul Schiemann, who served as chief editor until his removal by supporters of National Socialism in 1933.

== History ==
Rigasche Rundschau was founded in 1867 by Georg Berkholz and Gustav Keuchel under the name Zeitung für Stadt und Land (Newspaper for City and Country). It had a liberal position and was one of the two most widely circulated German-language newspapers in the Russian Empire, alongside the St. Petersburger Zeitung. As Baltic Germans gradually lost their dominant positions and majority status in Livonian cities throughout the 19th Century, the Rigasche Rundschau took on an increasingly pro-Germanisation stance, though it did not question Livonia's status within the Russian Empire. Consequently, the paper was able to circumvent the ban on German-language press in the First World War and was the only such publication that survived the period. Following the October Revolution, the Rigasche Rundschau was in favor of Latvian independence. The newspaper was finally shut down following the signing of the Molotov–Ribbentrop Pact and the subsequent Nazi–Soviet population transfers in 1939.
