= Constitutional Assembly of Latvia =

Legislative body of Latvia

Constitutional Assembly of the Republic of Latvia Satversmes sapulce

History
- Founded: May 1, 1920
- Disbanded: November 7, 1922
- Preceded by: Creation of parliament
- Succeeded by: 1st Saeima

Leadership
- President: Jānis Čakste
- Secretary: Roberts Ivanovs

Structure
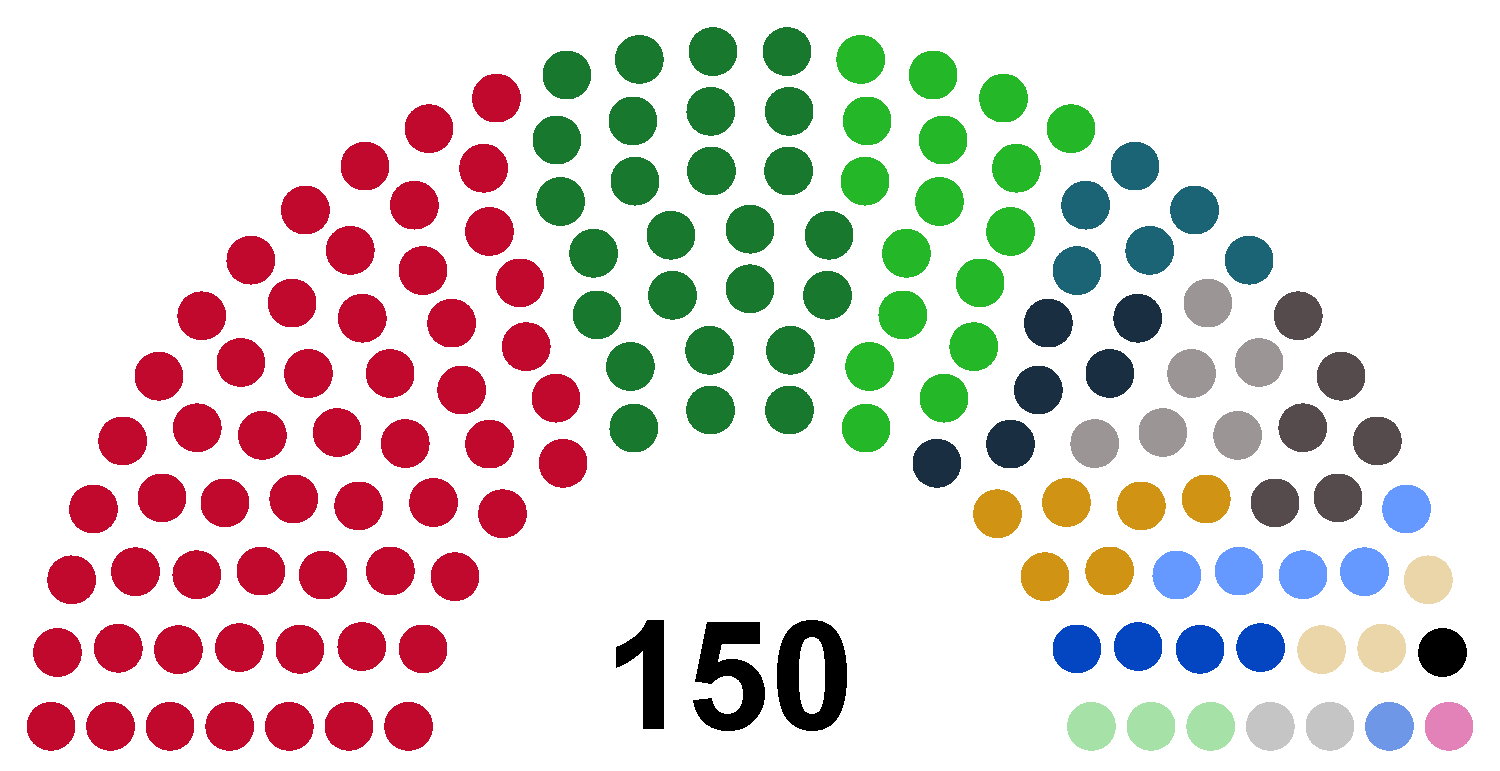

The Constitutional Assembly of Latvia (Latvian: Satversmes sapulce) was independent Latvia's first elected legislative body. Its main task was creating the constitution of Latvia, the Satversme, which is still in effect to this day. The Speaker of Assembly was Jānis Čakste, who later became the first President of Latvia. The assembly functioned from May 1, 1920, until November 7, 1922, when the 1st Saeima convened.

== Electing the Constitutional Assembly ==
On August 19, 1919, People's Council of Latvia issued the law about elections of Constitutional Assembly. Elections were open to male and female citizens who were older than 21, no minimal vote percentage was set, so many small parties were elected.

After the end of Latvian War of Independence in January, 1920 Constitutional Assembly elections were quickly organized and held on April 17–18, 1920 when the people of Latvia voted in universal, equal, direct and proportional elections. 25 parties competed for 150 seats.

84.9% of eligible voters participated (677, 084 people). There were 57 candidate lists covering 5 regional constituencies and 16 parties won seats in the Assembly. One hundred fifty members, including 5 women, were elected. The most successful parties were the Latvian Social Democratic Workers' Party (57 seats), Latvian Farmers' Union (26 seats) and Latgalian Farmers Party (17 seats). The remainder of the seats went mostly to ethnic minorities — Committee of the German Baltic Parties, Democrats Union, Polish Party of Latvia and the Worker's Party, Jewish parties and others.

The first meeting of the Assembly took place on May 1, 1920, at Riga, in the House of the Livonian Noble Corporation which houses Latvian Parliament up to this day. The Constitutional Assembly drafted the basic law of the state — the Satversme — as well as other laws. It adopted a law on agrarian reform, a law on the election of the Saeima (Parliament), laws about the State flag, State coat of arms, national anthem and other laws. The Constitutional Assembly had 21 standing committees. It held 213 plenary sessions and adopted 205 laws and 291 regulations having the force of law.

== List of deputies ==
- Arturs Alberings
- Mārtiņš Antons
- Pauls Ašmanis
- Jānis Bankavs
- Ernests Bauers
- Jānis Beļinskis
- Rūdolfs Benuss
- Kārlis Benze
- Arveds Bergs
- Krišjānis Berķis
- Īzaks Berss
- Andrejs Bērziņš
- Donats Bicāns
- Roberts Bīlmanis
- Jānis Birznieks
- Krišs Birznieks
- Erasts Bite
- Ādolfs Bļodnieks
- Aleksandrs Bočagovs
- Kārlis Bojārs
- Augusts Briedis
- Miķelis Bružis
- Kristaps Bungšs
- Ansis Buševics
- Jānis Cālītis
- Hugo Celmiņš
- Jūlijs Celms
- Zelma Cēsniece-Freidenfelde
- Fēlikss Cielēns
- Ruvins Cvi
- Jānis Čakste
- Jēkabs Dārznieks
- Kārlis Dēķens
- Vilis Dermanis
- Viktors Dombrovskis
- Jānis Druģis
- Morduhs Dubins
- Kārlis Dzelzītis
- Kristaps Eliass
- Vilhelms Firkss
- Leopolds Fišmanis
- Markus Gailītis
- Ignats Gigels
- Jānis Goldmanis
- Jānis Goliass
- Eduards Grantskalns
- Valdis Grēviņš
- Oto Hasmanis
- Jakovs Helmanis
- Vilis Holcmanis
- Kārlis Irbe
- Ēvalds Ivanovs
- Roberts Ivanovs
- Fricis Jansons
- Jēkabs Jansons
- Aleksandrs Jaunbērzs
- Heliodors Jozans
- Klāra Kalniņa
- Augusts Kalniņš
- Bruno Kalniņš
- Miķelis Kalniņš
- Nikolajs Kalniņš
- Pauls Kalniņš
- Staņislavs Kambala
- Kārlis Kasparsons
- Kārlis Kellers
- Juris Kēmanis
- Francis Kemps
- Jezups Kindzulis
- Ādolfs Klīve
- Pēteris Klūge
- Egons Knops
- Dāvids Komisārs
- Pēteris Kotans
- Vincents Kursītis
- Andrejs Kuršinskis
- Alberts Kviesis
- Antons Laizāns
- Pauls Laizāns
- Jakovs Landaus
- Rūdolfs Lapsa
- Apolonija Laurinoviča
- Jezups Laurinovičs
- Roberts Lauris
- Pēteris Lazdāns
- Jānis Lībietis
- Kārlis Lībtāls
- Rūdolfs Lindiņš
- Edvīns Magnuss
- Zigfrīds Meierovics
- Pāvels Meļņikovs
- Fricis Menders
- Pauls Mincs
- Ernests Morics
- Juris Naķelis
- Aleksandrs Neibergs
- Oto Nonācs
- Arons Nuroks
- Staņislavs Ozoliņš
- Arturs Ozols
- Juris Pabērzs
- Roberts Pasils
- Kārlis Pauļuks
- Fjodors Pavlovs
- Andrejs Petrevics
- Elza Pliekšāne (Aspazija)
- Jānis Pliekšāns (Rainis)
- Teodors Plūme
- Emīls Prauliņš
- Vladimirs Presņakovs
- Jānis Purgalis
- Kārlis Puriņš
- Izaks Rabinovičs
- Eduards Radziņš
- Gustavs Reinhards
- Artūrs Reisners
- Juris Riekstiņš
- Miķelis Rozentāls
- Antons Rubins
- Jānis Rubulis
- Ansis Rudevics
- Teofils Rudzītis
- Hermanis Salnis
- Pēteris Sauleskalns
- Indriķis Segliņš
- Valērija Seile
- Pēteris Siecenieks
- Andrejs Sīmanis
- Kārlis Skalbe
- Nikolajs Skangelis
- Emīls Skubiķis
- Marģers Skujenieks
- Eduards Strautnieks
- Juris Strazdiņš
- Fricis Šaberts
- Pauls Šīmanis
- Jānis Šterns
- Arveds Švābe
- Jānis Taube
- Vilis Tode
- Eduards Tomass
- Francis Trasuns
- Jezups Trasuns
- Žano Trons
- Odums Turkopuls
- Kārlis Ulmanis
- Pēteris Ulpe
- Oskars Valdmanis
- Jānis Vārsbergs
- Andrejs Veckalns
- Antons Velkme
- Jānis Velmers
- Fricis Venevics
- Berta Vesmane
- Fridrihs Vesmanis
- Artūrs Vīgants
- Jānis Vilsons
- Jānis Višņa
- Pēteris Zadvinskis
- Voldemārs Zamuels
- Jānis Zankevics
- Pēteris Zeibolts
- Pēteris Zvagulis
- Artūrs Žers
