= United Polish Parties =

Latvian political party

The United Polish Parties (Latvian: Apvienotās poļu partijas), officially the Educational and Charity Associations of Riga and the Polish Association in Latvia, was a political alliance in Latvia for Latvian Poles during the inter-war period.

== History ==
The alliance won a single seat in the 1920 Constitutional Assembly elections. It retained its seat in the 1922 elections, but did not run in the elections in 1925 and 1928. It returned to contest the 1931 elections, winning two seats. The 1931 elections were the last multi-party elections in the country until 1990.
