= United List of Russians =

Latvian political party

The United List of Russians (Latvian: Vienotais krievu saraksts, VKS) was a political party in Latvia in the early 1920s.

== History ==
The party contested the 1920 Constitutional Assembly elections as Russian Citizens Groups (Krievu pilsoņu grupas), winning four seats. Prior to the 1922 elections it became the United List of Russians. The party won two seats in the Saeima, but did not contest any further elections.
