= Latgalian Farmers Party =

Latvian political party

The Latgalian Farmers Party (Latvian: Latgales Zemnieku partija) was a political party in Latvia representing the interests of Latgale farmers during the inter-war period.

== History ==
The party won 17 seats in the 1920 Constitutional Assembly elections, becoming the third-largest party in the Constitutional Assembly. However, the 1922 parliamentary elections saw the party reduced to just a single seat in the 1st Saeima. It won two seats in the 1925 parliamentary elections, but did not contest any further national elections.
