= Latgale People Party =

Latvian political party

The Latgale People Party (Latvian: Latgales Ļaužu partija) was a political party in Latvia in the inter-war period.

== History ==
The party won a single seat in the 1920 Constitutional Assembly elections. However, it did not contest any further national elections.
