= New Farmers-Small Landowners Party =

Latvian political party

The New Farmers-Small Landowners Party (Latvian: Latvijas Jaunsaimnieku un sīkgruntnieku partija) was a political party in Latvia during the inter-war period. It had two wings; the Farmers wing led by Markuss Gailītis and the Landowners wing led by Ādolfs Bļodnieks.

== History ==
The party was established in 1925 as a breakaway from the Latvian Farmers' Union, and had its roots in the Agrarian Union of the Landless (BAS). The BAS had been absorbed into the Farmers' Union following the 1920 Constitutional Assembly elections, but had remained a separate faction within it.

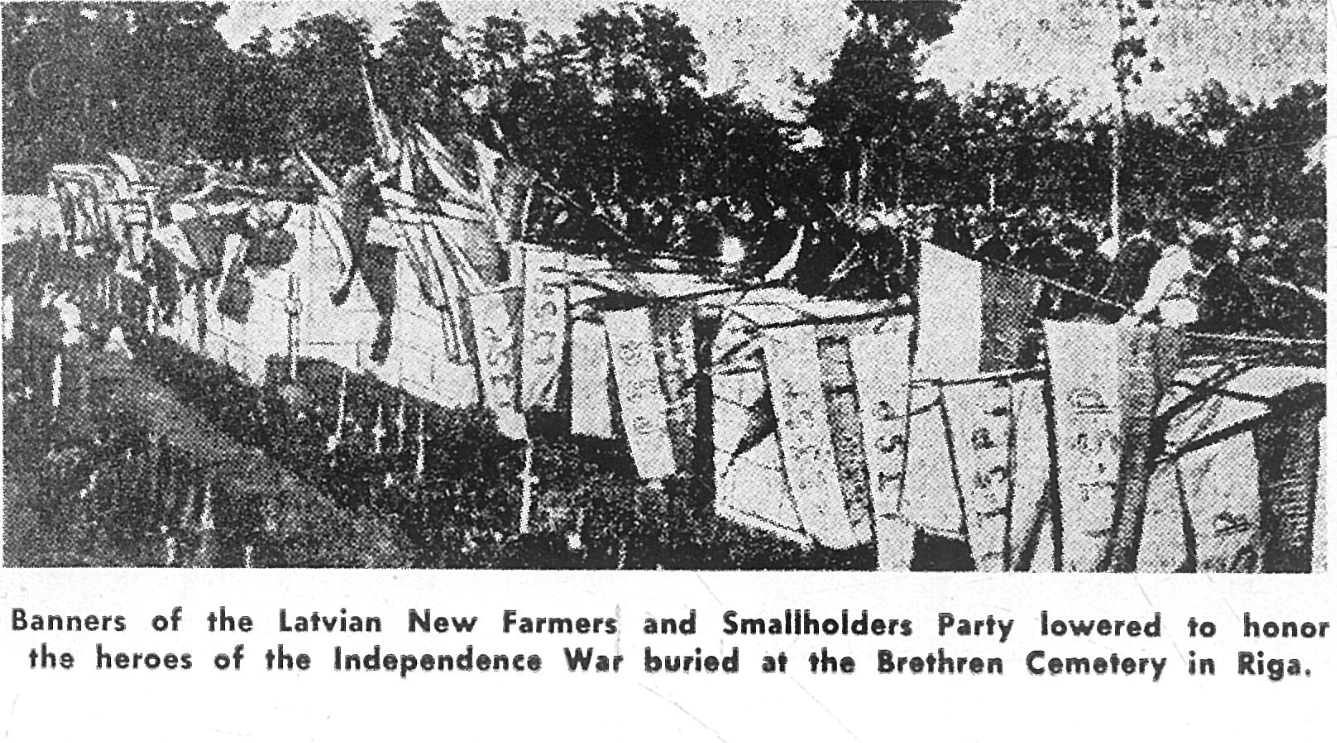
Party flags at the Brothers' Cemetery in Riga, 1920s–30s

In the 1925 elections the new party won three seats. In 1928 it was joined by the more radical members of the BAS, who had remained in the Farmers' Union. The elections that year saw the party win four seats in the 3rd Saeima. However, the radical members split from the party in 1931 to establish the New Farmers' Association. In the elections later that year the New Farmers-Small Landowners Party managed to win seven seats in the 4th Saeima, whilst the New Farmers' Association won two.

== Ideology ==
The party was established to represent farmers and smallholders who had gained land under the 1920 land reform programme that had seen 1,300 landowners dispossessed and 3.7 million hectares of land redistributed. It supported the concept of a Baltic Entente, but took an anti-Polish stance in foreign policy.
