= Tze'irei Zion =

Socialist Zionist youth movement in Eastern Europe

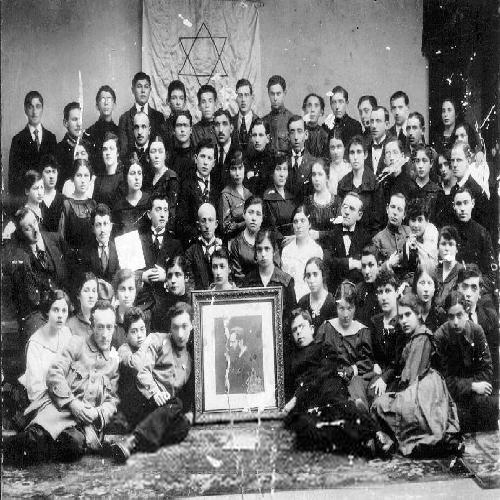
Tze'irei Zion members with a portrait of Theodor Herzl in Vologda, 1911

Tze'irei Zion (Hebrew: צעירי ציון, "Youth of Zion", sometimes spelled as Zeire Zion) was a Labor Zionist youth movement in Eastern Europe in the first half of the 20th century that branched into Ottoman Palestine. The movement originated at the very beginning of the 20th century in the Russian Empire.

The name is also translated as Young Zionists.

Initially Tze'irei Zion was opposed by more radical Zionist and socialist activists from Socialist Revolutionary Party and Bund, who viewed the movement as "reactionary".

Among the major cities with cells of the movement were Chișinău (then known as Kishinev), Warsaw, Vilnius (then also known as Vilna), and Odesa (then known as Odessa), all initially within the Russian Empire and later in Romania, Lithuania and Poland as well after the collapse of the Empire after the Russian Revolution of 1917.

During the 1905 Kishinev Pogrom Tze'irei Zion issued a circular in which it called on the Jewish youth to organize self-defense units.

During the Second Aliyah, many of the members of the movement emigrated to Palestine.

In 1920 there was a major split in the movement due to the difficult circumstances during the Third Conference of the movement in Kharkiv (then known as Kharkov), which happened a week after Poland invaded Ukraine and captured Kyiv (then known as Kiev), due to which a significant number delegates could not attend. The delegates who were present decided to cooperate with Bolshevik Russia and established the Zionist Socialist Party (1920–1926). It operated legally in the Soviet Union, until the clamp-down and emigration of nearly all members to Palestine and joined Ahdut HaAvoda. Another part joined the Hapoel Hatzair Zionist group and operated illegally in the Soviet Union.

A similar left-right split happened in 1923 among the members of the movement which stayed in Poland after the Russian Revolution.

== Notable members ==
- Yisrael Bar-Yehuda
- Aharon Becker
- Yitzhak Coren
- Max Lazerson
- Yosef Sprinzak
