= Latgalian People's Party =

Latvian political party

The Latgalian People's Party (Latvian: Latgales tautas apvienība) was a political party in Latvia in the inter-war period.

== History ==
The party first contested national elections in 1922, when it won a single seat in the parliamentary elections that year. However, it did not contest any further national elections.

== See also ==
- Latgalians (modern)
