= John Pommers =

Latvian politician and archbishop

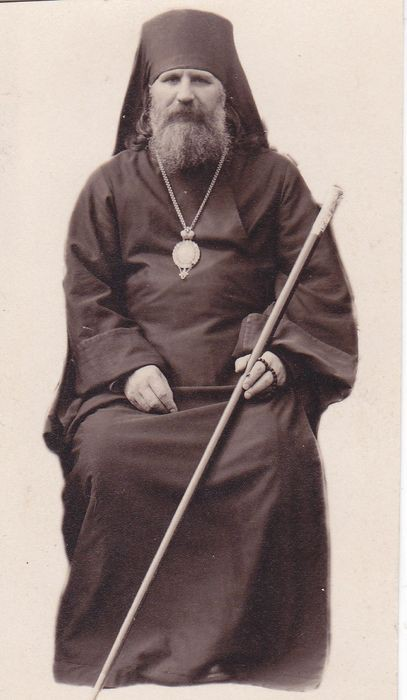
Jānis Pommers

Archbishop John (Latvian: Аrhibīskaps Jānis, Russian: Архиепископ Иоанн, secular name Jānis Pommers or Ivan Andreyevich Pommer, Russian: Иван Андреевич Поммер; 6 (18) January 1876 – 29 September (12 October) 1934) was the first Latvian Archbishop of the Latvian Orthodox Church, serving from 1921 to his assassination in 1934, and a saint of the Eastern Orthodox Church. He was also involved in politics, and was the leader of the Party of the Orthodox.

== Biography ==
Since his great-grandfather his family were Latvian converts to Orthodoxy, which was hoped to help any fears Orthodoxy was too Russian in orientation. He proved significant to the Church and gained its recognition in 1926.

He was elected to the Saeima in the 1925 elections on the Party of the Orthodox list, and was re-elected in 1928 and 1931, serving as an MP from 1925 to 1934. This involved some controversy as the Left feared he was Monarchist while Russian monarchists feared he was a Latvian nationalist.

The Latvian Orthodox Church's Order of the Saint Martyr Archbishop of Riga and Latvia John (Janis Pommers) is named for him.
