= Polish-Catholic Latvian Union of Poles =

Latvian political party

The Polish-Catholic Latvian Union of Poles (Latvian: Poļu-katoļu Latvijas poļu savienība, Polish: Związek Polaków w Łotwie) was a political party in Latvia during the inter-war period. It was led by Jānis Veržbickis (Jan Wierzbicki).

== History ==
The party was established in 1917. The party first contested national elections alone in 1925, when it won two seats in the 2nd Saeima after the parliamentary elections that year. It retained both seats in the 1928 elections, but saw its vote share fall from 1.7% to 0.4% in the 1931 elections, as it lost its representation in the Saeima.
