= Christian National Union (Latvia) =

Latvian political party

The Christian National Union was a political party in Latvia in the inter-war period.

== History ==
The party was established in 1920, and won three seats in the 1920 Constitutional Assembly elections. It went on to win four seats in the 1st Saeima after the 1922 elections, but was reduced to two seats in the 2nd Saeima after the 1925 elections. It won four seats again in the 1928 elections, but only three in the 4th Saeima elections of 1931.

== Ideology ==
The party advocated Lutheranism as the basis for governance and also supported prohibition. The CNU had a similar profile to the nationalist National Union. The party leader Gustavs Reinhards wrote antisemitic articles for the official newspaper Tautas Balss. It usually sat in the Saeima alongside the National Union, the Party for Peace and Order and some Latgalian parties, in a grouping known as the "National Bloc".
