= National Union (Latvia) =

Latvian political party

The National Union (Latvian: Nacionālā apvienība, NA) was a far-right political party in Latvia during the inter-war period. It was led by Arveds Bergs.

== History ==
The party was established in 1919, and contested the 1922 parliamentary elections as the Non-Partisan Independent Centre (Bezpartijiskais nacionālais centrs), winning four seats in the 1st Saeima. Prior to the 1925 elections the party became the National Union, before going on to win three seats in the 2nd Saeima. The 1928 parliamentary elections saw the party reduced to two seats, with both being lost in the 1931 parliamentary elections. The party ceased to exist after 15 May 1934 Latvian coup d'état, when all political parties were banned following a self coup by Prime Minister Kārlis Ulmanis.

== Ideology ==
The party represented conservative parts of the commercial, professional and industrial sectors. It supported a nationalist foreign policy and paying compensation to the 1,300 landowners who had been dispossessed during the 1920 land reforms in order to redistribute 3.7 million hectares. Its 1931 electoral campaign was described by the Jewish Telegraphic Agency daily news bulletin as entirely directed against Jews.

It usually sat in the Saeima alongside the Christian National Union, the Party for Peace and Order and some Latgalian parties, in a grouping known as the "National Bloc".

Pērkonkrusts founder Gustavs Celmiņš was a member of the party but left due to dissatisfaction with its lack of radicalism.
