= Agudas Israel (Latvia) =

Jewish political party in Latvia

Agudas Israel אגודת ישראל
- President: Mordehai Dubin
- Dissolved: May 1934
- Ideology: Conservatism; Hasidism

Agudas Israel (Agudat Izrael, Hebrew for "Union of Israel") was a political party in Latvia in the inter-war period. Primarily a party of the Orthodox Jews, it was the most conservative of the Jewish parties in the country, seeking to limit the power of state monopolies. It was led by Mordehai Dubin.

== History ==
The party first contested national elections in 1922, when it won two seats in the 1st Saeima. It retained both seats in the 2nd Saeima after the 1925 elections, but was reduced to one seat in the 1928 elections. The 1931 elections saw the party win two seats in the 4th Saeima. However, after the 1934 Latvian coup d'état multi-party elections were not held again until 1990.

After the coup, the party continued its existence as a NGO until the Soviet occupation of Latvia in 1940, issuing the Yiddish-language newspaper Haint ('Today'), contrary to other former Jewish parties. This was attributed to the positive personal relationship between Dubin and Kārlis Ulmanis, the leader of the coup. When the Soviet occupation began, members of Agudas Israel and Mizrahi were reluctant to support the occupiers.

== See also ==
- History of the Jews in Latvia
- Ceire Cion
- Jewish National Bloc
