= Committee of the German Baltic Parties =

Alliance of Baltic German political parties in Latvia

The Committee of the German-Baltic Parties (German: Ausschuß der Deutschbaltischen Parteien, ADP) was an alliance of Baltic German political parties in Latvia during the inter-war period. Its members included the German-Baltic Democratic Party, the German-Baltic Progressive Party, the German-Baltic Reform Party, the German-Baltic People's Party, the German-Baltic Integration Party, the German-Baltic State Party and the Voters Association of Mitau.

== History ==
The alliance was established in early 1920 as a successor to the National Committee. It won six seats in the 1920 Constitutional Assembly elections. The alliance retained its six seats in the 1st Saeima in the 1922 elections, but was reduced to four seats in the 1925 elections. The alliance returned to its six-seat strength in the 3rd Saeima as a result of the 1928 elections. Following the 1931 elections (the last multi-party elections in Latvia until 1990), they had five seats in the 4th Saeima.

== Members of the Saeima ==
Body	Years	Member	Party	Notes
Constitutional Assembly	1920–1922	Wilhelm von Fircks	German-Baltic People's Party	
Constitutional Assembly	1920–1922	Peter Kluge	German-Baltic Progressive Party	
Constitutional Assembly	1920–1922	Egon Knopp	German-Baltic Integration Party	
Constitutional Assembly	1920–1922	Edwin Magnus	German-Baltic Reform Party	
Constitutional Assembly	1920–1922	Arthur Reusner	German-Baltic People's Party	
Constitutional Assembly	1920–1922	Paul Schiemann	German-Baltic Democratic Party	Alliance leader
First Saiema	1922–1925	Wilhelm von Fircks	German-Baltic People's Party	
First Saiema	1922–1925	John Karl Hahn	German-Baltic Integration Party	
First Saiema	1922–1925	Karl Kenner	German-Baltic Democratic Party	
First Saiema	1922–1925	Egon Knopp	German-Baltic Integration Party	
First Saiema	1922–1925	Paul Schiemann	German-Baltic Democratic Party	Leader
First Saiema	1922–1925	Manfred von Vegesack	German-Baltic Reform Party	
Second Saeima	1925–1928	Alfred Alsleben	International Homeowners	
Second Saeima	1925–1928	Wilhelm von Fircks	German-Baltic People's Party	
Second Saeima	1925–1928	John Karl Hahn	German-Baltic Integration Party	
Second Saeima	1925–1928	Karl Keller	German-Baltic Democratic Party	
Second Saeima	1925–1928	Paul Schiemann	German-Baltic Democratic Party	Leader
Third Saeima	1928–1931	Wilhelm von Fircks	German-Baltic People's Party	Alliance leader from 10 March 1931
Third Saeima	1928–1931	John Karl Hahn	German-Baltic Integration Party	
Third Saeima	1928–1931	Woldemar Pussoll	German-Baltic People's Party	
Third Saeima	1928–1931	Paul Schiemann	German-Baltic Democratic Party	Leader until 10 March 1931, when he gave up his seat
Third Saeima	1928–1931	Lothar Schoeler	German-Baltic Reform Party	
Third Saeima	1928–1931	Walter Sadowski	German-Baltic Democratic Party	Replaced Paul Schiemann on 10 March 1931
Third Saeima	1928–1931	Werner Westermann	Voters Association of Mitau	
Fourth Saeima	1931–1934	Wilhelm von Fircks	German-Baltic People's Party	Resigned on 18 October 1933
Fourth Saeima	1931–1934	John Karl Hahn	German-Baltic Integration Party	
Fourth Saeima	1931–1934	Karl Keller	German-Baltic Democratic Party	Replaced Wilhelm von Fircks on 18 October 1933
Fourth Saeima	1931–1934	Woldemar Pussoll	German-Baltic People's Party	
Fourth Saeima	1931–1934	Paul Schiemann	German-Baltic Democratic Party	Leader until 19 October 1933, when he gave up his seat
Fourth Saeima	1931–1934	Lothar Schoeler	German-Baltic Reform Party	Leader from 19 October 1933
Fourth Saeima	1931–1934	Helmuth Stegman	German-Baltic State Party	Replaced Paul Schiemann on 19 October 1933
Fourth Saeima	1931–1934	Werner Westermann	Voters Association of Mitau	
