= Latgalian Farmer-Labour Party =

Political party in inter-war Latvia

The Latgalian Farmer-Labour Party, also known as the Latgalian Progressive Farmers, was a political party in Latvia during the inter-war period. The party contested elections in an alliance with several other parties under the name United List of Latgalian Small Landless Farmers and Latgalian Labour Party. It was led by Jezups Trasuns.

== History ==
The party first contested national elections in 1922, when it won four seats in the parliamentary elections that year. It was reduced to two seats in 2nd Saeima after 1925 elections. The party changed its name to the Progressive People's Union (Latvian: Progresīvā tautas apvienība), which won three seats in the 1928 elections. The 1931 elections saw the party win five seats in the 4th Saeima.

== Ideology ==
The party supported radical land reform, including land distribution without compensation for former landowners. Like other parties in Latgale, it took an anti-Polish stance.
