= Arveds Bergs =

Latvian politician and lawyer

Arveds Kārlis Kristaps Bergs (13 September 1875 Riga, Governorate of Livonia, Russian Empire – 19 December 1941, Chkalov, Chkalov Oblast, Soviet Union) was a Latvian lawyer, newspaper editor and politician actively advocating establishing of an independent Latvian state and later, as the leader of National Union, member of Saeima. Minister of Interior between 9 December 1919 and 19 June 1921, in the Latvian Provisional Government. After the Soviet occupation of Latvia in 1940, Bergs was arrested and deported to a prison camp where he died.

His father, Kristaps Bergs, was a self-made businessman and property developer in Riga. Arveds attended Riga City Gymnasium (1888-1892) and went to study law at Dorpat University (1892-1896) where he joined Lettonia fraternity. After graduation, he went on to work in St. Petersburg. In 1900 returned to Riga, where parallel to his work as a lawyer, Bergs soon began publishing editorials in his father's newspaper Baltijas Vēstnesis (The Baltic Messenger) and became active in Riga Latvian Society and its Latvian Encyclopedia for which he wrote some articles. In 1904 Bergs purchased a printing house.

During the 1905 Russian Revolution Bergs used the short period of liberalization to establish the Latvian Democratic Party together with Augusts Deglavs and Gustavs Zemgals. On 25 July 1907 he was exiled from the Russian Empire proper to the autonomous Grand Duchy of Finland for his political activities. Bergs used this time to absorb nationalist and independence ideas from more advanced Finns and to travel to Germany and Switzerland, where he saw different models of democracy. In Switzerland, he befriended Latvian poet and politician Rainis. In autumn of 1908 Bergs was allowed to return to Riga, where he concentrated on his work as an editor and undertook more travelling to the Middle East and Egypt.

In early summer of 1915 German Imperial Army invaded and quickly occupied Kurzeme and Zemgale. A large part of the inhabitants were ordered by the retreating Russian Imperial Army to leave their homes. Latvian society soon organized Latvian refugee support central committee. After the death of Vilis Olavs in 1917 it was headed by Arveds Bergs. After the February Revolution in Russia this post became increasingly political and Bergs was involved in the establishment of the Provisional Latvian National Council, which strongly advocated political unification of Latvian inhabited lands and proclamation of an independent state.

In 1917 Bergs re-established his Democratic Party and in August 1918 returned from Petrograd to Riga which was soon occupied by Germans. After the proclamation of Latvian independence on 18 November 1918 by Tautas Padome, in December Bergs, as a lawyer, was appointed to head the Chamber of Courts. In early 1919 went to the Paris Peace Conference as a member of Latvian delegation.

He was the Minister of Interior between 1919-1921 in the early governments headed by Kārlis Ulmanis during the Latvian War of Independence. As the leader of his party, Bergs was elected to the Constitutional Assembly of Latvia, 1st Saeima, 2nd Saeima and 3rd Saeima, but no longer took part in governments. During 1921-1934 he published and edited newspaper Latvis (Latvian) which represented center-right, Latvian nationalist opinions of well-off city dwellers. According to the Jewish Daily Bulletin, he was already known as an anti-semite in the 1920s.

After the 15 May 1934 Latvian coup d'état, Bergs supported the new regime in his newspaper. During this time, his newspaper pleaded for stronger discrimination of Jewish population than of other minorities. However, it was soon shut-down and Bergs spent the remaining years until 1940 in a soft internal exile, prevented from publishing or public activities. After Soviet occupation, he was arrested and deported to prison in Chkalov, where he was executed on 19 December 1941.
