= Voldemārs Bastjānis =

Latvian politician (1884–1975)

Ernests Voldemārs Bastjānis (born Ernests Voldemārs Bašēns on August 17, 1884, in Pociems (now Limbaži Municipality), Kreis Wolmar, died on May 19, 1975, in Boston, Massachusetts) was a Social Democratic Latvian politician and member of the Saeima from 1922 until the 1934 Ulmanis coup. He also served as Minister of Finance of the Republic of Latvia from 1926 to 1927.

He wrote three books covering that period of Latvian history: Gala Sakums (Memento, Sweden 1964); Demokratiska Latvija (Ogrins, Stockholm 1966); and Dzives Straume, Atminas (Ogrins, Stockholm 1970).
