= Democratic Centre (Latvia) =

Latvian political party

Democratic Centre and Non-Partisan Public Workers Demokrātiskais centrs un bezpartejiskie sabiedriskie darbinieki
- Leader: Gustavs Zemgals; Pēteris Juraševskis
- Founded: January 1923
- Dissolved: 15 May 1934
- Merger of: Workers' Party; Latvian People's Party
- Headquarters: Riga
- Ideology: Centrism; Liberalism; Agrarianism
- Political position: Centre

The Democratic Centre (Latvian: Demokrātiskais Centrs), officially the Democratic Centre and Non-Partisan Public Workers (Demokrātiskais centrs un bezpartejiskie sabiedriskie darbinieki), was a political party in Latvia in the inter-war period.

== History ==
The Democratic Centre was initially established as an alliance of the Workers' Party and the Latvian People's Party prior to the 1922 elections, in which it won six seats, becoming the fourth-largest faction in the first Saeima. In January 1923, the two parties officially merged into the Democratic Centre.

The party won five seats in the 1925 elections, becoming the third-largest faction in the 2nd Saeima and entering the coalition formed by party member Pēteris Juraševskis. The 1928 elections saw the party reduced to three seats, although it recovered to win six seats in the 1931 elections, which included the election of Berta Pīpiņa, the first woman elected to serve in the Saeima. In addition, the two first Presidents of Latvia – Jānis Čakste and Gustavs Zemgals – were party members.

The party was dissolved after the 15 May 1934 Latvian coup d'état. It was unofficially refounded underground during the German occupation of Latvia during World War II, and its members were among the main activists of the Latvian Central Council resistance organisation, together with the LSDSP.

After the restoration of Latvian independence, the Democratic Center Party of Latvia was founded in the early 1990s and claimed to be the party's ideological successor.

== See also ==
- Selection of party posters from the Latvian State Historical Archive, a part of the National Archives of Latvia.
