= Andrejs Veckalns =

Latvian politician (1879–1942)

Andrejs Veckalns (April 18, 1879 - May 18, 1942) was a Latvian politician, member of the Latvian Social Democratic Workers' Party, and member of the 1st, 2nd, 3rd, and 4th Saeima (Latvian parliament), representing Social Democrats, and Chairman of the Central Office of Latvian Trade Unions.

Knight of the Order of Lāčplēsis, awarded in 1927 for battles near Daugava in 1919.

After the first Soviet occupation of Latvia, in 1941 he together with his family was deported to Siberia and in 1942 he was executed in Usollag Gulag labor camp near Solikamsk.
