= Party of the Orthodox =

Inter-war Latvian political party

The Party of the Orthodox or the Bloc of Orthodox Voters and Russian United Organizations (Latvian: Pareizticīgo vēlētāju un krievu apvienoto organizāciju bloks) was a political party in Latvia during the inter-war period. Primarily representing Russian Orthodox peasants in Latgale, it was led by Archbishop Jānis Pommers.

== History ==
The party won two seats in the 1925 parliamentary elections, retaining both in the 1928 parliamentary elections. It was reduced to a single seat in the 1931 parliamentary elections. As all parties, it was dissolved after the 1934 coup.

== Ideology ==
The party's ideology was focused on the 1920 land reforms and attempts to revise them in favour of their supporters.
