= Union of Social Democrats – Mensheviks and Rural Workers =

Latvian political party

The Union of Social Democrats – Mensheviks and Rural Workers (Latvian: Sociāldemokrātu mazinieku un laukstrādnieku savenība, SDML) was a political party in Latvia in the inter-war period led by Marģers Skujenieks.

== History ==
The party was established in July 1921 as a breakaway faction from the Latvian Social Democratic Workers' Party. They won seven seats in the 1922 elections, becoming the third-largest faction in the 1st Saeima. In the 1925 elections they were reduced to four seats, with the party going on to win just two seats in the 1928 elections. The party was dissolved in 1929, with its leadership going on to establish the Progressive Association.
