= Noah Meisel =

Belarusian-born Latvian Jewish politician and Bundist

Noah Meisel (Latvian: Noijs Maizels; 1891–1956) was a Jewish Bundist politician and doctor in Latvia. He was born in Nesvizh in the Minsk Governorate of the Russian Empire (now Belarus). He worked in the Latvian Ministry of Health. Meisel, also a Daugavpils city council member, was elected for the Bund in the three first Latvian Parliament in 1922, 1925 and 1928, but was not reelected in 1931. After the coup d'état on May 15, 1934, he was imprisoned in the Liepāja concentration camp.

Bund election poster from Latvia, inviting to a meeting with member of Saeima (Parliament) Dr. Noah Maizel

Meisel was arrested and deported by the Soviet authorities after the Soviet occupation of Latvia in 1940. He died in Northern Russia in 1956.
