= Mordehai Dubin =

Jewish spiritual and political leader in Latvia

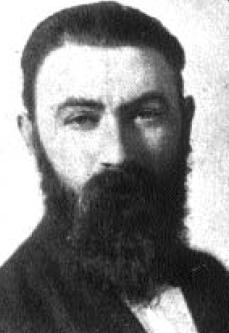

Deputy of the Saeima

Personal details
- Born: 1 January 1889 Riga
- Died: 1956 (aged 66–67) Tula
- Party: Agudas Israel

Mordehai Dubin (Latvian: Mordehajs Dubins; January 1, 1889, Riga, Governorate of Livonia, Russian Empire – 1956, Tula, USSR) was a major Jewish spiritual and political leader in Latvia. He served as a Member of Parliament (Saeima) for the Agudas Israel party. He headed the Jewish community in Latvia until 1940, when it was annexed by the USSR.

Due to his efforts, the imprisonment of the famous "Lubavitcher" Rebbe Yosef Yitzchok Schneersohn in the USSR in 1927 was commuted to exile in Latvia.

Dubin was a personal friend of Kārlis Ulmanis, the nationalist authoritarian dictator of Latvia from 1934–1940.

Dubin was deported from Latvia by the Soviet authorities in 1940 and released in 1942. After World War II he returned to Riga where the local press attacked him violently, of course under orders from above. He was arrested again and deported in 1948. He lived under arrest and exile in Siberia, first in Samara, and later in Tula, where he died in 1956 in a labor camp and is buried.

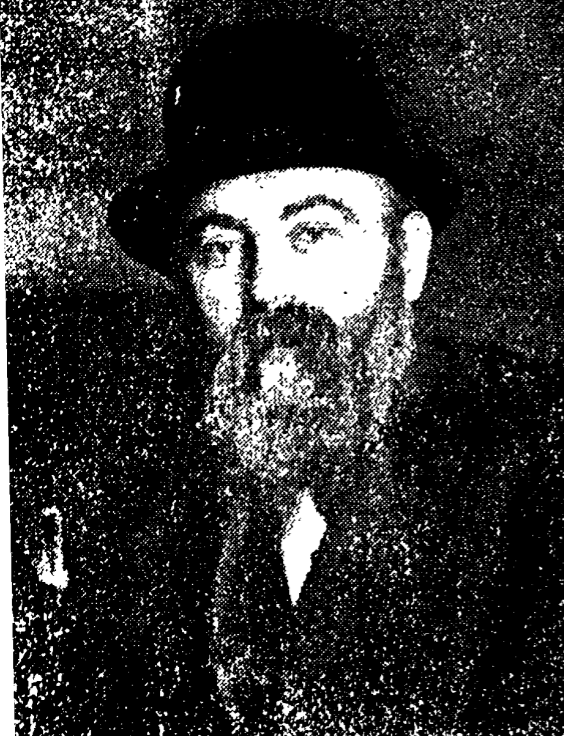
Rabbi Mordechai Dubin
