= Pauls Kalniņš =

Latvian politician (1872–1945)

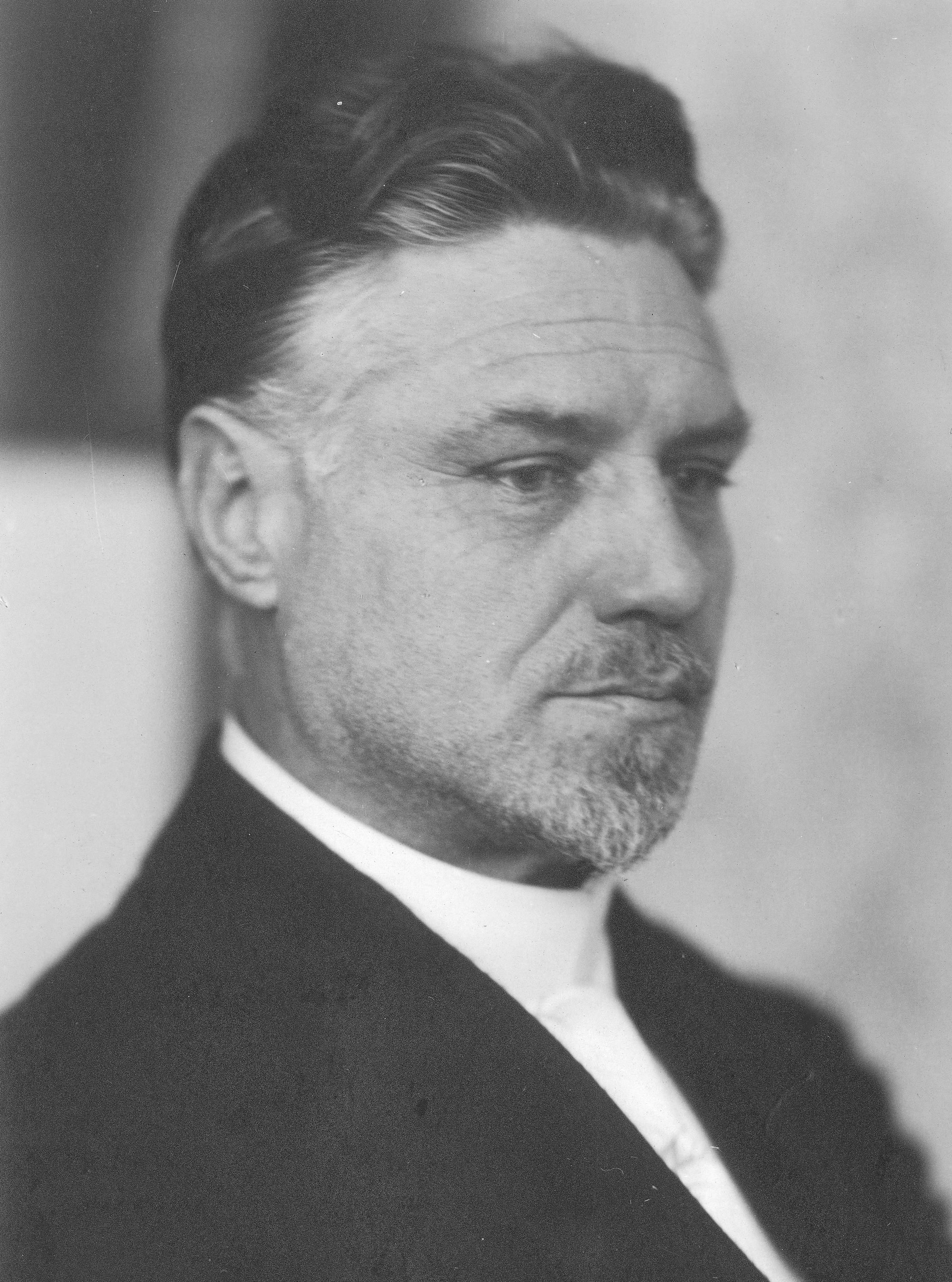

Speaker of the Saeima
- In office 20 March 1925 – 15 May 1934
- President: Jānis Čakste; Gustavs Zemgals; Alberts Kviesis
- Prime Minister: Hugo Celmiņš; Kārlis Ulmanis; Arturs Alberings; Marģers Skujenieks; Pēteris Juraševskis; Hugo Celmiņš (2nd term); Kārlis Ulmanis (3nd term); Marģers Skujenieks (2nd term); Ādolfs Bļodnieks
- Deputy: Kārlis Pauluks; Jāzeps Rancāns; Juris Pabērzs; Alberts Kviesis; Arturs Alberings; Margers Skujenieks
- Preceded by: Frīdrihs Vesmanis
- Succeeded by: Position abolished

Acting President of Latvia
- In office 14 March 1927 – 8 April 1927
- Prime Minister: Marģers Skujenieks
- Preceded by: Jānis Čakste
- Succeeded by: Gustavs Zemgals

Personal details
- Born: 3 March 1872 Vilce Parish, Dobele district, Courland Governorate, Russian Empire
- Died: 26 August 1945 (aged 73) Bezau, French-occupied Austria (now Vorarlberg, Austria)
- Party: LSDSP
- Spouse: Klāra Kalniņa
- Children: Brūno Kalniņš
- Education: University of Tartu
- Profession: Doctor
- Awards: Order of the Three Stars, 1st and 2nd Class

Pauls Kalniņš (3 March 1872 – 26 August 1945) was a Latvian physician and politician (LSDSP), a long-term Speaker of the Saeima, one of the signatories of the Memorandum of the Latvian Central Council on 17 March 1944, and was the Acting President of Latvia (1927, 1944–1945).

== Personal life ==
Pauls Kalniņš was born on 3 March 1872 (from other sources – 3 April) at the Vilce Parish "Mazpečuļos" as a farmer's son. After graduating from the local parish school, he studied at Liepāja Gymnasium, where he met such later statesmen such as Miķelis Valters and Jānis Jansons-Brauns. He graduated from the gymnasium in 1892 and went to study natural sciences at Moscow University, but later moved to the University of Tartu, where he studied medicine, obtaining a medical degree as a Doctor of Medicine in 1898. He met his wife, Klāra Kalniņa, in 1896

and married her three years after.

== Political career ==
As a member of Pīpkalonija, in 1897, he was arrested together with other members of the New Current and deported from Latvia until 1901. The deportation was accompanied by Žagarė. After returning to Latvia, he became a prominent member of the Social Democrats, a participant in the 1905 Russian Revolution, and was a collaborator in the editorial staff of Cīņa (now Neatkarīgā Rīta Avīze). He joined the non-Bolshevik direction of social democracy. He became a Chairman of the LSDSP Central Committee (1918–1924), a member of the People's Council, a member of the Constitutional Assembly and a member of all the first free state Saeima, as a Chairman of the 1st, 2nd, 3rd and 4th Saeima.

Kalniņš ran in the Latvian presidential elections of 1930 and 1933. On both occasions, he lost to Alberts Kviesis. Kalniņš received the Order of the Three Stars 1st (1927) and 2nd Class (1926).

After the coup of K. Ulmanis, Kalniņš spent 4 months in the concentration camp of Liepāja.

During World War II and the occupation of the Baltic states, Kalniņš was one of the founders of the Latvian Central Council, the main political resistance movement, becoming its leader after the arrest of Konstantīns Čakste by the Gestapo.

In a meeting of the LCC on 8 September 1944, Kalniņš signed the Declaration on the Restoration of the Latvian State: "On the basis of the Satversme of the Republic of Latvia (Article 52), the position of the last President of the Saeima has passed to me as the last legally elected Speaker of the Saeima. On this day, I took up the position of the President until the election of a new President in accordance with the procedure provided for in the Satversme. [..] "

According to the Constitution of Latvia, as the last Speaker of the Saeima, he was the acting president until his death.

== Death ==
In 1944 Kalniņš emigrated. He died on 26 August 1945 in the village of Bezau near Lustenau, in the Allied occupied Austria.

He was survived by his wife Klāra Kalniņa and son Brūno Kalniņš, who were also notable employees of the Social Democrats.
