= Max Lazerson =

Latvian politician, journalist and lawyer

- מתתיהו לזרסון
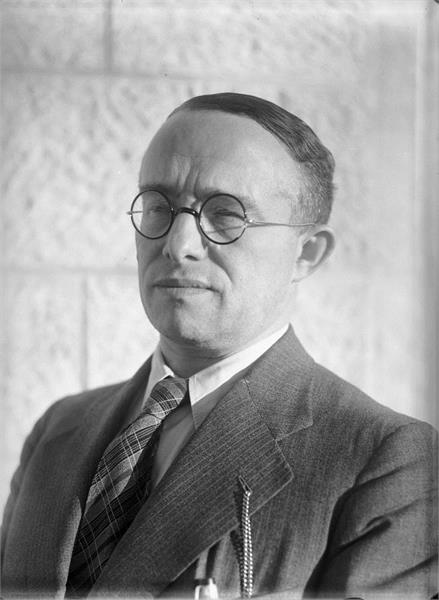
- Professor Lazerson, April 1936
- Born: Max Matatyahu Laserson; February 1, 1887; Jelgava, Russian Empire (present day Latvia)
- Died: November 29, 1951 (aged 64); New York City, New York, USA
- Other names: Max Laserson, Max M. Laserson, Maksis Lazersons, Larsons, M. Ya. (pseudonym)
- Occupations: Politician, jurist, philosopher
- Years active: 1917-1940s

Maksis "Max" Lazerson (Latvian: Maksis Lazersons; 1 February 1887 in Jelgava, Russian Empire (present day Latvia) – 29 November 1951 in New York City, New York, USA) was a Latvian politician, jurist and philosopher. He was a member of Saeima from 1922 to 1925 and again in 1928 to 1931. He led the Ceire Cion party during the interwar period in Latvia.

== Biography ==
Lazerson was born in Jelgava, present day Latvia in a Jewish merchant family of Jacob Zusman Lazerson. Lazerson had 7 siblings. In 1905, he joined the socialist movement and finished Realschule of Jelgava.

From 1906 to 1910, he studied at the Faculty of Law in the University of Saint Petersburg and graduated with honors. In 1916 he was appointed a lecturer at this university. In 1917, after February revolution, he joined the Ministry of Internal Affairs of the Provisional Government. In 1920 he left the Soviet Union and returned to Latvia, where he became involved with the Ceire Cion party. He taught at the School of Economics and the Russian university in Riga.

In 1922 to 1925 and from 1928 to 1931 he was a delegate in Saeima of the Republic of Latvia (Latvian Parliament), where he worked together with the left-wing parties, and to protect the rights of minorities in general and Jews in particular. Among other things, he struggled, without success, to force compulsory rest on Sundays. He also succeeded in allowing Jewish schools to teach in Hebrew, contrary to the position of the Bund, which required them to teach only in Yiddish. Lazerson was also active in the association of Hapoel Hatzair and Tzeirei Zion and was its deputy on the Zionist General Council. In the November 1931 election, Larsson lacked a few votes to be re-elected and dropped out.

In March 1934, Lazerson visited Mandatory Palestine to attend a meeting of the Zionist General Council. Following the Latvian coup d'état of Ulmanis on May 15, 1934, Lazerson was banned as a leftist, at the same time as abolishing cultural autonomy for Jews. In November 1934, Larsson was released from custody, having admitted to leave Latvia. After his release he immigrated to Mandatory Palestine, where he arrived in January 1935. In 1935 he was one of the founders of the Higher School of Law and Economics in Tel Aviv, where he gave lectures in general jurisprudence and economics.

Later, he stayed in the US, worked in Justice Department, and then went on to serve as a professor of public international law at Columbia University.

Lazerson died on 29 November 1951, aged 64 in New York

== Bibliography ==
- Laserson, Max M (1950). The American impact on Russia: diplomatic and ideological, 1784-1917. New York: Macmillan Company. OCLC 35720365.
- Laserson, Max M (1945). Russia and the western world; the place of the Soviet union in the comity of nations,. New York: Macmillan Co. OCLC 491858.
- Laserson, Max M (1943). The development of Soviet foreign policy in Europe,. New York: Carnegie Endowment for International Peace, Division of Intercourse and Education. OCLC 1361944.
- Laserson, Max M (1937). On the Mandate; documents, statements, laws and judgments relating to and arising from the Mandate for Palestine. Tel-Aviv: "Igereth". OCLC 933974.
- Laserson, Max M (1933). Die russische Rechtsphilosophie (in German). Berlin-Grunewald: W. Rothschild. OCLC 16693454.
- Laserson, Max M (1927). Staat, Souveränität und Minorität (in German). Riga: B. Lamey. OCLC 6653092.
