= Marģers Skujenieks =

Prime Minister of Latvia (1886–1941)

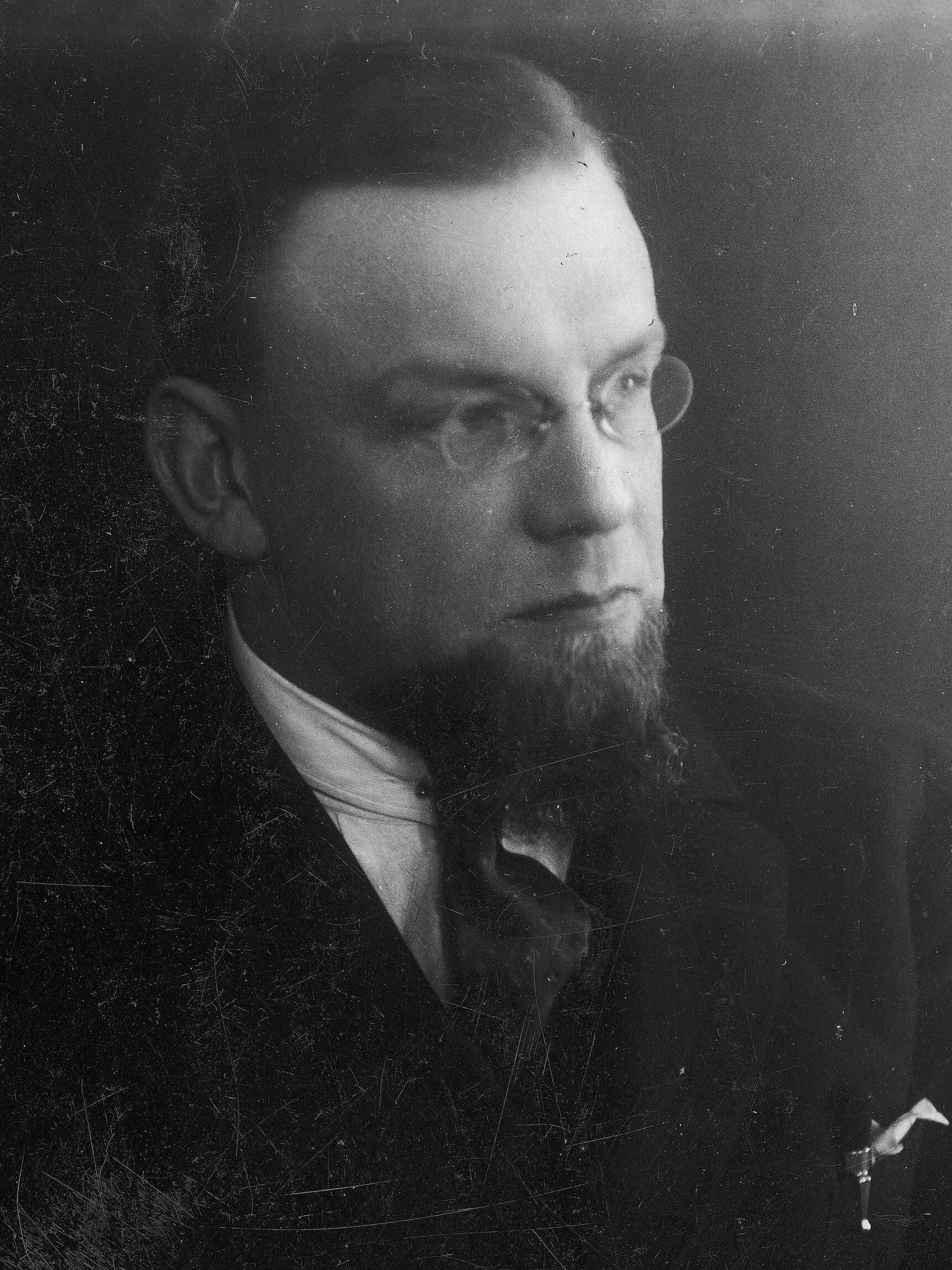

7th Prime Minister of Latvia
- In office 19 December 1926 – 23 January 1928
- President: Jānis Čakste; Gustavs Zemgals
- Preceded by: Arturs Alberings
- Succeeded by: Pēteris Juraševskis
- In office 6 December 1931 – 23 March 1933
- President: Alberts Kviesis
- Preceded by: Kārlis Ulmanis
- Succeeded by: Ādolfs Bļodnieks

Latvian Minister of Finance
- In office 21 February 1932 – 23 March 1933
- Prime Minister: Himself
- Preceded by: Gustavs Zemgals
- Succeeded by: Jānis Annuss

Personal details
- Born: 22 June 1886 Rīga, Latvia (part of the Russian Empire)
- Died: 12 July 1941 (aged 55) Moscow, Soviet Union
- Party: Union of Social Democrats – Mensheviks and Rural Workers
- Other political affiliations: Progressive Union (Latvia), Latvian Social Democratic Workers' Party
- Profession: Politician, Statistician

Marģers Skujenieks (22 June 1886 – 12 July 1941) held the office of Prime Minister of Latvia twice from 19 December 1926 – 23 January 1928 and 6 December 1931 – 23 March 1933.

== Early life ==
Skujenieks was born in Riga, into the family of Vensku Edvarts (real name Eduards Skujenieks), a notable publicist and a poet, and Luīze Skujeniece (daughter of Juris Alunāns), the first female Latvian theatre critic. His sister was actress and poet Biruta Skujeniece. After studies in Jelgava and Rīga he studied economics at the Moscow Commerce institute.

Skujenieks became a Social Democrat in 1903, but he never supported the concept of international class struggle, where nationality would be of no importance. Instead, he was one of the early proponents of Latvian national unity. After the suppression of the 1905 Russian Revolution he was forced to emigrate to London in 1906, but in 1907 was allowed to return to the Russian Empire and went on to study economics at the Moscow Commercial Institute. In 1911 he proposed political autonomy for the Baltic provinces and had to flee in exile once again. In 1913 in St. Petersburg he published the book Nacionālais jautājums Latvijā (The National Question in Latvia) in defense of Latvian national rights. By 1914 he had become an opponent of the Bolsheviks led by Lenin. During World War I he worked in the Latvian War Refugee Aid Committee and in 1917 was elected to the Council of Landless Peasants of Vidzeme.

== Latvian politics ==
Skujenieks' political career began as one of the leading Social Democratic members of the Democratic Bloc, and as such he was included in the Tautas padome and co-chaired the meeting which declared the independence of Latvia on 18 November 1918. In 1919 he went to the Paris Peace Conference to lobby for the international recognition of Latvia.

From 1919 until 1940 he led the State Statistics Department, leaving this post only for the duration of ministerial or prime ministerial duties. In April 1920 he was elected to the Constitutional Assembly of Latvia, where he participated in creating the Constitution of Latvia. In 1921 Skujenieks and a group of MPs broke away from the mainstream Social Democrats and established his own faction, which then joined the ruling coalition. In 1922 he was elected to the 1st Saeima. He was an MP until the 1934 Latvian coup d'état as the leader of Union of Social Democrats – Mensheviks and Rural Workers, and eventually moved ideologically more to the right as the leader of the Progressive Union.

On 19 December 1926 he succeeded the Prime Minister Arturs Alberings as the first Social Democratic prime minister and remained in the post until 23 January 1928, also filling the post of Minister of Interior from 19 December 1926 until 23 January 1928. On 5 February 1927 a customs union agreement with Estonia was signed. During his tenure, a 5-year trade agreement with the Soviet Union was signed on 2 June 1927. This created domestic political controversy which eventually led to Skujenieks' cabinet resignation.

After the elections of October 1931, he succeeded Kārlis Ulmanis on 6 December 1931 as the Prime Minister. Skujenieks led a coalition government which held office until 23 March 1933. Due to instability of his coalition, Skujenieks also held the post of Minister of Finance (21 February 1932 - 23 March 1933) and Interior Minister (6 December 1931 - 20 March 1932). On 5 February 1932, a non-aggression treaty with the Soviet Union was signed.

This was the time of the Great Depression, when parliamentary democracy was losing support in much of Europe. Skujenieks, by this time more nationalistic and critical of the Saeima, allegedly was involved in a coup plot by Social Democrat Fēlikss Cielēns, his good friend, general Jānis Balodis and some leading officers, who intended to stage a coup and then give the power to Skujenieks. Between 1931 and 1934 his party published the newspaper Latviešu balss (The Voice of Latvians).

== Later life ==
After the 15 May 1934 Latvian coup d'état by Prime Minister Kārlis Ulmanis, Skujenieks served in the mostly ceremonial post of Deputy Prime Minister until 16 June 1938. He was also Chairman of the Sports Association as well as President of the Latvian Olympic Committee. He also headed the National Building Commission, which planned the monumental buildings of the new regime. Skujenieks resigned from the government after Ulmanis did not fulfill his promises of constitutional reform and instead continued to strengthen a paternalistic authoritarian regime. For the last few years of independence he continued to head the State Statistics Department.

After the Soviet occupation of Latvia in 1940, he was arrested in July or August 1940, sent to Moscow for interrogations and there he was executed by shooting on 12 July 1941.

== Awards ==
- (Latvia) Order of the Three Stars, 1st Class (1937) and 2nd Class (1928)
- (Latvia) Aizsargi Cross of Merit (1927)
- (Estonia) Order of the Cross of the Eagle, 1st Class
- (Latvia) Medal "For Merit in Firefighting", 1st Class (1927)

Political offices
Preceded by Arturs Alberings	Prime Minister of Latvia; 19 December 1926 – 23 January 1928	Succeeded by Pēteris Juraševskis
Preceded by Kārlis Ulmanis	Prime Minister of Latvia; 6 December 1931 – 23 March 1933	Succeeded by Ādolfs Bļodnieks
