= Zionist Organization Mizrachi =

Political party in interwar Latvia

Zionist Organization Mizrachi Cionistu organizācija "Mizrahi"
- Founder: Mordechai Nurock
- Founded: 1921
- Dissolved: 1934
- Headquarters: Riga
- Ideology: Zionism; Religious nationalism
- Political position: Centre-right

The Zionist Organization Mizrachi (Latvian: Cionistu organizācija "Mizrahi") was a political party in the interbellum Latvia during 1921–1934. It won some seats in Latvian parliamentary elections in 1922, 1925, 1928, and 1931.

The party was disbanded in 1934, after the Ulmanis authoritarian coup d'état, together with all other political parties. Its activists, like those of Agudas Israel, were critical and reluctant towards the Soviet occupiers after the Soviet occupation of Latvia in 1940.

== See also ==
- Mizrachi, for the meaning of the name of the party
- Agudas Israel
- Ceire Cion
- Jewish National Bloc
