= Ceire Cion =

Former Jewish Latvian political party

- President: Max Lazerson
- Dissolved: 1931
- Ideology: Labor Zionism
- Political position: Centre-left

Ceire Cion (Hebrew: צעירי ציון, "Youth of Zion"), sometimes called the Zionist Party or Ethnic Socialist Party, was a centre-left Jewish political party in Latvia during the inter-war period. It was led by jurist Max Lazerson. The party combined the ideas of Zionism and democratic socialism. One of the party's goals was to create a Jewish state in Palestine.

== History ==
The party won a single seat in the 1920 Constitutional Assembly elections. It retained its seat in the 1922, 1925 and 1928 elections, but missed out on a seat in the 1931 elections by 50 votes. Later in 1931 it merged with the Latvian Organisation of Zionist Socialists to form the Zionist-Socialist Party. The new party continued some activities until the 1934 Latvian coup d'état and the ban on all parties. Some of its members served short terms in 1934 at the makeshift Liepāja Concentration Camp.

== See also ==
- Tze'irei Zion
- History of the Jews in Latvia
