= Latvian Social Democratic Workers' Party =

Latvian political party

Latvian Social Democratic Workers' Party Latvijas Sociāldemokrātiskā Strādnieku Partija
- Abbreviation: LSDSP
- Leader: Jānis Dinevičs
- Founder: Pauls Kalniņš (1918); Valdis Šteins (1989)
- Founded: 17 June 1918; 108 years ago 2 December 1989; 36 years ago (refoundation)
- Banned: 15 May 1934; 92 years ago
- Split from: Social-Democracy of the Latvian Territory
- Headquarters: Riga, Lāčplēša iela 60, LV-1011
- Youth wing: Social Democratic Youth Union
- Membership (2017): 633
- Ideology: Social democracy
- Political position: Left-wing
- National affiliation: Union of Greens and Farmers
- European affiliation: Party of European Socialists (observer)
- International affiliation: Socialist International (1994–2014)
- Colours: Maroon; Green
- Slogan: Give a hand, together we will succeed! (Latvian: Sniedz roku, kopā mums izdosies!)
- Saeima: 0 / 100
- European Parliament: 0 / 8

Website
- www.lsdsp.lv

The Latvian Social Democratic Workers' Party (Latvian: Latvijas Sociāldemokrātiskā strādnieku partija, LSDSP) is a social democratic political party in Latvia and the second oldest existing Latvian political party after the Latvian Farmers' Union. It is currently represented with two seats in the parliament of Latvia as a part of the Union of Greens and Farmers alliance after an absence of 20 years. The party tends to hold a less Russophilic view than the Social Democratic Party "Harmony".

== History ==
=== Founding, interwar Latvia, under authoritarianism and occupation ===
The Latvian Social Democratic Workers' Party was founded on 17 June 1918, by Menshevik elements who had been expelled from the Social Democracy of the Latvian Territory in 1915. Once Latvia became independent, LSDSP was one of the two most influential political parties (along with the Latvian Farmers' Union). LSDSP held 57 out of 150 seats in the 1920 Constitutional Assembly (Satversmes Sapulce). It won the most seats in each of four parliamentary elections of that period (31 out of 100 in 1922, 33 in 1925, 26 in 1928 and 21 in 1931). The leader of the LSDSP, Pauls Kalniņš, was speaker of the Latvian parliament from 1925 to 1934.

The party itself, however, would often be in opposition because of many smaller right-wing parties forming coalition governments, typically led by the Latvian Farmers' Union.

The party was a member of the Labour and Socialist International between 1923 and 1940, and was admitted into the modern Socialist International in 1994.

The LSDSP was banned after the 1934 coup by Kārlis Ulmanis, together with all other political parties. Around 320 prominent members were briefly interned in the Liepāja Concentration Camp and then released. After the coup, the party loosely merged with the Latvian Communist Party from 1937 to 1940 as the Socialist Workers and Peasants Party of Latvia and went underground, only to re-emerge briefly after the Soviet occupation of 1940, nearly instantly being banned and driven underground by the Soviet and, later, Nazi occupiers. Some Social Democrats briefly collaborated with the Soviets (e.g. Ansis Rudevics), however, many, including leaders Fricis Menders and Brūno Kalniņš, joined with other democratic politicians and called for the restoration of democratic Latvian statehood. LSDSP members, like Pauls Kalniņš and others, were involved with the Latvian Central Council resistance group. When many Latvians left Latvia during World War II, the LSDSP was restored as an "exile organization", operating in Sweden since 1945, and later in other Western countries.

The Swedish-based section - the LSDSP Foreign Committee (LSDSP ĀK) - managed to secure its observer status at the Socialist International during its existence.

=== Return to Latvia, activities 1990–2010 ===
When Latvia became independent again in 1991, the LSDSP returned to Latvia. In the early 1990s, it struggled with internal splits. At one point, Latvia had three social democratic parties, two of them being descendants of the LSDSP, and the third being the reformed faction of the former Communist Party of Latvia (LSDP). Eventually, all three parties merged, under the name of the LSDSP.

The merged party enjoyed some success in the parliamentary election of 1998, winning 14 seats out of 100; and in local elections in 2001, when one of its members, Gundars Bojārs, became the mayor of Riga. It was less successful in the next legislative election, held on 5 October 2002, where it got only 4% of the vote, and did not make the 5% minimum to get seats. The decline of the LSDSP's popularity continued as the party lost the mayor's seat in Riga in the 2005 municipal election (keeping 7 seats in the Riga City Council but forced into the opposition). The parliamentary election of 2006 brought even more dissatisfying results for the LSDSP, as the party got 3.5% of votes and thus got no representation in the parliament once again.

=== 2010–present ===
For the 2010 parliamentary election, the LSDSP formed the Responsibility Alliance with smaller parties, but their performance was poor, receiving less than 1% of the vote. In January 2011, Aivars Timofejevs, who was supported by the outgoing leader Jānis Dinevičs, was elected as party chairman. He defeated Ansis Dobelis, who was more aligned with youth activist circles and later formed The Progressives. His tenure did not improve the party's performance, with the LSDSP not running in the 2014 parliamentary election. By 2017, Dinēvičs had returned to lead the party. At the 2018 election, the party received just 0,21% of the vote.

2022 brought a historic turn for the party, when on June 1 it joined the Union of Greens and Farmers (ZZS) after the Latvian Green Party had left the alliance, as the second member of ZZS is the Farmer's Union, LSDSP's main rival in the 1920s and 1930s. In the 2022 elections, the party managed to get two of its members elected on the ZZS list, marking a return to the Saeima after an absence of 20 years. In 2023, the party joined rulling coalition (as part of ZSS) for the first since 2011, when Atis Lejiņš left the party.

In 2012, the Socialist International demoted LSDSP to observer member for not paying membership fees. The party was officially delisted from the Socialist International in December 2014. It currently maintains the status of observer member in the Party of European Socialists.

== Election results ==
=== Legislative elections ===
Election	Party leader	Performance					Rank	Government
Election	Party leader	Votes	%	± pp	Seats	+/–	Rank	Government
1920	Andrejs Petrevics	274,877	38.67	New	57 / 150	New	1st	Opposition
1922	Jānis Pliekšāns	241,947	30.56	▼8.11	30 / 100	▼27	1st	Coalition
1925	Pauls Kalniņš	260,987	31.37	▲0.81	32 / 100	▲2	1st	Opposition
1928	Pauls Kalniņš	226,340	24.34	▼7.03	25 / 100	▼7	1st	Opposition
1931	Pauls Kalniņš	186,000	19.23	▼5.11	21 / 100	▼4	1st	Opposition
Banned 1934-1990 under the Ulmanis regime and the Latvian SSR
1993	Egils Baldzēns	7,416	0.66	New	0 / 100	New	17th	Extra-parliamentary
1995 (Note: Labour and Justice (DuT) list, coalition between LSDSP, LSDP and Taisnība)	Jānis Dinevičs	43,599	4.58	▲3.92	0 / 100	0	▲10th	Extra-parliamentary
1998 (Note: Latvian Social Democratic Alliance (LSDA) list, coalition between LSDSP, LSDP and LDP)	Jānis Ādamsons	123,056	12.88 (#5)	▲8.30	14 / 100	▲14	▲5th	Coalition
2002	Juris Bojārs	39,837	4.02	▼8.86	0 / 100	▼14	▼8th	Extra-parliamentary
2006	Jānis Dinevičs	31,728	3.52	▼0.50	0 / 100	0	8th	Extra-parliamentary
2010 (Note: Responsibility list, coalition between LSDSP, Our Land, and Latvijas Atmoda and STP)	Jānis Dinevičs	6,139	0.65	▼2.87	0 / 100	0	▼10th	Extra-parliamentary
2011	Jānis Dinevičs	2,531	0.28	▼0.37	0 / 100	0	▼11th	Extra-parliamentary
2014	Aivars Timofejevs	did not contest						Extra-parliamentary
2018 (Note: SKG Alliance list, coalition between LSDSP, KDS, and GKL)	Jānis Dinevičs	1,735	0.21	▼0.07	0 / 100	0	▼14th	Extra-parliamentary
2022 (Note: Union of Greens and Farmers list, coalition between LZS, LuV and LSDSP)	Jānis Dinevičs	113,676	12.58	▲12.37	2 / 100	▲2	▲2nd	Opposition (2022–2023)
2022	Jānis Dinevičs	113,676	12.58	▲12.37	2 / 100	▲2	▲2nd	Coalition (2023–2026)
2022	Jānis Dinevičs	113,676	12.58	▲12.37	2 / 100	▲2	▲2nd	Coalition (2026)
2026 (Note: ZZS list won 0 seats)	Jānis Dinevičs	35,405	4.46	▼8.12	0 / 100	▼2	▼7th	Extra-parliamentary

=== European Parliament elections ===
Election	List leader	Votes	%	Seats	+/–	EP Group
2004	Unclear	27,468	4.81 (#7)	0 / 9	New	–
2009	Unclear	30,004	3.86 (#9)	0 / 8	0	–
2014	Jānis Dinevičs	1,462	0.33 (#10)	0 / 8	0	–
2019	Jānis Dinevičs	922	0.20 (#14)	0 / 8	0	–
2024 (Note: The ZZS list didn't win any seat)	Harijs Rokpelnis	11,852	2.30 (#9)	0 / 9	0	–

== Symbols and logos ==
Old logo

== See also ==
- Brūno Kalniņš
- Sociāldemokrats, former newspaper
