= Semigallia (Saeima constituency) =

Constituency of the Saeima, the national legislature of Latvia

- Zemgale; Zemgāl; Земгале
- Constituency for the Saeima
- Location of Semigallia within Latvia
- Municipality: List: Jelgava City; Aizkraukle; Bauska; Dobele; Jēkabpils; Jelgava; Tukums
- Region: Semigallia
- Population: 268,918 (2022)
- Electorate: 205,937 (2022)
- Area: 13,189 km^{2} (2023)

Current constituency
- Created: 1922
- Seats: List: 13 (2022–present); 14 (2014–2022); 15 (1995–2014); 16 (1993–1995); 15 (1931–1934); 16 (1928–1931); 15 (1922–1928)
- Deputies: List: Andris Bērziņš (ZZS); Mārtiņš Daģis (JV); Mārtiņš Felss (JV); Arnolds Jātnieks (NA); Līga Kļaviņa (ZZS); Dmitrijs Kovaļenko (S!); Ingmārs Līdaka (AS); Jānis Reirs (JV); Edvīns Šnore (NA); Atis Švinka (PRO); Edgars Tavars (AS); Viktors Valainis (ZZS); Edmunds Zivtiņš (LPV)

Semigallia (Latvian: Zemgale; Livonian: Zemgāl, Russian: Земгале) is one of the five multi-member constituencies of the Saeima, the national legislature of Latvia. The constituency was established in 1922 when the Saeima was established following Latvia's independence. It consists of the city of Jelgava and municipalities of Aizkraukle, Bauska, Dobele, Jēkabpils, Jelgava and Tukums in the region of Semigallia. The constituency currently elects 13 of the 100 members of the Saeima using the open party-list proportional representation electoral system. At the 2022 parliamentary election it had 205,937 registered electors.

== Electoral system ==
Semigallia currently elects 13 of the 100 members of the Saeima using the open party-list proportional representation electoral system. Constituency seats are allocated using the Sainte-Laguë method. Only parties that reach the 5% national threshold compete for constituency seats (4% in 1993).

== Election results ==
=== Summary ===
Election	SKG SKG / LSDSP / ATBILDĪBA / LSDA			Harmony SDPS / SC / TSP / SL			Development/For! AP! / LA			Greens & Farmers ZZS / LZS			New Unity JV / V / JL			Latvia First Latvian Way LPP/LC / LC			Conservatives K / JKP			Russian Union РСЛ / ЗаПЧЕЛ / P			Good Latvia PL / TP			National Alliance NA / TB/LNNK / TB		
Election	Votes	%	Seats	Votes	%	Seats	Votes	%	Seats	Votes	%	Seats	Votes	%	Seats	Votes	%	Seats	Votes	%	Seats	Votes	%	Seats	Votes	%	Seats	Votes	%	Seats
2022				2,916	2.29%	0	6,526	5.12%	0	25,207	19.79%	3	24,177	18.98%	3				4,849	3.81%	0	4,196	3.29%	0				15,682	12.31%	2
2018	261	0.22%	0	11,592	9.99%	2	12,814	11.04%	2	14,660	12.63%	2	9,160	7.89%	1				16,454	14.17%	2	2,273	1.96%	0				16,745	14.42%	2
2014				14,411	11.40%	2	1,410	1.12%	0	35,738	28.27%	4	29,596	23.41%	3				909	0.72%	0	1,912	1.51%	0				24,219	19.16%	3
2011	468	0.36%	0	22,948	17.43%	3				21,083	16.01%	3	26,590	20.19%	3	2,458	1.87%	0				951	0.72%	0				20,660	15.69%	2
2010	936	0.69%	0	20,648	15.16%	2				38,116	27.99%	5	47,789	35.09%	6							1,767	1.30%	0	8,879	6.52%	1	12,455	9.15%	1
2006	4,077	3.14%	0	6,909	5.31%	1				31,443	24.18%	4	22,821	17.55%	3	10,430	8.02%	1				5,192	3.99%	1	29,759	22.89%	4	9,012	6.93%	1
2002	6,646	4.51%	0							17,275	11.72%	2	37,697	25.56%	4	7,731	5.24%	0				13,407	9.09%	2	29,754	20.18%	4	8,333	5.65%	1
1998	23,920	16.69%	3	7,111	4.96%	1				4,691	3.27%	0				25,843	18.03%	3							34,254	23.90%	4	19,759	13.79%	2
1995	7,011	4.87%	0	3,541	2.46%	0				2,249	1.56%	0				19,371	13.47%	3										15,031	10.45%	2
1993				14,109	8.07%	1				25,976	14.86%	3				54,641	31.27%	5				3,322	1.90%	0				7,408	4.24%	1
1931	26,991	18.97%	3							27,275	19.17%	3																		
1928	37,967	27.48%	4							32,917	23.82%	4																		
1925	38,529	30.60%	5							29,755	23.63%	4																		
1922	38,230	31.51%								32,834	27.06%																			

=== Detailed ===
Party has received at least 5% of the vote nationally and is entitled to compete for constituency seats (4% in 1993).

==== 2020s ====
===== 2022 =====
Results of the 2022 parliamentary election held on 1 October 2022:

Party		Votes per municipality							Total votes	%	Seats
Party		Aizkr- aukle	Bauska	Dobele	Jēkab- pils	Jel- gava City	Jel- gava	Tukums	Total votes	%	Seats
Union of Greens and Farmers	ZZS	2,476	4,092	3,169	3,412	4,352	3,156	4,550	25,207	19.79%	3
New Unity	JV	2,762	3,595	2,616	3,134	4,460	2,637	4,973	24,177	18.98%	3
United List	AS	1,684	2,584	1,597	1,971	2,451	1,639	4,092	16,018	12.57%	2
National Alliance	NA	1,761	3,126	1,332	1,952	2,437	1,498	3,576	15,682	12.31%	2
Development/For!	AP	1,461	1,255	585	576	1,118	598	933	6,526	5.12%	0
Latvia First	LPV	717	817	524	1,307	1,244	596	671	5,876	4.61%	1
The Progressives	PRO	590	895	536	633	1,288	582	1,084	5,608	4.40%	1
The Conservatives	K	470	795	853	824	751	473	683	4,849	3.81%	0
Latvian Russian Union	РСЛ	300	198	130	615	2,347	445	161	4,196	3.29%	0
For Each and Every One	KuK	444	613	423	524	879	427	694	4,004	3.14%	0
For Stability!	S!	313	306	222	1,145	1,219	458	234	3,897	3.06%	1
Republic	R	330	447	362	705	481	274	361	2,960	2.32%	0
Social Democratic Party "Harmony"	SDPS	235	279	166	691	930	406	209	2,916	2.29%	0
Sovereign Power	SV	227	246	129	303	519	229	205	1,858	1.46%	0
People's Servants for Latvia	TKL	277	244	167	216	180	166	329	1,579	1.24%	0
Force of People's Power	TVS	142	156	93	236	331	117	132	1,207	0.95%	0
Union for Latvia	AL	42	94	49	44	69	56	61	415	0.33%	0
Progressive Christian Party	KPP	23	34	24	35	45	29	36	226	0.18%	0
United for Latvia	VL	19	31	18	31	34	21	48	202	0.16%	0
Valid votes		14,273	19,807	12,995	18,354	25,135	13,807	23,032	127,403	100.00%	13
Rejected votes		178	212	180	292	260	168	250	1,540	1.19%	
Valid envelopes		14,451	20,019	13,175	18,646	25,395	13,975	23,282	128,943	99.83%	
Rejected envelopes		19	30	17	8	67	15	62	218	0.17%	
Total polled		14,470	20,049	13,192	18,654	25,462	13,990	23,344	129,161	62.72%	
Registered electors		23,397	31,914	21,800	31,112	38,660	23,566	35,488	205,937		
Turnout		61.85%	62.82%	60.51%	59.96%	65.86%	59.37%	65.78%	62.72%		

The following candidates were elected: Andris Bērziņš (ZZS), 26,899 votes; Anda Čakša (JV), 26,799 votes; Mārtiņš Daģis (JV), 24,465 votes; Mārtiņš Felss (JV), 24,648 votes; Līga Kļaviņa (ZZS), 26,527 votes; Dmitrijs Kovaļenko (S!), 4,945 votes; Ingmārs Līdaka (AS), 18,236 votes; Edvīns Šnore (NA), 17,722 votes; Atis Švinka (PRO), 6,351 votes; Edgars Tavars (AS), 17,592 votes; Viktors Valainis (ZZS), 31,487 votes; Jānis Vitenbergs (NA), 18,340 votes; and Edmunds Zivtiņš (LPV), 6,958 votes.

==== 2010s ====
===== 2018 =====
Results of the 2018 parliamentary election held on 6 October 2018:

Party		Votes	%	Seats
Who Owns the State?	KPV LV	21,934	18.89%	3
National Alliance	NA	16,745	14.42%	2
New Conservative Party	JKP	16,454	14.17%	2
Union of Greens and Farmers	ZZS	14,660	12.63%	2
Development/For!	AP	12,814	11.04%	2
Social Democratic Party "Harmony"	SDPS	11,592	9.99%	2
New Unity	JV	9,160	7.89%	1
Latvian Association of Regions	LRA	4,984	4.29%	0
The Progressives	PRO	2,368	2.04%	0
Latvian Russian Union	РСЛ	2,273	1.96%	0
For Latvia from the Heart	NSL	1,161	1.00%	0
Latvian Nationalists	LN	880	0.76%	0
For an Alternative	PA	473	0.41%	0
SKG Alliance	SKG	261	0.22%	0
Action Party	RP	170	0.15%	0
Latvian Centrist Party	LCP	156	0.13%	0
Valid votes		116,085	100.00%	14
Rejected votes		810	0.69%	
Valid envelopes		116,895	99.88%	
Rejected envelopes		136	0.12%	
Total polled		117,031	54.93%	
Registered electors		213,068		

The following candidates were elected: Uldis Augulis (ZZS), 15,226 votes; Ilmārs Dūrītis (AP), 13,289 votes; Krišjānis Feldmans (JKP), 19,298 votes; Kaspars Ģirģens (KPV LV), 25,629 votes; Ralfs Nemiro (KPV LV), 25,095 votes; Vitālijs Orlovs (SDPS), 13,120 votes; Artūrs Toms Plešs (AP), 13,448 votes; Jānis Reirs (JV), 10,668 votes; Sandis Riekstiņš (JKP), 17,530 votes; Inguna Rībena (NA), 18,475 votes; Edvīns Šnore (NA), 19,793 votes; Viktors Valainis (ZZS), 15,730 votes; Jānis Vitenbergs (KPV LV), 24,116 votes; and Ivars Zariņš (SDPS), 13,656 votes.

===== 2014 =====
Results of the 2014 parliamentary election held on 4 October 2014:

Party		Votes	%	Seats
Union of Greens and Farmers	ZZS	35,738	28.27%	4
Unity	V	29,596	23.41%	3
National Alliance	NA	24,219	19.16%	3
Social Democratic Party "Harmony"	SDPS	14,411	11.40%	2
For Latvia from the Heart	NSL	9,306	7.36%	1
Latvian Association of Regions	LRA	6,775	5.36%	1
Latvian Russian Union	РСЛ	1,912	1.51%	0
United for Latvia	VL	1,519	1.20%	0
For Latvia's Development	LA	1,410	1.12%	0
New Conservative Party	JKP	909	0.72%	0
Izaugsme		229	0.18%	0
Freedom. Free from Fear, Hate and Anger		207	0.16%	0
Sovereignty		169	0.13%	0
Valid votes		126,400	100.00%	14
Rejected votes		983	0.77%	
Valid envelopes		127,383	99.93%	
Rejected envelopes		93	0.07%	
Total polled		127,476	56.49%	
Registered electors		225,675		

The following candidates were elected: Uldis Augulis (ZZS), 39,062 votes; Raimonds Bergmanis (ZZS),39,230 votes; Andris Bērziņš (ZZS), 37,250 votes; Augusts Brigmanis (ZZS), 41,125 votes; Andris Buiķis (NA), 26,144 votes; Atis Lejiņš (V), 32,776 votes; Dainis Liepiņš (LRA), 7,358 votes; Aivars Meija (NSL), 9,900 votes; Vitālijs Orlovs (SDPS), 17,114 votes; Imants Parādnieks (NA), 26,498 votes; Jānis Reirs (V), 32,073 votes; Edvīns Šnore (NA), 29,789 votes; Juris Šulcs (V), 31,592 votes; and Zenta Tretjaka (SDPS), 15,875 votes.

===== 2011 =====
Results of the 2011 parliamentary election held on 17 September 2011:

Party		Votes	%	Seats
Zatlers' Reform Party	ZRP	34,292	26.04%	4
Unity	V	26,590	20.19%	3
Harmony Centre	SC	22,948	17.43%	3
Union of Greens and Farmers	ZZS	21,083	16.01%	3
National Alliance	NA	20,660	15.69%	2
Latvia's First Party/Latvian Way	LPP/LC	2,458	1.87%	0
For Human Rights in a United Latvia	ЗаПЧЕЛ	951	0.72%	0
Last Party	PP	565	0.43%	0
Freedom. Free from Fear, Hate and Anger		505	0.38%	0
Latvian Social Democratic Workers' Party	LSDSP	468	0.36%	0
For a Presidential Republic	PPR	411	0.31%	0
People's Control	TK	406	0.31%	0
Christian Democratic Union	KDS	348	0.26%	0
Valid votes		131,685	100.00%	15
Rejected votes		1,470	1.10%	
Valid envelopes		133,155	99.87%	
Rejected envelopes		170	0.13%	
Total polled		133,325	57.36%	
Registered electors		232,418		

The following candidates were elected: Uldis Augulis (ZZS), 22,132 votes; Andris Bērziņš (ZZS), 22,591 votes; Augusts Brigmanis (ZZS), 23,271 votes; Atis Lejiņš (V), 30,472 votes; Klāvs Olšteins (ZRP), 39,133 votes; Vitālijs Orlovs (SC), 27,061 votes; Jānis Ozoliņš (ZRP), 38,739 votes; Imants Parādnieks (NA), 24,793 votes; Vineta Poriņa (NA), 22,450 votes; Jānis Reirs (V), 27,469 votes; Vladimirs Reskājs (SC), 24,966 votes; Viktors Valainis (ZRP), 36,430 votes; Inga Vanaga (ZRP), 36,490 votes; Dzintars Zaķis (V), 29,294 votes; and Ivars Zariņš (SC), 25,507 votes.

===== 2010 =====
Results of the 2010 parliamentary election held on 2 October 2010:

Party		Votes	%	Seats
Unity	V	47,789	35.09%	6
Union of Greens and Farmers	ZZS	38,116	27.99%	5
Harmony Centre	SC	20,648	15.16%	2
National Alliance	NA	12,455	9.15%	1
For a Good Latvia	PL	8,879	6.52%	1
For Human Rights in a United Latvia	ЗаПЧЕЛ	1,767	1.30%	0
Made in Latvia	RL	1,743	1.28%	0
Last Party	PP	1,316	0.97%	0
For a Presidential Republic	PPR	1,135	0.83%	0
Responsibility – Social Democratic Alliance of Political Parties	ATBILDĪBA	936	0.69%	0
People's Control	TK	709	0.52%	0
Christian Democratic Union	KDS	459	0.34%	0
Daugava – For Latvia	ZRP	223	0.16%	0
Valid votes		136,175	100.00%	15
Rejected votes		3,447	2.47%	
Valid envelopes		139,622	99.90%	
Rejected envelopes		139	0.10%	
Total polled		139,761	60.21%	
Registered electors		232,137		

The following candidates were elected: Uldis Augulis (ZZS), 39,357 votes; Andris Bērziņš (ZZS), 39,709 votes; Augusts Brigmanis (ZZS), 42,495 votes; Aivars Dronka (ZZS), 37,625 votes; Sarmīte Ēlerte (V), 53,607 votes; Valentīns Grigorjevs (SC), 22,433 votes; Artis Kampars (V), 54,134 votes; Atis Lejiņš (V), 54,758 votes; Klāvs Olšteins (V), 49,412 votes; Vitālijs Orlovs (SC), 25,287 votes; Imants Parādnieks (NA), 15,541 votes; Dace Reinika (ZZS), 38,552 votes; Andris Šķēle (PL), 11,643 votes; Aigars Štokenbergs (V), 53,976 votes; and Dzintars Zaķis (V), 52,768 votes.

==== 2000s ====
===== 2006 =====
Results of the 2006 parliamentary election held on 7 October 2006:

Party		Votes per district							Total votes	%	Seats
Party		Aizkr- aukle	Bauska	Dobele	Jēkab- pils	Jel- gava City	Jel- gava	Tukums	Total votes	%	Seats
Union of Greens and Farmers	ZZS	3,572	5,220	4,150	3,827	4,362	3,013	7,299	31,443	24.18%	4
People's Party	TP	4,613	5,112	3,358	4,474	4,417	2,544	5,241	29,759	22.89%	4
New Era Party	JL	2,954	3,674	2,268	3,485	3,895	2,134	4,411	22,821	17.55%	3
Latvia's First Party/Latvian Way	LPP/LC	1,178	1,273	952	2,238	2,061	972	1,756	10,430	8.02%	1
For Fatherland and Freedom/LNNK	TB/LNNK	1,199	1,593	889	1,240	1,749	685	1,657	9,012	6.93%	1
Harmony Centre	SC	612	618	333	2,022	2,322	501	501	6,909	5.31%	1
For Human Rights in a United Latvia	ЗаПЧЕЛ	590	336	292	956	2,283	459	276	5,192	3.99%	1
Latvian Social Democratic Workers' Party	LSDSP	629	565	409	692	826	333	623	4,077	3.14%	0
All for Latvia!		314	424	297	429	399	309	460	2,632	2.02%	0
Motherland		104	248	100	115	1,044	322	110	2,043	1.57%	0
New Democrats	NJD	281	267	279	227	354	237	361	2,006	1.54%	0
Pensioners and Seniors Party	PSP	240	179	99	174	167	105	211	1,175	0.90%	0
Māra's Land		104	104	81	125	135	64	108	721	0.55%	0
Eurosceptics		78	114	84	74	124	40	111	625	0.48%	0
Our Land Party		52	37	36	84	56	45	64	374	0.29%	0
Social Fairness Party	STP	36	30	82	49	30	15	33	275	0.21%	0
Latvian's Latvia National Political Defence Organisation		18	14	20	29	24	17	85	207	0.16%	0
Fatherland Union	TS	29	20	20	21	33	9	30	162	0.12%	0
National Power Union	NSS	21	24	20	24	26	14	26	155	0.12%	0
Valid votes		16,624	19,852	13,769	20,285	24,307	11,818	23,363	130,018	100.00%	15
Rejected votes									889	0.68%	
Valid envelopes									130,907	99.88%	
Rejected envelopes									153	0.12%	
Total polled									131,060	57.74%	
Registered electors									226,977		

The following candidates were elected: Dzintars Ābiķis (TP), 31,259 votes; Andris Bērziņš (ZZS), 33,499 votes; Valery Bukhvalov (ЗаПЧЕЛ), 6,005 votes; Artis Kampars (JL), 23,738 votes; Leons Līdums (TP), 30,056 votes; Vitālijs Orlovs (SC), 8,575 votes; Karina Pētersone (LPP/LC), 10,934 votes; Jānis Reirs (JL), 23,410 votes; Baiba Rivža (ZZS), 33,068 votes; Viktors Ščerbatihs (ZZS), 33,341 votes; Atis Slakteris (TP), 32,451 votes; Dagnija Staķe (ZZS), 34,840 votes; Pēteris Tabūns (TB/LNNK), 9,768 votes; Imants Valers (TP), 29,745 votes; and Dzintars Zaķis (JL), 23,870 votes.

===== 2002 =====
Results of the 2002 parliamentary election held on 5 October 2002:

Party		Votes per district							Total votes	%	Seats
Party		Aizkr- aukle	Bauska	Dobele	Jēkab- pils	Jel- gava City	Jel- gava	Tukums	Total votes	%	Seats
New Era Party	JL	4,393	6,052	3,883	5,467	6,369	3,401	8,132	37,697	25.56%	4
People's Party	TP	3,916	5,574	3,950	4,433	4,176	2,418	5,287	29,754	20.18%	4
Latvia's First Party	LPP	2,493	2,862	1,970	2,404	3,134	1,592	3,064	17,519	11.88%	2
Union of Greens and Farmers	ZZS	2,856	2,609	2,123	2,662	1,936	1,651	3,438	17,275	11.72%	2
For Human Rights in a United Latvia	ЗаПЧЕЛ	1,272	983	727	3,592	4,653	1,161	1,019	13,407	9.09%	2
For Fatherland and Freedom/LNNK	TB/LNNK	1,047	1,477	872	1,233	1,442	727	1,535	8,333	5.65%	1
Latvian Way	LC	1,140	994	895	1,175	1,068	695	1,764	7,731	5.24%	0
Latvian Social Democratic Workers' Party	LSDSP	1,013	777	853	1,006	1,172	653	1,172	6,646	4.51%	0
Social Democratic Union	SDS	403	429	294	501	469	399	426	2,921	1.98%	0
Social Democratic Welfare Party	SDLP	131	278	145	265	636	278	141	1,874	1.27%	0
Political Alliance "Centre"		171	171	211	220	225	93	293	1,384	0.94%	0
Russian Party		74	52	44	217	148	56	59	650	0.44%	0
Latvians' Party	LP	72	84	69	93	82	49	97	546	0.37%	0
Latvian Revival Party	LAP	118	62	59	114	58	45	59	515	0.35%	0
Light of Latgale	LG	45	22	25	90	95	21	20	318	0.22%	0
Freedom Party	BP	33	26	24	44	29	36	39	231	0.16%	0
Citizens' Union "Our Land"		50	28	29	36	32	15	33	223	0.15%	0
Māra's Land		28	25	23	40	37	17	39	209	0.14%	0
Progressive Centre Party	PCP	26	32	6	22	17	8	20	131	0.09%	0
Latvian United Republican Party	LARP	17	15	15	14	15	7	12	95	0.06%	0
Valid votes		19,298	22,552	16,217	23,628	25,793	13,322	26,649	147,459	100.00%	15
Rejected votes									768	0.52%	
Valid envelopes									148,227	99.77%	
Rejected envelopes									343	0.23%	
Total polled									148,570	69.67%	
Registered electors									213,251		

The following candidates were elected: Andrejs Aleksejevs (ЗаПЧЕЛ), 15,093 votes; Andris Bērziņš (ZZS), 18,568 votes; Augusts Brigmanis (ZZS), 19,225 votes; Jānis Esta (TP), 30,278 votes; Artis Kampars (JL), 39,231 votes; Vineta Muižniece (JL), 38,964 votes; Vitālijs Orlovs (ЗаПЧЕЛ), 15,264 votes; Krišjānis Peters (LPP), 18,504 votes; Mihails Pietkevičs (TP), 29,759 votes; Jānis Reirs (JL), 39,144 votes; Anna Seile (TB/LNNK), 9,572 votes; Jevgenija Stalidzāne (LPP), 18,835 votes; Dzintars Zaķis (JL), 39,005 votes; Ērika Zommere (TP), 30,199 votes; and Ēriks Zunda (TP), 30,240 votes.

==== 1990s ====
===== 1998 =====
Results of the 1998 parliamentary election held on 3 October 1998:

Party		Votes per district							Total votes	%	Seats
Party		Aizkr- aukle	Bauska	Dobele	Jēkab- pils	Jel- gava City	Jel- gava	Tukums	Total votes	%	Seats
People's Party	TP	4,444	5,955	4,343	5,270	5,137	2,799	6,306	34,254	23.90%	4
Latvian Way	LC	4,056	4,008	3,000	4,124	3,262	2,609	4,784	25,843	18.03%	3
Latvian Social Democratic Workers' Party	LSDA	3,182	3,767	2,907	3,675	3,881	2,287	4,221	23,920	16.69%	3
For Fatherland and Freedom/LNNK	TB/LNNK	2,383	3,133	2,077	2,668	3,498	1,546	4,454	19,759	13.79%	2
New Party	JP	1,729	2,010	1,550	1,996	2,262	1,188	2,256	12,991	9.06%	2
National Harmony Party	TSP	670	391	357	2,542	2,120	595	436	7,111	4.96%	1
People's Movement for Latvia	TKL	672	435	407	937	1,666	558	674	5,349	3.73%	0
Latvian Farmers' Union	LZS	533	777	671	756	593	599	762	4,691	3.27%	0
Workers' Party, Christian Democratic Union and Latvian Green Party	DP–KDS–LZP	447	558	310	594	439	253	645	3,246	2.26%	0
Democratic Party "Saimnieks"		204	272	124	557	172	83	209	1,621	1.13%	0
Latvian Revival Party	LAP	92	135	79	110	100	57	123	696	0.49%	0
Latvian Unity Party	LVP	87	145	87	95	93	42	98	647	0.45%	0
National Progress Party	NPP	18	118	31	30	250	77	101	625	0.44%	0
Social Democratic Women's Organisation	SDSO	86	73	67	89	76	42	112	545	0.38%	0
Latvian National Democratic Party	LNDP	129	57	36	100	42	22	75	461	0.32%	0
Popular Movement "Freedom"		52	64	88	71	43	38	73	429	0.30%	0
Māra's Land	MZ	37	86	51	39	30	37	51	331	0.23%	0
Helsinki-86		35	38	31	41	35	34	116	330	0.23%	0
Conservative Party	KP	51	28	25	52	40	30	54	280	0.20%	0
Democrats' Party	DP	18	17	18	32	17	14	19	135	0.09%	0
Latvian National Reform Party	LNRP	8	8	2	12	4	4	20	58	0.04%	0
Valid votes		18,933	22,075	16,261	23,790	23,760	12,914	25,589	143,322	100.00%	15
Rejected votes		102	123	77	177	112	71	101	763	0.53%	
Valid envelopes		19,035	22,198	16,338	23,967	23,872	12,985	25,690	144,085	99.71%	
Rejected envelopes									426	0.29%	
Total polled									144,511	71.88%	
Registered electors									201,054		

The following candidates were elected: Jānis Bunkšs (LC), 26,420 votes; Jānis Čevers (LSDA), 25,459 votes; Silvija Dreimane (JP), 13,719 votes; Jānis Esta (TP), 35,164 votes; Edvīns Inkēns (LC), 26,682 votes; Aigars Kalvītis (TP), 35,092 votes; Kārlis Leiškalns (LC), 26,987 votes; Jānis Leja (LSDA), 25,536 votes; Andrejs Požarnovs (TB/LNNK), 21,203 votes; Boriss Rastropirkins (TSP), 8,061 votes; Arnis Razminovičs (TP), 35,077 votes; Kaspars Riekstiņš (LSDA), 25,526 votes; Atis Slakteris (TP), 36,714 votes; Jevgenija Stalidzāne (JP), 13,809 votes; and Pēteris Tabūns (TB/LNNK), 20,972 votes.

===== 1995 =====
Results of the 1995 parliamentary election held on 30 September and 1 October 1995:

Party		Votes	%	Seats
People's Movement for Latvia	TKL	33,497	23.29%	4
Democratic Party "Saimnieks"	DPS	23,033	16.01%	3
Latvian Way	LC	19,371	13.47%	3
For Fatherland and Freedom	TB	15,031	10.45%	2
Latvian Unity Party	LVP	11,070	7.70%	1
Latvian Farmers' Union, Christian Democratic Union and Latgalian Labour Party	LZS-KDS-LDP	9,501	6.61%	1
Latvian National Conservative Party and Latvian Green Party	LNNK-LZP	8,016	5.57%	1
Labour and Justice Coalition: LDDP, LSDSP and LACAP	LDDP-LSDSP-LACAP	7,011	4.87%	0
National Harmony Party	TSP	3,541	2.46%	0
Socialist Party of Latvia	LSP	3,362	2.34%	0
Political Union of Economists	TPA	2,320	1.61%	0
Latvian Farmers' Union	LZS	2,249	1.56%	0
Political Association of the Underprivileged and Latvian Independence Party		1,564	1.09%	0
Popular Front of Latvia	LTF	1,413	0.98%	0
Party of Russian Citizens in Latvia	ПргЛ	1,024	0.71%	0
Citizens Union "Our Land" – Anti-Communist Union		962	0.67%	0
Democrats' Party	DP	413	0.29%	0
Latvian Liberal Party	LLP	295	0.21%	0
Latvian National Democratic Party	LNDP	163	0.11%	0
Valid votes		143,836	100.00%	15

The following candidates were elected: Romāns Apsītis (LC), 18,715 votes; Vents Balodis (TB), 15,417 votes; Jānis Bunkšs (LC), 18,637 votes; Juris Celmiņš (DPS), 23,605 votes; Guntis Eniņš (TKL), 35,943 votes; Modris Goba (DPS), 23,631 votes; Ervids Grinovskis (LZS-KDS-LDP), 11,957 votes; Janīna Kušnere (TKL), 36,001 votes; Aristids Jēkabs Lambergs (LNNK-LZP), 8,508 votes; Jānis Mauliņš (TKL), 36,087 votes; Modris Plāte (TKL), 36,178 votes; Andrejs Požarnovs (TB), 15,688 votes; Jānis Rāzna (DPS), 23,405 votes; Jānis Rubulis (LVP), 12,642 votes; and Andris Tomašūns (LC), 18,593 votes.

===== 1993 =====
Results of the 1993 parliamentary election held on 5 and 6 June 1993:

Party		Votes per district							Total votes	%	Seats
Party		Aizkr- aukle	Bauska	Dobele	Jēkab- pils	Jel- gava City	Jel- gava	Tukums	Total votes	%	Seats
Latvian Way	LC	8,542	8,344	6,514	9,399	6,481	5,157	10,204	54,641	31.27%	5
Latvian National Independence Movement	LNNK	3,746	4,094	3,641	2,912	11,914	4,751	6,483	37,541	21.48%	4
Latvian Farmers' Union	LZS	2,868	4,096	2,534	5,978	2,255	2,320	5,925	25,976	14.86%	3
Harmony for Latvia	SL	2,281	2,458	1,885	2,319	2,393	1,237	1,536	14,109	8.07%	1
Christian Democratic Union	KDS	1,527	1,265	789	1,190	1,392	632	1,416	8,211	4.70%	1
Democratic Center Party of Latvia	DCP	1,094	1,504	1,018	1,020	1,413	877	1,228	8,154	4.67%	1
For Fatherland and Freedom	TB	922	984	905	1,733	1,203	464	1,197	7,408	4.24%	1
Popular Front of Latvia	LTF	692	530	526	1,043	533	375	888	4,587	2.62%	0
Equal Rights	Р	229	118	109	1,879	486	342	159	3,322	1.90%	0
Green List		264	319	233	255	352	176	457	2,056	1.18%	0
Latvia's Happiness		264	249	228	304	249	163	273	1,730	0.99%	0
Democratic Labour Party of Latvia	LDDP	198	215	176	327	298	150	321	1,685	0.96%	0
Russian National Democratic List		171	82	63	404	410	204	102	1,436	0.82%	0
Citizens Union "Our Land"		166	222	114	205	158	98	185	1,148	0.66%	0
Republican Platform		171	212	123	121	123	146	118	1,014	0.58%	0
Anti-Communist Union		99	154	85	221	114	62	156	891	0.51%	0
Independents' Union		45	34	89	49	71	36	71	395	0.23%	0
Latvian Liberal Party	LLP	38	54	35	73	35	30	38	303	0.17%	0
Latvian Unity Party	LVP	27	12	15	38	15	15	19	141	0.08%	0
Valid votes		23,344	24,946	19,082	29,470	29,895	17,235	30,776	174,748	100.00%	16
Rejected votes		198	231	77	406	400	241	267	1,820	1.03%	
Valid envelopes		23,542	25,177	19,159	29,876	30,295	17,476	31,043	176,568	100.00%	

The following candidates were elected: Gundars Bērziņš (LZS), 26,473 votes; Olafs Brūvers (KDS), 8,490 votes; Aivars Endziņš (LC), 52,312 votes; Māris Gailis (LC), 51,294 votes; Ilga Gore (DCP), 8,765 votes; Oskars Grīgs (LZS), 26,860 votes; Andris Kadeģis (LC), 51,253 votes; Viesturs Pauls Karnups (LNNK), 36,871 votes; Aristids Lambergs (LNNK), 37,518 votes; Roberts Milbergs (TB), 7,957 votes; Egīls Radziņš (LC), 50,704 votes; Joachim Siegerist (LNNK), 44,128 votes; Antita Stankēviča (LC), 52,785 votes; Pēteris Tabūns (LNNK), 50,011 votes; Zigurds Tomiņš (LZS), 26,102 votes; and Jevģenijs Zaščerinskis (SL), 14,388 votes.

==== 1930s ====
===== 1931 =====
Results of the 1931 parliamentary election held on 3 and 4 October 1931:

Party		Votes per county					Total votes	%	Seats
Party		Bauska	Ilūkste	Jēkab- pils	Jel- gava	Tukums	Total votes	%	Seats
Latvian Farmers' Union	LZS	4,801	2,424	4,742	11,161	4,147	27,275	19.17%	3
Latvian Social Democratic Workers' Party	LSDSP	4,141	2,065	4,468	12,291	4,026	26,991	18.97%	3
Latvian New Farmers and Small Landowners Party	LJSP	2,499	2,484	2,585	3,097	3,816	14,481	10.18%	2
Democratic Centre	DC	1,306	623	1,480	4,223	1,639	9,271	6.52%	1
Leftist Workers and Farm Labourers	KSDZ	600	1,254	1,317	3,887	804	7,862	5.53%	1
German-Baltic Party in Latvia	DbPL	256	493	170	3,351	1,851	6,121	4.30%	1
Christian Peasants and Catholics	KZK	1,760	2,488	210	1,227	176	5,861	4.12%	1
New Farmers' Association	JZA	1,357	612	1,865	678	506	5,018	3.53%	1
Latvian Polish Union Polish-Catholics	ZPwŁ	13	4,541	66	211	18	4,849	3.41%	1
Party of Former Money Depositors	ANNTT	960	507	1,169	1,256	643	4,535	3.19%	1
Christian Union and Workers	KAS	853	263	453	2,105	779	4,453	3.13%	0
Progressive Association	PA	482	213	681	2,252	729	4,357	3.06%	0
United List of Semigallia Jews		578	615	604	1,552	351	3,700	2.60%	0
Orthodox, Old Believers and United Russian Organizations	П	19	2,782	305	447	64	3,617	2.54%	0
Progressive Peasants and New Peasants of Semigallia		32	1,693	113	1,130	141	3,109	2.19%	0
Lithuanian Catholics and Belarusians		31	1,115	128	1,825	6	3,105	2.18%	0
Latvian Labour Union	LDS	320	74	627	1,170	245	2,436	1.71%	0
Women's Organisations		223	67	231	972	383	1,876	1.32%	0
National Union	NA	110	52	153	592	384	1,291	0.91%	0
Russian Old Believers Working People's Voters	РС	84	229	98	186	18	615	0.43%	0
Latvian Social Democratic Opposition Workers		36	2	35	419	26	518	0.36%	0
Workers and Poor Peasants	SNZ	76	127	78	127	57	465	0.33%	0
Unsatisfied New Farmers, Small Landholders and Fishermen		76	41	60	203	64	444	0.31%	0
Valid votes		20,613	24,764	21,638	54,362	20,873	142,250	100.00%	15
Rejected votes							1,108	0.77%	
Valid envelopes							143,358	99.96%	
Rejected envelopes							64	0.04%	
Total polled							143,422		

==== 1920s ====
===== 1928 =====
Results of the 1928 parliamentary election held on 6 and 7 October 1928:

Party		Votes per county						Total votes	%	Seats
Party		Bauska	Ilūkste	Jēkab- pils	Jel- gava	Tukums	County comm- ission	Total votes	%	Seats
Latvian Social Democratic Workers' Party	LSDSP	5,707	3,489	6,302	16,643	5,767	59	37,967	27.48%	4
Latvian Farmers' Union	LZS	6,506	2,628	6,270	12,351	5,142	20	32,917	23.82%	4
Latvian New Farmers and Small Landowners Party	LJSP	1,209	2,052	1,776	1,522	1,807	22	8,388	6.07%	1
Leftist Workers and Farm Labourers	KSDZ	1,052	1,320	2,359	2,623	904	6	8,264	5.98%	1
German-Baltic Party in Latvia	DbPL	272	497	199	3,141	1,076	6	5,191	3.76%	1
Latvian Polish-Catholic Union	ZPwŁ	13	4,457	59	222	23	54	4,828	3.49%	1
Christian Union and Workers Party	KASP	460	109	795	2,467	959	3	4,793	3.47%	1
Christian Peasant and Catholic Party	KZKP	1,528	2,499	141	400	110	27	4,705	3.40%	1
Orthodox, Old Believers and United Russian Organizations	П	86	2,729	299	520	61	48	3,743	2.71%	1
Union of Social Democrats and Farmers		1,034	591	647	870	477	12	3,631	2.63%	1
Latvian New Farmers' Union	LJS	225	106	241	1,502	430	3	2,507	1.81%	0
National Union	NA	291	138	653	818	539	2	2,441	1.77%	0
Party of Former Money Depositors and Other Victims		664	154	710	599	286	3	2,416	1.75%	0
United Lithuanians and Catholics		46	811	82	1,298	9	22	2,268	1.64%	0
Democratic Centre	DC	280	183	257	1,041	348	8	2,117	1.53%	0
All-Latvian National Assembly		737	512	241	285	310	6	2,091	1.51%	0
Latvian Labour Union	LDS	200	244	378	977	256	3	2,058	1.49%	0
Union for Peace, Order and Production	MKRA	205	94	424	849	210	3	1,785	1.29%	0
Economic Centre, Soldiers, Merchants. Industrialists and Craftsmen		135	23	86	834	86	0	1,164	0.84%	0
Latvian Women's Union		116	57	136	717	132	2	1,160	0.84%	0
Latgallian Independent Socialist Party	LNSP	110	154	164	564	92	0	1,084	0.78%	0
Radical Democrats		89	146	153	389	92	0	869	0.63%	0
United Farmers		113	33	260	292	34	0	732	0.53%	0
Agudas Israel		72	307	126	8	9	4	526	0.38%	0
Zionist Organisation Mizrachi		94	82	66	22	24	2	290	0.21%	0
People's Rights and Health Defenders		131	8	24	67	22	0	252	0.18%	0
Valid votes		21,375	23,423	22,848	51,021	19,205	315	138,187	100.00%	16
Rejected votes								874	0.63%	
Valid envelopes								139,061	99.94%	
Rejected envelopes								77	0.06%	
Total polled								139,138		

===== 1925 =====
Results of the 1925 parliamentary election held on 3 and 4 October 1925:

Party		Votes per county						Total votes	%	Seats		
Party		Bauska	Ilūkste	Jēkab- pils	Jel- gava	Tukums	County comm- ission	Total votes	%	Con.	Com.	Tot.
Latvian Social Democratic Workers' Party	LSDSP	5,578	2,928	7,250	17,141	5,622	10	38,529	30.60%	5	0	5
Latvian Farmers' Union	LZS	5,946	3,369	5,328	10,160	4,950	2	29,755	23.63%	4	0	4
Social Democrats Mensheviks	SDM	2,474	2,252	1,246	2,329	967	5	9,273	7.37%	1	0	1
Polish-Catholic Latvian Union of Poles	PKLPS	11	5,884	62	90	9	0	6,056	4.81%	1	0	1
Democratic Centre	DC	631	340	538	2,488	640	4	4,641	3.69%	1	0	1
Latvian New Farmers' Union	LJS	513	251	462	2,120	929	5	4,280	3.40%	1	0	1
Party of Catholics and Christian Peasants	KKZP	1,205	2,238	127	350	51	0	3,971	3.15%	1	0	1
Latvian New Farmers-Small Landowners Party	LJSP	419	397	988	1,045	1,031	0	3,880	3.08%	1	0	1
Christian National Union	KNS	409	63	273	1,994	608	2	3,349	2.66%	0	0	0
German-Baltic Party in Latvia	DbPL	280	101	137	2,206	610	0	3,334	2.65%	0	0	0
Congress of Destroyed Areas and Agricultural Association		364	581	1,174	857	180	1	3,157	2.51%	0	0	0
Old Believers	V	11	2,294	213	186	7	0	2,711	2.15%	0	0	0
National Union	NA	269	209	518	1,077	499	5	2,577	2.05%	0	0	0
Zionist Organisation Mizrachi		429	288	301	873	309	0	2,200	1.75%	0	0	0
Union for Peace, Order and Production	MKRA	116	36	283	991	360	0	1,786	1.42%	0	0	0
National Farmers' Union	NZS	364	54	265	415	331	0	1,429	1.14%	0	0	0
Union of Orthodox Voters and Russian Organisations	П	12	566	90	202	28	0	898	0.71%	0	0	0
Latvian Labour Union	LDS	124	39	166	381	159	0	869	0.69%	0	0	0
Combined Workers, Disabled People and Workers		109	20	95	488	65	0	777	0.62%	0	0	0
Ceire Cion		36	172	79	114	129	0	530	0.42%	0	0	0
Economically Active Citizens		56	39	102	207	64	0	468	0.37%	0	0	0
Union of Latvian Democrats	LDS	28	33	66	199	67	1	394	0.31%	0	0	0
Latvian Belarusian Landless Farmers, Workers and Small Peasant Citizens		14	260	13	39	3	0	329	0.26%	0	0	0
Jewish National Democratic Party		26	85	65	75	37	0	288	0.23%	0	0	0
Latgallian Farmers Party	LZP	4	115	13	26	16	0	174	0.14%	0	0	0
Latgallian Labour Party–Latgale Union of Smallholders and Stateless Persons	LDP-LMBS	15	43	24	30	18	0	130	0.10%	0	0	0
Russian Parishes and Public Employees		5	59	6	36	7	0	113	0.09%	0	0	0
Valid votes		19,448	22,716	19,884	46,119	17,696	35	125,898	100.00%	15	0	15
Rejected votes												
Valid envelopes												
Rejected envelopes												
Total polled												
Registered electors		28,965	28,401	28,793	61,127	26,656		173,942				

===== 1922 =====
Results of the 1922 parliamentary election held on 7 and 8 October 1922:

Party		Votes per county					Total votes	%	Seats		
Party		Bauska	Ilūkste	Jaun- jel- gava	Jel- gava	Tukums	Total votes	%	Con.	Com.	Tot.
Latvian Social Democratic Workers' Party	LSDSP	6,480	3,704	9,608	12,114	6,324	38,230	31.51%			5
Latvian Farmers' Union	LZS	6,878	3,703	6,858	9,852	5,543	32,834	27.06%			4
Union of Social Democrats – Mensheviks and Rural Workers	SDML	2,699	3,284	2,313	3,112	1,678	13,086	10.79%			2
Democratic Centre	DC	997	428	996	3,322	1,327	7,070	5.83%			1
List of Lithuanians and Catholics	LK	837	5,412	282	346	50	6,927	5.71%			1
Christian National Union	KNS	825	184	498	2,905	1,625	6,037	4.98%			1
German-Baltic Party in Latvia	DbPL	328	146	213	2,444	676	3,807	3.14%			1
Non-Partisan National Centre	BNC	553	392	624	1,335	645	3,549	2.93%			1
Latvian New Farmers' Union	LJS	403	127	510	1,440	963	3,443	2.84%	0	0	0
Latvian Central Committee of Old Believers	LVCK	6	1,894	235	114	9	2,258	1.86%	0	0	0
United Jewish National Bloc	EANB	279	59	381	786	391	1,896	1.56%	0	0	0
Land Workers' Association		93	73	118	425	126	835	0.69%	0	0	0
Agudas Israel		151	456	89	62	25	783	0.65%	0	0	0
Latvian Fishermen's Union and Group of Sailors		17	8	9	137	125	296	0.24%	0	0	0
Ceire Cion	CC	86	37	15	42	92	272	0.22%	0	0	0
Valid votes		20,632	19,907	22,749	38,436	19,599	121,323	100.00%	15	1	16
Rejected votes							1,153	0.94%			
Valid envelopes							122,476				
Rejected envelopes											
Total polled											
Registered electors		26,129	22,622	28,253	45,031	24,660	146,695				
