= Fifteenth Saeima of Latvia =

Parliament of Latvia 2026–2030

The Fifteenth Saeima of Latvia (Latvian: 15. Saeima) was elected in the 2026 Latvian parliamentary election held on 3 October 2026.

== Election ==
The 100 members of the Saeima are elected by open list proportional representation from five multi-member constituencies (Kurzeme, Latgale, Riga (in which overseas votes are counted), Vidzeme and Zemgale) between 11 and 38 seats in size. Seats are allocated using the Sainte-Laguë method with a national electoral threshold of 5%.

| Party | Votes | % | Seats | +/– |
|---|---|---|---|---|
| United List | 283,892 | 35.76 | 41 | +26 |
| Latvia First | 105,198 | 13.25 | 17 | +8 |
| Sovereign Power–Alliance of Young Latvians | 94,211 | 11.87 | 15 | +15 |
| National Alliance | 71,579 | 9.02 | 10 | –3 |
| The Progressives | 63,382 | 7.98 | 10 | 0 |
| New Unity | 51,183 | 6.45 | 7 | –19 |
| Union of Greens and Farmers | 35,405 | 4.46 | 0 | –16 |
| We Change the Rules | 27,579 | 3.47 | 0 | 0 |
| For Latvia's Development | 17,533 | 2.21 | 0 | 0 |
| For Stability! | 16,062 | 2.02 | 0 | –11 |
| Rising Sun for Latvia | 10,696 | 1.35 | 0 | New |
| Gobzems' List | 7,900 | 1.00 | 0 | 0 |
| Harmony Centre | 6,598 | 0.83 | 0 | 0 |
| New Conservative Party | 2,628 | 0.33 | 0 | 0 |
| Total | 793,846 | 100.00 | 100 | 0 |
| Valid votes | 793,846 | 98.41 | | |
| Invalid/blank votes | 12,802 | 1.59 | | |
| Total votes | 806,648 | 100.00 | | |
| Registered voters/turnout | 1,557,615 | 51.79 | | |
Source: Central Electoral Commission

== Composition ==
This list contains all MPs who have served in the Fifteenth Saeima.

| Constituency | MP | Party or Political alliance | | Political group | | In office | | Birth date | Notes | Ref. |
| Constituency | MP | Elected | Current | Initial | Current | Since | Until | Birth date | Notes | Ref. |
|---|---|---|---|---|---|---|---|---|---|---|
| Rīga | Liene Apine | AS (LRA) | AS (LRA) | AS | AS | 3 November 2026 | | | | |
| Zemgale | Baiba Atmane | AS (LZP) | AS (LZP) | AS | AS | 3 November 2026 | | | | |
| Vidzeme | Česlavs Batņa | AS (LRA) | AS (LRA) | AS | AS | 1 November 2022 | 20 November 2026 | 2 August 1979 | Temporarily resigned as an MP after being approved as minister of education and science on 17 November 2026. | |
| Vidzeme | Raimonds Bergmanis | AS (LZP) | AS (LZP) | AS | AS | 6 November 2018 (Note: Raimonds Bergmanis also served as an MP between 2014 and 2015.) | | 25 July 1966 | | |
| Vidzeme | Anete Biķe | AS (LRA) | AS (LRA) | AS | AS | 3 November 2026 | | | | |
| Rīga | Valters Bolevics | AS (Ind.) | AS (Ind.) | AS | AS | 20 November 2026 | | | Temporarily assumed office as an MP after Viesturs Vitovskis was approved as minister of justice on 17 November 2026. | |
| Rīga | Mārtiņš Brencis | AS (Ind.) | AS (Ind.) | AS | AS | 3 November 2026 | | | | |
| Vidzeme | Andis Caunītis | AS (LRA) | AS (LRA) | AS | AS | 3 November 2026 (Note: Andis Caunītis also served as an MP between 2010 and 2011.) | | 9 April 1971 | | |
| Kurzeme | Māris Dadzis | AS (LRA) | AS (LRA) | AS | AS | 20 November 2026 | | | Temporarily assumed office as an MP after Edgars Putra was approved as minister of agriculture on 17 November 2026. | |
| Vidzeme | Pēteris Dimants | AS (LZP) | AS (LZP) | AS | AS | 3 November 2026 | | | | |
| Kurzeme | Jānis Džeriņš | AS (LP) | AS (LP) | AS | AS | 3 November 2026 | | | | |
| Rīga | Lauris Gruntmanis | AS (LRA) | AS (LRA) | AS | AS | 20 November 2026 | | | Temporarily assumed office as an MP after Edgars Štelmahers was approved as minister of economics on 17 November 2026. | |
| Rīga | Jānis Jenzis | AS (Ind.) | AS (Ind.) | AS | AS | 3 November 2026 | | | | |
| Kurzeme | Raivis Kalējs | AS (LRA) | AS (LRA) | AS | AS | 4 June 2026 | | 31 March 1989 | | |
| Vidzeme | Valdis Kārkliņš | AS (LZP) | AS (LZP) | AS | AS | 3 November 2026 | | | | |
| Kurzeme | Nellija Kleinberga | AS (LZP) | AS (LZP) | AS | AS | 3 November 2026 (Note: Nellija Kleinberga also served as an MP between 2014 and 2018.) | | 29 March 1964 | | |
| Latgale | Valdis Kotāns | AS (LRA) | AS (LRA) | AS | AS | 3 November 2026 | | | | |
| Kurzeme | Māris Kučinskis | AS (LP) | AS (LP) | AS | AS | 3 November 2026 (Note: Māris Kučinskis also served as an MP between 2003 and 2005, 2006 and 2011, 2014 and 2016, 2018 and 2022, as well as between 2023 and 2026.) | | 28 November 1961 | | |
| Rīga | Andris Kulbergs | AS (Ind.) | AS (Ind.) | AS | AS | 3 November 2026 (Note: Andris Kulbergs also served as an MP between 2022 and 2026.) | 20 November 2026 | 26 May 1979 | AS list leader in the Rīga constituency. Temporarily resigned as an MP after being approved as prime minister of Latvia on 17 November 2026. | |
| Rīga | Agnese Kupača | AS (LRA) | AS (LRA) | AS | AS | 3 November 2026 | | | | |
| Zemgale | Juris Lazdiņš | AS (LRA) | AS (LRA) | AS | AS | 3 November 2026 | | | | |
| Rīga | Jānis Liepiņš | AS (Ind.) | AS (Ind.) | AS | AS | 20 November 2026 | | | Temporarily assumed office as an MP after Andris Kulbergs was approved as prime minister of Latvia on 17 November 2026. | |
| Zemgale | Ilmārs Luksts | AS (LRA) | AS (LRA) | AS | AS | 3 November 2026 | | | | |
| Kurzeme | Linda Matisone | AS (LRA) | AS (LRA) | AS | AS | 1 November 2022 | | 23 April 1976 | | |
| Vidzeme | Dāvis Melnalksnis | AS (LRA) | AS (LRA) | AS | AS | 4 June 2026 | | 16 February 1993 | | |
| Rīga | Līga Meņģelsone | AS (Ind.) | AS (Ind.) | AS | AS | 3 November 2026 | | 31 May 1972 | | |
| Rīga | Karīna Miķelsone | AS (LRA) | AS (LRA) | AS | AS | 3 November 2026 | | 16 October 1983 | | |
| Rīga | Māris Ozoliņš | AS (LRA) | AS (LRA) | AS | AS | 3 November 2026 | | 4 November 1979 | | |
| Zemgale | Inga Priede | AS (LZP) | AS (LZP) | AS | AS | 11 June 2026 | | 29 July 1966 | | |
| Vidzeme | Mārtiņš Prīsis | AS (LZP) | AS (LZP) | AS | AS | 3 November 2026 | | | | |
| Vidzeme | Renārs Putniņš | AS (LZP) | AS (LZP) | AS | AS | 3 November 2026 (Note: Renārs Putniņš also served as an MP between 2017 and 2018.) | | 29 April 1976 | | |
| Kurzeme | Edgars Putra | AS (LP) | AS (LP) | AS | AS | 5 October 2023 (Note: Edgars Putra also served as an MP between 2014 and 2018, as well as 2022 and 2023.) | 20 November 2026 | 11 February 1983 | Temporarily resigned as an MP after being approved as minister of agriculture on 17 November 2026. | |
| Zemgale | Andris Skride | AS (I) | I | AS | AS | 3 November 2026 (Note: Andris Skride also served as an MP between 2018 and 2022.) | | 22 April 1982 | | |
| Vidzeme | Edvards Smiltēns | AS (LRA) | AS (LRA) | AS | AS | 1 November 2022 (Note: Edvards Smiltēns also served as an MP between 2010 and 2018.) | | 18 September 1984 | | |
| Rīga | Jānis Stērninieks | AS (LZP) | AS (LZP) | AS | AS | 3 November 2026 | | | | |
| Vidzeme | Dagnis Straubergs | AS (LRA) | AS (LRA) | AS | AS | 3 November 2026 | | 29 March 1969 | | |
| Vidzeme | Andrejs Svilāns | AS (LZP) | AS (LZP) | AS | AS | 19 June 2025 (Note: Andrejs Svilāns also served as an MP between 2022 and 2023.) | | 15 June 1968 | | |
| Rīga | Edgars Štelmahers | AS (LRA) | AS (LRA) | AS | AS | 3 November 2026 | 20 November 2026 | 10 April 1969 | Temporarily resigned as an MP after being approved as minister of economics on 17 November 2026. | |
| Zemgale | Edgars Tavars | AS (LZP) | AS (LZP) | AS | AS | 3 November 2026 (Note: Edgars Tavars also served as an MP between 2021 and 2026.) | 20 November 2026 | 12 August 1982 | Temporarily resigned as an MP after being approved as minister of smart administration and regional development on 17 November 2026. | |
| Zemgale | Māris Trušelis | AS (LZP) | AS (LZP) | AS | AS | 20 November 2026 | | | Temporarily assumed office as an MP after Edgars Tavars was approved as minister of smart administration and regional development on 17 November 2026. | |
| Rīga | Jānis Urtāns | AS (LZP) | AS (LZP) | AS | AS | 3 November 2026 | | | | |
| Vidzeme | Luīze Utāne | AS (LRA) | AS (LRA) | AS | AS | 20 November 2026 | | | Temporarily assumed office as an MP after Česlavs Batņa was approved as minister of education and science on 17 November 2026, and Valmiera Municipality Council deputy Ringolds Arnītis declined to take up the seat. | |
| Latgale | Raimonds Vējonis | AS (LZP) | AS (LZP) | AS | AS | 3 November 2026 (Note: Raimonds Vējonis also served as an MP between 2006 and 2015.) | | 15 June 1966 | Served as the president of Latvia from 8 July 2015 to 8 July 2019. | |
| Latgale | Juris Viļums | AS (LRA) | AS (LRA) | AS | AS | 1 November 2022 (Note: Juris Viļums also served as an MP between 2011 and 2018.) | | 13 April 1982 | | |
| Rīga | Viesturs Vitovskis | AS (LRA) | AS (LRA) | AS | AS | 3 November 2026 | 20 November 2026 | 11 June 1983 | Temporarily resigned as an MP after being approved as minister of justice on 17 November 2026. | |
| Vidzeme | Aiva Vīksna | AS (Ind.) | AS (Ind.) | AS | AS | 1 November 2022 | | 8 November 1967 | | |
| Rīga | Guntars Vītols | AS (Ind.) | AS (Ind.) | AS | AS | 3 November 2026 | | | | |
| Rīga | Maija Armaņeva | LPV | LPV | LPV | LPV | 3 November 2026 | | 4 November 1983 | | |
| Latgale | Aleksandrs Bartaševičs | LPV (KL) | KL | LPV | LPV | 3 November 2026 (Note: Aleksandrs Bartaševičs also served as an MP between 1993 and 2006.) | | 31 December 1965 | | |
| Latgale | Jekaterina Ivanova | LPV (KL) | KL | LPV | LPV | 3 November 2026 | | | | |
| Rīga | Andrejs Klementjevs | LPV (KL) | KL | LPV | LPV | 3 November 2026 (Note: Andrejs Klementjevs also served as an MP between 1998 and 2022.) | | 7 September 1973 | | |
| Zemgale | Aivars Kraps | LPV | LPV | LPV | LPV | 3 November 2026 | | | | |
| Vidzeme | Linda Liepiņa | LPV | LPV | LPV | LPV | 1 November 2022 (Note: Linda Liepiņa also served as an MP between 2018 and 2020.) | | 8 October 1974 | | |
| Rīga | Regīna Ločmele | LPV | LPV | LPV | LPV | 3 November 2026 (Note: Regīna Ločmele also served as an MP between 2014 and 2015, as well as 2018 and 2022.) | | 19 November 1966 | | |
| Latgale | Aleksejs Mackevičs | LPV (SL!) | SL! | LPV | LPV | 3 November 2026 | | 15 May 1982 | | |
| Latgale | Olga Petkeviča | LPV (DMP) | DMP | LPV | LPV | 3 November 2026 | | | | |
| Kurzeme | Ramona Petraviča | LPV | LPV | LPV | LPV | 8 June 2021 (Note: Ramona Petraviča also served as an MP between 2018 and 2019.) | | 25 September 1967 | | |
| Latgale | Viktorija Pleškāne | LPV | LPV | LPV | LPV | 1 November 2022 | | 3 May 1975 | | |
| Rīga | Jevgēnija Šafraneka | LPV | LPV | LPV | LPV | 3 November 2026 | | | | |
| Vidzeme | Dana Šlesere | LPV | LPV | LPV | LPV | 3 November 2026 | | | | |
| Rīga | Ainārs Šlesers | LPV | LPV | LPV | LPV | 3 November 2026 (Note: Ainārs Šlesers also served as an MP in 1998, between 1999 and 2002, in 2004, in 2006, in 2009, between 2010 and 2011, as well as 2022 and 2025.) | | 22 January 1970 | LPV list leader in the Rīga constituency. | |
| Zemgale | Edmunds Zivtiņš | LPV | LPV | LPV | LPV | 1 November 2022 | | 30 December 1969 | | |
| Vidzeme | Eduards Zivtiņš | LPV | LPV | LPV | LPV | 3 November 2026 | | | | |
| Rīga | Roberts Žemaitis | LPV | LPV | LPV | LPV | 3 November 2026 | | | | |
| Rīga | Natālija Ābola | SV/AJ (SV) | SV/AJ (SV) | SV/AJ | SV/AJ | 3 November 2026 | | 15 February 1953 | | |
| Rīga | Rūdolfs Brēmanis | SV/AJ (AJ) | SV/AJ (AJ) | SV/AJ | SV/AJ | 3 November 2026 | | 16 February 1983 | | |
| Kurzeme | Edgars Dārznieks | SV/AJ (AJ) | SV/AJ (AJ) | SV/AJ | SV/AJ | 3 November 2026 | | | | |
| Rīga | Inna Djeri | SV/AJ (SV) | SV/AJ (SV) | SV/AJ | SV/AJ | 3 November 2026 | | 29 December 1978 | | |
| Vidzeme | Aleksejs Ignatjevs | SV/AJ (SV) | SV/AJ (SV) | SV/AJ | SV/AJ | 3 November 2026 | | | | |
| Latgale | Andrejs Jakovļevs | SV/AJ (SV) | SV/AJ (SV) | SV/AJ | SV/AJ | 3 November 2026 | | | | |
| Rīga | Artūrs Klēbahs | SV/AJ (AJ) | SV/AJ (AJ) | SV/AJ | SV/AJ | 3 November 2026 | | | | |
| Latgale | Leontijs Morozs | SV/AJ (SV) | SV/AJ (SV) | SV/AJ | SV/AJ | 3 November 2026 | | | | |
| Zemgale | Andrejs Pagors | SV/AJ (LKS) | LKS | SV/AJ | SV/AJ | 3 November 2026 | | | | |
| Vidzeme | Gita Plaude | SV/AJ (AJ) | SV/AJ (AJ) | SV/AJ | SV/AJ | 3 November 2026 | | | | |
| Rīga | Jūlija Sohina | SV/AJ (LKS) | LKS | SV/AJ | SV/AJ | 3 November 2026 | | | | |
| Vidzeme | Karina Sprūde | SV/AJ (SV) | SV/AJ (SV) | SV/AJ | SV/AJ | 3 November 2026 (Note: Karina Sprūde also served as an MP between 2018 and 2022.) | | 30 May 1988 | | |
| Rīga | Jūlija Stepaņenko | SV/AJ (SV) | SV/AJ (SV) | SV/AJ | SV/AJ | 3 November 2026 (Note: Jūlija Stepaņenko also served as an MP between 2014 and 2022.) | | 1 September 1977 | | |
| Latgale | Vjačeslavs Stepaņenko | SV/AJ (SV) | SV/AJ (SV) | SV/AJ | SV/AJ | 3 November 2026 (Note: Vjačeslavs Stepaņenko also served as an MP between 2002 and 2008.) | | 8 August 1977 | | |
| Rīga | Ļubova Švecova | SV/AJ (SV) | SV/AJ (SV) | SV/AJ | SV/AJ | 3 November 2026 (Note: Ļubova Švecova also served as an MP between 2018 and 2022.) | | 25 September 1970 | | |
| Rīga | Ivars Āboliņš | NA | NA | NA | NA | 3 November 2026 | | 17 March 1980 | | |
| Kurzeme | Artūrs Butāns | NA | NA | NA | NA | 1 November 2022 | | 23 December 1992 | | |
| Vidzeme | Jānis Dombrava | NA | NA | NA | NA | 3 November 2026 (Note: Jānis Dombrava also served as an MP between 2010 and 2026.) | 20 November 2026 | 29 June 1988 | Temporarily resigned as an MP after being approved as minister of the interior on 17 November 2026. | |
| Vidzeme | Jānis Grasbergs | NA | NA | NA | NA | 20 November 2026 (Note: Jānis Grasbergs also served as an MP between 2022 and 2026.) | | 31 October 1986 | Temporarily assumed office as an MP after Jānis Dombrava was approved minister of the interior on 17 November 2026. | |
| Rīga | Ilze Indriksone | NA | NA | NA | NA | 3 November 2026 (Note: Ilze Indriksone also served as an MP between 2018 and 2022, in 2022, as well as between 2023 and 2026.) | 20 November 2026 | 29 October 1974 | Temporarily resigned as an MP after being approved as minister of welfare on 17 November 2026. | |
| Latgale | Rolands Keišs | NA | NA | NA | NA | 3 November 2026 | | | | |
| Rīga | Jurģis Klotiņš | NA | NA | NA | NA | 20 November 2026 (Note: Jurģis Klotiņš also served as an MP between 2022 and 2023, as well as between 2024 and 2026.) | | 17 October 1985 | Temporarily assumed office as an MP after Nauris Puntulis was approved as minister of culture on 17 November 2026. | |
| Rīga | Ģirts Lapiņš | NA | NA | NA | NA | 20 November 2026 (Note: Ģirts Lapiņš also served as an MP between 2022 and 2023.) | | 28 July 1976 | Temporarily assumed office as an MP after Ilze Indriksone was approved as minister of welfare on 17 November 2026. | |
| Vidzeme | Uģis Mitrevics | NA | NA | NA | NA | 1 November 2022 | | 27 November 1967 | | |
| Vidzeme | Ināra Mūrniece | NA | NA | NA | NA | 20 September 2023 (Note: Ināra Mūrniece also served as an MP between 2011 and 2022.) | | 30 December 1970 | | |
| Rīga | Nauris Puntulis | NA | NA | NA | NA | 20 September 2023 (Note: Nauris Puntulis also served as an MP in 2022.) | 20 November 2026 | 17 July 1961 | Temporarily resigned as an MP after being approved as minister of culture on 17 November 2026. | |
| Zemgale | Edvīns Šnore | NA | NA | NA | NA | 4 November 2014 | | 21 March 1974 | | |
| Zemgale | Jānis Vitenbergs | NA | NA | NA | NA | 3 November 2026 (Note: Jānis Vitenbergs also served as an MP between 2018 and 2020, in 2021, in 2022, as well as between 2023 and 2026.) | | 8 May 1985 | | |
| Rīga | Krista Burāne | PRO | PRO | PRO | PRO | 3 November 2026 | | 18 July 1971 | | |
| Rīga | Mārtiņš Hiršs | PRO | PRO | PRO | PRO | 3 November 2026 | | | | |
| Kurzeme | Agnese Lāce | PRO | PRO | PRO | PRO | 3 November 2026 | | 23 August 1987 | | |
| Rīga | Selma Levrence | PRO | PRO | PRO | PRO | 3 November 2026 (Note: Selma Levrence also served as an MP between 2025 and 2026.) | | 25 October 2000 | | |
| Rīga | Mairita Lūse | PRO | PRO | PRO | PRO | 3 November 2026 (Note: Mairita Lūse also served as an MP between 2023 and 2025.) | | 20 November 1986 | | |
| Rīga | Antoņina Ņenaševa | PRO | PRO | PRO | PRO | 1 November 2022 | | 17 July 1988 | | |
| Vidzeme | Jana Simanovska | PRO | PRO | PRO | PRO | 1 November 2022 | | 19 January 1971 | | |
| Vidzeme | Andris Sprūds | PRO | PRO | PRO | PRO | 14 May 2026 (Note: Andris Sprūds also served as an MP between 2022 and 2023.) | | 13 July 1971 | | |
| Rīga | Andris Šuvajevs | PRO | PRO | PRO | PRO | 1 November 2022 | | 18 June 1991 | | |
| Zemgale | Atis Švinka | PRO | PRO | PRO | PRO | 4 June 2026 (Note: Atis Švinka also served as an MP between 2022 and 2025.) | | 24 March 1973 | | |
| Kurzeme | Inga Bērziņa | JV (KN) | JV (KN) | JV | JV | 19 June 2025 (Note: Inga Bērziņa also served as an MP between 2022 and 2023.) | | 1 August 1963 | | |
| Rīga | Baiba Braže | JV (V) | JV (V) | JV | JV | 3 November 2026 | | 4 December 1966 | | |
| Rīga | Andrejs Judins | JV (V) | JV (V) | JV | JV | 17 October 2011 | | 21 February 1970 | | |
| Zemgale | Edmunds Jurēvics | JV (V) | JV (V) | JV | JV | 15 December 2022 | | 26 November 1992 | | |
| Vidzeme | Ainars Latkovskis | JV (V) | JV (V) | JV | JV | 11 May 2006 (Note: Ainars Latkovskis also served as an MP between 2002 and 2005.) | | 23 December 1967 | | |
| Rīga | Inese Lībiņa-Egnere | JV (V) | JV (V) | JV | JV | 11 June 2026 (Note: Inese Lībiņa-Egnere also served as an MP between 2011 and 2022.) | | 25 September 1977 | | |
| Vidzeme | Evika Siliņa | JV (V) | JV (V) | JV | JV | 11 June 2026 (Note: Evika Siliņa also served as an MP in 2022.) | | 3 August 1975 | | |
