= Artis Kampars =

Latvian politician and businessman

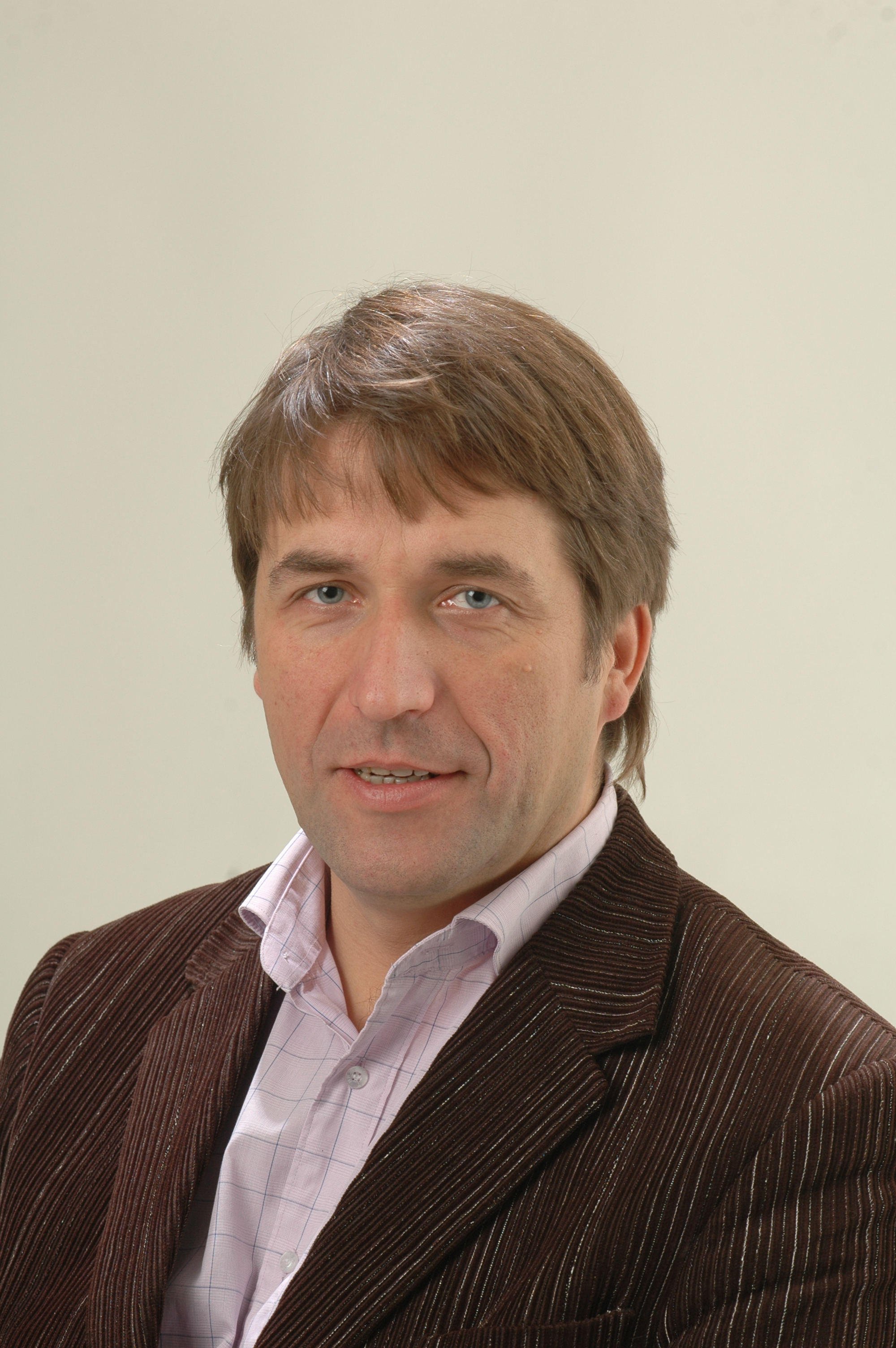

Minister for Economics of Latvia
- In office 12 March 2009 – 25 October 2011
- Prime Minister: Valdis Dombrovskis
- Preceded by: Kaspars Gerhards
- Succeeded by: Daniels Pavļuts

Personal details
- Born: 3 May 1967 (age 59) Tukums, Latvian SSR
- Party: Unity (2011—)
- Other political affiliations: New Era Party (2002-2011)
- Spouse: Ilva Kampere
- Education: Riga Technical University
- Profession: Businessman

Artis Kampars (born 3 May 1967) is a Latvian politician and businessman. He served as the Minister for Economics of Latvia. Kampars is a member of Unity.

Kampars became a member of eighth Saeima in 2002, was reelected four years later, but lost his mandate when he became a Minister in 2009. He served as the Minister for Economics of Latvia under the first two governments led by Prime Minister Valdis Dombrovskis.
