= Rozie =

Latvian mobile app for booking cleaning services

- Release: 1 October 2024; 23 months ago
- Operating system: Android, iOS
- Type: Online marketplace
- Website: rozie.app

Rozie is a Latvia-developed mobile application and online platform for booking cleaning services, operating primarily in Malta. The company behind the application was founded in 2023. Development began that year, and the service was launched in Malta on 1 October 2024. In 2025, Malta was its main market, while by the end of the year the company was preparing the product for the United States.

== Background ==
Rozie operates as an intermediary between customers and independent cleaners or cleaning companies. Customers submit service requests, providers send offers, and a service contract is formed when a customer accepts an offer. The platform facilitates booking, payment and customer support but does not itself provide the cleaning service.

Malta was selected as the first market because of its size, the widespread use of English, and lower implementation costs than in larger markets. The team planned to manage the platform and customer support from Latvia.

== History ==
Dainis Duļbinskis conceived the project and became a co-founder and co-owner. The early team also included Aleksandrs Tuļs and Edgars Veigurs. Duļbinskis was chief executive, Tuļs was responsible for finance and strategic development, and Veigurs was technical director.

== Operations in Malta ==
Customers post requests, service providers submit offers, and both sides can rate one another after a completed booking.

By May 2025, Rozie had more than 10,000 registered accounts. In August 2026, the platform's website stated that it had more than 28,000 users and 8,511 completed cleanings.

== Development and marketing ==
When Rozie launched in October 2024, its initial advertising used Google Ads linking to the App Store, Google Play and a landing page. The company later worked with 18 Instagram creators and advertised on 250,000 milk cartons in Malta. A MarketingSherpa case study reported that monthly installations increased from about 3,600 in October-December 2024 to about 6,500 in April-May 2025.

== Support and expansion plans ==
Rozie received support from the Investment and Development Agency of Latvia for development of its website.

By December 2025, Rozie App, Inc. had been registered in Delaware, and the company was preparing the product for the United States market. Its initial plans covered Florida, including Tampa and Miami, followed by Texas.

== Trademarks ==
In 2025, the Patent Office of the Republic of Latvia selected ROZIE as one of the first-quarter candidates for the Trademark of the Year 2025 award, in the word-mark category of the Trademark of the Year for the European Union nomination. The ROZIE European Union trademark, number 019116762, is registered to ROZIE APP, LLC.

The United States trademark application for ROZIE has USPTO serial number 99429982. The application was published in the USPTO Trademark Official Gazette on 5 May 2026.

== Availability ==
Rozie is available on Google Play and Apple's App Store.
