= Zemgale (disambiguation) =

Zemgale is the Latvian name for Semigallia, a historical and cultural region of Latvia.

Zemgale may also refer to:

- Zemgale Planning Region, a planning and statistical region of Latvia
- Zemgale Province, a province in Republic of Latvia (1918–1940)
- Zemgale Suburb, Riga, an administrative district of Riga, Latvia
- Semigallia (Saeima constituency), constituency of the Saeima, the national legislature of Latvia, known as Zemgale in Latvian
- Duchy of Courland and Semigallia, 1561–1795
- Duchy of Courland and Semigallia (1918), a short-lived client state of the German Empire
