= Viktors Valainis =

Latvian politician (born 1986)

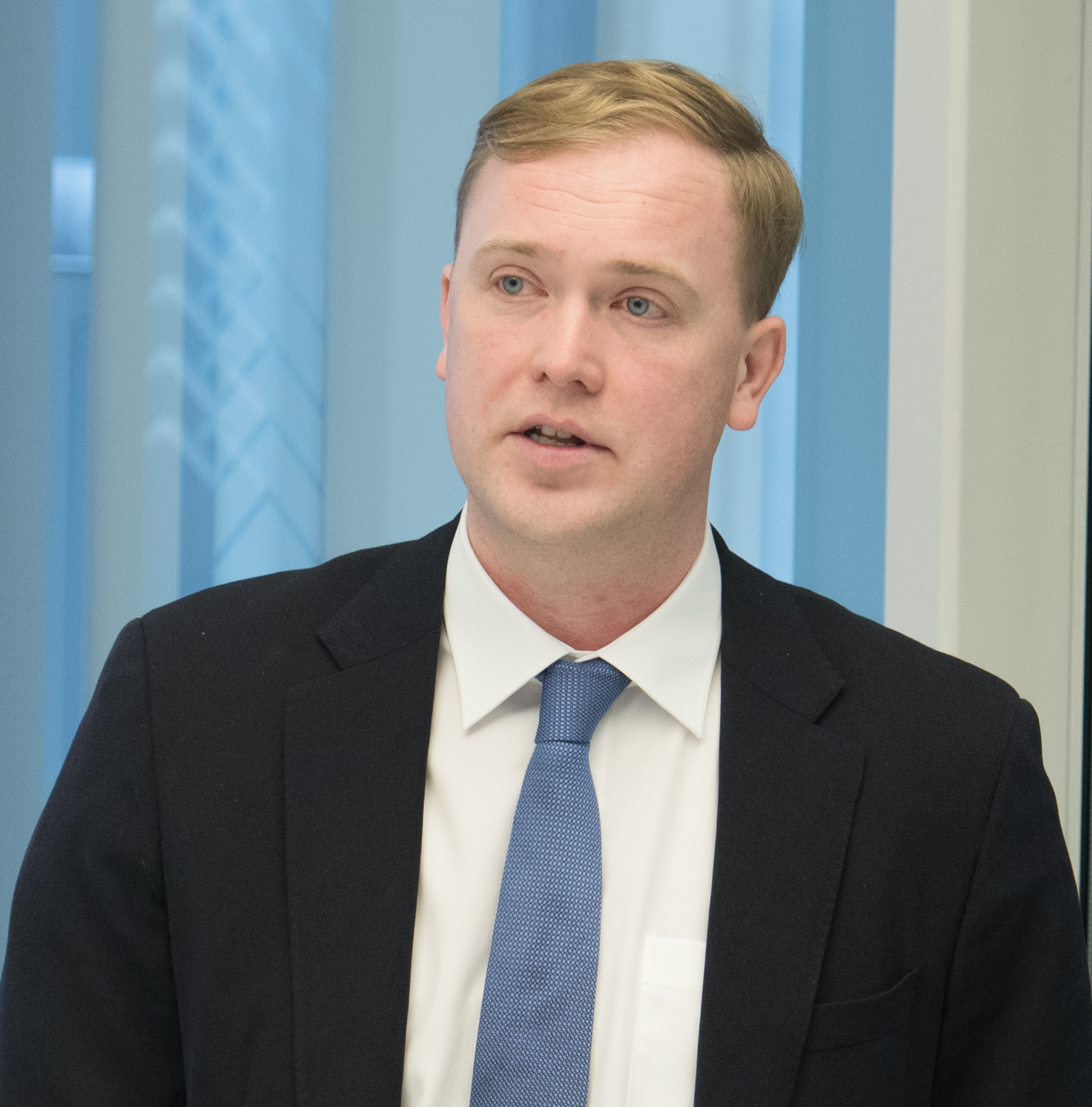
- Valainis in 2019

Minister of Economics
- In office 15 September 2023 – 17 November 2026
- Prime Minister: Evika Siliņa; Andris Kulbergs
- Preceded by: Ilze Indriksone
- Succeeded by: Edgars Štelmahers

Member of the Saeima
- In office 17 October 2011 – 15 September 2023
- Constituency: Semigallia

Personal details
- Born: 9 August 1986 (age 40) Jelgava, Latvian SSR, Soviet Union
- Party: LZS (since 2018)
- Other political affiliations: ZRP (2011); Independent (2011–2014); Unity (2014–2018)
- Education: Riga Technical University

Viktors Valainis (born 9 August 1986) is a Latvian politician of the Latvian Farmers' Union serving as Minister of Economics since 2023. From 2011 to 2023, he was a member of the Saeima.
