= Atis Švinka =

Latvian politician (born 1973)

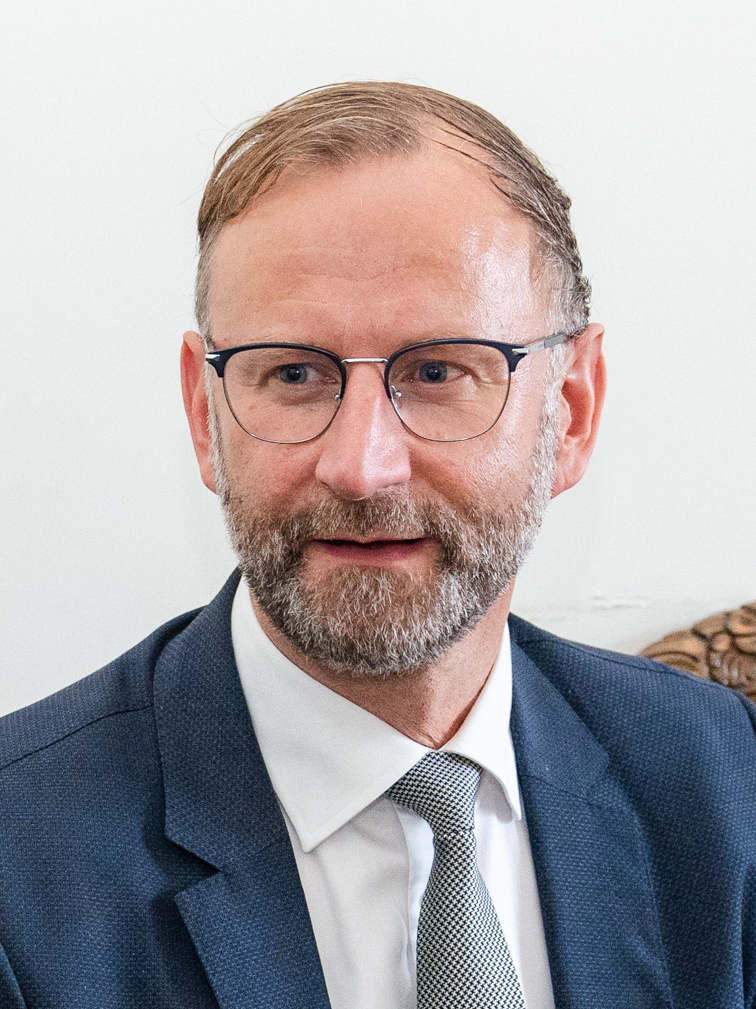
- Švinka in 2024

Minister of Transport
- In office 6 March 2025 – 28 May 2026
- Prime Minister: Evika Siliņa
- Preceded by: Kaspars Briškens
- Succeeded by: Rihards Kozlovskis

Member of the Saeima
- In office 1 November 2022 – 13 March 2025
- Constituency: Semigallia

Personal details
- Born: 24 March 1973 (age 53)
- Party: The Progressives

Atis Švinka (born 24 March 1973) is a Latvian politician who as Minister of Transport from 2025 until 2026. From 2022 to 2025, he was a member of the Saeima.
