= Jevgenija Stalidzāne =

Latvian politician

Jevgenija Stalidzāne (December 17, 1944 – October 21, 2015) was a Latvian politician and a deputy of the 7th and 8th Saeima (the Latvian parliament). She was a member of the New Party, and later, the Latvian First Party.

In 1968, she graduated from the Riga Polytechnic Institute, specializing in the automation of heat and electric energy processes. Before starting her political career, she was active in trade unions, having been the long-standing chairperson of the "Energy" trade union.

Political activity In 1998, J. Stalidzāne was elected to the 7th Saeima from the list of the New Party, from May to August 2000 she was the leader of the party's Saeima faction. In December 2000, she left the New Party. In 2002, J. Stalidzāne was among the founders of the Latvian First Party, and in the autumn from its list was elected to the 8th Saeima. She served in the Saeima until 2006.

Afterwards, she also ran in the 9th, 10th, and 11th Saeima elections from political forces that were associated with Ainārs Šlesers ("For a Good Latvia", Šlesers Reform Party LPP/LC, "United for Latvia"), but she was never elected to the Saeima.

Jevgenija Stalidzāne died on October 21, 2015. She was buried on October 24 in the Zander cemetery in Jelgava.
