= Vitālijs Orlovs =

Latvian politician

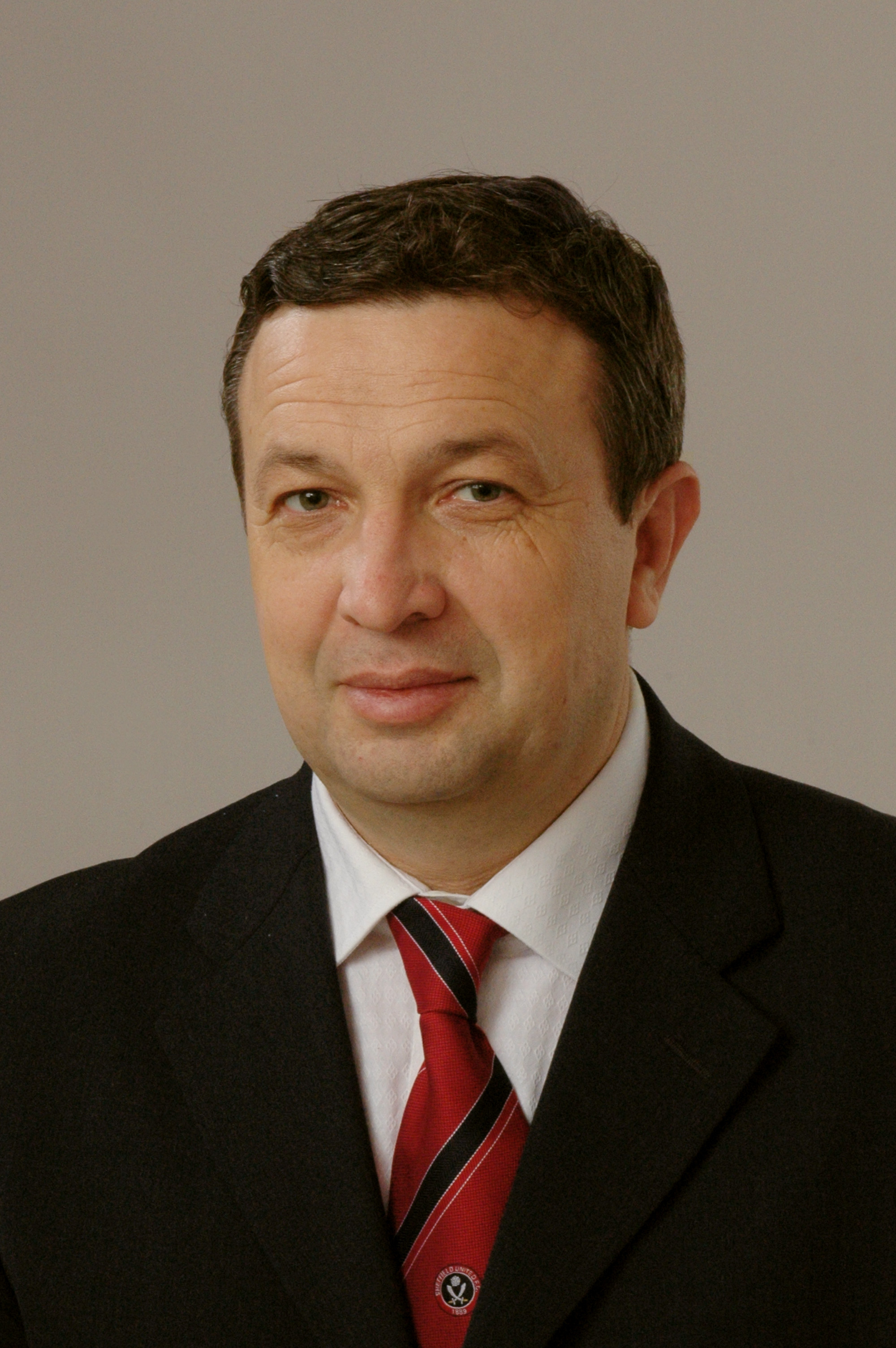

Deputy of the Saeima
- Incumbent
- Assumed office 2006

Personal details
- Born: 30 May 1964 (age 61) Jēkabpils, Latvian SSR
- Party: Harmony
- Profession: Doctor

Vitālijs Orlovs (born 1964) is a Latvian politician. He is a member of Harmony and a deputy of the 8th, 9th, 10th, 11th and 12th Saeima. He began his current term in parliament on 4 November 2014. He is of partial Karelian descent.
