= List of deputy speakers of the Saeima =

This is a list of the deputy speakers of the Saeima, the parliament of Latvia. Currently, two deputy speakers of the Saeima (Latvian: Saeimas priekšsēdētāja biedri) are elected per convocation.

== List ==
Saeima	Name	Party	Term
Supreme Council	Dainis Īvāns (first deputy speaker)	LTF	May 3, 1990 – February 18, 1992
Supreme Council	Valdis Birkavs	LTF	February 18, 1992 – July 6, 1993
Supreme Council	Andrejs Krastiņš	LTF	May 3, 1990 – July 6, 1993
5th Saeima	Aivars Berķis	LZS	July 6, 1993 – November 6, 1995
5th Saeima	Andrejs Krastiņš	TB/LNNK	July 6, 1993 – November 6, 1995
6th Saeima	Andris Ameriks	TSP (to 1996), DPS (from 1996)	November 7, 1995 – November 1, 1998
6th Saeima	Alfreds Čepānis	DCP (to 1995), DPS (from 1995)	November 7, 1995 – September 26, 1996
6th Saeima	Aigars Jirgens	TB/LNNK	September 26, 1996 – April 23, 1998
6th Saeima	Jānis Straume	TB/LNNK	May 21, 1998 – November 1, 1998
7th Saeima	Indulis Bērziņš	LC	November 2, 1998 – July 16, 1999
7th Saeima	Gundars Bojārs	LSDSP	November 2, 1998 – March 26, 2001
7th Saeima	Rihards Pīks	TP	July 16, 1999 – November 4, 2002
7th Saeima	Romualds Ražuks	LC	April 5, 2001 – November 4, 2002
8th Saeima	Ēriks Jēkabsons	LPP	November 5, 2002 – March 18, 2004
8th Saeima	Karina Pētersone	LC	March 18, 2004 – February 17, 2005
8th Saeima	Vineta Muižniece	TP	February 24, 2005 – November 6, 2006
9th Saeima	Vineta Muižniece	TP	November 7, 2006 – September 3, 2009
9th Saeima	Karina Pētersone	LC (to 2007), LPP/LC (from 2007)	November 7, 2006 – March 19, 2009, April 15, 2010 – November 1, 2010
9th Saeima	Solvita Āboltiņa	JL	March 19, 2009 – November 1, 2010
10th Saeima	Gundars Daudze	ZZS	November 2, 2010 – July 21, 2011
10th Saeima	Andrejs Klementjevs	Harmony Centre	November 2, 2010 – October 16, 2011
10th Saeima	Jānis Vucāns	ZZS	July 21, 2011 – October 16, 2011
11th Saeima	Andrejs Klementjevs	Harmony Centre	October 17, 2011 – November 3, 2014
11th Saeima	Inga Bite	ZRP	October 17, 2011 – June 14, 2012
11th Saeima	Inese Lībiņa-Egnere	ZRP	June 14, 2012 – November 3, 2014
12th Saeima	Inese Lībiņa-Egnere	Unity	November 4, 2014 – November 6, 2018
12th Saeima	Gundars Daudze	ZZS	November 4, 2014 – November 6, 2018
13th Saeima	Inese Lībiņa-Egnere	Unity	November 6, 2018 – November 1, 2022
13th Saeima	Dagmāra Beitnere-Le Galla	JKP	November 6, 2018 – November 1, 2022
14th Saeima	Zanda Kalniņa-Lukaševica	Unity	November 1, 2022 – present
14th Saeima	Jānis Grasbergs	NA	November 1, 2022 – September 20, 2023
14th Saeima	Antoņina Ņenaševa	PRO	September 20, 2023 – present

== Sources ==
- Official website
