= Tukums county =

16th–20th century county in Latvia

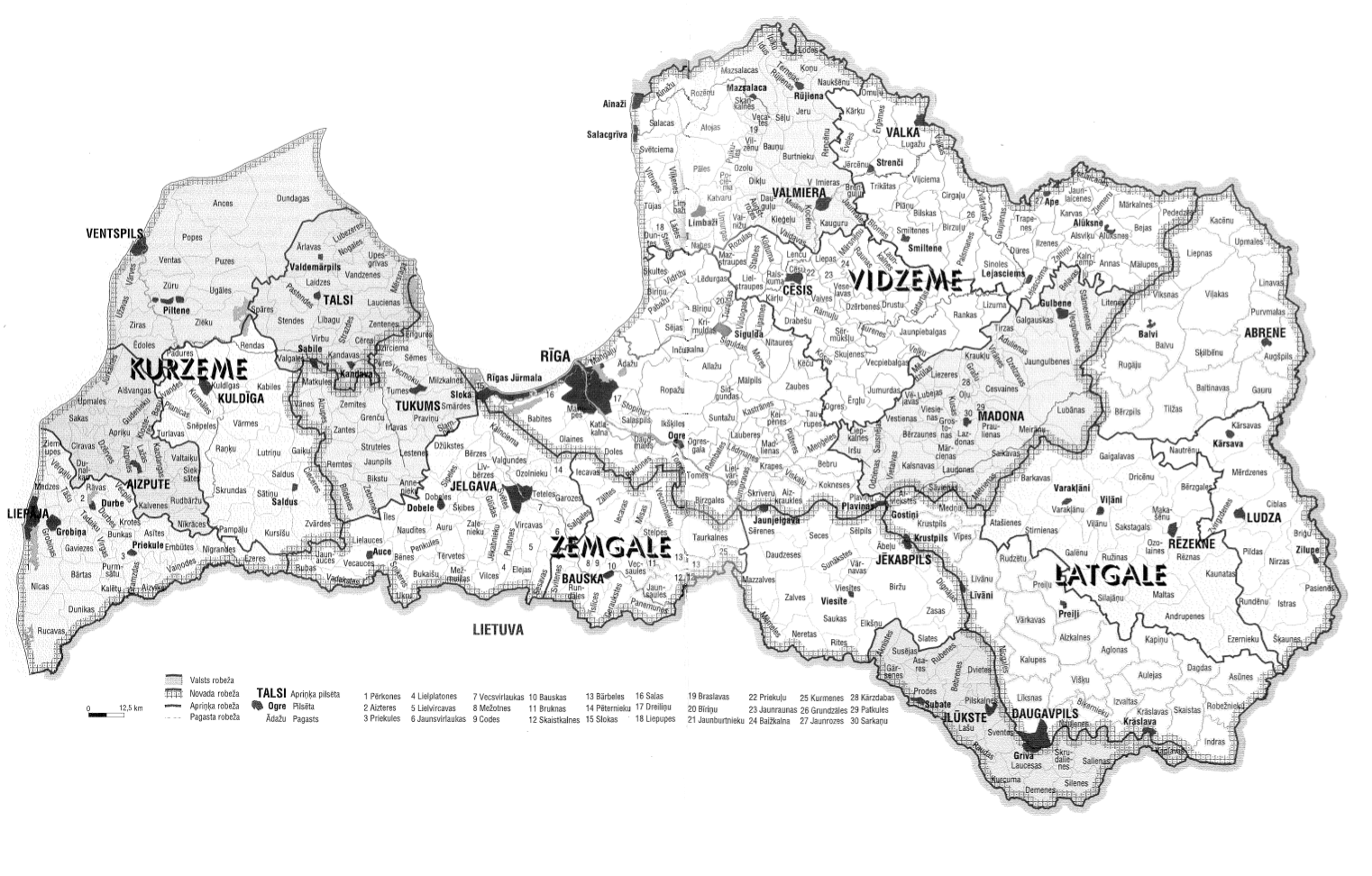
Tukuma apriņķis on the map of Latvia (1938).

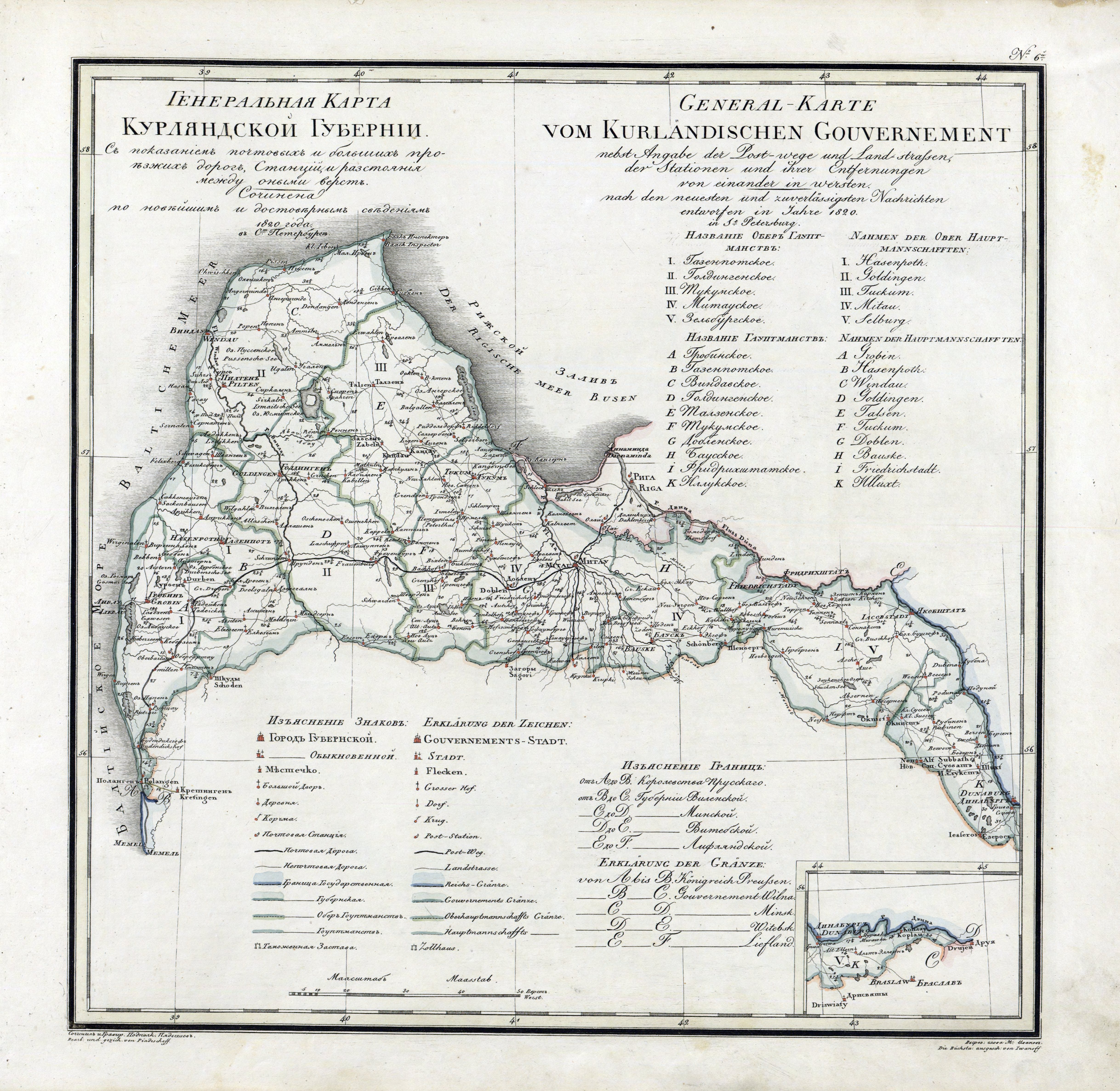
Tuckum County on the map of Courland Governorate (1820).

Tukums county (Latvian: Tukuma apriņķis, German: Kreis Tuckum, Russian: Туккумский уезд) was a historic county of the Courland Governorate and of the Republic of Latvia. Its capital was Tukums (Tuckum).

== History ==
The Captaincy of Tukums (German: Hauptmannschaft Tuckum) was founded in 1617 as a subdivision of the Duchy of Courland and Semigallia. In 1795, the Duchy was incorporated into the Russian Empire, and in 1819 Tuckum County (Kreis Tuckum) became one of the ten counties of the Courland Governorate.

After establishment of the Republic of Latvia in 1918, the Tukuma apriņķis existed until 1949, when the Council of Ministers of the Latvian SSR split it into the newly created districts (rajons) of Tukums, Dobele, Saldus and Kandava (dissolved in 1959).

== Demographics ==
At the time of the Russian Empire Census of 1897, Kreis Tuckum had a population of 51,076. Of these, 89.0% spoke Latvian, 5.3% Yiddish, 4.3% German, 0.5% Lithuanian, 0.4% Russian, 0.2% Romani and 0.2% Polish as their native language.
