= Bauska county =

16th–20th century county in Latvia

The county within Latvia in 1940

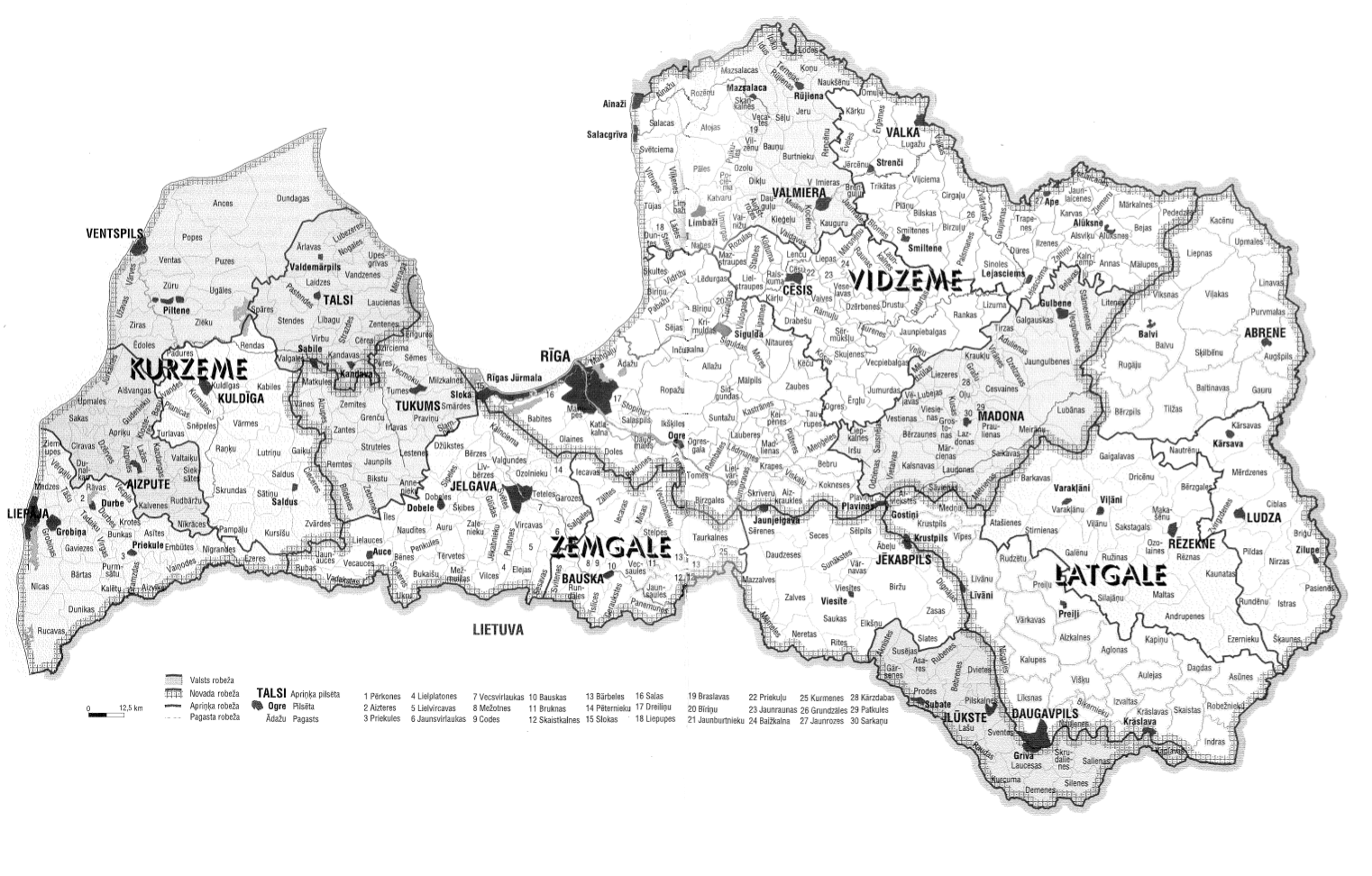
Bauskas apriņķis on the map of Latvia (1938).

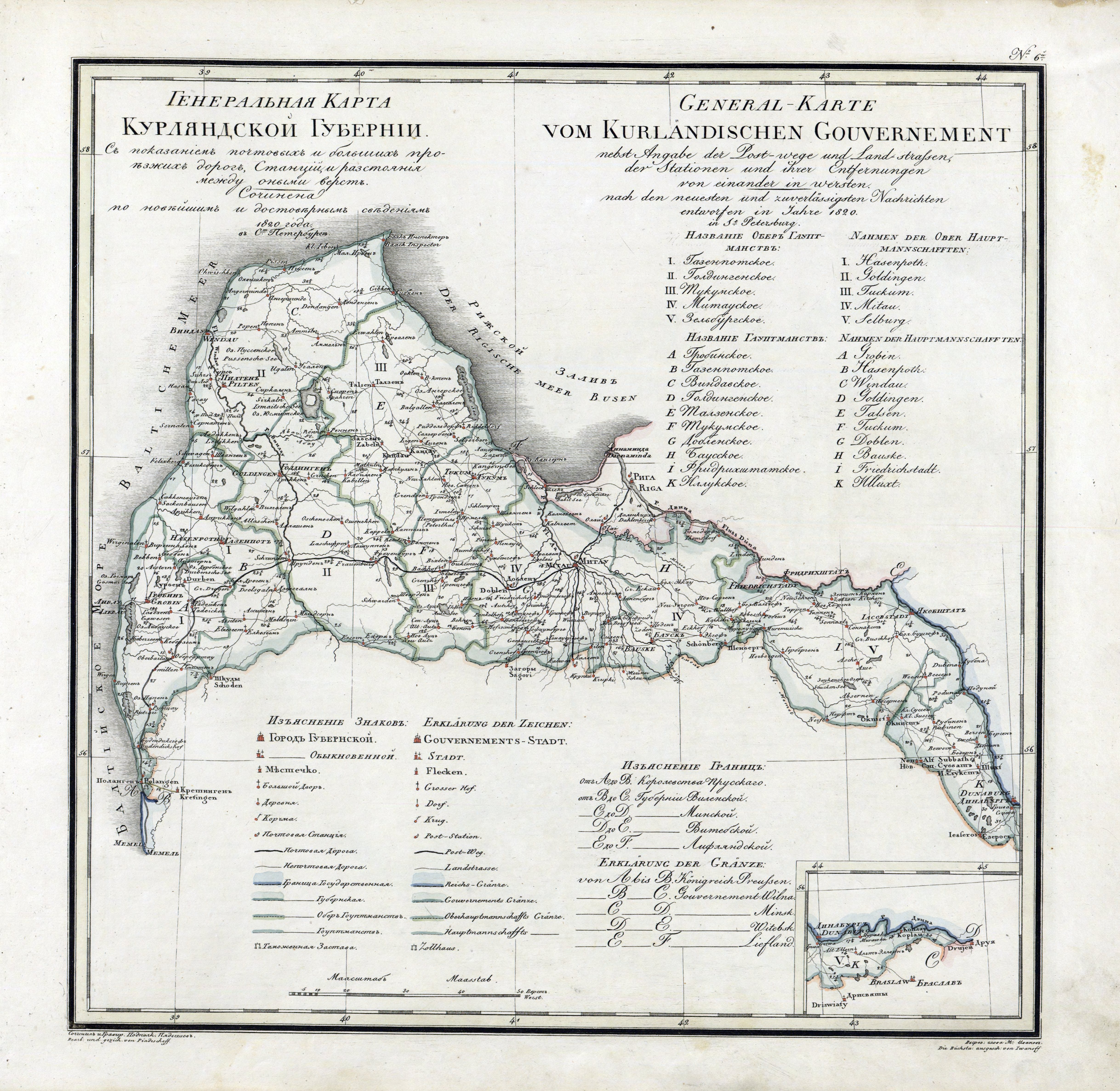
Bauske County on the map of Courland Governorate (1820).

Bauska county (Latvian: Bauskas apriņķis, German: Kreis Bauske, Russian: Бауский уезд) was a historic county of the Courland Governorate and of the Republic of Latvia. Its capital was Bauska (Bauske).

== History ==
The Captaincy of Bauske (German: Hauptmannschaft Bauske) was founded in 1617 as a subdivision of the Duchy of Courland and Semigallia. In 1795, the Duchy was incorporated into the Russian Empire, and in 1819 Bauske County (Kreis Bauske) became one of the ten counties of the Courland Governorate.

After establishment of the Republic of Latvia in 1918, the Bauskas apriņķis existed until 1949, when the Council of Ministers of the Latvian SSR split it into the newly created districts (rajons) of Bauska and Baldone (dissolved in 1959).

== Demographics ==
At the time of the Russian Empire Census of 1897, Kreis Bauske had a population of 50,547. Of these, 87.4% spoke Latvian, 6.0% German, 4.3% Yiddish, 1.1% Lithuanian, 0.5% Russian, 0.4% Romani and 0.2% Polish as their native language.
