= Investment and Development Agency of Latvia =

Investment promotion agency

- Latvijas Investīciju un attīstības aģentūra
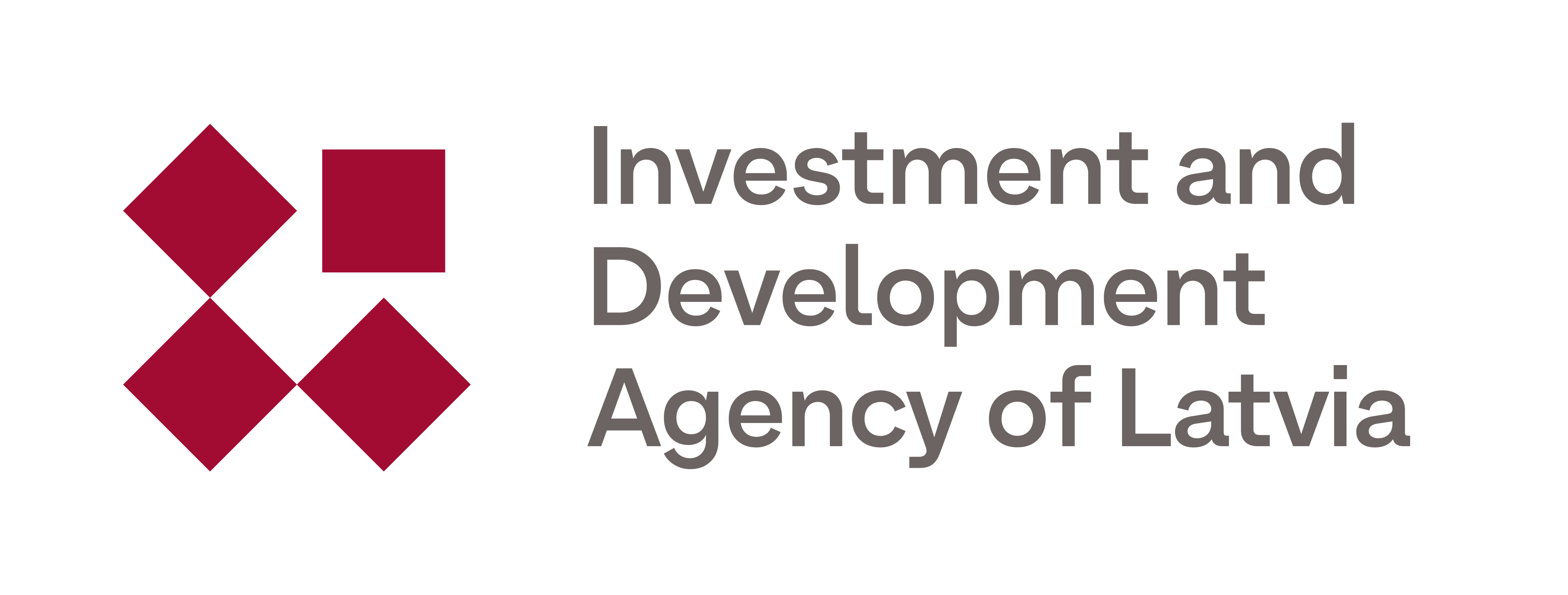

Agency overview
- Formed: September 1993
- Headquarters: Pērses iela 2, Riga
- Employees: 270
- Parent agency: Ministry of Economics (Latvia)
- Website: www.liaa.gov.lv/eng/home/news

The Investment and Development Agency of Latvia (LIAA) is Latvia's investment promotion agency."Investment and Development Agency of Latvia and Rail Baltica discuss attraction of private investments to the Rail Baltica Project". The Baltic Times. 30 July 2024. It is a direct administration institution subordinated to the Minister of Economics of Latvia. Established in 1993 as the Latvian Development Agency, it was reorganized into the Investment and Development Agency of Latvia in 2003.

== Foreign trade ==
LIAA organizes business trips to foreign countries, which include business forums, workshops, entrepreneur roundtable discussions, contact exchanges, trade fairs, and individual meetings with potential business partners.

LIAA organizes export seminars that deal with exports and provide information on news and trends in foreign markets, as well as the European Single Market.

== Tourism ==
In 2016, the Tourism Development State Agency (TAVA) was added to LIAA. The aim of the department is to promote Latvian tourism products and services.

== Business incubators ==
In October 2016, 11 business incubators and 9 support units were active in Latvia (Bauska, Daugavpils, Jelgava, Jēkabpils, Jūrmala, Kuldīga, Liepāja, Madona, Ogre, Rēzekne, Sigulda, Talsi, Valmiera, Ventspils, and a creative industries incubator in Riga).

In 2024, the LIAA was forced to stop providing funding to startups, due to the Economic Ministry's failure to introduce legal amendments required by the updated EU "de minimis" regulation.
