= Ilūkste county =

19th–20th century county in Latvia

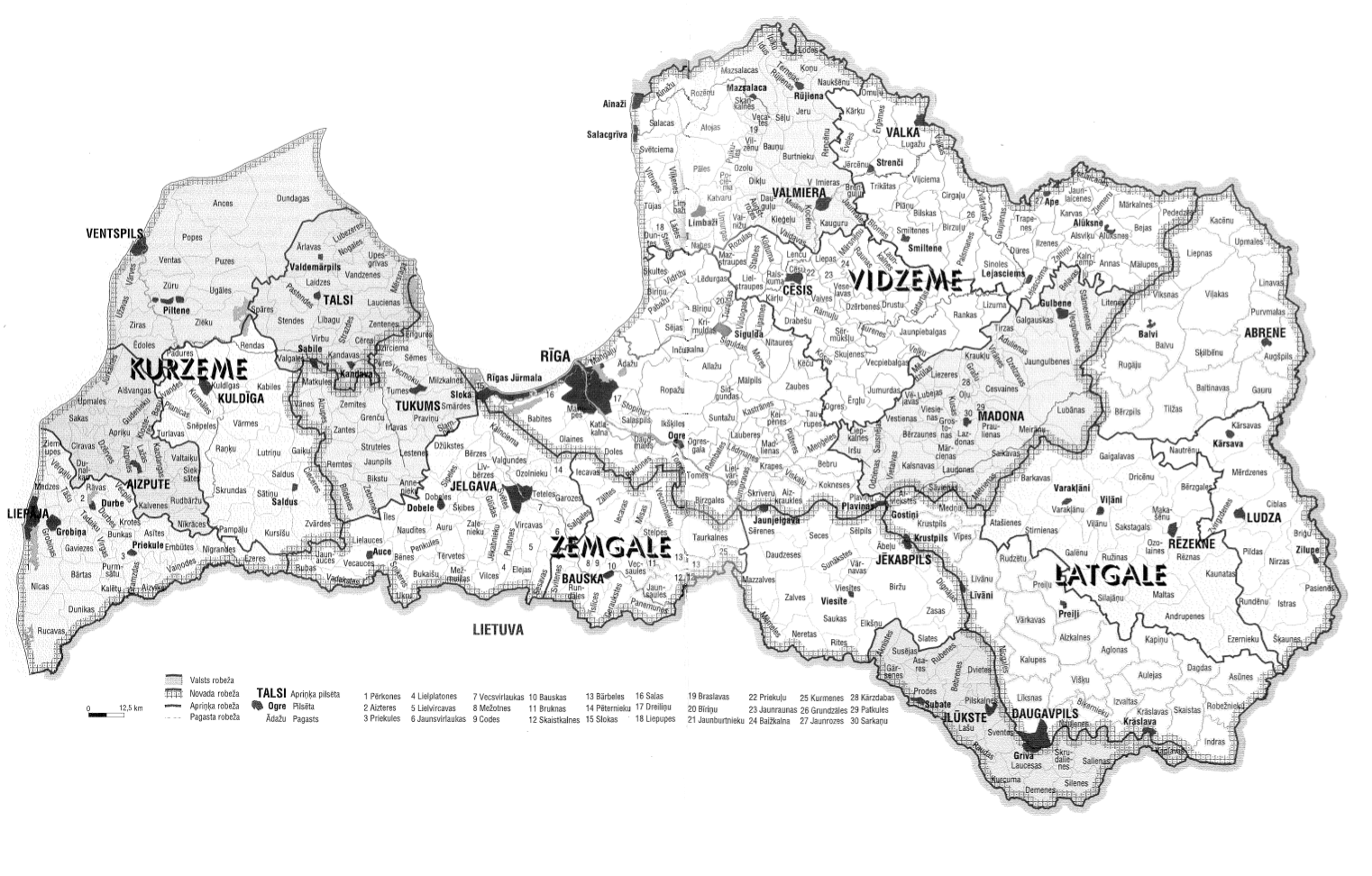
Ilūkstes apriņķis on the map of Latvia (1938).

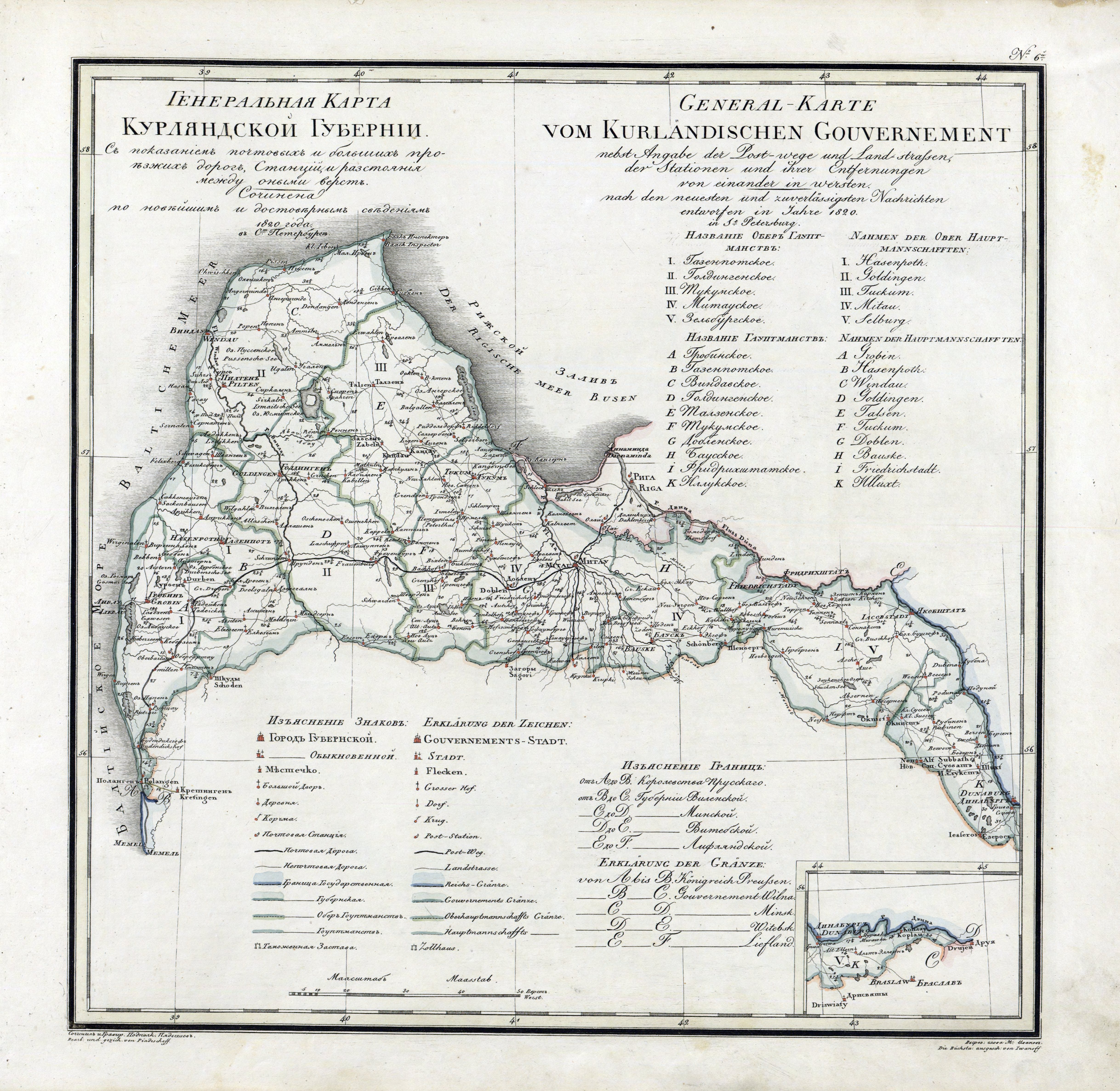
Illuxt County on the map of Courland Governorate (1820).

Ilūkste county (Latvian: Ilūkstes apriņķis, German: Kreis Illuxt, Russian: Иллукстский уезд) was a historic county of the Courland Governorate and of the Republic of Latvia. Its capital was Ilūkste (Illuxt), but the most populous settlement was Grīva (Griwa-Semgallen) immediately south of Daugavpils (Dünaburg).

== History ==
Initially, the Captaincy of Illuxt (German: Hauptmannschaft Illuxt) was as a subdivision of the Duchy of Courland and Semigallia. In 1795, the Duchy was incorporated into the Russian Empire, and in 1819 Illuxt County (Kreis Illuxt) became one of the ten counties of the Courland Governorate. It was forming a wedge between Vilna (later Kovno) and Vitebsk governorates.

After the establishment of the Republic of Latvia in 1918, the Ilūkstes apriņķis existed until 1949, when the Council of Ministers of the Latvian SSR split it into the newly created districts (rajons) of Grīva (dissolved in 1955), Aknīste (dissolved in 1956) and Ilūkste (dissolved in 1962 and merged with the Daugavpils district).

== Demographics ==
At the time of the Russian Empire Census of 1897, Kreis Illuxt had a population of 66,461. Of these, 28.5% spoke Latvian, 17.3% Belarusian, 17.1% Polish, 15.2% Russian, 10.5% Lithuanian and 9.6% Yiddish as their native language.
