= Ministry of Economics (Latvia) =

Government ministry of Latvia

Republic of Latvia Ministry of Economics
- Latvijas Republikas Ekonomikas ministrija
- Coat of arms of Latvia

Agency overview
- Jurisdiction: Government of Latvia
- Headquarters: Brīvības iela 55, Riga; 56.9575°N 24.1233°E
- Agency executive: Viktors Valainis, Minister of Economics
- Child agency: Investment and Development Agency of Latvia
- Website: em.gov.lv

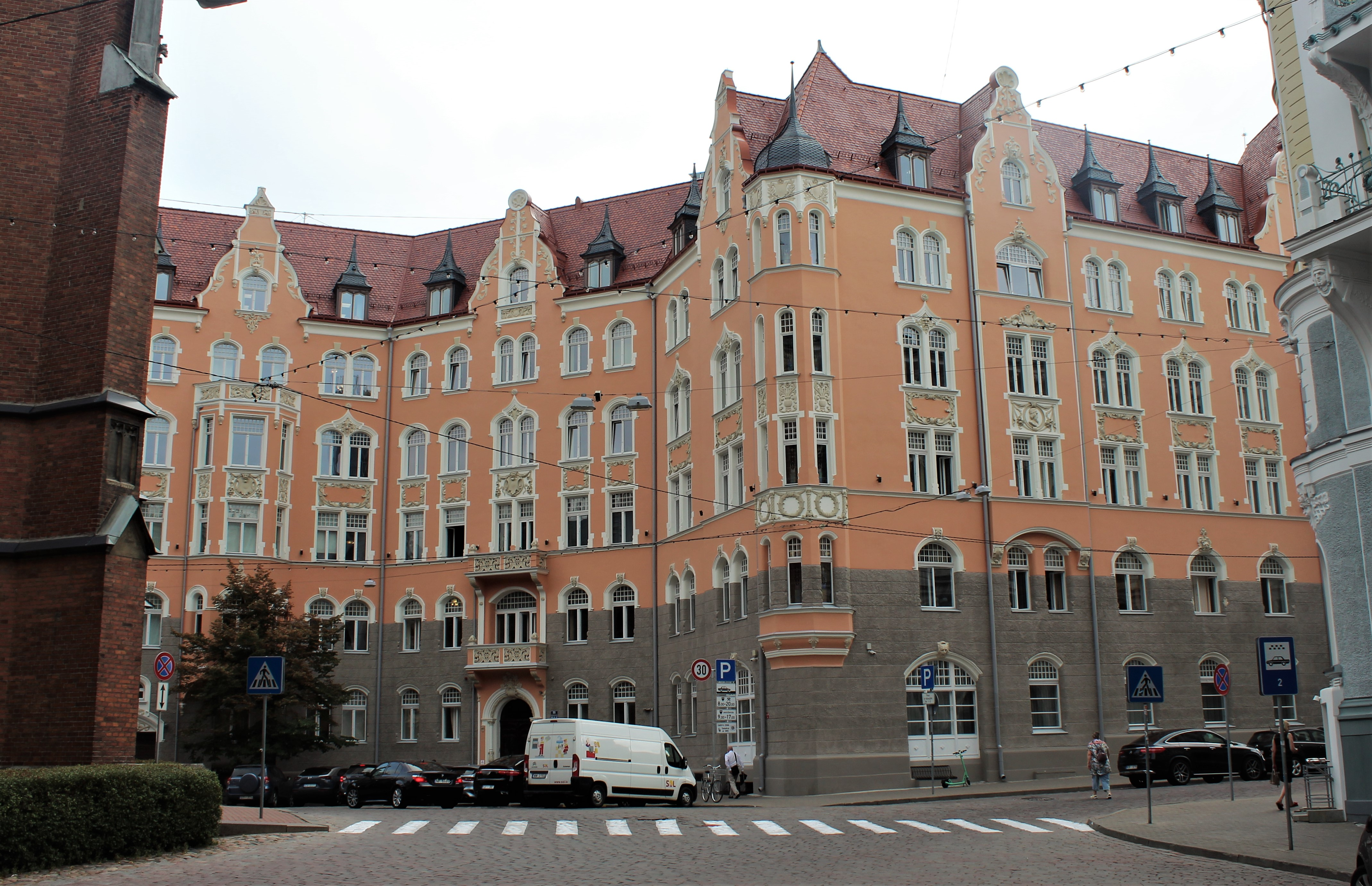
Building of Ministry

The Ministry of Economics of the Republic of Latvia (Latvian: Latvijas Republikas Ekonomikas ministrija) is the leading state administrative institution responsible for economic policy in Latvia. The ministry also represents the economic interests of Latvia in the European Union.

== Minister for Economics ==
The current minister since September 15, 2023, is Viktors Valainis from the Union of Greens and Farmers political alliance.

== Functions ==
The ministry develops, organises and coordinates policy in areas including external economic policy, construction, the internal market, innovation development, business development, competitiveness, housing, consumer protection, privatisation, industrial policy, standardisation, structural economic policy and tourism. It works closely with non-governmental organizations representing entrepreneurs and other social partners.

== EU Structural Funds ==
The Ministry of Economics acts as a responsible authority for Cohesion Policy funds, also referred to as EU funds, within its policy areas. The ministry designs support programmes aimed at enterprise development, competitiveness, innovation and export capacity, addressing financial and advisory needs of enterprises at different stages of development.

== Subordinated institutions ==
The Ministry of Economics oversees several government agencies in Latvia: the Investment and Development Agency of Latvia, Latvian Tourism Development Agency, the Central Statistical Bureau of Latvia, Competition Council, Consumer Rights Protection Center, and Public Utilities Commission.

== See also ==
- Economy of Latvia
