= Tukums district =

District of Latvia

Coordinates: 56°58′N 23°09′E

Tukums
- District
- Coat of arms

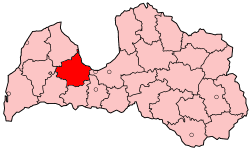
- Country: Latvia

Area
  - Total: 2,450 km^{2} (950 sq mi)

Population
  - Total: 53,734
  - Density: 21.9/km^{2} (56.8/sq mi)

Tukums district (Latvian: Tukuma rajons) was an administrative division of Latvia, located in Courland region, in the country's west.

Districts were eliminated during the administrative-territorial reform in 2009.
