= Saeima =

Parliament of Latvia

Coordinates: 56°57′04″N 24°06′18″E

- 15th Saeima

Type
- Type: Unicameral

History
- Founded: 7 November 1922; 104 years ago 6 July 1993; 33 years ago
- Disbanded: 1934–1940; 1940–1991
- Preceded by: Constitutional Assembly of Latvia

Leadership
- Speaker: Edvards Smiltēns, United List since 3 November 2026

Structure
- Seats: 100
- Political groups: Government (Second Kulbergs cabinet) (51): AS (41) (Note: LRA (18); LZP (13); Independent (Latvijas Restarts) (6); LP (3); I (1)); NA (10); Opposition (49): LPV (17) (Note: LPV (12); KL (3); DMP (1); SL! (1)); SV/AJ (15) (Note: SV (9); AJ (4); LKS (2)); PRO (10); JV (7)
- Committees: 16: Foreign Affairs; Budget and Finance (Taxation); Legal Affairs; Human Rights and Public Affairs; Education, Culture and Science; Defence, Internal Affairs and Corruption Prevention; Public Administration and Local Government; Economic, Agricultural, Environmental and Regional Policy; Social and Employment Matters; Mandate, Ethics and Submissions; Parliamentary Inquiry; Public Expenditure and Audit; National Security; Citizenship, Migration and Social Cohesion; European Affairs; Sustainable Development
- Length of term: 4 years

Elections
- Voting system: Open list proportional representation with a 5% electoral threshold
- First election: 7–8 October 1922 5–6 June 1993
- Last election: 3 October 2026

Meeting place
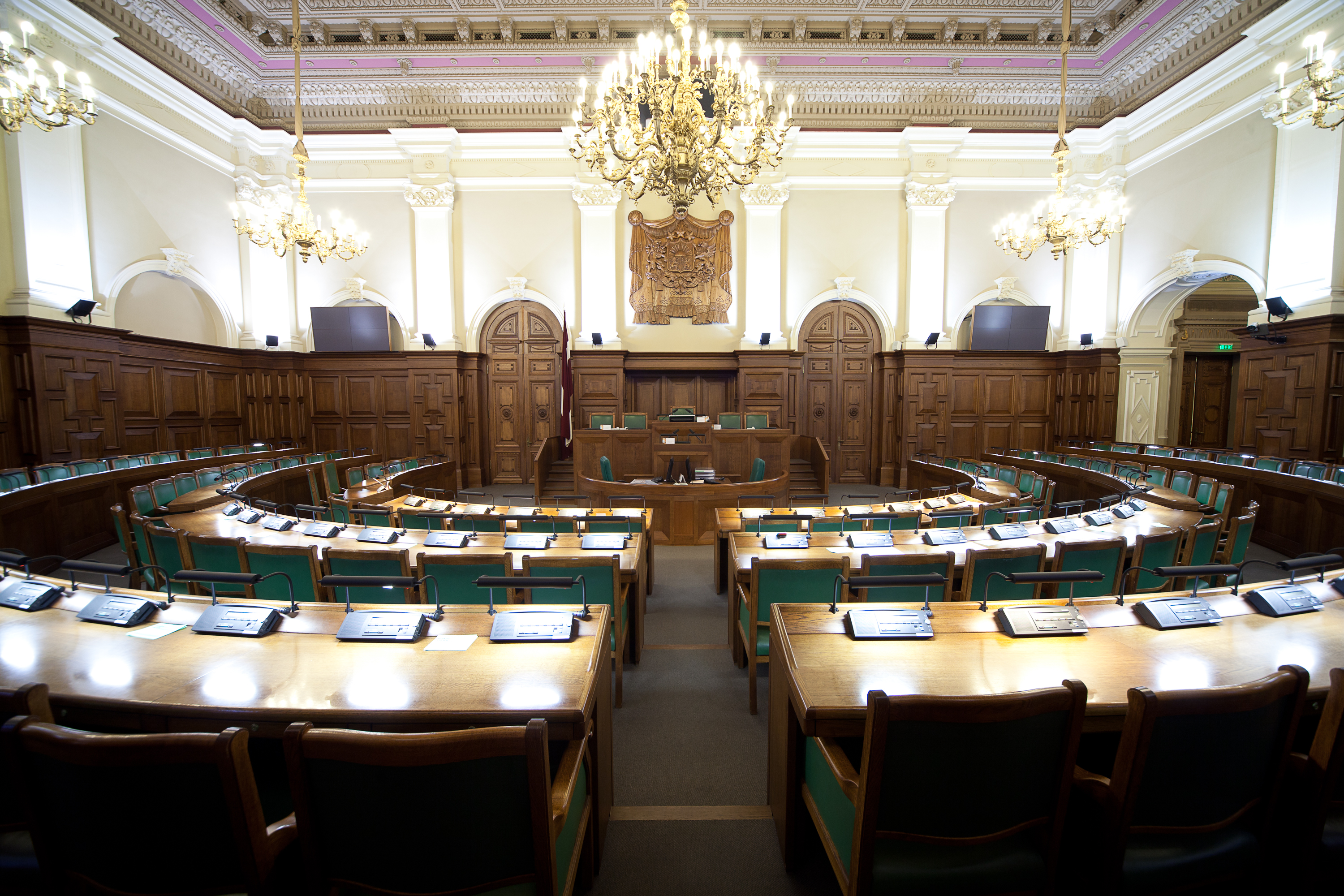
- House of the Livonian Noble Corporation, Riga

Website
- www.saeima.lv

The Saeima (Latvian pronunciation: [ˈsai.ma]) is the parliament of the Republic of Latvia. It is a unicameral parliament consisting of 100 members who are elected by proportional representation, with seats allocated to political parties which gain at least 5% of the popular vote. Elections are scheduled to be held once every four years, normally on the first Saturday of October. The most recent elections were held in October 2026.

The President of Latvia can dismiss the Saeima and request early elections. The procedure for dismissing it involves substantial political risk to the president, including a risk of loss of office. On 28 May 2011 president Valdis Zatlers decided to initiate the dissolution of the Saeima, which was approved in a referendum, and the Saeima was dissolved on 23 July 2011.

The current Speaker of the Saeima is Edvards Smiltēns of the United List. The basic document that regulates the proceedings of the parliament is the Rules of Order of Saeima (Saeimas kārtības rullis, also Rules of Procedure), adopted 23 March 1923 with amendments in 1929 and 1994.

== History and etymology ==
The Saeima traces its origins to the Sejm of the Kingdom of Poland, which led to the creation of the Sejm (Seimas) of the Grand Duchy of Lithuania and later to the creation of the Sejm of the Polish–Lithuanian Commonwealth. Polish Livonia, a part of the Polish–Lithuanian Commonwealth, was exposed to the Polish mode of administration and introduced to the Sejm-system. The Warsaw Sejm of 1677 settled the case of remaining part of Polish Livonia or Latgale (Polish: Inflanty), naming it a voivodeship and a duchy, with the right to name three senators: the Bishop, the Voivode and the Castellan of Inflanty (...) Local sejmiks took place at Daugavpils, while starostas resided at Daugavpils, Ludza, Rēzekne and Viļaka. The voivodeship had six deputies to the Sejm, but only two of them came from Inflanty, the other four were symbolically named by the king, to remember the lost part of Livonia (Swedish Livonia). However, the rest of Latvia belonged to the Duchy of Courland and Semigallia, which was governed by the Dukes and the Landtag of Courland.

The word sejm derives from the verb "sjąć się" meaning "to get together", with similar words in some other Slavic languages, of proto-Slavic origin *sъjęti < *sъjemti Sejm, then, as a noun meant "a gathering, a meeting, a council."

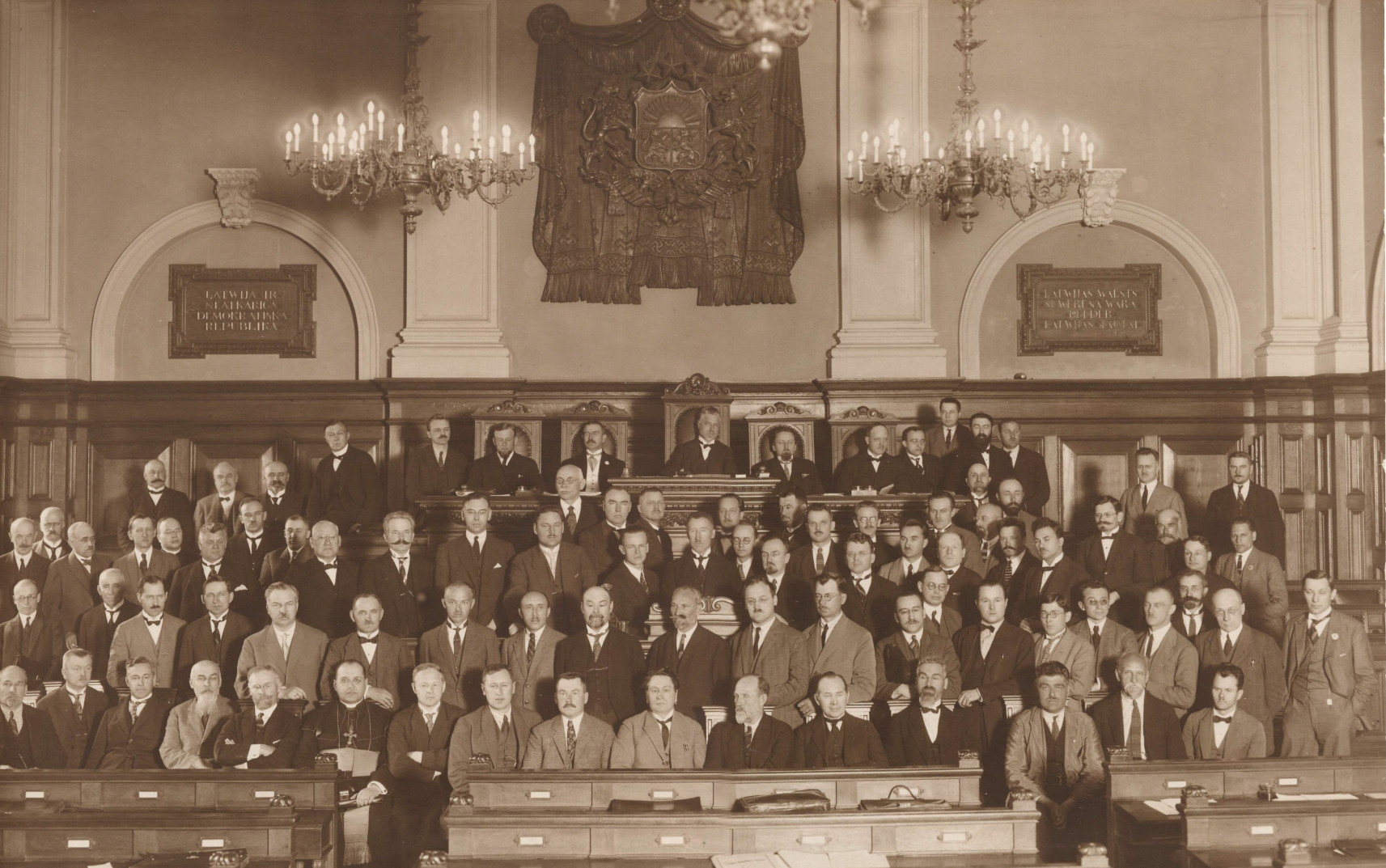
Representatives of the 1st Saeima of the Republic of Latvia in 1922

In the 19th century, as the concept of nations began to emerge, Juris Alunāns, a member of a Latvian nationalist group called the Young Latvians, claimed ownership to the word "saeims". Despite the similar sound, similar semantic structure and clear historical connotations, he claimed that it was a purely Latvian word that he had invented. As mentioned earlier, the word bears a similar meaning: "a gathering, a meeting, a council". He claimed that the word he constructed stemmed from the archaic Latvian word eima instead, meaning "to go" (derived from the PIE *ei "to go" and also a cognate with the Ancient Greek eimi, Gaulish eimu, among others).

He could not explain, however, how the s- prefix got added to the word, and what sense this addition made within the limits of the Latvian language. Nevertheless, according to Alunāns, the word is purely Latvian and completely independent of the aforementioned historical context. However, the prefix sa- to a verb in modern Latvian language usually stands for a complete action and the word "Saeima" can stand for a meaning "let's gather together completely".

In the pre-war Latvia, the Saeima was elected for three-year terms. The 1st Saeima met from 7 November 1922 to 2 November 1925, the 2nd from 3 November 1925 to 5 November 1928, the 3rd from 6 November 1928 to 2 November 1931, and the 4th from 3 November 1931 to 15 May 1934 (date of the Latvian coup d'état).

== Elections ==
The Saeima is an entirely elected body. All Latvian citizens (including naturalized citizens) over the age of 18 are eligible to vote. Candidates must be qualified to vote, but must also be over 21, must not be former employees of the USSR and Latvian SSR State security services, intelligence or counter-intelligence services or any other foreign affiliated organizations, must not have been convicted of a criminal offence or deemed to be of diminished mental capacity.

The term of the Saeima is four years. An election may be called early, but doing so is more complicated than in other parliamentary democracies. If the President proposes that the Saeima be dissolved, a national referendum must be held to confirm the dissolution. If the dissolution is not approved, the President is removed from office. If one-tenth of the electorate signs a petition demanding a dissolution, a referendum can be held without the involvement of the President.

There are five constituencies, Kurzeme (11 deputies), Latgale (12), Riga (38), Vidzeme (26), and Zemgale (13). Overseas votes are counted for the Riga constituency.

Seats are distributed in each constituency by open list proportional representation among the parties that overcome a 5% national election threshold using an unmodified version of the Webster/Sainte-Laguë method.

Voters cast a vote for a party list, which consists of the candidates that the party has submitted in that constituency. Although a specific ordering is listed for each candidate, which is determined by the party, this has no effect on the actual chances of each candidate. Instead, voters cast "specific votes" for candidates. This involves marking a green-colored "FOR" box opposite the candidate's name to indicate preference (positive votes), or marking a red-colored "AGAINST" box opposite the candidate's name to indicate disapproval (negative votes). The mark may be a cross, tick, shading, or similar indication. An unaltered ballot paper may also be placed in the envelope. The number of votes for each candidate is calculated as the number of votes cast for the list, plus the number of positive votes they receive, minus the number of negative votes they receive. The candidates with the highest vote totals fill their party's seats.

It is uncommon for any party, alliance or coalition to achieve more than 30% of the vote in an election. The record is 35.8% for the United List alliance in the 2026 election. This means that a coalition has always been necessary.

If a seat falls vacant during a term of the Saeima, it is filled by the next candidate on the appropriate list.

The Communist Party of Latvia is the only political party that is banned.

== Most recent election ==
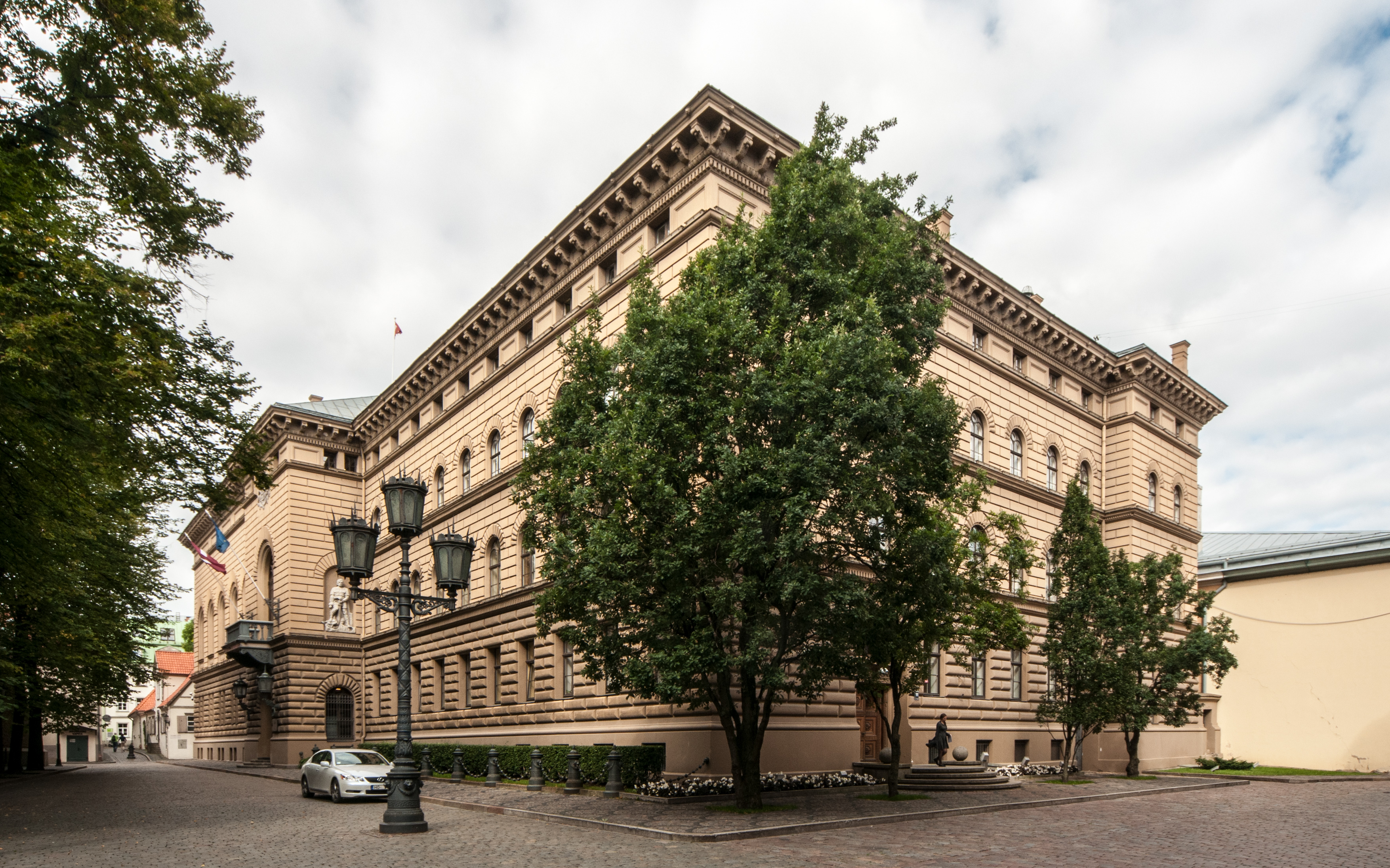
Saeima House, the parliament building, in 2015.

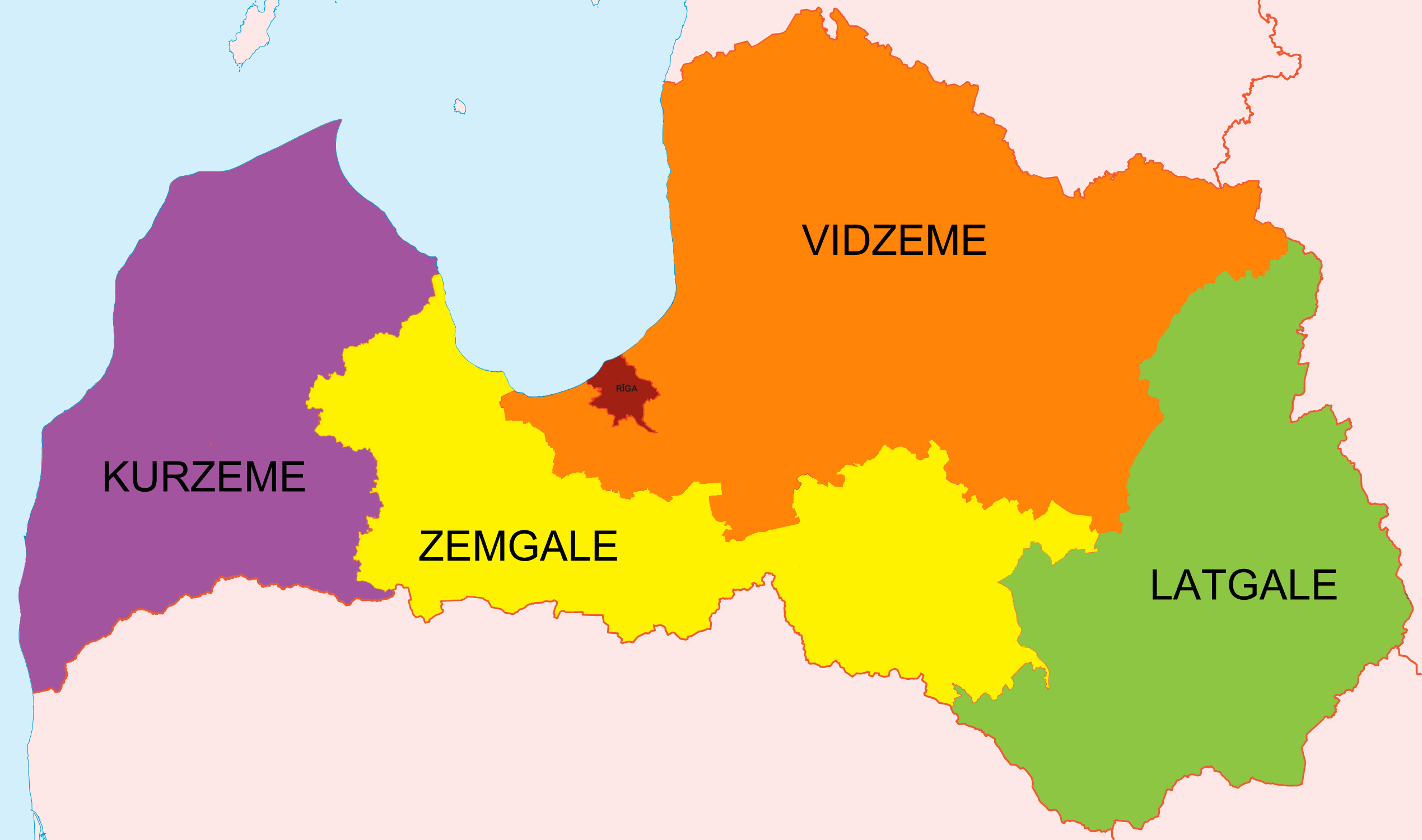
Deputies are elected from five constituencies, based on the cultural regions of Latvia.

Summary of the 3 October 2026 Latvian Saeima election results

Party	Votes	%	Seats	+/–
United List	283,892	35.76	41	+26
Latvia First	105,198	13.25	17	+8
Sovereign Power–Alliance of Young Latvians	94,211	11.87	15	+15
National Alliance	71,579	9.02	10	–3
The Progressives	63,382	7.98	10	0
New Unity	51,183	6.45	7	–19
Union of Greens and Farmers	35,405	4.46	0	–16
We Change the Rules	27,579	3.47	0	0
For Latvia's Development	17,533	2.21	0	0
For Stability!	16,062	2.02	0	–11
Rising Sun for Latvia	10,696	1.35	0	New
Gobzems' List	7,900	1.00	0	0
Harmony Centre	6,598	0.83	0	0
New Conservative Party	2,628	0.33	0	0
Total	793,846	100.00	100	0
Valid votes	793,846	98.41		
Invalid/blank votes	12,795	1.59		
Total votes	806,641	100.00		
Registered voters/turnout	1,557,615	51.79		
Source: Central Electoral Commission

== Historical structure of legislatures ==
=== 5th Saeima ===
36	15	13	12	7	6	6	5
Latvian Way	LNNK	Harmony	LZS	Equal Rights	For Fatherland and Freedom	KDS	Democratic Centre

=== 6th Saeima ===
18	17	16	14	8	8	8	6	5
Saimnieks	Latvian Way	People's movement "For Latvia"	For Fatherland and Freedom	LVP	LZS/KDS	LNNK/LZP	Harmony	LSP

=== 7th Saeima ===
24	21	17	16	14	8
TP	Latvian Way	For Fatherland and Freedom/LNNK	Harmony	LSDSP	JP

=== 8th Saeima ===
26	25	20	12	10	7
JL	PCTVL	TP	ZZS	LPP	For Fatherland and Freedom/LNNK

=== 9th Saeima ===
23	18	18	17	10	8	6
TP	ZZS	JL	Harmony	LPP/LC	For Fatherland and Freedom/LNNK	PCTVL

=== 10th Saeima ===
33	29	22	8	8
Unity	Harmony	ZZS	NA	(AŠ)²

=== 11th Saeima ===
31	22	20	14	13
Harmony	Reform	Unity	NA	ZZS

=== 12th Saeima ===
24	23	21	17	8	7
Harmony	Unity	ZZS	NA	LRA	NSL

=== 13th Saeima ===
23	16	16	13	13	11	8
Harmony	KPV	JKP	AP!	NA	ZZS	JV

=== 14th Saeima ===
26	16	15	13	11	10	9
JV	ZZS	AS	NA	ST!	PRO	LPV

=== 15th Saeima ===
41	17	15	10	10	7
AS	LPV	SV/AJ	NA	PRO	JV

== See also ==
- Category:Deputies of the Saeima
- Deputies of the Saeima
- List of Deputy Speakers of the Saeima
- People's Council of Latvia – provisional parliament from 1918 to 1920
- Constitutional Assembly of Latvia – consented to the Satversme in 1922
