= Courland (Saeima constituency) =

Constituency of the Saeima, the national legislature of Latvia

- Kurzeme; Kurāmō; Курземе
- Constituency for the Saeima
- Location of Courland within Latvia
- Municipality: List: Liepāja City; Ventspils City; Kuldīga; Saldus; South Kurzeme; Talsi; Ventspils
- Region: Courland
- Population: 233,229 (2022)
- Electorate: 180,070 (2022)
- Area: 13,611 km^{2} (2023)

Current constituency
- Created: 1922
- Seats: List: 12 (2018–present); 13 (2010–2018); 14 (1993–2010); 16 (1928–1934); 15 (1925–1928); 16 (1922–1925)
- Deputies: List: Uldis Augulis (ZZS); Inga Bērziņa (JV); Artūrs Butāns (NA); Ingrīda Circene (JV); Gundars Daudze (ZZS); Atis Deksnis (AS); Normunds Dzintars (NA); Linda Matisone (AS); Ramona Petraviča (LPV); Edgars Putra (AS); Jānis Vucāns (ZZS); Edgars Zelderis (PRO)

Courland (Latvian: Kurzeme; Livonian: Kurāmō, Russian: Курземе) is one of the five multi-member constituencies of the Saeima, the national legislature of Latvia. The constituency was established in 1922 when the Saeima was established following Latvia's independence. It consists of the cities of Liepāja and Ventspils and municipalities of Kuldīga, Saldus, South Kurzeme, Talsi and Ventspils in the region of Courland. The constituency currently elects 12 of the 100 members of the Saeima using the open party-list proportional representation electoral system. At the 2022 parliamentary election it had 180,070 registered electors.

== Electoral system ==
Courland currently elects 12 of the 100 members of the Saeima using the open party-list proportional representation electoral system. Constituency seats are allocated using the Sainte-Laguë method. Only parties that reach the 5% national threshold compete for constituency seats (4% in 1993).

== Election results ==
=== Summary ===
Election	SKG SKG / LSDSP / ATBILDĪBA / LSDA			Harmony SDPS / SC / TSP / SL			Development/For! AP! / LA			Greens & Farmers ZZS / LZS			New Unity JV / V / JL			Latvia First Latvian Way LPP/LC / LC			Conservatives K / JKP			Russian Union РСЛ / ЗаПЧЕЛ / P			Good Latvia PL / TP			National Alliance NA / TB/LNNK / TB		
Election	Votes	%	Seats	Votes	%	Seats	Votes	%	Seats	Votes	%	Seats	Votes	%	Seats	Votes	%	Seats	Votes	%	Seats	Votes	%	Seats	Votes	%	Seats	Votes	%	Seats
2022				2,328	2.05%	0	3,510	3.09%	0	24,230	21.36%	3	18,879	16.64%	2				3,316	2.92%	0	1,706	1.50%	0				11,768	10.37%	2
2018	330	0.32%	0	8,960	8.64%	1	11,830	11.40%	1	14,925	14.39%	2	5,839	5.63%	1				15,751	15.18%	2	912	0.88%	0				13,292	12.81%	2
2014				10,307	8.95%	1	796	0.69%	0	41,840	36.34%	5	23,034	20.01%	3				736	0.64%	0	575	0.50%	0				21,239	18.45%	2
2011	347	0.29%	0	15,347	12.98%	2				27,822	23.54%	3	21,770	18.42%	2	1,940	1.64%	0				434	0.37%	0				17,499	14.80%	2
2010	1,068	0.88%	0	15,534	12.87%	2				40,648	33.67%	5	38,383	31.79%	4							551	0.46%	0	9,846	8.15%	1	9,446	7.82%	1
2006	4,687	3.91%	0	6,386	5.33%	1				32,962	27.52%	4	19,086	15.94%	3	8,285	6.92%	1				3,029	2.53%	0	31,296	26.13%	4	7,537	6.29%	1
2002	5,472	4.02%	0							14,554	10.69%	2	36,281	26.66%	4	5,778	4.25%	0				8,284	6.09%	1	34,459	25.32%	4	7,563	5.56%	1
1998	19,237	14.33%	2	2,808	2.09%	0				3,964	2.95%	0				23,934	17.83%	3							40,316	30.03%	5	21,468	15.99%	3
1995	9,988	7.34%	0	1,857	1.37%	0				2,013	1.48%	0				24,530	18.04%	3										17,224	12.67%	2
1993	724	0.46%	0	6,147	3.88%	1				19,550	12.34%	2				73,268	46.24%	7				877	0.55%	0				13,293	8.39%	1
1931	33,154	22.93%	4							25,227	17.45%	3																		
1928	39,782	27.78%	5							30,088	21.01%	3																		
1925	49,553	37.18%	6							25,314	19.00%	3																		
1922	51,042	37.05%	6							26,531	19.26%	3																		

=== Detailed ===
Party has received at least 5% of the vote nationally and is entitled to compete for constituency seats (4% in 1993).

==== 2020s ====
===== 2022 =====
Results of the 2022 parliamentary election held on 1 October 2022:

Party		Votes per municipality							Total Votes	%	Seats
Party		Kuldīga	Liepāja City	Saldus	South Kur- zeme	Talsi	Vents- pils City	Vents- pils	Total Votes	%	Seats
United List	AS	2,165	9,729	2,424	6,298	2,553	1,423	737	25,329	22.33%	3
Union of Greens and Farmers	ZZS	3,236	2,611	3,348	2,703	4,646	5,868	1,818	24,230	21.36%	3
New Unity	JV	3,902	3,588	2,605	2,471	3,798	1,789	726	18,879	16.64%	2
National Alliance	NA	1,577	2,232	1,402	1,903	2,746	1,232	676	11,768	10.37%	2
The Progressives	PRO	685	1,127	631	532	1,728	641	168	5,512	4.86%	1
Latvia First	LPV	704	1,123	745	565	908	680	182	4,907	4.33%	1
For Each and Every One	KuK	555	937	470	416	639	380	118	3,515	3.10%	0
Development/For!	AP	505	827	615	430	654	339	140	3,510	3.09%	0
The Conservatives	K	630	538	427	446	690	438	147	3,316	2.92%	0
For Stability!	S!	58	1,366	68	79	77	804	35	2,487	2.19%	0
Social Democratic Party "Harmony"	SDPS	80	1,490	101	104	97	419	37	2,328	2.05%	0
Republic	R	514	375	215	243	275	171	49	1,842	1.62%	0
Sovereign Power	SV	97	768	119	144	264	342	39	1,773	1.56%	0
Latvian Russian Union	РСЛ	39	1,077	49	58	60	409	14	1,706	1.50%	0
People's Servants for Latvia	TKL	253	237	143	181	233	98	43	1,188	1.05%	0
Force of People's Power	TVS	66	198	57	48	85	100	22	576	0.51%	0
Union for Latvia	AL	42	61	34	57	41	39	10	284	0.25%	0
United for Latvia	VL	29	32	28	18	28	6	4	145	0.13%	0
Progressive Christian Party	KPP	21	26	21	16	31	19	8	142	0.13%	0
Valid votes		15,158	28,342	13,502	16,712	19,553	15,197	4,973	113,437	100.00%	12
Rejected votes		200	328	216	210	234	199	31	1,418	1.23%	
Valid envelopes		15,358	28,670	13,718	16,922	19,787	15,396	5,004	114,855	99.89%	
Rejected envelopes		11	36	11	24	21	13	6	122	0.11%	
Total polled		15,369	28,706	13,729	16,946	19,808	15,409	5,010	114,977	63.85%	
Registered electors		22,989	45,719	22,474	26,992	30,116	23,102	8,678	180,070		
Turnout		66.85%	62.79%	61.09%	62.78%	65.77%	66.70%	57.73%	63.85%		

The following candidates were elected: Arvils Ašeradens (JV), 21,556 votes; Uldis Augulis (ZZS), 27,941 votes; Inga Bērziņa (JV), 21,267 votes; Artūrs Butāns (NA), 12,739 votes; Gundars Daudze (ZZS), 27,199 votes; Atis Deksnis (AS), 27,182 votes; Ilze Indriksone (NA), 14,148 votes; Māris Kučinskis (AS), 28,269 votes; Linda Matisone (AS), 27,312 votes; Ramona Petraviča (LPV), 6,334 votes; Jānis Vucāns (ZZS), 26,348 votes; and Edgars Zelderis (PRO), 6,519 votes.

==== 2010s ====
===== 2018 =====
Results of the 2018 parliamentary election held on 6 October 2018:

Party		Votes	%	Seats
Who Owns the State?	KPV LV	21,220	20.46%	3
New Conservative Party	JKP	15,751	15.18%	2
Union of Greens and Farmers	ZZS	14,925	14.39%	2
National Alliance	NA	13,292	12.81%	2
Development/For!	AP	11,830	11.40%	1
Social Democratic Party "Harmony"	SDPS	8,960	8.64%	1
New Unity	JV	5,839	5.63%	1
Latvian Association of Regions	LRA	5,661	5.46%	0
The Progressives	PRO	2,695	2.60%	0
For Latvia from the Heart	NSL	1,241	1.20%	0
Latvian Russian Union	РСЛ	912	0.88%	0
Latvian Nationalists	LN	616	0.59%	0
SKG Alliance	SKG	330	0.32%	0
For an Alternative	PA	207	0.20%	0
Latvian Centrist Party	LCP	150	0.14%	0
Action Party	RP	106	0.10%	0
Valid votes		103,735	100.00%	12
Rejected votes		870	0.83%	
Valid envelopes		104,605	99.91%	
Rejected envelopes		98	0.09%	
Total polled		104,703	56.07%	
Registered electors		186,726		

The following candidates were elected: Valērijs Agešins (SDPS), 12,036 votes; Arvils Ašeradens (JV), 6,985 votes; Uldis Budriķis (JKP), 16,472 votes; Gundars Daudze (ZZS), 17,199 votes; Ilze Indriksone (NA), 14,592 votes; Juris Jurašs (JKP), 20,393 votes; Janīna Kursīte-Pakule (NA), 15,266 votes; Ramona Petraviča (KPV LV), 23,569 votes; Juris Pūce (AP), 13,655 votes; Ēriks Pucens (KPV LV), 23,213 votes; Jānis Vucāns (ZZS), 15,525 votes; and Atis Zakatistovs (KPV LV), 26,094 votes.

===== 2014 =====
Results of the 2014 parliamentary election held on 4 October 2014:

Party		Votes	%	Seats
Union of Greens and Farmers	ZZS	41,840	36.34%	5
Unity	V	23,034	20.01%	3
National Alliance	NA	21,239	18.45%	2
Social Democratic Party "Harmony"	SDPS	10,307	8.95%	1
For Latvia from the Heart	NSL	8,369	7.27%	1
Latvian Association of Regions	LRA	6,705	5.82%	1
United for Latvia	VL	980	0.85%	0
For Latvia's Development	LA	796	0.69%	0
New Conservative Party	JKP	736	0.64%	0
Latvian Russian Union	РСЛ	575	0.50%	0
Freedom. Free from Fear, Hate and Anger		308	0.27%	0
Izaugsme		121	0.11%	0
Sovereignty		111	0.10%	0
Valid votes		115,121	100.00%	13
Rejected votes		907	0.78%	
Valid envelopes		116,028	99.93%	
Rejected envelopes		82	0.07%	
Total polled		116,110	58.41%	
Registered electors		198,771		

The following candidates were elected: Valērijs Agešins (SDPS), 15,442 votes; Ringolds Balodis (NSL), 9,535 votes; Aija Barča (ZZS), 46,578 votes; Gaidis Bērziņš (NA), 27,668 votes; Ints Dālderis (V), 23,648 votes; Gundars Daudze (ZZS), 45,796 votes; Jānis Junkurs (V), 23,767 votes; Nellija Kleinberga (LRA), 7,013 votes; Janīna Kursīte-Pakule (NA), 24,886 votes; Inese Lībiņa-Egnere (V), 24,215 votes; Dana Reizniece-Ozola (ZZS), 51,070 votes; Valdis Skujiņš (ZZS), 42,825 votes; and Jānis Vucāns (ZZS), 43,296 votes.

===== 2011 =====
Results of the 2011 parliamentary election held on 17 September 2011:

Party		Votes	%	Seats
Zatlers' Reform Party	ZRP	30,749	26.01%	4
Union of Greens and Farmers	ZZS	27,822	23.54%	3
Unity	V	21,770	18.42%	2
National Alliance	NA	17,499	14.80%	2
Harmony Centre	SC	15,347	12.98%	2
Latvia's First Party/Latvian Way	LPP/LC	1,940	1.64%	0
Freedom. Free from Fear, Hate and Anger		732	0.62%	0
Last Party	PP	464	0.39%	0
For a Presidential Republic	PPR	434	0.37%	0
For Human Rights in a United Latvia	ЗаПЧЕЛ	434	0.37%	0
Christian Democratic Union	KDS	383	0.32%	0
Latvian Social Democratic Workers' Party	LSDSP	347	0.29%	0
People's Control	TK	279	0.24%	0
Valid votes		118,200	100.00%	13
Rejected votes		1,351	1.13%	
Valid envelopes		119,551	99.88%	
Rejected envelopes		146	0.12%	
Total polled		119,697	58.44%	
Registered electors		204,812		

The following candidates were elected: Solvita Āboltiņa (V), 25,060 votes; Valērijs Agešins (SC), 21,767 votes; Aija Barča (ZZS), 31,179 votes; Gaidis Bērziņš (NA), 22,557 votes; Inita Bišofa (ZRP), 33,702 votes; Edmunds Demiters (ZRP), 32,874 votes; Andrejs Elksniņš (SC), 17,526 votes; Jānis Junkurs (ZRP), 32,906 votes; Dzintars Kudums (NA), 19,228 votes; Janīna Kursīte-Pakule (V), 24,247 votes; Inese Lībiņa-Egnere (ZRP), 34,336 votes; Dana Reizniece-Ozola (ZZS), 31,367 votes; and Jānis Vucāns (ZZS), 29,809 votes.

===== 2010 =====
Results of the 2010 parliamentary election held on 2 October 2010:

Party		Votes	%	Seats
Union of Greens and Farmers	ZZS	40,648	33.67%	5
Unity	V	38,383	31.79%	4
Harmony Centre	SC	15,534	12.87%	2
For a Good Latvia	PL	9,846	8.15%	1
National Alliance	NA	9,446	7.82%	1
Made in Latvia	RL	1,789	1.48%	0
For a Presidential Republic	PPR	1,289	1.07%	0
Responsibility – Social Democratic Alliance of Political Parties	ATBILDĪBA	1,068	0.88%	0
Last Party	PP	973	0.81%	0
People's Control	TK	600	0.50%	0
For Human Rights in a United Latvia	ЗаПЧЕЛ	551	0.46%	0
Christian Democratic Union	KDS	473	0.39%	0
Daugava – For Latvia	ZRP	141	0.12%	0
Valid votes		120,741	100.00%	13
Rejected votes		3,445	2.77%	
Valid envelopes		124,186	99.84%	
Rejected envelopes		203	0.16%	
Total polled		124,389	60.77%	
Registered electors		204,689		

The following candidates were elected: Solvita Āboltiņa (V), 45,797 votes; Valērijs Agešins (SC), 22,946 votes; Aija Barča (ZZS), 42,650 votes; Silva Bendrāte (V), 39,254 votes; Gaidis Bērziņš (NA), 10,730 votes; Ingrīda Circene (V), 40,349 votes; Gundars Daudze (ZZS), 46,170 votes; Valērijs Kravcovs (SC), 17,307 votes; Janīna Kursīte-Pakule (V), 42,849 votes; Dana Reizniece (ZZS), 41,386 votes; Jānis Vucāns (ZZS), 41,405 votes; Edgars Zalāns (PL), 11,682 votes; and Oskars Zīds (ZZS), 40,919 votes.

==== 2000s ====
===== 2006 =====
Results of the 2006 parliamentary election held on 7 October 2006:

Party		Votes per district							Total Votes	%	Seats
Party		Kuldīga	Liepāja City	Liepāja	Saldus	Talsi	Vents- pils City	Vents- pils	Total Votes	%	Seats
Union of Greens and Farmers	ZZS	4,106	3,370	5,263	3,774	6,914	6,730	2,805	32,962	27.52%	4
People's Party	TP	5,053	8,291	5,341	4,413	5,948	1,375	875	31,296	26.13%	4
New Era Party	JL	2,594	4,235	3,160	2,537	3,877	1,797	886	19,086	15.94%	3
Latvia's First Party/Latvian Way	LPP/LC	921	2,433	1,448	848	1,543	830	262	8,285	6.92%	1
For Fatherland and Freedom/LNNK	TB/LNNK	967	1,905	1,219	774	1,484	842	346	7,537	6.29%	1
Harmony Centre	SC	143	3,971	146	233	244	1,601	48	6,386	5.33%	1
Latvian Social Democratic Workers' Party	LSDSP	645	988	835	915	669	428	207	4,687	3.91%	0
For Human Rights in a United Latvia	ЗаПЧЕЛ	73	1,417	95	110	124	1,150	60	3,029	2.53%	0
New Democrats	NJD	310	505	352	221	266	149	83	1,886	1.57%	0
All for Latvia!		251	276	280	224	340	157	135	1,663	1.39%	0
Pensioners and Seniors Party	PSP	92	151	134	104	256	57	28	822	0.69%	0
Māra's Land		38	115	62	62	82	48	14	421	0.35%	0
Eurosceptics		51	92	31	44	60	55	12	345	0.29%	0
Motherland		17	84	24	30	35	81	8	279	0.23%	0
Social Fairness Party	STP	9	40	27	22	82	83	3	266	0.22%	0
National Power Union	NSS	20	122	38	18	31	11	6	246	0.21%	0
Latvian's Latvia National Political Defence Organisation		13	18	14	112	51	11	3	222	0.19%	0
Our Land Party		18	42	29	21	30	29	35	204	0.17%	0
Fatherland Union	TS	19	20	24	16	37	17	7	140	0.12%	0
Valid votes		15,340	28,075	18,522	14,478	22,073	15,451	5,823	119,762	100.00%	14
Rejected votes									811	0.67%	
Valid envelopes									120,573	99.86%	
Rejected envelopes									173	0.14%	
Total polled									120,746	60.02%	
Registered electors									201,167		

The following candidates were elected: Valērijs Agešins (SC), 8,542 votes; Māris Ārbergs (TP), 31,912 votes; Aija Barča (TP), 32,075 votes; Silva Bendrāte (JL), 20,200 votes; Guntis Blumbergs (ZZS), 34,418 votes; Uldis Briedis (TP), 31,820 votes; Augusts Brigmanis (ZZS), 34,371 votes; Ingrīda Circene (JL), 22,332 votes; Gundars Daudze (ZZS), 34,064 votes; Uldis-Ivars Grava (JL), 19,405 votes; Pēteris Hanka (ZZS), 34,377 votes; Oskars Kastēns (LPP/LC), 8,688 votes; Jānis Lagzdiņš (TP), 34,191 votes; and Gunārs Laicāns (TB/LNNK), 8,109 votes.

===== 2002 =====
Results of the 2002 parliamentary election held on 5 October 2002:

Party		Votes per district							Total Votes	%	Seats
Party		Kuldīga	Liepāja City	Liepāja	Saldus	Talsi	Vents- pils City	Vents- pils	Total Votes	%	Seats
New Era Party	JL	4,625	7,939	5,309	4,609	6,973	5,161	1,665	36,281	26.66%	4
People's Party	TP	5,731	8,089	5,998	4,883	7,071	1,570	1,117	34,459	25.32%	4
Latvia's First Party	LPP	2,377	3,656	2,883	1,924	3,618	2,501	1,051	18,010	13.23%	2
Union of Greens and Farmers	ZZS	1,900	1,246	3,381	2,520	3,010	1,418	1,079	14,554	10.69%	2
For Human Rights in a United Latvia	ЗаПЧЕЛ	382	3,898	355	450	466	2,592	141	8,284	6.09%	1
For Fatherland and Freedom/LNNK	TB/LNNK	1,080	1,654	1,325	823	1,410	878	393	7,563	5.56%	1
Latvian Way	LC	948	953	880	693	1,299	643	362	5,778	4.25%	0
Latvian Social Democratic Workers' Party	LSDSP	775	1,355	840	624	718	912	248	5,472	4.02%	0
Social Democratic Union	SDS	358	361	414	388	596	224	202	2,543	1.87%	0
Social Democratic Welfare Party	SDLP	60	345	74	62	71	103	19	734	0.54%	0
Political Alliance "Centre"		106	107	93	119	106	73	11	615	0.45%	0
Latvians' Party	LP	51	115	55	54	68	127	45	515	0.38%	0
Latvian Revival Party	LAP	37	56	60	53	42	42	15	305	0.22%	0
Russian Party		15	109	19	29	25	66	13	276	0.20%	0
Citizens' Union "Our Land"		18	29	18	11	47	40	15	178	0.13%	0
Freedom Party	BP	44	18	15	22	22	18	13	152	0.11%	0
Māra's Land		12	35	23	18	14	20	8	130	0.10%	0
Progressive Centre Party	PCP	4	26	10	18	9	20	1	88	0.06%	0
Light of Latgale	LG	14	29	10	4	8	10	4	79	0.06%	0
Latvian United Republican Party	LARP	8	15	18	7	10	7	8	73	0.05%	0
Valid votes		18,545	30,035	21,780	17,311	25,583	16,425	6,410	136,089	100.00%	14
Rejected votes									657	0.48%	
Valid envelopes									136,746	99.77%	
Rejected envelopes									312	0.23%	
Total polled									137,058	71.45%	
Registered electors									191,828		

The following candidates were elected: Dzintars Ābiķis (TP), 37,749 votes; Valērijs Agešins (ЗаПЧЕЛ), 9,957 votes; Silva Bendrāte (JL), 38,732 votes; Ingrīda Circene (JL), 38,742 votes; Silva Golde (TP), 38,254 votes; Māris Grīnblats (TB/LNNK), 9,052 votes; Edgars Jaunups (JL), 38,396 votes; Pēteris Kalniņš (ZZS), 15,372 votes; Jānis Lagzdiņš (TP), 39,979 votes; Vineta Muižniece (TP), 37,007 votes; Leopolds Ozoliņš (ZZS), 15,558 votes; Andrejs Radzevičs (JL), 37,851 votes; Ainārs Šlesers (LPP), 20,318 votes; and Inese Šlesere (LPP), 19,902 votes.

==== 1990s ====
===== 1998 =====
Results of the 1998 parliamentary election held on 3 October 1998:

Party		Votes per district							Total Votes	%	Seats
Party		Kuldīga	Liepāja City	Liepāja	Saldus	Talsi	Vents- pils City	Vents- pils	Total Votes	%	Seats
People's Party	TP	5,102	10,807	6,872	5,272	8,553	2,257	1,453	40,316	30.03%	5
Latvian Way	LC	3,348	3,770	4,140	3,138	4,958	3,132	1,448	23,934	17.83%	3
For Fatherland and Freedom/LNNK	TB/LNNK	2,886	5,042	3,337	2,385	4,069	2,729	1,020	21,468	15.99%	3
Latvian Social Democratic Alliance	LSDA	2,960	3,241	2,963	2,861	3,725	2,463	1,024	19,237	14.33%	2
New Party	JP	1,703	1,957	1,840	1,516	2,126	1,708	793	11,643	8.67%	1
Latvian Farmers' Union	LZS	686	214	1,021	546	779	357	361	3,964	2.95%	0
Workers' Party, Christian Democratic Union and Latvian Green Party	DP–KDS–LZP	638	597	704	436	625	277	135	3,412	2.54%	0
National Harmony Party	TSP	131	1,404	161	182	218	663	49	2,808	2.09%	0
People's Movement for Latvia	TKL	240	407	594	383	401	109	81	2,215	1.65%	0
Democratic Party "Saimnieks"		196	279	302	160	279	129	80	1,425	1.06%	0
Latvian Unity Party	LVP	210	47	121	152	81	29	76	716	0.53%	0
Latvian Revival Party	LAP	96	116	152	121	81	67	29	662	0.49%	0
Helsinki-86		65	115	106	49	48	49	12	444	0.33%	0
Latvian National Democratic Party	LNDP	45	48	89	58	90	49	32	411	0.31%	0
Popular Movement "Freedom"		75	50	62	72	74	42	14	389	0.29%	0
Conservative Party	KP	123	43	36	45	60	42	15	364	0.27%	0
Social Democratic Women's Organisation	SDSO	58	63	60	52	74	34	22	363	0.27%	0
Mara's Land	MZ	18	16	62	22	91	11	8	228	0.17%	0
National Progress Party	NPP	23	26	10	17	23	12	5	116	0.09%	0
Democrats' Party	DP	24	8	11	15	17	5	7	87	0.06%	0
Latvian National Reform Party	LNRP	4	7	4	5	12	2	3	37	0.03%	0
Valid votes		18,631	28,257	22,647	17,487	26,384	14,166	6,667	134,239	100.00%	14
Rejected votes		100	154	76	91	141	97	47	706	0.52%	
Valid envelopes		18,731	28,411	22,723	17,578	26,525	14,263	6,714	134,945	99.73%	
Rejected envelopes									360	0.27%	
Total polled									135,305	72.93%	
Registered electors									185,531		

The following candidates were elected: Aija Barča (LSDA), 20,893 votes; Aivars Boja (LC), 24,571 votes; Leons Bojārs (LSDA), 21,090 votes; Guntis Dambergs (LC), 24,741 votes; Silva Golde (TP), 43,010 votes; Ģirts Valdis Kristovskis (TB/LNNK), 24,199 votes; Dzintars Kudums (TB/LNNK), 22,321 votes; Linards Muciņš (LC), 24,308 votes; Mareks Segliņš (TP), 42,562 votes; Jēkabs Sproģis (TP), 41,849 votes; Jānis Straume (TB/LNNK), 23,113 votes; Aivars Tiesnesis (TP), 41,942 votes; Ingrīda Ūdre (JP), 12,326 votes; and Vineta Uškāne (TP), 41,882 votes.

===== 1995 =====
Results of the 1995 parliamentary election held on 30 September and 1 October 1995:

Party		Votes	%	Seats
People's Movement for Latvia	TKL	24,558	18.06%	3
Latvian Way	LC	24,530	18.04%	3
Democratic Party "Saimnieks"	DPS	20,985	15.43%	3
For Fatherland and Freedom	TB	17,224	12.67%	2
Latvian Farmers' Union, Christian Democratic Union and Latgalian Labour Party	LZS-KDS-LDP	11,704	8.61%	1
Labour and Justice Coalition: LDDP, LSDSP and LACAP	LDDP-LSDSP-LACAP	9,988	7.34%	0
Latvian Unity Party	LVP	8,929	6.57%	1
Latvian National Conservative Party and Latvian Green Party	LNNK-LZP	6,856	5.04%	1
Latvian Farmers' Union	LZS	2,013	1.48%	0
National Harmony Party	TSP	1,857	1.37%	0
Popular Front of Latvia	LTF	1,777	1.31%	0
Political Union of Economists	TPA	1,601	1.18%	0
Political Association of the Underprivileged and Latvian Independence Party		1,110	0.82%	0
Socialist Party of Latvia	LSP	979	0.72%	0
Citizens Union "Our Land" – Anti-Communist Union		756	0.56%	0
Party of Russian Citizens in Latvia	ПргЛ	511	0.38%	0
Democrats' Party	DP	236	0.17%	0
Latvian Liberal Party	LLP	218	0.16%	0
Latvian National Democratic Party	LNDP	160	0.12%	0
Valid votes		135,992	100.00%	14

The following candidates were elected: Dzintars Ābiķis (LC), 25,051 votes; Edgars Bāns (LVP), 10,000 votes; Gunta Gannusa (TKL), 25,622 votes; Edmunds Grīnbergs (TKL), 25,741 votes; Aigars Jirgens (TB), 18,166 votes; Juris Kaksītis (DPS), 21,628 votes; Jānis Kalviņš (LNNK-LZP), 7,465 votes; Jānis Kazāks (TKL), 25,866 votes; Jānis Lagzdiņš (LC), 26,473 votes; Kristiāna Lībane (LC), 23,658 votes; Valdis Nagobads (DPS), 21,547 votes; Atis Sausnītis (DPS), 21,459 votes; Māris Vītols (LZS-KDS-LDP), 12,976 votes; and Roberts Zīle (TB), 17,738 votes.

===== 1993 =====
Results of the 1993 parliamentary election held on 5 and 6 June 1993:

Party		Votes per district							Total Votes	%	Seats
Party		Kuldīga	Liepāja City	Liepāja	Saldus	Talsi	Vents- pils City	Vents- pils	Total Votes	%	Seats
Latvian Way	LC	10,899	14,404	13,140	8,649	14,157	7,643	4,376	73,268	46.24%	7
Latvian Farmers' Union	LZS	2,813	1,833	4,771	3,507	4,524	939	1,163	19,550	12.34%	2
For Fatherland and Freedom	TB	1,315	4,149	2,711	1,499	1,769	1,460	390	13,293	8.39%	1
Latvian National Independence Movement	LNNK	1,480	2,742	1,469	1,472	3,768	1,240	569	12,740	8.04%	1
Democratic Center Party of Latvia	DCP	1,608	1,382	1,438	1,361	2,133	1,416	718	10,056	6.35%	1
Christian Democratic Union	KDS	1,057	1,733	1,216	710	1,291	854	385	7,246	4.57%	1
Harmony for Latvia	SL	1,123	1,059	1,458	834	637	648	388	6,147	3.88%	1
Popular Front of Latvia	LTF	629	1,350	982	466	760	370	177	4,734	2.99%	0
Green List		550	257	261	143	318	133	58	1,720	1.09%	0
Democratic Labour Party of Latvia	LDDP	231	259	205	613	278	69	36	1,691	1.07%	0
Economic Activity League		211	164	221	136	225	86	220	1,263	0.80%	0
Latvia's Happiness		215	247	182	192	252	92	80	1,260	0.80%	0
Anti-Communist Union		175	137	125	265	176	91	56	1,025	0.65%	0
Equal Rights	Р	48	465	77	56	85	125	21	877	0.55%	0
Citizens Union "Our Land"		105	95	123	137	220	105	36	821	0.52%	0
Latvian Social Democratic Workers' Party	LSDSP	102	150	120	94	131	87	40	724	0.46%	0
Republican Platform		173	90	78	66	90	103	94	694	0.44%	0
Russian National Democratic List		23	396	20	54	40	126	16	675	0.43%	0
Conservatives and Peasants		61	33	54	54	77	30	22	331	0.21%	0
Independents' Union		46	47	34	33	30	14	10	214	0.14%	0
Latvian Unity Party	LVP	24	7	15	29	11	15	9	110	0.07%	0
Valid votes		22,888	30,999	28,700	20,370	30,972	15,646	8,864	158,439	100.00%	14
Rejected votes		175	458	99	47	406	170	13	1,368	0.86%	
Valid envelopes		23,063	31,457	28,799	20,417	31,378	15,816	8,877	159,807	100.00%	

The following candidates were elected: Alfrēds Čepānis (DCP), 12,894 votes; Pēteris Cimdiņš (KDS), 7,441 votes; Ilmārs Dāliņš (TB), 15,659 votes; Pēteris Elferts (LC), Māris Graudiņš (LC), 70,594 votes; Andris Gūtmanis (LC), 70,180 votes; Juris Janeks (SL), 6,959 votes; Jānis Lagzdiņš (LC), 77,473 votes; Uldis Osis (LC), 70,647 votes; Oļģerts Pavlovskis (LC), 73,313 votes; Andris Rozentāls (LZS), 20,070 votes; Ivars Silārs (LC), 70,642 votes; Dainis Stalts (LNNK), 13,500 votes; and Jānis Ārvaldis Tupesis (LZS), 20,062 votes.

==== 1930s ====
===== 1931 =====
Results of the 1931 parliamentary election held on 3 and 4 October 1931:

Party		Votes per County					Total Votes	%	Seats
Party		Aizpute	Kuldīga	Liepāja	Talsi	Vents- pils	Total Votes	%	Seats
Latvian Social Democratic Workers' Party	LSDSP	2,932	4,768	17,378	4,541	3,535	33,154	22.93%	4
Latvian Farmers' Union	LZS	3,873	5,744	8,297	4,099	3,214	25,227	17.45%	3
Latvian New Farmers and Small Landowners Party	LJSP	1,768	3,332	3,703	2,636	2,377	13,816	9.56%	2
Leftist Workers and Farm Labourers	KSDZ	896	1,704	3,349	1,304	2,692	9,945	6.88%	1
Democratic Centre	DC	868	1,772	3,538	1,548	1,742	9,468	6.55%	1
German-Baltic Party in Latvia	DbPL	400	1,042	4,081	337	835	6,695	4.63%	1
Zionist Organisation Mizrachi		381	626	4,096	561	742	6,406	4.43%	1
Progressive Association	PA	406	1,185	2,455	788	1,416	6,250	4.32%	1
Christian Union and Workers	KAS	153	612	3,087	757	492	5,101	3.53%	1
Christian Workers' Union	KDLS	409	373	2,426	589	1,043	4,840	3.35%	1
Union for Peace, Order and Production		152	822	2,603	655	389	4,621	3.20%	0
Christian Peasants and Catholics	KZK	1,806	404	1,051	1,033	282	4,576	3.16%	0
Party of Former Money Depositors		349	842	1,422	844	1,102	4,559	3.15%	0
Women's Organisations		229	192	1,893	211	704	3,229	2.23%	0
Courlanders' Association		24	107	55	305	2,603	3,094	2.14%	0
National Union	NA	52	183	891	196	159	1,481	1.02%	0
Unsatisfied New Farmers, Small Landholders and Fishermen		98	104	324	378	168	1,072	0.74%	0
Agudas Israel		29	88	413	174	49	753	0.52%	0
Workers and Poor Peasants		38	44	102	57	62	303	0.21%	0
Valid votes		14,863	23,944	61,164	21,013	23,606	144,590	100.00%	16
Rejected votes							763	0.52%	
Valid envelopes							145,353	99.97%	
Rejected envelopes							41	0.03%	
Total polled							145,394		

==== 1920s ====
===== 1928 =====
Results of the 1928 parliamentary election held on 6 and 7 October 1928:

Party		Votes per County					Total Votes	%	Seats
Party		Aizpute	Kuldīga	Liepāja	Talsi	Vents- pils	Total Votes	%	Seats
Latvian Social Democratic Workers' Party	LSDSP	3,992	6,366	18,919	6,185	4,320	39,782	27.78%	5
Latvian Farmers' Union	LZS	3,601	6,467	10,216	4,648	5,156	30,088	21.01%	3
Leftist Workers and Farm Labourers	KSDZ	1,094	2,007	3,810	1,030	4,059	12,000	8.38%	1
Latvian New Farmers and Small Landowners Party	LJSP	1,319	1,796	2,008	2,201	2,088	9,412	6.57%	1
Zionist Organisation Mizrachi		403	674	4,105	644	762	6,588	4.60%	1
German-Baltic Party in Latvia	DbPL	580	1,295	3,337	484	746	6,442	4.50%	1
Christian Union and Workers Party	KASP	287	560	3,546	795	922	6,110	4.27%	1
Union for Peace, Order and Production	MKRA	192	633	2,565	550	663	4,603	3.21%	1
Christian Workers' Union	KDLS	488	222	2,064	414	1,296	4,484	3.13%	1
Democratic Centre	DC	336	590	1,321	390	1,277	3,914	2.73%	1
Latvian New Farmers' Union	LJS	322	740	991	425	485	2,963	2.07%	0
Christian Peasant and Catholic Party	KZKP	1,880	253	498	77	235	2,943	2.06%	0
Union of Social Democrats and Farmers		234	479	800	522	525	2,560	1.79%	0
National Union	NA	117	423	1,331	295	359	2,525	1.76%	0
Party of Former Money Depositors and Other Victims		131	690	510	516	458	2,305	1.61%	0
Latvian Women's Union		172	219	643	199	247	1,480	1.03%	0
Latgallian Independent Socialist Party	LNSP	47	304	429	128	449	1,357	0.95%	0
Latvian Labour Union	LDS	62	261	413	229	330	1,295	0.90%	0
All-Latvian National Assembly		13	60	81	197	319	670	0.47%	0
Latvian Polish-Catholic Union	ZPwŁ	9	12	457	9	14	501	0.35%	0
Radical Democrats		44	70	181	100	40	435	0.30%	0
Jewish Democratic Bloc		10	39	197	16	74	336	0.23%	0
Agudas Israel		6	9	161	40	8	224	0.16%	0
People's Rights and Health Defenders		15	30	88	23	18	174	0.12%	0
Valid votes		15,354	24,199	58,671	20,117	24,850	143,191	100.00%	16
Rejected votes							892	0.62%	
Valid envelopes							144,083	99.96%	
Rejected envelopes							55	0.04%	
Total polled							144,138		

===== 1925 =====
Results of the 1925 parliamentary election held on 3 and 4 October 1925:

Party		Votes per County						Total Votes	%	Seats		
Party		Aizpute	Kuldīga	Liepāja	Talsi	Vents- pils	County Comm-ission	Total Votes	%	Con.	Com.	Tot.
Latvian Social Democratic Workers' Party	LSDSP	5,130	8,101	22,424	5,943	7,920	35	49,553	37.18%	6	0	6
Latvian Farmers' Union	LZS	3,047	6,309	8,189	3,563	4,186	20	25,314	19.00%	3	0	3
German-Baltic Party in Latvia	DbPL	458	1,353	3,851	688	821	2	7,173	5.38%	1	0	1
Social Democrats Mensheviks	SDM	884	1,270	1,411	1,388	1,510	3	6,466	4.85%	1	0	1
Democratic Centre	DC	419	793	1,841	745	1,432	6	5,236	3.93%	1	0	1
Latvian New Farmers-Small Landowners Party	LJSP	396	1,085	1,155	1,347	1,234	2	5,219	3.92%	1	0	1
Zionist Organisation Mizrachi		296	347	3,240	347	186	0	4,416	3.31%	1	0	1
Latvian New Farmers' Union	LJS	764	888	683	1,046	891	6	4,278	3.21%	1	0	1
National Union	NA	283	610	2,195	595	575	6	4,264	3.20%	0	1	1
Union for Peace, Order and Production	MKRA	160	483	2,213	497	429	3	3,785	2.84%	0	1	1
Christian Workers' Union	KDJS	439	318	1,608	378	784	3	3,530	2.65%	0	0	0
National Farmers' Union	NZS	261	276	1,866	384	141	1	2,929	2.20%	0	0	0
Party of Catholics and Christian Peasants	KKZP	1,706	208	433	20	187	0	2,554	1.92%	0	0	0
Christian National Union	KNS	73	488	590	395	808	2	2,356	1.77%	0	0	0
Agudas Israel		35	113	475	206	222	1	1,052	0.79%	0	0	0
Congress of Destroyed Areas and Agricultural Association		134	155	359	138	196	3	985	0.74%	0	0	0
Latvian Labour Union	LDS	31	97	309	151	125	3	716	0.54%	0	0	0
Union of Orthodox Voters and Russian Organisations	П	16	35	382	105	90	0	628	0.47%	0	0	0
Polish-Catholic Latvian Union of Poles	ZPwŁ	6	13	532	10	16	0	577	0.43%	0	0	0
Ceire Cion		59	124	155	28	149	1	516	0.39%	0	0	0
Combined Workers, Disabled People and Workers		88	46	191	70	44	0	439	0.33%	0	0	0
Jewish National Democratic Party		5	68	194	23	108	0	398	0.30%	0	0	0
Russian People's Workers' Party		3	15	159	43	21	0	241	0.18%	0	0	0
Histadruth-Hacionith		3	21	111	22	73	0	230	0.17%	0	0	0
Economically Active Citizens		8	19	149	22	29	0	227	0.17%	0	0	0
Union of Latvian Democrats	LDS	12	23	85	11	50	1	182	0.14%	0	0	0
Valid votes		14,716	23,258	54,800	18,165	22,227	98	133,264	100.00%	15	2	17
Rejected votes												
Valid envelopes												
Rejected envelopes												
Total polled												
Registered electors		20,049	34,295	66,170	25,770	31,471		177,755				

===== 1922 =====
Results of the 1922 parliamentary election held on 7 and 8 October 1922:

Party		Votes per County						Total Votes	%	Seats		
Party		Aizpute	Kuldīga	Liepāja	Talsi	Vents- pils	County Comm-ission	Total Votes	%	Con.	Com.	Tot.
Latvian Social Democratic Workers' Party	LSDSP	7,853	9,231	18,215	8,266	7,403	74	51,042	37.05%	6	0	6
Latvian Farmers' Union	LZS	4,305	6,132	6,996	5,650	3,407	41	26,531	19.26%	3	0	3
Christian National Union	KNS	1,735	974	5,585	1,439	1,973	25	11,731	8.51%	1	0	1
Union of Social Democrats – Mensheviks and Rural Workers	SDML	1,593	2,606	2,353	2,843	2,198	7	11,600	8.42%	1	0	1
Democratic Centre	DC	1,139	1,221	4,190	1,294	1,604	12	9,460	6.87%	1	0	1
German-Baltic Party in Latvia	DbPL	570	1,364	4,511	979	842	4	8,270	6.00%	1	0	1
United Jewish National Bloc	EANB	429	561	3,968	317	472	19	5,766	4.19%	1	0	1
Latvian New Farmers' Union	LJS	454	898	810	1,703	713	8	4,586	3.33%	1	0	1
Non-Partisan National Centre	BNC	298	620	1,735	691	824	7	4,175	3.03%	1	0	1
Latvian Fishermen's Union and Group of Sailors		188	18	775	612	1,136	32	2,761	2.00%	0	0	0
United Polish Parties	ZPwŁ	20	26	702	20	38	1	807	0.59%	0	0	0
Land Workers' Association		128	78	106	68	47	1	428	0.31%	0	0	0
Ceire Cion	CC	43	36	111	138	31	0	359	0.26%	0	0	0
Agudas Israel		3	12	19	164	55	0	253	0.18%	0	0	0
Valid votes		18,758	23,777	50,076	24,184	20,743	231	137,769	100.00%	16	0	16
Rejected votes								1,512	1.09%			
Valid envelopes								139,281				
Rejected envelopes												
Total polled												
Registered electors		23,054	31,282	51,330	30,712	27,119		163,497				
