= Silva (given name) =

Female given name

- Gender: Female
- Name day: October 11

Origin
- Region of origin: Latvia

Silva is a Latvian and Armenian feminine given name. The associated name day in Latvia is October 11.

== Notable people named Silva ==
- Silva Bendrāte (born 1956), Latvian journalist and politician
- Silva Golde (1955–2013), Latvian politician and educator
- Silva Hakobyan (born 1988), Armenian singer
- Silva Kaputikyan (1919–2006), Armenian poet
- Sylva Kelegian (born 1962), American actress
- Silva Shahakian (born 1985), Iraqi–Armenian beauty pageant titleholder; Miss Iraq 2006
