= Aizpute county =

16th–20th century county in Latvia

Aizpute county: Latvian: Aizputes apriņķis; German: Kreis Hasenpoth; Russian: Газенпотскій уѣздъ
- County of Latvia
- 1819–1949
- Coat of arms

- Map in 1940
- Capital: Aizpute (Gazenpot)
- Area
  - 1897: 2,506.58 km^{2} (967.80 sq mi)
- Population
  - 1897: 53,209
- History
  - Established: 1819
  - Disestablished: 1949
Preceded by	Succeeded by
Duchy of Courland and Semigallia	Liepāja district

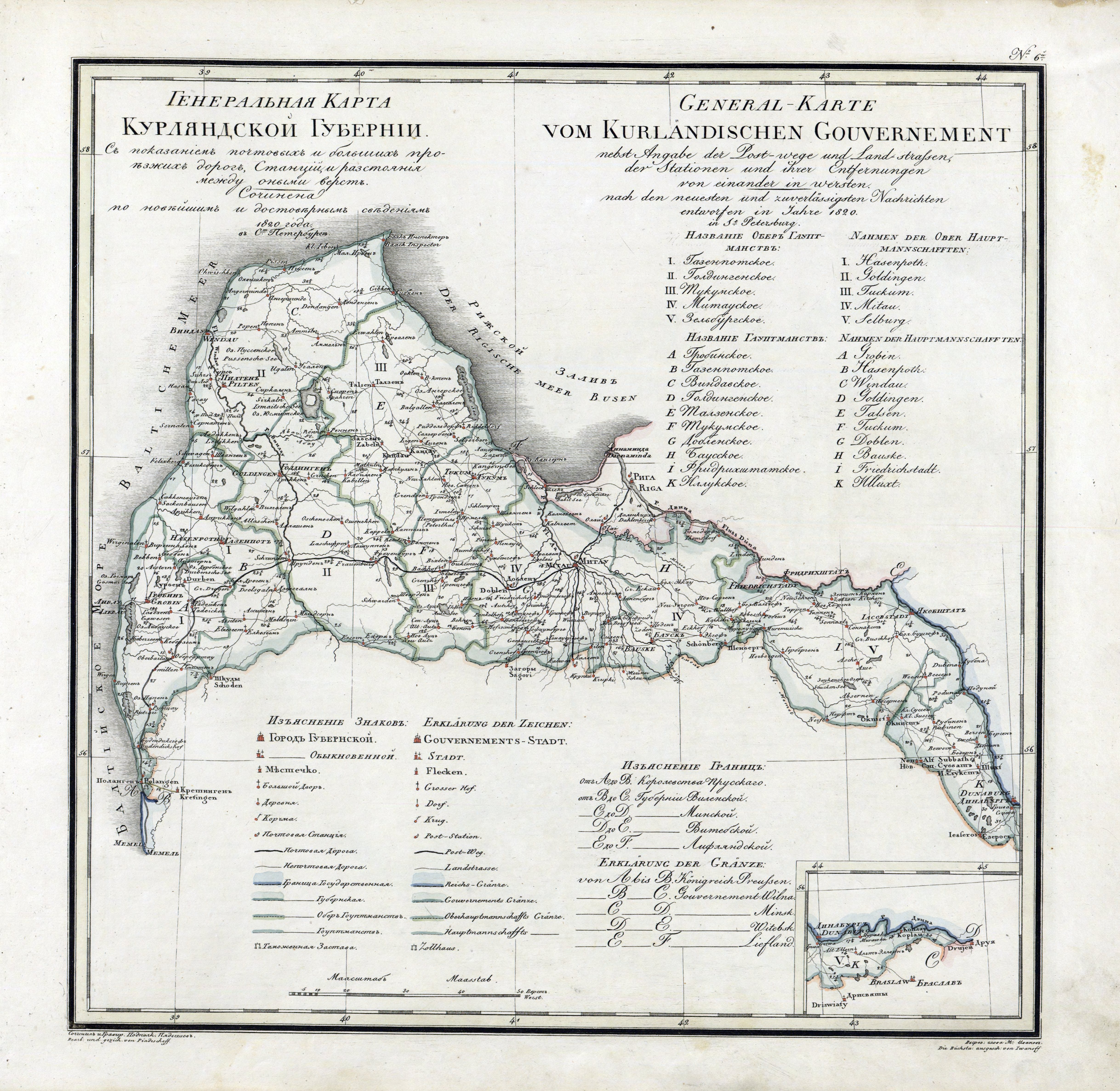
Hasenpoth County on the map of Courland Governorate (1820).

Aizpute county (Latvian: Aizputes apriņķis; German: Kreis Hasenpoth, Russian: Газенпотскій уѣздъ, romanized: Gazenpotskiy uyezd) was a historic county of the Courland Governorate and of the Republic of Latvia. Its capital was Aizpute (Hasenpoth).

== History ==
Created as the Chief Captaincy of Aizpute (German: Oberhauptmannschaft Hasenpoth) in 1819 was from southwestern parts of the Duchy of Courland and Semigallia and District of Pilten after incorporation into the Russian Empire. In 1864, County of Aizpute (Kreis Hasenpoth) became one of the ten counties of the Courland Governorate.

After establishment of the Republic of Latvia in 1918, the Aizputes apriņķis existed until 1949, when the Council of Ministers of the Latvian SSR split it into the newly created districts (rajons) of Aizpute (dissolved in 1962) and Alsunga (dissolved in 1956).

== Demographics ==
At the time of the Russian Empire Census of 1897, Kreis Hasenpoth had a population of 53,209. Of these, 90.4% spoke Latvian, 5.4% German, 2.5% Yiddish, 1.0% Lithuanian, 0.4% Russian, 0.2% Polish and 0.1% Romani as their native language.
