= Artūrs Butāns =

Latvian politician (born 1992)

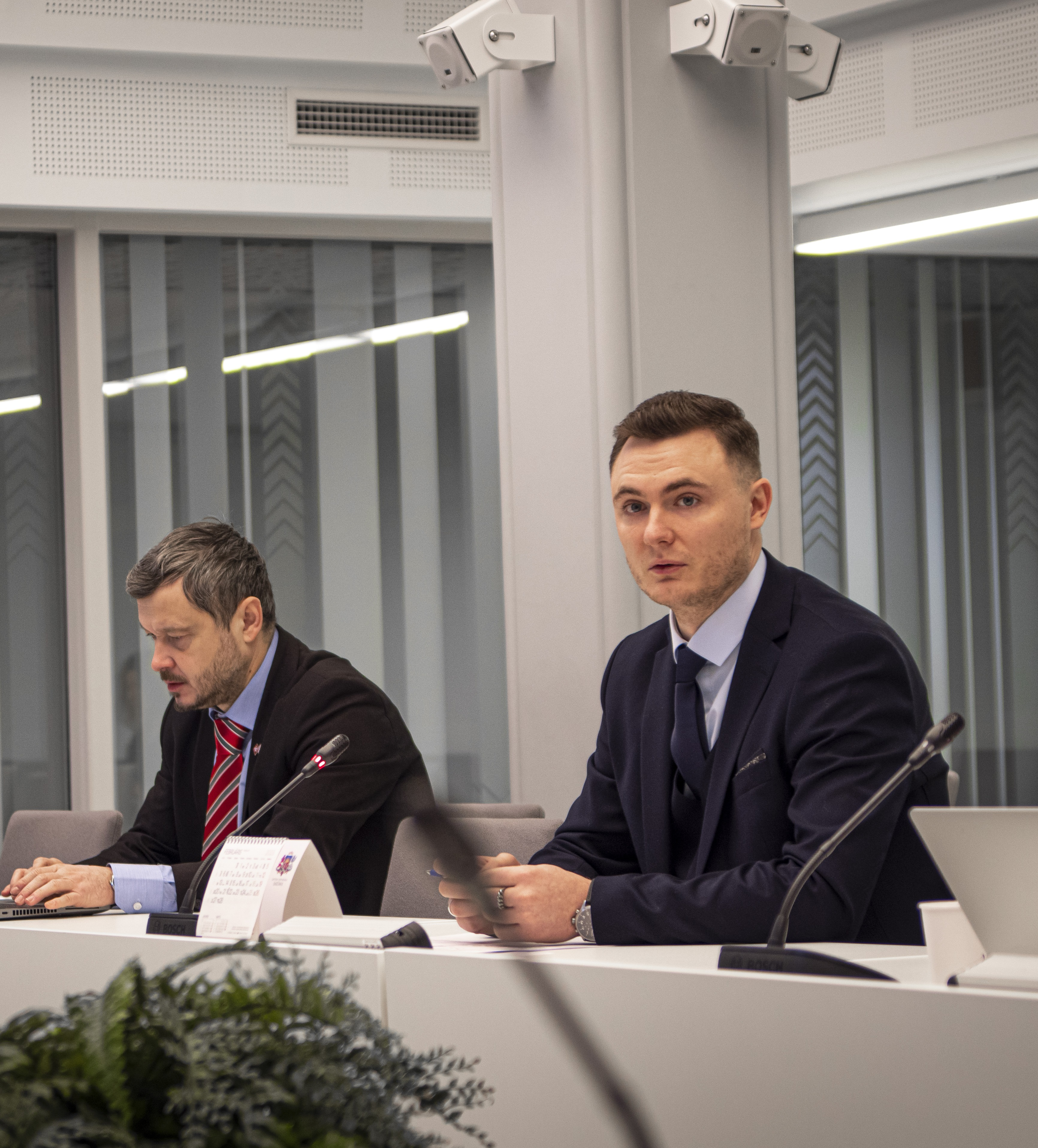
- Butāns in 2023

Member of the Saeima
- Incumbent
- Assumed office 1 November 2022
- Constituency: Courland

Personal details
- Born: 23 December 1992 (age 33)
- Party: National Alliance

Artūrs Butāns (born 23 December 1992) is a Latvian politician of the National Alliance who was elected member of the Saeima in 2022. He is the leader of the National Alliance in Liepāja.
