= Ingrīda Circene =

Latvian politician (born 1956)

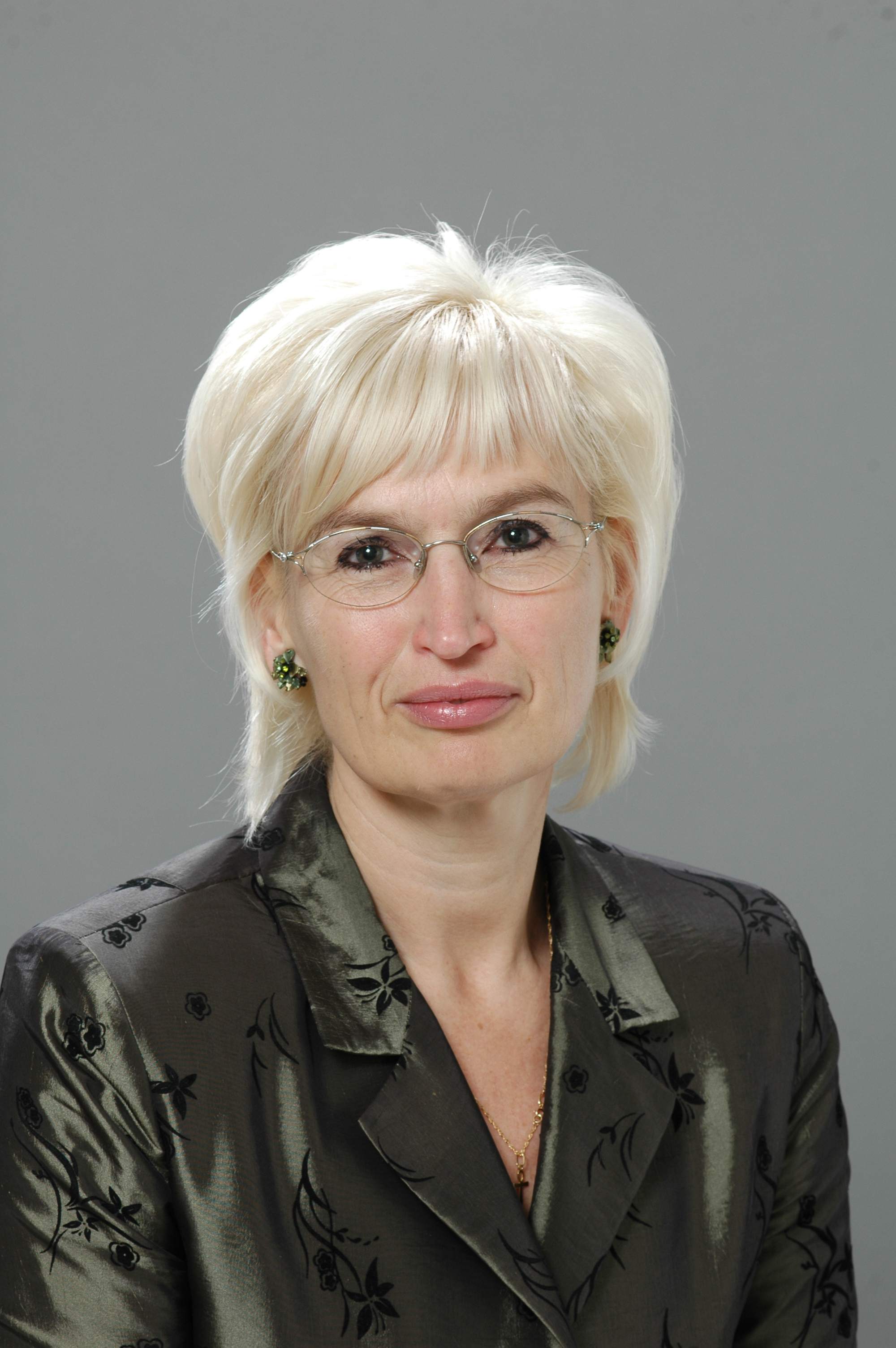

Minister for Health of Latvia
- In office 25 October 2011 – 14 July 2014
- Prime Minister: Valdis Dombrovskis; Laimdota Straujuma
- Preceded by: Juris Bārzdiņš
- Succeeded by: Guntis Belēvičs
- In office 10 April 2003 – 9 March 2004
- Prime Minister: Einars Repše
- Preceded by: Āris Auders
- Succeeded by: Rinalds Muciņš

Personal details
- Born: 6 December 1956 (age 69) Rīga, Latvian SSR
- Party: Unity (2011—)
- Other political affiliations: New Era Party (2002-2011)
- Education: Riga Medical Institute

Ingrīda Circene (born 6 December 1956 in Rīga) is a Latvian politician, who served as the Minister for Health of Latvia. She is a member of Unity.

Ingrīda Circene has been member of the Council of Aizpute. In 2002 she joined New Era Party and became a member of the 8th Saeima. After the resignation of Āris Auders, Circene became the Minister for Health of Latvia on 10 April 2003, being in office until government resignation on 9 March 2004. In 2006 and 2010 she became a member of respectively the 9th and 10th Saeima. Circene was appointed Minister for Health of Latvia on 25 October 2011. She resigned in 2014 due to political pressure.
