= Provisional Land Council of Latgale =

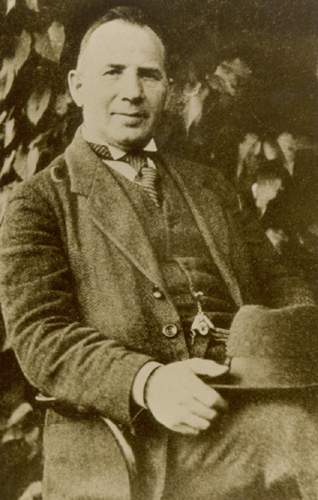
Chairman of the Council Francis Trasuns

Provisional Land Council of Latgale (Latgalian: Latgolas Pagaidu Zemes Padūme) was created on April 27, 1917, after the democratic February Revolution which ended the Russian Empire. The Council was crucial in achieving separation of Latvian inhabited lands of the former Inflanty Voivodeship from the Vitebsk Governorate and uniting them with the Baltic provinces of Courland and Vidzeme in the new state of Latvia.

On April 27, 1917, The First Congress of Latgale Latvians met in Rēzekne. 24 out of the 60 seats were allocated to the Polish, Jewish and Russian minorities. Francis Trasuns was elected the Chairman of the Council, but as he spent most of his time in the capital Petrograd, much of the daily business was overseen by Valērija Seile.

The Council met three times, on June 9, September 20 and November 26, 1917. Its goal was to assume full authority over the local government institutions, but it was not recognized by the Russian Provisional Government, which declined Council’s proposals for Latgale to be united with Vidzeme and to create a separate electoral district for Latgale.

After the Bolshevik Revolution, on December 3–4, 1917 Bolsheviks organized the Congress of the Latgalian Councils of Vitebsk Governorate. On December 14, 1917, the Bolshevik government of Soviet Russia ruled that Daugavpils, Ludza and Rēzekne counties should be separated from the Vitebsk Governorate and united with Vidzeme, which by then was under control of the Bolshevik Iskolat.

In February 1918, Latgale was occupied by the German Empire and on May 18, 1918 representatives of Daugavpils, Ludza and Rēzekne counties elected a new Central Land Council of Latgale. It met only once, in October 4–5, 1918 in Daugavpils.

On November 17, 1918, the newly created People's Council of Latvia decided to include 18 representatives from the Provisional Land Council in its ranks. On November 30, 1918, the Council ceased its existence and gave all its authority to the new Republic of Latvia.

== See also ==
- Provisional Land Council of Courland
- Provisional Land Council of Vidzeme
