= Ventspils county =

19th–20th century county in Latvia

Ventspils County: Ventspils apriņķis; Kreis Windau; Виндавскій уѣздъ
- County
- Location within Latvia in 1940
- Country: Russian Empire; Latvia
- Russian Governorate: Courland
- Established: 1819
- Abolished: 1949
- Capital: Ventspils

Area
  - Total: 3,126.59 km^{2} (1,207.18 sq mi)

Population (1897)
  - Total: 48,275
  - Density: 15.440/km^{2} (39.990/sq mi)

Ventspils county within the Courland Governorate

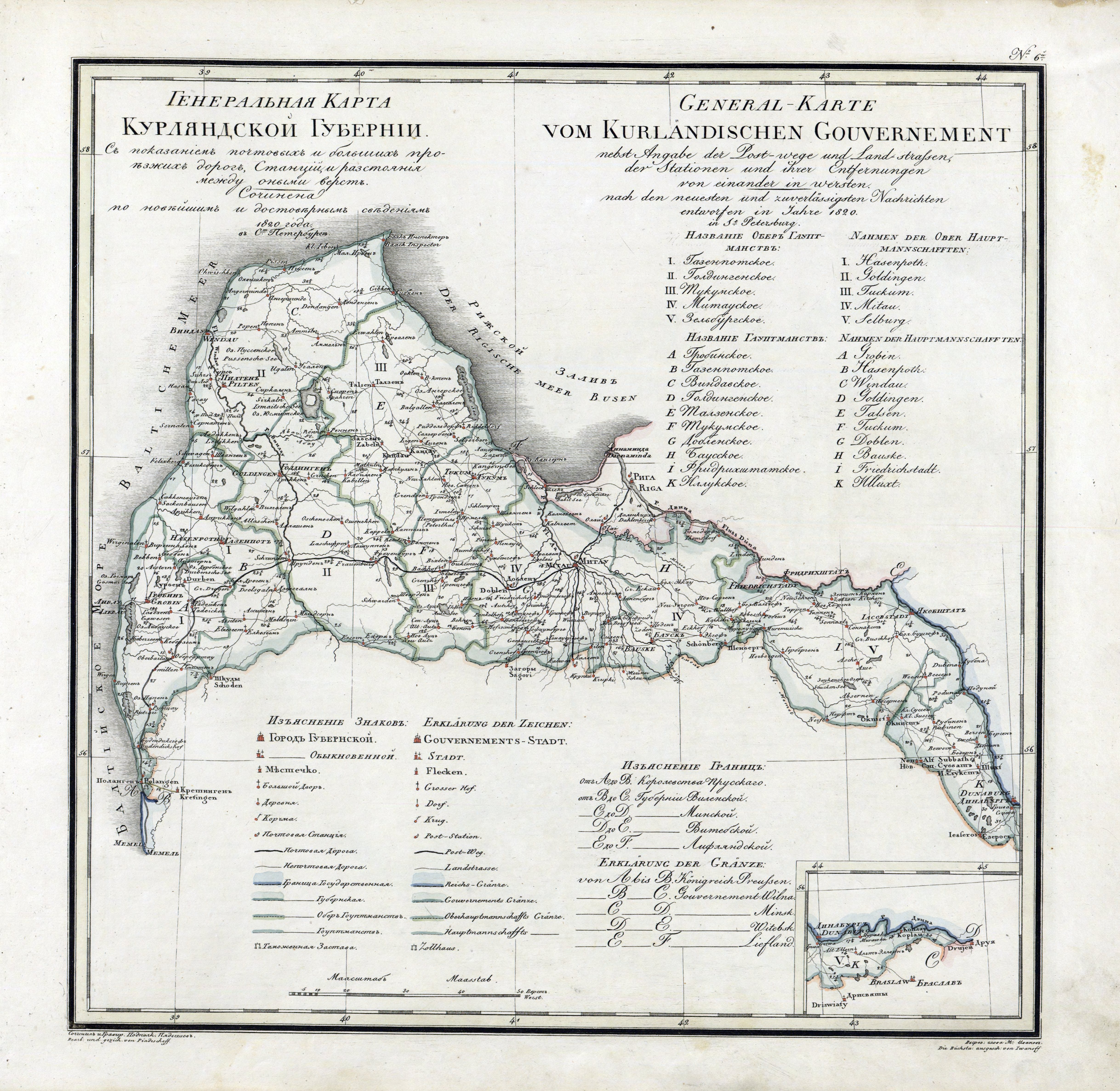
Windau County on the map of Courland Governorate (1820).

Ventspils county (Latvian: Ventspils apriņķis, German: Kreis Windau, Russian: Виндавскій уѣздъ, romanized: Vindavskiy uyezd) was a historic county of the Courland Governorate and of the Republic of Latvia. Its capital was Ventspils (Windau).

== History ==
Created from northern parts of the Duchy of Courland and Semigallia and District of Pilten after incorporation into the Russian Empire. In 1819, County of Ventspils (Kreis Windau) became one of the ten counties of the Courland Governorate.

After establishment of the Republic of Latvia in 1918, the Ventspils apriņķis existed until 1949, when the Council of Ministers of the Latvian SSR split it into the newly created districts (rajons) of Ventspils, Alsunga (dissolved in 1956) and Dundaga (dissolved in 1956).

== Demographics ==
At the time of the Russian Empire Census of 1897, Kreis Windau had a population of 48,275. Of these, 85.2% spoke Latvian, 7.9% German, 2.9% Yiddish, 2.8% Lithuanian or Livonian (Livonian-speakers were recorded in this census as Lithuanian-speakers), 0.6% Russian, 0.3% Estonian, 0.2% Romani, 0.1% Polish and 0.1% Ukrainian as their native language.
