= Courland Governorate =

1795–1918 unit of Russia

Coordinates: 56.6522°N 23.7244°E

Courland Governorate: Курля́ндская губе́рния (Russian); Kurzemes guberņa (Latvian); Kurländisches Gouvernement (German); Kurmō gubernāng (Livonian)
- Governorate of the Russian Empire
- 1795–1918
- Coat of arms

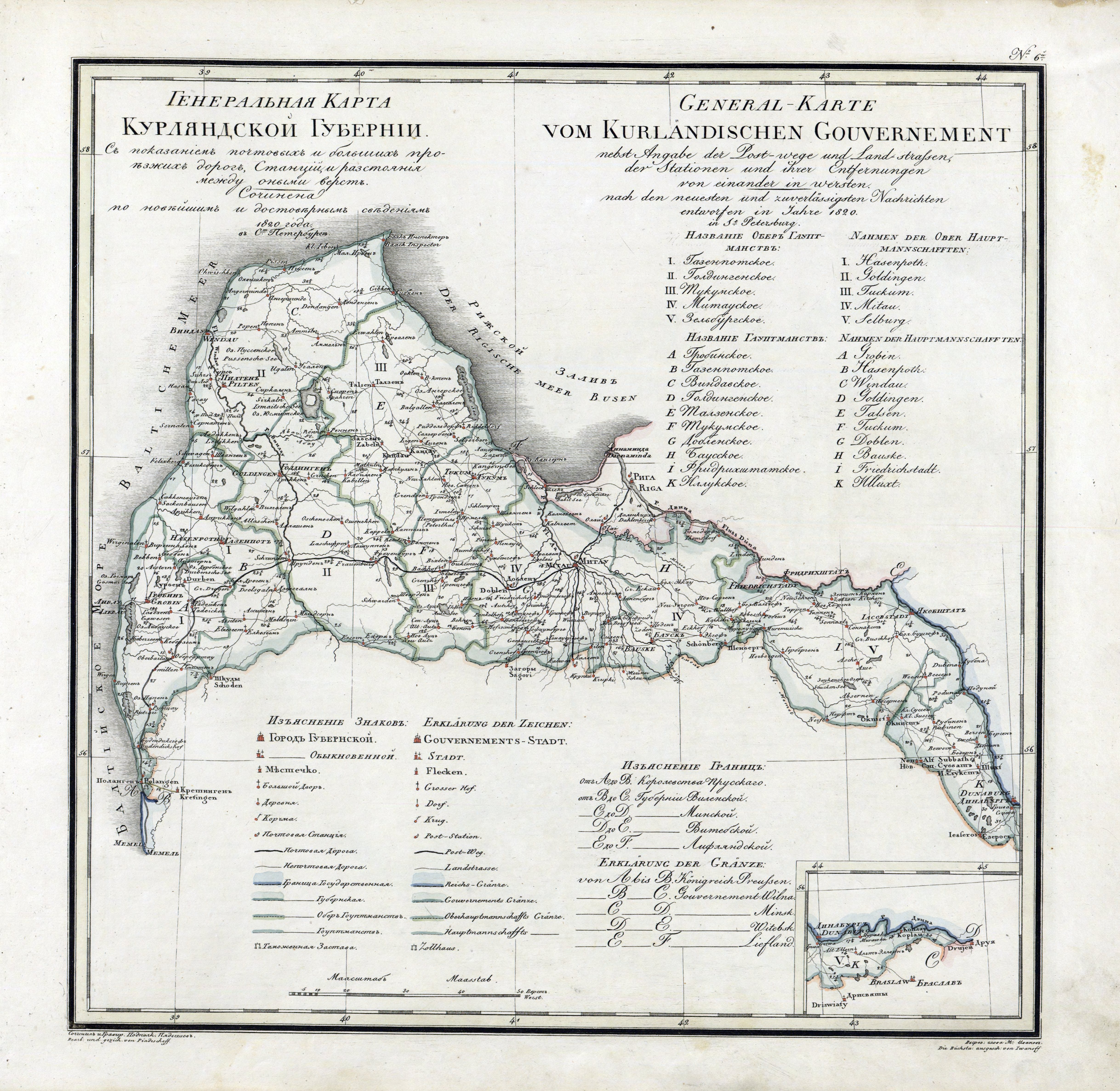
- Location in the Russian Empire; The Governorate in 1821 (Russian/German)
- Capital: Mitau
- Population
  - 1897: 674,034
- History
  - Third Partition of Poland: 28 March 1795
  - German occupation: 1918
  - Treaty of Brest-Litovsk: 1918
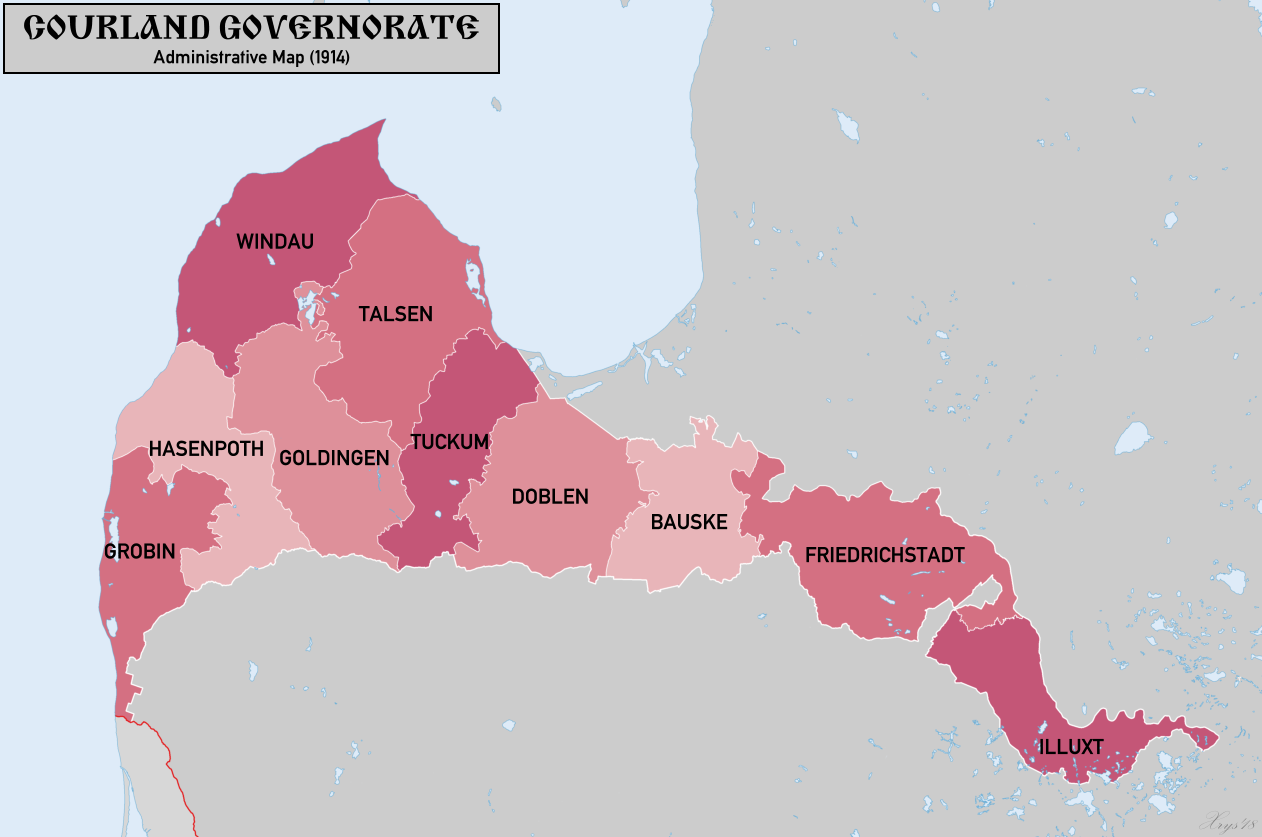
- Subdivisions or uyezds of Courland Governorate
- Political subdivisions: 10
Preceded by	Succeeded by
Duchy of Courland and Semigallia	Duchy of Courland and Semigallia (1918)
- Today part of: Latvia; Lithuania

The Courland Governorate, (Note: Russian: Курля́ндская губе́рния, romanized: Kurlyándskaya gubérniya; German: Kurländisches Gouvernement; Latvian: Kurzemes guberņa; Lithuanian: Kuršo gubernija; Estonian: Kuramaa kubermang; Livonian: Kurmō gubernāng) initially organized in 1795–1796 as the Courland Viceroyalty , was a province (guberniya) and one of the Baltic governorates of the Russian Empire. Its territory corresponded to the historical regions of Kurzeme, Zemgale and Sēlija in modern-day Latvia, as well as the coastal strip of Palanga in modern Lithuania.

The governorate was created in 1795 following the Third Partition of the Polish–Lithuanian Commonwealth, when the Duchy of Courland and Semigallia was incorporated into the Russian Empire. Like the neighbouring Baltic provinces, Courland retained regional administrative autonomy managed by the local Baltic German nobility through the Courland Landtag, and serfdom was abolished in 1817. In 1915, during World War I, the province was occupied by the German Army under Ober Ost. Russian rule formally ended with the Treaty of Brest-Litovsk in March 1918, and the territory became part of the independent Republic of Latvia in November 1918.

== History ==
The governorate was created in 1795 out of the territory of the Duchy of Courland and Semigallia, which was incorporated into the Russian Empire as the Viceroyalty of Courland with its capital at Mitau (now Jelgava) following the third partition of the Polish–Lithuanian Commonwealth. In 1796, the viceroyalty was reconstituted as the Courland Governorate.

In 1915, during World War I, Courland was occupied by the German Empire and incorporated into the Ober Ost military administration. While the local Baltic German nobility cooperated with the German administration, several Latvian leaders from Courland retreated to the neighboring governorates of Livonia and Estonia, which remained under Russian control. After the February Revolution in March 1917, those Latvian leaders formed the Provisional Land Council of Courland, which met on 27 April 1917 in Tartu and was recognized by the Russian Provisional Government as the representative body of the occupied Courland Governorate. At the same time, the Provisional Government in Petrograd appointed Latvian politician Jānis Čakste as the commissar of Courland. Since Courland remained under German occupation, Čakste and the Land Council focused on assisting war refugees who had fled to Livonia and Estonia.

In September–October 1917, German forces advanced from Courland, capturing Riga and the West Estonian islands. Following the October Revolution in Petrograd, the Latvian Provisional National Council convened in Valka on 29 November [O.S. 16 November] 1917, proclaiming Latvian autonomy within ethnographic borders that included Courland. On 15 January 1918, the council declared Latvia an independent republic.

In February 1918, German forces advanced across the remaining Baltic lands. Under the Treaty of Brest-Litovsk on 3 March 1918, Soviet Russia formally renounced its claims to Courland. On 8 March 1918, local Baltic German representatives met in Jelgava and proclaimed the Duchy of Courland and Semigallia, offering the ducal crown to German Emperor Wilhelm II. On 15 March, Germany recognized the client state. On 5 November 1918, Courland was nominally incorporated into the United Baltic Duchy. This project collapsed with Germany's armistice, and on 18 November 1918, the Republic of Latvia was proclaimed, uniting all Latvian lands including Courland.

== Geography ==
The governorate was bounded in the north by the Baltic Sea, the Gulf of Riga and the Livonia Governorate; to the west by the Baltic Sea; to the south by the Kovno Governorate and East Prussia; and to the east by the Vitebsk Governorate. The population in 1846 was estimated at 553,300.

It was situated between 55°41' and 57°45 1/2' N. Of its total border of 1,260 versts (1,344 km), the sea coast accounted for 320 versts (341 km). The border with Prussia was only 6 versts (6.4 km) long. The total surface area of the province was 26,112 square versts (29,716 km^{2}).

== Subdivisions ==
Following its incorporation into the Russian Empire, the governorate united the lands of the Duchy of Courland and Semigallia and the District of Pilten.

Under the administrative reform of 1819, the Pilten district was reorganized into the districts of Windau (Hauptmannschaft Windau) and Hasenpoth (Hauptmannschaft Hasenpoth). The coastal area of Palanga up to the Prussian border was also transferred to the Courland Governorate from the Vilna Governorate. The province was divided into ten districts (Hauptmannschaften or uezds). Every two districts formed an Oberhauptmannschaft for regional judicial and ecclesiastical administration.

The ten counties of the governorate were:

County		Administrative centre		Arms of County Town	Area	Population (1897 census)
Name in German	Name in Russian	Town	Town pop. (1897)	Arms of County Town	Area	Population (1897 census)
Bauske	Баускій	Bauske (Bausk)	6,544		2,097.4 km^{2} (809.8 sq mi)	50,547
Windau	Виндавскій	Windau (Vindau)	7,127		3,136.4 km^{2} (1,211.0 sq mi)	48,275
Hasenpoth	Газенпотскій	Hasenpoth (Gazenpot)	3,340		2,506 km^{2} (968 sq mi)	53,209
Goldingen	Гольдингенскій	Goldingen	9,720		3,276.4 km^{2} (1,265.0 sq mi)	66,335
Grobin	Гробинскій	Grobin	1,490		4,685.4 km^{2} (1,809.0 sq mi)	110,878
Grobin	Гробинскій	Libau (Liepāja)	64,489		4,685.4 km^{2} (1,809.0 sq mi)	110,878
Illuxt	Иллукстскій	Illuxt	3,652		2,249.7 km^{2} (868.6 sq mi)	66,461
Doblen	Митавскій (Добленскій)	Mitau (Jelgava)	35,131		2,847.2 km^{2} (1,099.3 sq mi)	101,310
Talsen	Тальсенскій	Talsen	4,200		3,151.1 km^{2} (1,216.6 sq mi)	61,148
Tuckum	Туккумскій	Tuckum	7,555		2,262.6 km^{2} (873.6 sq mi)	51,076
Friedrichstadt	Фридрихштадтскій	Friedrichstadt	5,175		3,504.2 km^{2} (1,353.0 sq mi)	64,795
Friedrichstadt	Фридрихштадтскій	Jakobstadt (Jēkabpils)	5,829		3,504.2 km^{2} (1,353.0 sq mi)	64,795

== Law ==
The judicial hierarchy consisted of the Court of Appeal of Courland (Kurländisches Oberhofgericht), followed by the Higher Hauptmann Courts (Oberhauptmannsgericht), the Hauptmann Courts (Hauptmannsgericht), the county courts (Kreisgericht) for the peasantry, and parish courts (Gemeindegericht) at the local level.

== Administration ==
The province of Courland was administered by a governor appointed by the Russian emperor. Local self-government of the nobility was centered in the Landtag (Kurländischer Landtag), composed of parish delegates (Konvokanten). The executive body was a noble committee headed by a land representative (Landesbevollmächtigter).

The governor's residence was in Mitau Castle. During periods when the Baltic Governorate-General existed (1801–1876 and 1906–1909), the governors of Courland were subordinate to the governor-general in Riga.

Until the period of Russification in the late 19th century, the official administrative language of higher authorities and courts was German, while parish courts also kept records in Latvian.

=== Governors ===
- 1795–1796 Baron Peter Ludwig von der Pahlen (governor-general)
- 1796–1798 Count Gustav Matthias Jakob von der Wenge genannt Lambsdorff
- 1798–1800 Baron Wilhelm Carl Heinrich von der Oest genannt Driesen
- 1800–1808 Nikolay Ivanovich Arsenyev
- 1808–1811 Baron Jan Willem Hogguer
- 1811–1816 Count Friedrich Wilhelm von Sivers
- 1816–1824 Emannuel von Stanecke
- 1824–1827 Paul Theodor von Hahn
- 1827–1853 Christoph Engelbrecht von Brevern
- 1853–1858 Pyotr Aleksandrovich Valuyev
- 1858–1868 Johann von Brevern
- 1868–1885 Paul Frommhold Ignatius von Lilienfeld-Toal
- 1885 Aleksandr Alekseyevich Manyos
- 1885–1888 Konstantin Ivanovich Pashchenko
- 1888–1891 Dmitry Sergeyevich Sipyagin
- 1891–1905 Dmitry Dmitriyevich Sverbeyev
- 1905–1906 Woldemar Alexander Valerian von Boeckmann
- 1906–1910 Leonid Mikhailovich Knyazev
- 1910 Nikolay Dmitriyevich Kropotkin
- 1910–1915 Sergey Dimitriyevich Nabokov
- 1915–1917 Pyotr Vasilyevich Gendrikov, Vladimir Tatishchev, Boris Strakhov (in exile during German occupation)

== Economy ==
In the 19th century, the province was predominantly agrarian. Serfdom was abolished in 1817, granting peasants personal freedom, though land remained the property of noble estates. In 1863, peasants were granted the legal right to purchase land. The primary crops were rye, wheat, barley, peas, oats, and potatoes.

Industrial development centered around manufacturing and processing. By 1912, there were approximately 200 factories (sawmills, tanneries, distilleries, and flax mills). Major railway lines included the Riga–Mitau line (opened in 1867) and the Libau–Romny Railway (built in 1871–1876), connecting the ice-free port of Libau with the Ukrainian and central Russian provinces.

== Language ==
Linguistic composition of the Courland Governorate according to the 1897 census:

Linguistic composition in 1897
Language	Number	Percentage (%)	Males	Females
Latvian	507,511	75.29	240,672	266,839
German	51,017	7.56	23,372	27,645
Jewish (Yiddish)	37,689	5.59	18,137	19,552
Russian (Great Russian)	25,630	3.80	16,319	9,311
Polish	19,688	2.92	9,985	9,703
Lithuanian	16,531	2.45	8,833	7,698
Belarusian (White Russian)	12,283	1.82	6,356	5,927
Romani	1,202	0.17	581	621
Others	2,483	0.40	1,997	486
Total	674,034	100.00	326,252	347,782

== See also ==
- Baltic governorates
- Estonia Governorate
- Livonia Governorate
- Duchy of Courland and Semigallia

== Sources ==
- Baumgart, Winfried (1966). Deutsche Ostpolitik 1918: Von Brest-Litovsk bis zum Ende des Ersten Weltkrieges. Wien: Oldenbourg.
- Hiden, John (1987). The Baltic States and Weimar Ostpolitik. Cambridge: Cambridge University Press. ISBN 978-0-521-89325-1.
- Michaelis, Herbert (1959). Ursachen und Folgen: Vom deutschen Zusammenbruch 1918 und 1945 bis zur staatlichen Neuordnung Deutschlands in der Gegenwart. Vol. 2. Berlin: Dokumenten-Verlag.
- O'Connor, Kevin (2003). The History of the Baltic States. Westport: Greenwood Press. ISBN 978-0-313-32355-3.
- Plakans, Andrejs (2011). A Concise History of the Baltic States. Cambridge University Press. ISBN 978-0-521-83372-1.
- Sukiennicki, Wiktor (1984). East Central Europe During World War I: From Foreign Domination to National Independence. Boulder: East European Monographs. ISBN 978-0-88033-012-1.
- Thaden, Edward C. (2014). Russia's Western Borderlands, 1710–1870. Princeton University Press. ISBN 978-1-4008-5495-0.
