= Jaunjelgava county =

19th–20th century county in Latvia

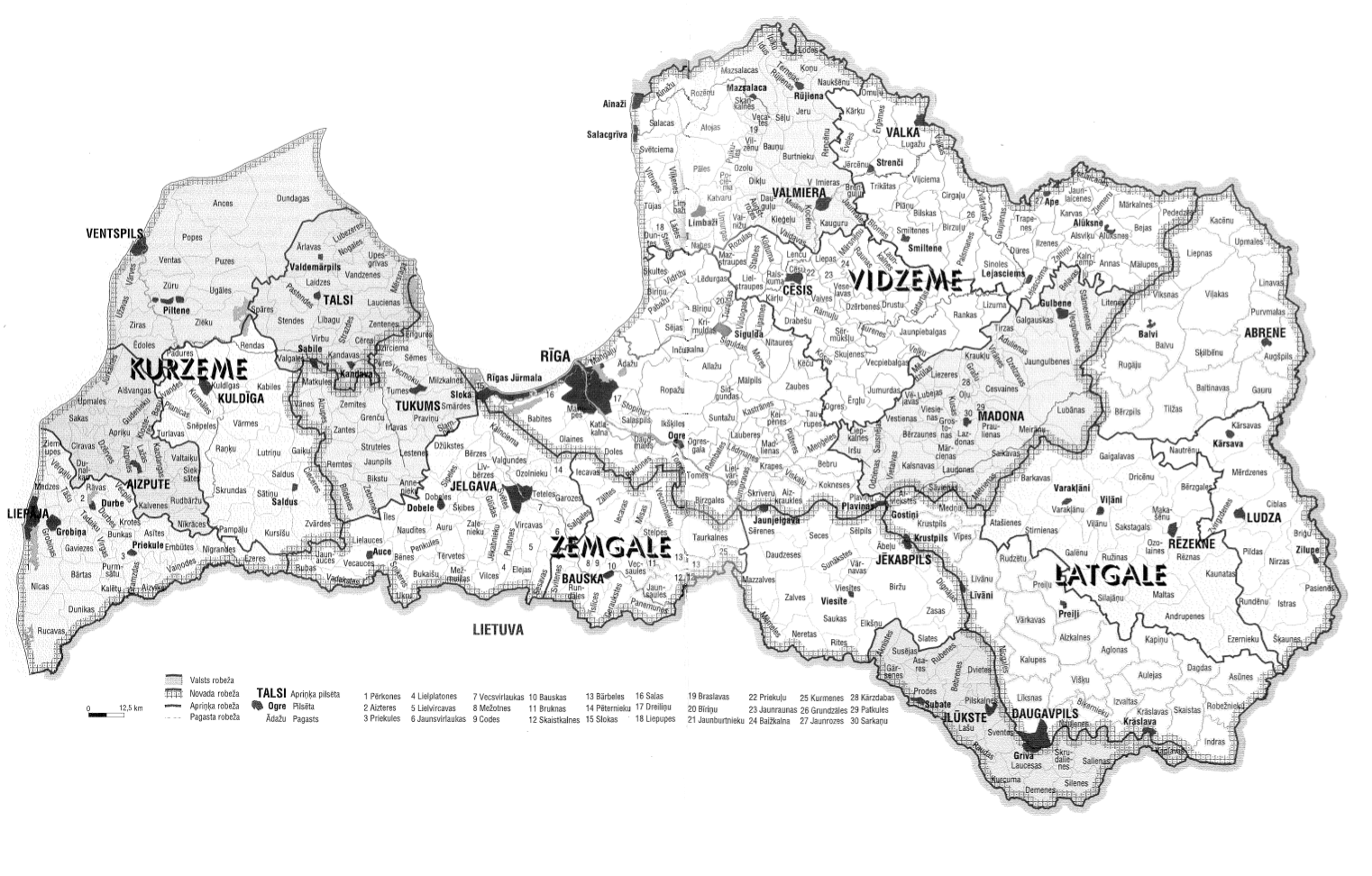
Jēkabpils apriņķis (former Jaunjelgavas apriņķis) on the map of Latvia (1938).

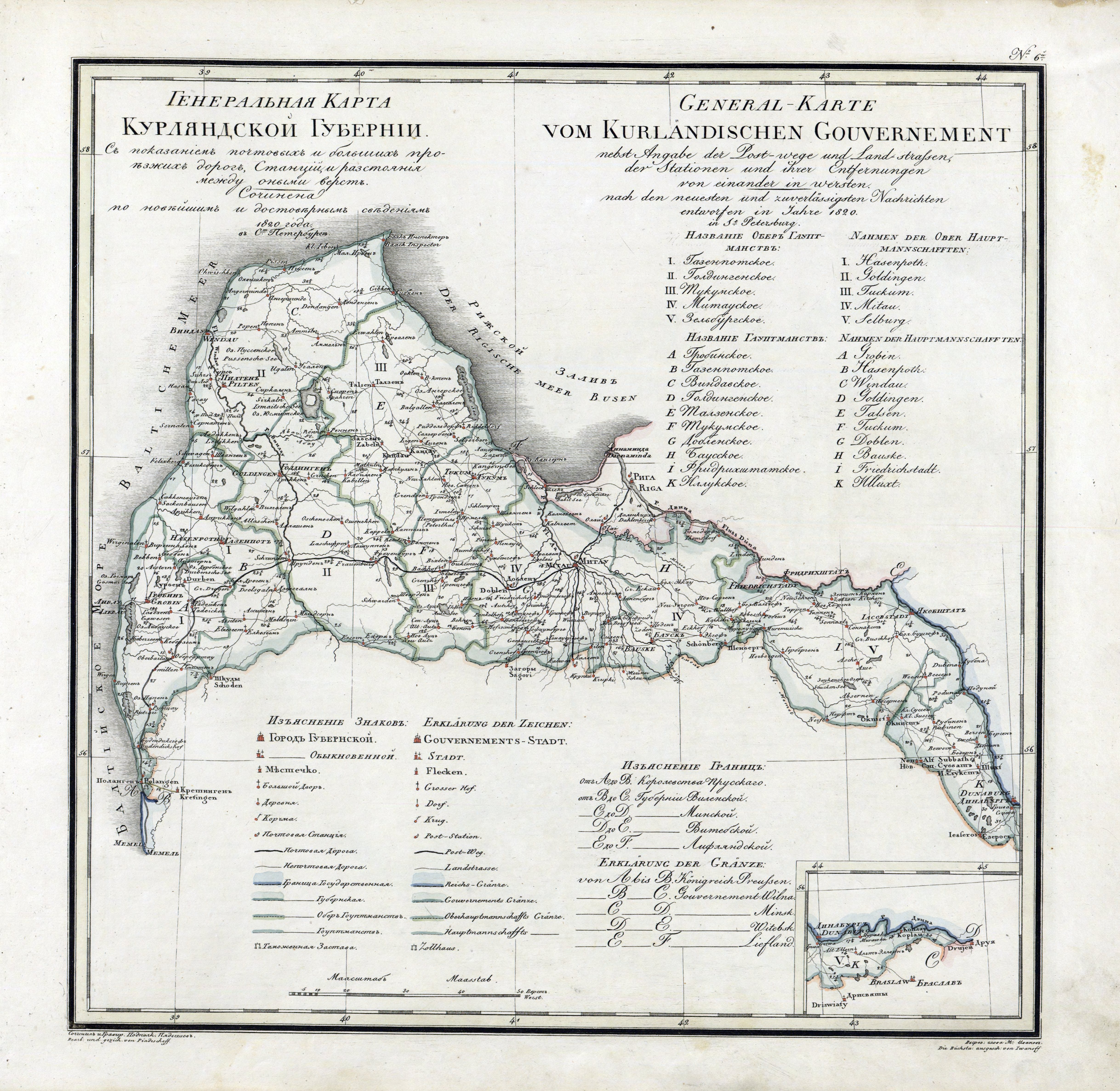
Friedrichstadt County on the map of Courland Governorate (1820).

Jaunjelgava county (Latvian: Jaunjelgavas apriņķis, German: Kreis Friedrichstadt, Russian: Фридрихштадтский уезд) was a historic county of the Courland Governorate and of the Republic of Latvia. Its capital was Jaunjelgava (Friedrichstadt).

== History ==
Initially, the Captaincy of Friedrichstadt (German: Hauptmannschaft Friedrichstadt) was as a subdivision of the Duchy of Courland and Semigallia. In 1795, the Duchy was incorporated into the Russian Empire, and in 1819 Friedrichstadt County (Kreis Friedrichstadt) became one of the ten counties of the Courland Governorate.

After the establishment of the Republic of Latvia in 1918, the Jaunjelgavas apriņķis existed until 1924, when it was renamed to Jēkabpils apriņķis.

== Demographics ==
At the time of the Russian Empire Census of 1897, Kreis Friedrichstadt had a population of 64,795. Of these, 83.0% spoke Latvian, 9.3% Yiddish, 2.8% German, 2.6% Russian, 1.2% Lithuanian, 0.8% Polish, 0.2% Romani and 0.1% Belarusian as their native language.
