= Provisional Land Council of Vidzeme =

Provisional Land Council of Vidzeme (Latvian: Vidzemes Pagaidu zemes padome, Russian: Временный земский совет Лифляндской губернии) was created in the Governorate of Livonia on March 13, 1917 following the dissolution of the Russian Empire in the February Revolution. Initially it supported ideas of Latvian land unity and self-determination, but by the second half of 1917 it came under increasing Bolshevik influence and on January 2, 1918 it ceased to exist, relinquishing its authority to the Bolshevik Iskolat.

On March 12–13, 1917 the Congress of Livonia Governorate was held in Valmiera, attended by representatives from the Latvian inhabited regions. On March 30, 1917 the Russian Provisional Government allowed Estonian inhabited regions of Livonia to unite with the Governorate of Estonia.

Meanwhile, in Riga the power was controlled by the left-wing Council of workers. In order to bypass the liberal Provisional Land Council in April Bolsheviks organized the First Vidzeme Congress of Landless Peasants which created the Council of Landless Peasants. After some negotiations it was agreed that both Councils will merge on April 23, 1917. The new Council was dominated by the leftists.

In July 1917 the Council convened autonomy Congress during which it was proclaimed that Latvian nation, just like all other nations, has the rights to complete self-determination.

During the August 20 elections Social Democrats won 24, Latvian Farmers' Union 15 and Latvia’s Revolutionary socialist party 1 mandate. On October 10 Farmers Union left the Council, which ended its work on January 2, 1918 and gave all its authority to the Iskolat.

== See also ==
- Provisional Land Council of Courland
- Provisional Land Council of Latgale
