= Provisional Land Council of Courland =

Representative organ of Courland Governorate, Latvia

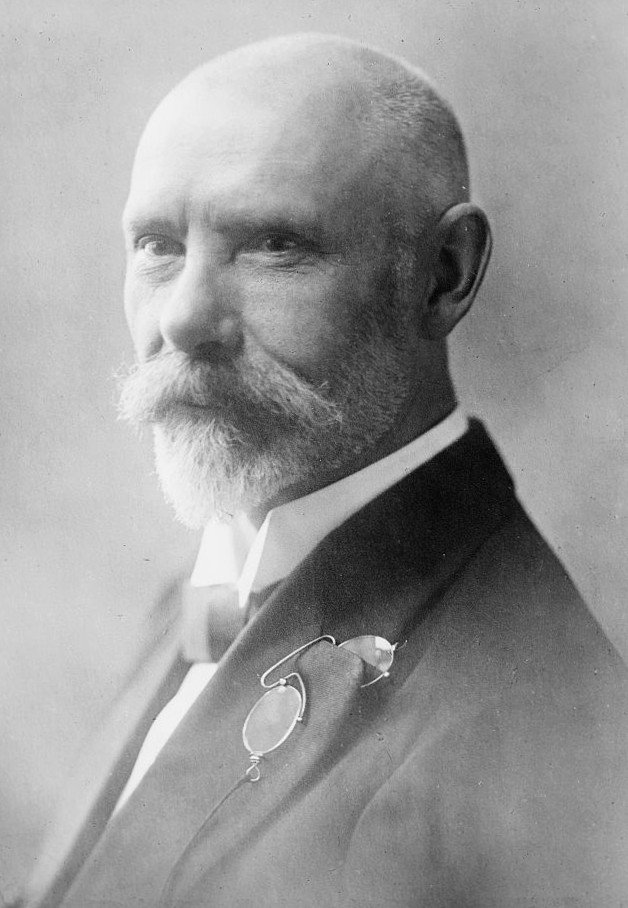
Jānis Čakste

Provisional Land Council of Courland (Latvian: Kurzemes Pagaidu zemes padome; Russian: Временный земский совет Курляндской губернии) was created on 27 April 1917 in Tartu as the representative organ of Courland Governorate.

Because Courland was under German military occupation since the summer of 1915, the Council was created in Estonian city of Tartu, and following the German offensive, was evacuated to Russian city Kazan in October 1917.

After the democratic February Revolution in the Russian Empire, approximately 170 000 war refugees and soldiers from Courland elected 313 representatives, who then proceeded to elect the Provisional Land Council with 60 members. Their leader was the future President of Latvia Jānis Čakste, who was appointed by the Russian Provisional Government to be the Commissar of Courland, replacing the old czarist post of Governor of Courland.

The Council organized assistance to war refugees from Courland, as well as supported the idea of a united Latvian state and participated in the Provisional Latvian National Council.

== See also ==
- Provisional Land Council of Vidzeme
- Provisional Land Council of Latgale
