= Janīna Kursīte-Pakule =

Latvian politician

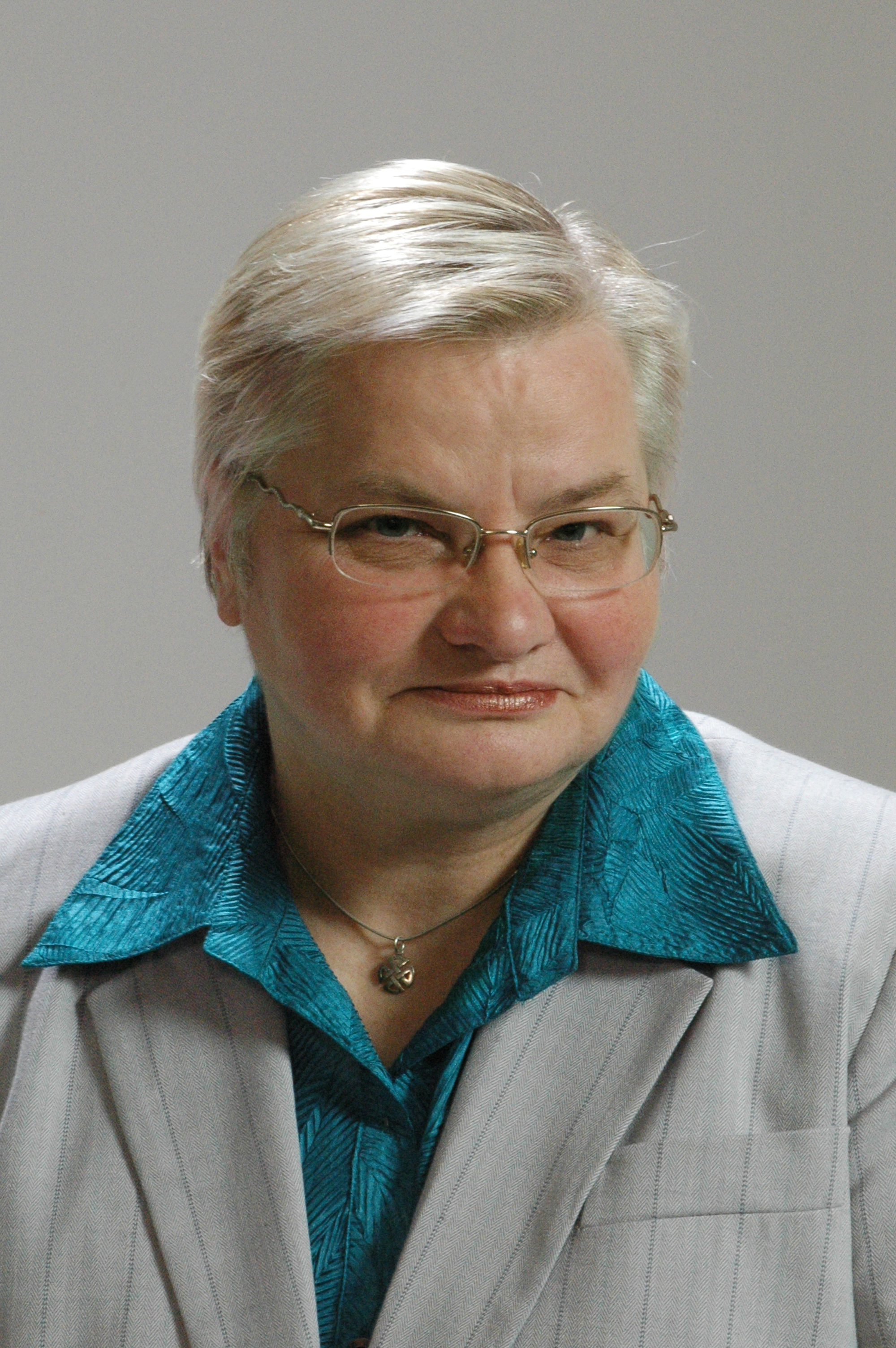

Deputy of the Saeima

Personal details
- Born: 2 March 1952 (age 74) Arendole, Latvian SSR (now Latvia)
- Party: 2006–2008 For Fatherland and Freedom/LNNK; 2008–2011 Civic Union; 2011–2014 Unity; 2014–present National Alliance
- Education: University of Tartu, University of Latvia

Janīna Kursīte-Pakule (born 2 March 1952, in Arendole) is a Latvian literary scholar, linguist, writer, publicist, and politician. She has served as deputy of the 9th, 10th, 11th, and 12th Saeimas. Kursīte-Pakule is a member of the Latvian Academy of Sciences.

In 2018, after being re-elected to the Saeima, Kursīte-Pakule delivered her oath in Livonian before being asked to retake it in Latvian, which she did in the Livonian dialect of Latvian.
