= Juris Bārzdiņš =

Latvian politician (born 1966)

Juris Bārzdiņš (born 21 July 1966) is a Latvian politician, member of the Union of Greens and Farmers party and the former Minister of Health of Latvia serving from 3 November 2010 to 25 October 2011.

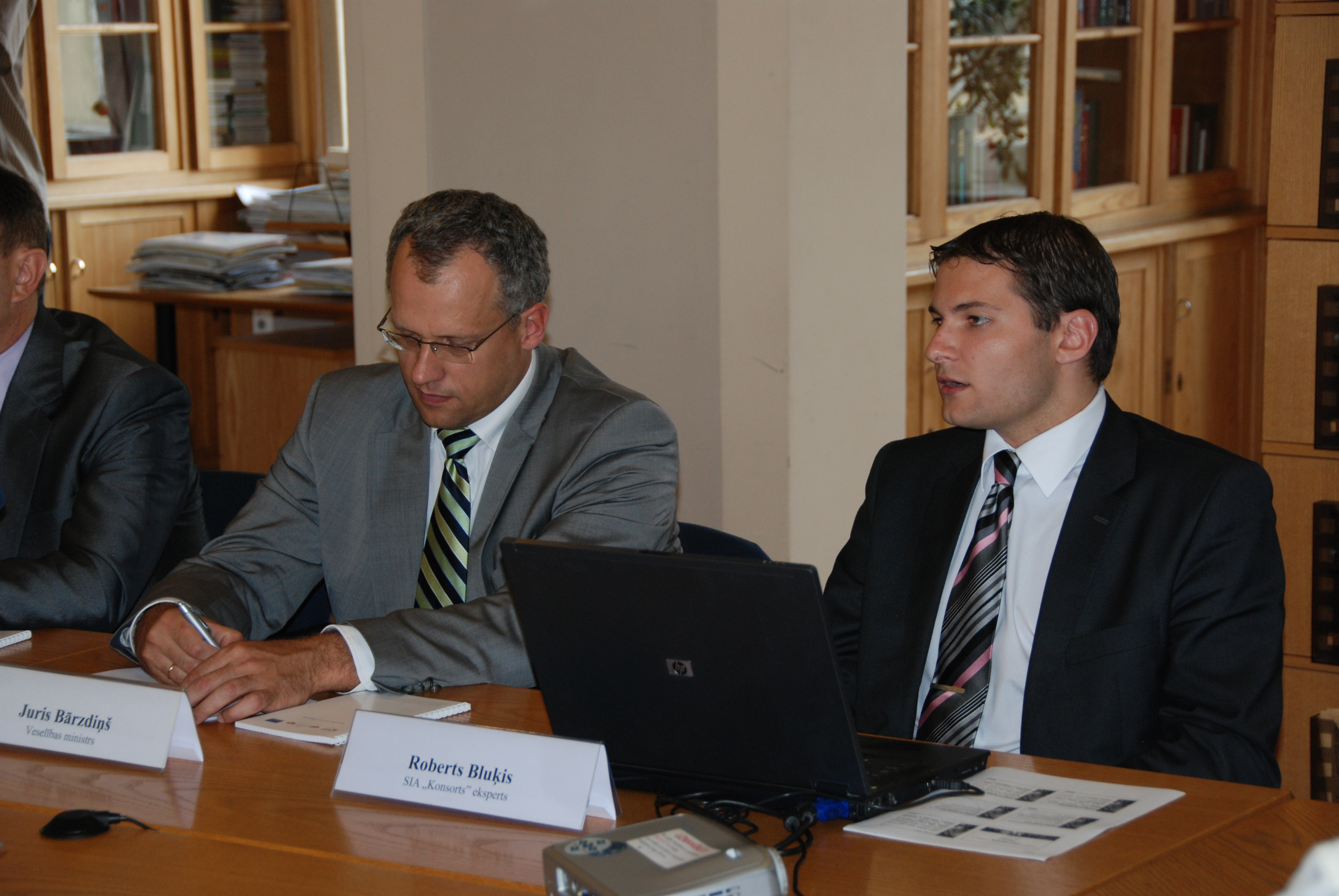
Bārzdiņš (left) in Latvia 2011
