= Talsi county =

17th–20th century county in Latvia

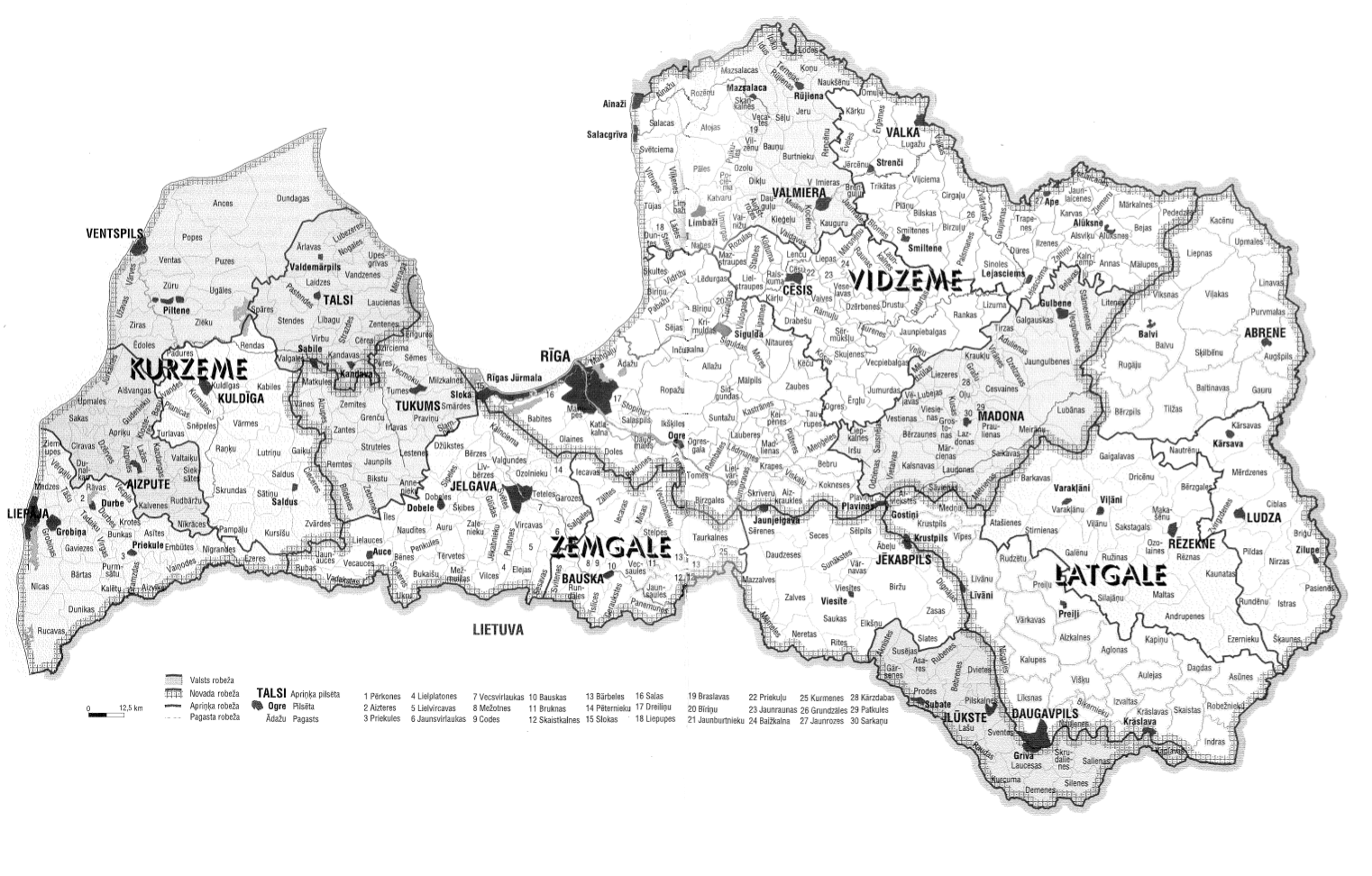
Talsu apriņķis on the map of Latvia (1938).

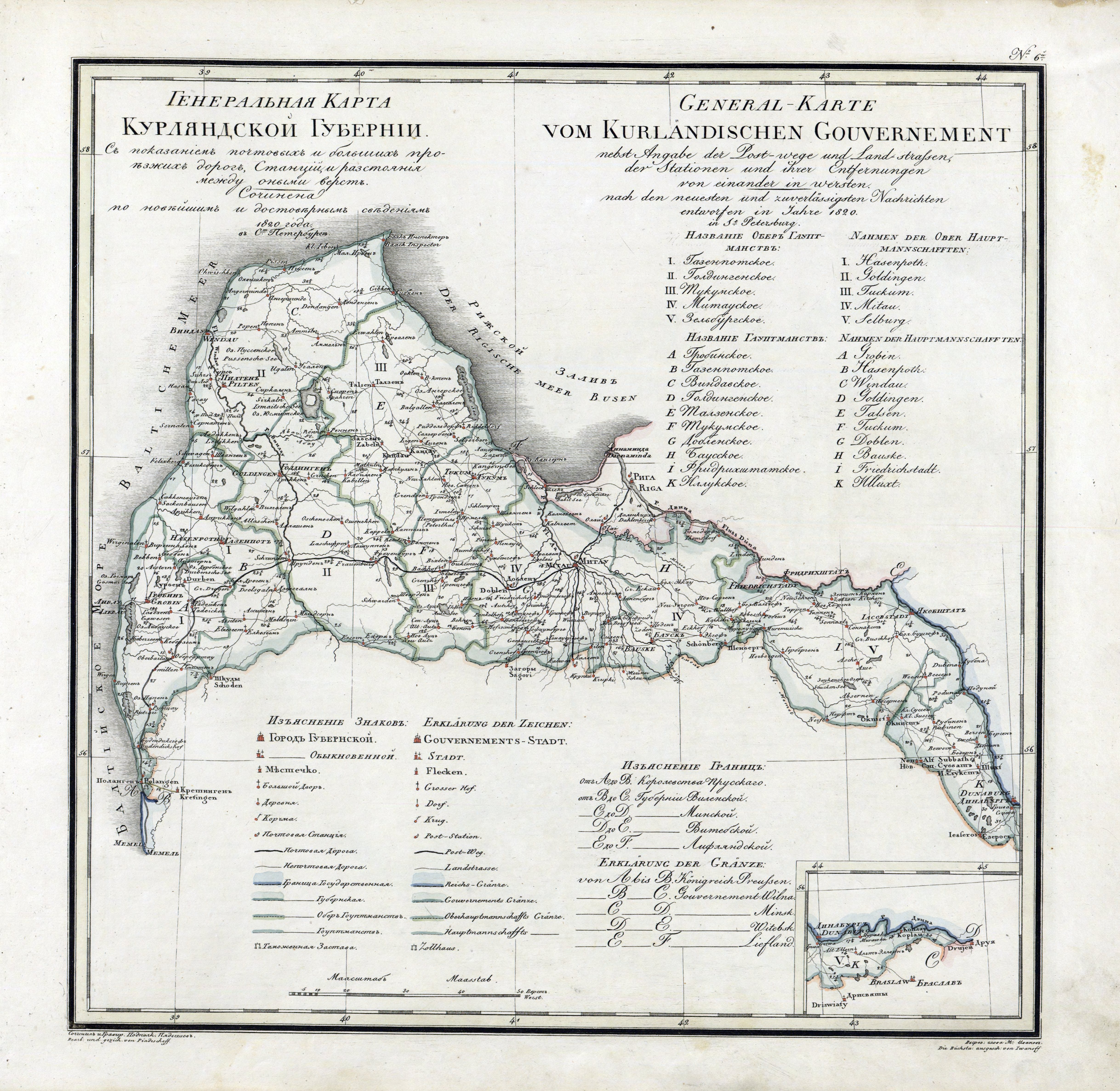
Talsen County on the map of Courland Governorate (1820).

Talsi county (Latvian: Talsu apriņķis, German: Kreis Talsen, Russian: Тальсенский уезд) was a historic county of the Courland Governorate and of the Republic of Latvia. Its capital was Talsi (Talsen).

== History ==
The county was founded in 1617 as the Captaincy of Kandava (German: Hauptmannschaft Candau) of the Duchy of Courland and Semigallia. In 1795, the Duchy was incorporated into the Russian Empire. In 1819, the Captaincy of Kandava was renamed to County of Talsi (Kreis Talsen) and became one of the ten counties of the Courland Governorate.

After establishment of the Republic of Latvia in 1918, the Talsu apriņķis existed until 1949, when the Council of Ministers of the Latvian SSR split it into the newly created districts (rajons) of Talsi, Dundaga (dissolved in 1956) and Kandava (dissolved in 1959).

== Demographics ==
At the time of the Russian Empire Census of 1897, Kreis Talsen had a population of 61,148. Of these, 88.8% spoke Latvian, 6.3% Yiddish, 4.2% German, 0.3% Russian, 0.3% Romani and 0.1% Polish as their native language.
