= Aija Barča =

Latvian politician

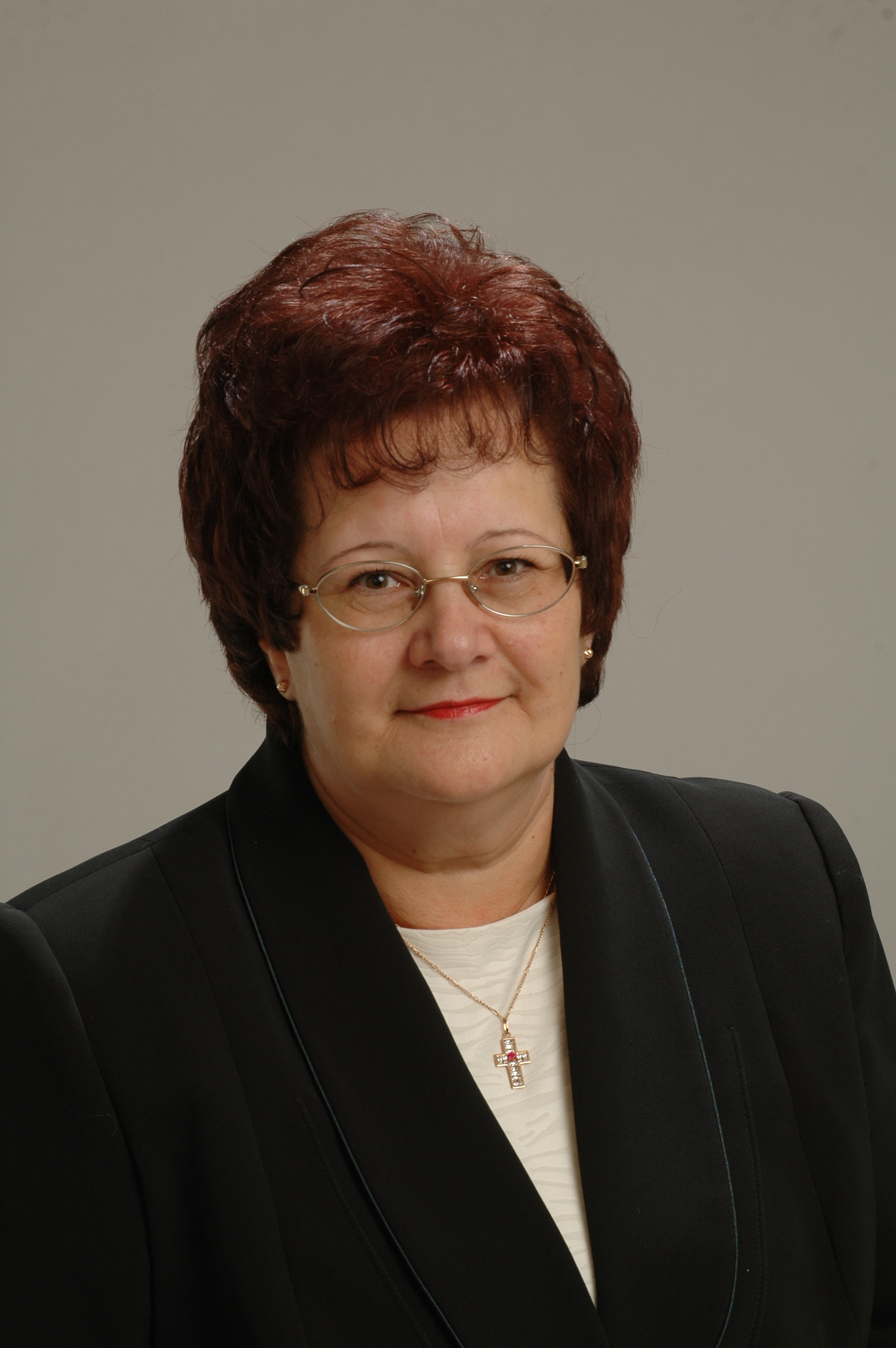
Aija Barča

Aija Barča (born 26 October 1949) is a Latvian pedagogue and politician and a Deputy of the Saeima in 1998-2002 and since 2006. She was elected from the social democratic list in the 7th Saeima, from People's Party in the 9th and from the Union of Greens and Farmers in the 10th and 11th.
