= Jānis Lagzdiņš =

Latvian politician

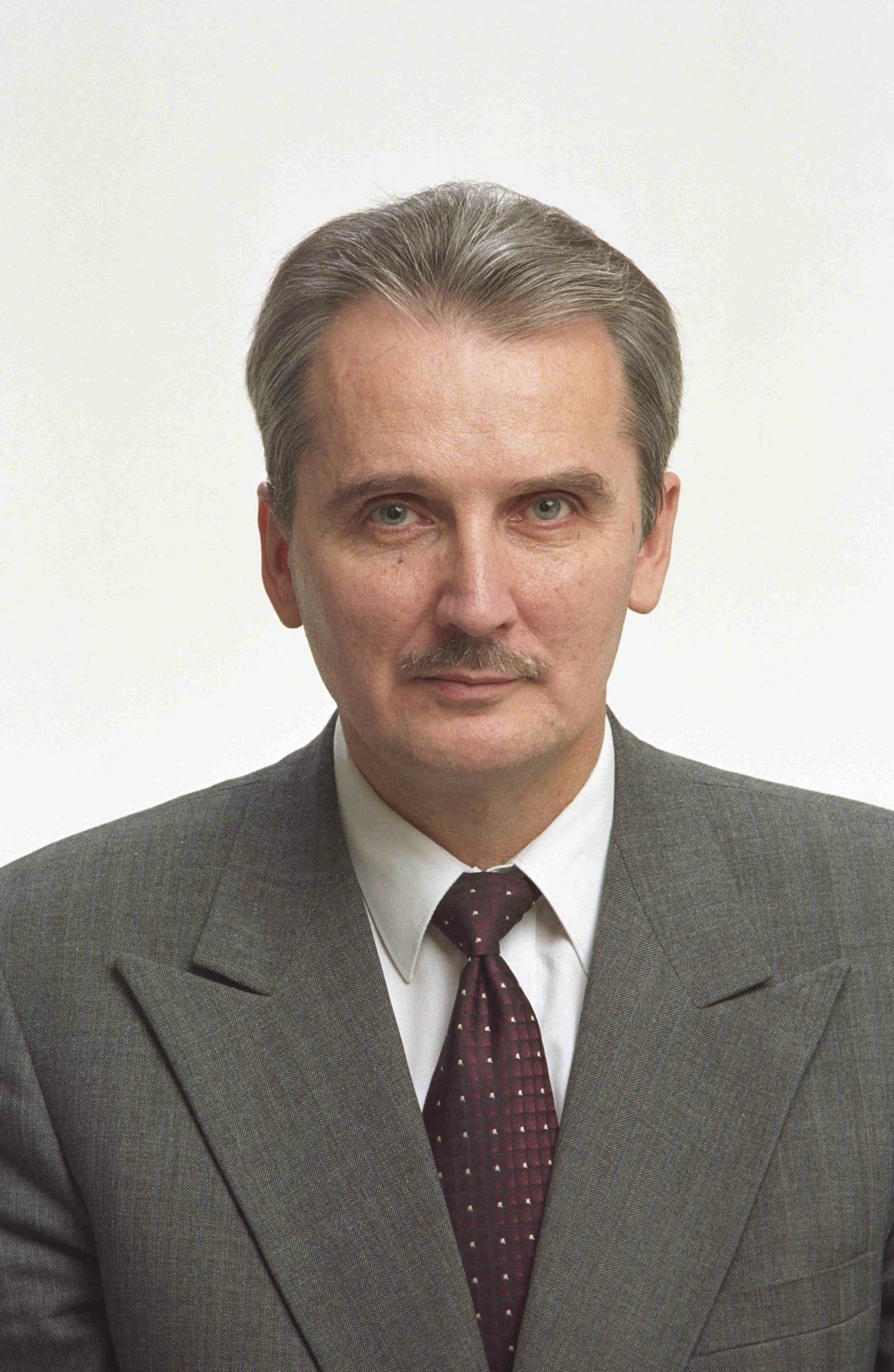
- Jānis Lagzdiņš in 2010

Deputy of the Saeima
- In office July 6, 1993 – November 2, 2010

Member of the Supreme Council of Latvia
- In office 1990 – 1993

Personal details
- Born: June 15, 1952 (age 74) Liepāja, Latvian SSR, Soviet Union
- Party: People's Party (1998-2010)
- Other political affiliations: Latvian Way (1993-1998)
- Education: Pēteris Stučka Latvian State University (1983)
- Profession: Jurist

Jānis Lagzdiņš (born 15 June 1952, Liepāja) is a Latvian politician. He is a former Deputy of the Saeima and a member of the People's Party, until April 2010.
