= Valērijs Agešins =

Latvian politician and lawyer

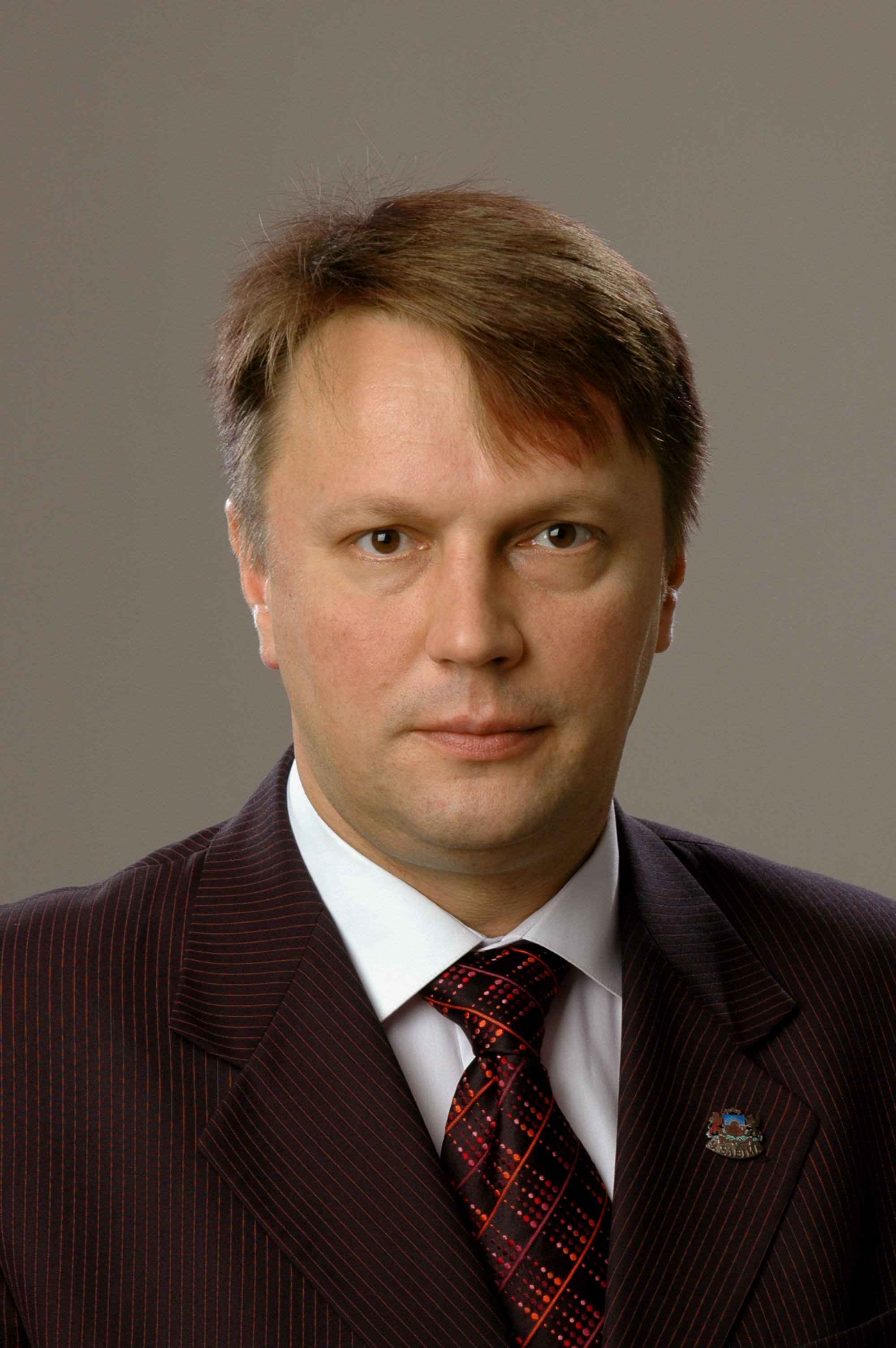

Deputy of the Saeima
- Incumbent
- Assumed office 2002

Personal details
- Born: 23 June 1972 (age 54) Liepāja, Latvian SSR
- Party: Harmony
- Education: Baltic Russian Institute; Immanuel Kant Baltic Federal University; University of Latvia

Valērijs Agešins (born June 23, 1972, in Liepāja) is a Latvian politician and lawyer. He is a member of Harmony and a deputy of the Saeima, elected to represent the Kurzeme electoral district. He began his current term in parliament on November 4, 2014.

From 1994 to 1998 he studied at the Immanuel Kant Baltic Federal University in Kaliningrad, graduating in history. He obtained a master's degree in pedagogy, and in 2002, he graduated from the Baltic Russian Institute as a lawyer. He is not however, a qualified attorney.

From 1997 to 1998 he worked in a teacher training summer camp and from 1995 to 1999 as a law and political science lecturer at the Institute of Social Technologies. From 1998 to 2002 he was a history teacher at Liepāja High School where he was a member of the secondary school teachers' union committee. In 2002 he became a member of the Liepāja City Public Reconciliation Commission, becoming vice-president. Later in 2002 he was elected to the Saeima, and was re-elected again in 2006. His area of specialization is legal issues, the Parliamentary Justice Committee and the Committee on European Affairs.

He speaks three languages, Russian, Latvian, English and enjoys football, swimming, volleyball and basketball.
