= Jānis Vucāns =

Latvian politician (born 1956)

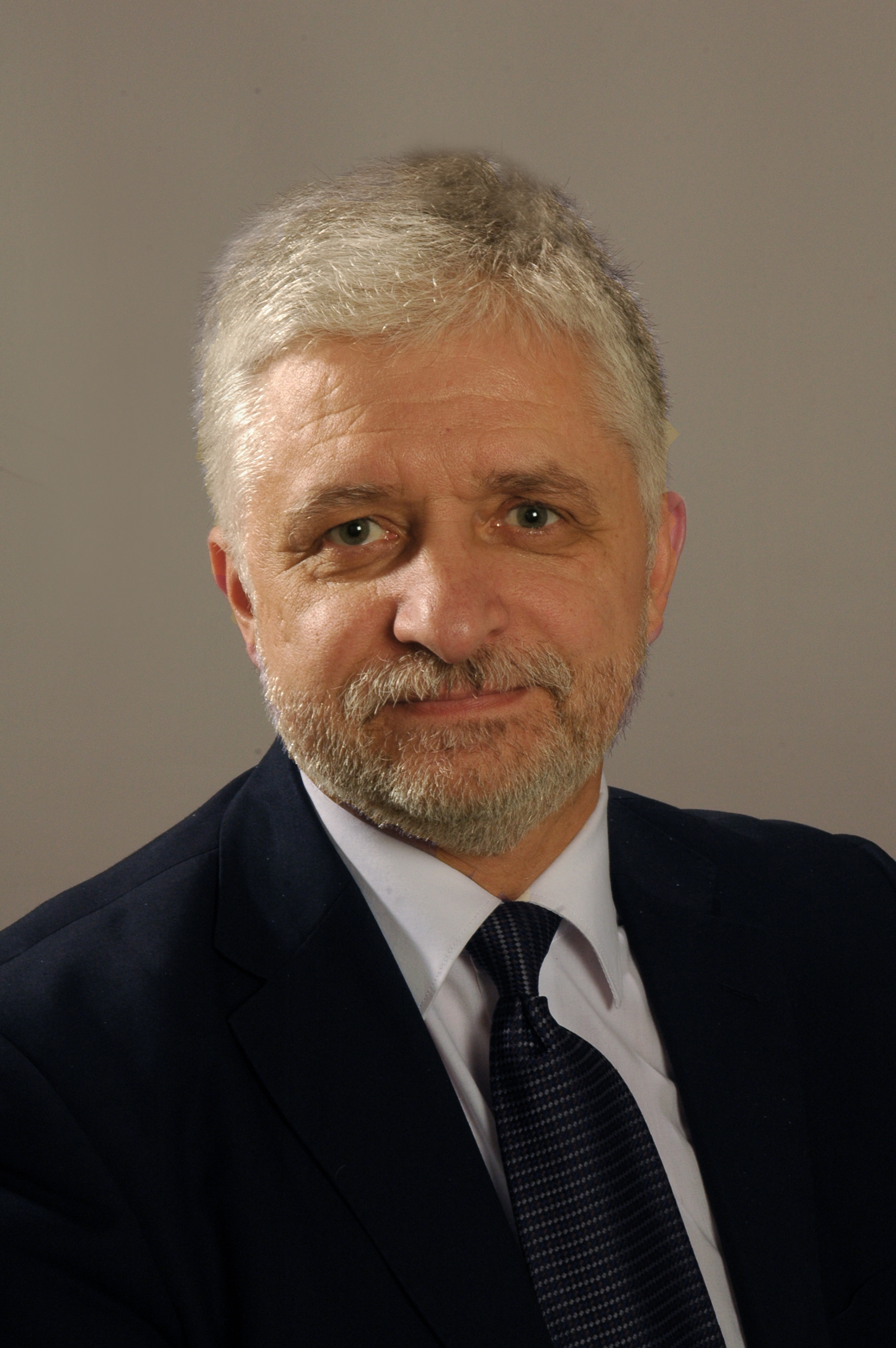
- Official portrait, 2010

Deputy of the Saeima

Personal details
- Born: 9 February 1956 (age 70) Rīga, Latvian SSR
- Party: Latvijai un Ventspilij
- Education: University of Latvia
- Profession: Mathematician

Jānis Vucāns (born 9 February 1956) is a Latvian politician and mathematician. He is the member of the Latvijai un Ventspilij Party and a deputy of the 11th, 12th and 13th Saeima, representing the Union of Greens and Farmers. He began his current term in parliament on 17 October 2011. He has graduated from University of Latvia.

Dr. Vucāns served as President of the Baltic Sea Parliamentary Conference from 2015 through 2016.
