= Kuldīga county =

17th–20th century county in Latvia

Kuldīga county within Latvia in 1940

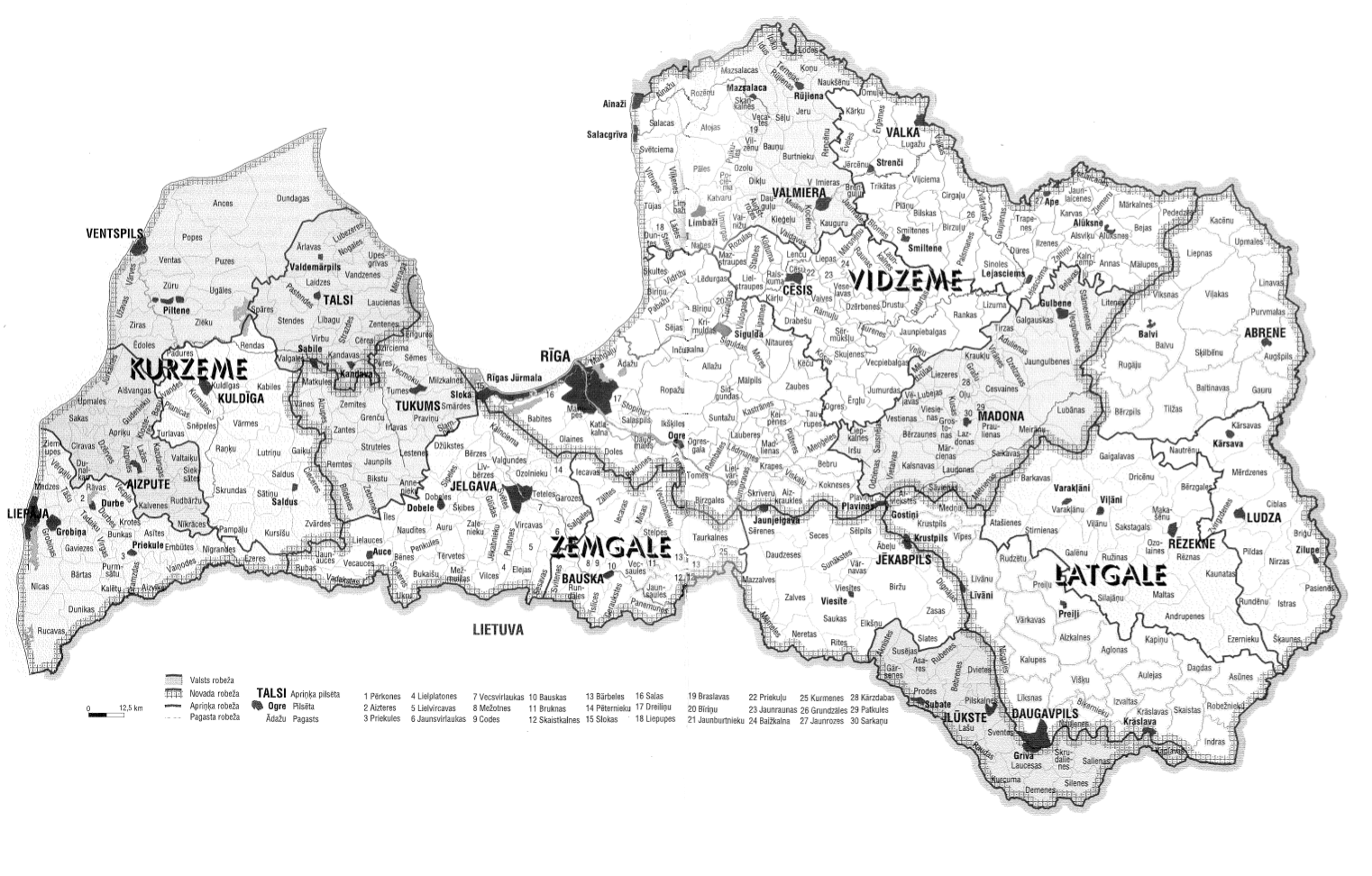
Kuldīgas apriņķis on the map of Latvia (1938).

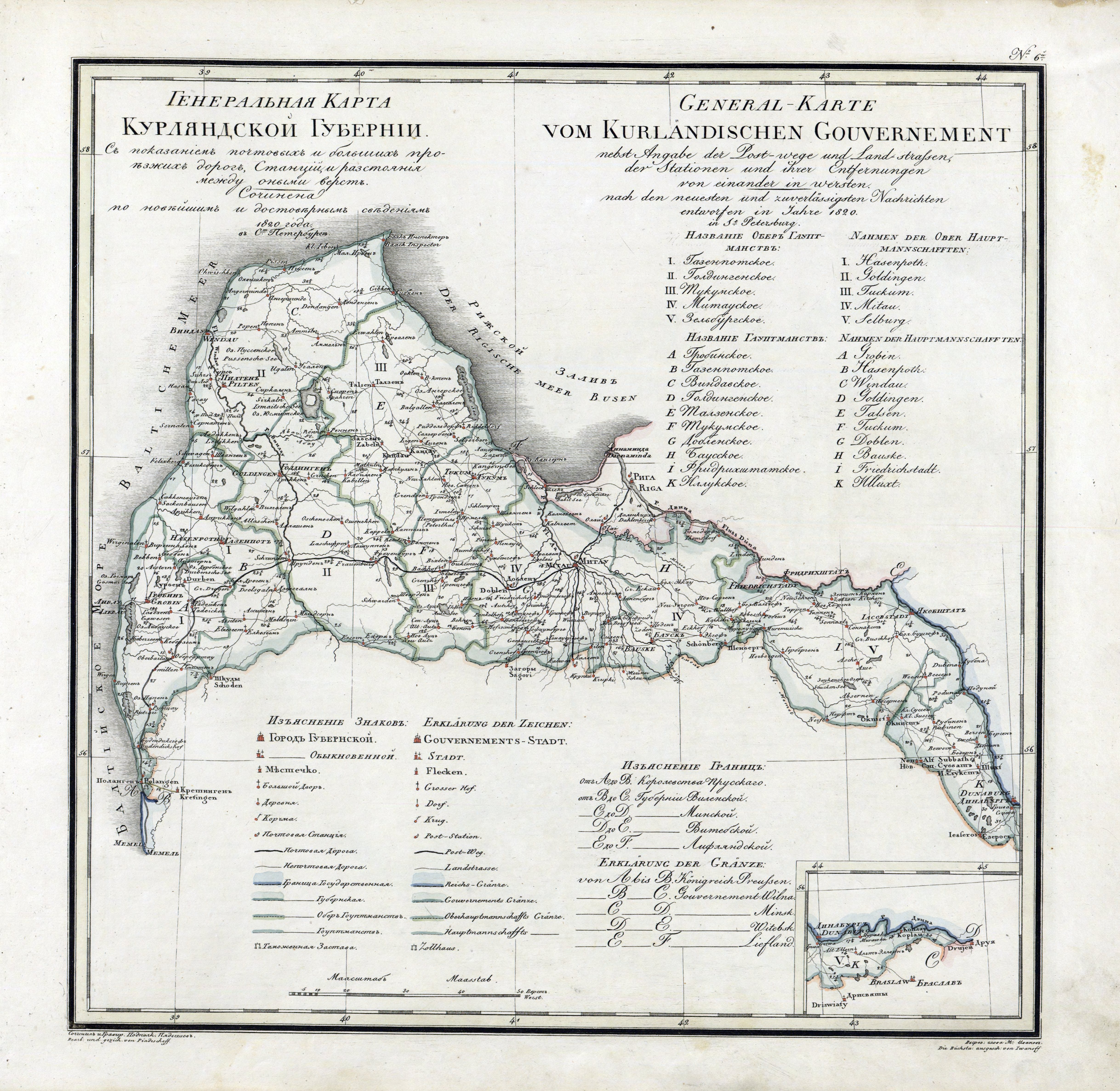
Goldingen County on the map of Courland Governorate (1820).

Kuldīga county (Latvian: Kuldīgas apriņķis, German: Kreis Goldingen, Russian: Гольдингенский уезд) was a historic county of the Courland Governorate and of the Republic of Latvia. Its capital was Kuldīga (Goldingen).

== History ==
The Chief Captaincy of Kuldīga (German: Oberhauptmannschaft Goldingen) was founded in 1617 as a subdivision of the Duchy of Courland and Semigallia. In 1795, the Duchy was incorporated into the Russian Empire, and in 1819 County of Kuldīga (Kreis Goldingen) became one of the ten counties of the Courland Governorate.

After establishment of the Republic of Latvia in 1918, the Kuldīgas apriņķis existed until 1949, when, during the Soviet occupation of Latvia, the Council of Ministers of the Latvian SSR split it into the newly created districts (rajons) of Kuldīga, Saldus, Auce (dissolved in 1959), and Skrunda (dissolved in 1959).

== Demographics ==
At the time of the Russian Empire Census of 1897, Kreis Goldingen had a population of 66,335. Of these, 86.6% spoke Latvian, 8.5% German, 4.0% Yiddish, 0.3% Lithuanian, 0.3% Romani, 0.2% Russian, and 0.1% Polish as their native language.
