= Silva Golde =

Latvian politician and educator

Latvian Minister of Education and Science

Personal details
- Born: 4 August 1955 Liepāja, Latvian SSR
- Died: 31 December 2013 (aged 58)
- Party: People's Party

Silva Golde (4 August 1955 – 31 December 2013) was a Latvian politician and educator, who served as a deputy to the Saeima and Minister of Education and Science.
