= Liepāja district =

District of Latvia

Coordinates: 56°30′42″N 21°00′50″E

Liepāja district Liepājas rajons
- District
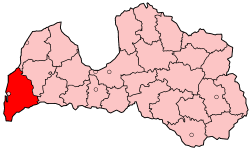
- Country: Latvia
- Created: 1949
- Dissolved: 2009

Area
  - Total: 3,593 km^{2} (1,387 sq mi)

Population
  - Total: 46,609
  - Density: 12.97/km^{2} (33.60/sq mi)
- Website: liepajasrajons.lv/

Liepāja district (Latvian: Liepājas rajons) was an administrative division of Latvia, located in the Courland region, in the country's west.

Districts were eliminated during the administrative-territorial reform in 2009.
