= District of Pilten =

Polish subdivision

Powiat piltyński Kreis Pilten Districtus Regii Piltensis
- 1585–1795
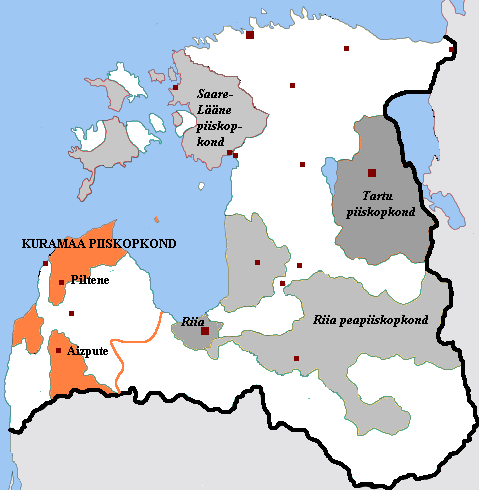
- Capital: Hasenpoth; 56°43′N 21°36′E
- Common languages: Latvian, German
- Religion: Lutheranism
- Government: Monarchy
- History
  - Established: 1585
  - Disestablished: 1795
Preceded by	Succeeded by
Bishopric of Courland; Duchy of Courland and Semigallia	Duchy of Courland and Semigallia; Courland Governorate

The District of Pilten (Polish: Powiat piltyński, German: Kreis Pilten) was an autonomous district of the Polish–Lithuanian Commonwealth and also in union with the Duchy of Courland and Semigallia.

== History ==
Piltene was the center of the Bishopric of Courland, established in 1234. The Treaty of Division of Courland in 1254 transferred several non-contiguous land parcels to the authority of the Bishop of Courland. In January 1521, following the establishment of the secular Duchy of Prussia, the Bishopric of Courland became independent of the now-defunct State of the Teutonic Order and came under the direct control of the Holy Roman Empire as Stift Kurland. In 1557, the town of Piltene was granted Riga city rights.

At the start of the Livonian War, fearing a Russian invasion, Bishop Johann IV von Münchhausen sold the Bishopric of Ösel-Wiek to King Frederick II of Denmark on September 26, 1559, for 30,000 thalers. Frederick II soon purchased the Bishopric of Courland as well. He transferred these lands to his 19-year-old brother, Magnus, Duke of Holstein, in exchange for Holstein. From 1561 to 1567, Magnus resided in Piltene. In 1570, he granted Jews the right to freely settle in his properties, engage in trade and crafts, acquire real estate, and practice their religious activities and traditions. This led to the establishment of the first Jewish community in the territory of Latvia.

In 1570, with the support of Tsar Ivan IV of Russia, Magnus was declared the ruler of the Kingdom of Livonia. Jan Hodkiewicz, the Livonian governor, sought to conquer Magnus' lands in Courland, but Duke Gotthard Kettler opposed him, aiming to annex these lands to his new duchy. The council of regents left by Magnus in Piltene declared allegiance to Duke Gotthard, a decision also supported by the local nobility. After a conflict with Ivan IV, Magnus defected to the Poles and returned to Piltene with his wife and daughter. To raise funds, he mortgaged part of his lands. As Magnus had no son, he named Duke Gotthard's son Friedrich Kettler as his heir in 1579.

== Prussian Pledge (1585–1611) ==
In 1583, Magnus died, officially designating Friedrich Kettler as his heir. The nobility of Piltene delayed reporting Magnus' death, hoping to come under the control of the King of Denmark and avoid the rule of Duke Gotthard of Courland or Catholic Poland. Protestants in Piltene believed Protestant Denmark would better protect them from the threats of the Counter-Reformation. Denmark sent soldiers and cannons to Courland, leading to the Piltene Succession War. Encouraged by Danish support, Piltene rejected Livonian governor Jerzy Radziwiłł’s order to recognize Polish-Lithuanian authority. The Duchy of Courland and Semigallia also failed to subdue Piltene's lands. Radziwiłł ordered a military campaign against Piltene, which Duke Gotthard avoided joining. On July 29, 1583, Piltene’s and Denmark’s forces were defeated in the Battle of Embūte, where 60 cavalrymen and 80 infantrymen with three cannons fought against a Polish unit commanded by Pankoslavsky.

The conflict ended with the Treaty of Kronborg on April 10, 1585. The Polish–Lithuanian Commonwealth, which had conquered the Piltene District, agreed to pay Denmark 30,000 thalers in compensation for the lost lands. Since Poland-Lithuania lacked these funds, the Piltene district was mortgaged to Brandenburg Margrave and Regent of the Duchy of Prussia Georg Friedrich von Hohenzollern-Ansbach, who provided the necessary funds.

Margrave Georg Friedrich sought to expand Hohenzollern holdings in Courland. The last Master of the Livonian Order and the first Duke of Courland and Semigallia, Gotthard Kettler, had already mortgaged the Grobiņa parish district to the Duke of Prussia on April 6, 1560, for 50,000 gulden.

Following the Piltene Succession War, the political center of the district shifted to Aizpute, while Piltene remained the seat of the bishop. The Piltene District was thus divided into three parts:

- Piltene Parish District, mortgaged to the Prussian Duke (ownership later changed).
- Dundaga Parish District, a fief of the Polish Crown until 1795.
- Embūte Parish District–Aizpute Parish District, a fief of the Polish Crown, mortgaged to Duke Wilhelm Kettler of Courland.

The District was occupied by the Swedish troops from 1600 to 1611.

== Aftermath ==
After the Third Partition of Poland, the district became part of the Courland Governorate.
