= Silva Bendrāte =

Latvian radio journalist and politician

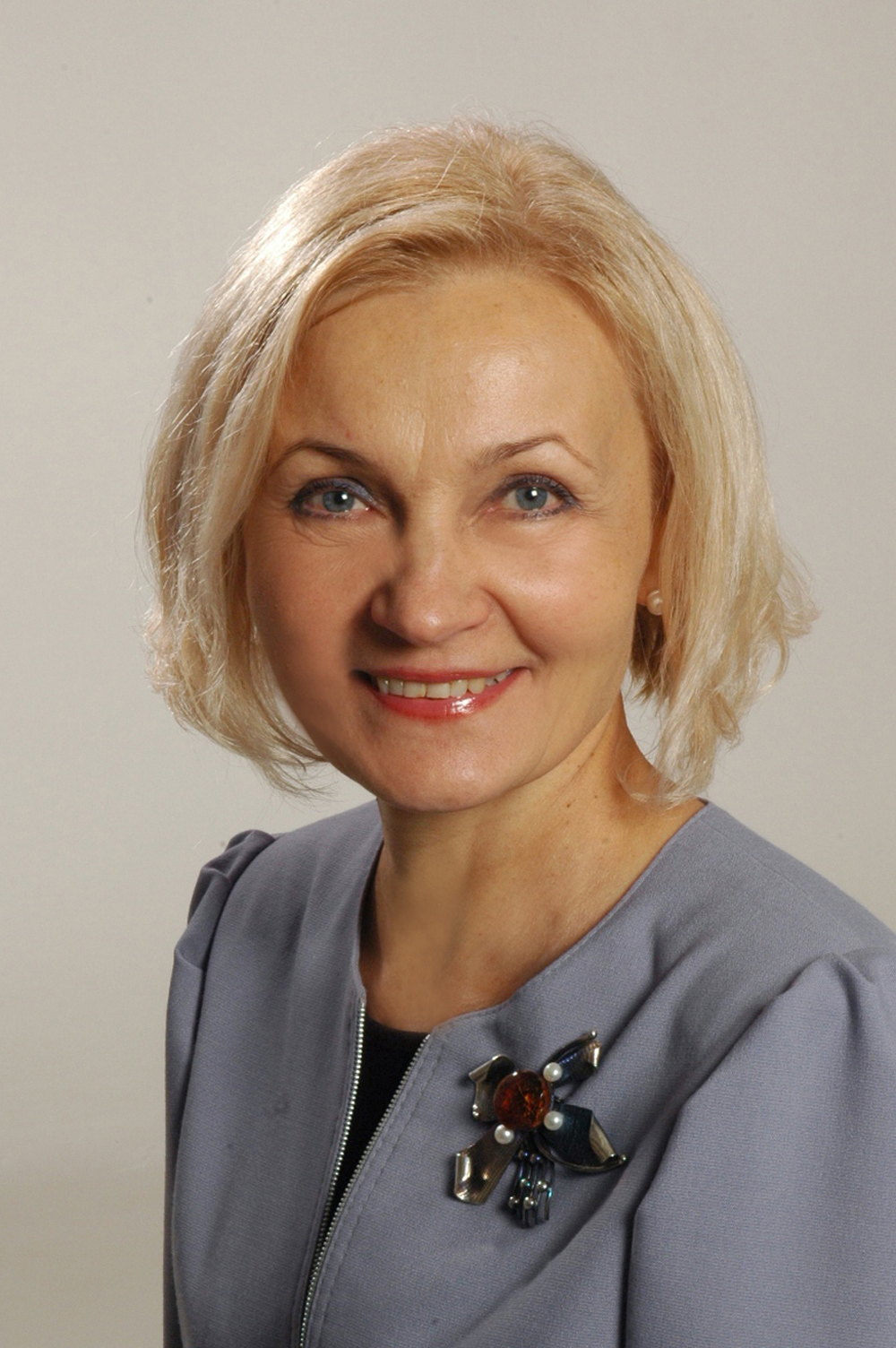

Deputy of the Saeima

Personal details
- Born: February 29, 1956 (age 70) Kuldīga, Latvian SSR
- Party: Unity
- Education: University of Latvia

Silva Bendrāte (born February 29, 1956) is a Latvian radio journalist and politician, who served as deputy to the Saeima from 2014 to 2018.
