= Riga (Saeima constituency) =

Constituency of the Saeima, the national legislature of Latvia

- Rīga; Rīgõ; Рига
- Constituency for the Saeima
- Location of Riga within Latvia
- Municipality: Riga City
- Region: Vidzeme
- Population: 605,802 (2022)
- Electorate: 565,297 (2022)
- Area: 304 km^{2} (2023)

Current constituency
- Created: 1922
- Seats: List: 36 (2022–present); 35 (2018–2022); 32 (2014–2018); 30 (2011–2014); 29 (2006–2011); 28 (1998–2006); 27 (1995–1998); 24 (1993–1995); 21 (1931–1934); 19 (1925–1931); 15 (1922–1925)
- Deputies: List: Skaidrīte Ābrama (PRO); Ieva Brante (AS); Augusts Brigmanis (ZZS); Oļegs Burovs (LPV); Edmunds Cepurītis (PRO); Svetlana Čulkova (S!); Dāvis Mārtiņš Daugavietis (JV); Mārcis Jencītis (LPV); Andrejs Judins (JV); Igors Judins (S!); Edmunds Jurēvics (JV); Inese Kalniņa (JV); Irma Kalniņa (JV); Zanda Kalniņa-Lukaševica (JV); Aleksandrs Kiršteins (NA); Jefimijs Klementjevs (S!); Jurģis Klotiņš (NA); Rihards Kols (NA); Agnese Krasta (JV); Kristaps Krištopans (LPV); Andris Kulbergs (AS); Gunārs Kūtris (ZZS); Ģirts Lapiņš (NA); Gatis Liepiņš (JV); Lauris Lizbovskis (AS); Nataļja Marčenko-Jodko (S!); Antoņina Ņenaševa (PRO); Jānis Patmalnieks (JV); Igors Rajevs (AS); Aleksejs Rosļikovs (S!); Uģis Rotbergs (JV); Zane Skujiņa (JV); Ainārs Šlesers (LPV); Andris Sprūds (PRO); Andris Šuvajevs (PRO); Andrejs Vilks (ZZS)

Riga (Latvian: Rīga; Livonian: Rīgõ, Russian: Рига) is one of the five multi-member constituencies of the Saeima, the national legislature of Latvia. The constituency was established in 1922, when the parliament was established following Latvia's independence. It consists of the city of Riga and overseas voters. The constituency currently elects 36 of the 100 members of the Saeima using the open party-list proportional representation electoral system. At the 2022 parliamentary election it had 565,297 registered electors.

== Electoral system ==
Riga currently elects 36 of the 100 members of the Saeima using the open party-list proportional representation electoral system. Constituency seats are allocated using the Sainte-Laguë method. Only parties that reach the 5% national threshold compete for constituency seats (4% in 1993).

== Election results ==
=== Summary ===
Election	SKG SKG / LSDSP / ATBILDĪBA / LSDA			Harmony SDPS / SC / TSP / SL			Development/For! AP! / LA			Greens & Farmers ZZS / LZS			New Unity JV / V / JL			Latvia First Latvian Way LPP/LC / LC			Conservatives K / JKP			Russian Union РСЛ / ЗаПЧЕЛ / P			Good Latvia PL / TP			National Alliance NA / TB/LNNK / TB		
Election	Votes	%	Seats	Votes	%	Seats	Votes	%	Seats	Votes	%	Seats	Votes	%	Seats	Votes	%	Seats	Votes	%	Seats	Votes	%	Seats	Votes	%	Seats	Votes	%	Seats
2022				19,713	6.70%	0	11,564	3.93%	0	16,371	5.57%	3	61,137	20.79%	11				8,067	2.74%	0	14,106	4.80%	0				21,200	7.21%	4
2018	396	0.14%	0	88,260	30.20%	11	39,209	13.42%	5	14,103	4.83%	2	19,536	6.69%	3				35,696	12.22%	5	11,207	3.84%	0				26,995	9.24%	4
2014				111,872	36.22%	12	2,134	0.69%	0	26,219	8.49%	3	65,359	21.16%	7				2,414	0.78%	0	5,142	1.66%	0				49,406	16.00%	5
2011	673	0.24%	0	118,079	41.82%	13				17,028	6.03%	2	49,479	17.52%	6	8,613	3.05%	0				3,126	1.11%	0				38,086	13.49%	4
2010	1,134	0.38%	0	117,064	39.70%	13				31,508	10.68%	3	85,832	29.10%	9							5,521	1.87%	0	23,073	7.82%	2	21,821	7.40%	2
2006	7,275	2.67%	0	64,971	23.80%	8				25,851	9.47%	3	46,813	17.15%	5	22,223	8.14%	3				27,308	10.00%	3	35,813	13.12%	4	21,488	7.87%	3
2002	10,070	3.54%	0							15,892	5.58%	2	74,799	26.28%	8	12,508	4.39%	0				86,801	30.50%	10	32,354	11.37%	4	16,423	5.77%	2
1998	28,830	11.26%	3	54,698	21.35%	7				3,302	1.29%	0				33,377	13.03%	4							49,788	19.44%	6	51,751	20.20%	6
1995	11,160	4.57%	0	22,903	9.37%	3				2,922	1.20%	0				29,806	12.20%	4										43,607	17.84%	5
1993	2,061	0.75%	0	41,765	15.17%	4				16,570	6.02%	2				66,137	24.03%	6				18,257	6.63%	2				18,744	6.81%	2
1931	56,426	26.35%	6							5,769	2.69%	1																		
1928	55,217	26.98%	5							5,846	2.86%	1																		
1925	70,087	39.18%	8							5,857	3.27%	1																		
1922	40,178	27.46%								4,233	2.89%	0																		

=== Detailed ===
Party has received at least 5% of the vote nationally and is entitled to compete for constituency seats (4% in 1993).

==== 2020s ====
===== 2022 =====
Results of the 2022 parliamentary election held on 1 October 2022:

Party		Votes		Total Votes	%	Seats
Party		Riga City	Expat- riates	Total Votes	%	Seats
New Unity	JV	54,601	6,536	61,137	20.79%	11
For Stability!	S!	25,408	1,764	27,172	9.24%	5
The Progressives	PRO	23,290	3,591	26,881	9.14%	5
Latvia First	LPV	24,332	1,186	25,518	8.68%	4
National Alliance	NA	19,401	1,799	21,200	7.21%	4
United List	AS	18,800	1,713	20,513	6.97%	4
Social Democratic Party "Harmony"	SDPS	19,047	666	19,713	6.70%	0
Union of Greens and Farmers	ZZS	14,883	1,488	16,371	5.57%	3
Sovereign Power	SV	14,275	643	14,918	5.07%	0
Latvian Russian Union	РСЛ	13,529	577	14,106	4.80%	0
For Each and Every One	KuK	12,075	1,662	13,737	4.67%	0
Development/For!	AP	10,233	1,331	11,564	3.93%	0
The Conservatives	K	7,356	711	8,067	2.74%	0
Republic	R	4,064	383	4,447	1.51%	0
Force of People's Power	TVS	4,139	273	4,412	1.50%	0
People's Servants for Latvia	TKL	2,209	363	2,572	0.87%	0
Union for Latvia	AL	802	104	906	0.31%	0
Progressive Christian Party	KPP	428	34	462	0.16%	0
United for Latvia	VL	351	48	399	0.14%	0
Valid votes		269,223	24,872	294,095	100.00%	36
Rejected votes		2,669	164	2,833	0.95%	
Valid envelopes		271,892	25,036	296,928	99.53%	
Rejected envelopes		487	924	1,411	0.47%	
Total polled		272,379	25,960	298,339	52.78%	
Registered electors		403,248	162,049	565,297		
Turnout		67.55%	16.02%	52.78%		

The following candidates were elected: Skaidrīte Ābrama (PRO), 29,828 votes; Augusts Brigmanis (ZZS), 17,324 votes; Oļegs Burovs (LPV), 27,239 votes; Edmunds Cepurītis (PRO), 29,474 votes; Svetlana Čulkova (S!), 30,351 votes; Dāvis Mārtiņš Daugavietis (JV), 61,182 votes; Mārcis Jencītis (LPV), 27,448 votes; Andrejs Judins (JV), 69,339 votes; Igors Judins (S!), 29,780 votes; Inese Kalniņa (JV), 60,755 votes; Irma Kalniņa (JV), 61,838 votes; Zanda Kalniņa-Lukaševica (JV), 61,317 votes; Aleksandrs Kiršteins (NA), 22,785 votes; Jefimijs Klementjevs (S!), 29,698 votes; Rihards Kols (NA), 24,191 votes; Agnese Krasta (JV), 60,822 votes; Kristaps Krištopans (LPV), 26,979 votes; Andris Kulbergs (AS), 22,606 votes; Gunārs Kūtris (ZZS), 18,438 votes; Inese Lībiņa-Egnere (JV), 67,168 votes; Lauris Lizbovskis (AS), 21,352 votes; Nataļja Marčenko-Jodko (S!), 30,322 votes; Ināra Mūrniece (NA), 25,226 votes; Antoņina Ņenaševa (PRO), 30,296 votes; Jānis Patmalnieks (JV), 60,887 votes; Nauris Puntulis (NA), 23,010 votes; Igors Rajevs (AS), 24,272 voetes; Edgars Rinkēvičs (JV), 95,119 votes; Aleksejs Rosļikovs (S!), 46,532 votes; Uģis Rotbergs (JV), 61,056 votes; Zane Skujiņa (JV), 61,146 votes; Ainārs Šlesers (LPV), 41,546 votes; Didzis Šmits (AS), 22,822 votes; Andris Sprūds (PRO), 31,739 votes; Andris Šuvajevs (PRO), 30,454 votes; and Andrejs Vilks (ZZS), 16,945 votes.

==== 2010s ====
===== 2018 =====
Results of the 2018 parliamentary election held on 6 October 2018:

Party		Votes		Total Votes	%	Seats
Party		Riga City	Expat- riates	Total Votes	%	Seats
Social Democratic Party "Harmony"	SDPS	86,208	2,052	88,260	30.20%	11
Development/For!	AP	34,356	4,853	39,209	13.42%	5
Who Owns the State?	KPV LV	24,554	11,341	35,895	12.28%	5
New Conservative Party	JKP	31,888	3,808	35,696	12.22%	5
National Alliance	NA	24,533	2,462	26,995	9.24%	4
New Unity	JV	16,693	2,843	19,536	6.69%	3
Union of Greens and Farmers	ZZS	13,181	922	14,103	4.83%	2
Latvian Russian Union	РСЛ	10,795	412	11,207	3.84%	0
The Progressives	PRO	8,006	1,930	9,936	3.40%	0
Latvian Association of Regions	LRA	5,444	622	6,066	2.08%	0
For Latvia from the Heart	NSL	1,836	167	2,003	0.69%	0
For an Alternative	PA	1,227	38	1,265	0.43%	0
Latvian Nationalists	LN	1,024	129	1,153	0.39%	0
SKG Alliance	SKG	362	34	396	0.14%	0
Action Party	RP	259	23	282	0.10%	0
Latvian Centrist Party	LCP	203	23	226	0.08%	0
Valid votes		260,569	31,659	292,228	100.00%	35
Rejected votes		1,095	134	1,229	0.42%	
Valid envelopes		261,664	31,793	293,457	99.83%	
Rejected envelopes		341	153	494	0.17%	
Total polled		262,005	31,946	293,951	53.53%	
Registered electors		414,331	134,806	549,137		
Turnout		63.24%	23.70%	53.53%		

The following candidates were elected: Iveta Benhena-Bēkena (KPV LV), 38,393 votes; Anda Čakša (ZZS), 15,423 votes; Vjačeslavs Dombrovskis (SDPS), 121,611 votes; Gatis Eglītis (JKP), 39,631 votes; Aldis Gobzems (KPV LV), 48,273 votes; Marija Golubeva (AP), 41,518 votes; Ritvars Jansons (NA), 28,310 votes; Andrejs Judins (JV), 23,311 votes; Nikolajs Kabanovs (SDPS), 95,056 votes; Artuss Kaimiņš (KPV LV), 58,542 votes; Ojārs Ēriks Kalniņš (JV), 23,533 votes; Aleksandrs Kiršteins (NA), 28,626 votes; Andrejs Klementjevs (SDPS), 105,979 votes; Ivans Klementjevs (SDPS), 96,071 votes; Rihards Kols (NA), 30,737 votes; Tālis Linkaits (JKP), 38,775 votes; Regīna Ločmele-Luņova (SDPS), 104,889 votes; Dace Melbārde (NA), 36,925 votes; Linda Ozola (JKP), 37,945 votes; Daniels Pavļuts (AP), 53,344 votes; Igor Pimenov (SDPS), 95,706 votes; Ivars Puga (KPV LV), 38,822 votes; Dana Reizniece-Ozola (ZZS), 18,466 votes; Edgars Rinkēvičs (JV), 28,898 votes; Artūrs Rubiks (SDPS), 95,464 votes; Didzis Šmits (KPV LV), 41,081 votes; Mārtiņš Staķis (AP), 43,839 votes; Julija Stepanenko (SDPS), 99,005 votes; Juta Strīķe (JKP), 43,620 votes; Ļubova Švecova (SDPS), 95,347 votes; Vita Anda Tērauda (AP), 43,316 votes; Boris Tsilevitch (SDPS), 97,857 votes; Jānis Urbanovičs (SDPS), 105,095 votes; Inese Voika (AP), 41,739 votes; and Reinis Znotiņš (JKP), 37,894 votes.

===== 2014 =====
Results of the 2014 parliamentary election held on 4 October 2014:

Party		Votes		Total Votes	%	Seats
Party		Riga City	Expat- riates	Total Votes	%	Seats
Social Democratic Party "Harmony"	SDPS	109,594	2,278	111,872	36.22%	12
Unity	V	57,497	7,862	65,359	21.16%	7
National Alliance	NA	44,467	4,939	49,406	16.00%	5
Union of Greens and Farmers	ZZS	24,279	1,940	26,219	8.49%	3
Latvian Association of Regions	LRA	20,174	4,064	24,238	7.85%	3
For Latvia from the Heart	NSL	16,550	864	17,414	5.64%	2
Latvian Russian Union	РСЛ	4,929	213	5,142	1.66%	0
United for Latvia	VL	3,388	230	3,618	1.17%	0
New Conservative Party	JKP	2,154	260	2,414	0.78%	0
For Latvia's Development	LA	1,948	186	2,134	0.69%	0
Freedom. Free from Fear, Hate and Anger		364	42	406	0.13%	0
Izaugsme		337	31	368	0.12%	0
Sovereignty		255	32	287	0.09%	0
Valid votes		285,936	22,941	308,877	100.00%	32
Rejected votes		1,401	115	1,516	0.49%	
Valid envelopes		287,337	23,056	310,393	99.87%	
Rejected envelopes		354	60	414	0.13%	
Total polled		287,691	23,116	310,807	62.13%	
Registered electors		412,757	87,493	500,250		
Turnout		69.70%	26.42%	62.13%		

The following candidates were elected: Guntis Belēvičs (ZZS), 28,280 votes; Inga Bite (LRA), 19,899 votes; Lolita Čigāne (V), 66,795 votes; Einārs Cilinskis (NA), 60,432 votes; Andrejs Judins (V), 75,602 votes; Artuss Kaimiņš (LRA), 40,481 votes; Ojārs Ēriks Kalniņš (V), 75,595 votes; Andrejs Klementjevs (SDPS), 135,129 votes; Ivans Klementjevs (SDPS), 121,733 votes; Rihards Kozlovskis (V), 68,896 votes; Māris Kučinskis (ZZS), 26,398 votes; Ilmārs Latkovskis (NA), 55,875 votes; Regīna Ločmele-Luņova (SDPS), 121,629 votes; Aleksejs Loskutovs (V), 70,801 votes; Dace Melbārde (NA), 61,632 votes; Romāns Mežeckis (NSL), 17,703 votes; Sergejs Mirskis (SDPS), 122,915 votes; Nikita Nikiforov (SDPS), 119,233 votes; Igor Pimenov (SDPS), 120,258 votes; Sergejs Potapkins (SDPS), 120,873 votes; Dzintars Rasnačs (NA), 57,750 votes; Inguna Rībena (NA), 54,599 votes; Edgars Rinkēvičs (V), 90,577 votes; Artūrs Rubiks (SDPS), 121,114 votes; Kārlis Seržants (ZZS), 28,134 votes; Mārtiņš Šics (LRA), 27,533 votes; Julija Stepanenko (SDPS), 122,383 votes; Inguna Sudraba (NSL), 29,402 votes; Boris Tsilevitch (SDPS), 127,173 votes; Jānis Urbanovičs (SDPS), 146,266 votes; Ilze Viņķele (V), 67,901 votes; and Mihails Zemļinskis (SDPS), 118,977 votes.

===== 2011 =====
Results of the 2011 parliamentary election held on 17 September 2011:

Party		Votes		Total Votes	%	Seats
Party		Riga City	Expat- riates	Total Votes	%	Seats
Harmony Centre	SC	116,050	2,029	118,079	41.82%	13
Unity	V	45,050	4,429	49,479	17.52%	6
Zatlers' Reform Party	ZRP	39,734	3,243	42,977	15.22%	5
National Alliance	NA	35,041	3,045	38,086	13.49%	4
Union of Greens and Farmers	ZZS	16,425	603	17,028	6.03%	2
Latvia's First Party/Latvian Way	LPP/LC	8,316	297	8,613	3.05%	0
For Human Rights in a United Latvia	ЗаПЧЕЛ	3,020	106	3,126	1.11%	0
Last Party	PP	1,478	151	1,629	0.58%	0
Freedom. Free from Fear, Hate and Anger		721	53	774	0.27%	0
For a Presidential Republic	PPR	717	34	751	0.27%	0
Latvian Social Democratic Workers' Party	LSDSP	630	43	673	0.24%	0
People's Control	TK	577	24	601	0.21%	0
Christian Democratic Union	KDS	483	38	521	0.18%	0
Valid votes		268,242	14,095	282,337	100.00%	30
Rejected votes		1,810	76	1,886	0.66%	
Valid envelopes		270,052	14,171	284,223	99.83%	
Rejected envelopes		433	39	472	0.17%	
Total polled		270,485	14,210	284,695	61.80%	
Registered electors		408,683	51,975	460,658		
Turnout		66.18%	27.34%	61.80%		

The following candidates were elected: Inga Bite (ZRP), 44,373 votes; Andris Buiķis (V), 53,572 votes; Einārs Cilinskis (NA), 45,546 votes; Irina Cvetkova (SC), 126,399 votes; Vjačeslavs Dombrovskis (ZRP), 48,783 votes; Kārlis Eņģelis (ZRP), 44,435 votes; Andrejs Judins (V), 54,567 votes; Nikolajs Kabanovs (SC), 131,866 votes; Ojārs Ēriks Kalniņš (V), 55,627 votes; Andrejs Klementjevs (SC), 142,619 votes; Ilmārs Latkovskis (NA), 43,146 votes; Valdis Liepiņš (ZRP), 44,352 votes; Igors Meļņikovs (SC), 126,124 votes; Sergejs Mirskis (SC), 129,763 votes; Nikita Nikiforov (SC), 126,024 votes; Igor Pimenov (SC), 128,529 votes; Sergejs Potapkins (SC), 126,118 votes; Dzintars Rasnačs (NA), 43,335 votes; Inguna Rībena (V), 53,121 votes; Artūrs Rubiks (SC), 135,752 votes; Kārlis Seržants (ZZS), 18,318 votes; Edmunds Sprūdžs (ZRP), 52,369 votes; Dāvis Stalts (NA), 41,586 votes; Boris Tsilevitch (SC), 135,554 votes; Jānis Urbanovičs (SC), 165,451 votes; Raimonds Vējonis (ZZS), 19,729 votes; Andris Vilks (V), 60,091 votes; Ilze Viņķele (V), 54,149 votes; Mihails Zemļinskis (SC), 127,843 votes; and Igors Zujevs (SC), 125,848 votes.

===== 2010 =====
Results of the 2010 parliamentary election held on 2 October 2010:

Party		Votes		Total Votes	%	Seats
Party		Riga City	Expat- riates	Total Votes	%	Seats
Harmony Centre	SC	115,402	1,662	117,064	39.70%	13
Unity	V	78,370	7,462	85,832	29.10%	9
Union of Greens and Farmers	ZZS	30,623	885	31,508	10.68%	3
For a Good Latvia	PL	22,502	571	23,073	7.82%	2
National Alliance	NA	20,243	1,578	21,821	7.40%	2
For Human Rights in a United Latvia	ЗаПЧЕЛ	5,367	154	5,521	1.87%	0
Last Party	PP	2,555	179	2,734	0.93%	0
Made in Latvia	RL	2,204	104	2,308	0.78%	0
For a Presidential Republic	PPR	1,463	61	1,524	0.52%	0
Responsibility – Social Democratic Alliance of Political Parties	ATBILDĪBA	1,082	52	1,134	0.38%	0
People's Control	TK	1,037	11	1,048	0.36%	0
Christian Democratic Union	KDS	865	41	906	0.31%	0
Daugava – For Latvia	ZRP	416	18	434	0.15%	0
Valid votes		282,129	12,778	294,907	100.00%	29
Rejected votes		5,421	147	5,568	1.85%	
Valid envelopes		287,550	12,925	300,475	99.74%	
Rejected envelopes		685	87	772	0.26%	
Total polled		288,235	13,012	301,247	66.91%	
Registered electors		407,481	42,724	450,205		
Turnout		70.74%	30.46%	66.91%		

The following candidates were elected: Andris Buiķis (V), 93,278 votes; Lolita Čigāne (V), 96,204 votes; Einārs Cilinskis (NA), 23,674 votes; Ints Dālderis (V), 89,528 votes; Sergey Dolgopolov (SC), 136,444 votes; Aleksejs Holostovs (SC), 121,015 votes; Nikolajs Kabanovs (SC), 126,659 votes; Ojārs Ēriks Kalniņš (V), 92,705 votes; Rasma Kārkliņa (V), 89,870 votes; Andrejs Klementjevs (SC), 134,440 votes; Ģirts Valdis Kristovskis (V), 99,430 votes; Imants Lieģis (V), 89,910 votes; Igors Meļņikovs (SC), 121,742 votes; Sergejs Mirskis (SC), 125,288 votes; Nikita Nikiforov (SC), 121,107 votes; Igor Pimenov (SC), 122,280 votes; Dzintars Rasnačs (NA), 24,123 votes; Inguna Rībena (V), 89,634 votes; Artūrs Rubiks (SC), 126,669 votes; Kārlis Seržants (ZZS), 33,540 votes; Inese Šlesere (PL), 24,430 votes; Ainārs Šlesers (PL), 35,940 votes; Jānis Strazdiņš (ZZS), 32,298 votes; Boris Tsilevitch (SC), 131,615 votes; Jānis Urbanovičs (SC), 174,139 votes; Raimonds Vējonis (ZZS), 36,139 votes; Ilze Viņķele (V), 88,647 votes; Mihails Zemļinskis (SC), 122,040 votes; and Igors Zujevs (SC), 121,140 votes.

==== 2000s ====
===== 2006 =====
Results of the 2006 parliamentary election held on 7 October 2006:

Party		Votes		Total Votes	%	Seats
Party		Riga City	Expat- riates	Total Votes	%	Seats
Harmony Centre	SC	64,543	428	64,971	23.80%	8
New Era Party	JL	43,975	2,838	46,813	17.15%	5
People's Party	TP	34,776	1,037	35,813	13.12%	4
For Human Rights in a United Latvia	ЗаПЧЕЛ	26,891	417	27,308	10.00%	3
Union of Greens and Farmers	ZZS	25,292	559	25,851	9.47%	3
Latvia's First Party/Latvian Way	LPP/LC	21,756	467	22,223	8.14%	3
For Fatherland and Freedom/LNNK	TB/LNNK	20,199	1,289	21,488	7.87%	3
Motherland		8,998	48	9,046	3.31%	0
Latvian Social Democratic Workers' Party	LSDSP	7,194	81	7,275	2.67%	0
All for Latvia!		3,270	78	3,348	1.23%	0
New Democrats	NJD	2,493	88	2,581	0.95%	0
Pensioners and Seniors Party	PSP	2,073	47	2,120	0.78%	0
Eurosceptics		1,125	19	1,144	0.42%	0
Māra's Land		1,099	34	1,133	0.42%	0
Our Land Party		460	18	478	0.18%	0
Fatherland Union	TS	349	12	361	0.13%	0
National Power Union	NSS	348	13	361	0.13%	0
Social Fairness Party	STP	335	10	345	0.13%	0
Latvian's Latvia National Political Defence Organisation		292	7	299	0.11%	0
Valid votes		265,468	7,490	272,958	100.00%	29
Rejected votes				1,676	0.61%	
Valid envelopes				274,634	99.78%	
Rejected envelopes				616	0.22%	
Total polled				275,250	63.18%	
Registered electors				435,634		

The following candidates were elected: Solvita Āboltiņa (JL), 56,437 votes; Ainars Baštiks (LPP/LC), 27,764 votes; Vladimir Buzayev (ЗаПЧЕЛ), 31,332 votes; Ilma Čepāne (JL), 56,584 votes; Juris Dalbiņš (TP), 37,182 votes; Juris Dobelis (TB/LNNK), 25,073 votes; Sergey Dolgopolov (SC), 79,657 votes; Māris Grīnblats (TB/LNNK), 26,442 votes; Nikolajs Kabanovs (ЗаПЧЕЛ), 32,079 votes; Andrejs Klementjevs (SC), 73,196 votes; Sergejs Mirskis (SC), 69,711 votes; Alexander Mirsky (SC), 76,509 votes; Vineta Muižniece (TP), 37,321 votes; Linda Mūrniece (JL), 55,644 votes; Leopolds Ozoliņš (ZZS), 26,479 votes; Yakov Pliner (ЗаПЧЕЛ), 35,327 votes; Pauls Putniņš (ZZS); 26,273 votes; Dzintars Rasnačs (TB/LNNK), 24,067 votes; Inguna Rībena (JL), 54,002 votes; Artūrs Rubiks (SC), 74,633 votes; Kārlis Šadurskis (JL), 54,080 votes; Mareks Segliņš (TP), 37,976 votes; Inese Šlesere (LPP/LC), 24,188 votes; Ainārs Šlesers (LPP/LC), 31,325 votes; Oskars Spurdziņš (TP), 37,468 votes; Jānis Strazdiņš (ZZS), 27,020 votes; Boris Tsilevitch (SC), 72,837 votes; Jānis Urbanovičs (SC), 74,296 votes; and Nils Ušakovs (SC), 89,408 votes.

===== 2002 =====
Results of the 2002 parliamentary election held on 5 October 2002:

Party		Votes		Total Votes	%	Seats
Party		Riga City	Expat- riates	Total Votes	%	Seats
For Human Rights in a United Latvia	ЗаПЧЕЛ	86,358	443	86,801	30.50%	10
New Era Party	JL	70,961	3,838	74,799	26.28%	8
People's Party	TP	31,653	701	32,354	11.37%	4
Latvia's First Party	LPP	21,548	235	21,783	7.65%	2
For Fatherland and Freedom/LNNK	TB/LNNK	15,511	912	16,423	5.77%	2
Union of Greens and Farmers	ZZS	15,499	393	15,892	5.58%	2
Latvian Way	LC	11,963	545	12,508	4.39%	0
Latvian Social Democratic Workers' Party	LSDSP	9,996	74	10,070	3.54%	0
Social Democratic Welfare Party	SDLP	4,894	21	4,915	1.73%	0
Social Democratic Union	SDS	2,829	41	2,870	1.01%	0
Latvians' Party	LP	1,310	44	1,354	0.48%	0
Russian Party		1,029	15	1,044	0.37%	0
Political Alliance "Centre"		1,010	7	1,017	0.36%	0
Latvian Revival Party	LAP	505	27	532	0.19%	0
Freedom Party	BP	477	4	481	0.17%	0
Light of Latgale	LG	460	18	478	0.17%	0
Progressive Centre Party	PCP	404	7	411	0.14%	0
Māra's Land		328	7	335	0.12%	0
Citizens' Union "Our Land"		304	12	316	0.11%	0
Latvian United Republican Party	LARP	237	6	243	0.09%	0
Valid votes		277,276	7,350	284,626	100.00%	28
Rejected votes				1,133	0.40%	
Valid envelopes				285,759	99.65%	
Rejected envelopes				1,003	0.35%	
Total polled				286,762	72.10%	
Registered electors				397,745		

The following candidates were elected: Ainars Baštiks (LPP), 24,929 votes; Gundars Bērziņš (TP), 35,518 votes; Vladimir Buzayev (ЗаПЧЕЛ), 96,747 votes; Valdis Dombrovskis (JL), 78,060 votes; Ina Druviete (JL), 79,896 votes; Māris Gulbis (JL), 84,013 votes; Jānis Jurkāns (ЗаПЧЕЛ), 126,117 votes; Nikolajs Kabanovs (ЗаПЧЕЛ), 97,687 votes; Aigars Kalvītis (TP), 33,208 votes; Valērijs Karpuškins (ЗаПЧЕЛ), 95,320 votes; Aleksandrs Kiršteins (TP), 33,425 votes; Paulis Kļaviņš (LPP), 23,235 votes; Andrejs Klementjevs (ЗаПЧЕЛ), 97,502 votes; Guntars Krasts (TB/LNNK), 24,328 votes; Aigars Pētersons (JL), 77,227 votes; Rihards Pīks (TP), 33,868 votes; Yakov Pliner (ЗаПЧЕЛ), 98,273 votes; Einars Repše (JL), 110,911 votes; Inguna Rībena (JL), 81,218 votes; Kārlis Šadurskis (JL), 78,157 votes; Juris Sokolovskis (ЗаПЧЕЛ), 95,815 votes; Jānis Strazdiņš (ZZS), 17,130 votes; Kārlis Strēlis (JL), 76,713 votes; Boris Tsilevitch (ЗаПЧЕЛ), 99,729 votes; Dainis Turlais (ЗаПЧЕЛ), 99,114 votes; Arvīds Ulme (ZZS), 16,654 votes; Jānis Urbanovičs (ЗаПЧЕЛ), 94,624 votes; and Roberts Zīle (TB/LNNK), 20,943 votes.

==== 1990s ====
===== 1998 =====
Results of the 1998 parliamentary election held on 3 October 1998:

Party		Votes		Total Votes	%	Seats
Party		Riga City	Expat- riates	Total Votes	%	Seats
National Harmony Party	TSP	54,566	132	54,698	21.35%	7
For Fatherland and Freedom/LNNK	TB/LNNK	47,093	4,658	51,751	20.20%	6
People's Party	TP	46,435	3,353	49,788	19.44%	6
Latvian Way	LC	32,636	741	33,377	13.03%	4
Latvian Social Democratic Alliance	LSDA	28,683	147	28,830	11.26%	3
New Party	JP	16,049	234	16,283	6.36%	2
Workers' Party, Christian Democratic Union and Latvian Green Party	DP–KDS–LZP	4,839	267	5,106	1.99%	0
Latvian Farmers' Union	LZS	3,066	236	3,302	1.29%	0
National Progress Party	NPP	2,417	7	2,424	0.95%	0
Democratic Party "Saimnieks"		2,280	36	2,316	0.90%	0
People's Movement for Latvia	TKL	2,171	32	2,203	0.86%	0
Latvian Revival Party	LAP	1,239	18	1,257	0.49%	0
Popular Movement "Freedom"		730	53	783	0.31%	0
Latvian National Democratic Party	LNDP	759	19	778	0.30%	0
Social Democratic Women's Organisation	SDSO	720	26	746	0.29%	0
Conservative Party	KP	624	22	646	0.25%	0
Latvian Unity Party	LVP	615	4	619	0.24%	0
Helsinki-86		534	31	565	0.22%	0
Māra's Land	MZ	288	11	299	0.12%	0
Latvian National Reform Party	LNRP	184	4	188	0.07%	0
Democrats' Party	DP	172	8	180	0.07%	0
Valid votes		246,100	10,039	256,139	100.00%	28
Rejected votes				1,322	0.51%	
Valid envelopes				257,461	99.40%	
Rejected envelopes				1,543	0.60%	
Total polled				259,004	68.81%	
Registered electors				376,426		

The following candidates were elected: Egils Baldzēns (LSDA), 30,832 votes; Andris Bērziņš (JP), 17,575 votes; Indulis Bērziņš (LC), 36,533 votes; Imants Burvis (LSDA), 30,474 votes; Helēna Demakova (TP), 51,538 votes; Oļegs Deņisovs (TSP), 62,208 votes; Juris Dobelis (TB/LNNK), 61,965 votes; Jānis Gaigals (LC), 35,148 votes; Valdis Ģīlis (TP), 51,420 votes; Māris Grīnblats (TB/LNNK), 65,842 votes; Jānis Jurkāns (TSP), 74,687 votes; Aleksandrs Kiršteins (TP), 53,003 votes; Andrejs Klementjevs (TSP), 60,999 votes; Guntars Krasts (TB/LNNK), 68,926 votes; Rišards Labanovskis (LSDA), 32,702 votes; Modris Lujāns (TSP), 60,824 votes; Romāns Mežeckis (JP), 17,070 votes; Karina Pētersone (LC), 35,290 votes; Rihards Pīks (TP), 53,320 votes; Yakov Pliner (TSP), 60,912 votes; Dzintars Rasnačs (TB/LNNK), 57,449 votes; Romualds Ražuks (LC), 34,174 votes; Juris Sinka (TB/LNNK), 58,459 votes; Jānis Škapars (TP), 51,722 votes; Juris Sokolovskis (TSP), 61,545 votes; Boris Tsilevitch (TSP), 62,543 votes; Māris Vītols (TP), 52,718 votes; and Roberts Zīle (TB/LNNK), 63,840 votes.

===== 1995 =====
Results of the 1995 parliamentary election held on 30 September and 1 October 1995:

Party		Votes	%	Seats
For Fatherland and Freedom	TB	43,607	17.84%	5
Democratic Party "Saimnieks"	DPS	31,221	12.78%	4
Latvian Way	LC	29,806	12.20%	4
Latvian National Conservative Party and Latvian Green Party	LNNK-LZP	24,275	9.93%	3
People's Movement for Latvia	TKL	23,398	9.57%	3
National Harmony Party	TSP	22,903	9.37%	3
Socialist Party of Latvia	LSP	18,526	7.58%	2
Latvian Farmers' Union, Christian Democratic Union and Latgalian Labour Party	LZS-KDS-LDP	12,911	5.28%	2
Labour and Justice Coalition: LDDP, LSDSP and LACAP	LDDP-LSDSP-LACAP	11,160	4.57%	0
Latvian Unity Party	LVP	9,552	3.91%	1
Party of Russian Citizens in Latvia	ПргЛ	4,281	1.75%	0
Popular Front of Latvia	LTF	3,113	1.27%	0
Latvian Farmers' Union	LZS	2,922	1.20%	0
Political Association of the Underprivileged and Latvian Independence Party		2,241	0.92%	0
Political Union of Economists	TPA	1,728	0.71%	0
Citizens Union "Our Land" – Anti-Communist Union		1,231	0.50%	0
Democrats' Party	DP	603	0.25%	0
Latvian Liberal Party	LLP	460	0.19%	0
Latvian National Democratic Party	LNDP	428	0.18%	0
Valid votes		244,366	100.00%	27

The following candidates were elected: Indulis Bērziņš (LC), 30,283 votes; Imants Daudišs (LC), 30,209 votes; Oļegs Deņisovs (LSP), 21,279 votes; Juris Dobelis (LNNK-LZP), 27,326 votes; Vladlens Dozorcevs (TSP), 26,449 votes; Kārlis Jūlijs Druva (LZS-KDS-LDP), 13,910 votes; Aivars Endziņš (LC), 30,707 votes; Māris Grīnblats (TB), 59,731 votes; Jānis Jurkāns (TSP), 32,611 votes; Ivars Jānis Ķezbers (DPS), 35,355 votes; Aleksandrs Kiršteins (LNNK-LZP), 28,152 votes; Paulis Kļaviņš (LZS-KDS-LDP), 14,556 votes; Andrejs Krastiņš (LNNK-LZP), 27,733 votes; Ilga Kreituse (DPS), 33,674 votes; Valdis Krisbergs (DPS), 32,592 votes; Ludmila Kuprijanova (TSP), 25,326 votes; Modris Lujāns (LSP), 20,642 votes; Leopolds Ozoliņš (TB), 51,958 votes; Andrejs Panteļējevs (LC), 33,180 votes; Normunds Pēterkops (TB), 46,205 votes; Aleksandrs Pētersons (TB), 46,643 votes; Andris Rubins (TKL), 24,165 votes; Māris Rudzītis (TKL), 24,288 votes; Juris Sinka (TB), 47,803 votes; Gundars Valdmanis (LVP), 10,295 votes; Juris Zaķis (DPS), 32,228 votes; and Elmārs Zelgalvis (TKL), 23,991 votes.

===== 1993 =====
Results of the 1993 parliamentary election held on 5 and 6 June 1993:

Party		Votes	%	Seats
Latvian Way	LC	66,137	24.03%	6
Latvian National Independence Movement	LNNK	50,600	18.38%	5
Harmony for Latvia	SL	41,765	15.17%	4
For Fatherland and Freedom	TB	18,744	6.81%	2
Equal Rights	Р	18,257	6.63%	2
Latvian Farmers' Union	LZS	16,570	6.02%	2
Christian Democratic Union	KDS	15,784	5.73%	2
Democratic Center Party of Latvia	DCP	14,067	5.11%	1
Popular Front of Latvia	LTF	7,979	2.90%	0
Green List		4,667	1.70%	0
Russian National Democratic List		3,802	1.38%	0
Economic Activity League		2,796	1.02%	0
Democratic Labour Party of Latvia	LDDP	2,695	0.98%	0
Latvia's Happiness		2,346	0.85%	0
Citizens Union "Our Land"		2,068	0.75%	0
Latvian Social Democratic Workers' Party	LSDSP	2,061	0.75%	0
Anti-Communist Union		1,471	0.53%	0
Republican Platform		1,176	0.43%	0
Conservatives and Peasants		722	0.26%	0
Independents' Union		565	0.21%	0
Latvian Unity Party	LVP	363	0.13%	0
Latvian Liberal Party	LLP	362	0.13%	0
Liberal Alliance		245	0.09%	0
Valid votes		275,242	100.00%	24
Rejected votes		4,033	1.44%	
Valid envelopes		279,275		

The following candidates were elected: Andris Ameriks (SL), 42,184 votes; Romāns Apsītis (LC), 63,995 votes; Eduards Berklavs (LNNK), 58,548 votes; Indulis Bērziņš (LC), 66,905 votes; Māris Budovskis (LNNK), 54,575 votes; Igors Bukovskis (SL), 44,336 votes; Māris Grīnblats (TB), 22,222 votes; Aivars Jerumanis (KDS), 20,683 votes; Ēriks Kaža (SL), 42,659 votes; Aleksandrs Kiršteins (LNNK), 57,406 votes; Visvaldis Varnesis Klīve (LZS), 17,536 votes; Odisejs Kostanda (LNNK), 66,851 votes; Nikolajs Krasohins (Р), 19,206 votes; Andrejs Krastiņš (LNNK), 60,076 votes; Ludmila Kuprijanova (SL), 43,408 votes; Kārlis Leiškalns (DCP), 14,742 votes; Egils Levits (LC), 67,608 votes; Ruta Marjaša (LC), 65,862 votes; Andrejs Panteļējevs (LC), 81,377 votes; Aida Prēdele (KDS), 17,383 votes; Jānis Ritenis (LZS), 17,624 votes; Alfrēds Rubiks (Р), 27,511 votes; Andrejs Siliņš (LC), 63,659 votes; and Juris Sinka (TB), 20,288 votes.

==== 1930s ====
===== 1931 =====
Results of the 1931 parliamentary election held on 3 and 4 October 1931:

Party		Votes	%	Seats
Latvian Social Democratic Workers' Party	LSDSP	56,426	26.35%	6
Democratic Centre	DC	26,856	12.54%	3
Leftist Workers and Farm Labourers	KSDZ	22,997	10.74%	2
German-Baltic Party in Latvia	DbPL	19,547	9.13%	2
Agudas Israel		10,443	4.88%	1
Orthodox, Old Believers and United Russian Organizations	П	8,490	3.96%	1
Workers and Poor Peasants	SNZ	7,610	3.55%	1
Union for Peace, Order and Production	MKRA	6,518	3.04%	1
Christian Union and Workers	KAS	6,115	2.86%	1
Trade Union of Railwaymen, Government Workers, Craftsmen and Workers	DVDASAA	5,976	2.79%	1
Latvian Farmers' Union	LZS	5,769	2.69%	1
Progressive Association	PA	5,478	2.56%	1
Zionist Organisation Mizrachi		5,355	2.50%	0
Latvian Polish Union Polish-Catholics	ZPwŁ	5,153	2.41%	0
United List of New Farmers – Small Landowners Party, Economic Centre and Dischargees		5,065	2.37%	0
National Union	NA	4,670	2.18%	0
Women's Organisations		3,158	1.47%	0
Russian Old Believers Working People's Voters	РС	2,192	1.02%	0
Jewish Progressive Union		2,116	0.99%	0
Latvian Tenant Protection Association		1,806	0.84%	0
Party of Former Money Depositors		1,622	0.76%	0
Latvian Social Democratic Opposition Workers		775	0.36%	0
Valid votes		214,137	100.00%	21
Rejected votes		1,633	0.76%	
Valid envelopes		215,770	99.98%	
Rejected envelopes		40	0.02%	
Total polled		215,810		

==== 1920s ====
===== 1928 =====
Results of the 1928 parliamentary election held on 6 and 7 October 1928:

Party		Votes	%	Seats
Latvian Social Democratic Workers' Party	LSDSP	55,217	26.98%	5
Leftist Workers and Farm Labourers	KSDZ	31,872	15.57%	3
German-Baltic Party in Latvia	DbPL	27,061	13.22%	3
National Union	NA	9,401	4.59%	1
Orthodox, Old Believers and United Russian Organizations	П	8,570	4.19%	1
Zionist Organisation Mizrachi		7,774	3.80%	1
Christian Union and Workers Party	KASP	7,605	3.72%	1
Latvian Labour Union	LDS	6,514	3.18%	1
Democratic Centre	DC	5,947	2.91%	1
Latvian Farmers' Union	LZS	5,846	2.86%	1
Agudas Israel		5,305	2.59%	1
Union for Peace, Order and Production	MKRA	5,218	2.55%	0
Economic Centre, Soldiers, Merchants. Industrialists and Craftsmen		4,492	2.20%	0
Economic Association		3,329	1.63%	0
Latgallian Independent Socialist Party	LNSP	3,204	1.57%	0
Christian Peasant and Catholic Party	KZKP	2,458	1.20%	0
Party of Former Money Depositors and Other Victims		2,186	1.07%	0
Jewish Democratic Bloc		2,160	1.06%	0
Latvian Polish-Catholic Union	ZPwŁ	2,045	1.00%	0
Latvian Women's Union		1,888	0.92%	0
Radical Democrats		1,867	0.91%	0
United Old Believers	AV	1,701	0.83%	0
Union of Social Democrats and Farmers		1,346	0.66%	0
Ceire Cion	CC	1,338	0.65%	0
People's Rights and Health Defenders		297	0.15%	0
Valid votes		204,641	100.00%	19
Rejected votes		1,491	0.72%	
Valid envelopes		206,132	99.98%	
Rejected envelopes		45	0.02%	
Total polled		206,177		

===== 1925 =====
Results of the 1925 parliamentary election held on 3 and 4 October 1925:

Party		Votes	%	Seats		
Party		Votes	%	Con.	Com.	Tot.
Latvian Social Democratic Workers' Party	LSDSP	70,087	39.18%	8	0	8
German-Baltic Party in Latvia	DbPL	28,227	15.78%	3	0	3
Democratic Centre	DC	13,180	7.37%	2	0	2
National Union	NA	10,305	5.76%	1	0	1
Agudas Israel		6,048	3.38%	1	0	1
Latvian Farmers' Union	LZS	5,857	3.27%	1	0	1
Union for Peace, Order and Production	MKRA	4,923	2.75%	1	0	1
Christian National Union	KNS	4,271	2.39%	1	1	2
Union of Orthodox Voters and Russian Organisations	П	4,082	2.28%	1	0	1
Zionist Organisation Mizrachi		3,288	1.84%	0	0	0
Latvian Labour Union	LDS	2,805	1.57%	0	0	0
Old Believers	V	2,371	1.33%	0	0	0
Combined Workers, Disabled People and Workers		2,280	1.27%	0	0	0
Party of Catholics and Christian Peasants	KKZP	2,156	1.21%	0	0	0
Polish-Catholic Latvian Union of Poles	ZpwŁ	2,021	1.13%	0	0	0
National Farmers' Union	NZS	1,966	1.10%	0	0	0
Ceire Cion	CC	1,891	1.06%	0	0	0
Jewish National Democratic Party		1,875	1.05%	0	0	0
Latvian New Farmers' Union	LJS	1,575	0.88%	0	0	0
"Bund" in Latvia		1,423	0.80%	0	0	0
Social Democrats Mensheviks	SDM	1,283	0.72%	0	0	0
Congress of Destroyed Areas and Agricultural Association		1,244	0.70%	0	0	0
Union of Riga Outskirts		1,139	0.64%	0	0	0
Russian Parishes and Public Employees	OPOД	1,064	0.59%	0	0	0
Economically Active Citizens		1,056	0.59%	0	0	0
Union of Latvian Democrats	LDS	812	0.45%	0	0	0
Latvian National Workers' Party		515	0.29%	0	0	0
Latvian New Farmers-Small Landowners Party	LJSP	386	0.22%	0	0	0
Latgallian Democratic Party	LDP	241	0.13%	0	0	0
Histadruth-Hacionith		235	0.13%	0	0	0
Latgallian Labour Party–Latgale Union of Smallholders and Stateless Persons	LDP-LMBS	177	0.10%	0	0	0
Latgallian Farmers Party	LZP	114	0.06%	0	0	0
Valid votes		178,897	100.00%	19	1	20
Rejected votes						
Valid envelopes						
Rejected envelopes						
Total polled						
Registered electors		216,163				

===== 1922 =====
Results of the 1922 parliamentary election held on 7 and 8 October 1922:

Party		Votes	%	Seats		
Party		Votes	%	Con.	Com.	Tot.
Latvian Social Democratic Workers' Party	LSDSP	40,178	27.46%			4
Democratic Centre	DC	29,526	20.18%			3
German-Baltic Party in Latvia	DbPL	25,901	17.70%			3
Non-Partisan National Centre	BNC	9,859	6.74%			1
Christian National Union	KNS	6,898	4.72%			1
United Jewish National Bloc	EANB	6,739	4.61%			1
Agudas Israel		4,728	3.23%			1
United List of Russians	ОРС	4,710	3.22%	0	0	0
Latvian Farmers' Union	LZS	4,233	2.89%			1
Union of Social Democrats – Mensheviks and Rural Workers	SDML	3,455	2.36%			1
United Polish Parties	ZpwŁ	2,125	1.45%	0	0	0
List of Lithuanians and Catholics	LK	1,563	1.07%	0	0	0
Latvian New Farmers' Union	LJS	1,364	0.93%			1
Latvian Abstainers		1,031	0.70%	0	0	0
Latvian Central Committee of Old Believers	LVCK	908	0.62%	0	0	0
Colonel Jansons' List		544	0.37%	0	0	0
Ceire Cion	CC	533	0.36%	0	0	0
Independent Russian Association		469	0.32%	0	0	0
War Invalids, Families and Soldiers on Leave		437	0.30%	0	0	0
Latgallian People's Unions	LTA	349	0.24%	0	0	0
Land Workers' Association		327	0.22%	0	0	0
Group of Estonian Voters		260	0.18%	0	0	0
Latvian Fishermen's Union and Group of Sailors		156	0.11%	0	0	0
"Bund" in Latvia		0	0.00%	0	0	0
Belarusian in Latgallia		0	0.00%	0	0	0
Jewish People's Party		0	0.00%	0	0	0
Latgallian Christian Peasant's Union	LKZS	0	0.00%	0	0	0
Latgallian Farmers Party	LZP	0	0.00%	0	0	0
Latgallian Small Landless Farmers–Latgallian Labour Party	LMB-LDP	0	0.00%	0	0	0
Latgallian Workers' Union	LDA	0	0.00%	0	0	0
Union of Latgallian Villagers, Landowners and Tenants		0	0.00%	0	0	0
Valid votes		146,293	100.00%	15	2	17
Rejected votes		2,098	1.41%			
Valid envelopes		148,391				
Rejected envelopes						
Total polled						
Registered electors		151,805				
