= 2002 Latvian parliamentary election =

Parliamentary election held in Latvia

- 5 October 2002
- All 100 seats in the Saeima; 51 seats needed for a majority
- Turnout: 77.03% (▲6.03 pp)
Party	Leader	Vote %	Seats	+/–
JL	Einars Repše	23.98	26	New
ForHRUL	Jānis Jurkāns	19.09	25	+9
TP	Andris Šķēle	16.69	20	−4
LPP	Ainārs Šlesers	9.57	10	New
ZZS	Ingrīda Ūdre	9.47	12	+12
TB/LNNK	Jānis Straume	5.39	7	−10
This lists parties that won seats. See the complete results below.
Results by district
Prime Minister before	Prime Minister after
Andris Bērziņš; Latvian Way	Einars Repše; New Era Party

Parliamentary elections were held in Latvia on 5 October 2002. The New Era Party emerged as the largest party in the Saeima, winning 26 of the 100 seats.

== Results ==
Party	Votes	%	Seats	+/–
New Era Party	237,452	23.98	26	New
For Human Rights in United Latvia	189,088	19.09	25	+9
People's Party	165,246	16.69	20	–4
Latvia's First Party	94,752	9.57	10	New
Union of Greens and Farmers	93,759	9.47	12	+12
For Fatherland and Freedom/LNNK	53,396	5.39	7	–10
Latvian Way	48,430	4.89	0	–21
Latvian Social Democratic Workers' Party	39,837	4.02	0	–14
Light of Latgale	15,948	1.61	0	New
Social Democratic Party	15,162	1.53	0	New
Social Democratic Welfare Party	13,234	1.34	0	New
Political Alliance "Centre" (Note: Political Alliance "Centre" was an alliance of Latvia's Democratic Party, the Workers' Party, For Freedom in Latvia and the Union of Latvian Farmers.)	5,819	0.59	0	New
Russian Party	4,724	0.48	0	New
Latvians' Party	3,919	0.40	0	New
Latvian Revival Party	2,558	0.26	0	New
Freedom Party	2,075	0.21	0	New
Mara's Land	1,446	0.15	0	New
Citizens' Union "Our Land"	1,349	0.14	0	0
Progressive Centre Party	1,229	0.12	0	New
Latvian United Republican Party	826	0.08	0	New
Total	990,249	100.00	100	0
Valid votes	990,249	99.25		
Invalid/blank votes	7,505	0.75		
Total votes	997,754	100.00		
Registered voters/turnout	1,295,287	77.03		
Source: Nohlen & Stöver

=== List of elected Deputies ===
Name	Alliance/party	Party	Constituency	Birth year	Votes
Aigars Kalvītis	TP	TP	Rīga	1966/01/27	6,510
Aigars Pētersons	JL	JL	Rīga	1959/07/28	3,288
Ainars Baštiks	LPP	LPP	Rīga	1958/10/26	12,303
Ainars Latkovskis	JL	JL	Vidzeme	1967/12/23	3,388
Ainārs Šlesers	LPP	LPP	Kurzeme	1970/01/22	12,371
Alberts Krūmiņš	JL	JL	Vidzeme	1949	2,576
Aleksandrs Bartaševičs	PCTVL	TSP	Latgale	1965/12/31	14,570
Aleksandrs Golubovs	PCTVL	TSP	Latgale	1959/06/15	9,895
Aleksandrs Kiršteins	TP	TP	Rīga	1948/08/27	5,904
Aleksejs Vidavskis	PCTVL	DPP	Latgale	1943/09/19	12,708
Anatolijs Mackevičs	PCTVL	TSP	Latgale	1956/01/18	8,842
Andis Kāposts	ZZS	LZS	Vidzeme	1960	3,675
Andrejs Aleksejevs	PCTVL	TSP	Zemgale	1966	2,079
Andrejs Klementjevs	PCTVL	LĪDZTIESĪBA	Rīga	1973/09/07	14,308
Andrejs Naglis	LPP	LPP	Latgale	1943/02/09	1,525
Andrejs Radzevičs	JL	JL	Kurzeme	1966/12/25	2,313
Andris Ārgalis	TP	TP	Vidzeme	1944/08/18	34,637
Andris Bērziņš	ZZS	IND	Zemgale	1955/11/26	7,077
Andris Šķēle	TP	TP	Vidzeme	1958/04/16	78,721
Andris Tolmačovs	PCTVL	LĪDZTIESĪBA	Vidzeme	1973/01/11	2,160
Anna Seile	TB/LNNK	TB/LNNK	Zemgale	1939/09/27	5,800
Anta Rugāte	TP	TP	Latgale	1949/04/16	7,457
Arnolds Laksa	LPP	LPP	Vidzeme	1963/06/29	12,709
Artis Kampars	JL	JL	Zemgale	1967/05/03	2,110
Arturs Krišjānis Kariņš	JL	JL	Vidzeme	1964/12/13	3,718
Arvīds Ulme	ZZS	LZP	Rīga	1947/05/13	3,441
Atis Slakteris	TP	TP	Vidzeme	1956/11/21	18,081
Augusts Brigmanis	ZZS	LZS	Zemgale	1952/07/19	9,675
Ausma Ziedone-Kantāne	JL	JL	Vidzeme	1941/11/10	32,682
Boriss Cilevičs	PCTVL	TSP	Rīga	1956/03/26	14,070
Dainis Turlais	PCTVL	TSP	Rīga	1950/11/24	19,782
Dzintars Ābiķis	TP	TP	Kurzeme	1952/06/03	17,221
Dzintars Zaķis	JL	JL	Zemgale	1970/05/26	1,966
Edgars Jaunups	JL	JL	Kurzeme	1979/07/15	4,265
Einars Repše	JL	JL	Rīga	1961/12/09	119,298
Elita Šņepste	TP	TP	Latgale	1962/12/09	1,380
Ērika Zommere	TP	TP	Zemgale	1946	1,392
Ēriks Jēkabsons	LPP	LPP	Vidzeme	1959/04/03	32,175
Ēriks Zunda	TP	TP	Zemgale	1950/09/22	1,421
Ģirts-Valdis Kristovskis	TB/LNNK	TB/LNNK	Vidzeme	1962/02/19	12,831
Gundars Bērziņš	TP	TP	Rīga	1952/06/03	17,221
Guntars Krasts	TB/LNNK	TB/LNNK	Rīga	1957/10/16	21,414
Igors Solovjovs	PCTVL	LSP	Rīga	1942	1,929
Ina Druviete	JL	JL	Rīga	1958/05/29	11,369
Ināra Ostrovska	JL	JL	Latgale	1955	1,510
Indulis Emsis	ZZS	LZP	Vidzeme	1952/01/02	9,768
Inese Šlesere	LPP	LPP	Kurzeme	1972/08/02	15,695
Ingrīda Circene	JL	JL	Kurzeme	1956/12/06	3,156
Inguna Rībena	JL	JL	Rīga	1956/07/24	18,532
Ivans Ribakovs	PCTVL	TSP	Latgale	1960/06/29	10,954
Jakovs Pliners	PCTVL	TSP	Rīga	1946/12/27	12,719
Jānis Esta	TP	TP	Zemgale	1945/09/11	1,385
Jānis Jurkāns	PCTVL	TSP	Rīga	1946/08/31	81,525
Jānis Lagzdiņš	TP	TP	Kurzeme	1952/06/15	16,729
Jānis Reirs	JL	JL	Zemgale	1961/09/23	2,022
Jānis Straume	TB/LNNK	TB/LNNK	Vidzeme	1962/08/27	11,626
Jānis Strazdiņš	ZZS	LZS	Rīga	1941/09/29	4,151
Jānis Urbanovičs	PCTVL	TSP	Rīga	1959/03/23	27,565
Jevgenija Stalidzāne	LPP	LPP	Zemgale	1944/12/17	4,880
Juris Dalbiņš	TP	TP	Vidzeme	1954/01/01	17,276
Juris Sokolovskis	PCTVL	LĪDZTIESĪBA	Rīga	1976/06/13	11,919
Kārlis Šadurskis	JL	JL	Rīga	1959/10/11	6,074
Kārlis Strēlis	JL	JL	Rīga	1943/03/16	2,879
Krišjānis Peters	LPP	LPP	Zemgale	1975/06/23	6,546
Leopolds Ozoliņš	ZZS	LZP	Kurzeme	1937/06/26	5,524
Liene Liepiņa	JL	JL	Vidzeme	1957/07/27	2,355
Linda Mūrniece	JL	JL	Zemgale	1970/05/28	1,845
Mareks Segliņš	TP	TP	Vidzeme	1970/07/04	27,700
Margarita Ūlande	ZZS	LZP	Vidzeme	1943	25,016
Māris Grīnblats	TB/LNNK	TB/LNNK	Kurzeme	1955/01/05	7,159
Māris Gulbis	JL	JL	Rīga	1971/09/23	33,506
Martijans Bekasovs	PCTVL	LSP	Latgale	1949/11/01	10,155
Mihails Pietkevičs	TP	TP	Zemgale	1973	956
Nikolajs Kabanovs	PCTVL	LSP	Rīga	1970/09/26	12,236
Oļegs Deņisovs	PCTVL	LSP	Vidzeme	1966/04/03	2,505
Oskars Kastēns	LPP	LPP	Vidzeme	1971/07/19	22,706
Paulis Kļaviņš	LPP	LPP	Rīga	1928/03/01	7,207
Pāvels Maksimovs	PCTVL	TSP	Latgale	1944	9,922
Pēteris Kalniņš	ZZS	LZP	Kurzeme	1952	3,478
Pēteris Ontužāns	JL	JL	Vidzeme	1951	3,381
Pēteris Tabūns	TB/LNNK	TB/LNNK	Latgale	1937/01/20	2,606
Raimonds Pauls	TP	TP	Vidzeme	1936/01/12	36,260
Rihards Pīks	TP	TP	Rīga	1941/12/31	6,720
Roberts Zīle	TB/LNNK	TB/LNNK	Rīga	1958/06/20	10,995
Sarmīte Ķikuste	JL	JL	Latgale	1962/12/20	1,342
Sergejs Fjodorovs	PCTVL	LSP	Latgale	1956/05/30	9,146
Silva Bendrāte	JL	JL	Kurzeme	1956/02/29	3,249
Silva Golde	TP	TP	Kurzeme	1955/08/04	10,438
Staņislavs Šķesters	ZZS	LZS	Latgale	1958/12/17	3,030
Uldis Mārtiņš Klauss	JL	JL	Vidzeme	1929/11/09	2,602
Valdis Dombrovskis	JL	JL	Rīga	1971/08/05	7,184
Valērijs Agešins	PCTVL	TSP	Kurzeme	1972/06/23	1,880
Valērijs Karpuškins	PCTVL	TSP	Rīga	1949/01/24	9,930
Viesturs Šiliņš	JL	JL	Vidzeme	1950	2,124
Vilis Krištopans	ZZS	LZS	Latgale	1954/05/03	19,649
Vilnis-Edvīns Bresis	ZZS	LZS	Vidzeme	1938/01/30	15,328
Vineta Muižniece	TP	TP	Kurzeme	1956/11/03	10,459
Vitālijs Orlovs	PCTVL	LĪDZTIESĪBA	Zemgale	1964/05/30	2,119
Vjačeslavs Stepaņenko	PCTVL	LĪDZTIESĪBA	Latgale	1977/08/08	10,594
Vladimirs Buzajevs	PCTVL	LĪDZTIESĪBA	Rīga	1951/10/08	12,930
Source: Overall results - Centrālā vēlēšanu komisija - CVK

== Aftermath ==
Voters severely punished the previous governing parties, with the People's Party and For Fatherland and Freedom both losing seats, while Latvian Way lost all its MPs.

A new coalition government was formed by the New Era Party, Latvia's First Party, For Fatherland and Freedom and the Union of Greens and Farmers. This enjoyed a parliamentary majority of 55 of the 100 MPs. However, after two years For Fatherland and Freedom left the coalition and was replaced by the People's Party, who returned to government after a two-year absence.
