= Andris Morozovs =

Latvian entrepreneur and politician

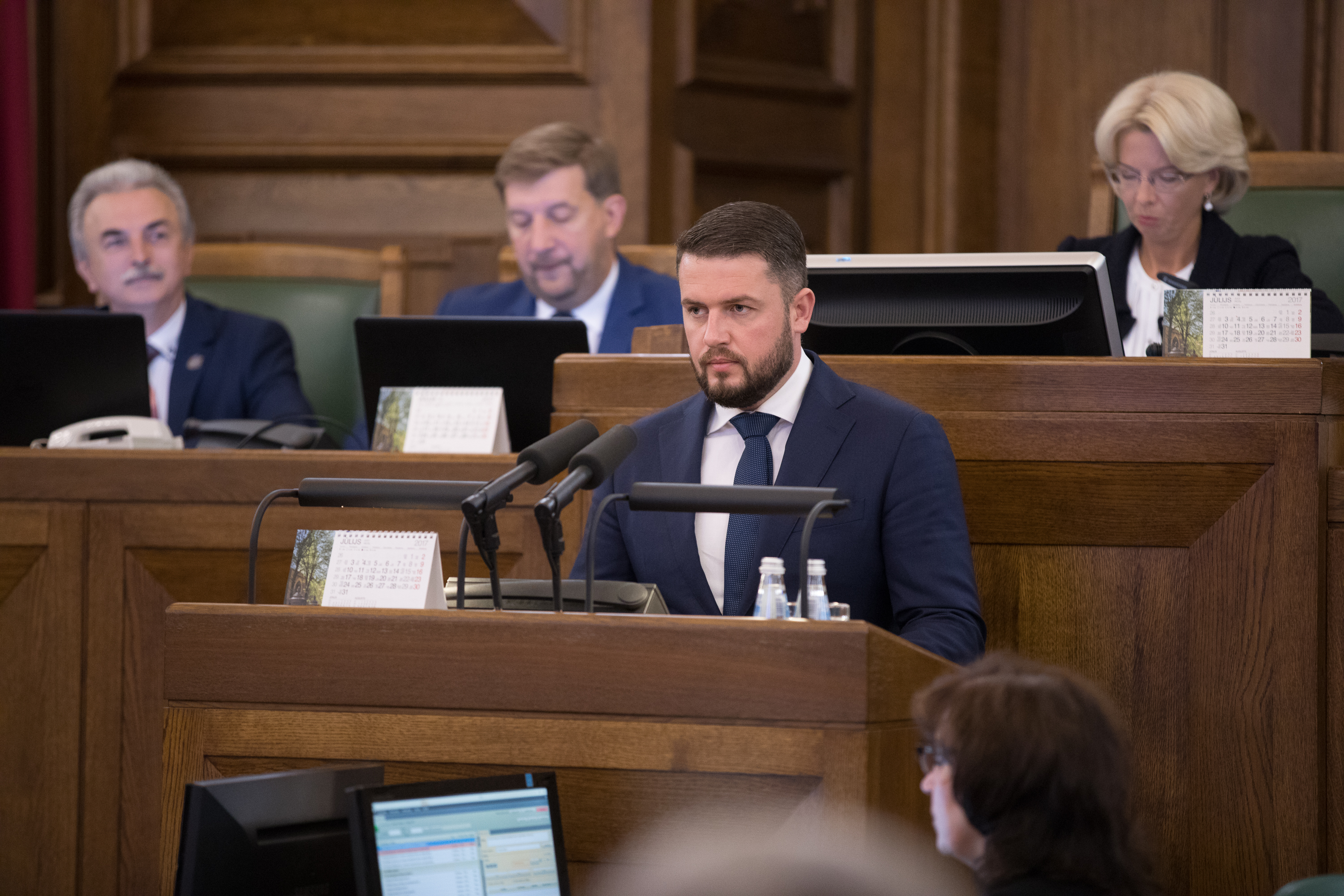
- Andris Morozovs in 2017

Member of the Riga City Council
- In office 2 October 2020 – 27 June 2025
- President: Egils Levits
- Prime Minister: Arturs Krišjānis Kariņš

Member of the 12th Saeima
- In office 13 July 2017 – 6 November 2018
- President: Raimonds Vējonis; Andris Bērziņš
- Prime Minister: Māris Kučinskis; Laimdota Straujuma

Personal details
- Born: 14 September 1982 (age 44) Riga, Latvian SSR, Soviet Union
- Party: Social Democratic Party "Harmony" (2010–2024); National Harmony Party (2008–2010)
- Education: RISEBA
- Occupation: Entrepreneur

Andris Morozovs (born September 14, 1982) is a Latvian entrepreneur and politician, representing the Harmony party. He served as a member of the 12th Saeima and is currently a member of the Riga City Council.

== Early life and education ==
Morozovs graduated from RISEBA in 2006 with a degree in business management.

He has served as the chairman of the Board of the Riga Central Market.

== Political career ==
Morozovs joined the National Harmony party in 2008. In 2014, he unsuccessfully ran for the 12th Saeima from the Harmony party list. In 2017, he became a member of the 12th Saeima, replacing Ņikita Ņikiforov. He served on the Education, Culture, and Science Committee, the Public Expenditure and Audit Committee, and the Education, Culture, and Science Committee's Sports Subcommittee.

In 2018, he unsuccessfully ran in the 2018 Latvian parliamentary elections and did not receive sufficient voter support in the 2019 European Parliament election in Latvia.

He was elected to the Riga City Council in the 2020 Riga City Council extraordinary elections.

After the failure of the Harmony party in the 14th Saeima elections, its leadership changed, and at the congress in January 2023, he was elected as one of the three co-chairs.
