= Oļegs =

Oļegs is a given name. Notable people with the name include:

- Oļegs Aleksejenko (born 1961), former Latvian international football midfielder
- Oļegs Antropovs (born 1947), Latvian former volleyball player
- Oļegs Blagonadeždins (born 1973), retired football defender from Latvia
- Oļegs Deņisovs (born 1966), Latvian politician
- Oļegs Karavajevs (born 1961), former Latvian football goalkeeper
- Oļegs Laizāns (born 1987), football midfielder from Latvia
- Oļegs Maļuhins (born 1969), Latvian biathlete who retired after the 2006 Turin Olympics
- Oļegs Malašenoks (born 1986), Latvian professional footballer
- Oļegs Sorokins (born 1974), Latvian professional ice hockey defender
- Oļegs Znaroks (born 1963), Latvian former ice hockey player
