= Jurģis Klotiņš =

Latvian politician (born 1985)

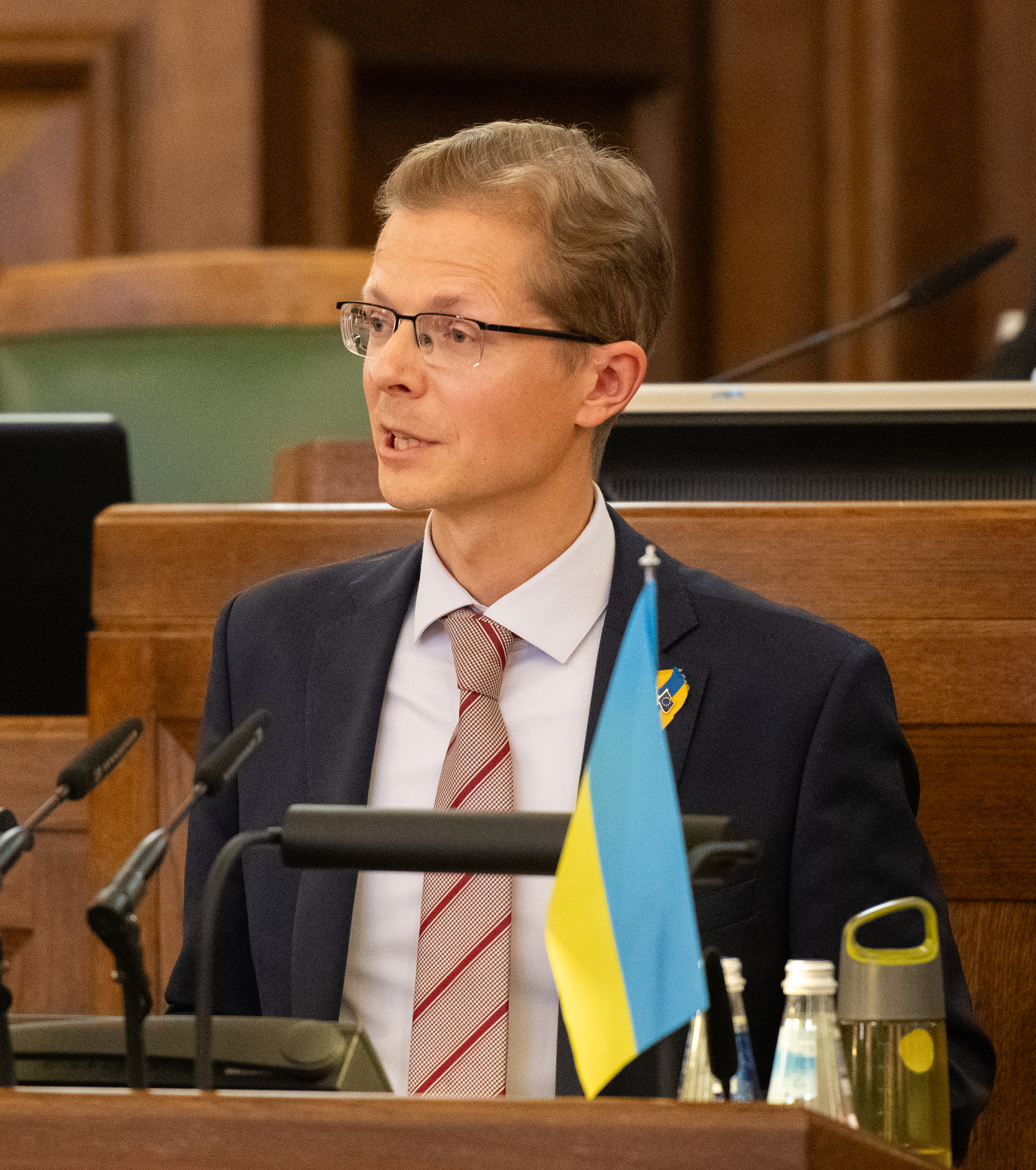
- Klotiņš in 2023

Member of the Saeima
- Incumbent
- Assumed office 25 July 2024
- Preceded by: Rihards Kols
- Constituency: Riga
- In office 15 December 2022 – 20 September 2023
- Preceded by: Ināra Mūrniece
- Succeeded by: Ināra Mūrniece
- Constituency: Riga

Personal details
- Born: 17 October 1985 (age 40)
- Party: National Alliance
- Education: Jāzeps Vītols Latvian Academy of Music; Latvian Academy of Culture

Jurģis Klotiņš (born 17 October 1985) is a Latvian politician of the National Alliance serving as a member of the Saeima. He first took office in 2022, replacing Ināra Mūrniece upon her appointment as minister of defence. He served until 2023, when Mūrniece left the cabinet and returned to the Saeima. In 2024, he replaced Rihards Kols in the Saeima, when Kols resigned to become a member of the European Parliament.
