= Solvita Āboltiņa =

Latvian politician (born 1963)

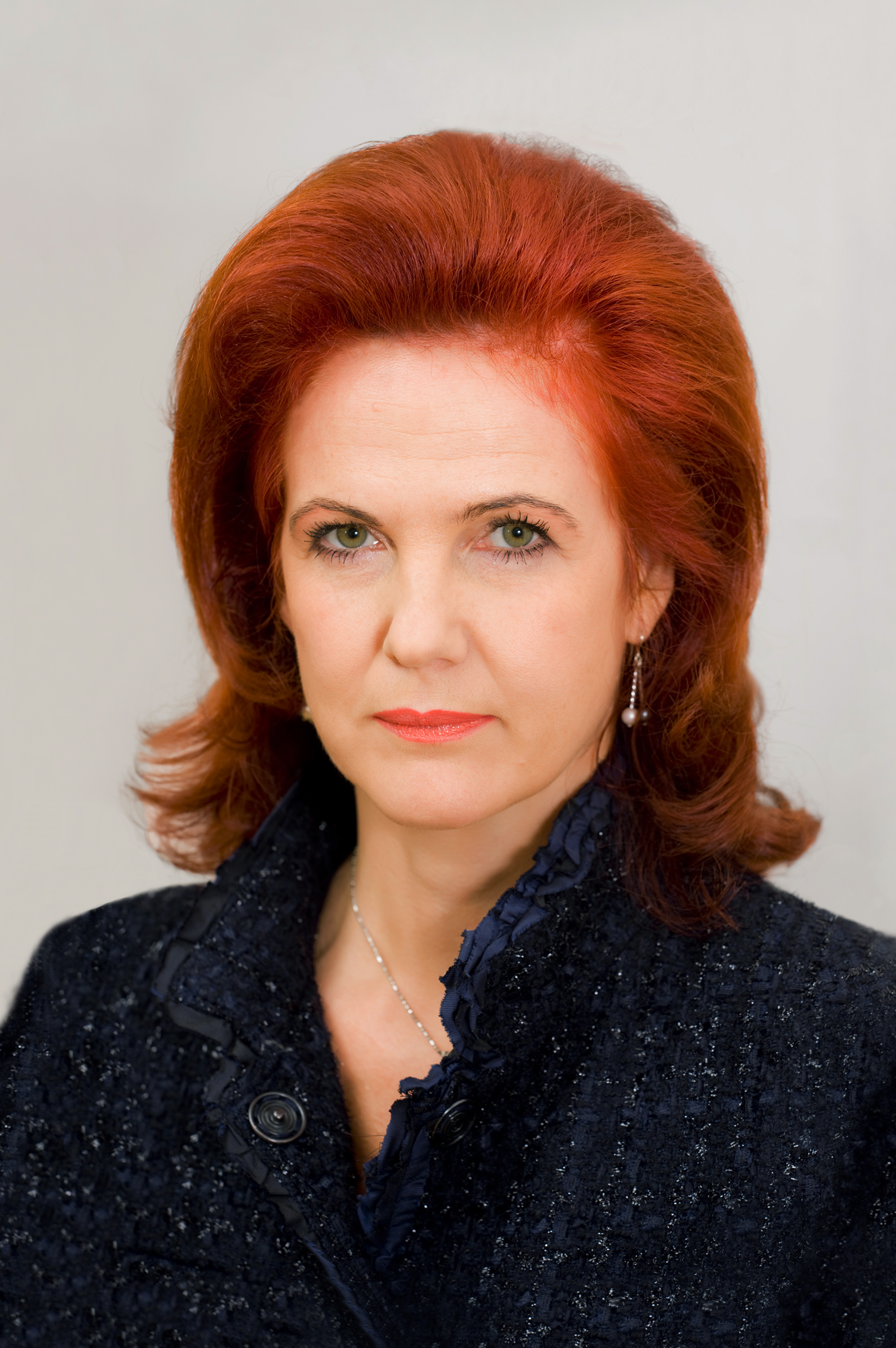
- Āboltiņa in 2010

Speaker of the Saeima
- In office 2 November 2010 – 4 November 2014
- Preceded by: Gundars Daudze
- Succeeded by: Ināra Mūrniece

Minister of Justice
- In office 2 December 2004 – 7 November 2006
- Prime Minister: Aigars Kalvītis
- Preceded by: Vineta Muižniece
- Succeeded by: Gaidis Bērziņš

Personal details
- Born: Solvita Mellupe; 19 February 1963 (age 63) Riga, Latvian SSR, Soviet Union
- Party: New Era (2002–2011); Unity (2011–present)
- Spouse: Jānis Āboltiņš
- Education: University of Latvia

Solvita Āboltiņa (née Mellupe; born 19 February 1963) is a Latvian politician who was Speaker of the Saeima from 2010 until 2014.

== Early life ==
Solvita Āboltiņa graduated from Riga Secondary School No. 5, a German language immersion school in 1981, and from the Faculty of Law at the Latvian State University in 1986.

== Political career ==
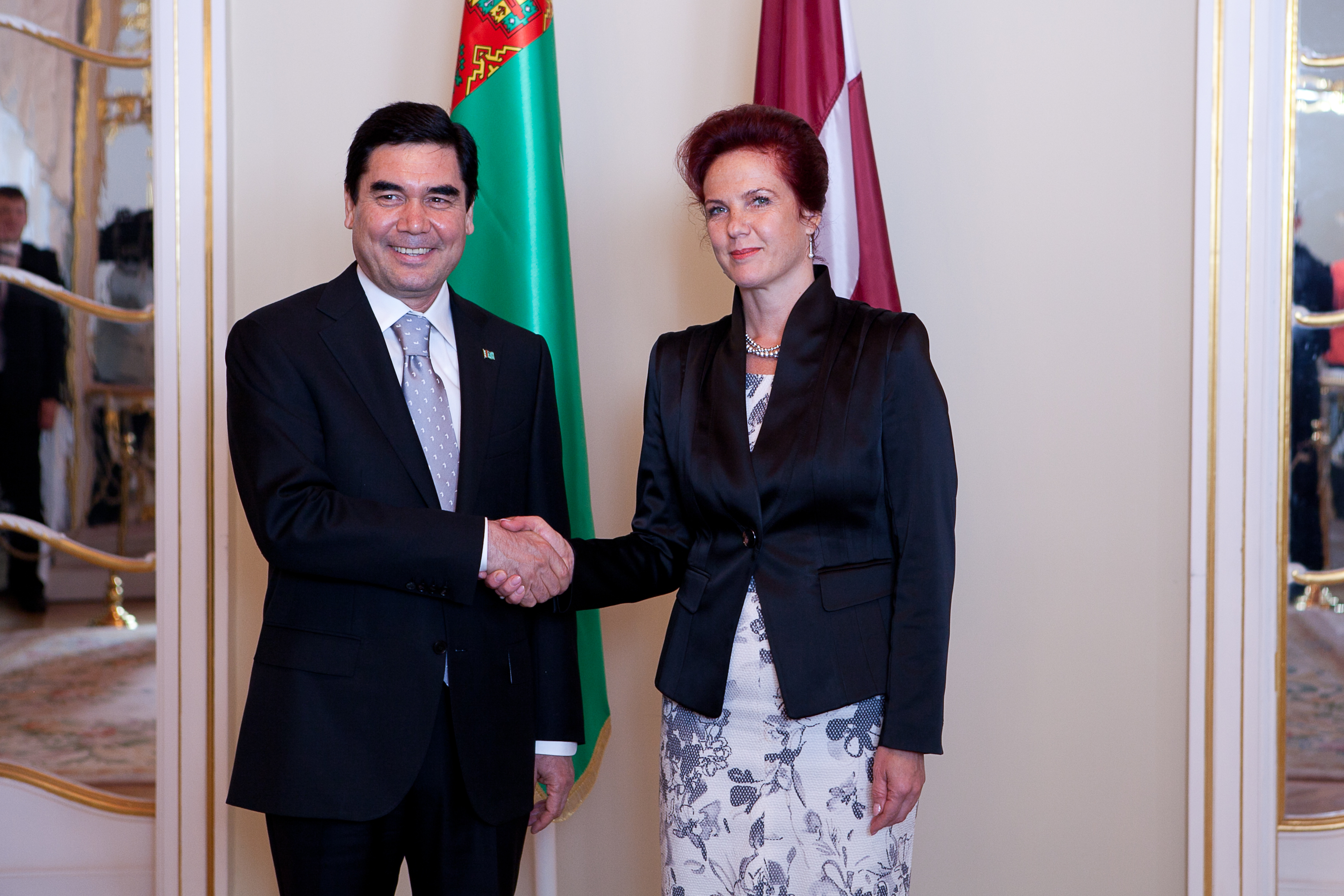
With the president of Turkmenistan

Āboltiņa entered politics in 2001. She became a deputy of the Saeima on November 7, 2006. In November 2014 after a parliamentary election she was replaced as the speaker and appointed chairwoman of the National Security Committee of the Saeima. She was struck off the Unity list of candidates by electors at the 2014 election. As a result, she did not return to the Saeima and Unity member Jānis Junkurs forfeited his mandate to allow the party President to continue to sit in parliament. At the emergency congress of the "Unity" party on June 4, 2016, she no longer applied for the position of chairman of the board. In November 2017, she was expelled from the party "for disregarding the party's internal discipline, deliberately undermining the authority of the party board and participating in behind-the-scenes negotiations with the aim of discrediting the process of selecting the minister of economy". At the end of the year, the mandate of the deputy was suspended.

== Honours ==
=== Foreign Honours ===
- Estonia: Recipient First Class of the Order of the Cross of Terra Mariana (05.06.2012, serie 1003 - decision n° 99)

Political offices
Preceded by Vineta Muižniece	Minister of Justice; 2004–2006	Succeeded by Gaidis Bērziņš
Preceded by Gundars Daudze	Speaker of the Saeima; 2010–2014	Succeeded by Ināra Mūrniece
