= Zane Skujiņa-Rubene =

Latvian politician (born 1993)

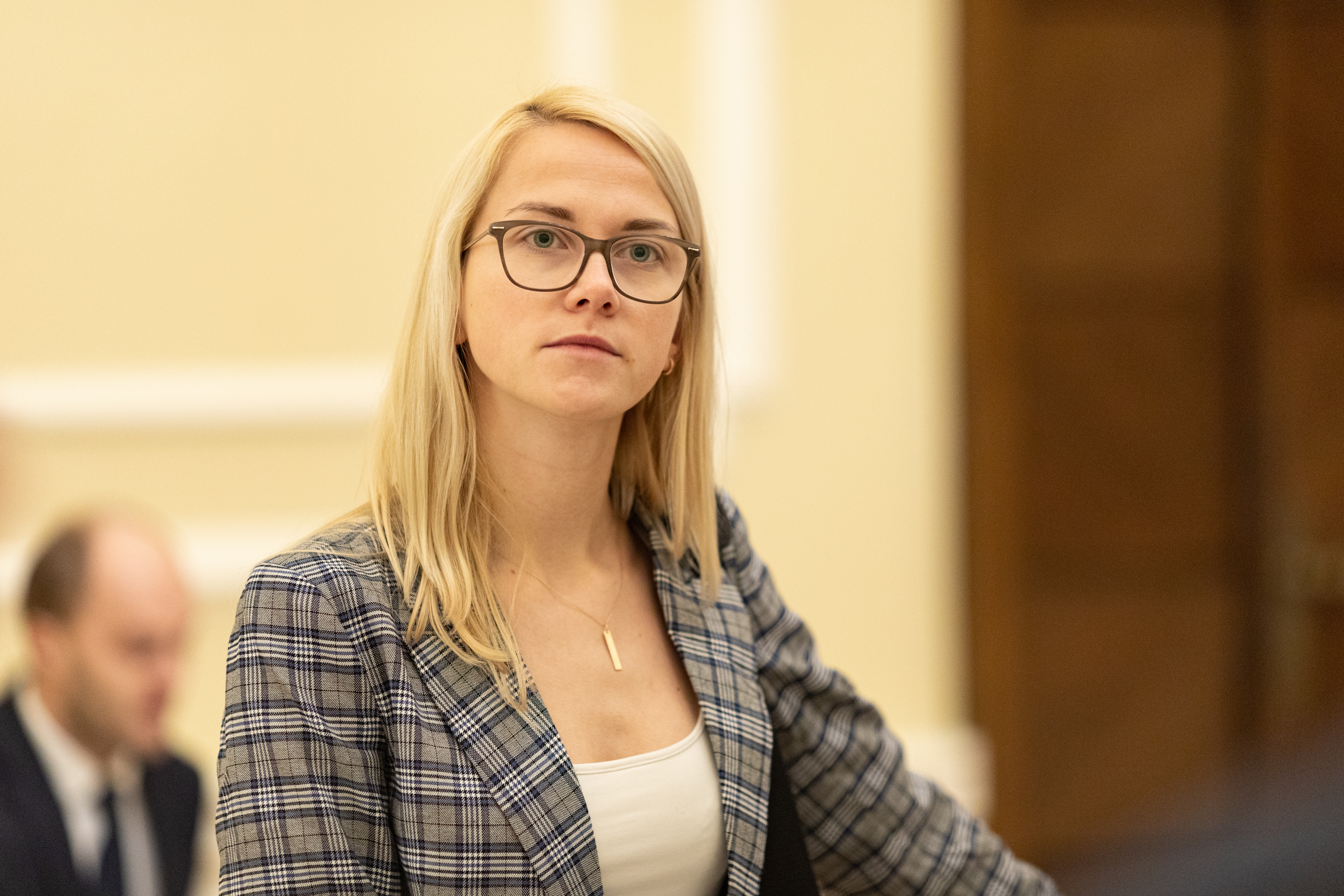
- Skujiņa-Rubene in 2023

Member of the Saeima
- Incumbent
- Assumed office 1 November 2022
- Constituency: Riga

Personal details
- Born: 29 June 1993 (age 33) Riga, Latvia
- Party: Unity
- Education: University of Latvia; Riga Stradins University

Zane Skujiņa-Rubene (née Skujiņa; born 29 June 1993) is a Latvian politician of Unity who was elected member of the Saeima in 2022. She previously worked as advisor to Minister of Welfare Jānis Reirs.
