= Agnese Krasta =

Latvian politician (born 1986)

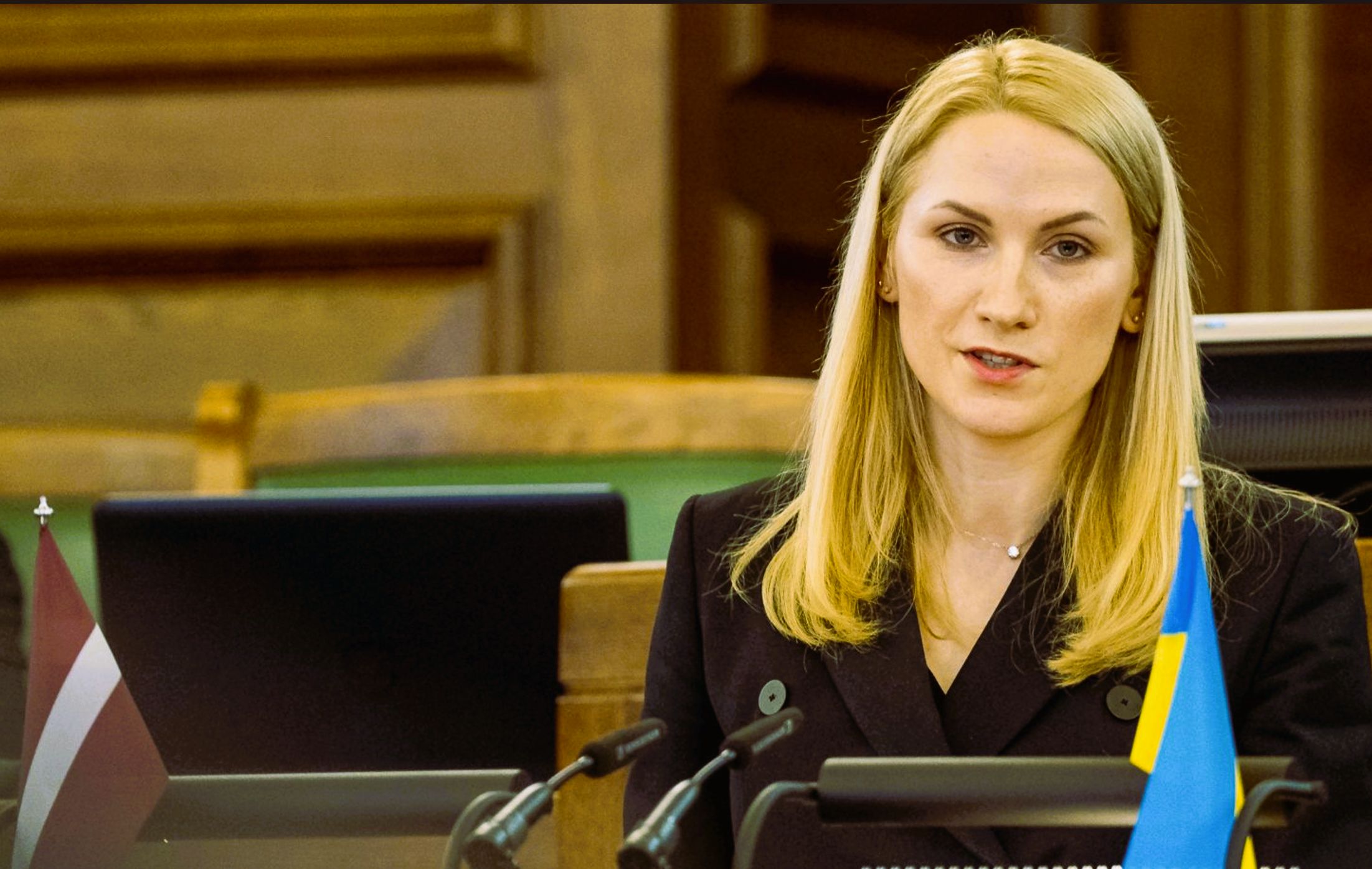
- Krasta in 2023

Member of the Saeima
- Incumbent
- Assumed office 1 November 2022
- Constituency: Riga

Personal details
- Born: 6 November 1986 (age 39)
- Party: Unity
- Education: University of Latvia

Agnese Krasta (born 6 November 1986) is a Latvian politician of Unity who was elected member of the Saeima in 2022. She previously worked as legal advisor to prime minister Krišjānis Kariņš.
