= Igors Zujevs =

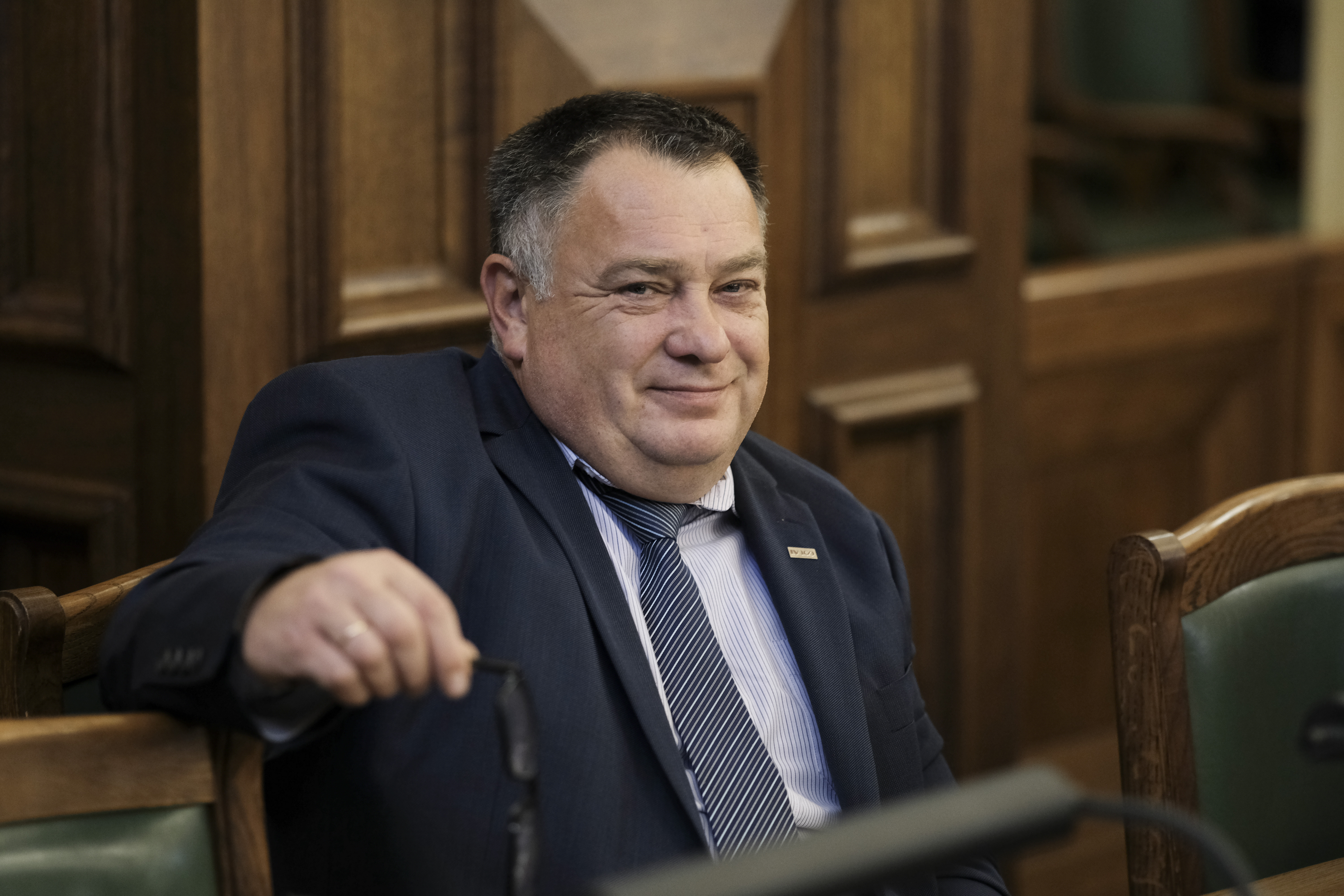
- Igors Zujevs in 2017

Member of the 12th Saeima
- In office May 7, 2015 – November 6, 2018
- President: Raimonds Vējonis; Andris Bērziņš

Member of the 11th Saeima
- In office October 17, 2011 – November 4, 2014
- President: Andris Bērziņš

Member of the 10th Saeima
- In office November 2, 2010 – October 16, 2011
- President: Valdis Zatlers

Personal details
- Born: January 31, 1963 (age 63)
- Party: Latvian Socialist Party
- Education: Baltic International Academy
- Occupation: ship technician

Igors Zujevs (born January 31, 1963) is a Latvian politician of Russian descent, representing the Latvian Socialist Party. He has been a deputy of the Saeima and the Riga City Council (elected from the Harmony Centre and Harmony party lists).

== Biography ==
He completed his general secondary education at Riga Secondary School No. 56, graduating in 1981. In 1983, he graduated from the Riga Maritime School with a specialization in ship technician. In 2011, he graduated from the Baltic International Academy.

He has been the chairman of the board of the association Labā Cerība, a member of the board of the horticultural company Vasara and the company Magone. He also worked in the companies Pļavnieku nami and Riga Central Market, as well as in Latvian Shipping Company.

== Political career ==
In the 2005 Latvian municipal elections, he ran for the Riga City Council elections from the joint list of the political patriotic association "Dzimtene" and the Latvian Socialist Party and was elected to the council. In 2006, he unsuccessfully ran for the 9th Saeima from the Harmony Centre party list. In 2009, he was re-elected to the Riga City Council from the Harmony Centre list. He worked in the Housing and Environment Committee and the Social Affairs Committee.

In 2010, he ran for the 10th Saeima from the Harmony Centre party list in the Riga electoral district and was elected to the 10th Saeima. In 2011, he was elected to the 11th Saeima in the 11th Saeima extraordinary elections where he served on the Social and Labor Affairs Committee and the Economic Committee.

Initially, he was not elected to the 12th Saeima from the Harmony party list, but in May 2015, he became a member of the 12th Saeima after Regīna Ločmele-Luņova resigned her mandate.

In a study by the investigative journalism center Re:Baltica on the deputies of the 12th Saeima, Zujevs was recognized as the "most silent Saeima deputy" because in the 38 months spent in the 12th Saeima, he did not speak once from the rostrum and only once prepared a report on a bill. In the autumn of 2018, he ran in the 13th Saeima elections from the Harmony party list but was not elected.
