= Rihards Kols =

Latvian politician

Rihards Kols MEP
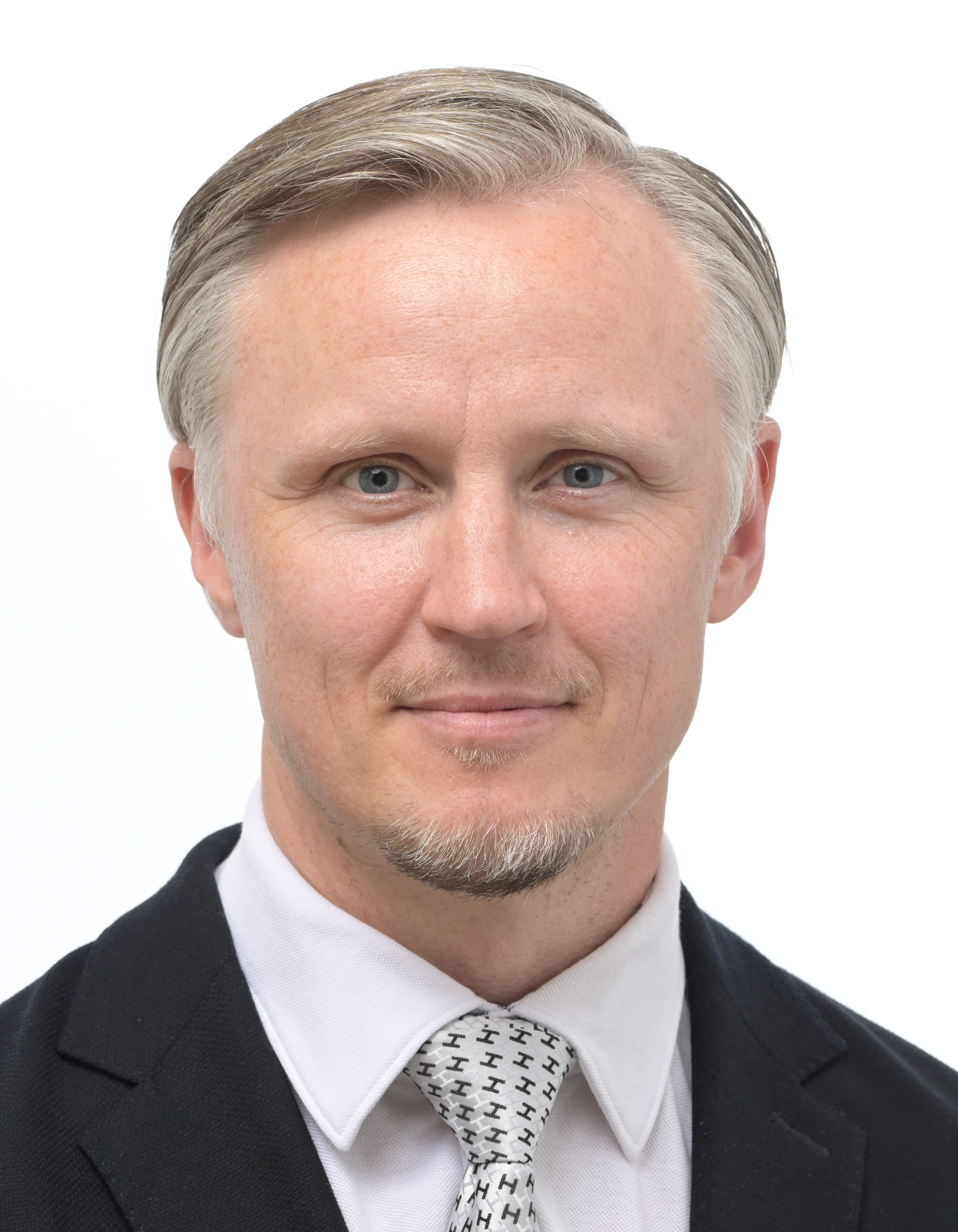
- Kols in 2024

Member of the European Parliament
- Incumbent
- Assumed office 16 July 2024
- Constituency: Latvia

Member of the Saeima
- In office 4 November 2014 – 15 July 2024
- Succeeded by: Jurģis Klotiņš
- Constituency: Livonia (2014–2018); Riga (2018–present)

Personal details
- Born: 16 December 1984 (age 41)
- Party: National Alliance (since 2013)
- Other political affiliations: European Conservatives and Reformists Party
- Education: Turība University; University of Westminster

Rihards Kols (born 16 December 1984) is a Latvian politician of the National Alliance who was elected member of the European Parliament in 2024. He was a member of the Saeima since 2014, serving as the Chairman of the Foreign Affairs Committee from 2018 to 2024. During his tenure, Kols led the Saeima delegation in the Parliamentary Assembly of the Organization for Security and Co-operation in Europe (OSCE) and represented the Saeima in the Organization for Economic Co-operation and Development (OECD).

Kols serves in the Latvian National Guard. Previously Rihards Kols also served as Parliamentary Secretary to Prime Minister Laimdota Straujuma.

== Education ==
Kols, born in Riga, attended Riga State Gymnasium Nr. 2 and Riga Commerce Gymnasium. In 2008 he graduated with distinction from the Turiba university earning a professional bachelor's degree in law, specialising in civil rights.

He continued his Master's studies in 2009/2010 at the University of Westminster in London, where he received a master's degree in diplomacy with a specialisation in foreign affairs analytics.

== Biography ==
In 2013, Kols joined the political party National Alliance "All for Latvia!" – "For Fatherland and Freedom/LNNK". In 2014 he was parliamentary secretary for the Ministry of Culture and took part in the European elections while being seated as number 3 on the party list (was not elected).

=== 12th Saeima ===
Kols was elected to the 12th Saeima in autumn 2014 from the Vidzeme constituency. After the government's approval, Kols became the first parliamentary secretary to Prime Minister Laimdota Straujuma. On 10 July 2015 Mrs. Straujuma signed an order to remove Kols from his post as Parliamentary Secretary due to the violation of the coalition agreement, as he had signed an opposition motion to convene an extraordinary meeting of the Saeima on the refugee issue.

In the 12th Saeima he also served as a Member to the Chairman of the Foreign Affairs Committee and was a Member of the European Affairs Committee. Kols chaired a working group that organised a discussion cycle in the Saeima on the Transatlantic Trade and Investment Partnership, or TTIP. Kols also drafted the Diaspora law and headed the working group set up under the auspices of the Foreign Affairs Committee for the development of the Diaspora law. The bill was adopted on 6 November 2018.

In 2018, in a call to Russia to respect human rights, Kols initiated the introduction of the so-called Magnitsky list in Latvia, which as an end-result prohibited the entry into Latvia to 49 persons related to the Sergei Magnitsky case.

In 2018, Kols submitted amendments to the Law on Public Procurement, which prohibited offshore companies from participating in public procurement. The law was adopted on 26 April 2018. Also in 2018, amendments to the Labor Law were developed and submitted to the Saeima, which would make it mandatory for employers to indicate the expected salary range in job advertisements. The law was adopted on 1 November 2018.

=== 13th Saeima ===
For the 13th Saeima elections, Rihards Kols ran as the second number in the Riga constituency and the party's candidate for the position of the Foreign minister. After being elected to the Saeima, Kols became the Chairman of the Foreign Affairs Committee. Was a candidate at the European parliament elections, but was not elected.

Kols, as a member of the 13th Saeima and Chairman of the Foreign Affairs Committee, established a joint cooperation platform for the Chairmen of the Foreign Affairs Committees of the Baltic, Visegrád, NATO and EU parliaments, regular communication and coordination of political priorities. He also established and led cooperation groups with the United States and Great Britain, as well as participated in the establishment of the cooperation group of deputies of the International Crimean Platform, later elected as its chairman.

Together with parliamentarians and Chairs of the Foreign Affairs Committees of other countries, he actively stood up against authoritarian regimes, constantly responding to the migrant crisis organized by Lukashenko on the borders of Lithuania, Latvia and Poland and the forced landing of Ryanair flight 4978 in Minsk on 23 March 2021. Under his leadership, the reaction of the Chairmen of the Foreign Affairs Committees of the European and US parliaments was achieved, which also affects the EU's action and security support.

Kols, along with his European and US allies, opposed the Nord Stream 2 project and strongly criticized the decision of the Parliamentary Assembly of the Council of Europe to restore Russia's voting rights. He also actively represented Ukraine's interests in international organizations that promote diplomatic, military, and humanitarian support.

==== Legislative initiatives ====
Under Kols' leadership, several legislative initiatives were proposed and implemented during the 13th Saeima. One of the most important steps was the liquidation of the temporary residence permit sales program, which had previously raised concerns about potential threats to national security. Under Kols' leadership, the Saeima decided not to join the UN Global Compact on Migration. The practical implementation of the Diaspora Law was also promoted, facilitating the recognition of regulated professions and allowing Latvian citizens living abroad to declare an additional place of residence, thus strengthening their ties with their homeland.

In September 2022, Kols submitted amendments to the Immigration Law that would suspend the renewal of temporary residence permits for Russian and Belarusian citizens who had obtained them through investment or the purchase of real estate in Latvia, citing the inevitably heightened risks associated with the immigration of Russian and Belarusian citizens to Latvia.

==== Saeima Foreign Affairs Committee ====
In the field of foreign policy, the Foreign Affairs Committee, led by Kols, was actively involved in defending Latvia's interests in the international arena. One of the most important successes was ensuring the rights of Latvian citizens in the United Kingdom after Brexit. An audit of the Latvian-Russian and Latvian-Belarusian treaties was also conducted, which paved the legal way for the demolition of the Monument to the Liberators of Soviet Latvia and Riga from the German Fascist Invaders in Pārdaugava. The Commission consistently advocated for the international isolation of Russia and Belarus, providing political support to the opposition, civil society and dissidents of these countries.

In response to Russia's aggression in Ukraine, Kols pushed for the strengthening of sanctions and facilitated the supply of weapons to Ukraine. Under his leadership, Latvia recognized Russia as a state sponsor of terrorism and condemned Russia's aggression in Ukraine as a targeted genocide against the Ukrainian people. An important step was also taken in restoring historical justice - the Saeima recognized the Crimean Tatar and Armenian genocides.

=== 14th Saeima ===
Rihards Kols was elected to the 14th Saeima in autumn 2022, where he served as the Chairman of the Foreign Affairs Committee.

In 2023, Kols drafted and submitted amendments to the Pre-election Campaign Law requiring paid pre-election campaigns to be conducted in the official state language only. The amendments were adopted.

Taking part in a session of the Parliamentary Assembly of the Organisation for Security and Co-operation in Europe (OSCE PA) as the Head of the delegation of the Saeima, he publicly expressed his displeasure of the presence of Russian representatives at the session, stating that Austria has allowed Russian representatives, who are on the European Union sanctions list to participate. In his speech, Kols elaborated that the participation of Russian delegates in this OSCE session was an embarrassment and contradicted the OSCE's postulated principles and values. Kols ended his speech with quoting the famous response of Ukrainian border guards to Russia's warship, which was about to attack Snake Island, "Russian warship, go fuck yourself."

On 9 August 2023, shortly before announcing his resignation as Prime Minister on 14 August, Krišjānis Kariņš proposed reshuffling three ministerial portfolios within the incumbent government in an effort to improve its working dynamics, suggesting that Kols take over as Minister of Foreign Affairs.

=== European Parliament ===
In the 2024 European parliament elections in Latvia, Rihards Kols was elected as Member of the European Parliament. Although he was placed third on the list, he received more votes than Ināra Mūrniece, a former Speaker of the Saeima and former Minister of Defence, who was placed one position above him.

Kols joined the European Conservatives and Reformists Group and works as a member in the European Parliament Committee on Foreign Affairs and European Parliament Committee on International Trade, and as a substitute member in the European Parliament Committee on Industry, Research and Energy. Kols is also part of the European Parliament delegation to the EU-Chile Joint Parliamentary Committee and a substitute member in the European Parliament delegation for relations with the United States and the delegation to the Parliamentary Assembly of the Union for the Mediterranean.

During his first year in the European Parliament, Rihards Kols submitted 49 motions for resolutions, including on the return of Ukrainian children, Russia’s “shadow fleet”, the situation in Georgia, and the defence of the European Union. He made 41 contributions to plenary debates, focusing on the war in Ukraine, EU–US relations, border security, and hybrid threats.

During his second year in the European Parliament, Kols submitted 37 motions for resolutions, made 29 contributions to plenary debates, and submitted 20 questions to the European Commission and the Council.

The motions for resolutions concerned, among other issues, the situation of political prisoners in Belarus and Cuba, Russia’s war against Ukraine, provocations in the Baltic region, and the suppression of protests in Iran.

== Civic engagement ==
In 2012, Kols founded the Association of Latvian Students in the United Kingdom and served as its secretary-general. He interned with the Russia and Eurasia Programme at the Royal Institute of International Affairs (Chatham House) and worked as an international affairs consultant at the Latvian-British Chamber of Commerce from 2010 to 2011. As an intern, he participated in organising World NGO Day in London from 2011 to 2012. Since 2014, he has served as a board member of the Youth Competence Centre.

In 2014, Rihards Kols founded the Latvian Flag association and served as chairman of its board until 2022. The association’s stated aim is to promote respect for Latvia’s national symbols and strengthen national identity, with particular emphasis on the national flag. One of its most significant projects was the installation of a monumental Latvian flag on the AB jetty in Riga. Following a public vote in which nearly 4,000 people participated, the site was selected as the most suitable location for the flag. The project was funded entirely through private donations, with businesspeople Armands Garkāns, Juris Kravalis, Jānis Kols, and Māris Martinsons serving as its patrons. The flagpole is 60 metres high and flies a 20-by-10-metre red-white-red flag. It was unveiled on 18 October 2017 as a gift to Riga and Latvia ahead of the country’s centenary. Similar monumental Latvian flagpoles have been constructed in other Latvian cities: Ogre, Smiltene, Valka, Limbaži, Liepāja, Sigulda, Cēsis, and Alūksne.
