= Light of Latgale =

Latvian political party

The Light of Latgale (Latvian: Latgales Gaisma; Latgalian: Latgolys Gaisma) was a Latgalian regionalist political party in Latvia.

The Light of Latgale was based in the city of Daugavpils and led by Daugavpils businessman Rihards Eigims. The party won the 2001 municipal elections in Daugavpils, with Eigims becoming the city's mayor. Eigims was the mayor until 2003 when he lost a confidence vote in the city council, after several city council members defected from The Light of Latgale. The Light of Latgale was the main opposition party in the Daugavpils city council until 2005.

The party was less successful outside Daugavpils. It held one seat on the city council of Krāslava. It failed to win seats in municipal elections elsewhere in Latgale. At the legislative elections on 5 October 2002, the party won 1.6% of the popular vote and no seats. The party disbanded on 7 February 2007.
