= Inga Bite =

Latvian politician

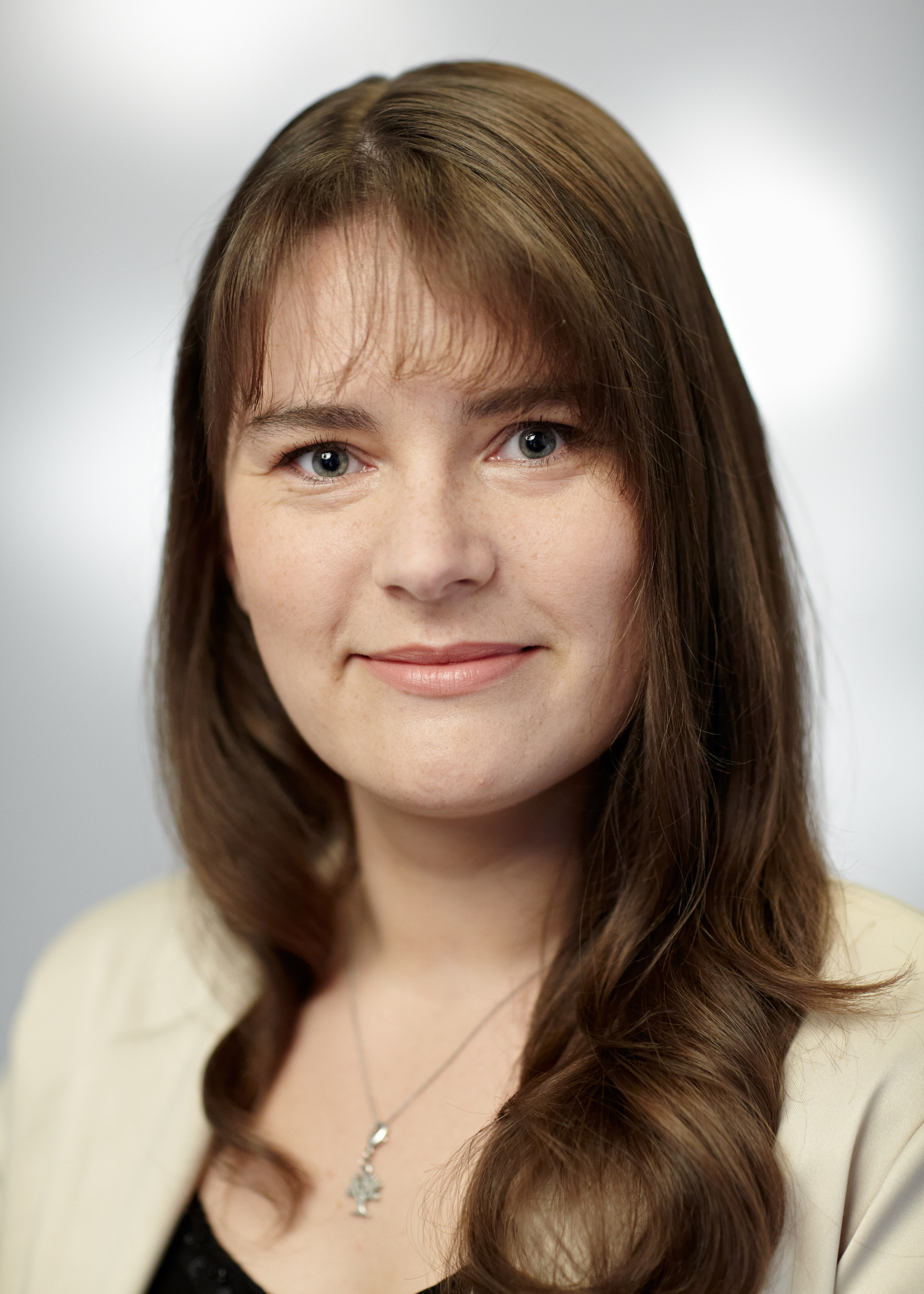

Deputy of the Saeima

Personal details
- Born: 6 July 1981 (age 45)
- Party: Latvian Association of Regions (Since 2014)
- Other political affiliations: Zatlers' Reform Party
- Spouse: Māris Bite
- Children: 2
- Education: University of Latvia
- Profession: Lawyer

Inga Bite (born 6 July 1981) is a Latvian politician. She is the member of the Zatlers' Reform Party and a deputy of the 11th Saeima (Latvian Parliament). She began her current term in parliament on 17 October 2011. She has graduated from University of Latvia.
