= Sergejs Mirskis =

Latvian politician

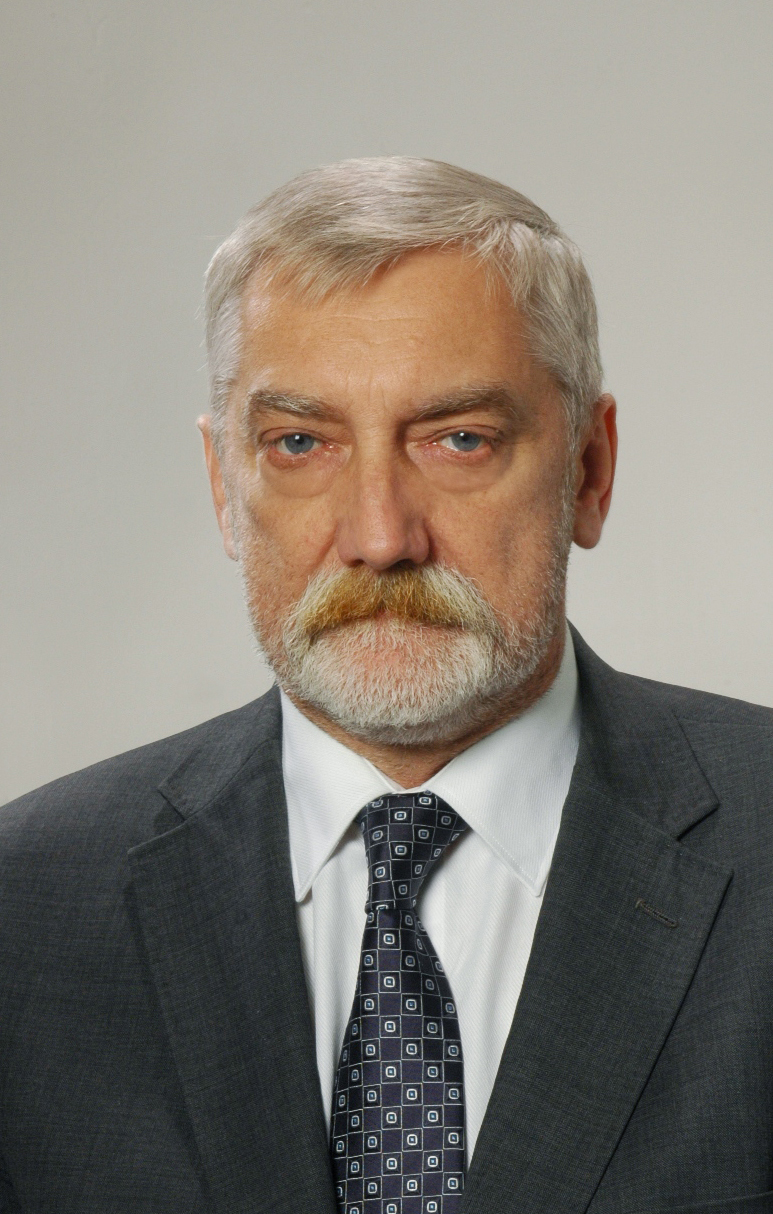

Deputy of the Saeima

Personal details
- Born: 1 January 1952 (age 74) Ādaži, Latvian SSR
- Party: Harmony
- Other political affiliations: National Harmony Party

Sergejs Mirskis (born 1 January 1952), is a Latvian politician. He is a member of Harmony and a deputy of the 10th, 11th and 12th Saeima. He began his current term in parliament on November 18, 2010. He is of partial German descent.

== Lifestyle ==
Born in 1952 in the family of Vladimir Mirsky, a teacher and later assistant professor of Russian literature at LVU, and his wife Irina, née Ose. He declared his nationality as German.

He studied at the Riga 53rd Secondary School, graduating in 1969.

He was active in the association "Union of Russian Compatriots in Latvia", was a member of its presidium, as well as in the association "Music and Poetry Club". He was a manager of the company "Structors".

== Political activity ==
S. Mirsky ran unsuccessfully in the 2001 Riga City Council elections on the list of the Russian Party, in the 8th Saeima elections on the list of the PCTVL and in the 2005 Riga City Council elections on the list of the People's Harmony Party.
