= Social Democratic Welfare Party =

Political party in Latvia

The Social Democratic Welfare Party (Latvian: Sociāldemokrātiskā Labklājības partija, SDLP) was a minor social-democratic political party in Latvia which was established in 2002 and led by currency exchange businessman Juris Žuravļovs.

It was previously called the Welfare Party (Latvian: Labklājības partija), which was founded by Žuravļovs in 1999 and won 3,04% of the vote and two seats in the Riga City Council during the 1999 Latvian municipal elections. It was renamed to SDLP just before the 2002 Latvian parliamentary election, in which the party won 1.4% of the popular vote but no seats. In the run up to the 2004 European Parliament election the party was renamed as the United Social Democratic Welfare Party (Latvian: Apvienotā sociāldemokrātiskā Labklājības partija, ASDLP) and received 2,23% of the vote, well below the 5% margin.

In 2004 the ASDLP, the "For Freedom, Social Justice and Equal Rights" party and the Latvian Youth Party formed the SDK Motherland alliance. The parties gradually merged and the ASDLP failed to re-register after changes in legislation and was dissolved in 2008.
