= Kārlis Šadurskis =

Latvian politician (born 1959)

Kārlis Šadurskis MEP
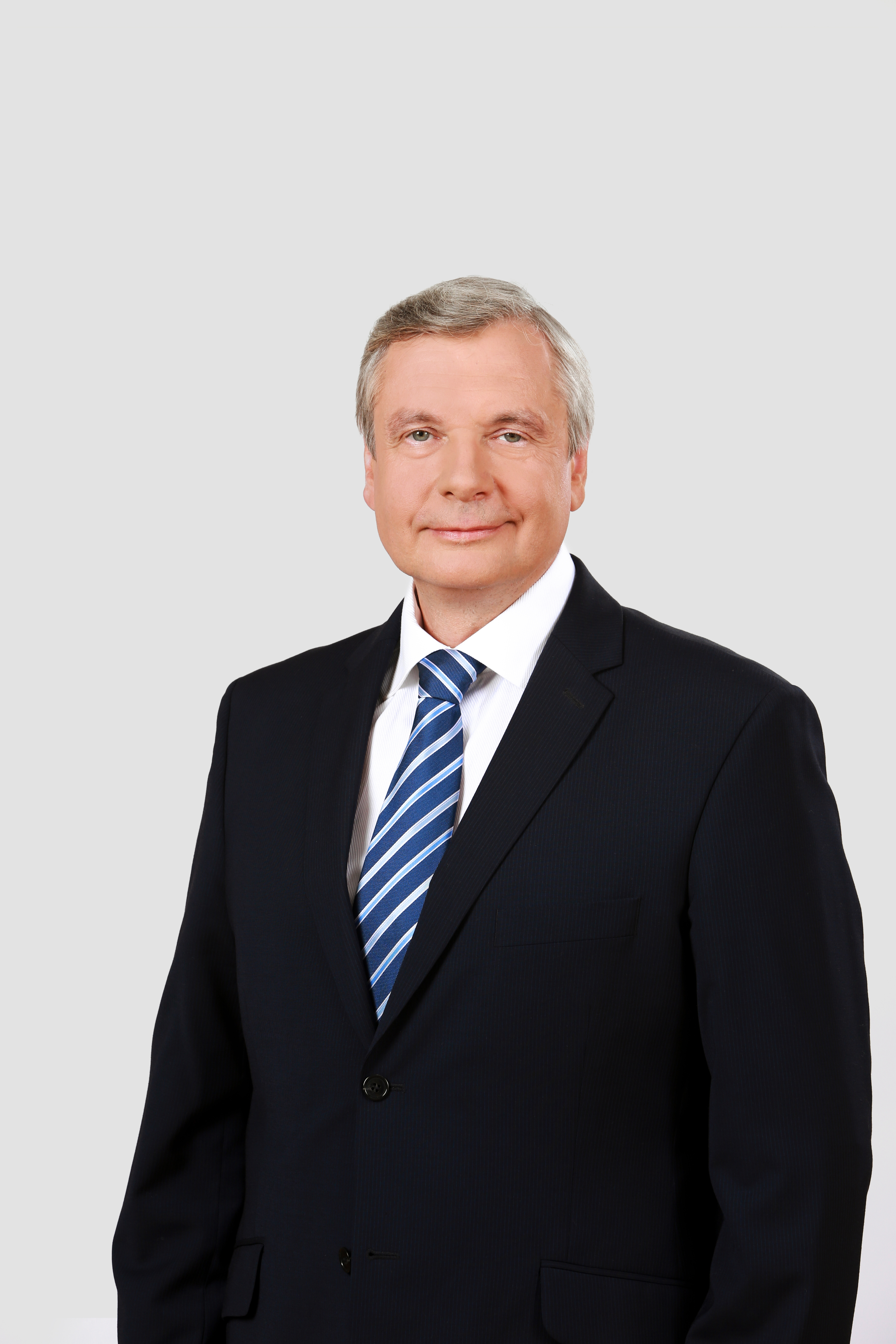

Member of the European Parliament for Latvia
- In office 1 December 2011 – 30 June 2014 Serving with 8 others

Personal details
- Born: 11 October 1959 (age 66) Riga, Latvia
- Party: LNNK; New Era Party (2002–2008); Civic Union (2008–2011); Unity (2008–present)
- Education: Riga Technical University; University of Latvia

Kārlis Šadurskis (born 11 October 1959) is a Latvian politician, who was a Member of the European Parliament for Latvia from 2011 until 2014. He is a member of the Unity party and sat with the European People's Party in the European Parliament.

== Education and career ==
Šadurskis graduated mathematical engineering from Riga Technical University in 1982. He subsequently graduated as a doctor of technology 1986 and as a doctor of mathematics from the University of Latvia in 1992. He served as a senior research fellow, assistant professor, teacher, associate professor at the Riga Technical University from 1986. He also served in various other academic roles.

He was elected to the Saeima in 2002, and served until 2011. He was the Minister of Education and Science of Latvia from 2002 to 2004. He later served as Parliamentary Secretary to the Ministry of Defence of Latvia from 2009 until 2010. He was Secretary of the Latvian Parliament from 2010 to 2011.

== Parliamentary service ==
- Delegation for relations with South Africa (2011–2014)
- Committee on the Environment, Public Health and Food Safety (2011–2012, 2012–2014)
