= Juris Dalbiņš =

Latvian politician

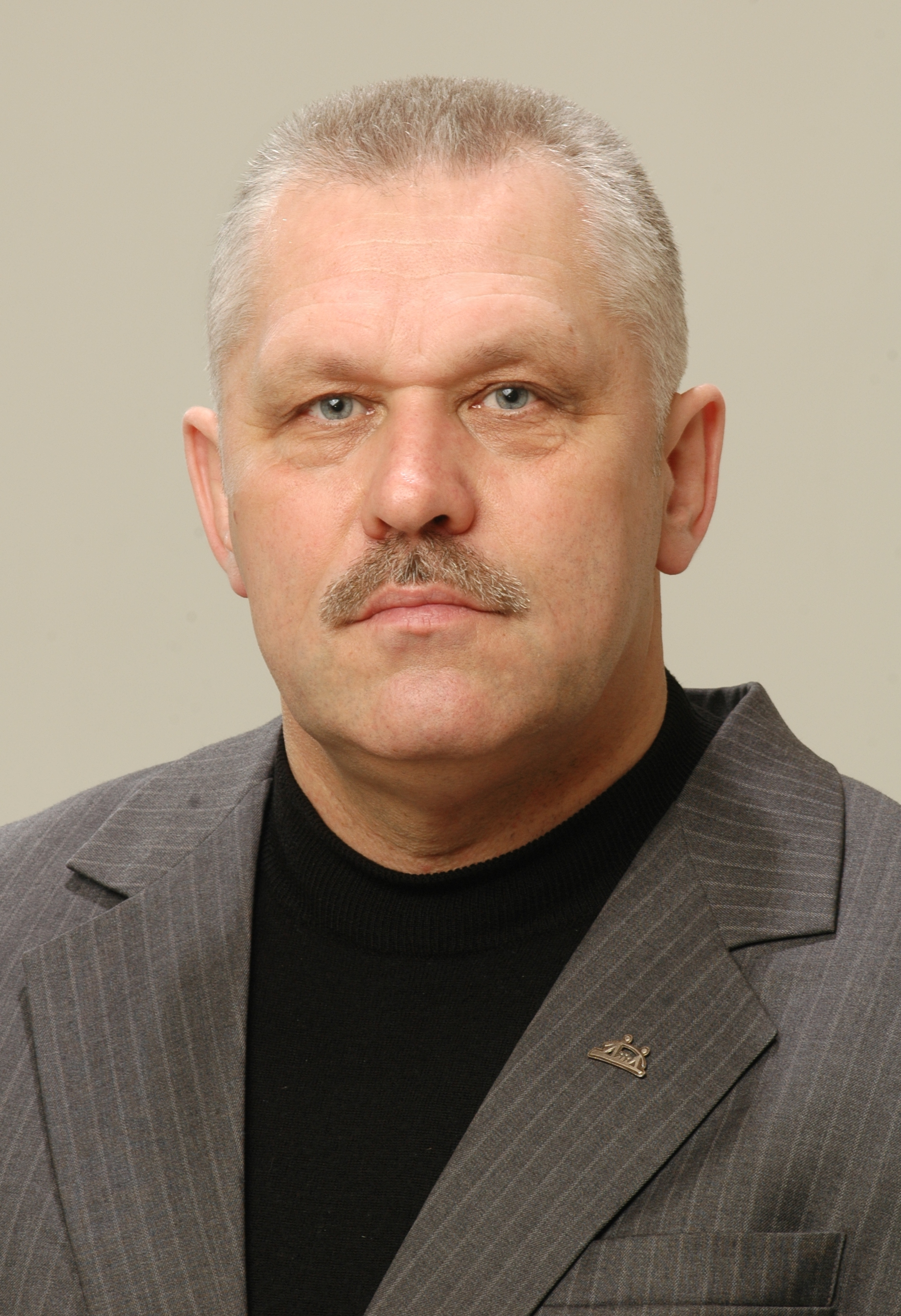
Juris Dalbiņš

Juris Dalbiņš (born January 1, 1954, in Dobele) is a Latvian politician and a Deputy of the Saeima. He is a member of the People's Party.
