= Andrejs Klementjevs =

Latvian politician (born 1973)

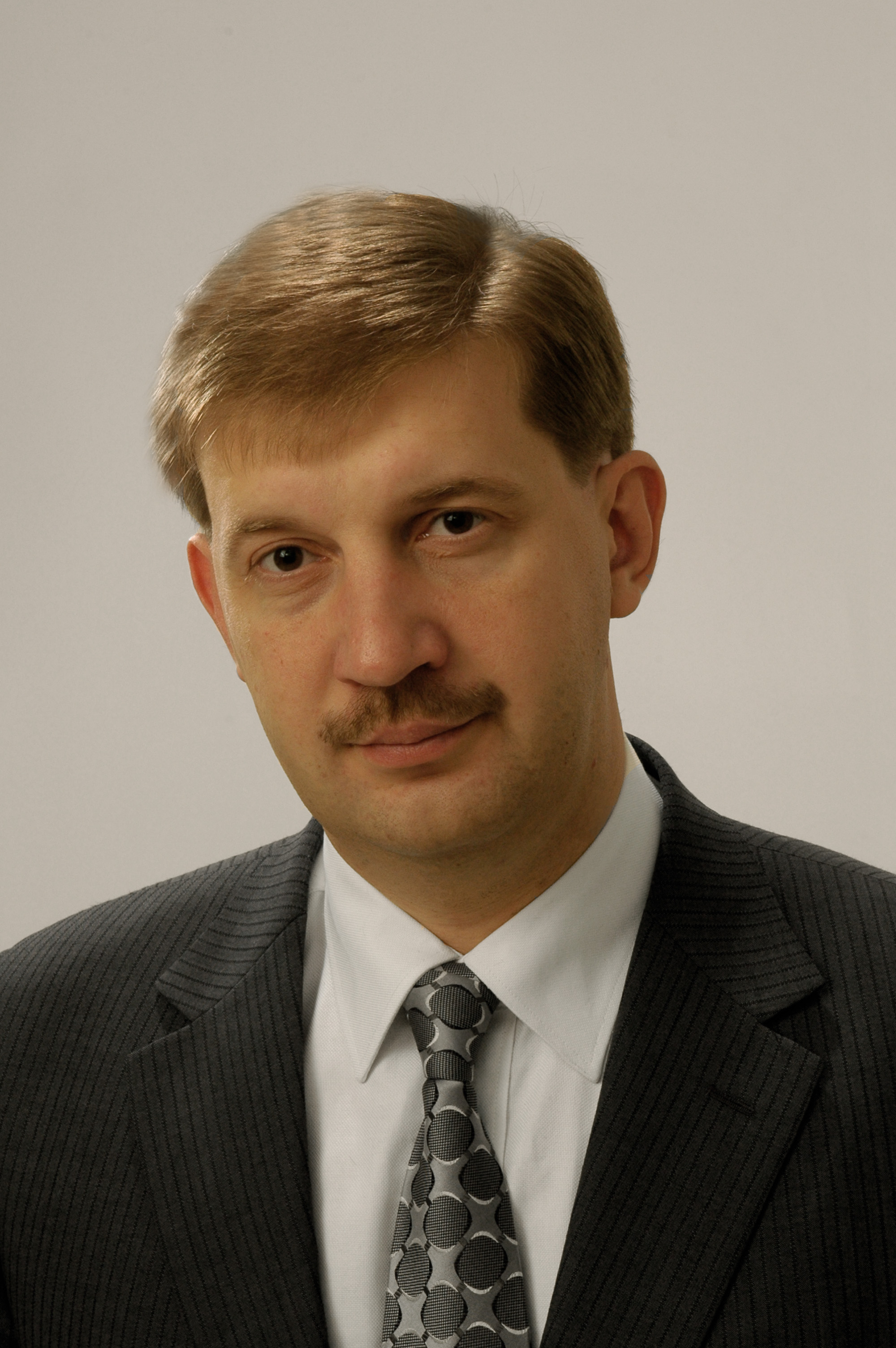

Deputy of the Saeima

Personal details
- Born: 7 September 1973 (age 53) Rīga, Latvia
- Party: Harmony
- Education: University of Latvia; Riga Aviation University

Andrejs Klementjevs (born 7 September 1973, in Riga) is a Latvian politician of Russian origin. He is a member of Harmony and a deputy of the 11th Saeima.

== Education ==
2009–2011 University of Latvia, Faculty of Economics and Management, master's degree programme in Public Administration, master's degree in social sciences

1998 Graduated from the Riga Aviation University, bachelor's degree in economics

== Work experience ==
2011 Member of the 11th Saeima, Deputy Speaker of the Saeima Member of the Social Affairs and Employment Matters Committee; member of the Administrative Committee Specialised in social issues, health protection, employment legislation, and national security

2010–2011 Member of the 10th Saeima, Deputy Speaker of the Saeima Member of the Social Affairs and Employment Matters Committee; member of the Administrative Committee

2006–2010 Member of the 9th Saeima, Deputy Secretary of the Saeima Member of the Social Affairs and Employment Matters Committee; member of the National Security Committee Specialised in social issues, health protection, employment legislation, and national security

2002–2006 Member of the 8th Saeima

1998–2002 Member of the 7th Saeima

1994–1998 Inspector (police lieutenant) at the Criminal Police Unit of the Ministry of the Interior

in 1992 Inspector at the Social Security Department of the Executive Board of the Latgale District of the Riga City Council

== Marital status ==
He was married and had two sons.
