= Regīna Ločmele =

Latvian politician

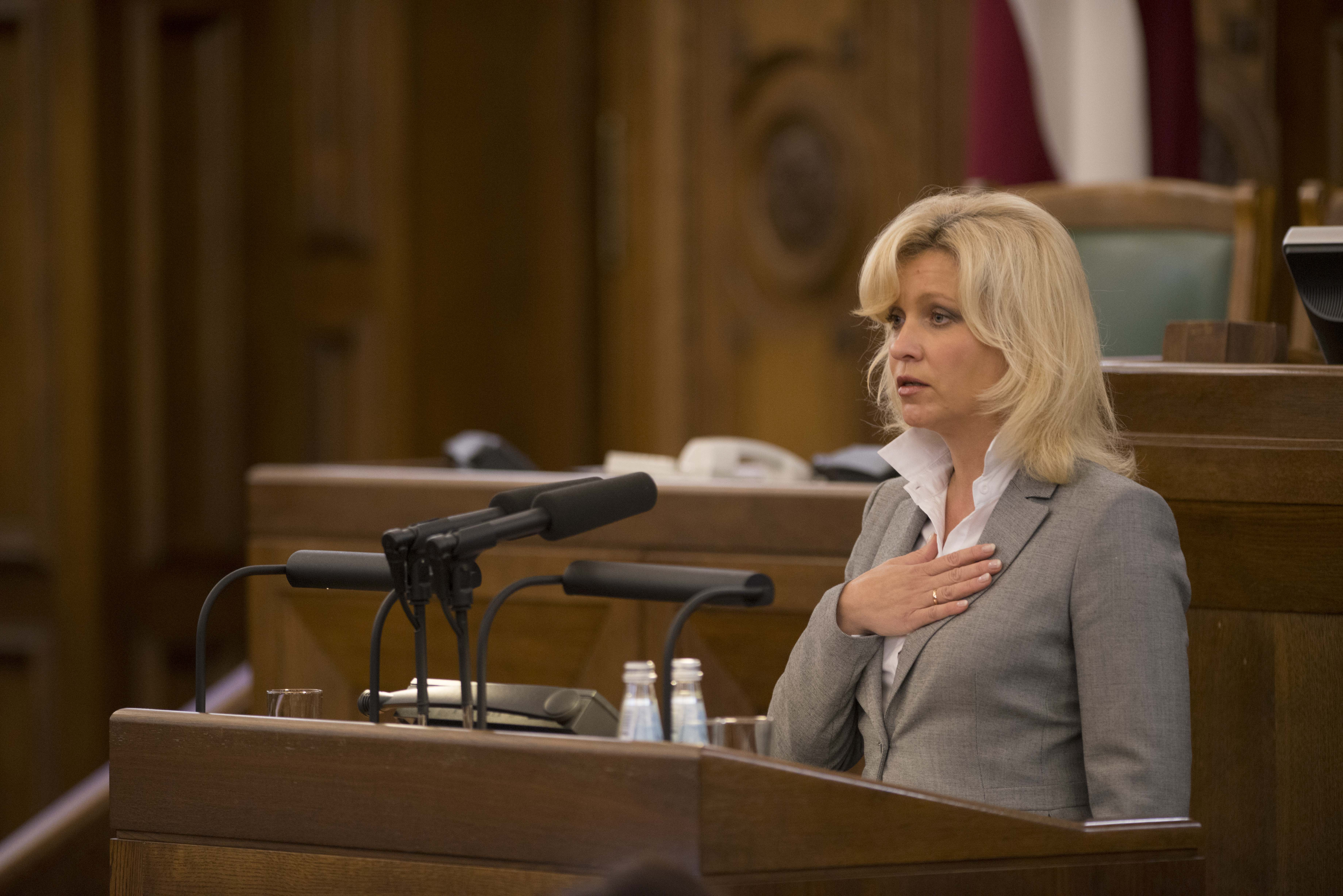

Personal details
- Born: 19 November 1966 (age 59) Sevastopol, Ukrainian SSR
- Party: Harmony
- Spouse: Pāvels Luņovs (m. 2006; div. 2020)
- Children: 3
- Education: University of Latvia (1994)
- Profession: journalist

Regīna Ločmele (born 1966) is a Latvian politician and former journalist. She is a member of Harmony and a deputy of the 12th Saeima.
