= Aleksandrs Kiršteins =

Latvian politician and architect

Personal details
- Born: 27 August 1948 (age 78) Riga, Latvia
- Party: Latvian National Independence Movement (1988–1997); Latvian National Reform Party (1997—1998); People's Party (1998–2005); Latvian Farmers' Union (200?–201?); All for Latvia! (2011); National Alliance (2011–2024)
- Education: Riga Polytechnic Institute (1972)

Aleksandrs Kiršteins (born 27 August 1948) is a Latvian architect and far-right politician. Former Chairman of the Foreign Affairs Committee. Member of the Supreme Council of Latvia and seven convocations of the Saeima.

== Controversy ==
In 2005, Kiršteins was criticised by members of the Latvian Jewish community for his tacit support of a controversial exhibition "Herberts Cukurs: The Presumption of Innocence". For his response, in which Kiršteins hinted at the Latvian Jewish community's collaboration with the "state's enemies" during the Soviet occupation of Latvia in 1940, he was expelled from People's Party.

In 2022, State Police launched an investigation into Kiršteins for referring to the Latvian Television journalist Anete Bērtule as a "political prostitute".

== Award ==
In 1997, he was awarded the French National Order of Merit.
