= Kārlis Strēlis =

Latvian politician and basketball player

Kārlis Strēlis (16 March 1943 in Madona – 15 December 2023) was a Latvian basketball player, then a sports doctor, lecturer (professor at the Latvian Academy of Sport Education) and politician. He was a member of the 8th Saeima (2002–2006) and a member of the Riga City Council for two terms.
