= Nikita Nikiforov =

Latvian Russian politician (born 1983)

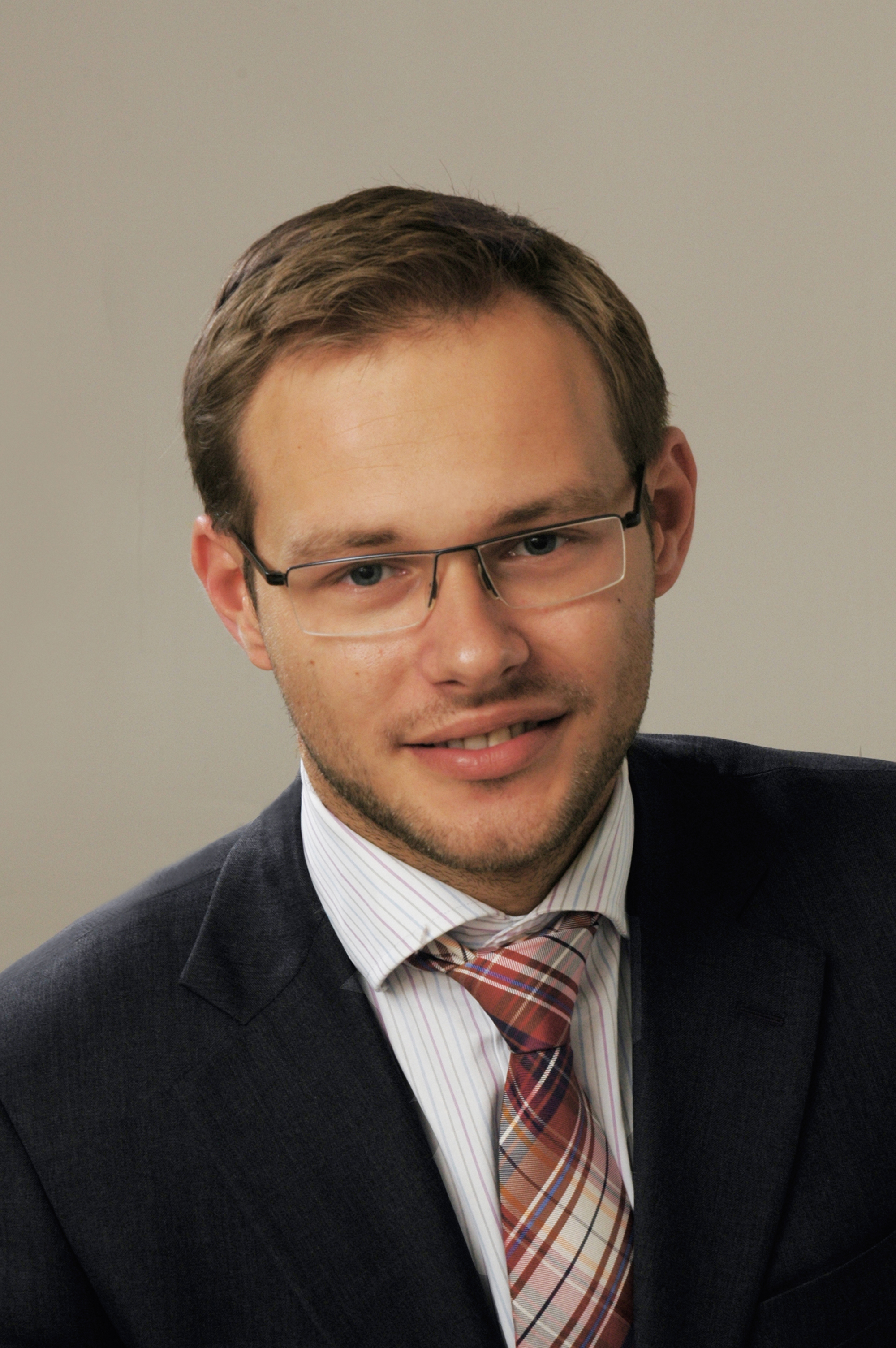

Deputy of the Saeima

Personal details
- Born: 8 September 1983 (age 43) Latvian SSR
- Party: Harmony
- Education: Baltic International Academy

Nikita Nikiforov (Russian: Никита Никифоров, Latvian: Ņikita Ņikiforovs; born 1983) is a Latvian Russian politician. He is a member of Harmony and a deputy of the 12th Saeima.
