= Oļegs Deņisovs =

Latvian Russian politician

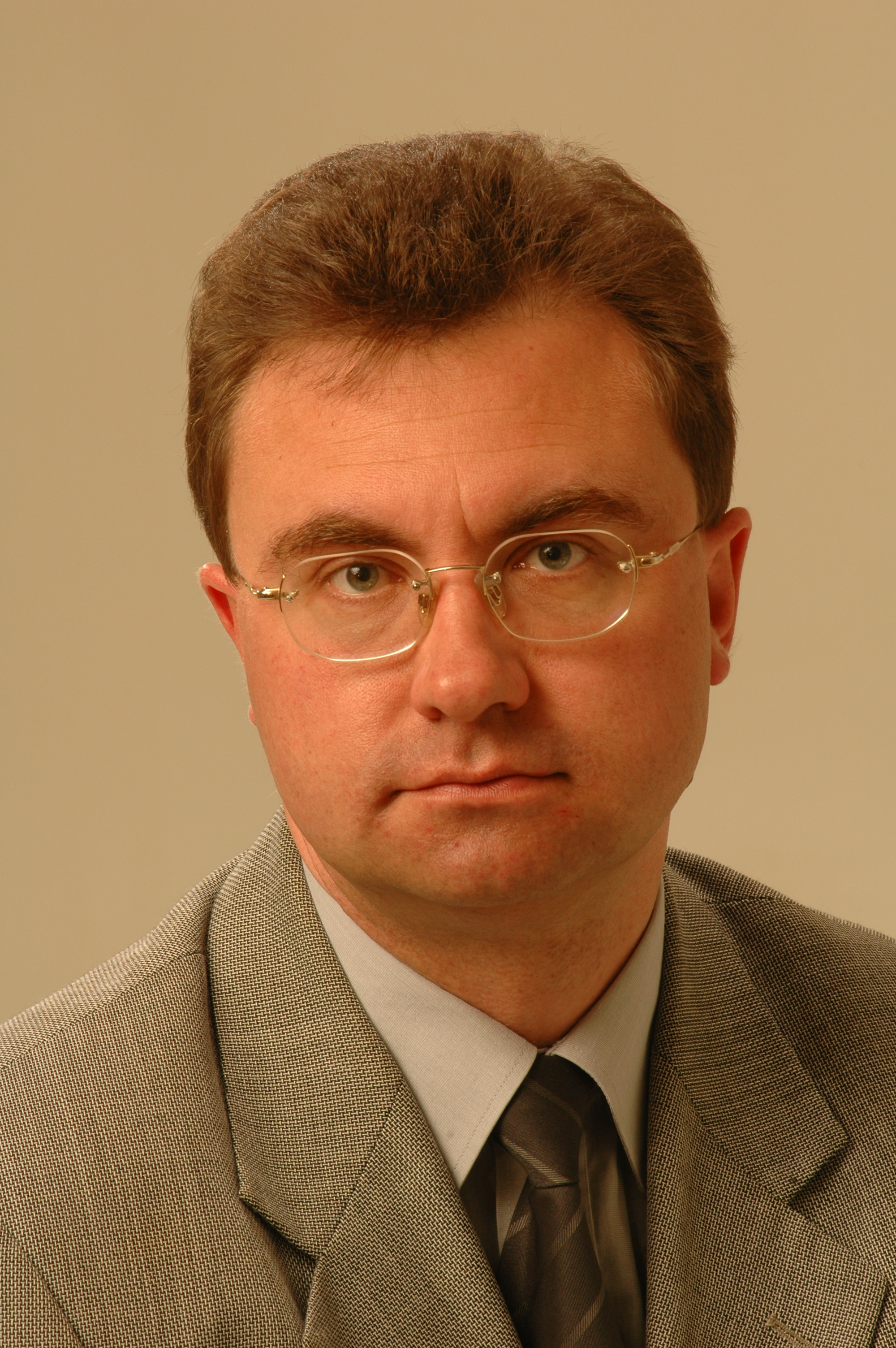
Oļegs Deņisovs

Oļegs Deņisovs (born 1966) is a Latvian Russian politician. He is a member of the Socialist Party of Latvia and was a deputy of the 7th, 8th and 9th Saeima (Latvian Parliament).
