= Vineta Muižniece =

Latvian jurist and politician

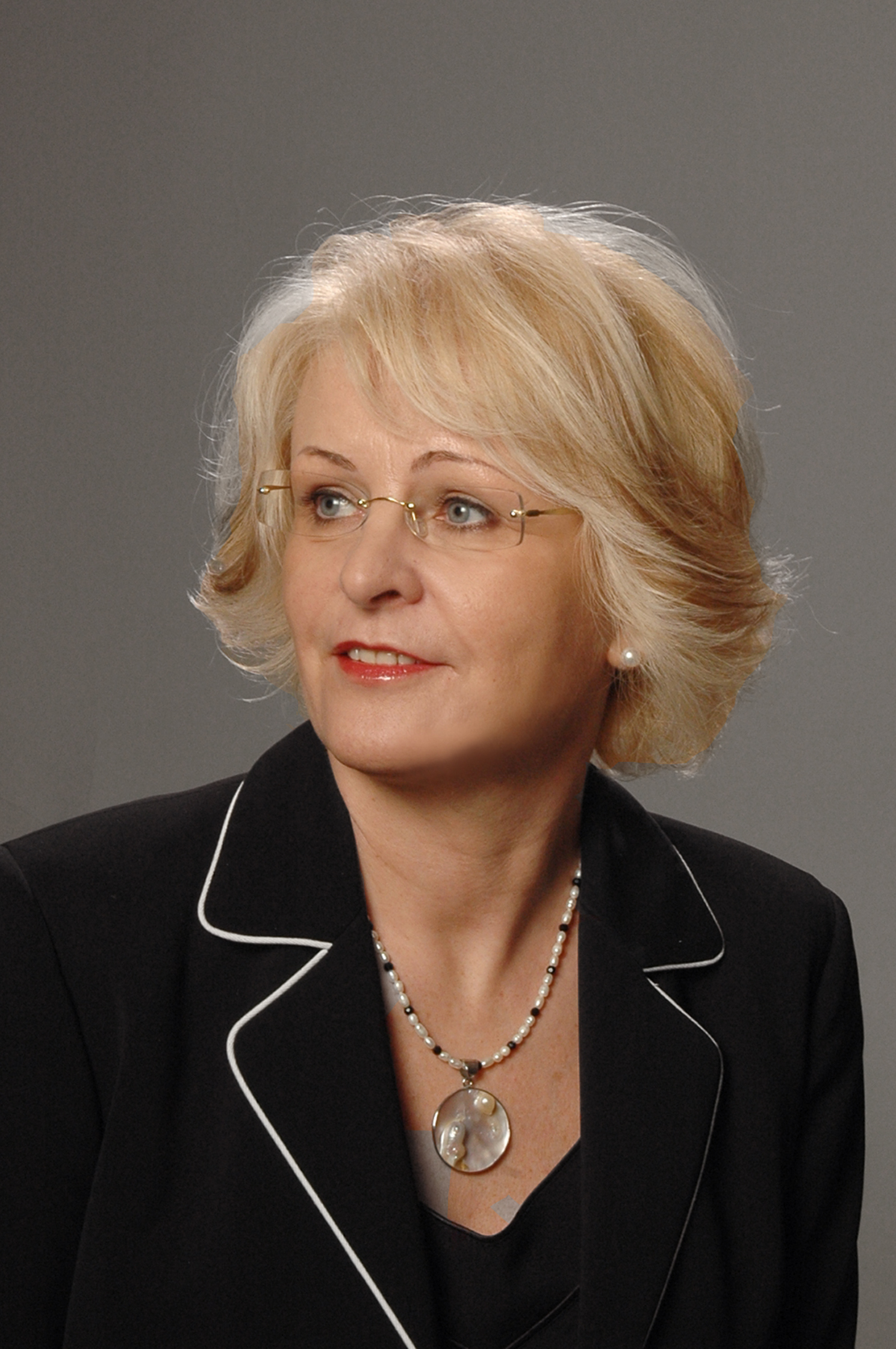

Vineta Muižniece (born 3 November 1956) is a Latvian jurist and politician. In 2004, she was justice minister. She was a Deputy Speaker of the Saeima from 2005 until 2009, being a member of the People's Party. Since 2010, she is a justice of the Constitutional Court. In 2011, she was suspended due to criminal proceedings against her for alleged forging of documents while working in the parliament.
