= List of presidents of Latvia by age =

This is a list of presidents of Latvia by age. The first table charts the age of each president of Latvia at the beginning of the presidency, upon leaving office, and at the time of death. Where the president is still living, their lifespan is calculated up to September 16, 2026.

The five oldest presidents, arranged by lifespan:

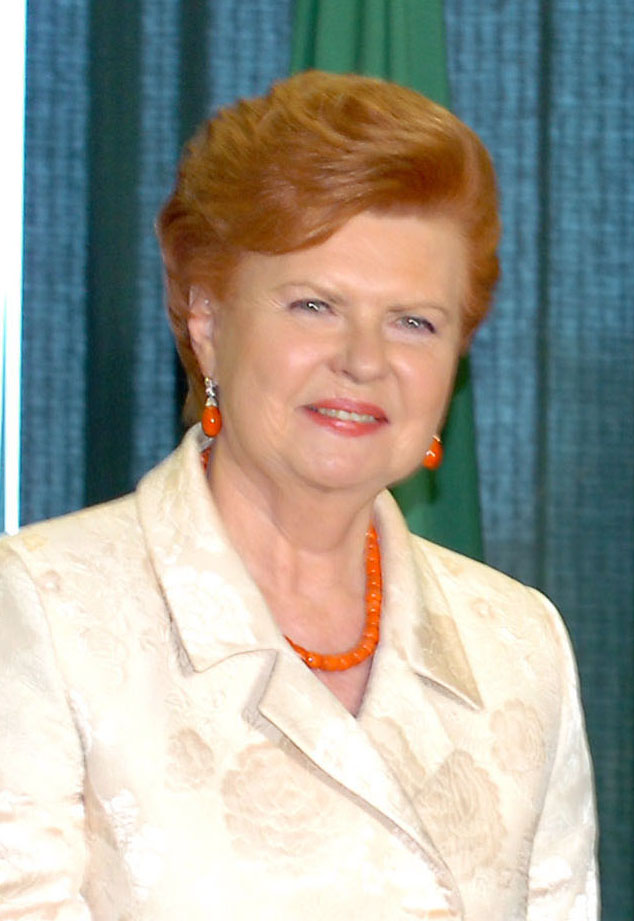
Vaira Vīķe-Freiberga
Born December 1, 1937
(age 88 years, 289 days)

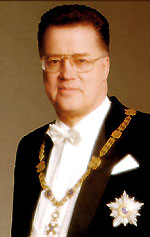
Guntis Ulmanis
September 13, 1939
(age 87 years, 3 days)

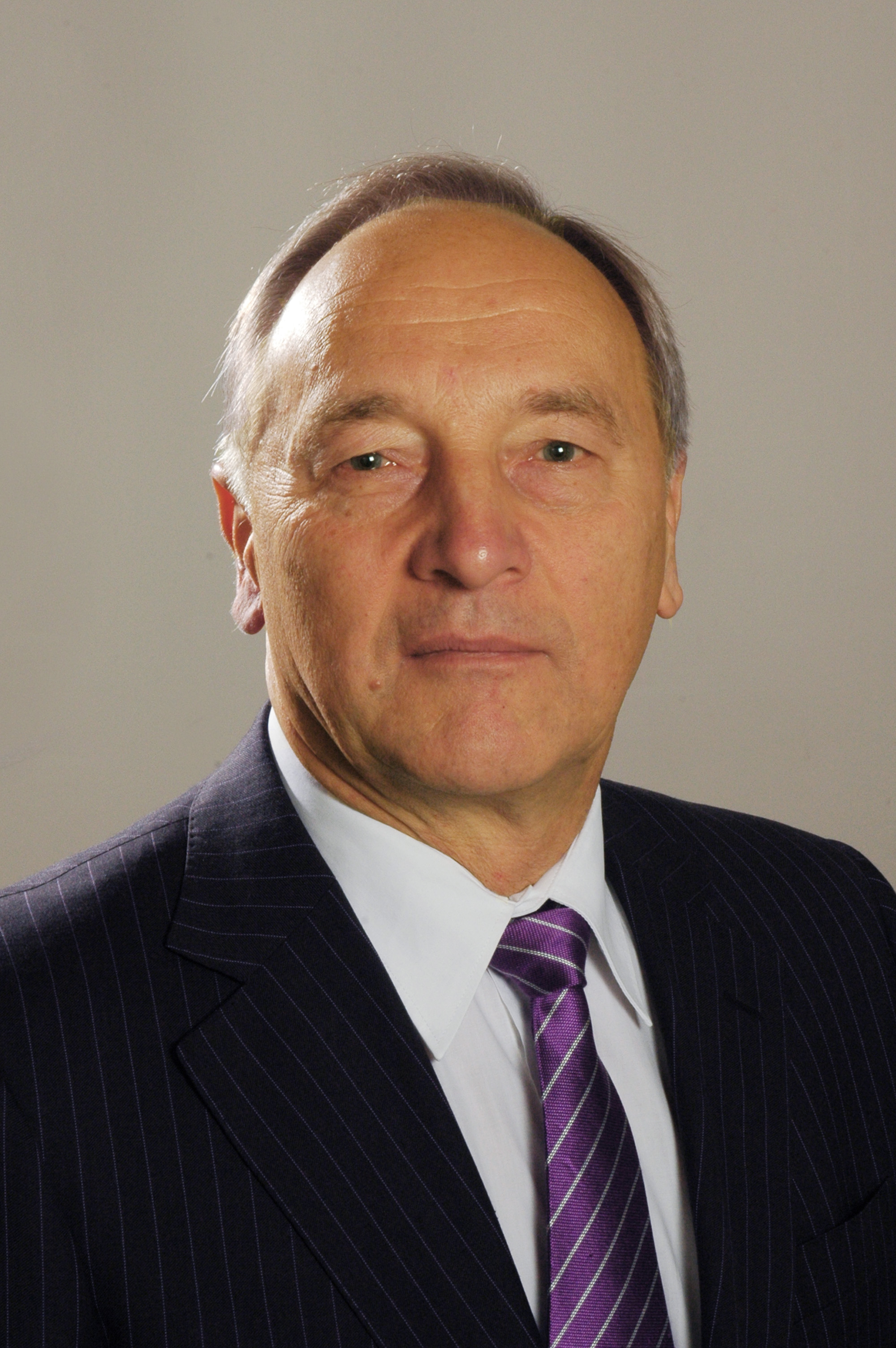
Andris Bērziņš
December 10, 1944
(age 81 years, 280 days)

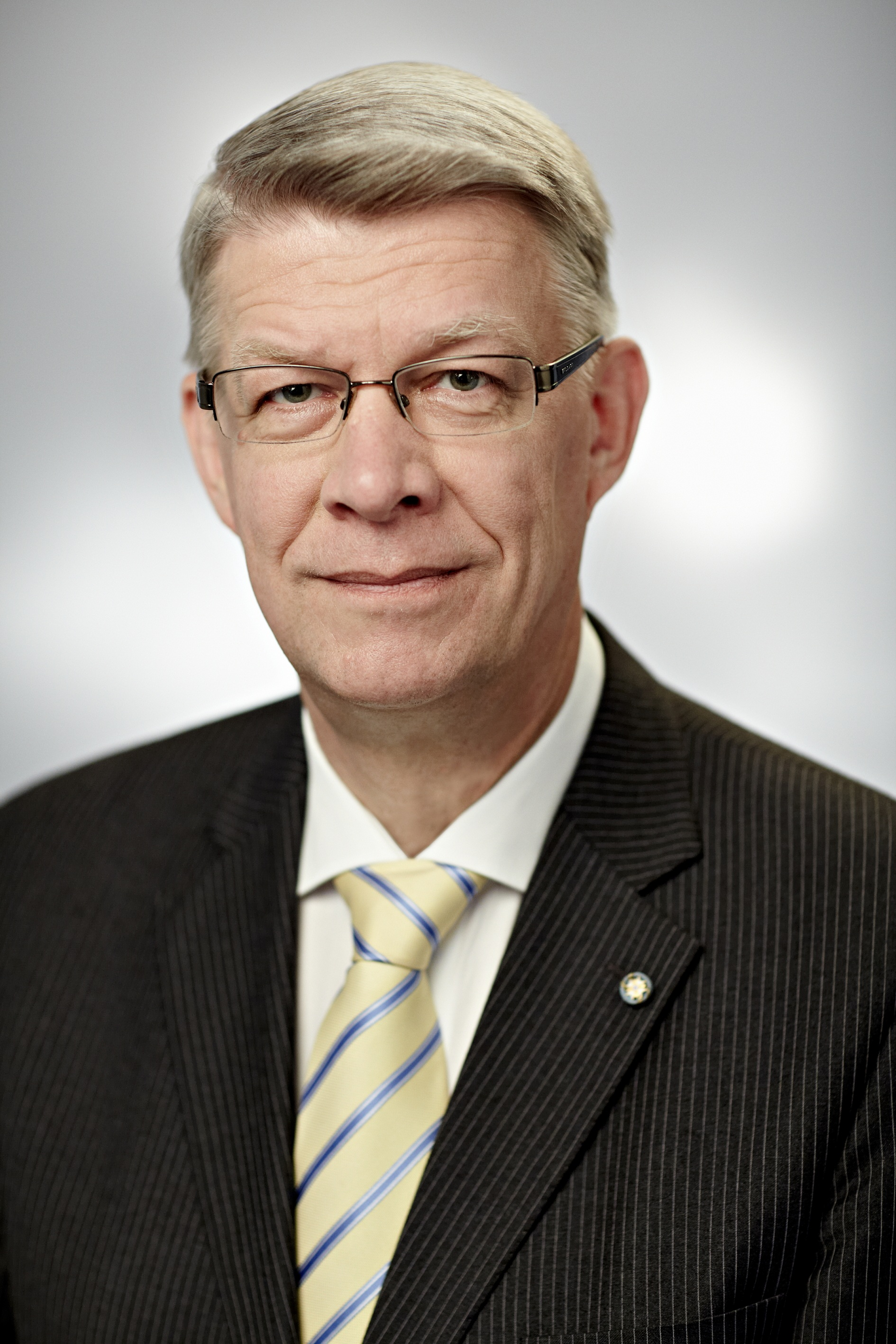
Valdis Zatlers
March 22, 1955
(age 71 years, 178 days)

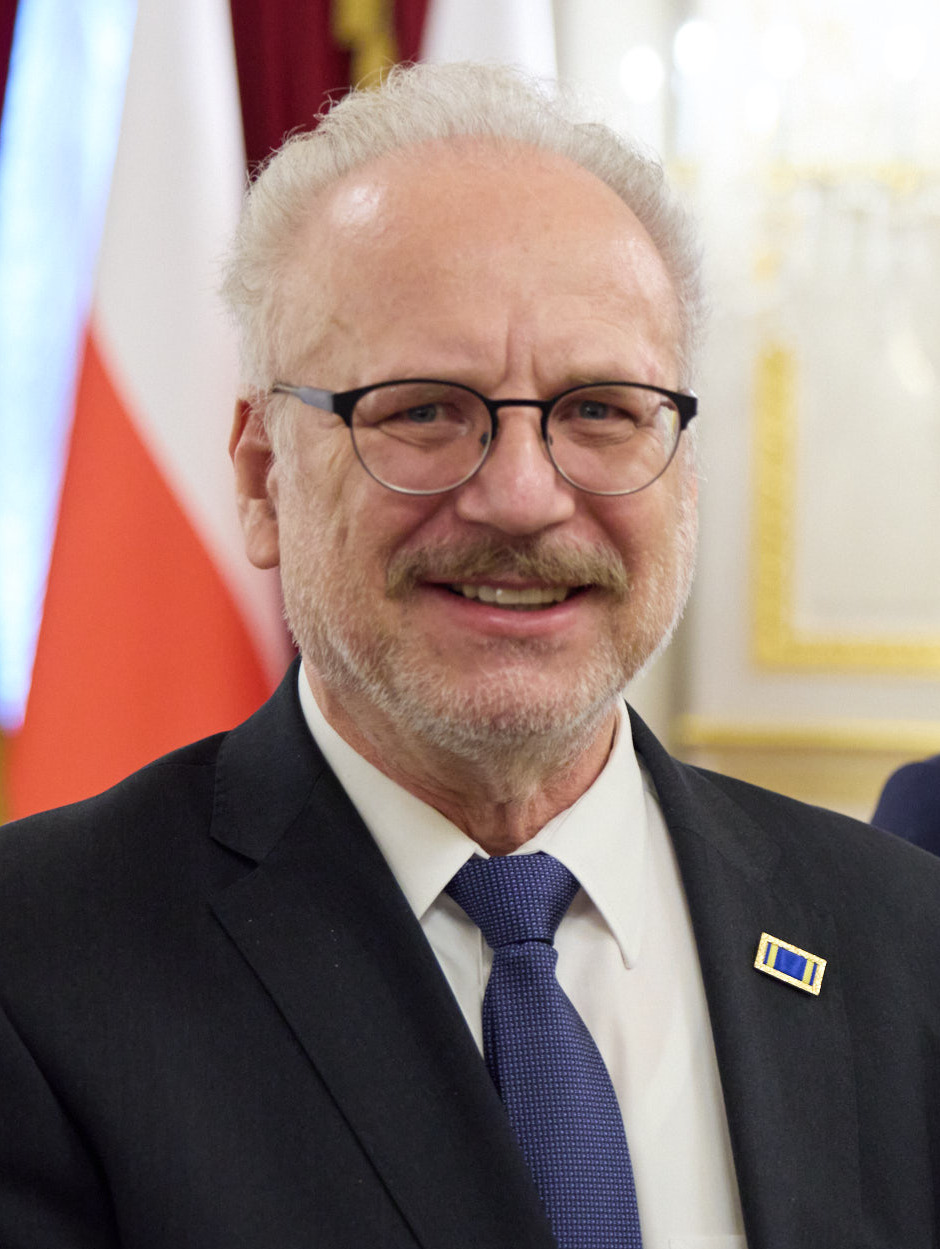
Egils Levits
June 30, 1955
(age 71 years, 78 days)

== Presidential age-related data ==
#	President	Born	Age at start of presidency	Age at end of presidency	Post-presidency timespan	Lifespan	
#	President	Born	Age at start of presidency	Age at end of presidency	Post-presidency timespan	Died	Age
1	Jānis Čakste	Sep 14, 1859 (Note: Birthdate as changed to New Style.)	63 years, 61 days Nov 14, 1922	67 years, 181 days Mar 14, 1927 (Note: Died in office.)	0 days	Mar 14, 1927	67 years, 181 days
2	Gustavs Zemgals	Aug 12, 1871	55 years, 239 days Apr 8, 1927	58 years, 240 days Apr 9, 1930	8 years, 272 days	Jan 6, 1939	67 years, 147 days
3	Alberts Kviesis	Dec 22, 1881	48 years, 108 days Apr 9, 1930	54 years, 111 days Apr 11, 1936	8 years, 120 days	Aug 9, 1944	62 years, 231 days
4	Kārlis Ulmanis	Sep 4, 1877	58 years, 220 days Apr 11, 1936	62 years, 321 days Jul 21, 1940	2 years, 61 days	Sep 20, 1942	65 years, 16 days
5	Guntis Ulmanis	Sep 13, 1939	53 years, 297 days Jul 7, 1993	59 years, 297 days Jul 7, 1999	27 years, 71 days	(living)	87 years, 3 days
6	Vaira Vīķe-Freiberga	Dec 1, 1937	61 years, 219 days Jul 8, 1999	69 years, 218 days Jul 7, 2007	19 years, 71 days	(living)	88 years, 289 days
7	Valdis Zatlers	Mar 22, 1955	52 years, 108 days Jul 8, 2007	56 years, 107 days Jul 7, 2011	15 years, 71 days	(living)	71 years, 178 days
8	Andris Bērziņš	Dec 10, 1944	66 years, 210 days Jul 8, 2011	70 years, 209 days Jul 7, 2015	11 years, 71 days	(living)	81 years, 280 days
9	Raimonds Vējonis	Jun 15, 1966	49 years, 23 days Jul 8, 2015	53 years, 22 days Jul 7, 2019	7 years, 71 days	(living)	60 years, 93 days
10	Egils Levits	Jun 30, 1955	64 years, 8 days Jul 8, 2019	68 years, 7 days Jul 7, 2023	3 years, 71 days	(living)	71 years, 78 days
11	Edgars Rinkēvičs	Sep 21, 1973	49 years, 290 days Jul 8, 2023	(incumbent)	(incumbent)	(living)	52 years, 360 days
#	President	Born	Age at start of presidency	Age at end of presidency	Post-presidency timespan	Died	Age
#	President	Born	Age at start of presidency	Age at end of presidency	Post-presidency timespan	Lifespan	

== Sources ==
- Former Presidents of Latvia. Website of the President of Latvia.
- President of Latvia Egils Levits. Website of the President of Latvia.
