= President of Latvia =

Head of state

President of the Republic of Latvia
- Latvijas Valsts prezidents
- Presidential Standard

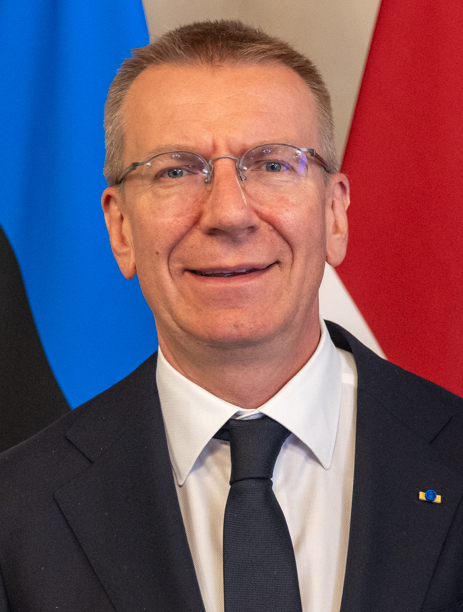
- Incumbent; Edgars Rinkēvičs since 8 July 2023
- Chancery of the President of Latvia
- Style: Mr. President (informal); His Excellency (diplomatic)
- Status: Head of state
- Member of: Latvian National Armed Forces
- Residence: Riga Castle
- Seat: Riga, Latvia
- Appointer: Saeima
- Term length: Four years, renewable once consecutively
- Constituting instrument: Constitution of Latvia (1922)
- Inaugural holder: Jānis Čakste
- Formation: 14 November 1922; 104 years ago
- Abolished: 1940–1991
- Deputy: Speaker of the Saeima
- Salary: €54,732 annually
- Website: www.president.lv

The president of Latvia (Latvian: Latvijas Valsts prezidents lit. 'State President of Latvia') is head of state and commander-in-chief of the National Armed Forces of the Republic of Latvia.

The term of this office is four years. Before 1999, it was three years. The president may be elected any number of times, but not more than twice in a row. In the event of the vacancy in the office of the president, the speaker of the Saeima assumes the duties of the president. For example, after the death of Jānis Čakste, Pauls Kalniņš, the speaker of the Saeima, was acting president briefly in 1927 until a new president could be elected.

The president is not a fully executive post, as is the case with the president of Lithuania. However, unlike the president of Estonia, his role is not entirely ceremonial. Under the constitution of Latvia, the president shares executive power with the cabinet and prime minister. However, the president is not politically responsible for carrying out his duties. His orders are not valid without the countersignature of a member of the cabinet – usually the prime minister.

The current president is Edgars Rinkēvičs, former Latvian foreign minister, who was elected by the Saeima on 31 May 2023 after three rounds of voting, and began his four-year term on 8 July 2023. This made Rinkēvičs the first openly gay head of state of any EU member state.

== History and development ==
The establishment of the institution of the president of Latvia was envisioned by the Satversme (Constitution) of the Republic of Latvia adopted by the Constitutional Assembly on 15 February 1922. Before the Satversme took effect, there was no separate office of President of Latvia. The Chairperson of the Parliament undertook the duties of the head of state.

According to the first provisional constitution, the Political Platform of the People's Council of Latvia adopted on 17 November 1918 (Latvian: Latvijas Tautas padomes politiskā platforma), its Chairman Jānis Čakste assumed the functions of the head of state from the day the Republic of Latvia was proclaimed until the day of the convention of the Constitutional Assembly. The second provisional constitution, the Provisional Regulations on the Political System of the Republic of Latvia of 1 June 1920 (Latvijas valsts iekārtas pagaidu noteikumi), set forth that Čakste, as the president of the Constitutional Assembly, fulfilled the functions of the head of state until the Satversme took legal effect and the Saeima (Parliament) convened. This was also confirmed by the Law on the Satversme of the Republic of Latvia of 20 June 1922 (Likums par Latvijas Republikas Satversmi).

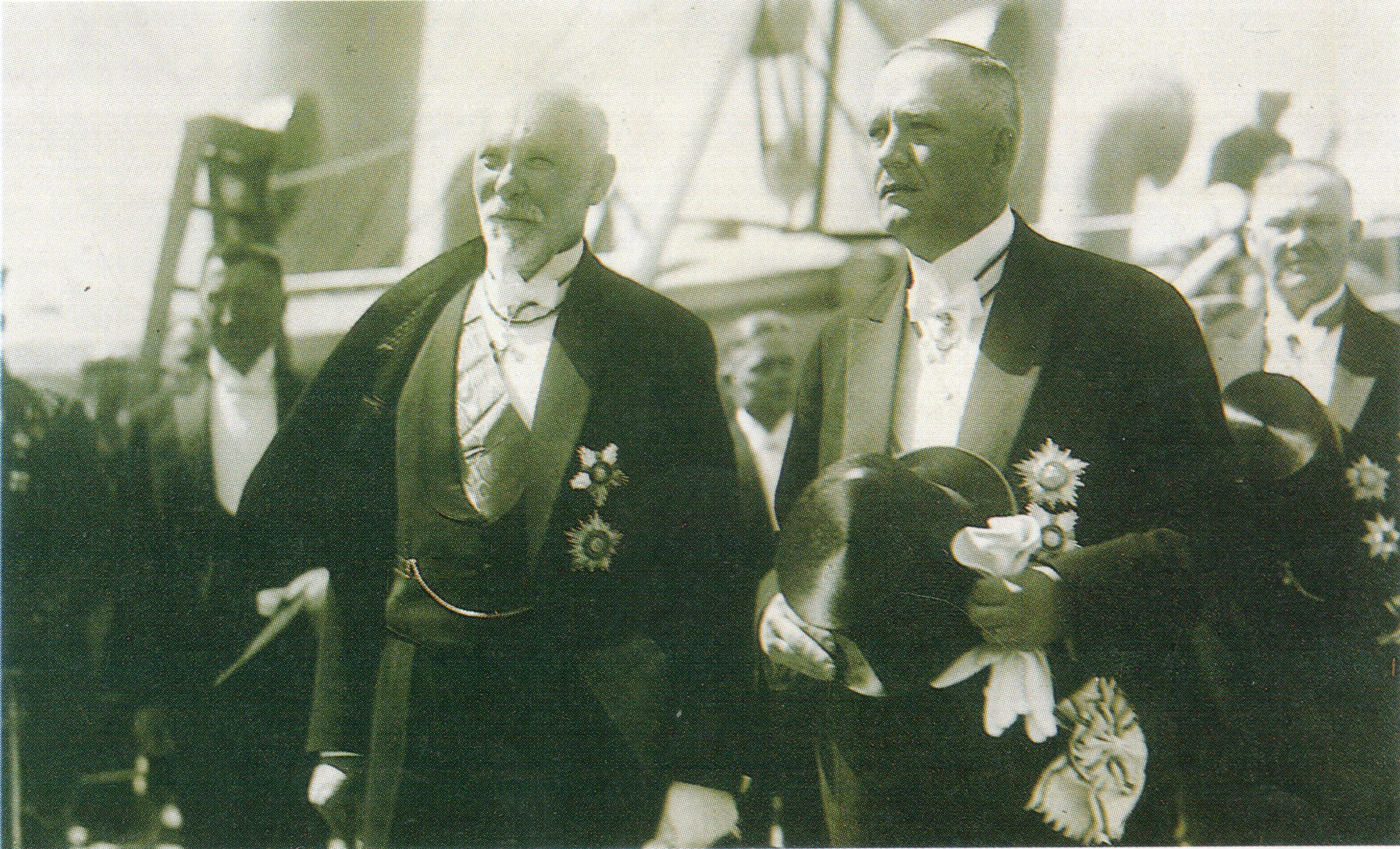
Latvian president Čakste (left) meeting president of Finland Lauri Kristian Relander in 1922

On 14 November 1922, the 1st convocation of the Saeima elected Čakste as president of the Republic of Latvia, delivering his oath of office during Independence Day on 18 November. Čakste was re-elected as president by the 2nd Saeima on 6 November 1925, with him repeating his oath on November 8.

After Čakste died on 14 March 1927, the 2nd Saeima elected Gustavs Zemgals as president on 8 April 1927, delivering the oath of office the same day. Zemgals refused to run for a second term, and the 3rd Saeima elected Alberts Kviesis as president on 9 April 1930, who was sworn in on April 11. Kviesis was re-elected as president of Latvia by the 4th Saeima on 4 April 1933, and repeated his oath on April 11.

Kviesis remained as president after the anti-constitutional coup d’état of 15 May 1934, and while condemning the coup, did not interfere with the replacement of a democratic parliamentary republic with an authoritarian political system. When the second term of Kviesis as president was approaching its end, the Cabinet of Ministers passed the Law on the Execution of the President's Office of 12 March 1936 (Likums par Valsts prezidenta amata izpildīšanu). It decreed that after the Kviesis' second term expired on 11 April 1936, Prime Minister Kārlis Ulmanis would undertake the position until the 'completion of the constitutional reform'. Under this law, the posts of the president of Latvia and prime minister were merged on 11 April 1936, with Kārlis Ulmanis de facto remaining in these offices until the Soviet occupation of the Republic of Latvia on 17 June 1940.

The Soviet Union's aggression, as well as the occupation and unlawful incorporation of the Baltic states into the USSR in 1940, did not lead to changes in official Latvian law, as the USSR had violated the norms of international law and the fundamental laws of the Republic of Latvia. Thus, the Republic of Latvia continued to exist as a recognized subject of international law throughout the years of occupation. During that period, the Foreign Service of the Republic of Latvia continued to represent the Republic of Latvia in exile, which continued to operate until the restoration of the independence of Latvia.

During the occupation, there were attempts to restore the independence of Latvia and establish a government. At the meeting of the Latvian Central Council on 8 September 1944, it adopted a Declaration on the Restoration of the State of Latvia (Deklarācija par Latvijas valsts atjaunošanu), by which the Speaker of the last legally elected Saeima, Pauls Kalniņš, became acting president of Latvia. After the death of Kalniņš on 26 August 1945, the Latvian Central Council announced on 26 April 1947 that according to the Satversme, the powers of the Speaker and the acting president of Latvia were taken over by Vice-Speaker of the Saeima, Bishop Jāzeps Rancāns until his death on 2 December 1969.

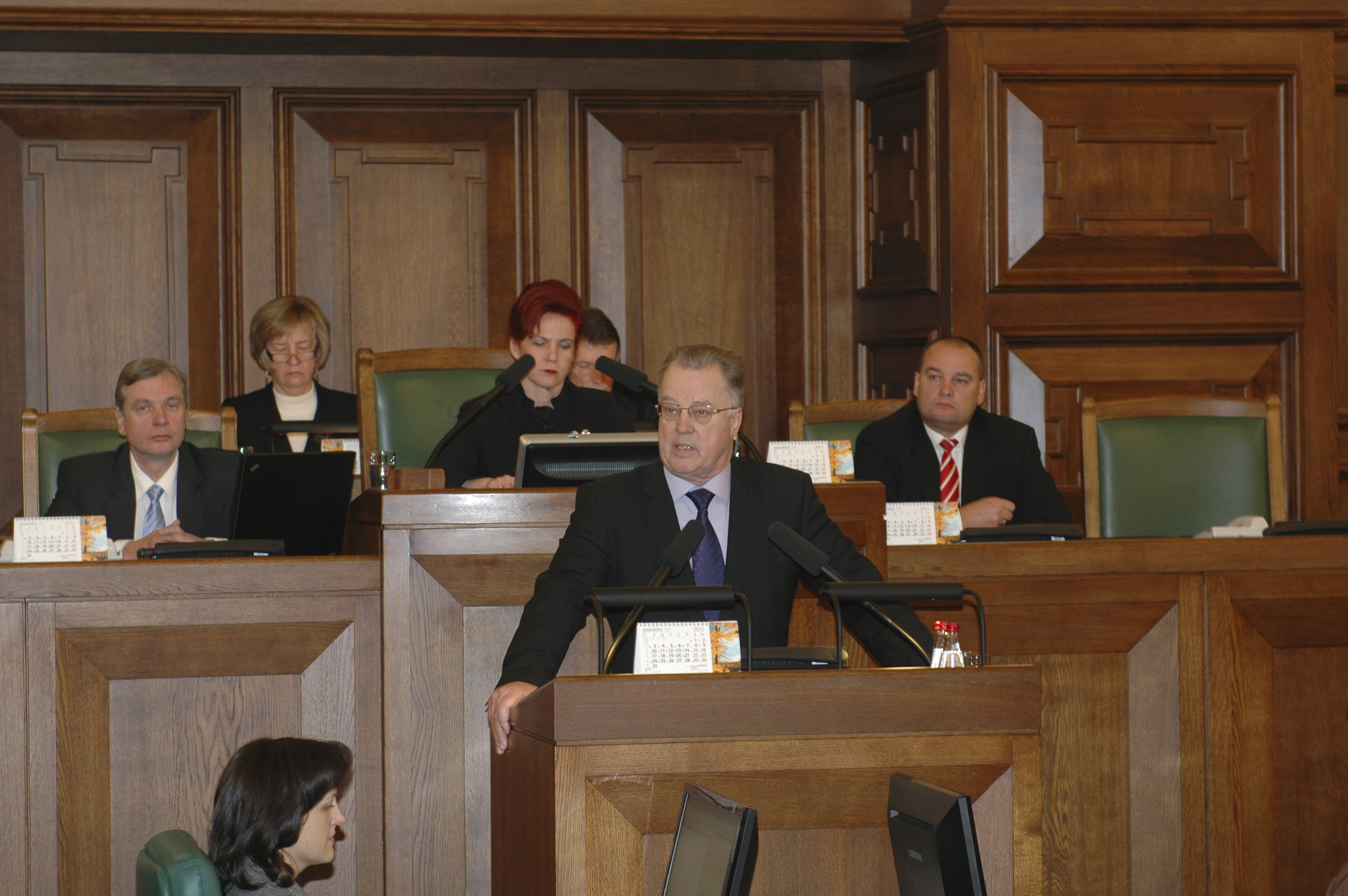
Guntis Ulmanis speaking from the Saeima podium during the parliamentary foreign policy debates in 2014

After the restoration of the independence of the Republic of Latvia in 1990, a separate post of President of Latvia was not created immediately. During the transition period, the Chairperson of the Supreme Council of Latvia, Anatolijs Gorbunovs, undertook the duties of the head of state until the full restoration of the Satversme and the convening of the 5th convocation of the Saeima. The Law on the Organization of the Work of the Supreme Council of the Republic of Latvia Until the Convening of the Saeima (Par Latvijas Republikas Augstākās padomes darba organizāciju līdz Saeimas sanākšanai) of 25 August 1992 and the Law on the Head of State of the Republic of Latvia Before the Gathering of the Saeima (Par Latvijas Republikas valsts galvu līdz Saeimas sanākšanai) of 15 September 1992 served as the legal foundation of the interim office.

With the restoration of the Satversme in full and the first session of the Saeima at noon on 6 July 1993, the office of president was also reinstated. On 7 July 1993, the 5th Saeima elected Guntis Ulmanis as president of Latvia, who delivered the oath of office the next day, and the 6th Saeima re-elected Ulmanis on 18 June 1996, who was sworn in on July 8, which became the traditional date on which the oath of office is delivered.

The 7th Saeima elected Vaira Vīķe-Freiberga as the first female President on 17 June 1999, and was resoundingly re-elected by the 8th Saeima on 20 June 2003. The 9th Saeima chose Valdis Zatlers as president on 31 May 2007. Zatlers became the first sitting President to be defeated in his re-election bid, with the 10th Saeima picking Andris Bērziņš on 2 June 2011. He was succeeded by Raimonds Vējonis, elected by the Saeima on 3 June 2015. Both Bērziņš and Vējonis did not decide to run for re-election.

== Duties and rights ==
=== The powers of the president conferred to them by the Constitution ===
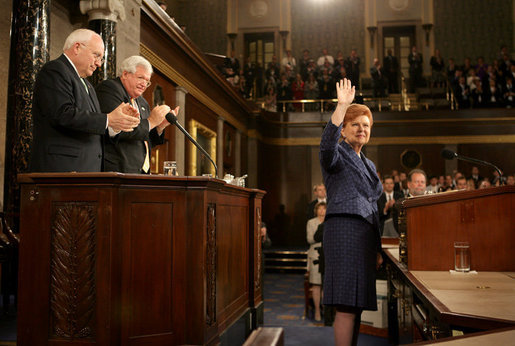
President Vaira Vīķe-Freiberga on 7 June 2006 after an address to a joint meeting of Congress held in her honor at the U.S. Capitol in Washington

The president represents Latvia in international relations, appoints the diplomatic representatives of Latvia, and also receives diplomatic representatives of other countries. The president implements the decisions of the Saeima concerning the ratification of international agreements (Article 41 of the Constitution of the Republic of Latvia).

The president is the Commander-in-Chief of the Armed Forces of Latvia. During wartime, the president appoints a Supreme Commander (Article 42 of the Constitution of the Republic of Latvia).

The president shall declare war by a decision of the Saeima. (Article 43 of the Constitution of the Republic of Latvia).

The president has the right to take whatever steps are necessary for the military defence of the State should another state declare war on Latvia or an enemy invade its borders. Concurrently and immediately, the president shall convene the Saeima, which shall decide as to the declaration and commencement of the war. (Article 44 of the Constitution of the Republic of Latvia).

The president has the right to grant clemency to criminals against whom the judgment of the court has come into legal effect. The extent of, and procedures for, the utilisation of this right shall be set out in a specific law (Article 45 of the Constitution of the Republic of Latvia).

The president has the right to convene and preside over extraordinary meetings of the Cabinet of Ministers and to determine the agenda of such meetings. (Article 46 of the Constitution of the Republic of Latvia).

The president as well as the prime minister, or not less than one-third of the members of the Saeima may request that the Presidium convene sittings of the Saeima (Article 20 of the Constitution of the Republic of Latvia).

At the request of the president, ten members of the Saeima, the prime minister, or a minister, the Saeima may decide by a majority vote of not less than two-thirds of the members present to sit in closed session (Article 22 of the Constitution of the Republic of Latvia).

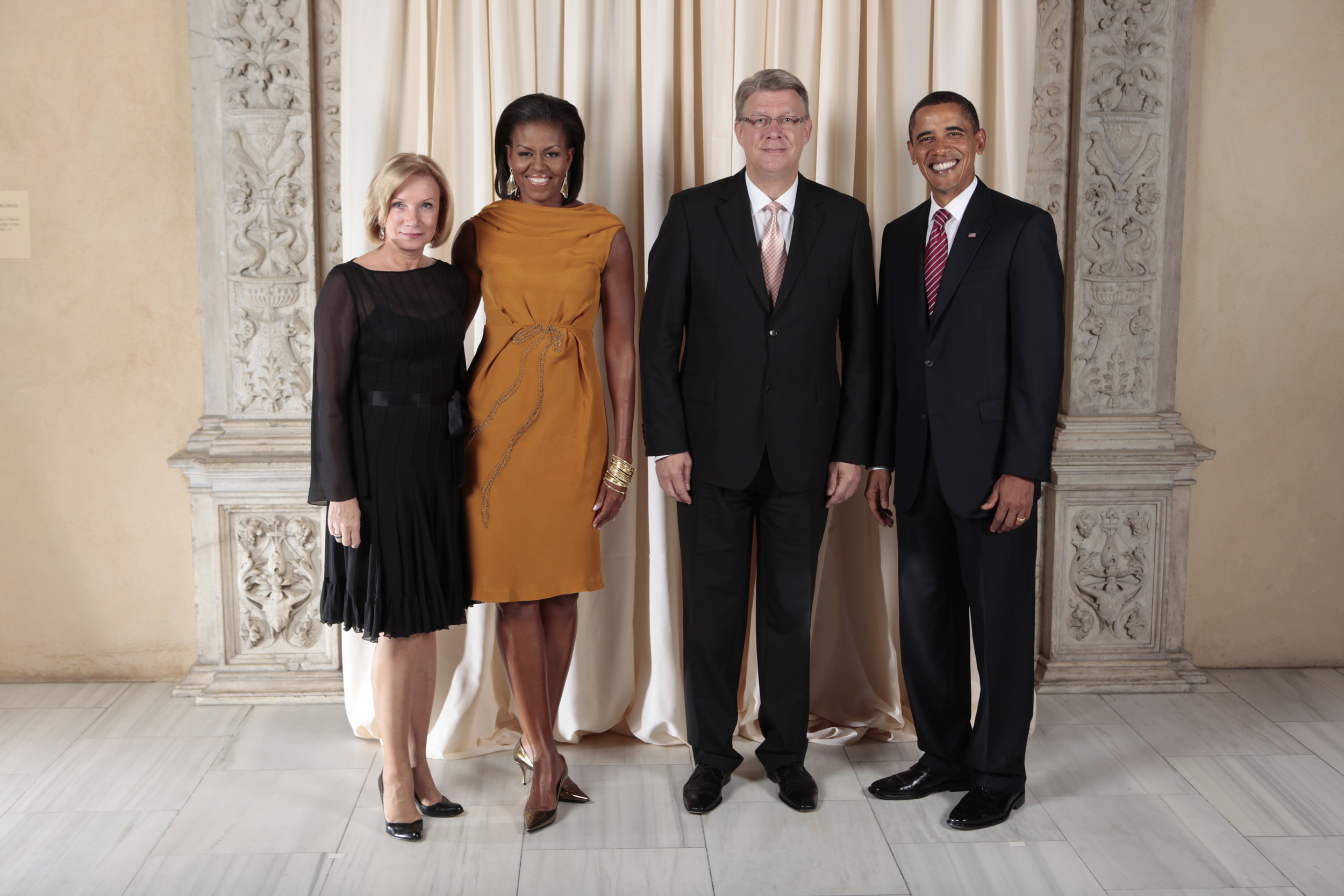
President Valdis Zatlers and First Lady Lilita Zatlere with President Barack Obama and U.S. first lady Michelle Obama

The president is entitled to propose the dissolution of the Saeima. Following this proposal, a national referendum is to be held. If in the referendum more than half of the votes are cast in favour of dissolution, the Saeima is to be considered dissolved, new elections called, and such elections held no later than two months after the date of the dissolution of the Saeima (Article 48 of the Constitution of the Republic of Latvia).

If the Saeima has been dissolved, the mandate of the members of the Saeima continues to be in effect until the newly elected Saeima has convened, but the dissolved Saeima may only hold sittings at the request of the president. The president shall determine the agenda of such sittings (Article 49 of the Constitution of the Republic of Latvia).

The president does not bear political responsibility for the fulfilment of presidential duties. All orders of the president are jointly signed by the prime minister or by the appropriate minister, who thus assumes full responsibility for such orders except the order on the dissolution of the Saeima (Article 48 of the Constitution of the Republic of Latvia) and invitation of the candidate for the office of the prime minister (Article 56 of the Constitution of the Republic of Latvia).

Membership of the Cabinet of Ministers is determined by the person who is asked to do so by the president (Article 56 of the Constitution of the Republic of Latvia).

=== Powers of the president in the area of legislation ===
The president has the right to initiate legislation. (Article 47 of the Constitution of the Republic of Latvia).

The president proclaims laws passed by the Saeima not earlier than the tenth day and not later than the twenty-first day after the law has been adopted. The law comes into force fourteen days after its proclamation unless a different term has been specified in the law (Article 69 of the Constitution of the Republic of Latvia).

Within ten days of the adoption of the law by the Saeima, the president may require that a law is reconsidered using a written and reasoned request to the Chairperson of the Saeima. If the Saeima does not amend the law, then the president may not raise objections for a second time (Article 71 of the Constitution of the Republic of Latvia).

The president has the right to suspend the proclamation of law for two months.

The president shall suspend the proclamation of law if so requested by not less than one-third of the Members of the Saeima. This right may be exercised by the president, or by one-third of the Members of the Saeima, within ten days of the adoption of the law by the Saeima. The law thus suspended shall be put to a national referendum if so requested by not less than one-tenth of the electorate. If no such request is received during the aforementioned two-month period, the law shall then be proclaimed after the expiration of such period. A national referendum shall not take place, however, if the Saeima votes on the law again and not less than three-quarters of all Members of the Saeima vote for the adoption of the law (Article 72 of the Constitution of the Republic of Latvia).

Should the Saeima, by not less than a two-thirds majority vote, determine a law to be urgent, the president may not request reconsideration of such law, it may not be submitted to national referendum and the adopted law shall be proclaimed no later than the third day after the president has received it (Article 75 of the Constitution of the Republic of Latvia).

Electors, in number comprising not less than one-tenth of the electorate, have the right to submit a fully elaborated draft of an amendment to the Constitution or of law to the president, who shall present it to the Saeima (Article 78 of the Constitution of the Republic of Latvia).

=== The powers of the president provided for in other legislation of the Republic of Latvia ===
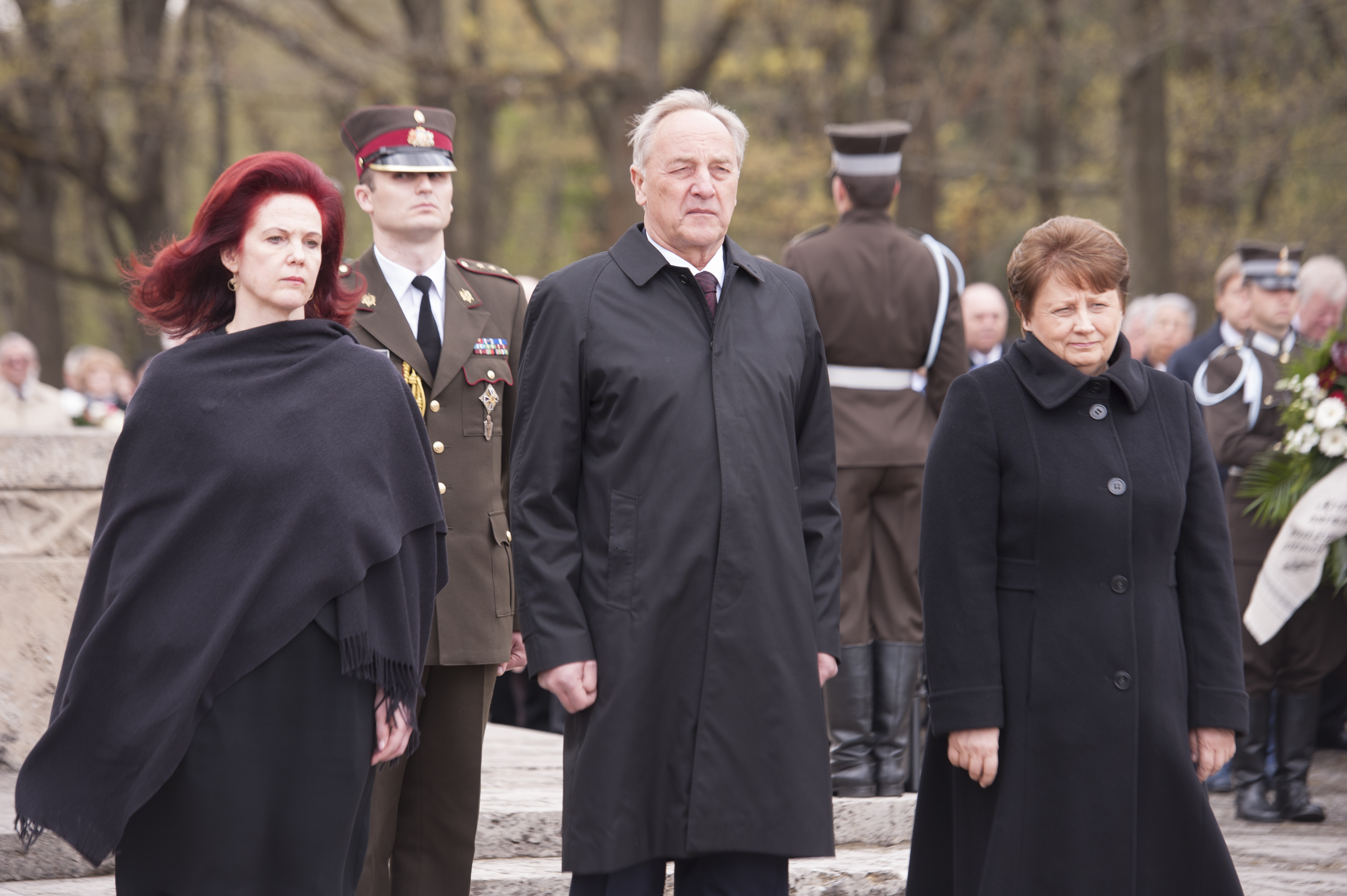
President Andris Bērziņš with Speaker of the Saeima and Prime Minister of Latvia

Article 45 of the Constitution of Latvia provides for the exclusive right of the president to grant clemency to criminals. The extent of, and procedures for, the utilisation of this right are set out in a specific law subjected to the Constitution, the Law on Clemency.

Based on the general principles of the Constitution the duties and rights of the president are also envisaged in other laws not particularly specified in the Constitution of the Republic of Latvia. They are as follows:

1. The Law on the Power of Courts – the president must attend to the oath of judges (Section 68, paragraph 2).

2. The Law on State Security – the president, chairs the National Security Council.

3. The Law on the State Secret provides for the President's rights to receive the information containing the state secret, as well as which information is to be considered state secret relating to the highest authorities of the state.

4. The Law on the National Armed Forces – after the President's proposal the Saeima approves of as well as dismisses the Commander of the National Armed Forces (Section 14).

5. The Law on the Diplomatic and Consular Service – the president appoints and dismisses the extraordinary and plenipotentiary ambassadors by a joint recommendation of the Foreign Minister and the Commission of Foreign Affairs of the Saeima (Section 10).

6. The Law on the National Referendum and Initiation of Legislation – specifies the regulations of the Constitution of the Republic of Latvia and the President's role in the process.

7. The Law on the Order of Proclaiming, Publishing, Coming, and Being in Force of the Laws and Other Regulatory Enactments Passed by the Saeima, president, and the Cabinet of Ministers specifies the norms of the Constitution of the Republic of Latvia and the President's role in the legislation process.

8. The Law on Military Service: The president awards officer ranks by recommendations from the minister of defence, if the relevant soldier's correspondence to requirements stated in relevant laws has been examined by the Higher Attestation Commission (Section 32.2.1). The president takes away the rank of a soldier if the soldier has been convicted of a serious or particularly serious crime (Section 34). The president has the right to relieve a soldier of active military duty during times of peace (Section 44).

9. The Law on National Security: The president is the commander-in-chief of the National Armed Forces, chairs the National Security Council, appoints the senior commander of the National Armed Forces during times of war, establishes the President's Military Council, recommends candidates to become commanders of the National Armed Forces to Parliament, and asks Parliament to decide on a proclamation or launch of war (Section 8.1).

The president has the right, at his request, to receive information that is at the disposal of government institutions and offices, taking into account the regulations on the use of information that are stated in the law (Section 8.2).

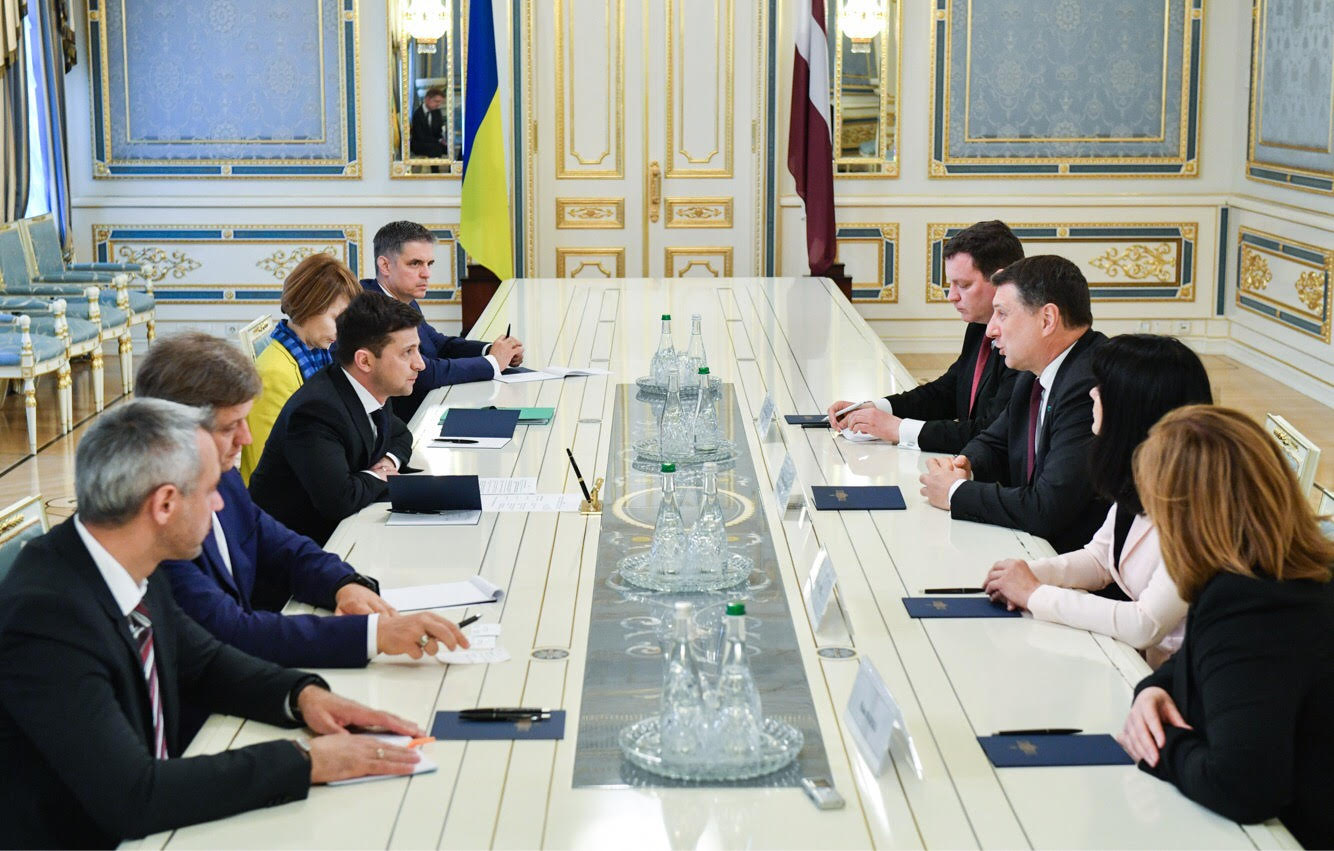
Ukrainian president Volodymyr Zelenskyy and president Raimonds Vējonis during Ukraine-Latvia talks

The president is a member of the National Security Council (Section 19).

The president summons meetings of the National Security Council (Section 21).

Upon the proclamation of war against the state or a military invasion, the president must immediately act in accordance with the regulations of the National Defence Plan, issue instructions and orders to the National Armed Forces, as well as to state and local government institutions and the people of Latvia, summon a meeting of Parliament to take a decision on the proclamation and launching of war, and appoint the senior commander of the National Armed Forces (Section 24.1).

If the president should find that Parliament could not assemble to take a decision on a proclamation of war, he must order the commander of the National Armed Forces to take full control over the functions of the senior commander (Section 24.2).

10. The competence of the president in awarding state awards is defined in the Law on State Awards (valid since 7 April 2004).

=== The law on the provision of functioning of the president of Latvia ===
- The president is subjected to the same limitations of the conflict of interests as the law provides regarding other state authorities (Section 13),
- The person, who has been elected president, may not join the military or specific service of other countries after leaving the office of president (Section 14),
- The President's office management is executed by the Chancery of the President of Latvia, which settles the matters connected with the president. The Chancery of the President of Latvia is a legal entity, and it possesses a seal with an image of the big coat-of-arms of the state.

== Election of the president ==
Presidential candidates Egils Levits, Juris Jansons and Didzis Šmits (from left to right) during the 2019 Latvian presidential election

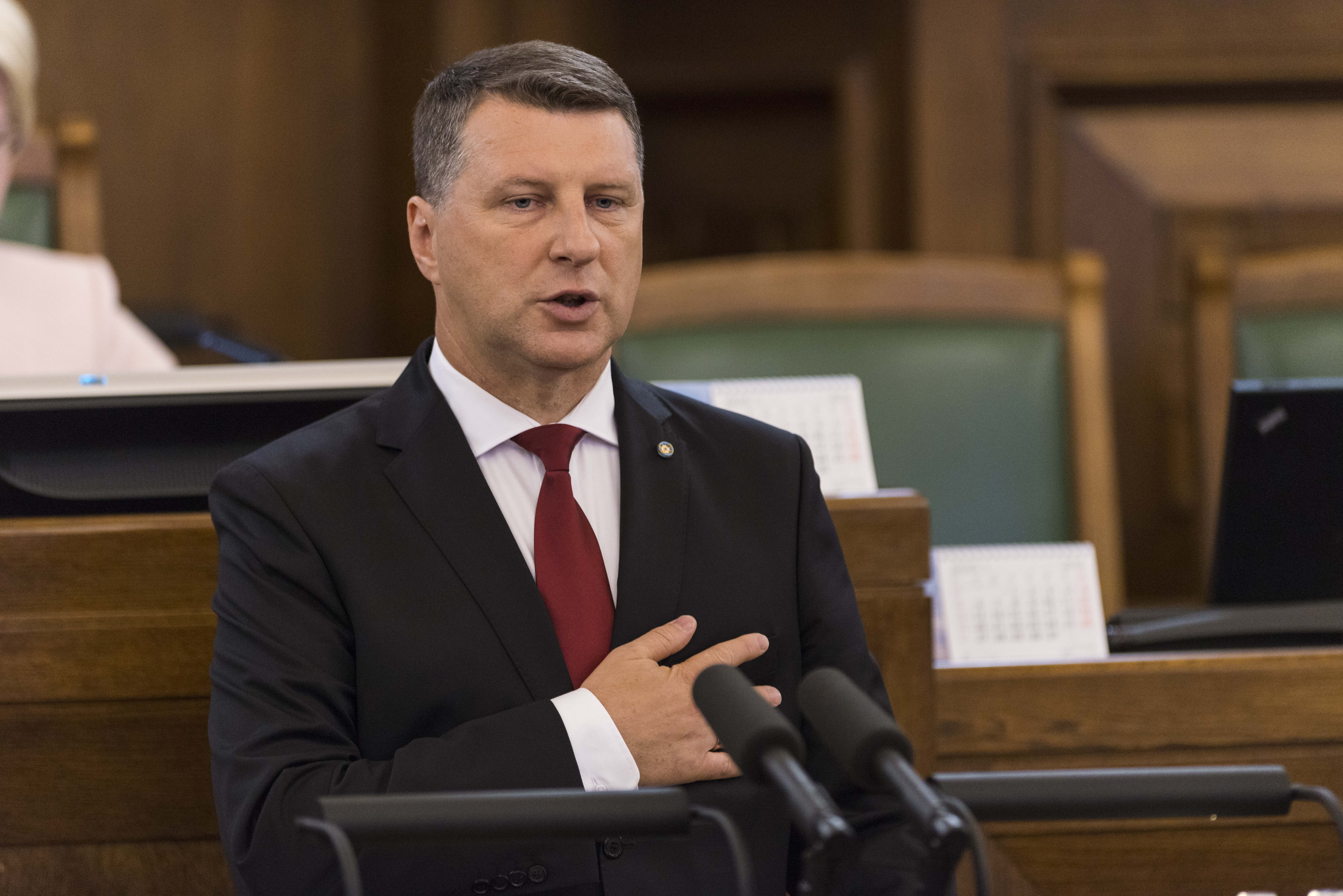
Raimonds Vējonis giving the presidential solemn oath at his inauguration ceremony

=== Eligibility ===
Any person who enjoys full rights of citizenship and who has attained the age of forty years may be elected president. A person with dual citizenship may not be elected president.

The office of the president must not be held concurrently with any other office. If the person elected as president is a Member of the Saeima, they have to resign their mandate as a Member of the Saeima.

=== Elections and inauguration ===
An individual receiving the absolute majority of the total number of deputies in the first round is elected president.

If no one is elected in the first round, another round is organized with the same candidates or different ones, and under the same requirements to receive an absolute majority of votes. If no one is still elected after the second round, additional rounds are held minus the least voted candidate in the previous one, until a candidate receives 51 votes and becomes President of Latvia. The president of the Saeima chairs the electoral college.

At the first sitting of the Saeima held after the election of the president, the president, on assuming office, shall take the following solemn oath: “I swear that all of my work will be dedicated to the welfare of the people of Latvia. I will do everything in my power to promote the prosperity of the Republic of Latvia and all who live here. I will hold sacred and will observe the Constitution of Latvia and the laws of the State. I will act justly towards all and will fulfil my duties conscientiously.”

== Incumbency ==
=== Term limit ===
The Saeima elects the president for a term of four years (Article 35 of the Constitution of the Republic of Latvia). The same person must not hold office as president for more than eight consecutive years.

=== Vacancies and succession ===
If the president resigns from office, dies or is removed from office before their term has ended in such cases, the chairperson of the Saeima assumes the duties of the president until the Saeima has elected a new president. Similarly, the chairperson of the Saeima assumes the duties of the president if the latter is away from Latvia or is unable to fulfil the duties of the office or any other reason.

Upon the proposal of not less than half of all of the members of the Saeima, the Saeima may decide, in a closed session and with a majority vote of not less than two-thirds of all of its Members, to remove the president from office.

If the president has initiated the dissolution of the Saeima, but more than half of the votes are cast against the dissolution of the Saeima in the referendum, then the president shall be deemed to be removed from office, and the Saeima shall elect a new president to serve for the remaining term of office of the president so removed.

=== Residence ===
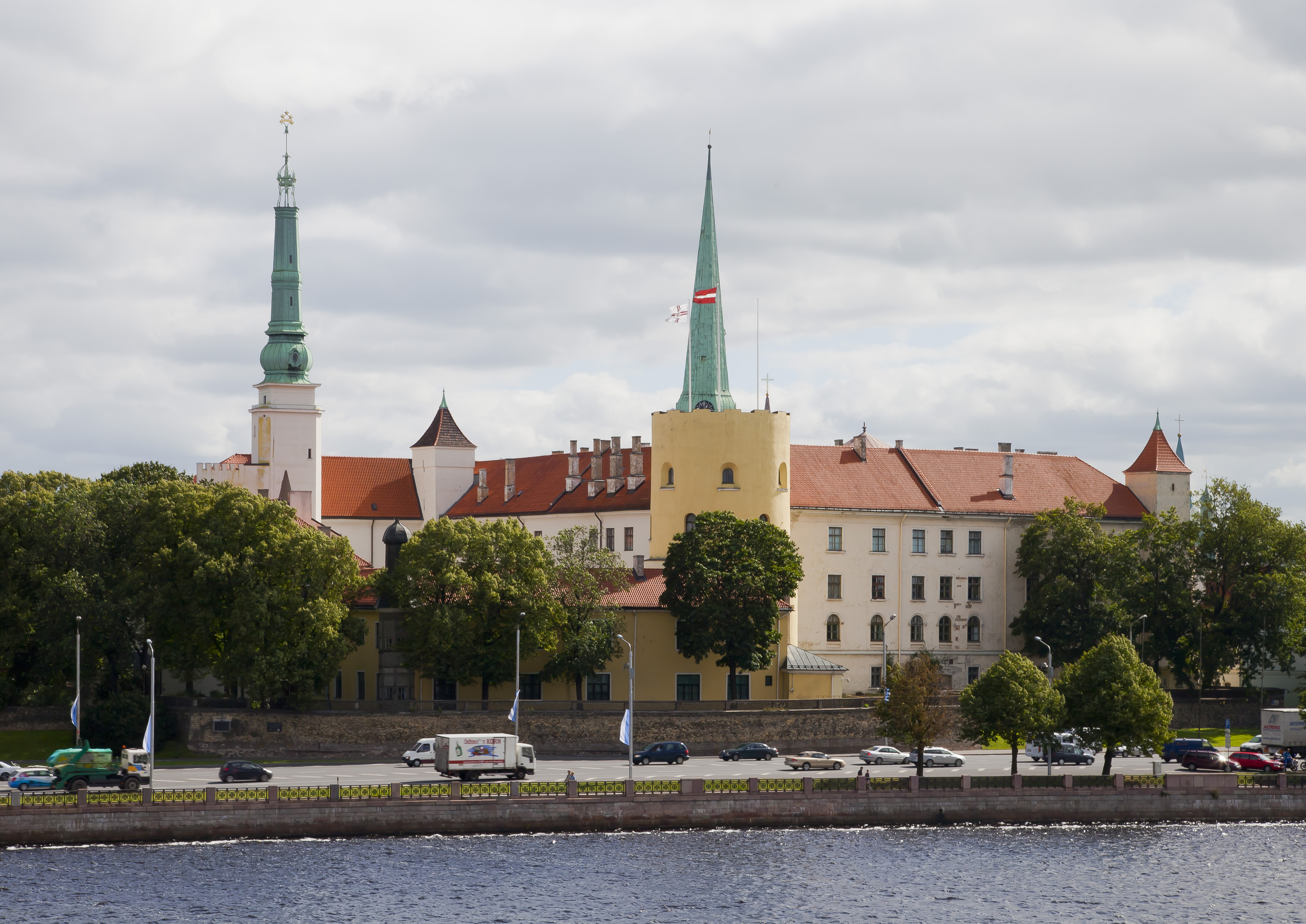
Riga Castle, the official presidential residence

Riga Castle is the official residence of the President since 1922. In 1938 and 1939 the castle was expanded to its now iconic look with the addition of the Three Stars Tower (the highest of all six) and renovated in Art Deco style by architect Eižens Laube. During the Soviet occupation Riga Castle hosted the 'Pioneer Castle'. By 1994 it had been renovated to once again meet the needs of the president. It has four floors, multiple halls for guests, a large office for the president, multiple museum halls hosting diplomatic gifts from heads of state of other countries.

The 3-story Jūrmala Residence is the official retreat for the president of Latvia. Built in 1971 to host high ranking Soviet officials during their stay in Latvia, it was renovated for the needs of the president of Latvia in 1993. Andris Bērziņš refused to use the Jūrmala residence due to its past as a guest house for Soviet officials. It hosts a large park, an indoor swimming pool, a guest room for meeting diplomatic guests, a personal beach on the shores of Jūrmala. It has a basketball hoop, that was built for the needs of president Zatlers.

During renovations in Riga Castle in the 1990s, presidents used the Maikapars' House in central Riga as their temporary residence until 1995. After a devastating fire in 2013, the President resided at the House of the Blackheads until 2016. During renovations in 2019, president Levits stayed in a guest house.

=== Travel ===
The president uses a Lexus car for his or her everyday travel. For longer trips, they take a Latvian Armed Forces helicopter. For international travel, the president does not have an official aircraft and uses an AirBaltic plane, a Latvian state-owned airline.

== Post-presidency ==
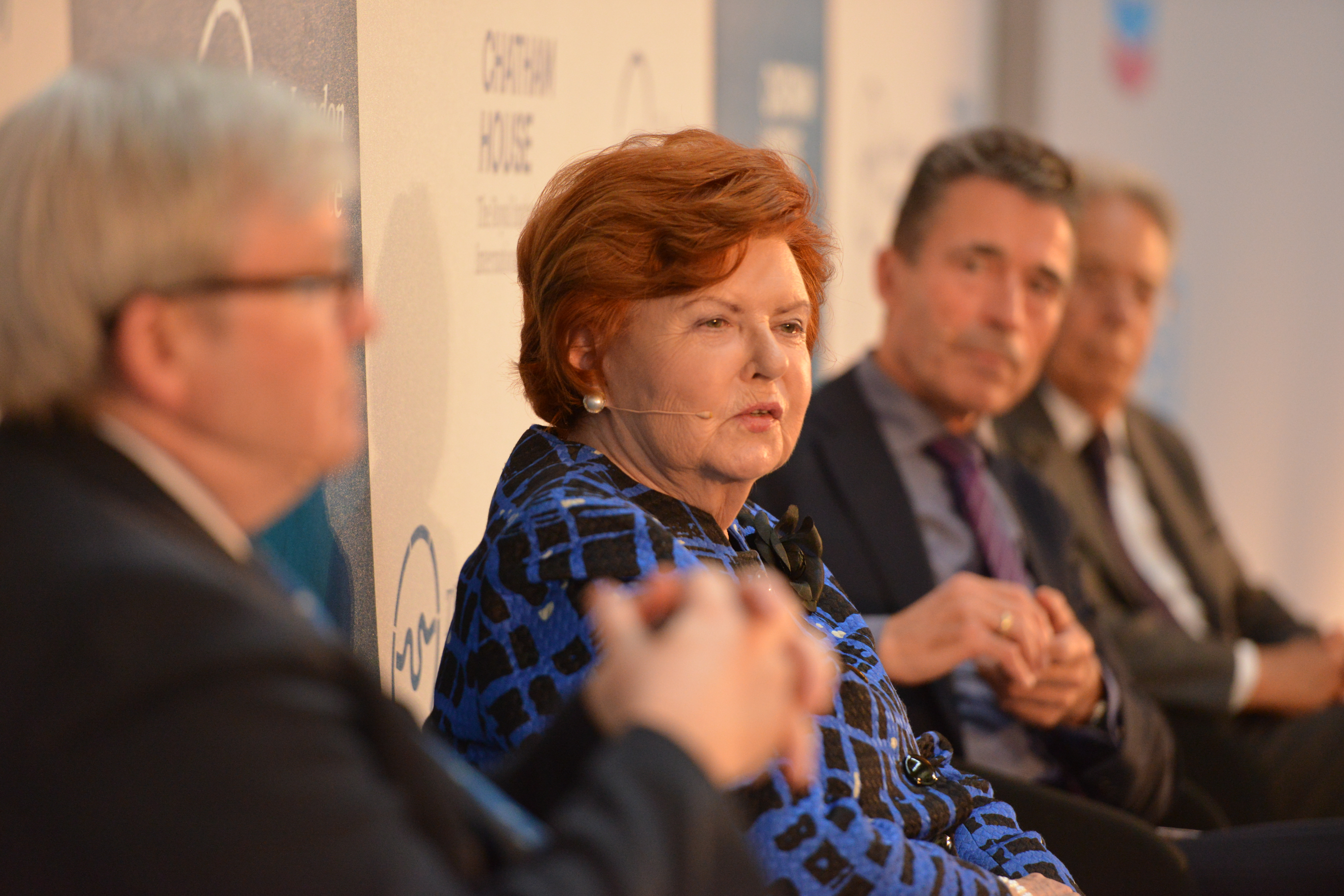
Dr. Vaira Vīķe-Freiberga speaking at the 2015 London Conference in Chatham House

After the presidency, the president may retire from politics, although there are exceptions. For example, Gorbunovs was the face of the political party Latvian Way in 1995, and Zatlers of the Reform Party in 2012. Vīķe-Freiberga continues to give lectures and educate on politics in Latvia and abroad.

Every former president receives their office, staff, and a car as well as security and an apartment in the center of Riga.

Former presidents also receive a pension according to their salary.

== List of presidents ==
Parties

DC LSDSP LZS LTF LC ZZS LZP V None

Status

Acting President

No.	Portrait	Name (Birth–Death)	Elected	Term of office		Political party
1		Jānis Čakste (1859–1927) (Note: Upon Latvian independence on 17 December 1918, Jānis Čakste was head of state as Chairman of the People's Council of Latvia (1918–20) and Speaker of the Constitutional Assembly (1920–22), until he was elected President by the first Saeima on 14 November 1922.)	—	17 December 1918	14 November 1922	Democratic Centre
1		Jānis Čakste (1859–1927)	1922	14 November 1922	14 March 1927	Democratic Centre
—		Pauls Kalniņš (1872–1945) (Note: Upon Čakste's death, Speaker of the Saeima Pauls Kalniņš was acting president from 14 March 1927 to 8 April 1927.)	—	14 March 1927	8 April 1927	Latvian Social Democratic Workers' Party
2		Gustavs Zemgals (1871–1939)	1927	8 April 1927	11 April 1930	Democratic Centre
3		Alberts Kviesis (1881–1944)	1930	11 April 1930	15 May 1934	Latvian Farmers' Union
(3)		Alberts Kviesis (1881–1944)	1933	16 May 1934	10 April 1936	Independent
4		Kārlis Ulmanis (1877–1942) (Note: Upon the expiration of Kviesis's term, Prime minister Kārlis Ulmanis illegally merged the Presidency and the Premiership, holding both offices himself. After the Soviet occupation Prime Minister Augusts Kirhenšteins was the illegitimate Acting President from 21 July to 25 August 1940)	—	11 April 1936	21 July 1940	Independent
Occupation of Latvia (21 July 1940 – 21 August 1991)
Pauls Kalniņš served as acting president from 1944 to 1945
Jāzeps Rancāns served as acting president from 1947 to 1969
—		Anatolijs Gorbunovs (born 1942) (Note: After the restoration of Latvian independence, speaker of the Latvian parliament Anatolijs Gorbunovs was acting president from 21 August 1991 to 8 July 1993.)	—	21 August 1991	13 February 1993	Popular Front of Latvia
(—)		Anatolijs Gorbunovs (born 1942)	—	13 February 1993	8 July 1993	Latvian Way
5		Guntis Ulmanis (born 1939)	1993; 1996	8 July 1993	8 July 1999	Latvian Farmers' Union
6		Vaira Vīķe-Freiberga (born 1937)	1999; 2003	8 July 1999	8 July 2007	Independent
7		Valdis Zatlers (born 1955)	2007	8 July 2007	8 July 2011	Independent
8		Andris Bērziņš (born 1944)	2011	8 July 2011	8 July 2015	Union of Greens and Farmers (Note: Bērziņš is not a member of parties forming the Union of Greens and Farmers, however he ran for the Saeima from their list and was a member of their parliamentary group at the time of his election.)
9		Raimonds Vējonis (born 1966)	2015	8 July 2015	8 July 2019	Latvian Green Party
10		Egils Levits (born 1955)	2019	8 July 2019	8 July 2023	Independent (Note: Nominated by the National Alliance.)
11		Edgars Rinkēvičs (born 1973)	2023	8 July 2023	Incumbent (Term ends on 8 July 2027)	Unity (Note: Nominated by and a member of Unity during election, however left the party before the start of the term.)

== See also ==
- List of presidents of Latvia by age
- Lists of office-holders
- List of chairmen of the Presidium of the Supreme Soviet of the Latvian Soviet Socialist Republic ("head of state" during the occupation era)
- Prime Minister of Latvia
