= 1930 Latvian presidential election =

← 1927	April 8–9, 1930	1933 →
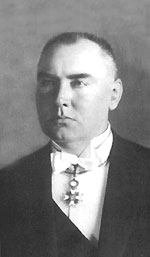

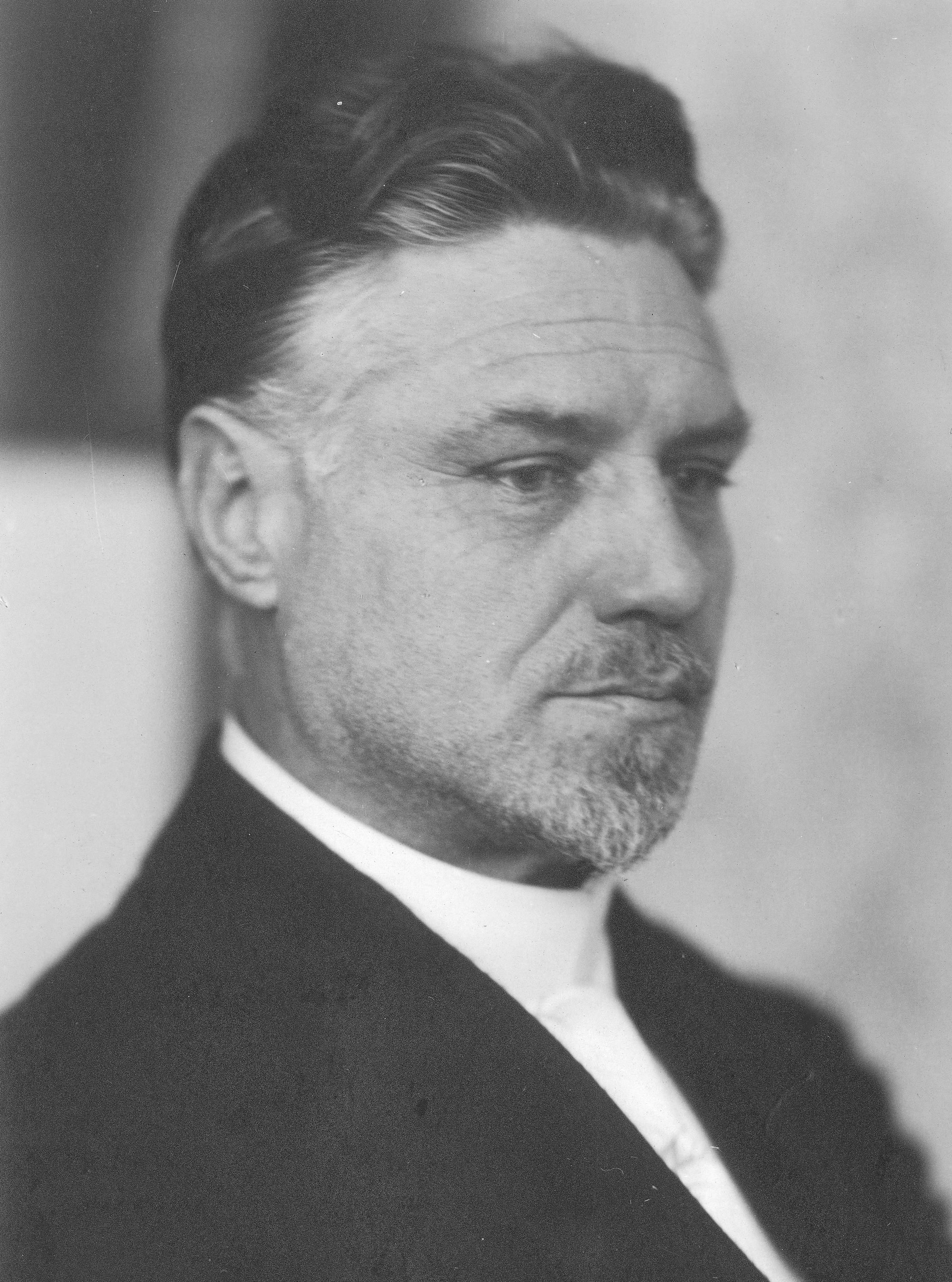
Nominee	Alberts Kviesis	Pauls Kalniņš
Party	LZS	LSDSP
Electoral vote	55	Excluded
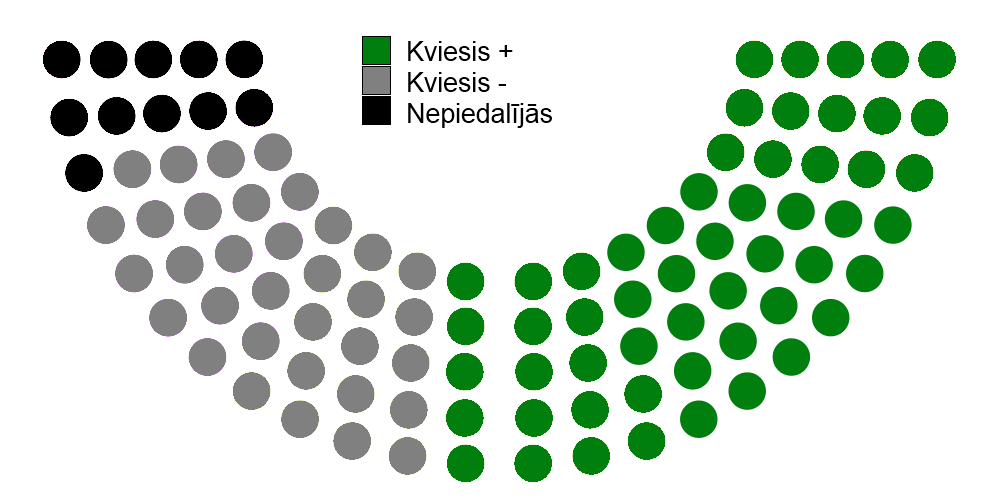
- Votes by MPs
President before election
Gustavs Zemgals
Democratic Centre
Elected President
Alberts Kviesis
LZS

The 1930 presidential elections in Latvia took place in April 8 and 9, 1930, during the term of the 3rd Saeima. Incumbent president Gustavs Zemgals refused to run again, so, like in the 1927 elections, many rounds of voting were required until the Latvian Farmers' Union candidate Alberts Kviesis was elected president and became the 3rd President of Latvia.

== Candidates ==
Candidate	Party
Alberts Kviesis	Latvian Farmers' Union
Pauls Kalniņš	LSDSP
Ernests Miezis	Communist Party of Latvia

== Election process and results ==
The presidential election began on April 8, 1930. In the first round of elections, the Chairman of the Chamber of Courts Alberts Kviesis, the long-term Speaker of the Saeima from the LSDSP Pauls Kalniņš and the Communist candidate Ernests Miezis participated. In the first vote, Kviesis received 47 votes, Kalniņš received 36 votes, and Miezis received 6. In the second vote, Kviesis received 47 votes, Kalniņš received 32, and Miezis received 5. In the third vote, the candidates were Kviesis and Kalniņš. Kviesis received 46 votes while Kalniņš received 33. In the fourth round there was only one candidat, Kviesis, who received 49 votes. Consequently, the elections were planned to continue at the next sitting of the Saeima.

Elections continued on April 9. Kviesis and Kalniņš were nominated as candidates for the second round. In the first ballot, Kviesis received 47 votes, Kalniņš received 35. In the second ballot, Kviesis again received 47 votes, Kalniņš while received 36. Only Kviesis took part in the third ballot, who received 55 votes and was elected president.

Candidate	Party	Votes	%
Gustavs Zemgals	Latvian Farmers' Union	55	61.80
Against		34	38.20
Total		89	100.00
