= 1922 Latvian presidential election =

November 14, 1922	1925 →
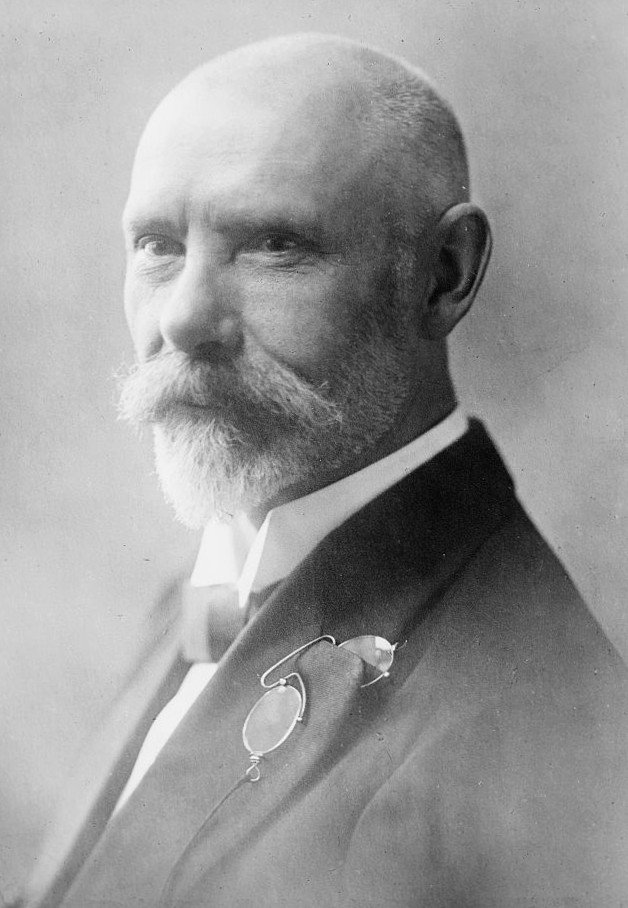
Nominee	Jānis Čakste
Party	Democratic Centre
Electoral vote	92
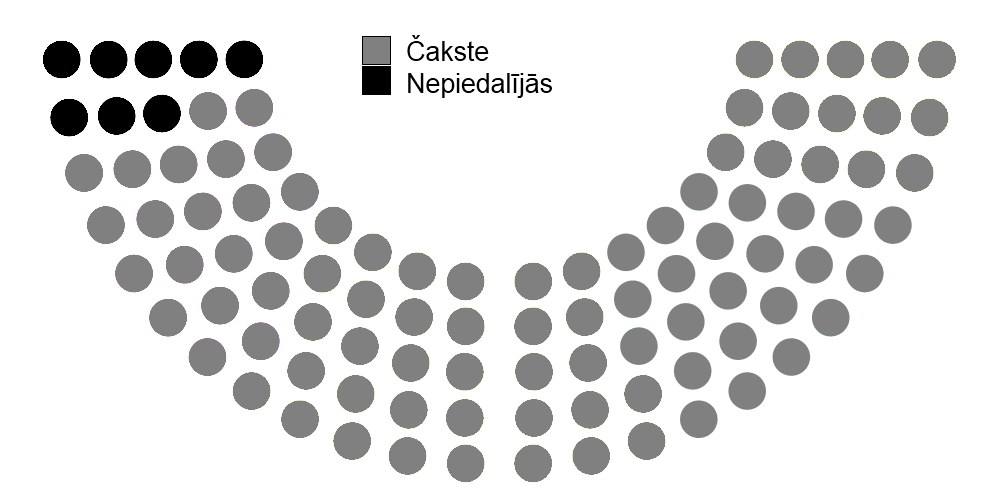
- Votes by MPs
Elected President
Jānis Čakste
Democratic Centre

The 1922 presidential elections in Latvia took place on November 14, 1922. By agreement between the Latvian Social Democratic Workers' Party and the Latvian Farmers' Union, Jānis Čakste was nominated as the sole candidate and elected the 1st President of Latvia with 92 votes in favor and 6 abstentions. The President was elected by the 1st Saeima.

== Candidates ==
Candidate
Jānis Čakste

== Election process and results ==
Prior to the elections, the former Chairman of the Constitutional Assembly Jānis Čakste; the organizer of the Latvian Riflemen Battalions, the former Minister of Agriculture Jānis Goldmanis and the Minister of Justice Jānis Pauļuks were all considered as possible candidates for the presidency. Kārlis Ulmanis had refused to run for office, but there were still rumors that the Social Democrats could run the famous poet Rainis as their candidate. In the end, only Čakste was nominated, and with 92 votes (the largest support for a candidate in the history of presidential elections), he became the first President of Latvia.

Candidate	Party	Votes	%
Jānis Čakste	Democratic Centre	92	93.88
Against		6	6.12
Total		98	100.00
