= 1925 Latvian presidential election =

← 1922	November 6, 1925	1927 →
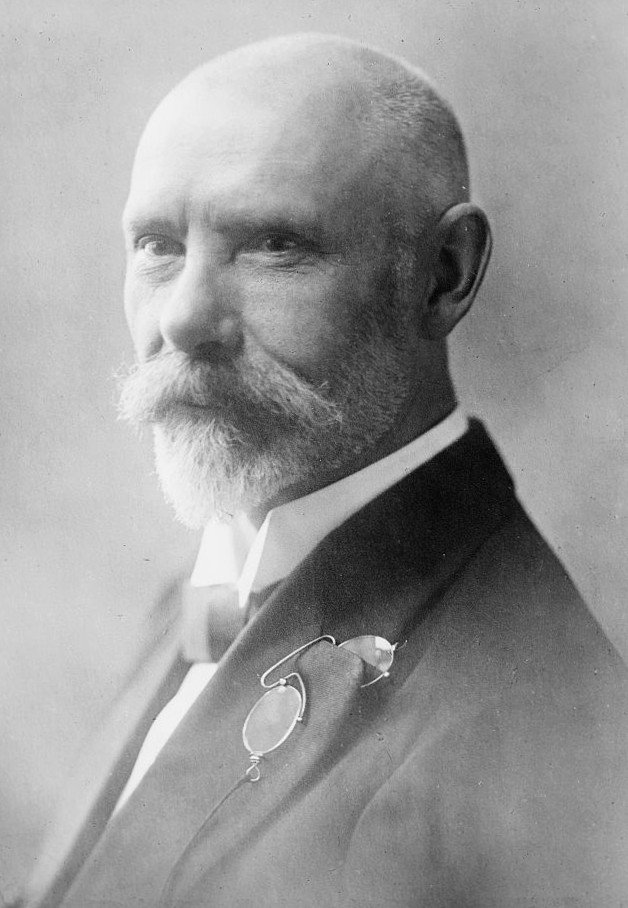

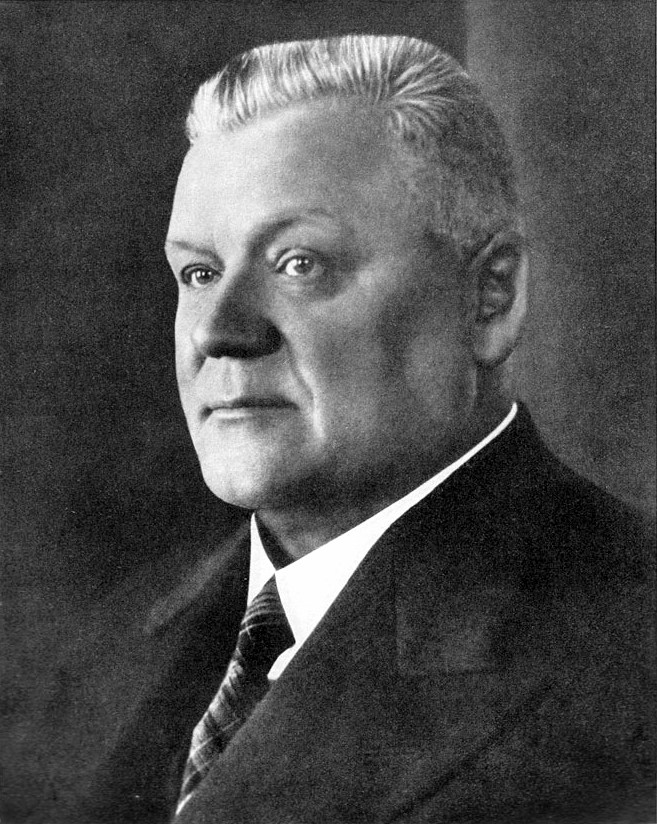

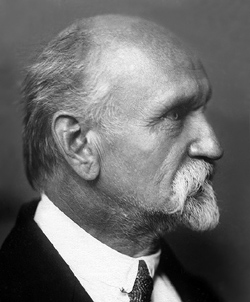
Nominee	Jānis Čakste	Kārlis Ulmanis	Jānis Pliekšāns
Party	Democratic Centre	LZS	LSDSP
Electoral vote	60	31	Withdrew
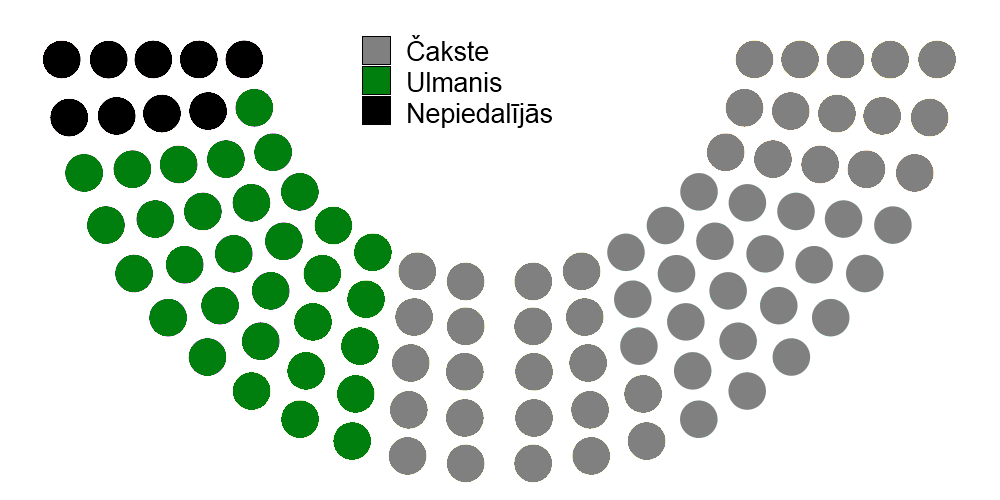
- Votes by MPs
President before election
Jānis Čakste
Democratic Centre
Elected President
Jānis Čakste
Democratic Centre

The 1925 presidential elections in Latvia took place on November 6, 1925 over a two parliamentary period. In the elections with three candidates, Jānis Čakste was re-elected as the President of Latvia.

== Candidates ==
Candidate	Party
Jānis Čakste	Democratic Centre
Kārlis Ulmanis	Latvian Farmers' Union
Jānis Pliekšāns (Rainis)	LSDSP

== Election process and results ==
The first ballot failed to elect the president because no candidate received more than 50 votes. Jānis Pliekšāns won 33 votes, Kārlis Ulmanis won 32, and Čakste won 29. Each candidate only received the total number of votes of members of the same party. In the second ballot, the LSDSP withdrew Pliekšāns' candidacy, which thus gave Čakste a comfortable majority of 60 votes.

Candidate	Party	First round		Second round	
Candidate	Party	Votes	%	Votes	%
Jānis Pliekšāns	Latvian Social Democratic Workers' Party	33	35.11		
Kārlis Ulmanis	Latvian Farmers' Union	32	34.04	31	34.07
Jānis Čakste	Democratic Centre	29	30.85	60	65.93
Total		94	100.00	91	100.00
