= 1933 Latvian presidential election =

| ← 1930 | 1933 | 1993 → |
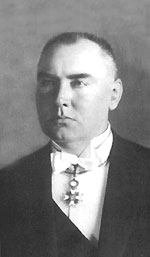

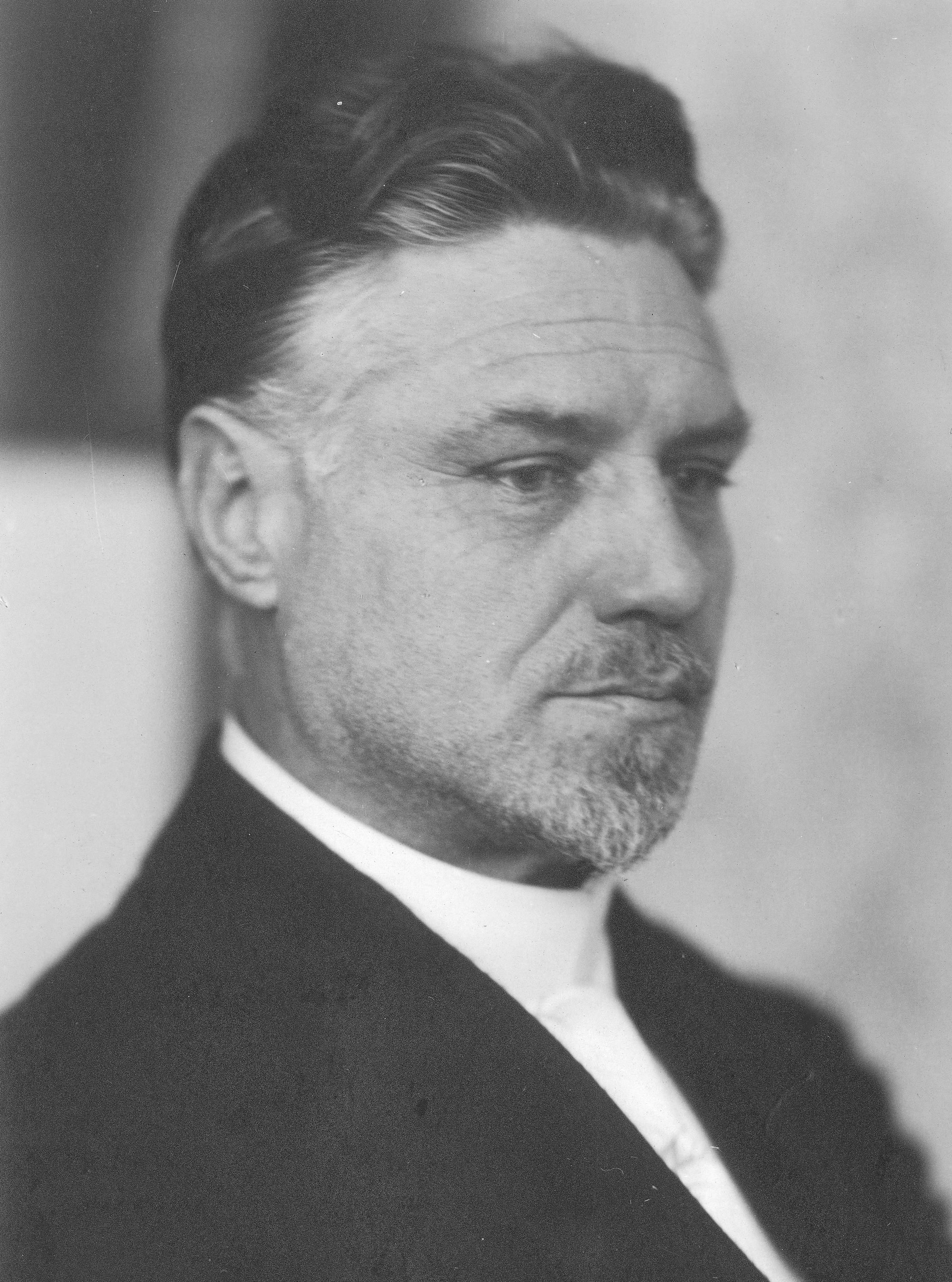

| Nominee | Alberts Kviesis | Pauls Kalniņš | Miķelis Bite |
| Party | LZS | LSDSP | Trade Union Workers and Peasants Group |
| Electoral vote | 55 | 20 | 9 |
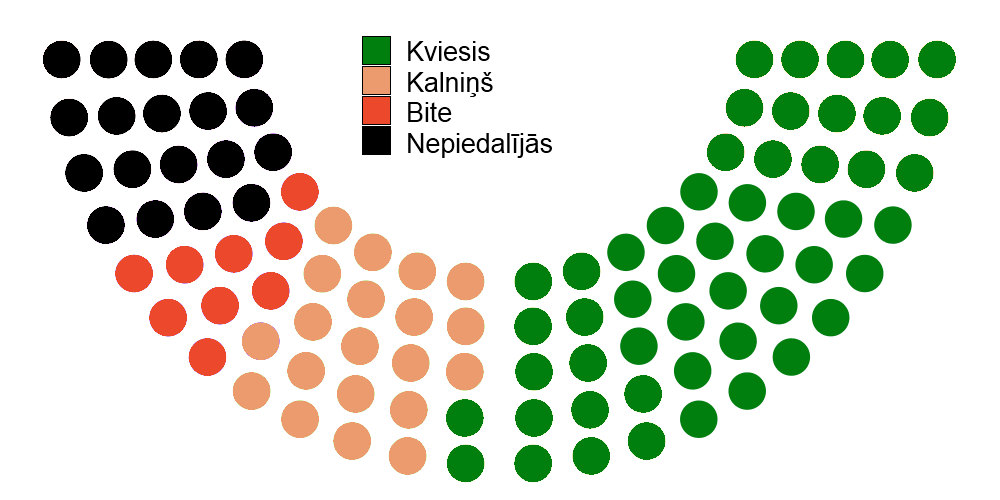
- Votes by MPs
President before election
Alberts Kviesis
LZS
Elected President
Alberts Kviesis
LZS

The 1933 presidential elections in Latvia took place on April 4, 1933, during the term of the 4th Saeima. In the first round of voting, incumbent President Alberts Kviesis was re-elected President.

== Candidates ==
| Candidate | Party |
|---|---|
| Alberts Kviesis | Latvian Farmers' Union |
| Pauls Kalniņš | LSDSP |
| Miķelis Bite | Trade Union Workers and Peasants Group (Communist Party) |

== Election process and results ==
Along with incumbent president Alberts Kviesis and Speaker of the Saeima Pauls Kalniņš, the little-known Communist candidate Miķelis Bite, who had not yet passed the deputy's mandate at the time of the elections, was nominated for the presidency. In the first round, Kviesis received a sufficient number of votes to be re-elected as president.

| Candidate | Party | Votes | % |
|---|---|---|---|
| Alberts Kviesis | Latvian Farmers' Union | 53 | 63.86 |
| Pauls Kalniņš | LSDSP | 21 | 25.30 |
| Miķelis Bite | Communist Party of Latvia | 9 | 10.84 |
| Total | | 83 | 100.00 |
