= Pēteris Juraševskis =

Latvian politician

8th Prime Minister of Latvia 8th Prime Minister of the 1st Republic
- In office 24 January 1928 – 30 November 1928
- President: Gustavs Zemgals
- Preceded by: Marģers Skujenieks
- Succeeded by: Hugo Celmiņš

Personal details
- Born: 4 April 1872 Sesava parish, Russian Empire
- Died: 10 January 1945 (aged 72) Jelgava, Latvian SSR
- Party: Democratic Centre
- Education: Saint Petersburg Imperial University
- Profession: Lawyer

Pēteris Juraševskis (Russian: Пётр Петро́вич Юраше́вский; 23 March 1872, in Sesava parish – 10 January 1945) held the office of Prime Minister of Latvia from 24 January 1928 – 30 November 1928. He was the Minister of Finance from January 1928 to March 1928.

Political offices
Preceded by Marģers Skujenieks	Prime Minister of Latvia; 24 January 1928 – 30 November 1928	Succeeded by Hugo Celmiņš
