= 1999 Latvian presidential election =

| ← 1996 | June 17, 1999 | 2003 → |
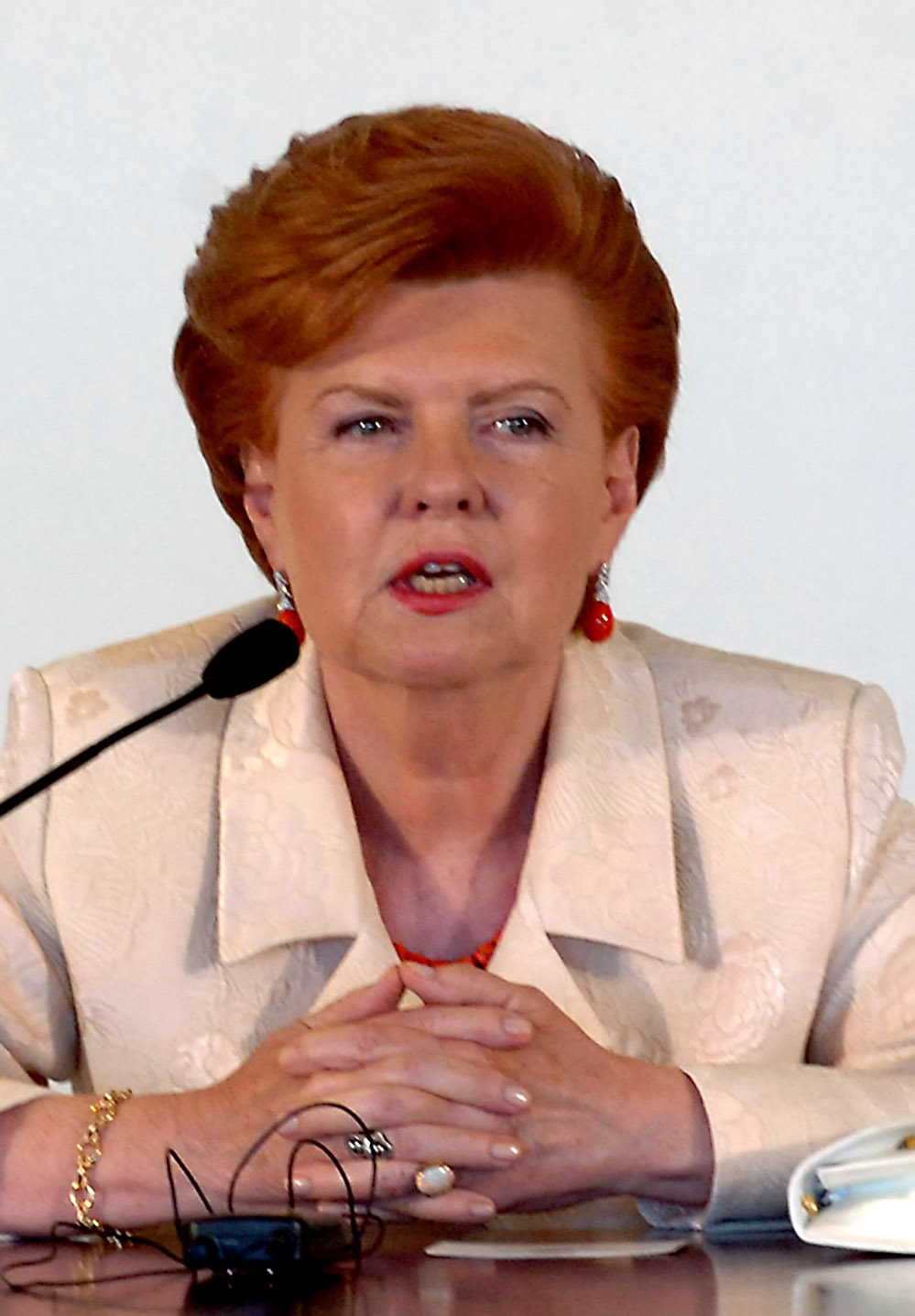

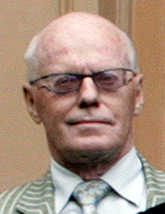

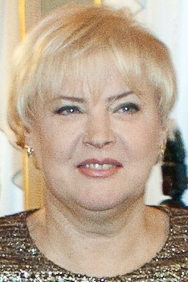
| Nominee | Vaira Vīķe-Freiberga | Valdis Birkavs | Ingrīda Ūdre |
| Party | Independent | Latvian Way | New Party (Latvia) |
| Electoral vote | 53 | 25 | 9 |
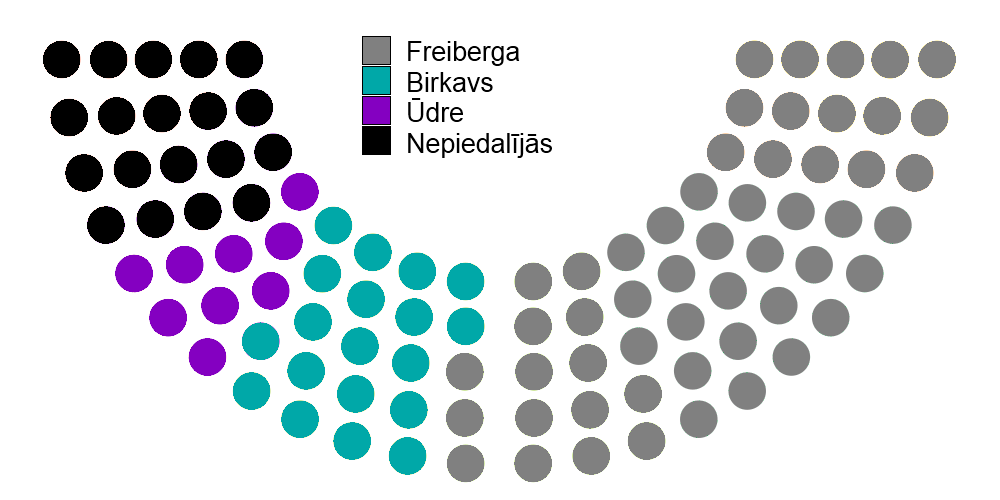
- Votes by MPs
President before election
Guntis Ulmanis
LZS
Elected President
Vaira Vīķe-Freiberga
Independent

The 1999 presidential elections in Latvia took place on June 17, 1999. After no candidate collected the required number of votes in several ballots, a break was announced at the election session, during which Raimonds Pauls, who had received the most support at the time, withdrew his candidacy. After the break, the sitting was resumed with new candidates and Vaira Vīķe-Freiberga was elected the 6th President of Latvia.

== Candidates ==
| Candidate | Party |
|---|---|
| Anatolijs Gorbunovs | Latvian Way |
| Arnis Kalniņš | LSDSP |
| Vaira Paegle | People's Party |
| Jānis Priedkalns | TB/LNNK |
| Raimonds Pauls | New Party |
| Vaira Vīķe-Freiberga | Independent, LSDSP, TB/LNNK, People's Party |
| Valdis Birkavs | Latvian Way |
| Ingrīda Ūdre | New Party |

The initial list of candidates included five candidates: Anatolijs Gorbunovs, Arnis Kalniņš, Vaira Paegle, Jānis Priedkalns and Raimonds Pauls. Vaira Vīķe-Freiberga was nominated as a candidate after failing to elect a new president in the first five rounds of voting.

== Election process and results ==
The presidential election took place on June 17 and required 6 rounds of voting to elect a new president.

In the first round of voting, Vaira Paegle and Raimonds Pauls won the largest number of votes, both at 24. As no candidate received at least 51 votes, all the same candidates took part in the second ballot. The results of the second round exactly coincided with the results of the first round: 24 votes for Pauls, 24 for Paegle, 21 for Anatolijs Gorbunovs, 17 for Jānis Priedkalns, and 14 for Arnis Kalniņš. In the third round, Kalniņš, as the owner of the smallest number of votes, no longer participated in the elections in the second round. In the third round, the largest number of votes was won by Pauls with 32 votes. Paegle received 25, Gorbunov received 23, and Priedkalns received 17. As no candidate still had the required number of votes, the 4th round of voting took place, in which Priedkalns no longer participated. A large number of deputies did not take part in the vote at all, and as a result, Paegle won the largest number of votes with 24. Pauls received 23 and Gorbunovs received 22. Paegle and Pauls took part in the fifth round of voting. Paegle won 24 votes while Pauls won 33.

Consequently, after none of the candidates had been elected by ballot, a new round of elections had to take place with the same or different candidates. After the adjournment of the Saeima sitting, Pauls announced that he had decided to withdraw his candidacy. Consequently, it was necessary to start the vote again, either with the old candidates or with the nominated new ones.

The sitting resumed at 9 p.m. with new candidates Vaira Vīķe-Freiberga, Ingrīda Ūdre and Valdis Birkavs. The results of the first vote for these candidates were as follows: Ūdre received 12 votes, Valdis Birkavs received 21 votes, and Vaira Vīķe-Freiberga received 50 votes. A total of 84 ballot papers were received, but the vote of one of them caused confusion. Namely, it was not clear whether it should be considered a vote against all candidates or a vote for Vike-Freiberga. As the tellers could not agree on which of these options to accept, it was decided to repeat the vote as a repeat of the first ballot and not as a second ballot. In the repeat vote, Vike-Freiberga received 53 votes and was elected President of Latvia.

| Candidate | Party | Votes | % |
|---|---|---|---|
| Vaira Vīķe-Freiberga | Independent | 53 | 60.92 |
| Valdis Birkavs | Latvian Way | 25 | 28.74 |
| Ingrīda Ūdre | New Party | 9 | 10.34 |
| Total | | 87 | 100.00 |
