= 2003 Latvian presidential election =

Presidential election in Latvia

← 1999	June 20, 2003	2007 →
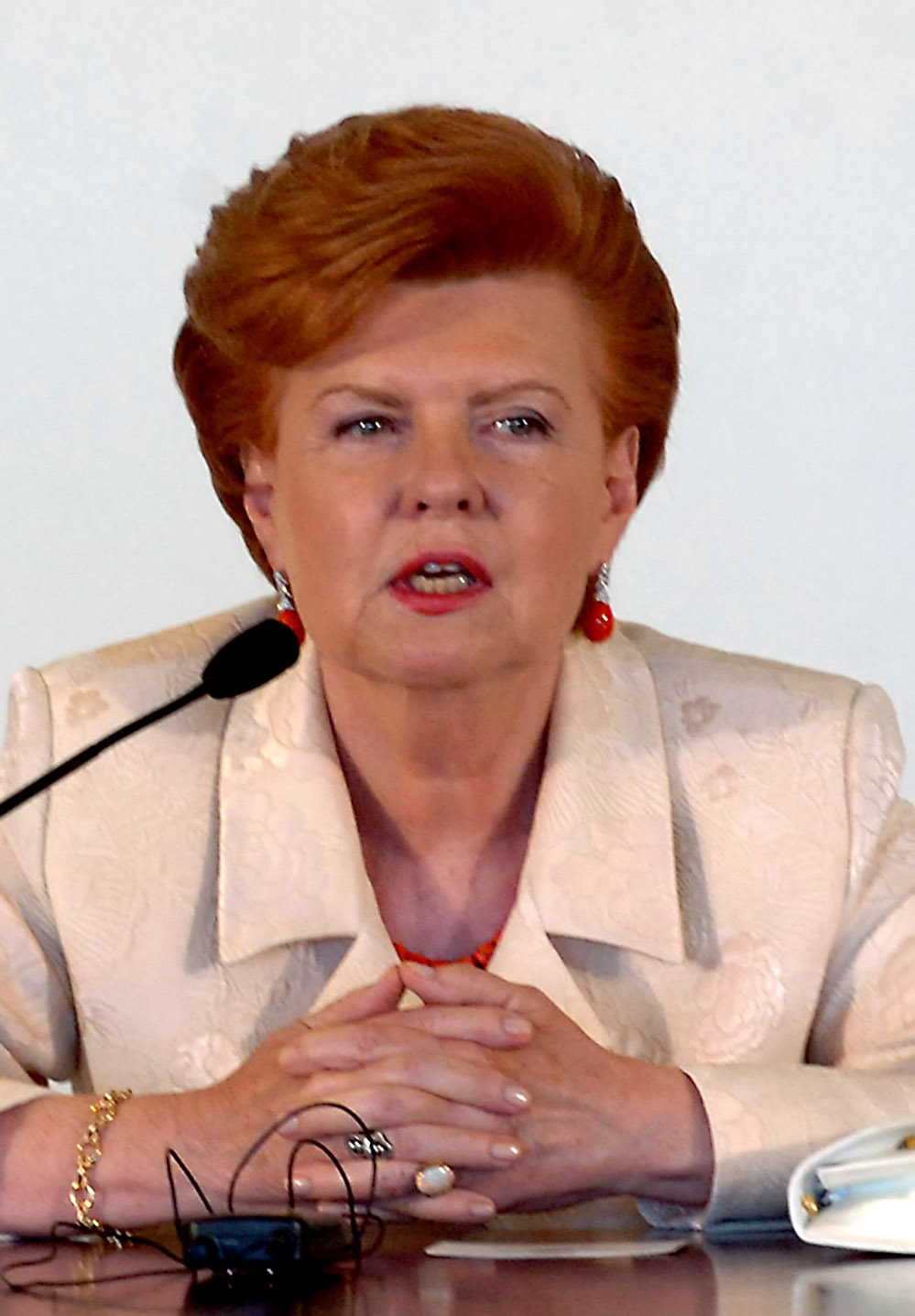
Nominee	Vaira Vīķe-Freiberga
Party	Independent
Electoral vote	88
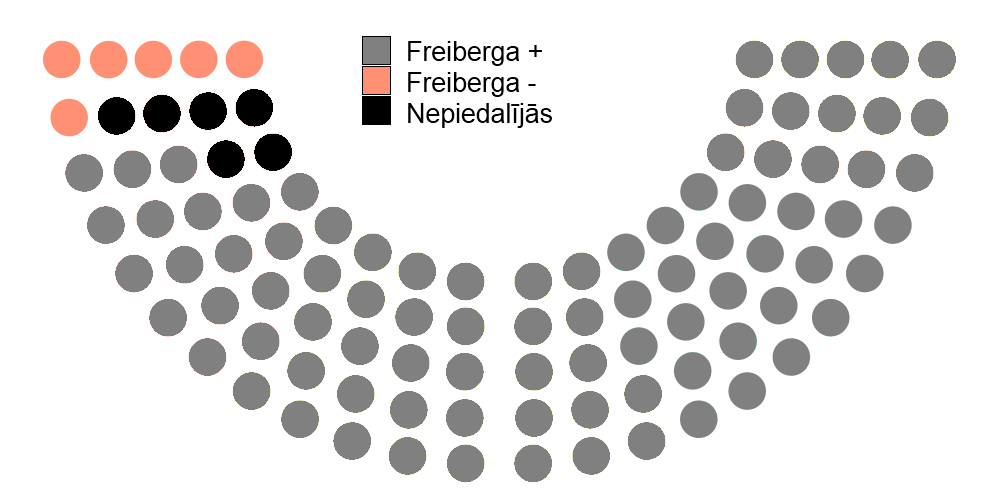
- Votes by MPs
President before election
Vaira Vīķe-Freiberga
Independent
Elected President
Vaira Vīķe-Freiberga
Independent

Indirect presidential elections were held in Latvia on 20 June 2003. The incumbent, Vaira Vīķe-Freiberga, was re-elected by the Saeima to serve a second four-year term with an overwhelming majority.

== Candidates ==
Candidate
Vaira Vīķe-Freiberga

== Election process and results ==
The 2003 presidential election is currently (as of 2019) the only election after the restoration of the independence of Latvia with only a single candidate fielded. Votes were cast by secret ballot, with each MP entering the voting room one by one. Vīķe-Freiberga received the necessary number of votes in the first round, receiving 88 votes, becoming the third president to be re-elected after Jānis Čakste and Guntis Ulmanis and having received the 2nd highest number of votes in the election since Čakste in the 1922 elections.

All members of parliament from the New Era Party, TB/LNNK, Union of Greens and Farmers, the Latvian First Party, People's Party and National Harmony Party, who had pledged support for the incumbent, took part in the vote. The fraction of the Socialist Party of Latvia had announced before that they will vote against the president, but the four deputies of For Human Rights in a United Latvia decided to be absent from the vote.

Vaira Vīķe-Freiberga was sworn in on July 8, 2003.

Candidate	For	Against
Vaira Vīķe-Freiberga	88	6
