= Sesava Parish =

Parish of Latvia

- parish of Latvia
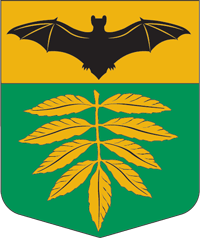
- Coat of arms

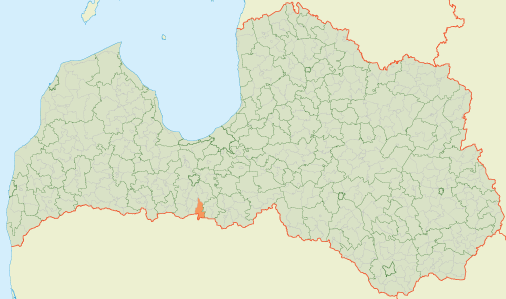
- Coordinates: 56°24′43″N 23°48′11″E
- Country: Latvia

Population (1 January 2026)
  - Total: 1,297
- Time zone: Eastern European Time

Sesava Parish (Latvian: Sesavas pagasts) is an administrative unit of Jelgava Municipality in the Semigallia region of Latvia.

== Towns, villages and settlements of Sesava parish ==
- Sesava – parish administrative center

== Notable people ==
- Pēteris Juraševskis (1872–1945)
- Ludvigs Bolšteins (1888–1940)

== See also ==
- Galamuiža Manor
