= Gustavs Zemgals =

President of Latvia from 1927 to 1930

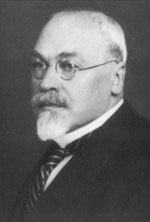
- Zemgals in 1927

2nd President of Latvia
- In office 8 April 1927 – 9 April 1930
- Prime Minister: Marģers Skujenieks; Pēteris Juraševskis; Hugo Celmiņš
- Preceded by: Pauls Kalniņš (Acting)
- Succeeded by: Alberts Kviesis

Personal details
- Born: 12 August 1871 Džūkste parish, Courland Governorate, Russian Empire (now Tukums Municipality, Latvia)
- Died: 6 January 1939 (aged 67) Riga, Latvia
- Party: Democratic Centre (1922–1934)
- Spouse: Emīlija Zemgals
- Children: 2
- Awards: Order of the Three Stars; Legion of Honor, Commander Class

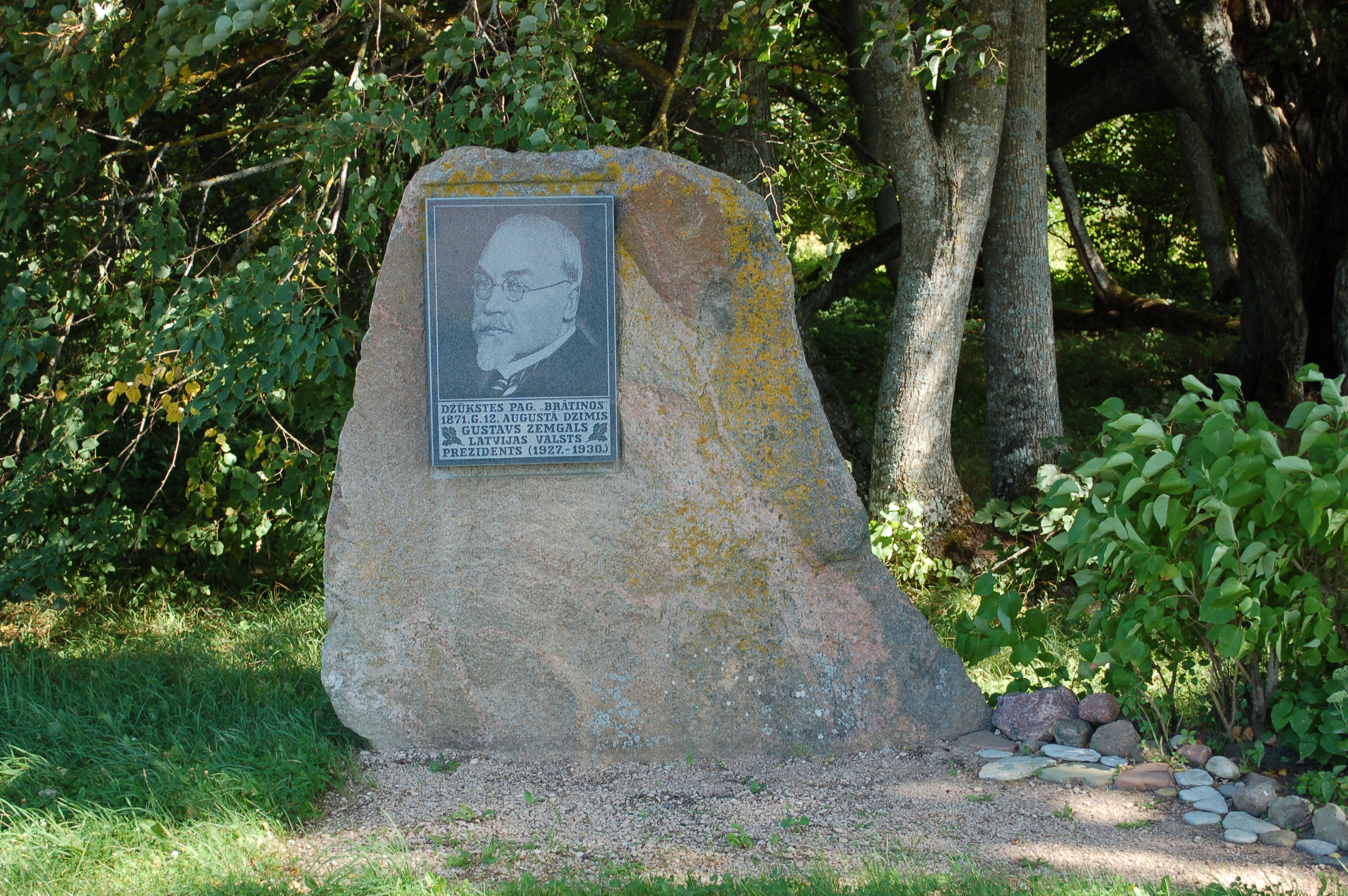
Monument to Gustavs Zemgals in Džūkste

Gustavs Zemgals (12 August 1871 – 6 January 1939) was a Latvian politician and the second President of Latvia. He also was twice the mayor of Riga.

Zemgals was born in Džūkste in the Courland Governorate (now Tukums Municipality, Latvia). He attended elementary school in a small parish of Saka, and later continued education in Riga Nikolai Gymnasium. He graduated from Moscow University in 1899 with a degree in law. He then returned to Latvia and was a lawyer, a newspaper editor and a political activist.

In 1904, during the Russo-Japanese War, Zemgals was mobilised and sent to the front, where he spent a year and a half and was promoted to the rank of captain.

After his return to Latvia in 1905, Zemgals became one of the creators of a new liberal newspaper "Jaunā Dienas Lapa" (New Day's Page) and proceeded to become an editor of this paper. He was also an editor in the newspaper that succeeded "Jaunā Dienas Lapa" -"Mūsu Laiki" (Our Times). In July 1907, the Riga district court sentenced Zemgals to a three months long arrest for his work at "Mūsu Laiki". Soon after that, Zemgals created the Latvian democratic party together with some other political activities. In the time period between 1912 and 1914 Zemgals also worked on a magazine "Domas" (Thoughts).

When World War I began, Zemgals was once again mobilised and initially assigned to an infantry division in the middle part of Latvia, but later he was sent to Finland. After his return to Riga, Zemgals was elected as the chairman of the city on 23 April 1917. In autumn 1917 the Riga Temporary Council repeatedly elected Zemgals as the chairman of the city. At this time, he was active in the Latvian radical-democratic party.

From 1918, Zemgals became active in the Latvian Provisional National Council, where he worked on matters related to occupied Latvian territories. As a member of the Latvian radical-democratic party, he became the second deputy of the chairman of Tautas Padome (People's Council), a representative body (council) of Latvian political parties and organizations. Holding this office, he chaired the 18 November 1918 meeting of Tautas Padome, which declared the independence of Latvia. On 3 December 1918 he was elected as the chair of Riga City Council.

When the bolsheviks were gaining power and approaching Latvia, the Tautas Padome sent Jānis Čakste and Zemgals abroad to represent Latvian interests. Cakste, Zemgals and several other people from the government went to Copenhagen on a British warship, but Zemgals returned to Latvia just two months later, where he tried to restore the Tautas Padome, but Zemgals along with a group of loyal politicians was arrested by the German army.

Later, he was a member of Latvian parliament (Saeima) from the Democratic Centre and a minister in several governments. In 1927, after the death of Jānis Čakste he was elected the president of Latvia. As the president, he interfered very little with the Saeima's work on laws, only returning a law for review to the Saeima once; Zemgals, however, frequently used his rights to grant amnesty. During his time as president, Zemgals granted amnesty to 648 persons, 172 of which received complete amnesty. He served as president until 1930, when his term expired, and he refused to run for a second term, despite having been asked by many to do so.

After his presidency ended, Zemgals continued his political activities and was elected in the fourth Saeima where he was a member of the foreign and finance, trade and industry commissions. From 1931 to 1932 he was also the Minister of Finance.

In 1924, the French government awarded Zemgals the Legion of Honour (the highest French order of merit), Commander cross (Commandeur). In 1926, he was awarded the Three Star Order (the highest Latvian national award), Third or "Commander" class (Fifth class being the lowest and First class the highest). In 1929, he was awarded the Three Star Order, First class with chain or "Commander Grand Cross with chain", a distinction only awarded 14 people in the pre-World War II era.

During the thirties, Zemgals published articles in the newspaper "Jaunākās Ziņas" (Latest News).

On 6 January 1939 Zemgals died and was buried in Riga. In 1990, a monument to Zemgals was constructed in Džūkste, place of his birth.
