= People's Council of Latvia =

Executive council and parliament of Latvia in 1918

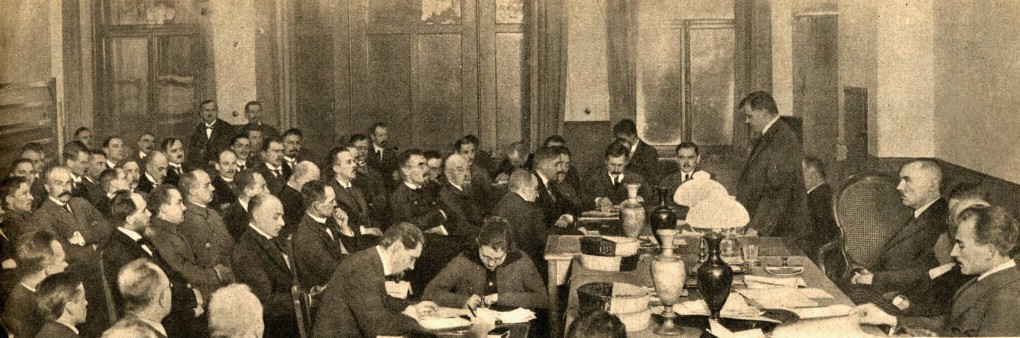
First plenary session of the People's Council of Latvia, November 1918. From right: Kārlis Ulmanis (standing), to the right of him: Alberts Kviesis (sitting)

The People's Council of Latvia (Latvian: Latvijas Tautas padome; LTP) was a temporary council which declared Latvia's independence on November 18, 1918 and then acted as the temporary parliament of the country until a Constitutional Assembly was elected.

The People's Council was formed on November 17, 1918 as a result of merging two councils of Latvian organizations: Latvian Provisional National Council (Latvian: Latvijas Pagaidu Nacionālā padome, LPNP) and the Democratic Bloc. Originally, the People's Council had 40 members representing all the major Latvian political organizations, except the far right and the far left (communists). It was later expanded to 245 representatives.

On November 18, 1918, the People's Council declared Latvia an independent country at the now National Theatre of Latvia. It chose Jānis Čakste as the President of the Council and Kārlis Ulmanis as the Prime Minister of the Latvian Provisional Government. The People's Council acted as a temporary parliament of Latvia until May 1, 1920 when the Constitutional Assembly was elected.
