= Jānis Čakste =

President of Latvia from 1918 to 1927

Jānis Kristaps Čakste
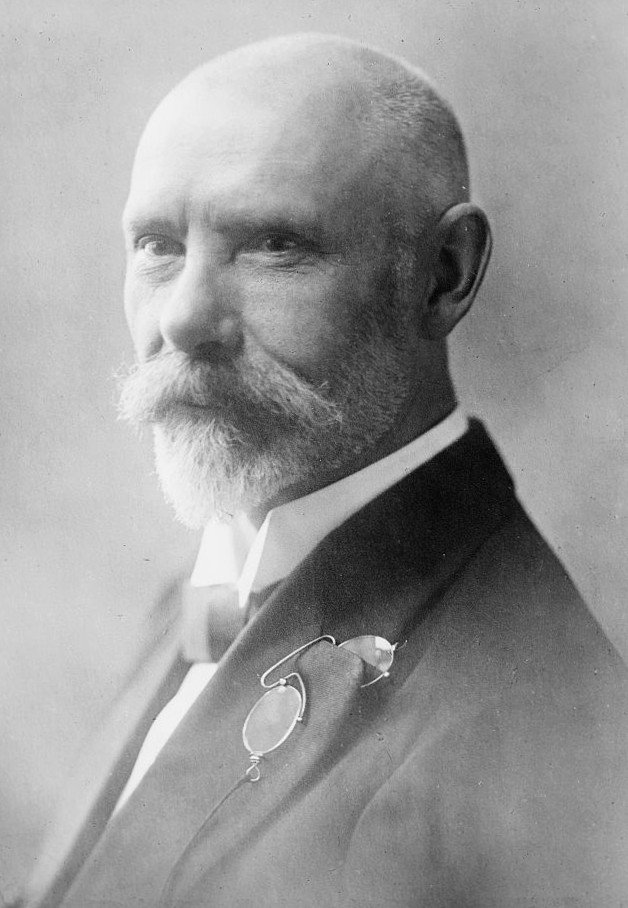
- Čakste in 1926

1st President of Latvia
- In office 17 December 1918 – 14 March 1927; Acting: 17 December 1918 – 14 November 1922
- Prime Minister: Kārlis Ulmanis; Zigfrīds Anna Meierovics; Jānis Pauļuks; Zigfrīds Anna Meierovics; Voldemārs Zāmuēls; Hugo Celmiņš; Kārlis Ulmanis; Arturs Alberings; Marģers Skujenieks
- Succeeded by: Pauls Kalniņš (Acting)

Personal details
- Born: 14 September 1859 Sesava Parish, Courland Governorate, Russian Empire (now Jelgava Municipality, Latvia)
- Died: 14 March 1927 (aged 67) Riga, Latvia
- Party: Kadets (1906); Latvian Farmers' Union (1917–1919); Democratic Centre (1922–1927)

Jānis Kristaps Čakste (Russian: Ива́н Христофо́рович Ча́ксте; 14 September 1859 – 14 March 1927) was a Latvian politician and lawyer who served as the first head of an independent Latvian state as the Chairman of the Latvian People's Council (1918–1920), the Speaker of the Latvian Constitutional Assembly (1920–1922), and as the first President of Latvia (1922–1927).

== Youth ==
Čakste was born in the Lielsesava parish of Dobele county in Courland Governorate, the son of a wealthy peasant farmer. He received his primary education at St Anne's Primary School, and entered the Academia Petrina in Jelgava, where he participated in student "evenings" advocating Young Latvian ideals. After graduating in 1882, he entered the law faculty of Moscow University. While studying in Moscow, Čakste founded the local Latvian Student Society in 1883, which later became the academic fraternity "Austrums" and actively participated in the activities of the Moscow Latvian community along with Krišjānis Valdemārs and Fricis Brīvzemnieks. Čakste graduated in 1886 and returned to Jelgava.

== Career and entry into politics ==
After returning to Latvia, he worked at the legal department of the Courland Governorate and, from 1888, as a lawyer in Jelgava. In 1889 he became the editor of the newspaper "Tēvija", which became one of the most widely read Latvian-language newspapers in Courland. In 1895 he became one of the chief organisers of the 4th All-Latvian Song Festival in Jelgava, and partly financed the event out of his own pocket. In the course of the Russian Revolution of 1905 he collaborated on a project for creating Latvian national autonomy within the Russian Empire.

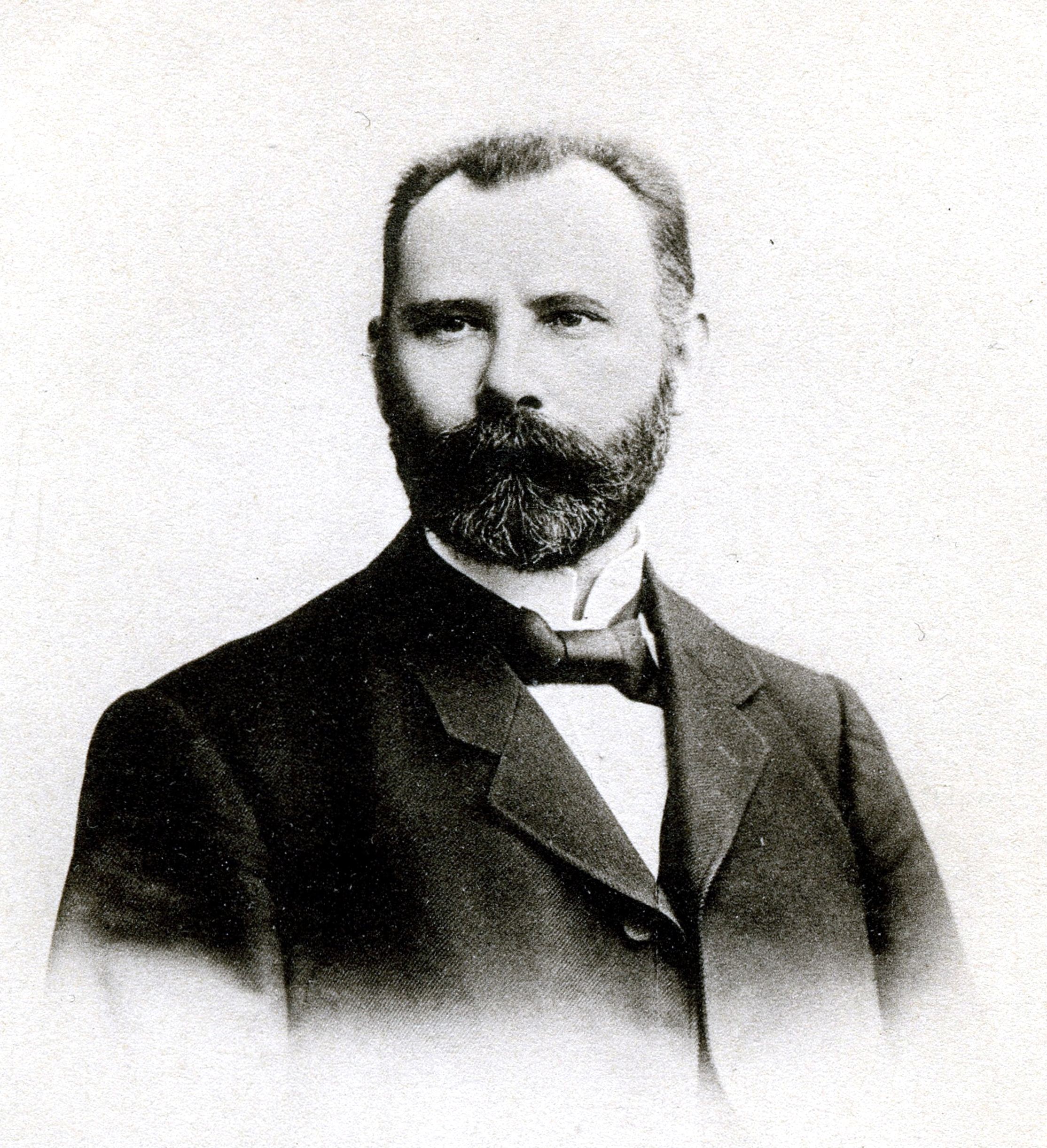
Jānis Čakste in 1906

In 1906 he was elected to the First State Duma of the Russian Empire where he joined the liberal Constitutional Democratic Party. When the latter was dissolved by the Emperor Nicholas II, Čakste was one of its 166 members who signed the so-called Vyborg Manifesto, calling for non-violent resistance to the czarist regime. As a result, he was arrested together with other former Duma members and, after the trial, served three months in prison.

In 1915, after the German invasion of Courland as part of World War I, Čakste moved to Tartu where he co-founded the Central Committee for the Provision of Latvian Refugees and became vice-chairman to Vilis Olavs. In 1915 Čakste organised a demonstration to honour Major General Aleksey Potapov, the commanding officer of the defence of Jelgava, who later became one of the advocates of the formation of the Latvian Rifles.

In late 1916 Čakste departed for the United States on a tour to propagate the idea of Latvian national self-determination, but the trip was cut short in Stockholm with the news of the February Revolution in Russia. In Stockholm he published a pamphlet Die Letten und ihre Latvia: Eine lettische Stimme, where he declared that:

The Latvian people want to protect their nationality, keep their homeland Latvia united, and achieve unlimited opportunities and freedom to lead their national, cultural, and economic development in Latvia.

Following the death of Vilis Olavs in early 1917, Čakste also succeeded him as chairman of the Central Committee for the Provision of Latvian Refugees. After returning to Latvia in spring, the Russian Provisional Government appointed Čakste the provisional commissar of Courland. In addition, he joined the recently formed Latvian Farmers' Union (LZS).

Following the October Coup in late 1917, Čakste began working in the foreign department of the Latvian Provisional National Council, where he prepared addresses to foreign governments protesting against the German occupation of Baltic territories. On 17 November 1918 at the first session of the Latvian People's Council, conceived as a representative body of the new Latvian state, Čakste was elected its chairman in absentia, as he was at his country home at the time. While informed of his election, he did not manage to arrive in time for the declaration of Latvian independence the next day, and the act was proclaimed by the vice-chairman, Gustavs Zemgals.

In 1919 Čakste travelled to the Paris Peace Conference as the leader of the Latvian delegation, establishing relations with foreign diplomats and even attempting to draft a request for reparations from Germany – which did not receive support from the Entente states. On 13 July 1919 he returned to Latvia and resumed his duties as the Chairman of the Latvian People's Council. While undertaking his responsibilities as a statesman, Čakste continued teaching at the law school of the newly founded University of Latvia. In November 1919 he was given the rank of full professor, but in 1924 – the degree Dr. jur. honoris causa.

== First head of state of an independent Latvia ==
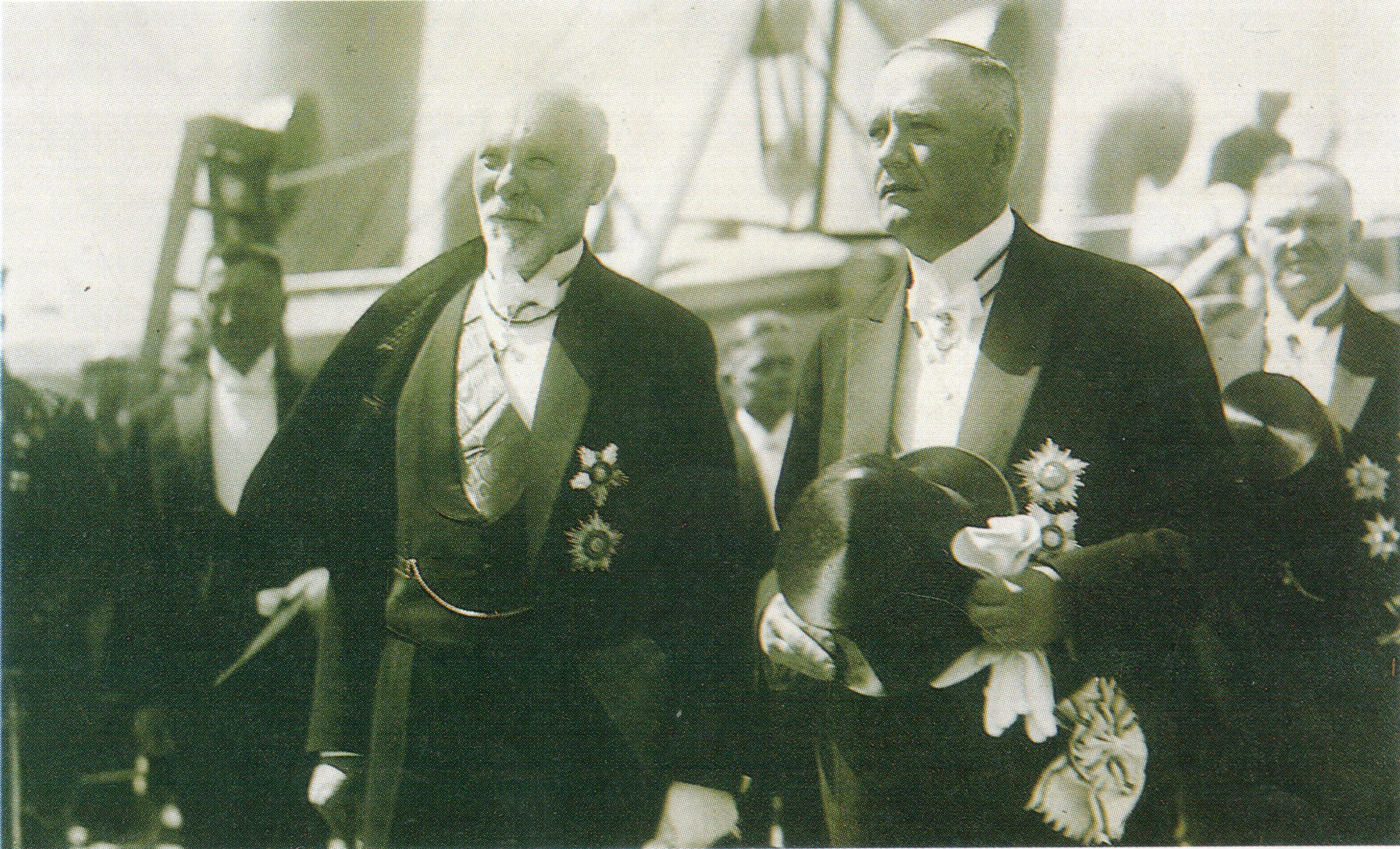
Čakste and President of Finland Lauri Kristian Relander during Relander's 1926 official visit to Latvia. In the background, the Foreign Minister of Finland Eemil Nestor Setälä to the right.

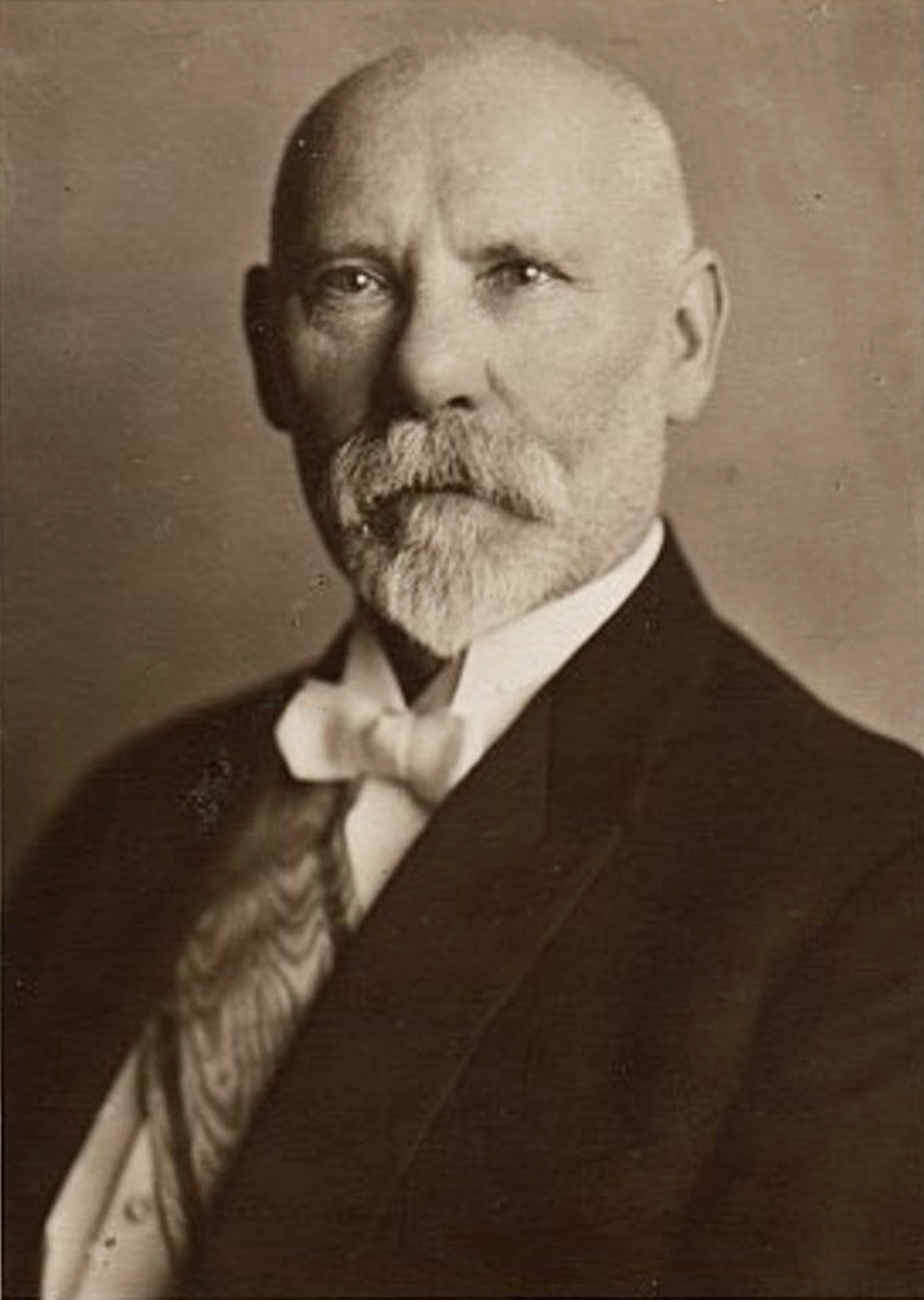
Portrait of Čakste as President

After the first free elections to the Constitutional Assembly of Latvia, Čakste was elected its Speaker on 1 May 1920, thus again assuming the role of the provisional head of the Latvian state. His runner-up in the elections was the renowned poet and LSDSP deputy Rainis. Two years later, at the first session of the first Saeima of Latvia on 7 November 1922 Čakste was elected unopposed as the first President of the Republic of Latvia, with 92 Saeima members voting for his candidacy and 6 against – the highest number of votes ever given to a candidate in a Latvian presidential election. As President, Čakste's responsibilities were largely ceremonial, even though he continued to pay close attention to foreign affairs, especially to the international position of Latvia as a young European state in the world. During his tenure, he promulgated 402 laws, sent three laws back to the Saeima for review, and pardoned 549 people. He caused some controversy in 1926 when he pardoned a prominent writer and a former head of the rival pro-German Latvian puppet government Andrievs Niedra, who was serving a sentence for treason. However, Čakste also insisted on Niedra's leaving the country after the pardon. At the same time, Čakste left the LZS for the Democratic Centre party due to Ulmanis' autocratic leadership style within the party.

For the presidential elections of 1925, Čakste's name was proposed by the Democratic Centre, while Rainis was put forward by the LSDSP and Kārlis Ulmanis – by the LZS. In the first round, the incumbent president finished third, with 29 votes, against 33 for Rainis and 32 for Ulmanis. When the Social Democrats decided to withdraw Rainis's candidacy, much against the latter's will, Čakste won the election with 60 votes.

=== Death ===
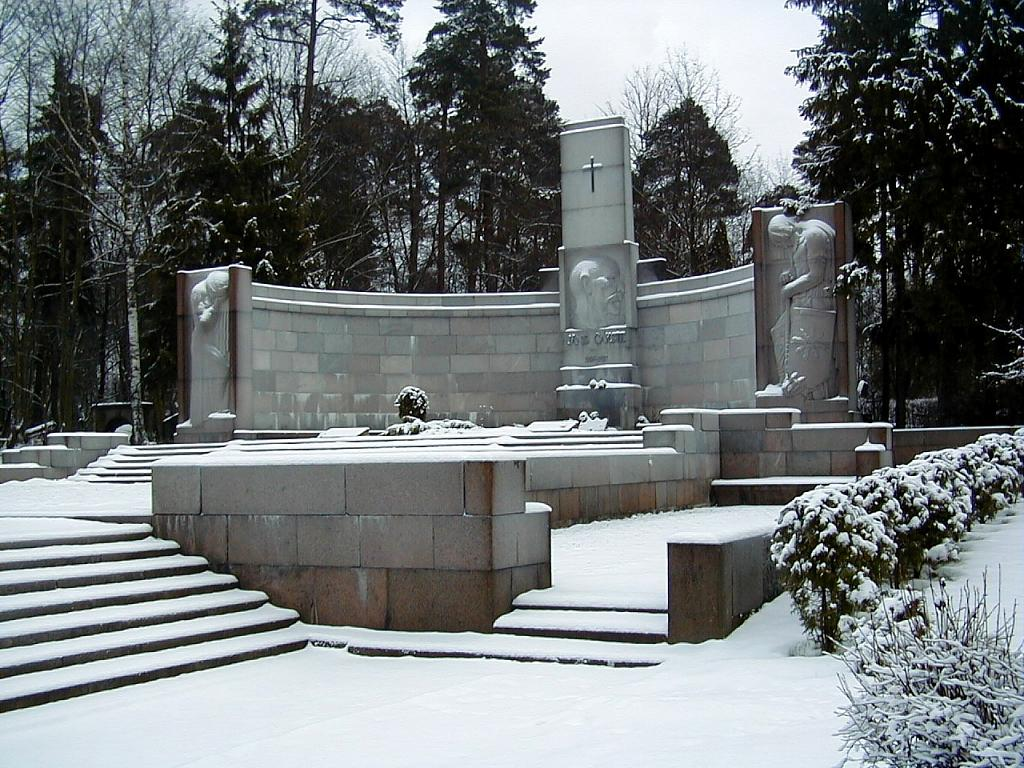
Čakste's Memorial in Forest Cemetery, Riga

Jānis Čakste died in Riga on 14 March 1927 before the expiration of his second three-year term, and was buried at the Forest Cemetery in Riga. He is the only President of Latvia to die in office.

== Family ==
He was married to Justīne Čakste, born Vesere, and they had nine children. His son, Junior Lieutenant Visvaldis Čakste, died from wounds received in the defence of Jelgava in 1915. Another son, Konstantīns Čakste (1901–1945), a lawyer like his father, became one of the leaders of the Latvian national resistance during World War II and the Chairman of the Latvian Central Council, set up in February 1943 as the underground Latvian national government. Konstantīns Čakste was arrested by the Gestapo and died in a forced march from Stutthof concentration camp in February 1945.
