= Alberts Kviesis =

President of Latvia from 1930 to 1936

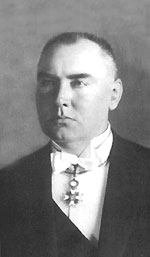
- Kviesis in 1930

3rd President of Latvia
- In office 9 April 1930 – 11 April 1936
- Prime Minister: Hugo Celmiņš; Kārlis Ulmanis; Marģers Skujenieks; Ādolfs Bļodnieks; Kārlis Ulmanis
- Preceded by: Gustavs Zemgals
- Succeeded by: Kārlis Ulmanis^{a}

Minister of the Interior of Latvia
- In office 18 June 1921 – 25 January 1923
- Prime Minister: Zigfrīds Anna Meierovics
- Preceded by: Arveds Bergs
- Succeeded by: Pēteris Berģis

Personal details
- Born: 22 December 1881 Tērvete Parish, Courland Governorate, Russian Empire (now Dobele Municipality, Latvia)
- Died: 9 August 1944 (aged 62) Riga, Generalbezirk Lettland, Reichskommissariat Ostland
- Resting place: Forest Cemetery, Riga
- Party: Latvian Farmers' Union
- Spouse: Elza
- Children: Ēriks
- Occupation: Lawyer
- ^{a} Assumed presidency unconstitutionally, upon the expiration of Kviesis' term .

Alberts Kviesis (22 December 1881 – 9 August 1944) was a Latvian politician who served as third President of Latvia from 1930 to 1936.

== Early life ==
Alberts Kviesis was born in Kalnamuiža (Tērvete) parish (now Dobele Municipality) in the Courland Governorate. Having received his primary education from his parents, he thereafter finished the Jelgava Gymnasium and from 1902 studied law at the Tartu University, from where he graduated in 1907. After his studies, he worked as a lawyer in Jelgava. He took an active part in the work of Latvian national societies, having served as an acting chair of the Jelgava Latvian Society and a member of the Latvian commission of the Jelgava Red Cross.

== Political career ==
On 25 April 1917, in Tartu, he participated in the Kurzeme local assembly and was elected to the Provisional Land Council of Kurzeme. In May 1917, he was elected by the Congress of Latvian Lawyers to the Bureau of Latvian Lawyers of Tartu. On 17 November 1918 Kviesis was among the delegates of the Tautas padome (People’s Council) of Latvia and, as a lawyer, was elected the vice-chair of the Council for juridical affairs. During the first years of Latvian independence, Kviesis actively participated in the development of the Latvian legal and court system. In July 1919 he was appointed a member of the Court Chamber, becoming its chairman from March 1923. Concurrently, from 1921 to 1923 he served as the Minister for the Interior in the cabinet of Zigfrīds Anna Meierovics. He was one of the most active members of the Latvian Farmers' Union, being elected to the Constitutional Assembly and first three Saeimas. From 1926 he served as the Vice-Speaker of the Latvian parliament.

After his unsuccessful attempt during the Latvian presidential elections in 1927, Kviesis ran again in 1930 after Gustavs Zemgals refused to be a candidate for a second term. He was elected after eleven rounds of voting on 9 April 1930, with a 55-vote majority of the Saeima members. During his term as President, he never proposed a single law himself, never vetoed a single law passed by Saeima, and never exercised his right to call an extraordinary cabinet meeting. On 11 April 1933 he was reelected by Saeima for his second term.

On 15 May 1934, Prime Minister Kārlis Ulmanis organized a coup d’etat, of which the President, his fellow party member, had no prior knowledge. As the coup was under way, Kvesis’s communications in the Riga Castle were cut off, but he never made any attempt, as the army’s commander-in-chief, to prevent or resist the coup. After Ulmanis had informed the President at 1 a.m. on 16 May that the Saeima had been dissolved and the Constitution suspended, Kvesis made no protest and continued to exercise his duties until the expiration of his term, albeit without any real power. He dutifully signed all laws passed by Ulmanis’ authoritarian government, the only remarkable event of his second term being the solemn opening of the Freedom Monument in Riga on 18 November 1935.

On 19 March 1936, Kviesis promulgated a law which stipulated that Ulmanis would become president upon the expiration of Kvesis' term, thus unconstitutionally combining the two offices. The law took effect when Kvesis left office on 11 April 1936, after which he returned to his law practice.

As the Soviet army occupied Latvia in 1940, Kviesis was prohibited to practice law and put under house arrest. He evaded mass deportations of June 1941, having hid with his family at some forest warden’s home. During the German occupation, he returned to his law practice, working for the legal consultant at the Law General Directorate of the pro-German Latvian Self-Government which was completely under the German control. From 1943 to 1944 he served as the director for the legal affairs of the Latvian Self-Government.

In August 1944, as he boarded a German ship to leave with the retreating German army, he died of a heart attack while the ship was still at the harbor. He is buried at the Forest Cemetery in Riga.
