= Kārlis Ulmanis =

Prime minister of Latvia, agronomist

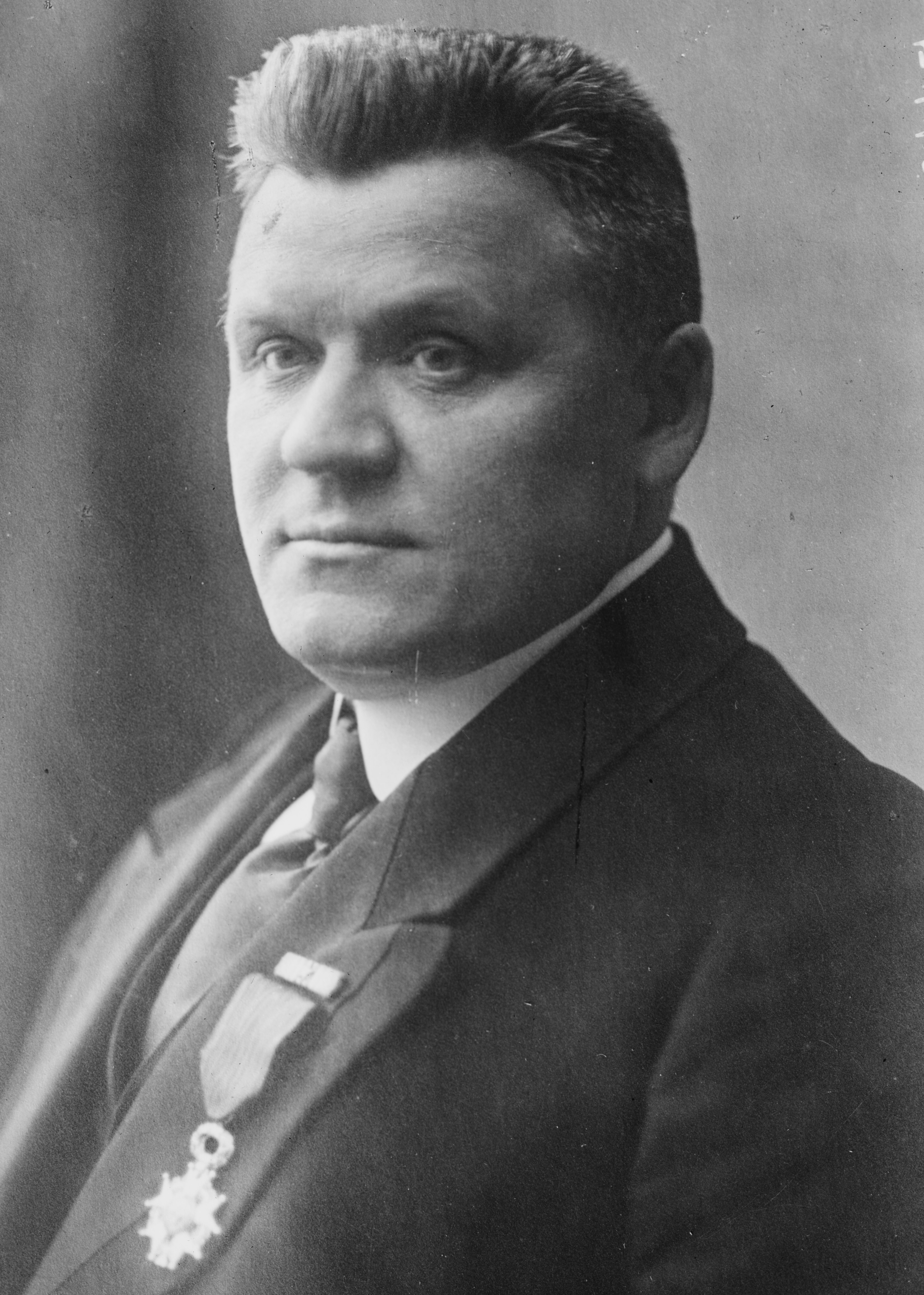

4th President of Latvia*
- In office 11 April 1936 – 21 July 1940
- Prime Minister: Himself; Augusts Kirhenšteins (under Soviet occupation)
- Vice President: Jānis Balodis
- Preceded by: Alberts Kviesis
- Succeeded by: Augusts Kirhenšteins; Acting, as Prime minister under Soviet occupation Anatolijs Gorbunovs; As the head of state after the restoration of Latvian independence Guntis Ulmanis As 5th President of Latvia

1st Prime Minister of Latvia
- In office 19 November 1918 – 18 June 1921
- President: Jānis Čakste
- Preceded by: Position established
- Succeeded by: Zigfrīds Anna Meierovics
- In office 24 December 1925 – 6 May 1926
- President: Jānis Čakste
- Preceded by: Hugo Celmiņš
- Succeeded by: Arturs Alberings
- In office 27 March 1931 – 5 December 1931
- President: Alberts Kviesis
- Preceded by: Hugo Celmiņš
- Succeeded by: Marģers Skujenieks
- In office 17 March 1934 – 17 June 1940
- President: Alberts Kviesis; Himself
- Preceded by: Ādolfs Bļodnieks
- Succeeded by: Augusts Kirhenšteins under Soviet occupation

Foreign Minister of Latvia
- In office 4 May 1926 – 17 December 1926
- Prime Minister: Arturs Alberings
- Preceded by: Hermanis Albats (Acting)
- Succeeded by: Felikss Cielēns
- In office 24 March 1931 – 4 December 1931
- Prime Minister: Himself
- Preceded by: Hugo Celmiņš
- Succeeded by: Kārlis Zariņš
- In office 17 March 1934 – 17 April 1936
- Prime Minister: Himself
- Preceded by: Voldemārs Salnais
- Succeeded by: Vilhelms Munters

Personal details
- Born: Kārlis Augusts Vilhelms Ulmanis; 4 September 1877 Bērze, Courland Governorate, Russian Empire
- Died: 20 September 1942 (aged 65) Krasnovodsk, Turkmen SSR, Soviet Union
- Resting place: Türkmenbaşy, Turkmenistan
- Party: Latvian Farmers' Union (1917–1934)
- Education: University of Nebraska
- *Self-proclaimed

Kārlis Augusts Vilhelms Ulmanis (Latvian: [ˈkaːrlis ˈɑuɡusts ˈvilxɛlms ˈuɫmɑnis]; 4 September 1877 – 20 September 1942) was a Latvian politician and dictator. He was one of the most prominent Latvian politicians of pre-World War II Latvia during the Interwar period of independence from November 1918 to June 1940 and served as the country's first prime minister.

He served four times as prime minister, the last time as the head of an authoritarian regime, during which he subsequently also adopted the title of President of Latvia. The legacy of his dictatorship continues to divide public opinion in Latvia today.

== Early life ==
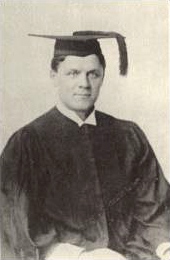
Kārlis Ulmanis as a student at the University of Nebraska

Born in a prosperous farming family, Ulmanis studied agriculture at the Swiss Federal Institute of Technology Zurich and at Leipzig University. He then worked in Latvia as a writer, lecturer, and manager in agricultural positions. He was politically active during the 1905 Revolution, was briefly imprisoned in Pskov, and subsequently fled Latvia to avoid incarceration by the Russian authorities. During this period of exile, he studied at the University of Nebraska in the United States as Karl August Ulmann, earning a Bachelor of Science degree in agriculture. After working briefly at that university as a lecturer, Ulmanis moved to Houston, Texas. The dairy business he had bought there ran into financial difficulties.

Ulmanis returned to Latvia from American exile in 1913, after being informed that it was now safe for political exiles to return due to the declaration of a general amnesty by Nicholas II of Russia. This safety was short-lived as World War I broke out one year later and Courland Governorate was partially occupied by Germany in 1915.

== Political career in independent Latvia ==
In the last stages of World War I, he founded the Latvian Farmers' Union, one of the two most prominent political parties in Latvia at that time. Ulmanis was one of the principal founders of the People's Council, which proclaimed Latvia's independence on 18 November 1918, with Ulmanis as the Prime Minister of the first Provisional government of Latvia. After the Latvian War of Independence of 1919–1920, a constitutional convention established Latvia as a parliamentary democracy in 1920. Ulmanis served as Prime Minister on three occasions from 1918 to 1931.

== Coup of 15 May 1934 ==
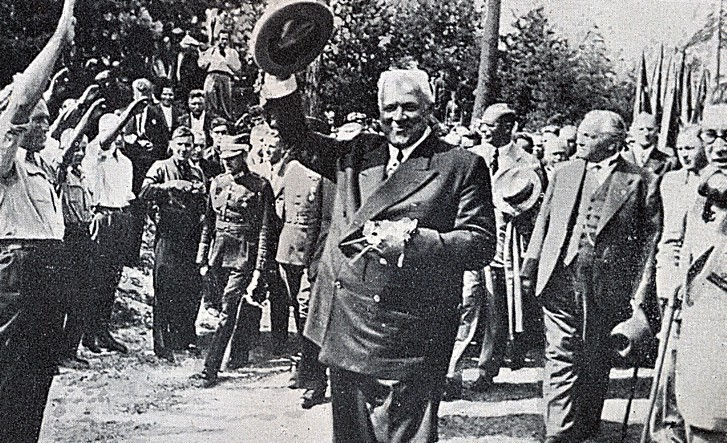
Ulmanis in 1934

Ulmanis formed a fourth government in March 1934. On the night of 15–16 May 1934, with the support of Minister of War Jānis Balodis, Ulmanis proclaimed a state of war and dissolved all political parties and the Saeima (parliament). The bloodless coup was carried out by national guard (Aizsargi) and army units loyal to Ulmanis. They moved against key government offices, communications and transportation facilities. Many elected officials and politicians (almost exclusively Social Democrats, as well as figures from the extreme right and left) were detained, as were any military officers who resisted the self-coup. Some 2,000 Social Democrats were initially detained by the authorities, including most of the Social Democratic members of the disbanded Saeima, as were members of various right-wing radical organizations, such as Pērkonkrusts.

In all, 369 Social Democrats, 95 members of Pērkonkrusts, pro-Nazi activists from the Baltic German community, and a handful of politicians from other parties were interned in a prison camp established in the Karosta district of Liepāja. After several Social Democrats, such as Bruno Kalniņš, had been cleared of weapons charges by the courts, most of those imprisoned began to be released over time. Those convicted by the courts of treasonous acts, such as the leader of Pērkonkrusts Gustavs Celmiņš, remained behind bars for the duration of their sentences, three years in the case of Celmiņš.

For the next four years, Ulmanis ruled by decree, without a parliament. A decree vested the Saeima's functions in the cabinet until a new constitution could be drafted. Although the incumbent State President Alberts Kviesis did not support the coup, he remained in office and collaborated with Ulmanis.

On 19 March 1936 Ulmanis' cabinet drafted a law that provided for Ulmanis to become State President as well as Prime Minister upon the expiration of Kviesis' term. This clearly violated the Constitution, which stipulated that the chairman of the Saeima would become acting president pending new elections. However, no one dared object. When Kviesis left office on 11 April 1936, Ulmanis combined the offices of president and prime minister.

== Authoritarian regime ==
The Ulmanis regime was unique among other European dictatorships of the interwar period. Ulmanis did not create a ruling party, rubber-stamp parliament or a new ideology. It was a nonpartisan, personal, and paternalistic dictatorship in which Ulmanis—who called himself "the leader of the people"—claimed to do what he thought was best for Latvians. All political life was proscribed, while culture and economy were eventually organized into a type of corporate statism made popular during those years by Mussolini. Chambers of Professions were created, similar to Chambers of Corporations in other dictatorships.

All political parties, including Ulmanis' own Farmers' Union, were outlawed. Part of the Latvian Constitution and civil liberties were suspended. All newspapers owned by political parties or organizations were closed and all publications were subjected to censorship and government oversight by the Ministry of Public Affairs led by Alfrēds Bērziņš. The army and the Aizsargi paramilitary were lavished with privileges.

Ulmanis is often believed to have been a popular leader especially among farmers and ethnic Latvians. This is debatable. His party had never won more than 17 percent of the vote in any election and had seen its support steadily decline in the years since the 1922 constitutional convention. In the 1931 election, the Farmers' Union only won 12.2 percent of the vote, an all-time low. Some historians believe that one of the chief motives for the coup was his fear of losing even more votes in the upcoming elections. From the time of his coup until his demise, for obvious reasons, no reliable voting or popularity statistics were available.

=== Ideology ===
Ulmanis was a Latvian nationalist, who espoused the slogan "Latvia for Latvians" which meant that Latvia was to be a Latvian nation state, not a multinational state with traditional Baltic German elites and Jewish entrepreneurial class. At the same time, the slogan "Latvia's sun shines equally over everyone" was used and no ethnic group was actively targeted. A limited number of German, Jewish and other minority press and organizations continued to exist as far as the limitations of authoritarian dictatorship permitted. Yiddish newspapers were hit particularly hard. In practice only the religious party Agudat Israel's newspaper Haint was not forbidden, while popular publications Dos Folk, Frimorgn, Riger Tog, and Naier Fraitik were closed. The official 1936 chamber of commerce list of newspapers and magazines does not list a single Yiddish, Hebrew or Jewish publication.

Latvianisation policies were followed in the area of education, cutting and removing subsidies for minority education. During Ulmanis' rule, education was strongly emphasized and literacy rates in Latvia reached high levels. Especially in eastern Latvia Latgale region however, education was actively used as a tool of assimilation of minorities. Many new schools were built, but they were Latvian schools and minority children were thus assimilated.

=== Economy ===
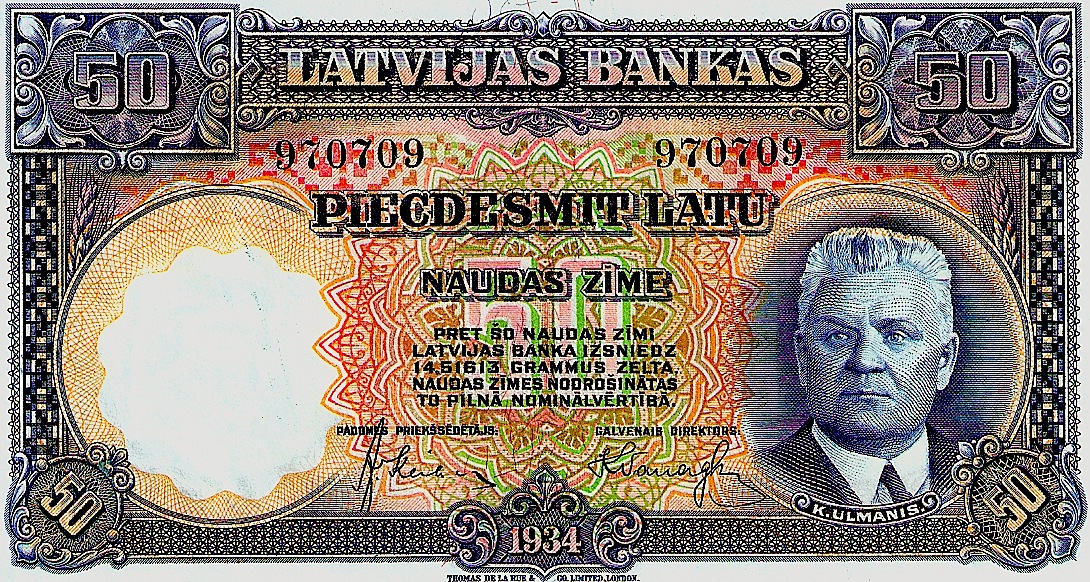
50 lati banknote with the portrait of Ulmanis

Economic historians are divided as whether Latvia experienced economic stagnation or prosperity during the Ulmanis regime. The state assumed a larger role in the economy and state capitalism was introduced by purchasing and uniting smaller competing private companies into larger state enterprises. This process was controlled by Latvijas Kredītbanka, a state bank established in 1935. Many large-scale building projects were undertaken—new schools, administrative buildings, Ķegums Hydroelectric Power Station. Due to an application of the economics of comparative advantage, the United Kingdom and Germany became Latvia's major trade partners, while trade with the USSR was reduced. The economy, especially the agriculture and manufacturing sectors, was micromanaged to an extreme degree. Ulmanis nationalized many industries. This resulted in rapid economic growth, during which Latvia attained a very high standard of living. At a time when most of the world's economy was still suffering from the effects of the Great Depression, Latvia could point to increases in both gross national product (GNP) and in exports of Latvian goods overseas. This, however, came at the cost of liberty and civil rights.

The policy of Ulmanis, even before his accession to power, was openly directed toward eliminating the minority groups from economic life and of giving Latvians of Latvian ethnicity access to all positions in the national economy. This was sometimes referred to as "Lettization". According to some estimates, about 90% of the banks and credit establishments in Latvia were state-owned or under Latvian management in 1939, against 20% in 1933. Alfrēds Birznieks, the minister of agriculture, in a speech delivered in Ventspils on 26 January 1936, said:

Latvian people are the only masters of this country; Latvians will themselves promulgate the laws and judge for themselves what justice is.

As a result, the economic and cultural influence of minorities—Germans, Jews, Russians, Poles—declined.

Latvia's first full-length sound movie Fishermans' Son (1939) was a tale of a young fisherman who tries to free other local fishermen from the power of a middleman and shows them that the future lies in cooperative work. The movie was based on a widely popular novel written by Vilis Lācis who in 1940 became the Prime Minister of the Soviet-occupied Latvian SSR.

== Later life and death ==
On 23 August 1939 Adolf Hitler's Germany and Joseph Stalin's USSR signed a non-aggression agreement, known as the Molotov–Ribbentrop Pact, which contained a secret addendum (revealed only in 1945), dividing Eastern Europe into spheres of influence. Latvia was thereby assigned to the Soviet sphere. Following a Soviet ultimatum in October 1939, Ulmanis signed the Soviet–Latvian Mutual Assistance Treaty and allowed the formation of Soviet military bases in Latvia. On 17 June 1940 Latvia was completely occupied by the Soviet Union. Rather than risk an unwinnable war, Ulmanis gave a nationwide radio address ordering no resistance to the Red Army, saying "I will remain in my place and you remain in yours".

For the next month, Ulmanis cooperated with the Soviets. He resigned as prime minister three days after the coup, and appointed a left-wing government headed by Augusts Kirhenšteins—which, in truth, had been chosen by the Soviet embassy. Soviet-controlled elections for a "People's Saeima" were held on 14–15 July, in which voters were presented with a single list from a Communist-dominated alliance. The new "People's Saeima" met on 21 July with only one order of business—a resolution proclaiming Latvia a Soviet republic and seeking admission to the Soviet Union, which was carried unanimously. This move violated the Latvian Constitution, which stipulated that a major change to the basic constitutional order could only be enacted after two-thirds of the electorate approved it via a plebiscite. Since Latvia seceded from the Soviet Union in 1990, it has argued on that basis that the resolution seeking admission to the Soviet Union was illegal. It further maintains that the People's Saeima was elected in accordance with an illegal and unconstitutional election law, rendering all of its acts void.

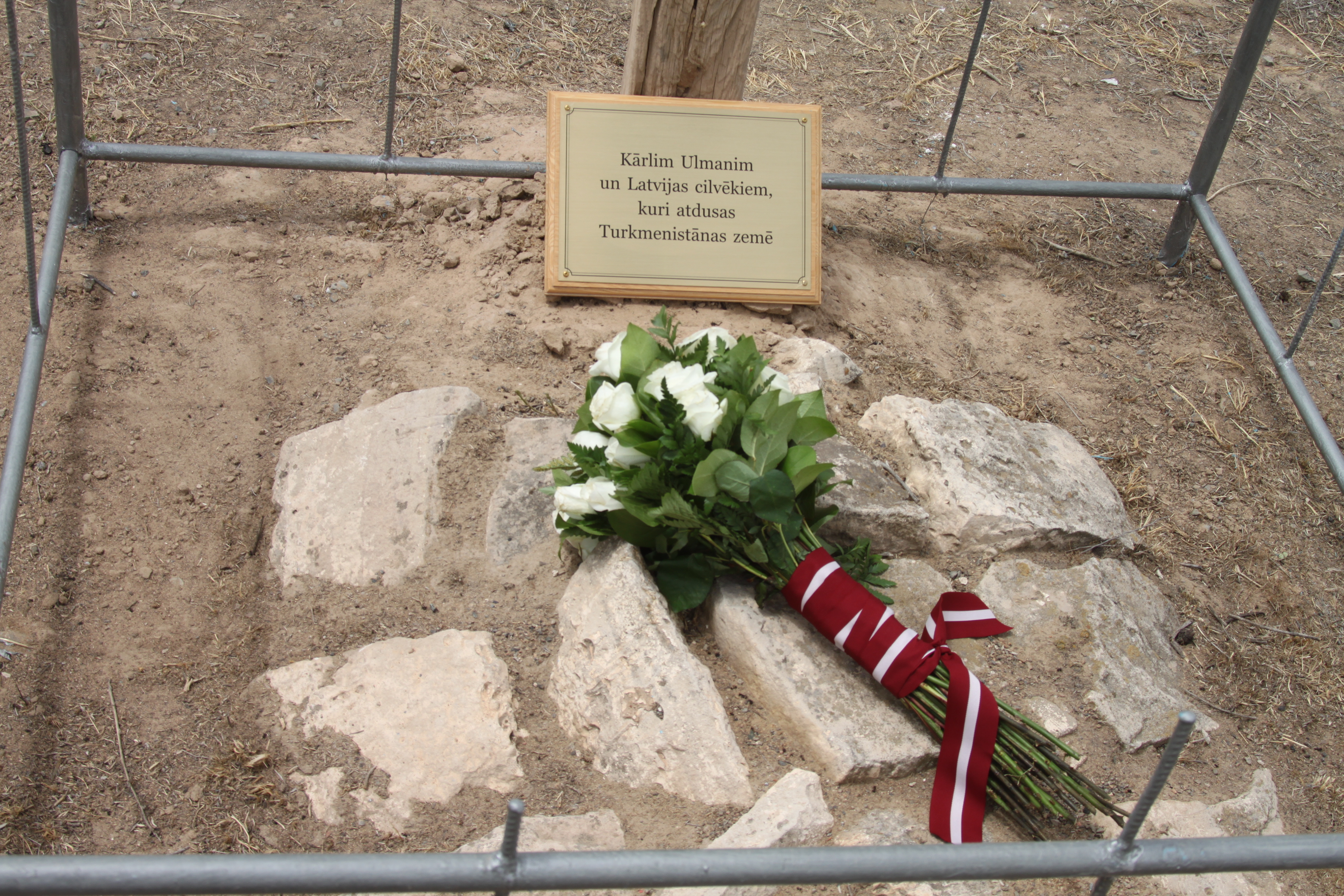
A possible grave of Kārlis Ulmanis at Türkmenbaşy, Turkmenistan with a commemorative plaque "to Kārlis Ulmanis and all the people of Latvia resting in the land of Turkmenistan"

Also on 21 July, Ulmanis was forced to resign as president; Kirhenšteins took over the presidency and oversaw the final stages of integrating Latvia into the Soviet Union. Ulmanis asked the Soviet government for a pension and permission to emigrate to Switzerland. Instead, he was arrested and sent to Stavropol in Russian SFSR, where he worked in his original profession as an agronomist for a year. After the start of Operation Barbarossa, he was imprisoned in July 1941. A year later, as German armies were closing in on Stavropol, he and other inmates were evacuated to prison in Krasnovodsk, Turkmen SSR (present-day Türkmenbaşy in Turkmenistan). On the way there, he contracted dysentery and soon died on 20 September 1942. For a long time, his burial place was unknown. In 2011 Georgian media reported that Ulmanis may be buried in Gori City Cemetery, according to a former gravedigger who claimed that he was convoyed by KGB officers and had to dig the grave for Ulmanis. However, in 2017, Ulmanis' grand-nephew, Guntis Ulmanis, announced that the search had been called off as it was apparent the site would be impossible to find.

== Later assessments ==
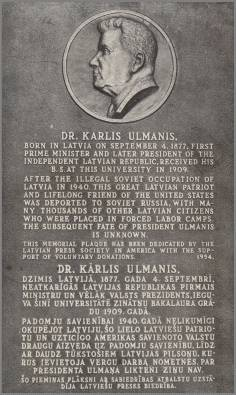
Commemorative plaque at the University of Nebraska from 1954

Kārlis Ulmanis's legacy for Latvia and Latvians is a complex one. In the postwar Latvian SSR the Soviet régime labelled Ulmanis a fascist, indistinguishable from the Nazis, accusing him of corruption and of bloody repressions against Latvian workers.

Among the postwar Latvian émigrés of Latvian cultural background in exile, Ulmanis was idealized by many of those who viewed his 6-year authoritarian rule as a Golden Age of the Latvian nation. Some traditions created by Ulmanis, such as the so-called Friendly invitation, a charitable donations to one's former school, continued to be upheld.

In independent Latvia today, Ulmanis remains a popular, if also controversial figure. Many Latvians view him as a symbol of Latvia's independence prior to World War II Latvia, and historians are generally in agreement about his positive early role as prime minister during the country's formative years. With regard to the authoritarian period, opinions diverge, however. On the one hand, it is possible to credit Ulmanis for the rise of ethnic Latvians' economic prosperity during the 1930s, and stress that under his rule there was not the same level of militarism or mass political oppression that characterized other dictatorships of the day. On the other hand, historians such as Ulmanis' biographer Edgars Dunsdorfs are of the view that someone who disbanded Parliament and adopted authoritarian rule cannot be regarded as a positive figure, even if that rule was in some terms a prosperous one.

One sign that Ulmanis was still very popular in Latvia during the first years of regained independence was the election of his grand-nephew Guntis Ulmanis as President of Latvia in 1993.

One of the major traffic routes in Riga, the capital of Latvia, is named after him (Kārļa Ulmaņa gatve, previously named after Ernst Thälmann). In 2003, a monument of Ulmanis was unveiled in a park in Riga center.

== Personal life and family ==
Not much is known about the personal life of Ulmanis. It is known that he never married and there are no records of him dating anyone. When once asked about why he was not married or did not have a significant other, his response was "I am married to Latvia, and that is enough for me." During his lifetime, there were rumors over his sexuality, with statements that he was homosexual. The rumors were fueled by Ulmanis' close relationships with two of his male employees, as well as Ulmanis himself not giving any information about his personal life. He did not have any offspring, although his brother did, with Ulmanis' grandnephew Guntis Ulmanis later becoming the president of Latvia.

== See also ==
- Latvian War of Independence
- Freikorps in the Baltic
- Latvian Provisional Government
- Soviet occupation of Latvia in 1940
- European interwar dictatorships

Political offices
Preceded by Position established	Prime Minister of Latvia; 1918-1921	Succeeded by Zigfrīds Anna Meierovics
Preceded by Hugo Celmiņš	Prime Minister of Latvia; 1925-1926	Succeeded by Arturs Alberings
Preceded by Hugo Celmiņš	Prime Minister of Latvia; 1931	Succeeded by Marģers Skujenieks
Preceded by Ādolfs Bļodnieks	Prime Minister of Latvia; 1934-1940	Succeeded by Augusts Kirhenšteins under Soviet occupation
Preceded by Alberts Kviesis	President of Latvia (interim, self-appointed) (Note: Upon the expiration of Kviesis's term, Prime minister Kārlis Ulmanis illegally merged the Presidency and the Premiership, holding both offices himself. After the Soviet occupation Prime Minister Augusts Kirhenšteins was the illegitimate Acting President from 21 July to 25 August 1940); 1936-1940	Succeeded by Anatolijs Gorbunovs (interim)
