= Zigfrīds Anna Meierovics =

Prime Minister of Latvia (1887–1925)

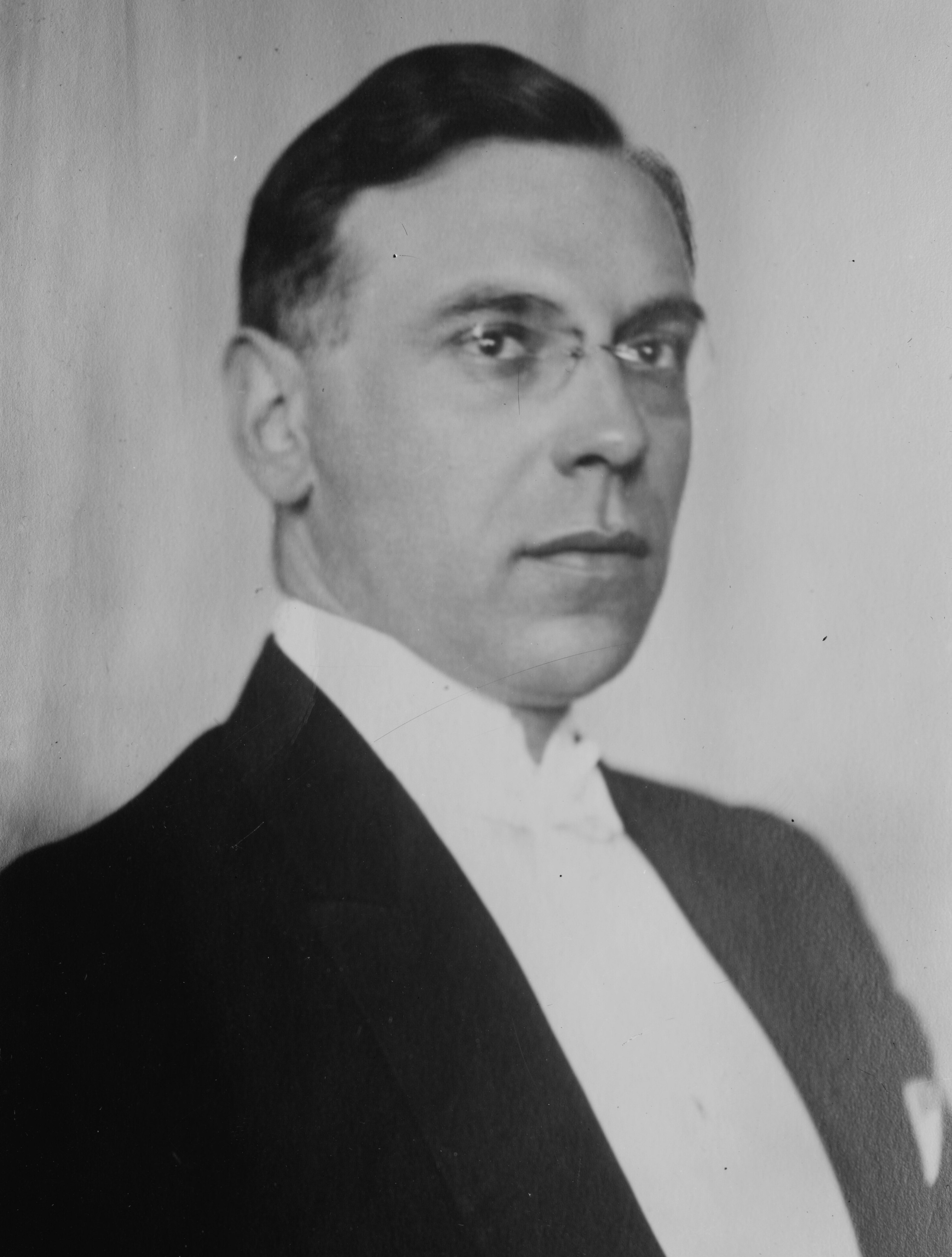

2nd Prime Minister of Latvia
- In office 19 June 1921 – 26 January 1923
- President: Jānis Čakste
- Preceded by: Kārlis Ulmanis
- Succeeded by: Jānis Pauļuks
- In office 28 June 1923 – 26 January 1924
- President: Jānis Čakste
- Preceded by: Jānis Pauļuks
- Succeeded by: Voldemārs Zāmuēls

Foreign Minister of Latvia
- In office 18 November 1918 – 26 January 1924
- Prime Minister: Kārlis Ulmanis; Jānis Pauļuks; Himself
- Preceded by: Position established
- Succeeded by: Ludvigs Sēja
- In office 18 December 1924 – 22 August 1925
- Prime Minister: Hugo Celmiņš
- Preceded by: Ludvigs Sēja
- Succeeded by: Hugo Celmiņš

Personal details
- Born: 5 February 1887 Durbe, Latvia (part of the Russian Empire)
- Died: 22 August 1925 (aged 38) Sēme parish, Latvia
- Resting place: Riga Forest cemetery
- Party: Latvian Farmers' Union
- Spouse: Anna Meierovics (née Fielhold)
- Children: Helmuts, Ruta, Gunars
- Profession: Diplomat, Politician

Zigfrīds Anna Meierovics (5 February [O.S. 24 January] 1887, Durbe – 22 August 1925, near Tukums) was a Latvian politician and diplomat who served as the first Foreign Minister of Latvia from its independence until 1924 and again from December of the same year until his death. He also served two terms as the Prime Minister of Latvia from June, 1921 to January, 1923 and from June 1923 to January, 1924. He was one of the founders of the Latvian Farmers' Union, one of Latvia's oldest political parties.

== Early life ==
Meierovics was born into the family of a Jewish doctor and his Latvian wife Anna, who died in childbirth. His father became mentally ill and therefore young Meierovics grew up with his uncle's family in Sabile. He studied at the Riga Polytechnicum.

== Career ==
After 1911 Meierovics belonged to various Latvian organizations, notably the Riga Latvian Society. During World War I he worked in the Latvian Refugee Committee and the organizing committee of the Latvian Riflemen units. After the February Revolution he moved to Riga to work as a professional politician. In September 1917, he attended the Congress of the Peoples of Russia.

On 23 October, and again on 11 November 1918, as the representative of Latvian Provisional National Council, he received written confirmation that the United Kingdom acknowledged the de facto statehood of Latvia and National Council as its government. Meierovics became the first Minister of Foreign Affairs of Latvia on 19 November 1918, a day after the Republic of Latvia was proclaimed. He was a member of the Latvian Peoples Council, the Constitutional Assembly of Latvia and the 1st Saeima.

== Honours and awards ==
On 17 March 1922, Meierovics was awarded the Grand Cross of the Polish Order of Polonia Restituta. On 30 May 1922, he received the Grand Cross of the Order of St. Sylvester, 1st Class (Holy See). He was also awarded the Order of the Three Stars, First Class (Latvia), Order of the White Rose (Finland) and Croix de Guerre (France)

Other awards included the Order of Lāčplēsis, 3rd class (Latvia) and the Austro-Hungarian Order of the Red Cross.

== Private life ==
On 28 September 1910 Meierovics married Anna Fielhold, with whom he had three children, two boys and a girl; Helmuts (1914–1998), Ruta (1916-1999, surname Kose in marriage) and Gunars (1920–2007). On 18 February 1924 they officially divorced, and on 7 June of the same year he married Kristīne Bakmane.

His son Gunars was a candidate for President of Latvia in 1993. It was the first presidential election after the end of the Soviet occupation. The 5th Saeima failed to elect Meierovics, instead choosing Guntis Ulmanis, the great-nephew of Kārlis Ulmanis.

== Death ==
Zigfrīds Anna Meierovics died in a car accident on 22 August 1925 at the age of 38. The car with the minister, his chauffeur, his ex-wife and his children from the first marriage, departed from Tukums where his first wife's mansion was located, heading for the seaside. About 18 km from Tukums the car accidentally drove off the road and overturned. While other passengers suffered only minor bruises, the minister was apparently crushed by the vehicle, resulting in a broken neck and severed spinal cord. The chauffeur had to run about 2 km to the nearest living place, but before the doctor arrived, the minister died on the scene. His widow shot herself on 2 December 1925 and is buried next to him.

Political offices
Preceded by Kārlis Ulmanis	Prime Minister of Latvia; 19 June 1921 – 26 January 1923	Succeeded by Jānis Pauļuks
Preceded by Jānis Pauļuks	Prime Minister of Latvia; 28 June 1923 – 26 January 1924	Succeeded by Voldemārs Zāmuēls
