= Arturs Alberings =

Latvian politician (1876–1934)

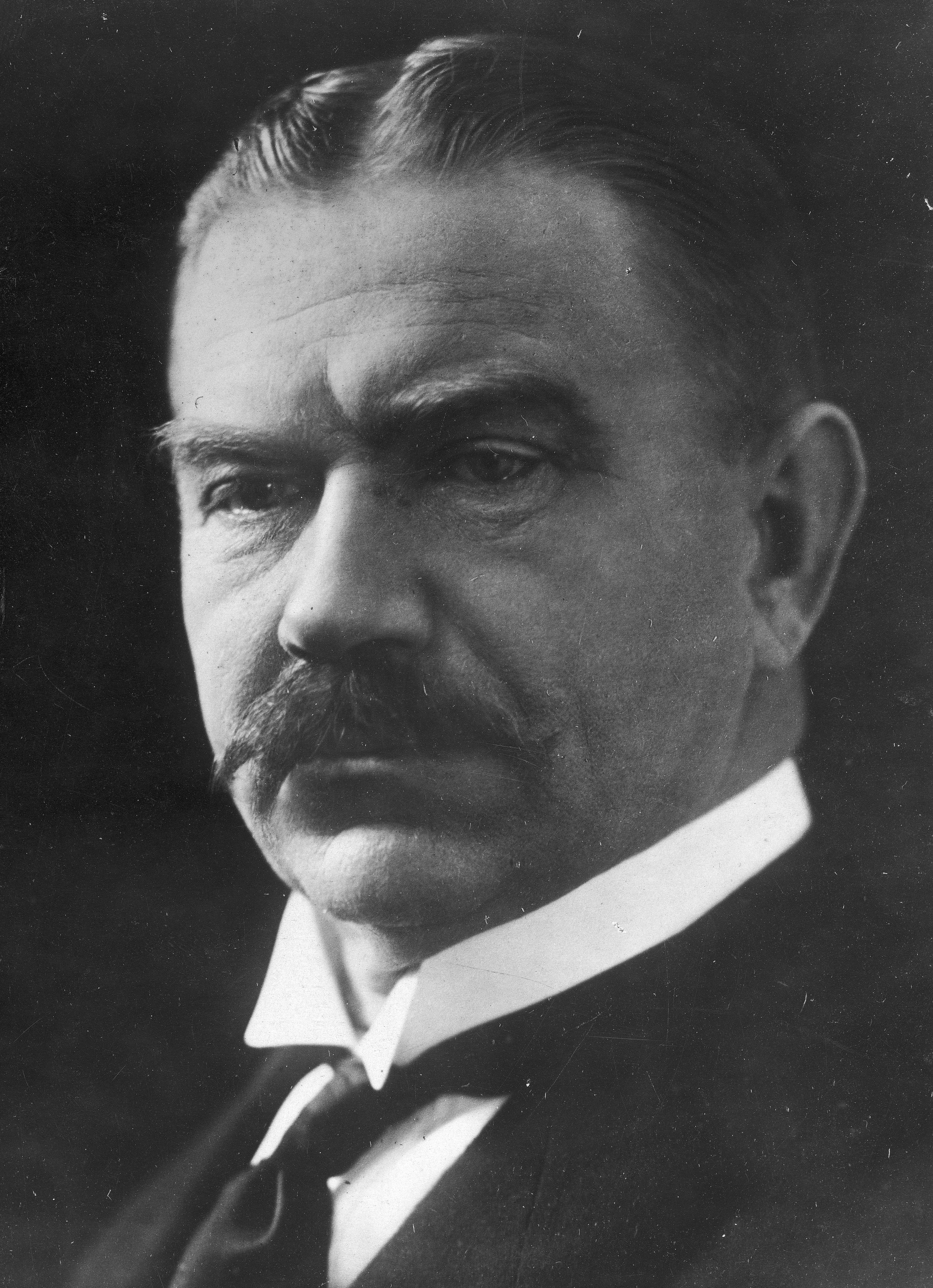

6th Prime Minister of Latvia
- In office 7 May 1926 – 18 December 1926
- President: Jānis Čakste
- Preceded by: Kārlis Ulmanis
- Succeeded by: Marģers Skujenieks

8th Minister of Finance
- In office 10 September 1926 – 18 December 1926
- President: Jānis Čakste
- Prime Minister: Himself
- Preceded by: Jānis Blumbergs
- Succeeded by: Voldemārs Bastjānis

11th Minister of Agriculture
- In office 1 December 1928 – 5 March 1930
- Prime Minister: Hugo Celmiņš
- Preceded by: Vilis Gulbis
- Succeeded by: Vilis Gulbis
- In office 27 March 1931 – 5 December 1931
- Prime Minister: Kārlis Ulmanis
- Preceded by: Vilis Gulbis
- Succeeded by: Vilis Gulbis

Personal details
- Born: 8 January 1877 Rūjiena Parish, Kreis Wolmar, Livonia, Russian Empire
- Died: 26 June 1934 (aged 57) Riga, Latvia
- Party: Latvian Farmers' Union
- Spouse: Magda Kermann Albering
- Awards: Order of the Three Stars; Order of the White Rose

Arturs Alberings (8 January 1876 – 26 April 1934) was the 6th Prime Minister of Latvia. He held office from 7 May 1926 to 18 December 1926.

== Personal life ==
Alberings was born on 8 January 1876 to a family of farmers in Rūjiena, Kreis Wolmar, in the Governorate of Livonia. His father was Virķēni "Klāvās. After graduating from Vilkene Primary School and Kharkiv Agricultural High School, he studied agronomy in Norway, and also improved his knowledge of fish farming in Germany.

In Russia, he worked as the director of the School of Agriculture and Fish Farming, as well as the manager of manors. After returning to Latvia, he started leading courses at the Riga Central Agricultural Association, and he founded and managed animal monitoring associations in the Rūjiena and Valmiera areas.

After the February Revolution in 1917, Alberings began to be involved in politics. In August, 1918, he was elected a member of the Vidzeme Land Council. In November, as a representative of the Latvian Farmers Union, he became a member of the People's Council of Latvia.

== Political career ==
Alberings was elected to the Constitutional Assembly in 1922 and served on commissions of inquiry into agricultural affairs and treason. In Parliament, its first chairman was Frīdriha Vesmaņa. The 2nd member of the 2nd Saeima was Pauls Kalniņš. In Parliament, its first chairman was Frīdriha Vesmaņa.

Alberings ran and was elected in the 3rd Saeima elections. He was the Minister of Agriculture in the cabinet of Hugo Celmiņš and the government of Kārlis Ulmanis.

In May 1926, after the government headed by Ulmanis resigned due to the unaccepted budget, his cabinet was formed. In September, Alberings also took over the duties of the Minister of Finance due to the resignation of the former Minister Jānis Blumbers.

In December, the Saeima asked Prime Minister Alberings why no new Minister of Finance had been found, to which he replied that he had assumed the post of Minister of Finance instead of performing his duties. The majority of Parliament found this explanation unsatisfactory and the government resigned.

Since the autumn semester of 1926, he has been an honorary philister of the student association "Fraternitas Rusticana". Alberings was awarded the Order of the Three Stars 2nd Class, the Order of the White Rose of Finland etc.

== Death ==
Artur Alberings died in Riga on 26 April 1934, from pneumonia.

Political offices
Preceded by Kārlis Ulmanis	Prime Minister of Latvia; 7 May 1926 – 18 December 1926	Succeeded by Marģers Skujenieks
Preceded by Jānis Blumbergs	Minister of Finance; 10 September 1926 – 18 December 1926	Succeeded by Voldemārs Bastjānis
Preceded by Vilis Gulbis	Minister of Agriculture; 1 December 1928 – 5 March 1930; 27 March 1931 – 5 December 1931	Succeeded by Vilis Gulbis
