= Lubahn =

Lubahn may refer to:

- Lubāna, a Latvian town

== People with the surname ==
- Andrew Lubahn (born 1991), American soccer player
- Douglas Lubahn (1947–2019), American musician
