= Indrāni Parish =

Parish of Madona Municipality, Latvia

- parish of Latvia
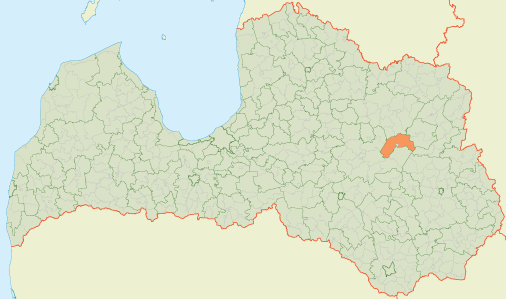
- Coordinates: 56°54′18″N 26°43′09″E
- Country: Latvia

Population (1 January 2026)
  - Total: 576

Indrāni Parish (Latvian: Indrānu pagasts) is an administrative unit of Madona Municipality, Latvia. The administrative center is located in the town of Lubāna, which is not a part of the parish.

Since 2021, the parish is a part of the local executive Lubāna Association (Latvian: Lubānas apvienība) together with Lubāna town. From 2007 to 2021, the parish was a part of Lubāna Municipality.
