= Ādolfs Bļodnieks =

Latvian politician

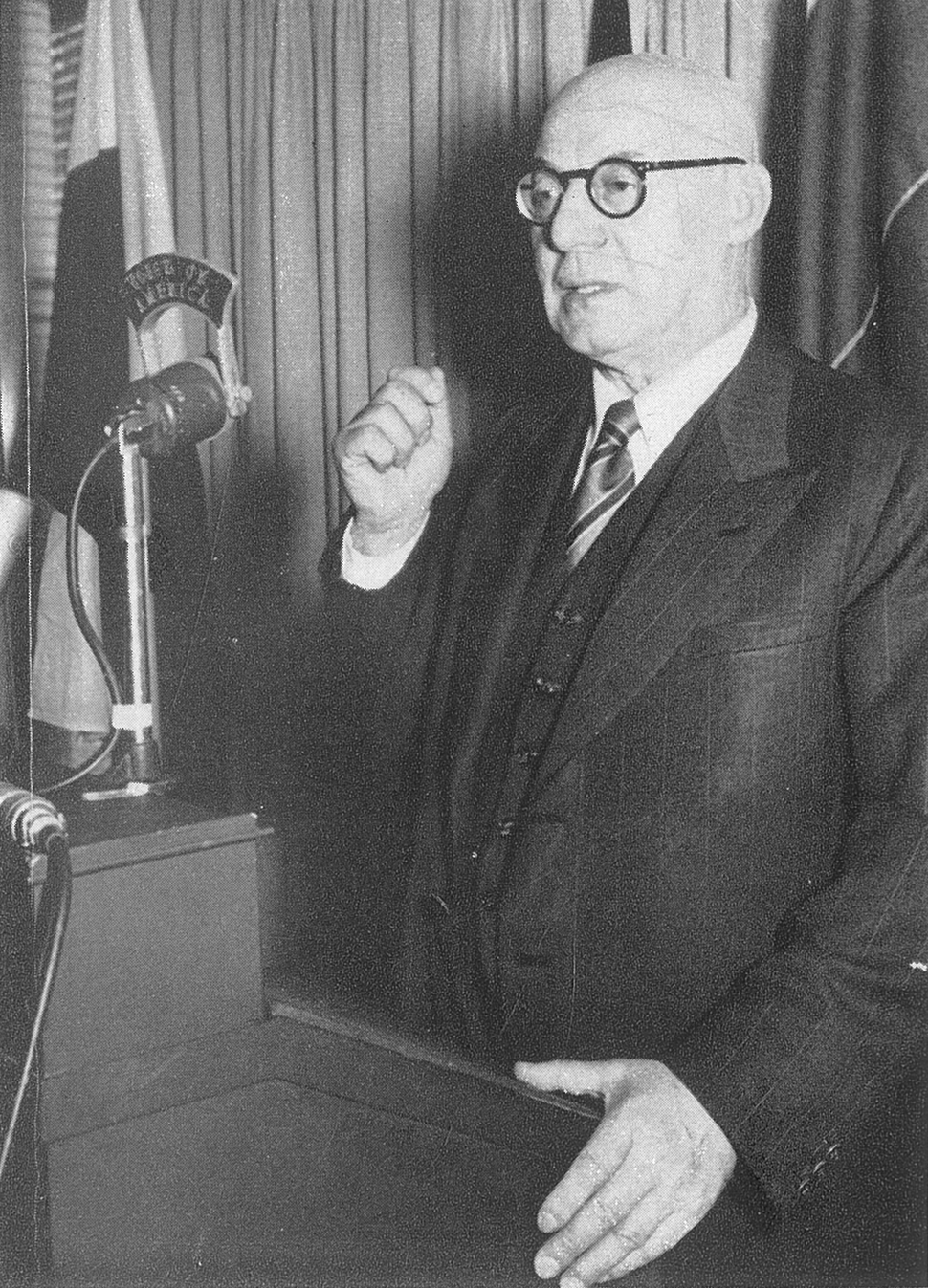

9th Prime Minister of Latvia
- In office 24 March 1933 – 16 March 1934
- President: Alberts Kviesis
- Preceded by: Marģers Skujenieks
- Succeeded by: Kārlis Ulmanis

Personal details
- Born: 24 July 1889 Courland Governorate, Russian Empire
- Died: 21 March 1962 (aged 72) New York City, U.S.
- Party: New Farmers-Small Landowners Party
- Other political affiliations: Latvian Social Democratic Workers' Party
- Spouse: Anna Bļodniece
- Education: Harvard University
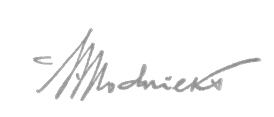
- Signature

Ādolfs Bļodnieks (24 July 1889 – 21 March 1962) was a Latvian politician and Prime Minister of Latvia from 24 March 1933 – 16 March 1934, for the New Farmers' Party.

== Gallery ==
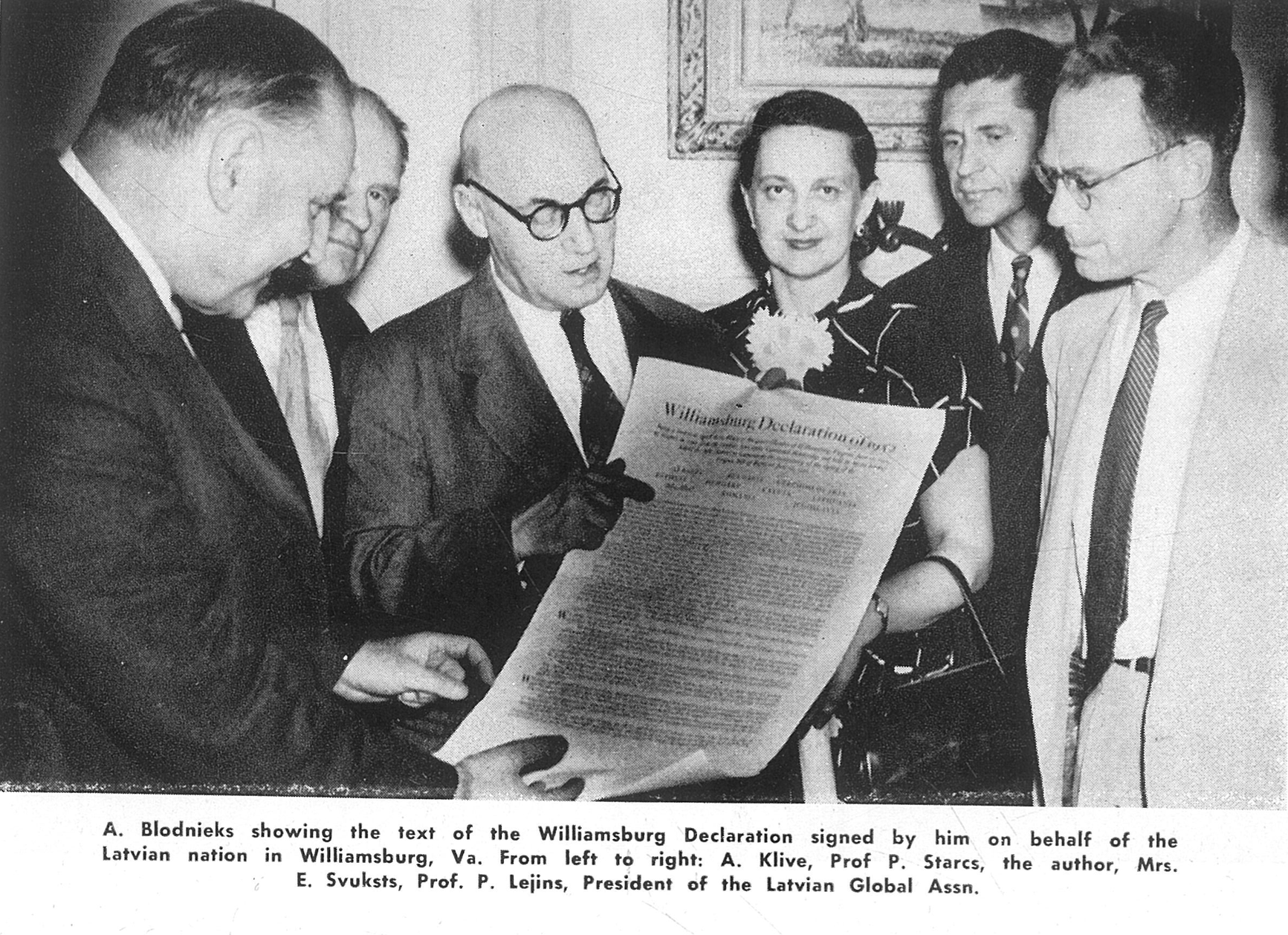
Williamsburg Declaration signed by A.Blodnieks in Williamsburg, Va. From left A.Klive, Prof.P.Starcs, Mrs.E.Svuksts, Prof.P.Lejins, President of the Latvian Global Assn

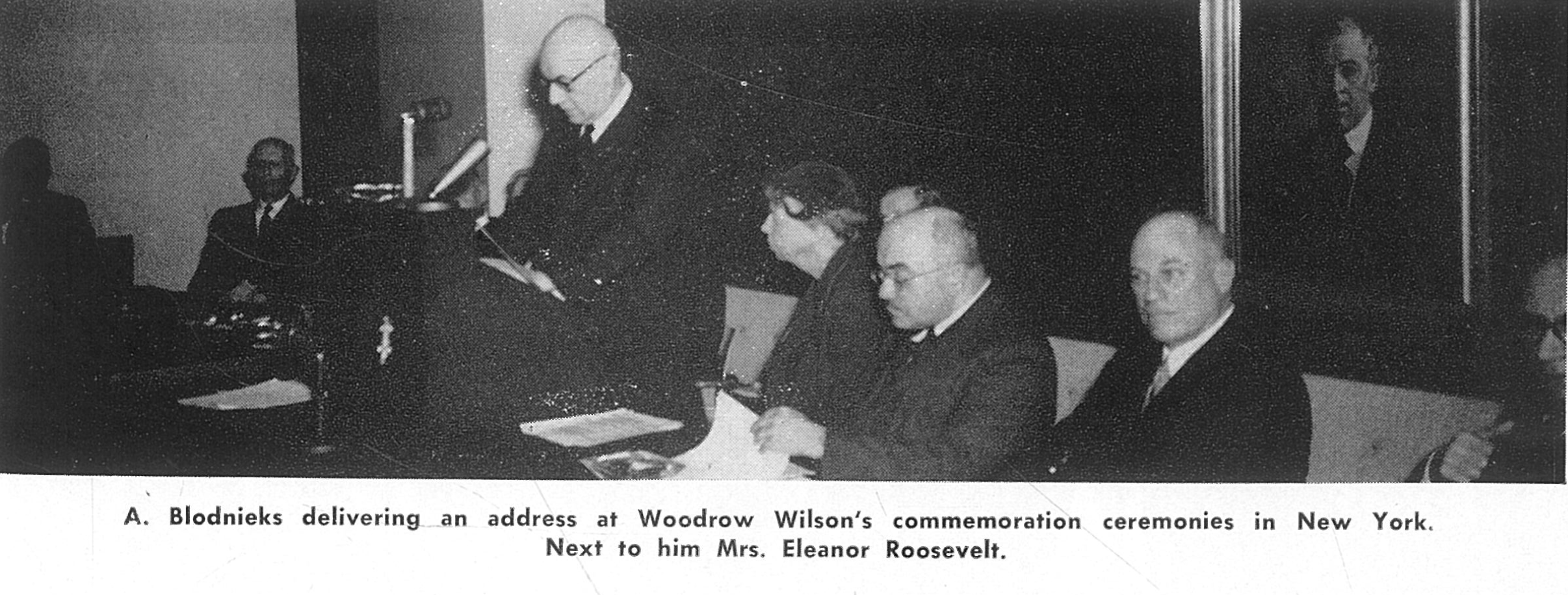
A.Blodnieks delivering an address at Woodrow Wilson's commemoration ceremonies in New York. Next to him Mrs. Eleanor Roosevelt

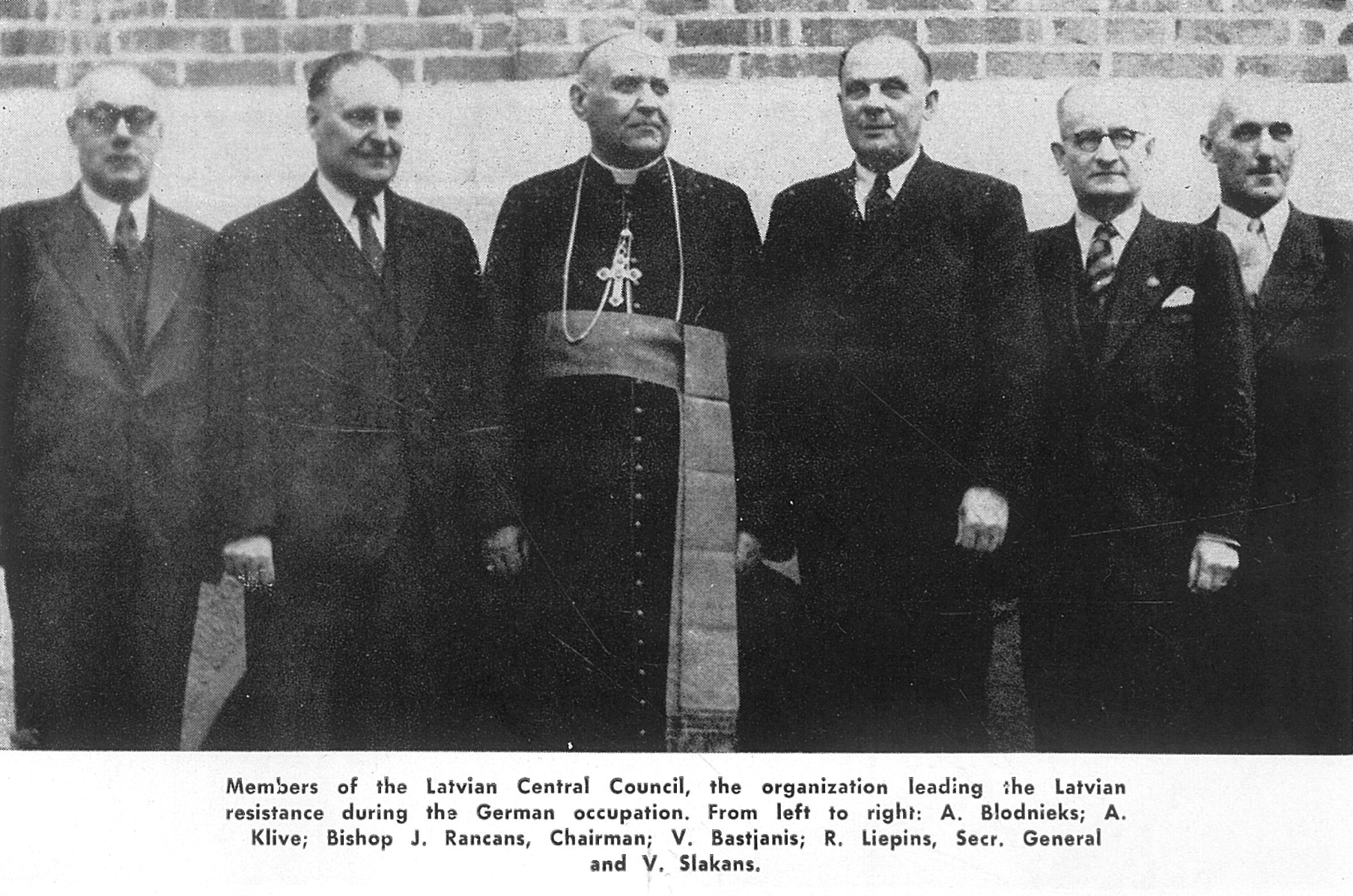
Members of the Latvian Central Council, leading the Latvian resistance during the German occupation. From left to right A.Blodnieks; A.Klive; Bishop J.Rancans, chairman; V.Bastjanis; R.Liepins, Secr.General, V.Slakans

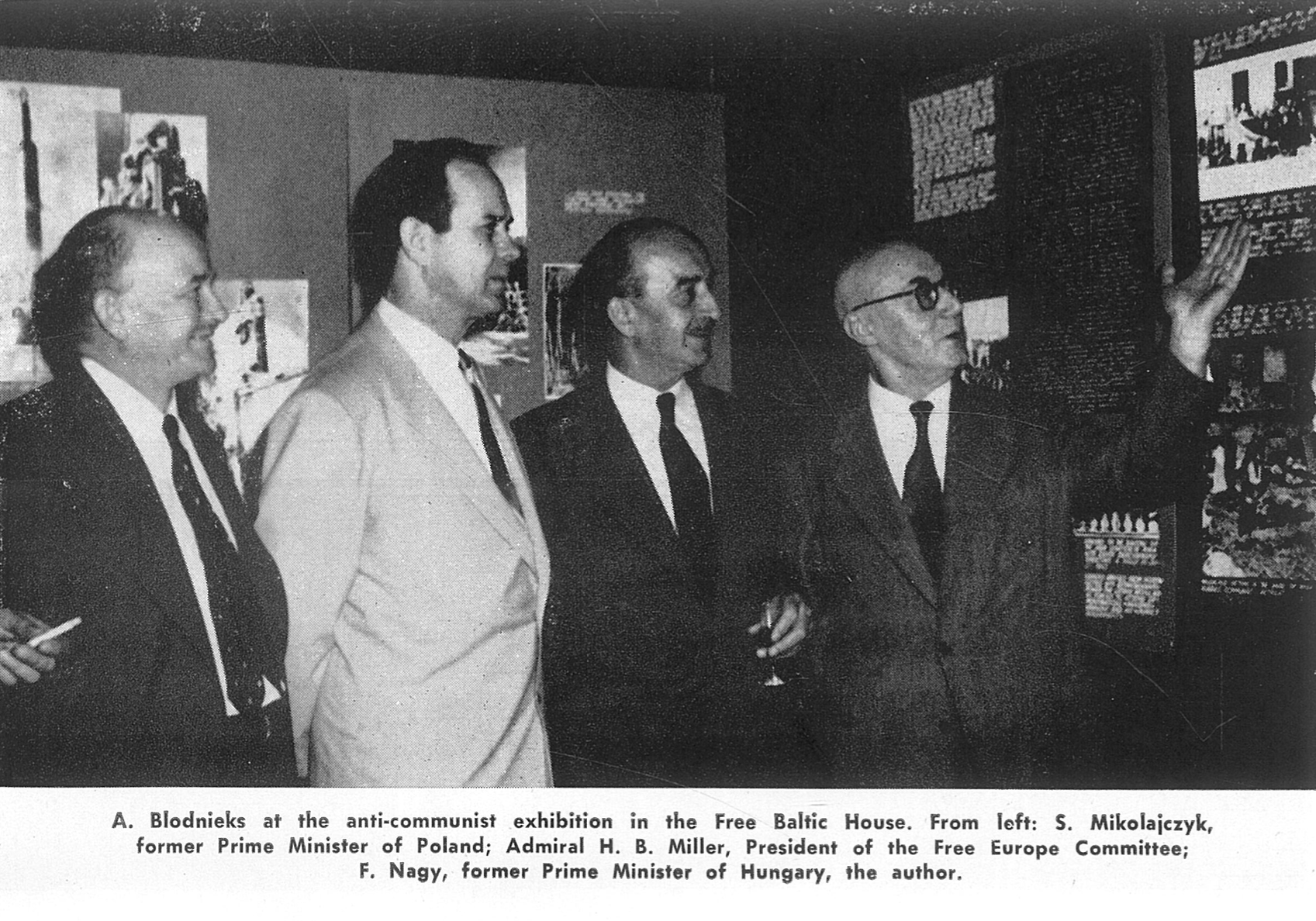
A.Blodnieks at the anti-communist exh. in the Free Baltic House. From left S.Mikolajczyk (Prime Minister of Poland), Admiral H.B.Miller (President of the European Committee), F.Nagy (Prime Minister of Hungary)

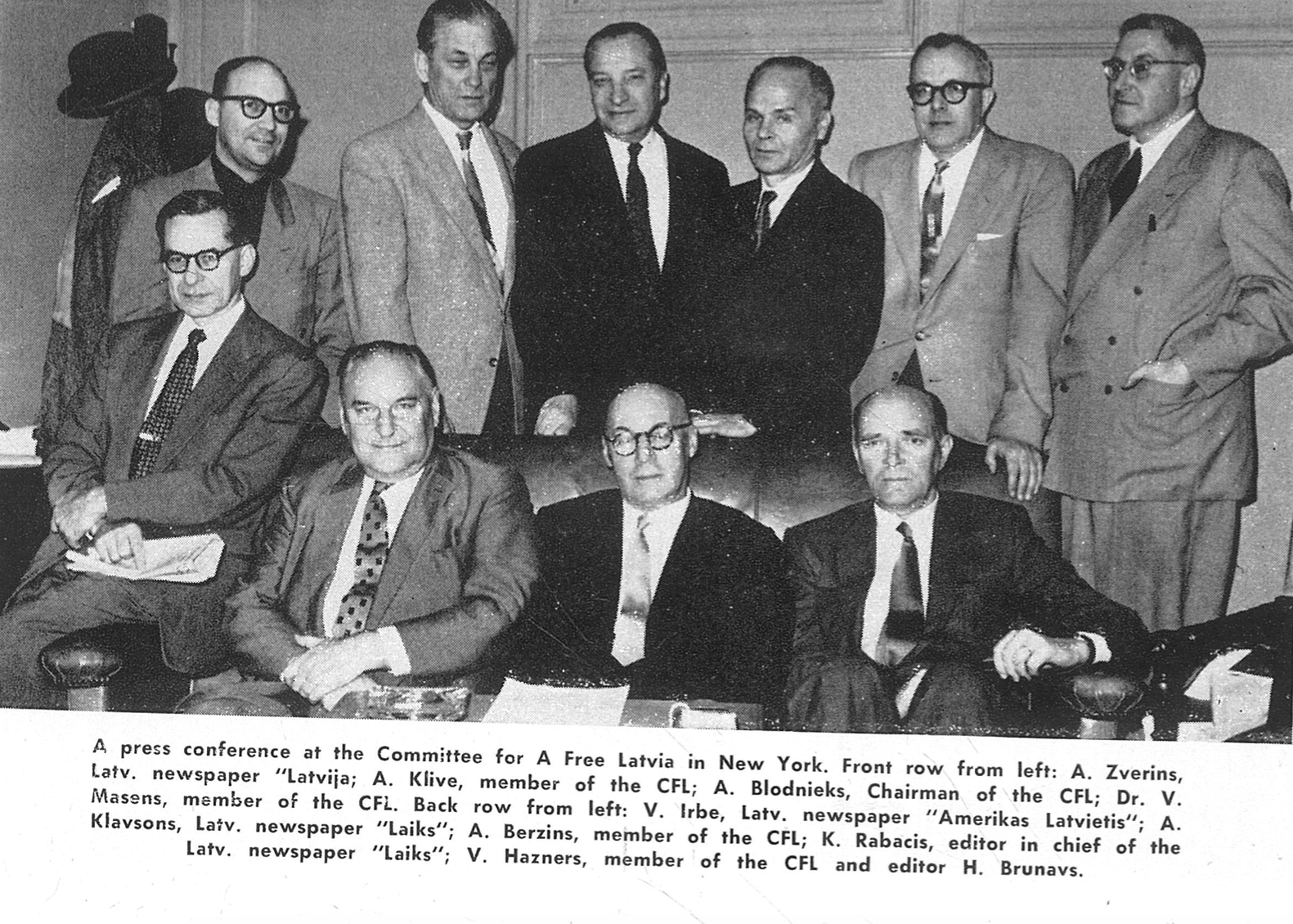
A press conference at the Committee for The Free Latvia in New York. CFL Representatives of newspaper "Latvija", "Amerikas Latvietis", "Laiks"

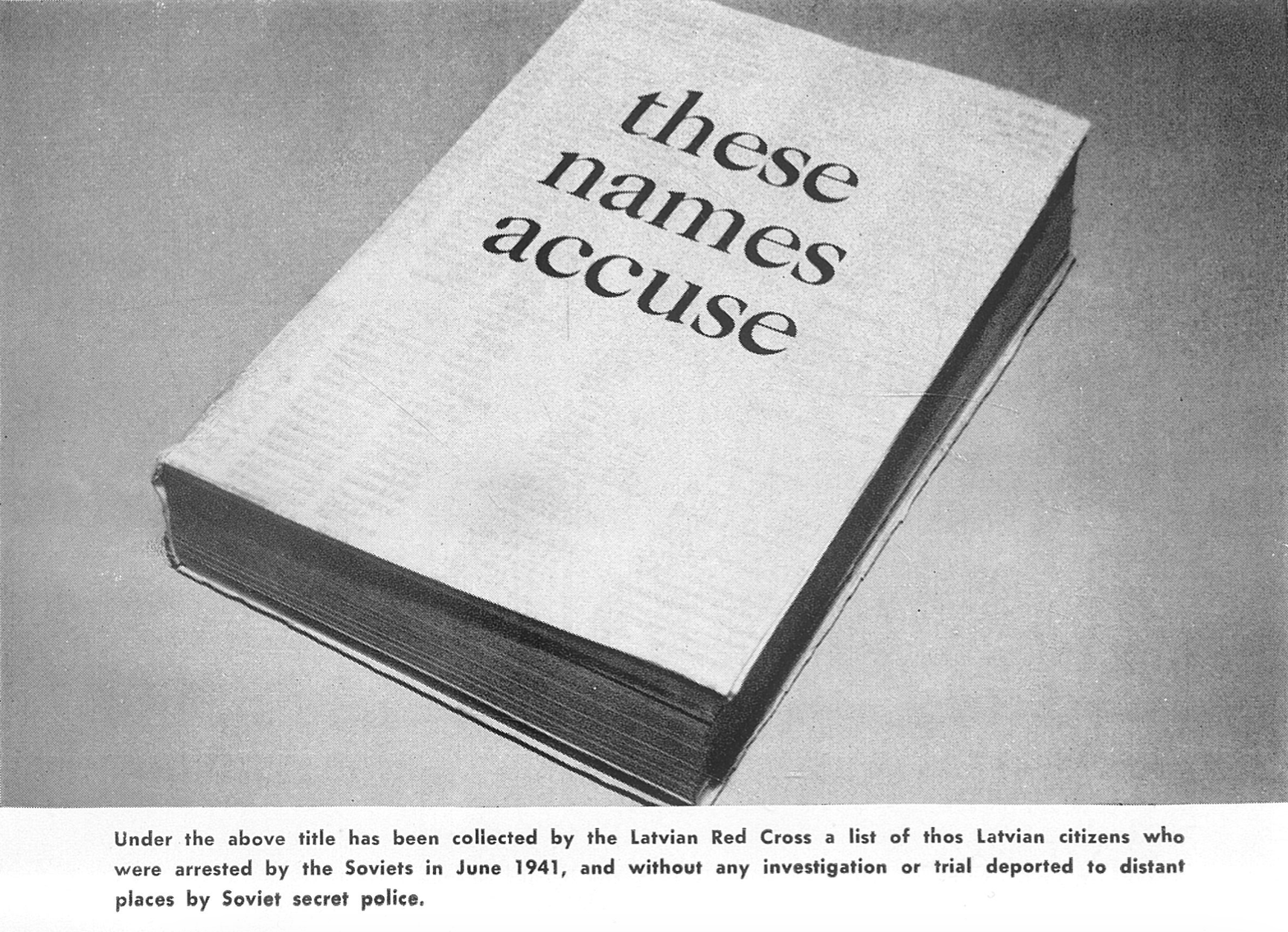
Collection by the Latvian Red Cross - a list of those Latvian citizens arrested by the Soviets in June 1941, and without any investigation or trial deported to distant places by Soviet police

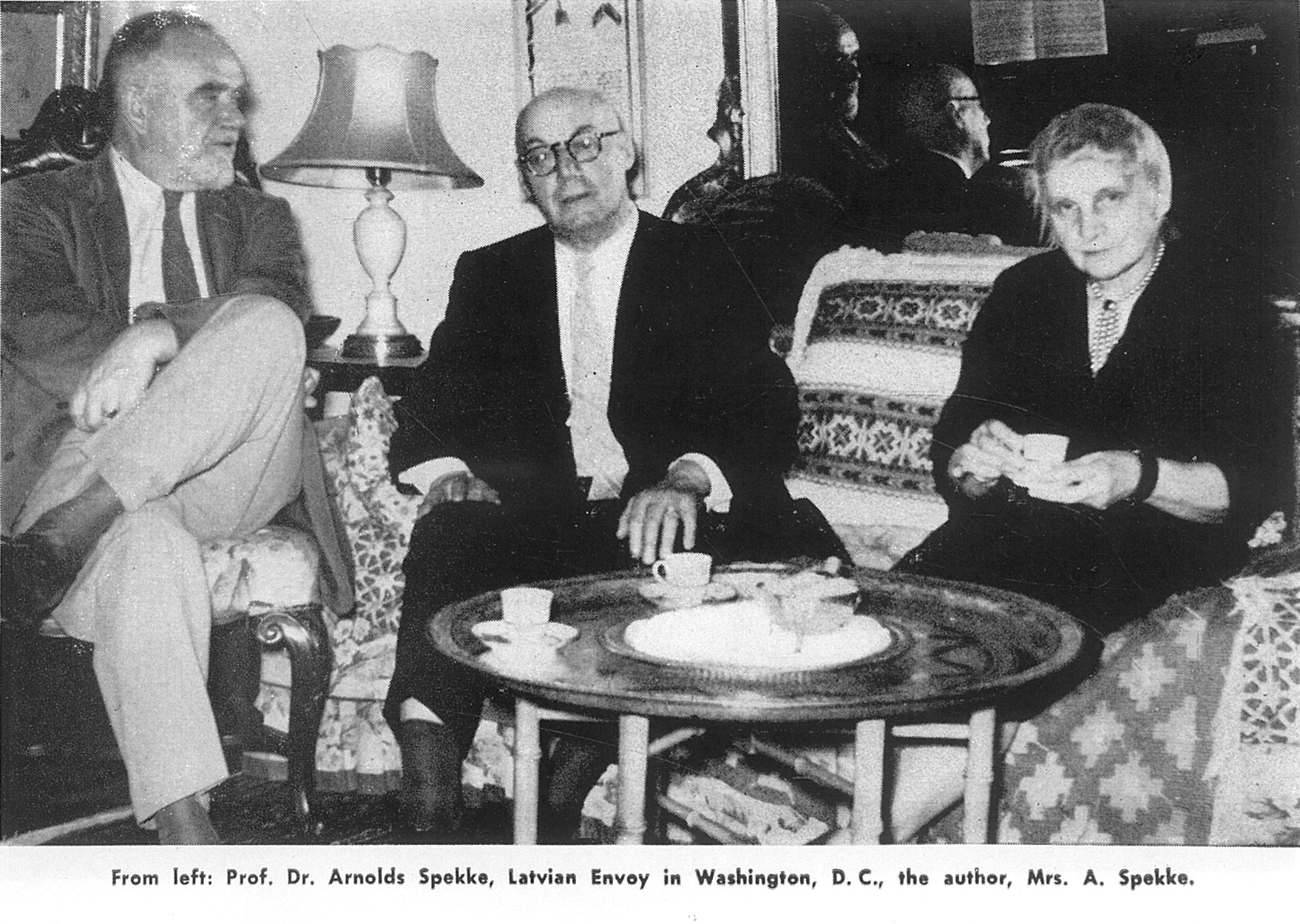
From left Prof. Dr. Arnolds Spekke, Latvian Envoy in Washington, D.C., A. Blodnieks, Mrs. A. Spekke

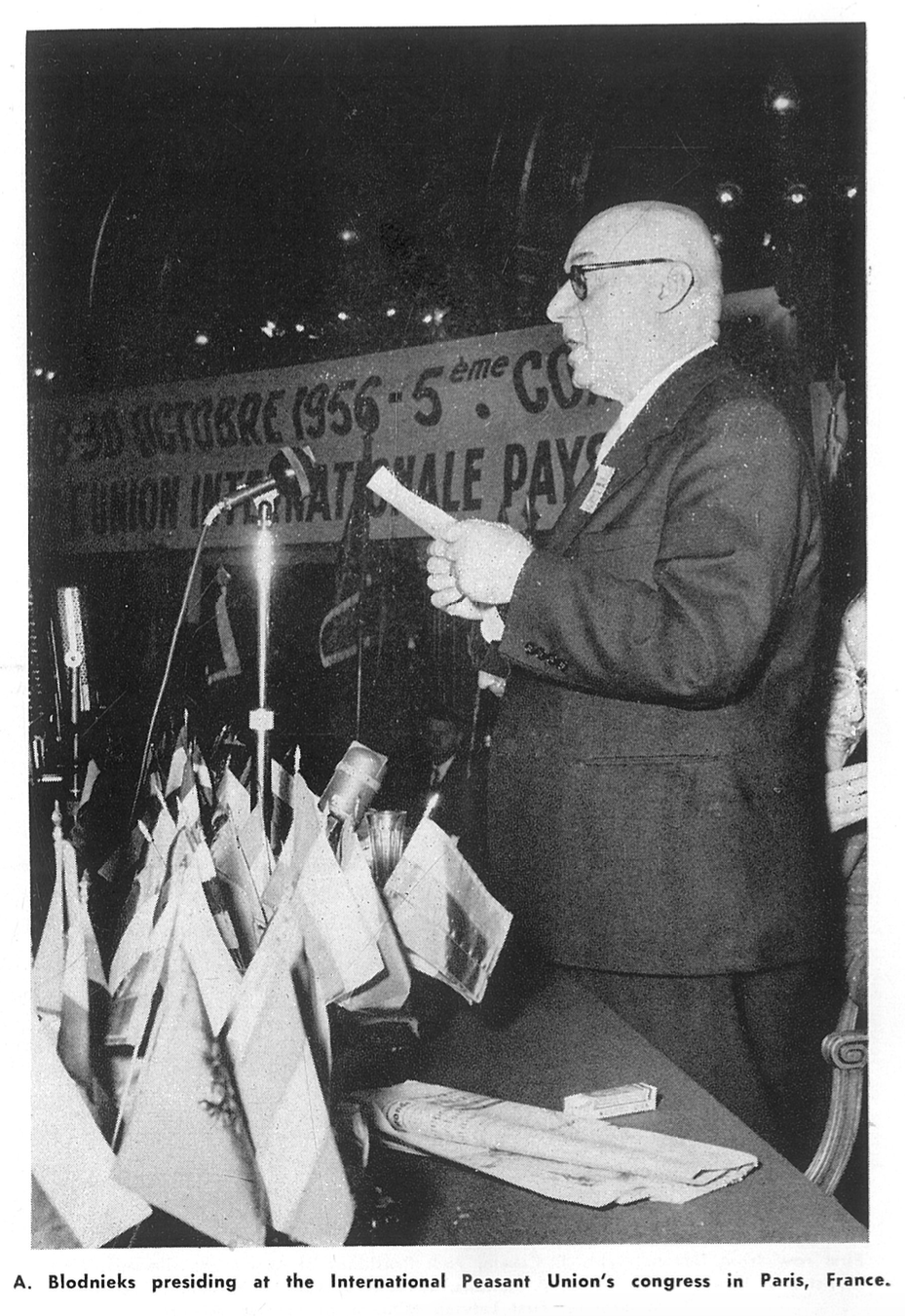
A. Blodnieks presiding at the International Union's congress in Paris, France

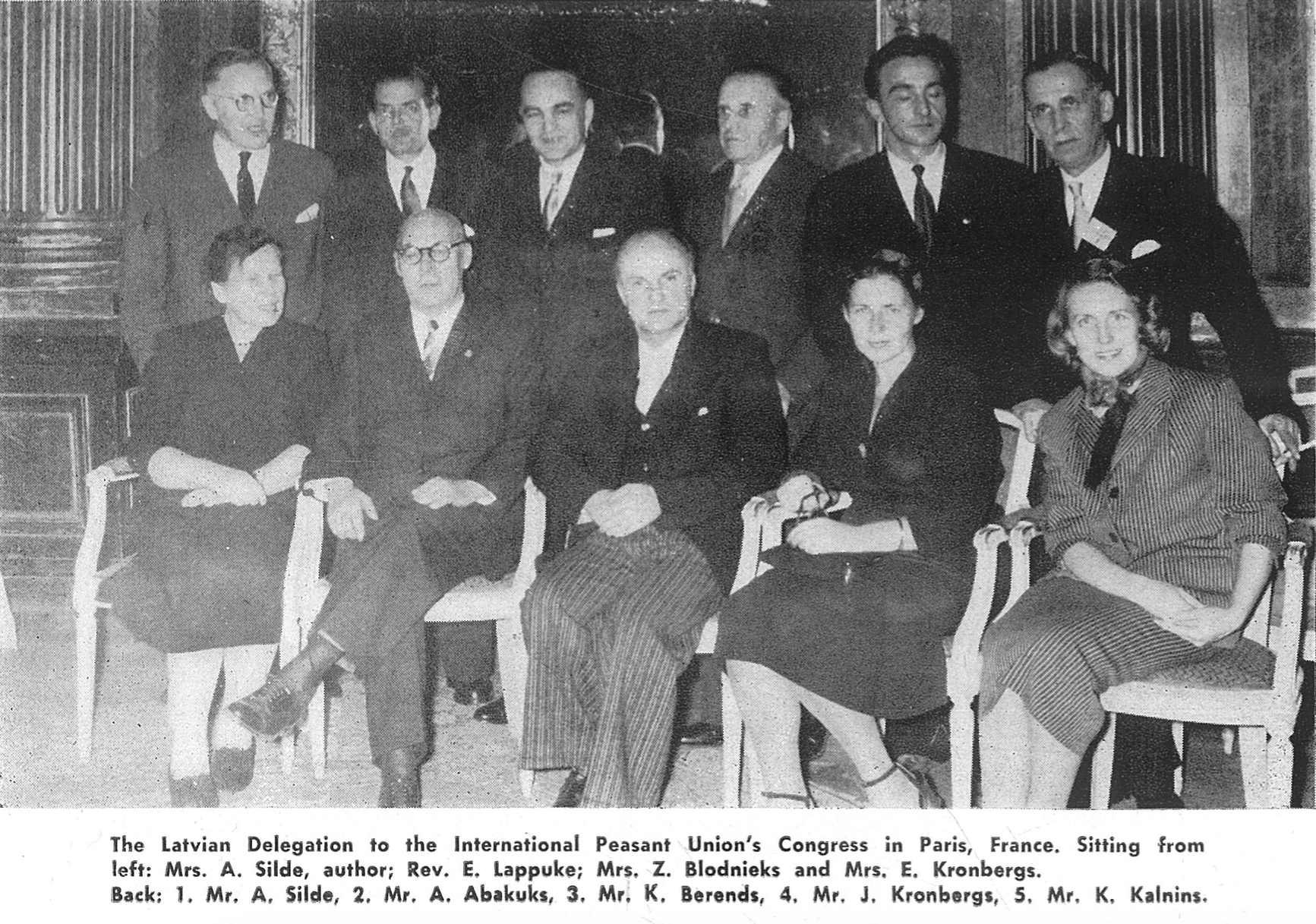
The Latvian Delegation to the International Peasant Union's Congress in Paris, France. Sitting from left Mrs.A.Silde, A.Blodnieks, E.Lappuke, Mrs.Z.Blodnieks, Mrs.E.Kronbergs. Back - Mr.A.Silde, Mr.A.Abakuks, Mr.Kalnins

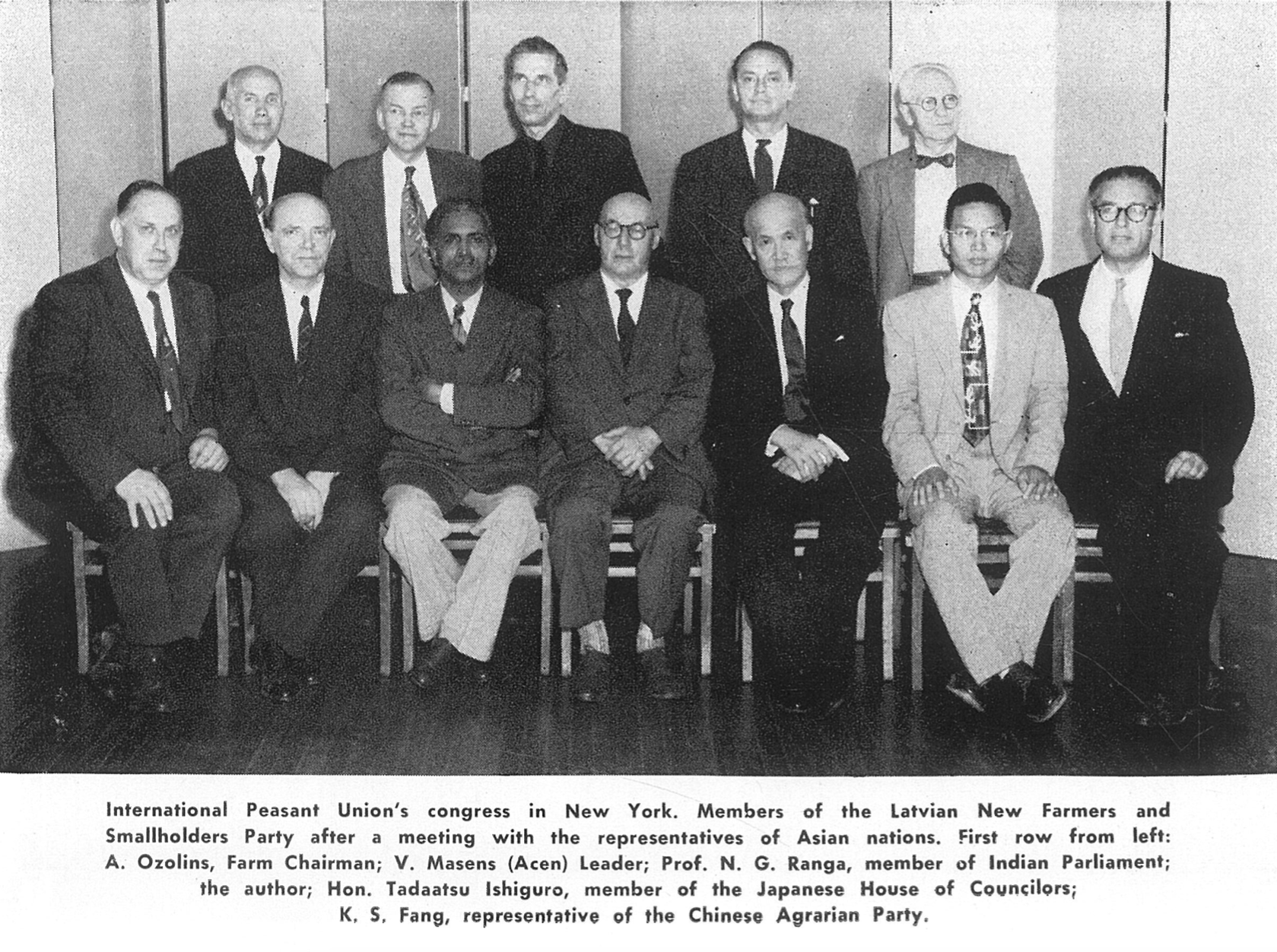
International Peasant Union's congress in New York. Members of the Latvian New Farmers and Smallholders Party with the representatives of Asian nations

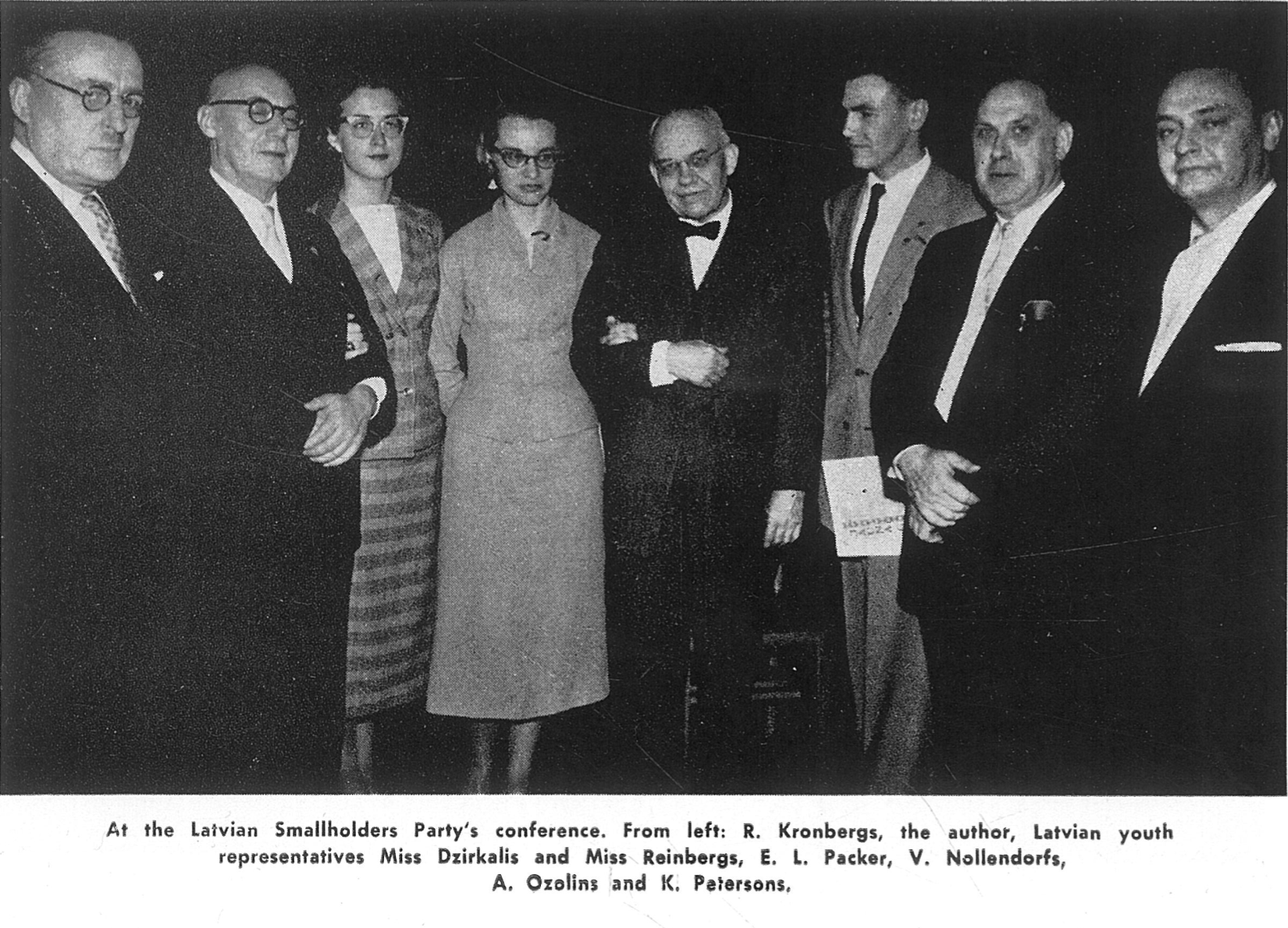
Latvian Smallholders Party's conference. From left R. Kronbergs, A. Blodnieks, Latvian youth representatives Miss Dzirkalis and Miss Reinbergs, E. L. Packer, V. Nollendorf, A. Ozolins and K. Petersons

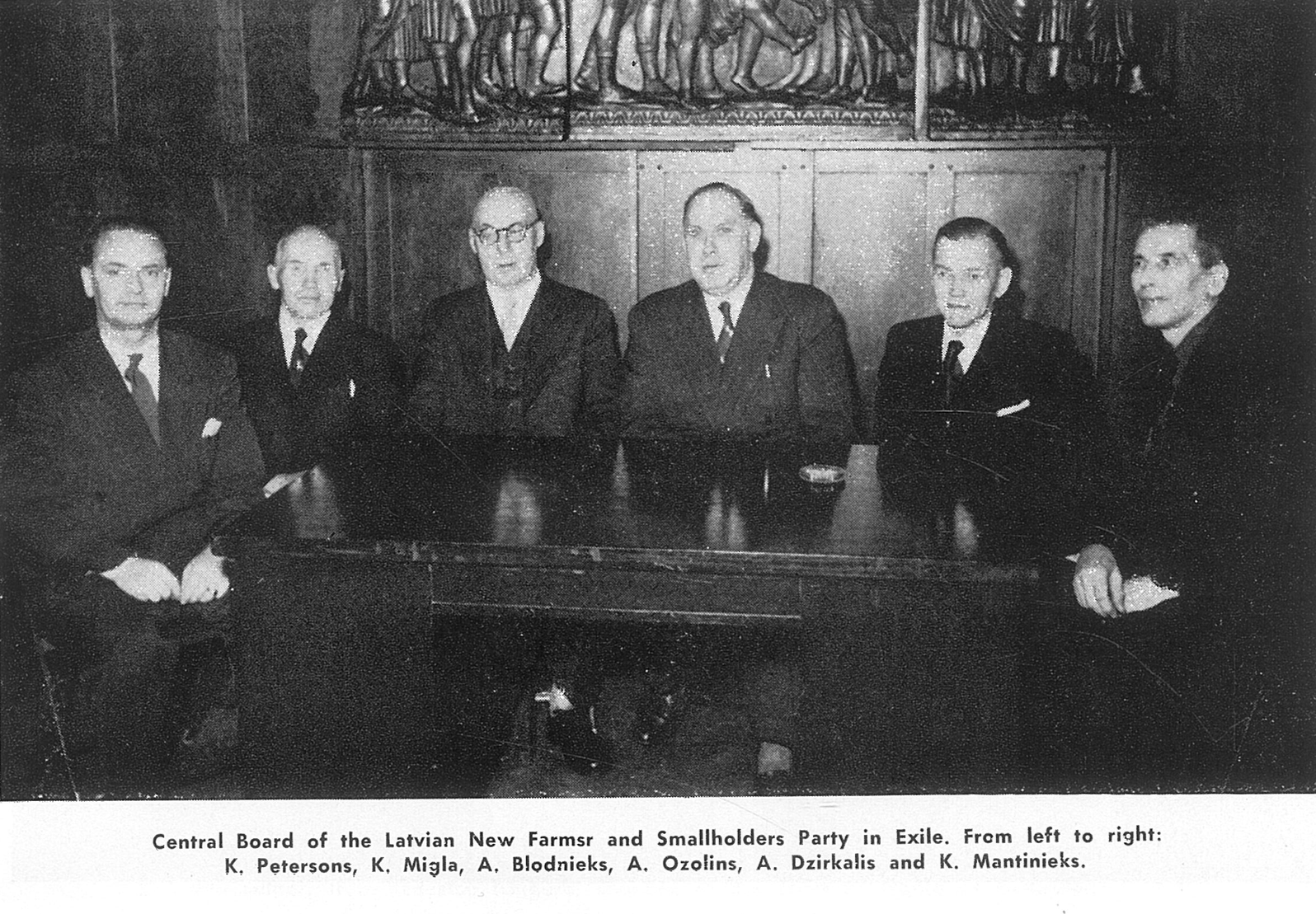
Central Board of the Latvian New Farms and Smallholders Party in Exile. From left to right K. Peterson, K. Migla, A. Blodnieks, A. Ozolins, A. Dzirkalis and K. Mantinieks

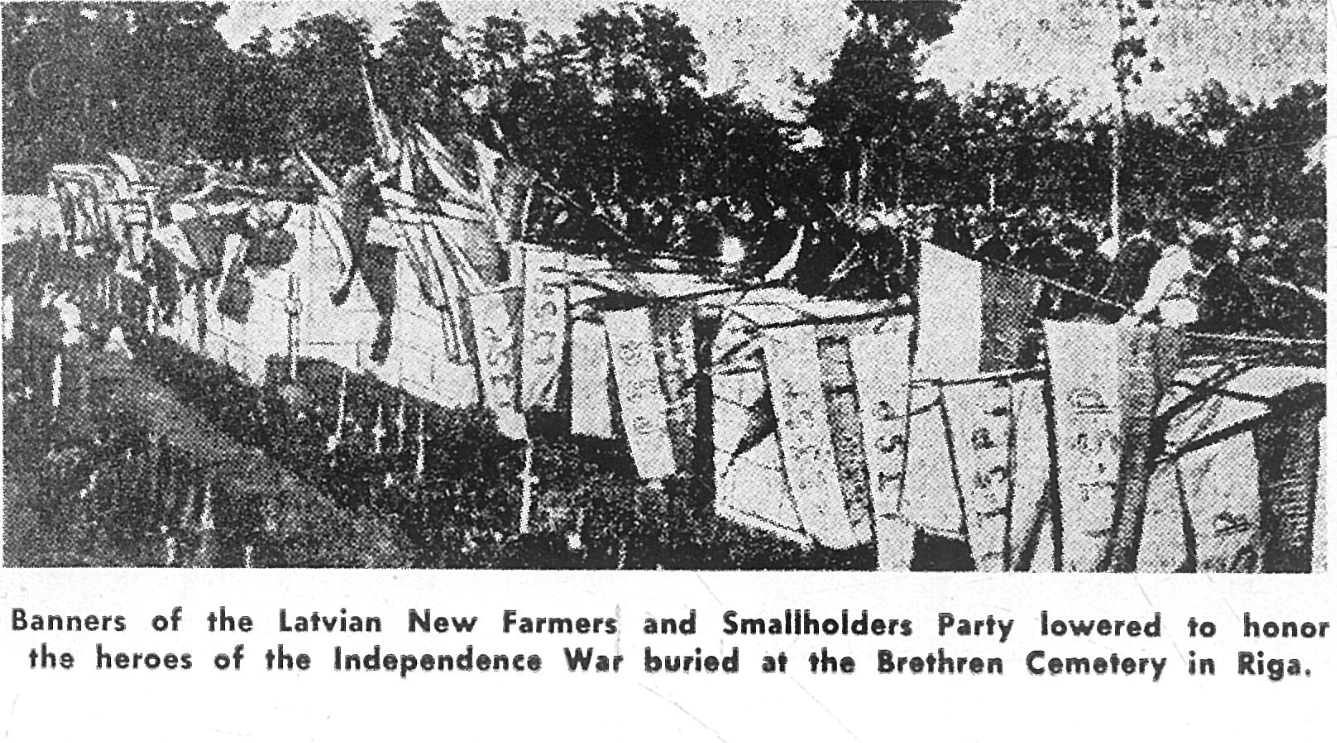
Banners of the Latvian New Farms and Smallholders Party lowered to honor the heroes of the Independence War buried at the Brethren Cemetery in Riga

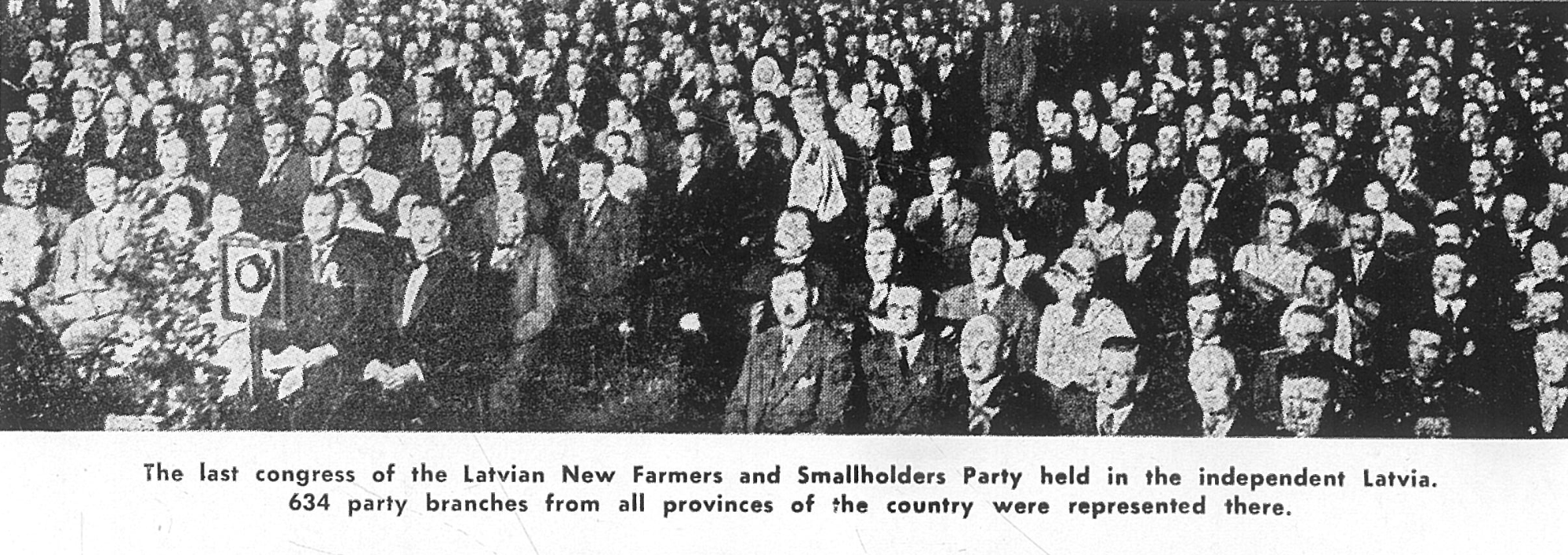
The last congress of the Latvian New Farms and Smallholders Party held in Latvia. 634 party branches from all provinces of the country represented

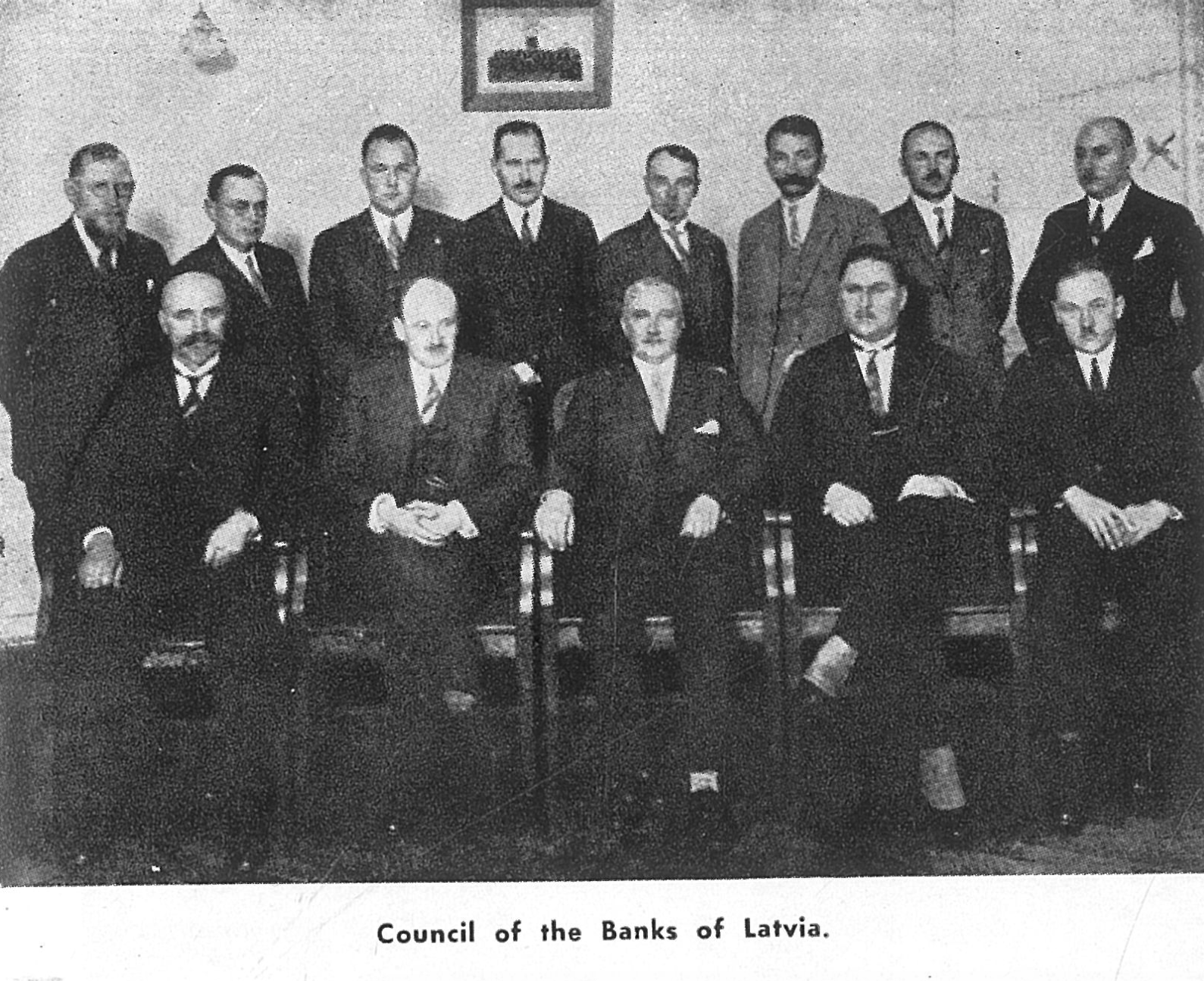
Council of the Banks of Latvia

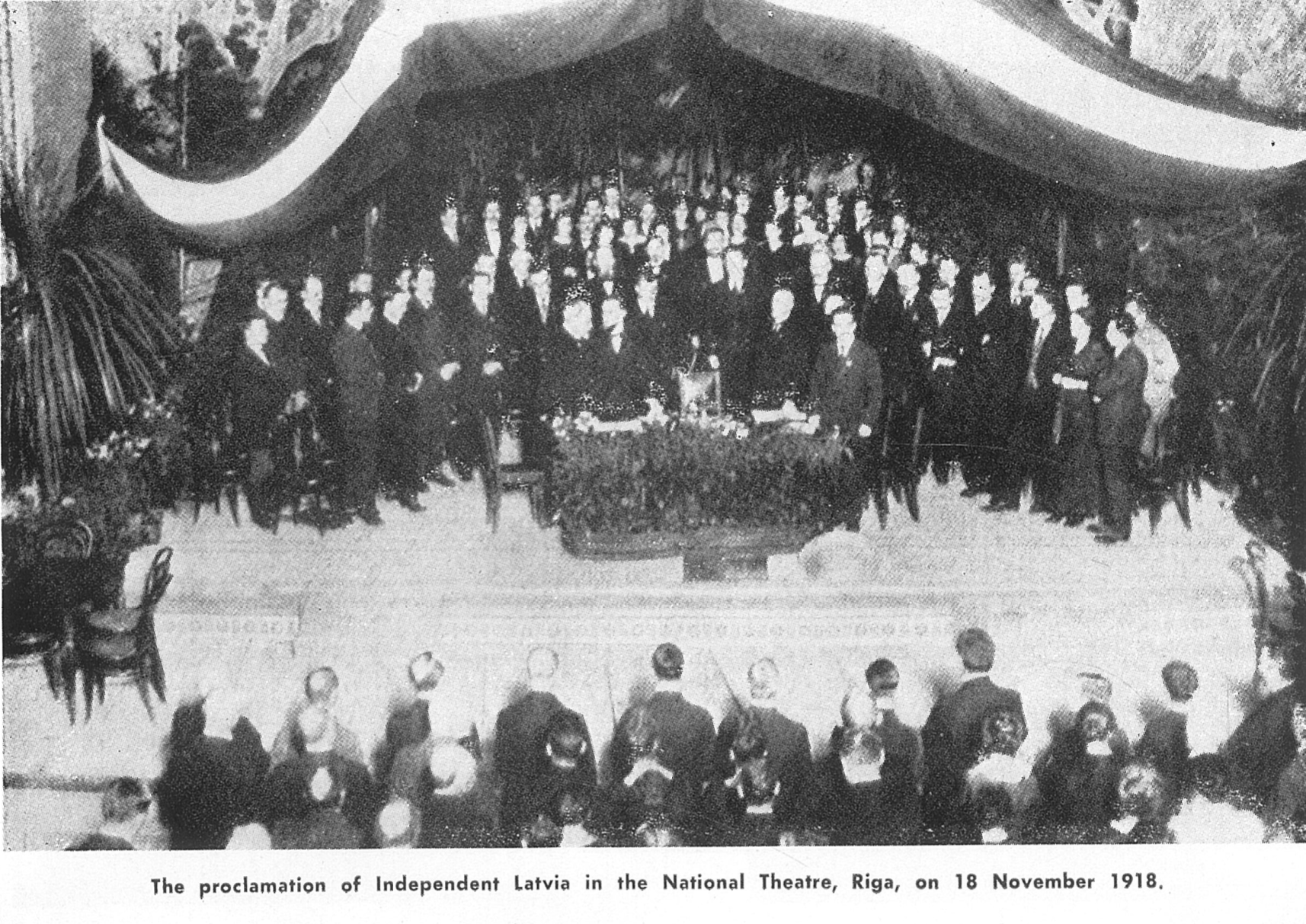
The proclamation of Independent Latvia in the National Theatre, Riga, on November 18, 1918

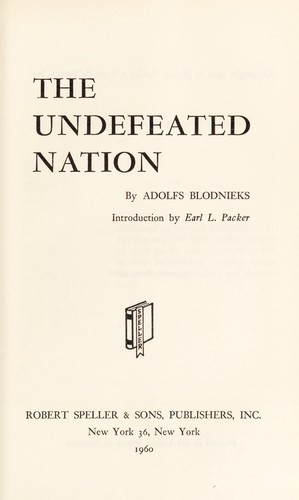
The Undefeated Nation by Adolfs Blodnieks Prime Minister of Latvia. Robert Speller & Sons, Publishers, Inc. NY, 1960

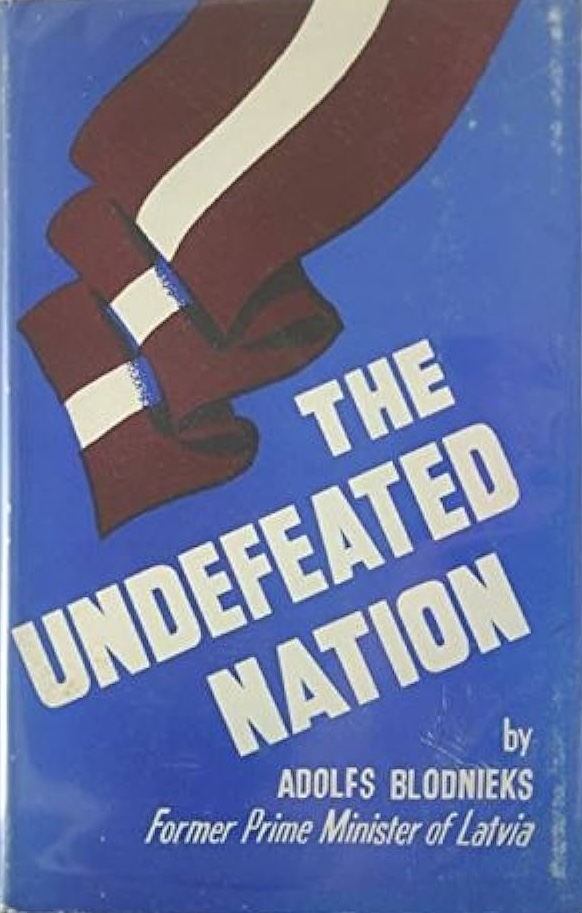
The Undefeated Nation by Adolfs Blodnieks Prime Minister of Latvia

== Published works ==
- The Undefeated Nation. Speller & Sons, New York. 1960.

Political offices
Preceded by Marģers Skujenieks	Prime Minister of Latvia; 24 March 1933 – 16 March 1934	Succeeded by Kārlis Ulmanis
