= 1993 Latvian presidential election =

← 1933	July 7, 1993	1996 →
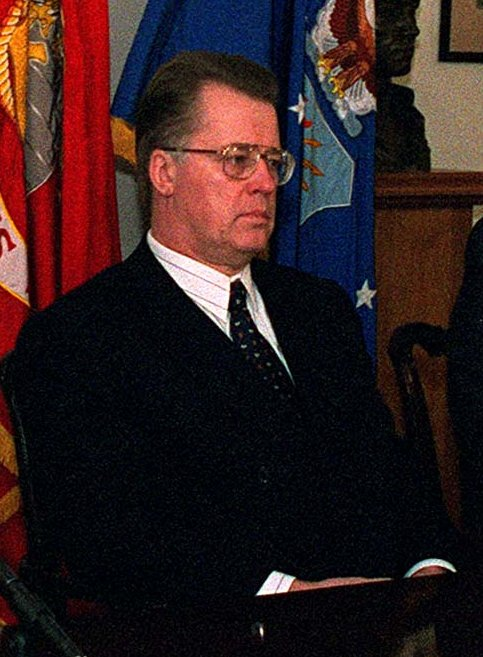

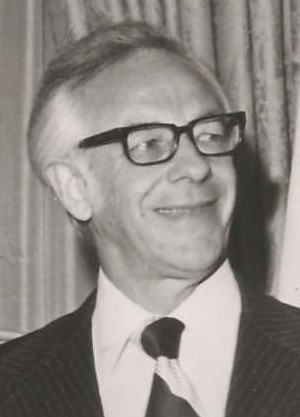
Nominee	Guntis Ulmanis	Aivars Jerumanis	Gunārs Meierovics
Party	LZS	Christian Democratic Union (Latvia)	Latvian Way
Electoral vote	53	Excluded	Withdrew
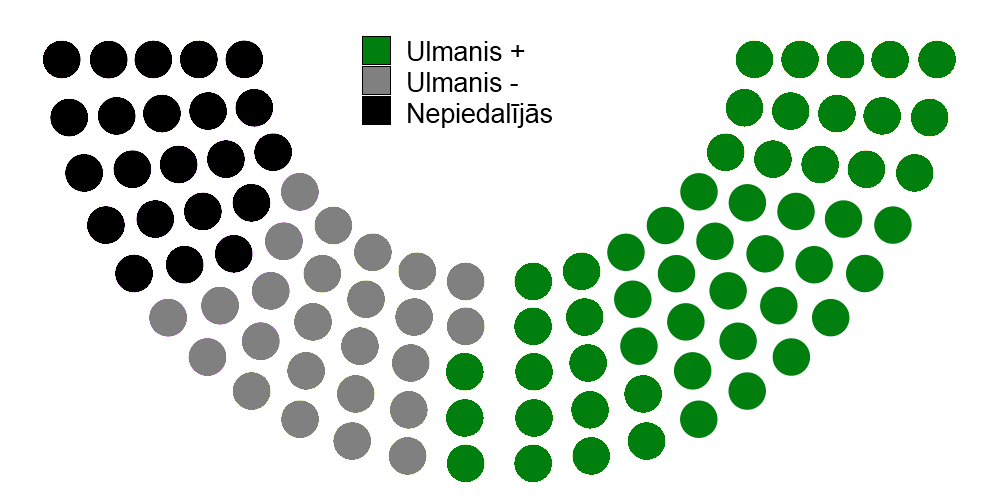
- Votes by MPs
President before election
Anatolijs Gorbunovs
Latvian Way
Elected President
Guntis Ulmanis
LZS

The 1993 presidential elections in Latvia took place on July 7, 1993. It was the first presidential election after the restoration of Latvia's independence. Guntis Ulmanis was elected the 5th President of Latvia.

== Rules ==
In the first round of presidential elections, the parties represented in the Saeima nominate their presidential candidates. In order for a candidate to be elected, at least 51 out of 100 Saeima deputies must vote for the candidate. If in the first round none of the candidates receive the required number of votes, a second ballot will be held. If the winner is not determined after the second time, the candidate who has received the fewest votes in the previous round will be excluded from the election with each subsequent round. If, in the last round with 2 candidates, none of them receives at least 51 votes, new elections are held in which new or existing candidates are nominated.

== Candidates ==
Candidate	Party
Guntis Ulmanis	Latvian Farmers' Union
Aivars Jerumanis	Christian Democratic Union
Gunārs Meierovics	Latvian Way

== Election process and results ==
The first round of elections took place on July 6. In the first round of voting, none of the candidates was able to collect the required number of votes. Guntis Ulmanis received 12 votes, Aivars Jerumanis received 14 votes, but Gunārs Meierovics received 35 votes. As it had been decided in advance that if the President was not elected in one round, the next round would take place the following day, and the second round of voting was postponed to the next sitting on July 7.

According to the law, the same three candidates had to participate in the second round as in the first round, but the winner of the largest number of votes in the first round, Meierovics, had withdrawn his candidacy in favor of Ulmanis. In this round, Guntis Ulmanis received 46 votes, but Aivars Jerumanis only had 10 votes. Consequently, it was necessary to vote in the third round, in which Jerumanis no longer participated as the owner of the smallest number of votes in the second round. Only Ulmanis took part in the third round of voting, receiving 53 votes in favor and 26 votes against and being elected the first President of the restored Republic of Latvia.

Candidate	Party	Votes	%
Guntis Ulmanis	Latvian Farmers' Union	53	67.09
Against		26	32.91
Total		79	100.00
