= Gunārs Meierovics =

Latvian politician

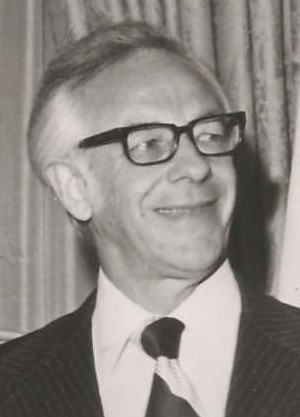
- Meierovics in 1974

Personal details
- Born: 12 May 1920 Riga, Latvia
- Died: 11 February 2007 (aged 86) Riga, Latvia
- Party: Latvian Farmers' Union; Latvian Way
- Spouse(s): Aina Maurins Meierovics (div.) Ingrida Meierovica
- Children: 2

Gunārs Meierovics (12 May 1920 – 11 February 2007) was a Latvian politician and the youngest son of the second Prime Minister of Latvia Zigfrīds Anna Meierovics. Meierovics was also a candidate for the 1993 Latvian presidential election.

== Biography ==
Meierovics was born on 12 May 1920 in Riga to Zigfrīds Anna Meierovics and his wife Anna Meierovics. He studied economics and engineering at the University of Latvia and Baltic University after becoming a war refugee. He was drafted into the Latvian Legion in World War II but emigrated to the United States after fleeing to Germany, where he worked at the United States Department of Defense. He was active in the American Latvian Association. In 1961, he was one of the main activists in the establishment of the United Baltic Committee in the United States. Meierovics also led the World Association of Free Latvians.

In 1993, he was elected to the fifth Saeima, and from the list of the political party Latvian Way, he was nominated as a candidate for president in the 1993 Latvian presidential election. Meirovics withdrew in support for the candidate Guntis Ulmanis. In the government of Valdis Birkavs, Meierovics held the position of the Minister of State of the Baltic and Nordic States at the Ministry of Foreign Affairs. In November 1995, Meierovics was awarded the Order of the Three Stars of the 3rd class. In 2001, Meierovics was awarded the PBLA Prize "for his extensive, long-lasting and successful work in strengthening the political position of the Baltics in the United States and Europe, in the struggle for the freedom of our nation and for the introduction of the new generation into Latvian central organizations."

Meierovics died on 11 February 2007, after battling Alzheimer's. Then-president Vaira Vīķe-Freiberga and Minister of Foreign Affairs Artis Pabriks expressed their condolences to his relatives.
