= Miltiņi =

Village in Latvia

Coordinates: 56°38′N 23°20′E

Miltiņi is a village in the Bērze Parish of Dobele Municipality in the Semigallia region of Latvia, and the Zemgale Planning Region.
