= Madona district =

District of Latvia

Coordinates: 56°51′N 26°13′E

Madona district Madonas rajons
- District
- Coat of arms

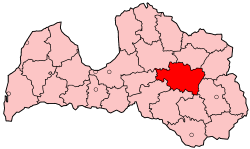
- Country: Latvia

Area
  - Total: 3,349.3 km^{2} (1,293.2 sq mi)

Population
  - Total: 44,306
  - Density: 13.228/km^{2} (34.261/sq mi)
- Website: madona.lv/

Madona district (Latvian: Madonas rajons) was an administrative division of Latvia from 1949 to 2009. it was located in the Vidzeme and Latgale regions in the country's east. Within the district is the highest point in Latvia - Gaiziņkalns. The district also bordered Latvia's largest lake, Lake Lubāns.

Districts were eliminated during the administrative-territorial reform in 2009. Most of Madona district was merged with the town of Madona to form Madona Municipality. Cesvaine, Ērgļi, Lubāna and Varakļāni were split off as separate municipalities until 2021.

== Cities ==
- Cesvaine
- Lubāna
- Madona
- Varakļāni
