= Šķibe =

Coordinates: 56°37′N 23°25′E

Šķibe is a village in the Bērze Parish of Dobele Municipality in the Semigallia region of Latvia and the Zemgale Planning Region.
