= Bērze Parish =

Parish of Latvia

- parish of Latvia
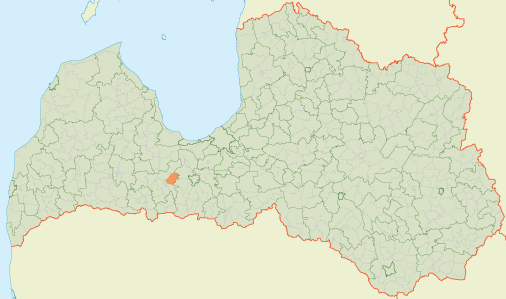
- 56°39′16″N 23°23′30″E
- Country: Latvia

Area
  - Total: 80.57 km^{2} (31.11 sq mi)
  - Land: 78.92 km^{2} (30.47 sq mi)
  - Water: 1.65 km^{2} (0.64 sq mi)

Population (1 January 2025)
  - Total: 1,538
  - Density: 19.49/km^{2} (50.47/sq mi)

Bērze Parish (Latvian: Bērzes pagasts) is an administrative unit of Dobele Municipality in the Semigallia region of Latvia.

== Towns, villages and settlements of Bērze Parish ==
- Šķibe
- Miltiņi
- Bērze
