= Voldemārs Zāmuēls =

Latvian politician

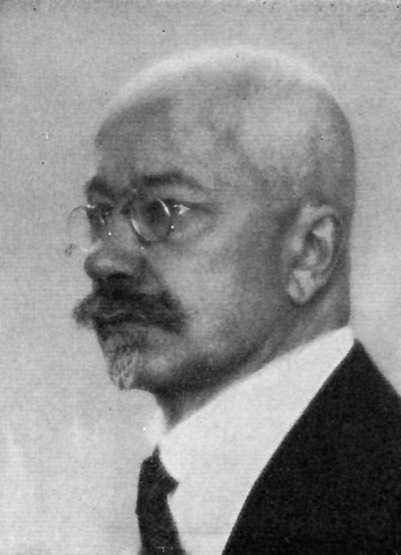
Voldemārs Zāmuēls

Voldemārs Roberts Zāmuēls (22 May 1872, in Dzērbene parish – 16 January 1948, in Ravensburg, French occupation zone in Germany) held the office as Prime Minister of Latvia from 27 January 1924 to 18 December, 1924.

Political offices
| Preceded by Jānis Pauļuks | Prime Minister of Latvia; 27 January 1924 – 18 December 1924 | Succeeded by Hugo Celmiņš |
