= Hugo Celmiņš =

Latvian politician (1877–1941)

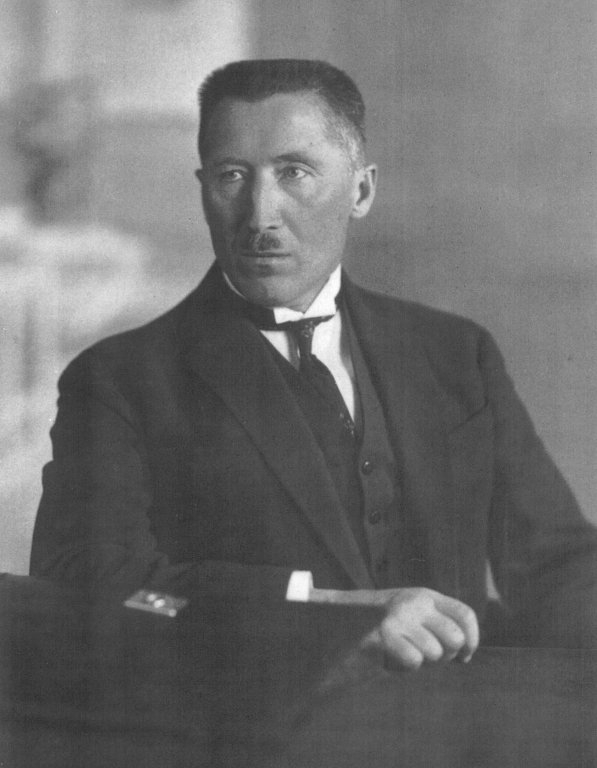

5th Prime Minister of Latvia
- In office 19 December 1924 – 23 December 1925
- Preceded by: Voldemārs Zāmuēls
- Succeeded by: Kārlis Ulmanis
- In office 1 December 1928 – 26 March 1931
- Preceded by: Pēteris Juraševskis
- Succeeded by: Kārlis Ulmanis

Personal details
- Born: 30 October 1877 Lubāna, Kreis Wenden, Governorate of Livonia, Russian Empire
- Died: 30 July 1941 (aged 63) Lefortovo Prison, Moscow Oblast, Russian SFSR, USSR
- Party: Latvian Farmers' Union

Hugo Celmiņš (30 October 1877 – 30 July 1941) was a Latvian politician, a public employee, agronomist, twice the Prime Minister of Latvia (19 December 1924 – 23 December 1925, and 1 December 1928 – 26 March 1931). Arrested and deported to the USSR after the Soviet occupation of Latvia in 1940, imprisoned in Moscow's Lefortovo Prison. On 30 July 1941 shot and buried in the mass graves of Kommunarka shooting ground. Hugo Celmiņš was one of those who developed agrarian reform in Latvia.

== Early life ==
Hugo Celmiņš was born on 30 October 1877 in the Lubāna parish (now Madona Municipality) as the youngest son in the family. H. Celmiņš studied from 1887 to 1891 at Lubānas Ministry School, then at the Gorku School of Agriculture. In 1898, after his military service, he was seen in reserve as an officer. Entered the Polytechnic Institute of Riga in 1899, completed in 1903 with a first-class agronome degree. In 1900, he was one of the founders of the Talavija student fraternity. Then worked as an agronomist and teacher in Russia. In 1913 and 1914, while studying at the University of Bern, Switzerland, developed a doctoral thesis but failed to defend since the war began and had to go to the front. In June 1919, he volunteered for the Jāņa Baloža brigade, fought against Bermondt, earning the rank of captain's service and the Order of Lāčplēsis.

== Prime minister ==
=== First term ===
The eighth Latvian government, led by Voldemārs Zāmuels, resigned on 2 December 1924. The President of Latvia Jānis Čakste nominated the politician who was known as the compiler and leader of the new cabinet, the member of the Latvian Farmers’ Union, Hugo Celmiņš. The new government was formed on 19 December 1924.

In the Hugo Celmiņš government declaration, national protection was raised as one of the top priorities. The statements made in declaration also reflected in the works: the army's numerical composition and military spending increased significantly (by 50%). The government's objectives in economic policy focused on establishing a balanced state budget and on supporting producers in the form of favourable credit conditions. The main economic objective was the increase in exports and the decline in imports. Agriculture was identified as the primary economic sector of Latvia. In the social field, the government of H. Celmiņš set out its goal to combat the cost of living by supporting the poor. In the foreign policy, Hugo Celmiņš government devoted great value to strengthening relations between Latvia and Estonia. The main objective of foreign policy was the establishment of the union of Baltic States. In parallel, the Latvian government took care of strengthening economic relations with neighbouring countries: a trade agreement with Lithuania, economic relations with the Soviet Union, trade conventions with France, Sweden, the Netherlands, Switzerland, etc.

=== Second term ===
The second cabinet of Hugo Celmiņš was drawn up immediately after the third Saeima elections. The government commenced its activities on 1 December 1928.

In the floods of 1928, 42% of all arable land in Latvia had suffered. Bad harvest had a negative impact on the overall economic situation in the country. The number of unemployed people increased and the number of livestock decreased significantly. To overcome the economic crisis, the government of Hugo Celmiņš offered to cut government budget spending, providing income through loans rather than raising taxes. One of the government's goals was to increase agricultural productivity and profitability. Farmers received special subsidies from the state budget, and the state ensured that prices for agricultural products were increased artificial domestically. To overcome the agricultural crisis cheap loans and different benefits for farms were accepted too. In internal policy, the government committed itself to ensure peace and order within the country and strict guarding of Latvia's borders. The emphasis was also placed on the establishment of a well-trained and patriotic army. Foreign policy, like in his first term, was aimed to develop closer cooperation between the Baltic states and to play an active role in the League of Nations.

After the loss of the post of Prime Minister, Hugo Celmiņš was elected the Head of the City of Riga on 23 April 1931. At that time, several important objects were built in Riga - the Freedom Monument, the Brothers' Cemetery, Rainis Cemetery.

== Titles, honours, awards ==
- Order of Lāčplēsis (3rd Class)
- Order of the Three Stars (1st Class, 2nd Class, 3rd Class)
- Order of the Cross of the Eagle (1st Class)
- Order of the Lithuanian Grand Duke Gediminas (1st Class)
- Order of the White Rose of Finland (1st Class)
- Order of Polonia Restituta (1st Class)
- Legion of Honour

Political offices
Preceded by Voldemārs Zāmuēls	Prime Minister of Latvia; 19 December 1924 – 23 December 1925	Succeeded by Kārlis Ulmanis
Preceded by Pēteris Juraševskis	Prime Minister of Latvia; 1 December 1928 – 26 March 1931	Succeeded by Kārlis Ulmanis
