= Lubāna =

Town in Madona Municipality, Latvia

- Town
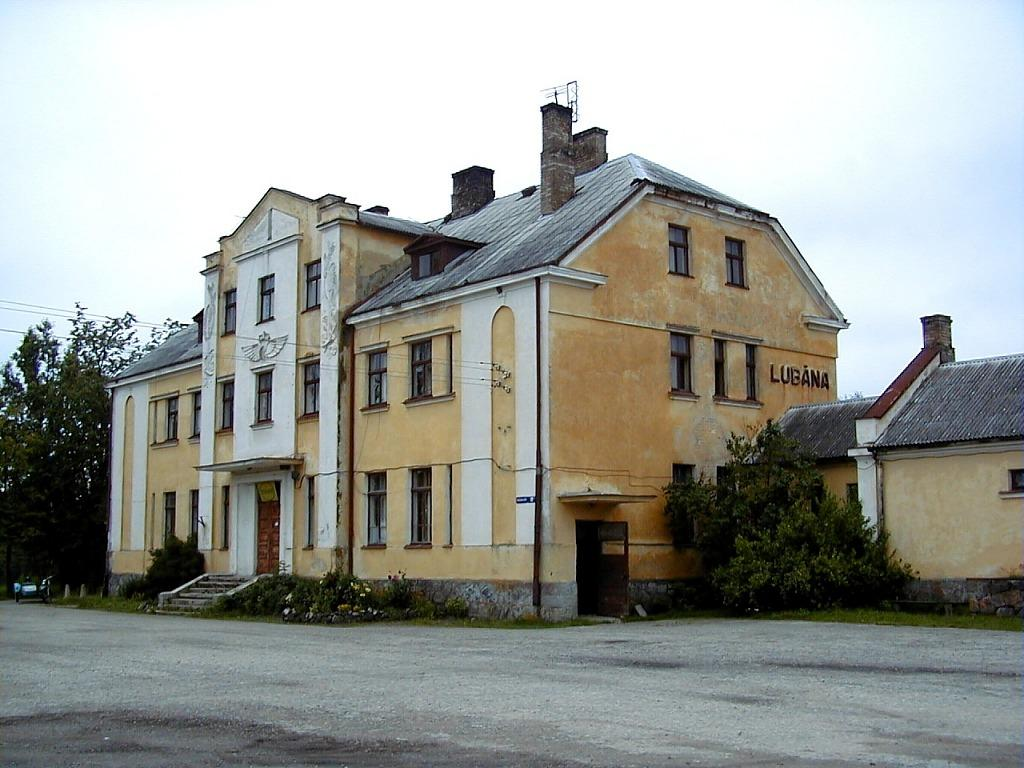
- Former railway station in Lubāna

- Flag Coat of arms

- Location in Latvia
- Coordinates: 56°54′N 26°43′E
- Country: Latvia
- Municipality: Madona Municipality
- First mentioned: 1455
- Town rights: 1992

Government
  - Chair of Lubāna Association Administration: Tālis Salenieks

Area
  - Total: 4.46 km^{2} (1.72 sq mi)
  - Land: 4.26 km^{2} (1.64 sq mi)
  - Water: 0.2 km^{2} (0.077 sq mi)

Population (2026)
  - Total: 1,410
  - Density: 331/km^{2} (857/sq mi)
- Time zone: UTC+2 (EET)
  - Summer (DST): UTC+3 (EEST)
- Postal code: LV-4830
- Calling code: +371 648
- Number of city council members: 7
- Website: http://www.lubana.lv/

Lubāna (German: Lubahn) is a town situated in Madona Municipality in the Vidzeme region of Latvia, situated by the Aiviekste river. It acquired a town status in 1992, and the current population is 1,453.

Lubāna has a Lutheran church (built 1868-1872, succeeded wooden churches built in 1648 and 1788) and a Catholic church, 1 nursery school and 1 secondary school.

Lubāna is also the administrative center of Indrāni Parish, but is located outside the borders of the parish.

== History ==
The first mention of the name Lubāna (German: Lubahn) comes from the Lubāna Medieval Castle which was mentioned not later than the year 1455. After its destruction in 1577 during the Livonian War, ruins remained, and by the 18th century the Lubāna Manor had been established nearby, around which the future town grew as a part of the Lubāna Kirchspiel (church parish). The owners of the manor include Heinrich von Kronstern, the Vietinghoff-Scheel and von Wolff Baltic German nobility families.

After the Latvian War of Independence, the manor was redistributed during the Latvian Land Reform of 1920 and the manor palace became the Lubāna Gymnasium (now - Lubāna Primary School). In 1935, the Madona–Lubāna railway line was completed, linking the town with Madona and Riga by rail until 2007, when the railway was dismantled. The village of Lubāna was a part of Lubāna Parish, created in 1866, which was a part of Cēsis county (until 1924) and of Madona county (1924–1949).

During World War II, the Wehrmacht took over the manor palace in 1941. The central buildings of the former manor were destroyed during the Soviet re-occupation of Latvia in 1944 when the vicinity of Lubāna was subjected to fierce fighting during the Madona Offensive. The cellars, a threshing barn and horse stables of the

After the restoration of Latvian independence in 1990, Lubāna received town rights in 1992, with the rest of the former Lubāna Parish becoming parts of Indrāni and Ošupe parishes within Madona district. Lubāna became the center of Lubāna Municipality in 2007 when the town and Indrāni Parish were merged into it, and Lubāna Municipality became a first-level subdivision after the 2009 Latvian administrative reform. In 2021, Lubāna Municipality was merged into Madona Municipality, with Lubāna and Indrāni Parish being locally administered by the Lubāna Association.

== Symbols ==
The coat of arms of Lubāna are a golden duck on a blue background in the top part and 3 waved lines (top part silver, bottom part blue) in the bottom part.

== Notable people ==
- Hugo Celmiņš, Prime Minister of Latvia (1924–1925, 1928–1931)
- Arnis Vīksna, medical historian
- Aira Birziņa, choir conductor and musical teacher
