= Chamber of Corporations =

A Chamber of Corporations is a key element in the idea of corporatism and could mean either:

- The Chamber of Fasces and Corporations was the lower chamber of the bicameral legislature of Italy between 1939 and 1943, replacing the popularly elected Chamber of Deputies.
- In Portugal during the Estado Novo regime, the upper chamber was dubbed Corporative Chamber.
- In Estonia, between 1924 and 1940, there were up to 17 Corporate chambers.
