= Lubāna Municipality =

Municipality of Latvia

Coordinates: 56°54′N 26°43′E

Lubāna Municipality Lubānas novads
- Municipality
- Flag Coat of arms

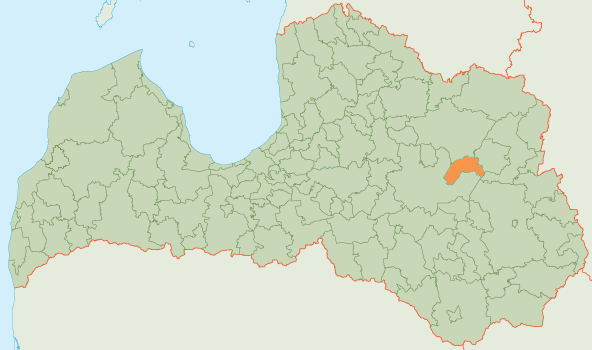
- Country: Latvia
- Formed: 2007
- Dissolved: 2021
- Centre: Lubāna

Government
  - Council Chair (last): Tālis Salenieks ("Our Home For Tomorrow")

Area
  - Total: 347.09 km^{2} (134.01 sq mi)
  - Land: 336.04 km^{2} (129.75 sq mi)
  - Water: 11.05 km^{2} (4.27 sq mi)

Population (2021)
  - Total: 2,163
  - Density: 6.437/km^{2} (16.67/sq mi)
- Website: www.lubana.lv

Lubāna Municipality (Latvian: Lubānas novads) was a municipality in Vidzeme, Latvia. The municipality was formed in 2007 by merging Indrāni Parish and Lubāna town, which were part of Madona district. The administrative centre was Lubāna.

It became a separate first-level municipality of Latvia after the 2009 administrative reform.

On 1 July 2021, Lubāna Municipality ceased to exist and its territory was merged into Madona Municipality.

== See also ==
- Lake Lubāns
