= Jānis Pauļuks =

Prime Minister of Latvia

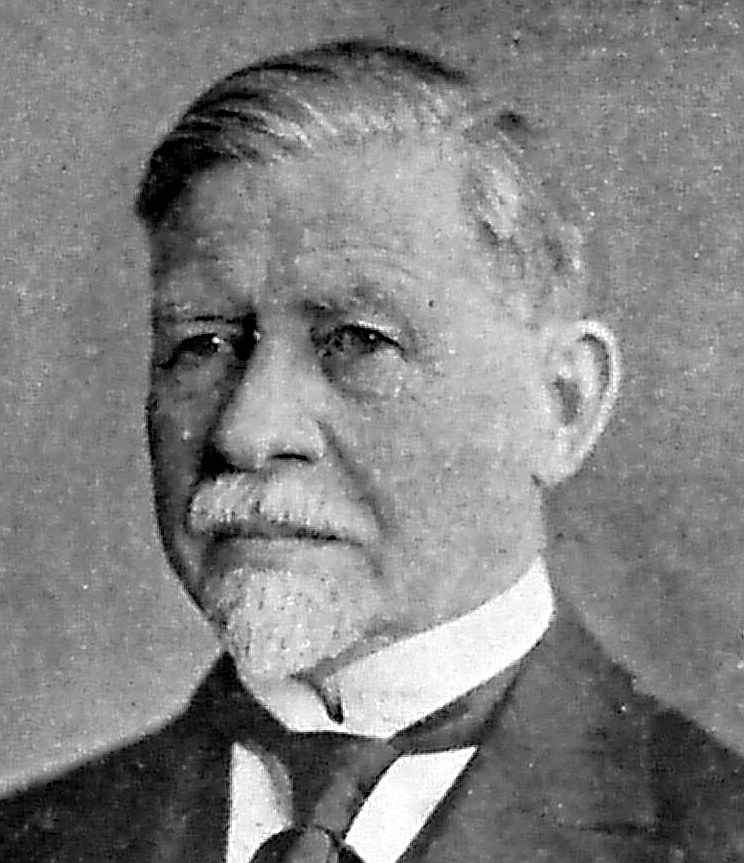

3rd Prime Minister of Latvia
- In office 27 January 1923 – 27 June 1923
- President: Jānis Čakste
- Preceded by: Zigfrīds Anna Meierovics
- Succeeded by: Zigfrīds Anna Meierovics

Personal details
- Born: 24 November 1865 Lielsesava Parish, Dobele County, Kurzeme Province, Latvia
- Died: 21 June 1937 (aged 71) Bauska, Latvia
- Party: Independent
- Relatives: Kārlis Pauļuks (brother)
- Education: Riga Technical University

Jānis Pauļuks (24 November 1865 – 21 June 1937) was a Latvian politician and public figure. He held the office as Prime Minister of Latvia from 27 January to 27 June 1923.

== Personal life ==
Pauļuks was born on a farm in Lielsesava Parish (now Sesava Parish) owned by his father. His education began with a neighbour's home teacher. He graduated from Švintė Parish School. Pauļuks continued his studies at Jelgava Real School for four years. Due to lack of resources, training had to be interrupted. He worked as a home teacher for a short time. In 1892 he entered Riga Polytechnic Institute, Faculty of Engineering, which was completed in 1892 with a commendation. Two summers between studies he was a trainee in railroad work. During his studies, he became active in the student corporation "Selonia" where he later became a philologist.

After graduation, he started work in the Jelgava Railway Technical Department in Riga. In 1894, he was invited to participate in the construction of the Western Siberian Railway. After completion of the railway, he became a technician on the Yekaterinburg - Chelyabinsk railway line. After a year of being a technician, he became an assistant to the distance manager, and after a year he became the superior. He then worked for the West Siberian Railway as the head of the backup department. In 1897, he joined the civil service and confirmed as head of unit on the West Siberian Railway. Later, he switched to the Central Siberian Railway, where he participated in the construction of the Trans-Baha'i Railway. 1906 . participated in the construction of a railway between Yekaterinburg and Perm . No.1909 . In 1920 he participated in the construction of railways in the North Caucasus as head of the building department until 1920. He returned to an independent Latvia, and in February, started working at the Latvian Railway Board. On 19 June 1921, Latvian Prime Minister Zigfrīds Anna Meierovics invited the non-partisan Pauļuks to become the Minister of Transport.

== Political career ==
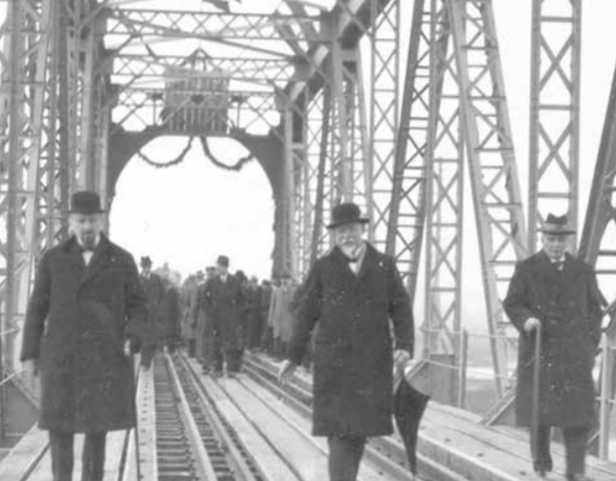
Pauļuks (center) at the reopening of the Julga Bridge in 1923.

With the election of the 1st Saeima on 7 and 8 October 1922, the powers of the Second Government of Meierovics approved by the Constitution had expired. First, President Jānis Čakste entrusted the formation of the government to the Social Democrats, who had the largest faction in the Saeima. After more than two months of talks, they failed to form a government, and on 25 January, chose to nominate a non-partisan technocrat, Pauļuks, who was not a member of the Saeima, as a compromise figure. On 25 January 1923, 65 MPs voted in favor of the Pauļuks government, with 19 abstentions.

The government coalition consisted of six parties, with Pauluk also serving as Minister of Transport. The main task of the government was to restore the economy and agriculture of the war-torn country. In social policy, the government set the following goals:

- further expand the law on sickness insurance;
- extending working time rationing to sectors not yet covered by law;
- revising and extending the laws, regulations and administrative provisions on the life, health and safety of workers, to include farm workers;
- reduce unemployment through intensive economic policies and organize public works for the needs of those who are idle;
- improve the financial situation of public employees.

== Later life and death ==
From 1926 to 1927, he became the chief inspector of the Ministry of Transport and a member of the Railway Board's newly built track council. In 1925, he was elected chairman of the board of the Latvian Central Bank of Agriculture. In 1934, he became an honorary doctor of engineering sciences at the University of Latvia. On 21 June 1937, Pauļuks died on his farm near Bauska. On 22 June, he was transported to the convention apartment of the student corporation Selonia, where he was bid farewell. He was later transferred to the Archbishop's Cathedral and buried on 25 June in Riga Forest Cemetery.

Political offices
Preceded by Zigfrīds Anna Meierovics	Prime Minister of Latvia; 27 January 1923 – 27 June 1923	Succeeded by Zigfrīds Anna Meierovics
