= Bērze (village) =

Village in Latvia

Coordinates: 56°41′N 23°26′E

Bērze is a village in the Bērze Parish of Dobele Municipality in the Semigallia region of Latvia, and the Zemgale Planning Region.
