= Krāslava district =

District of Latvia

Coordinates: 55°53′N 27°10′E

Krāslava
- District
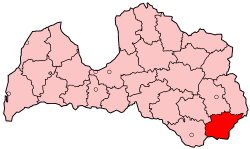
- Country: Latvia

Area
  - Total: 2,285 km^{2} (882 sq mi)

Population
  - Total: 36,836
  - Density: 16.12/km^{2} (41.75/sq mi)

Krāslava district (Latvian: Krāslavas rajons) was an administrative division of Latvia, located in Latgale region, in the country's east. It was organized into two cities and twenty three parishes, each with a local government authority. The main city in the district was Krāslava.

The district was eliminated during the administrative-territorial reform in 2009, most of its part being divided between Dagda and Krāslava municipalities and three parishes in north-west joining Aglona Municipality.

== Cities, municipalities and parishes of Krāslava district ==
- Andrupene parish
- Andzeļi parish
- Asūne parish
- Auleja parish
- Bērziņi parish
- Dagda city
- Dagda parish
- Ezernieki parish
- Grāveri parish
- Indra parish
- Izvalta parish
- Kalnieši parish
- Kaplava parish
- Kastuļina parish
- Kombuļi parish
- Konstantinova parish
- Krāslava city
- Krāslava parish
- Ķepova parish
- Piedruja parish
- Robežnieki parish
- Skaista parish
- Svariņi parish
- Šķaune parish
- Šķeltova parish
- Ūdrīši parish

In 2001, the two were amalgamated into Krāslava Municipality (a unit of local government within the two-tier Krāslava district).
