= Dagda Municipality =

Former municipality of Latvia

Coordinates: 56.1°N 27.6167°E

Dagda Municipality Dagdas novads
- Former municipality
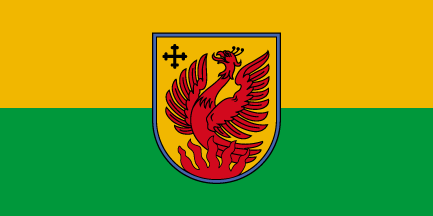
- Flag Coat of arms

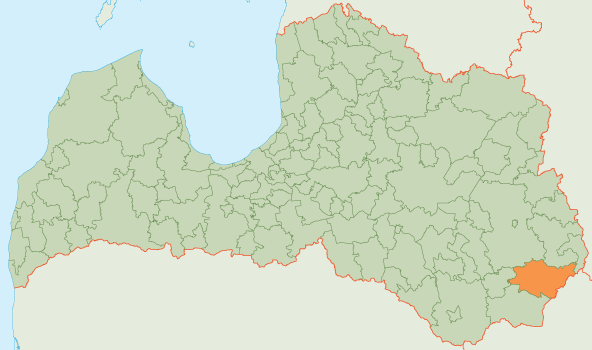
- Country: Latvia
- Formed: 1 July 2009
- Dissolved: 1 July 2021
- Centre: Dagda

Government
  - Council Chair (last): Aivars Trūlis (LRA)

Area
  - Total: 949.25 km^{2} (366.51 sq mi)
  - Land: 907.02 km^{2} (350.20 sq mi)
  - Water: 42.23 km^{2} (16.31 sq mi)

Population (2021)
  - Total: 6,475
  - Density: 7.139/km^{2} (18.49/sq mi)
- Website: www.dagda.lv

Dagda Municipality (Latvian: Dagdas novads) is a former municipality in Latgale, Latvia. The municipality was formed in 2009 by merging Andrupene parish, Andzeļi parish, Asūne parish, Bērziņi parish, Dagda parish, Ezernieki parish, Konstantinova parish, Ķepova parish, Svariņi parish, Šķaune parish and Dagda town, the administrative centre being Dagda. As of 2020, the population was 6,549.

On 1 July 2021, Dagda Municipality ceased to exist and its territory was merged into Krāslava Municipality.

== See also ==
- Administrative divisions of Latvia (2009)
