= Grāveri Parish =

Parish in Krāslava Municipality, Latvia

- parish of Latvia
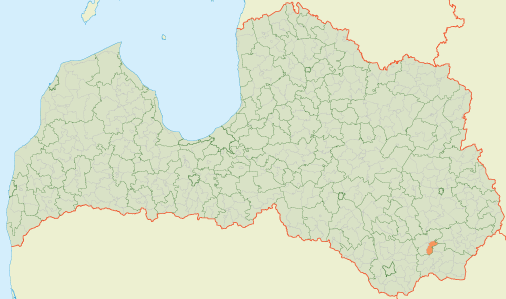
- 56°03′30″N 27°09′17″E
- Country: Latvia

Area
  - Total: 65.39 km^{2} (25.25 sq mi)
  - Land: 59.98 km^{2} (23.16 sq mi)
  - Water: 5.41 km^{2} (2.09 sq mi)

Population (1 January 2026)
  - Total: 315
  - Density: 5.25/km^{2} (13.6/sq mi)

Grāveri Parish (Latvian: Grāveru pagasts) is an administrative unit of Krāslava Municipality. As of 2013, it has a population of 552 and an area of 65.3 km^{2}. Until 2009, it was a part of the Krāslava district.

It borders the parishes of Auleja, Andrupene, Kastuļina, Kombuļi, Izvalta and Šķeltova in its own municipality, as well as Aglona Parish in Preiļi Municipality.

Its administrative centre and the largest village is Grāveri, which had a population of 203 in 2009.

The parish originates from the Grāveri village council, formed in Auleja Parish (initially named Grāveri Parish from 1866 to 1925), Daugavpils County in 1945 during the Soviet occupation of Latvia, which was then split away by 1990. From 1990 to 2009 the parish was a part of Krāslava district, from 2009 until 2021 – the former Aglona Municipality.
