= Konstantinova Parish =

Parish of Latvia

- parish of Latvia
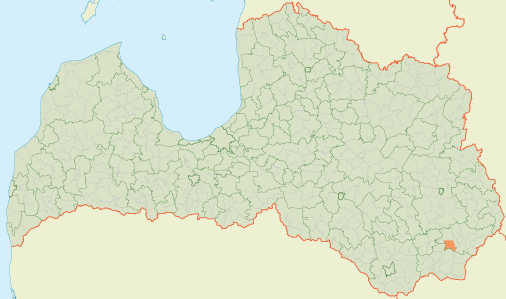
- Coordinates: 56°04′08″N 27°25′45″E
- Country: Latvia

Population (1 January 2026)
  - Total: 356

Konstantinova Parish (Latvian: Konstantinovas pagasts) is an administrative unit of Krāslava Municipality in the Latgale region of Latvia. It borders the parishes of Andrupene, Dagda, Asūne, Robežnieki, Skaista and Auleja, all in Krāslava Municipality.
