= Chertok =

Chertok is a Russian-language surname iterslly meaning "little devil". Notable people with the surname include:

- Benson T. Chertok (1935–1981), American physicist
- Boris Chertok (1912–2011), Russian rocket designer
- Jack Chertok (1906–1995), American film and television producer
- Léon Chertok (1911–1991), French psychiatrist and hypnotist
- Moshe Chertok
- Pearl Chertok (1918–1981), American harpist

== See also ==
- 6358 Chertok, an asteroid
- Chartok, Belarus, a village
- Čertoks, Latvia, a lake
