= Krāslava Parish =

Parish in Krāslava Municipality, Latvia

- parish of Latvia
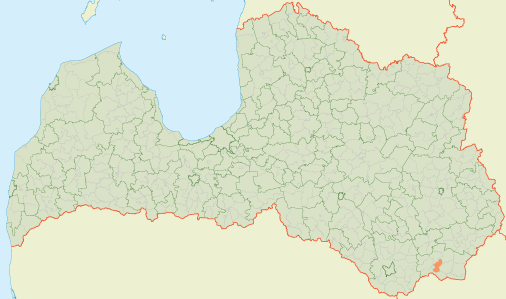
- Coordinates: 55°54′21″N 27°14′13″E
- Country: Latvia

Population (1 January 2026)
  - Total: 398
- Time zone: Eastern European Time

Krāslava Parish is an administrative unit of Krāslava Municipality, Latvia. The administrative center is the village of Ezerkalns.

Located on the right bank of the Daugava River, it borders the town of Krāslava in its own region and the parishes of Ūdrīši, Kombuļi, Skaista, and Kalnieši, and along the Daugava River with Kaplava parish.
