= Dagda (disambiguation) =

The Dagda is an important god of Irish mythology.

Dagda can also refer to:

- Dagda, Latvia, a city in eastern Latvia
- Dagda Municipality, Latvia
- Dagda parish, Latvia
