= Asūne Parish =

Parish in Krāslava Municipality, Latvia

- parish of Latvia
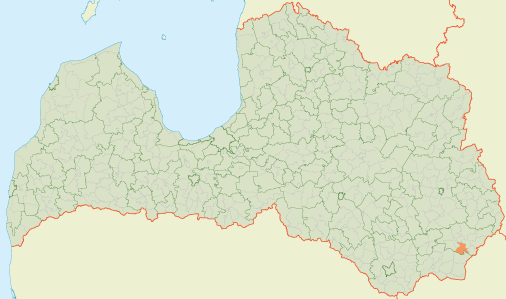
- 56°02′02″N 27°35′53″E
- Country: Latvia

Area
  - Total: 70.71 km^{2} (27.30 sq mi)
  - Land: 70.71 km^{2} (27.30 sq mi)
  - Water: 7.3 km^{2} (2.8 sq mi)

Population (1 January 2024)
  - Total: 356
  - Density: 5.0/km^{2} (13/sq mi)

Asūne Parish (Latvian: Asūnes pagasts) is an administrative unit of Krāslava Municipality in the Latgale region of Latvia. The administrative center is the village of Asūne.

It borders the parishes of Ķepova, Svariņi, Dagda, Konstantinova, and Robežnieki within its own municipality, and across Lake Dagda with the town of Dagda.
