= Vecborne Manor =

Manor house in Latvia

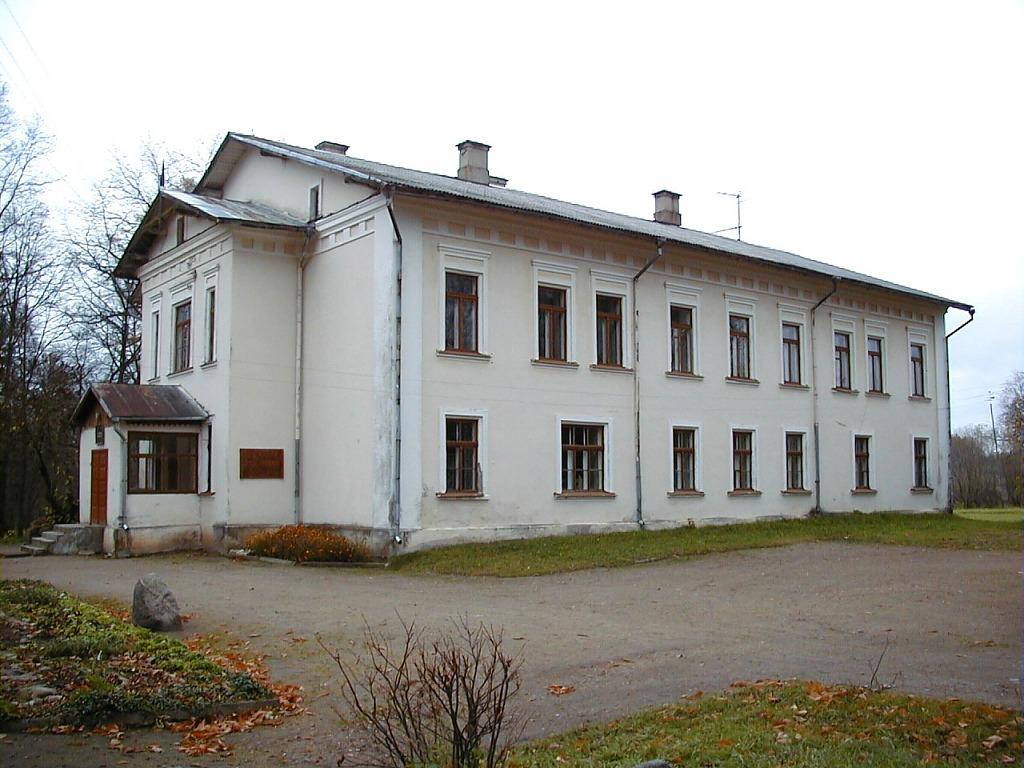

- Location within Latvia

General information
- Architectural style: Neoclassicism
- Location: Kaplava parish, Krāslava municipality, Latvia
- Coordinates: 55°51′41.8″N 27°00′32.2″E
- Completed: 1880s
- Client: von Engelhardt family

Vecborne Manor (Latvian: Vecbornes muiža German: Alt - Born) is a manor house in Kaplava parish, Krāslava municipality in the historical region of Selonia, in eastern Latvia.

Vecborne manor and the nearby lands had been owned by the von Engelhardt family since the 17th century. The current manor house was built in 1880s in simple classical forms. During the Latvian agrarian reforms in 1920, the manor house was nationalized and lands partitioned into 29 new farms. The manor building became the local primary school until the 1990s when it was closed. Since then, the manor building has been abandoned.

== See also ==
- List of palaces and manor houses in Latvia
