= Skaista Parish =

Parish of Latvia

- parish of Latvia
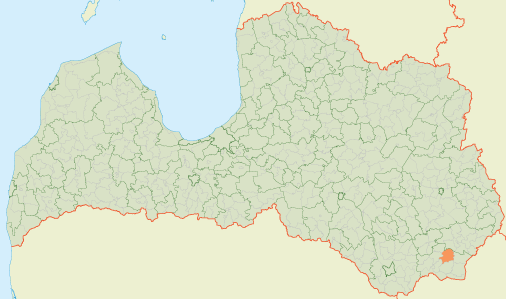
- 55°59′00″N 27°23′14″E
- Country: Latvia

Area
  - Total: 96.71 km^{2} (37.34 sq mi)
  - Land: 96.71 km^{2} (37.34 sq mi)
  - Water: 20.49 km^{2} (7.91 sq mi)

Population (1 January 2024)
  - Total: 470
  - Density: 4.9/km^{2} (13/sq mi)

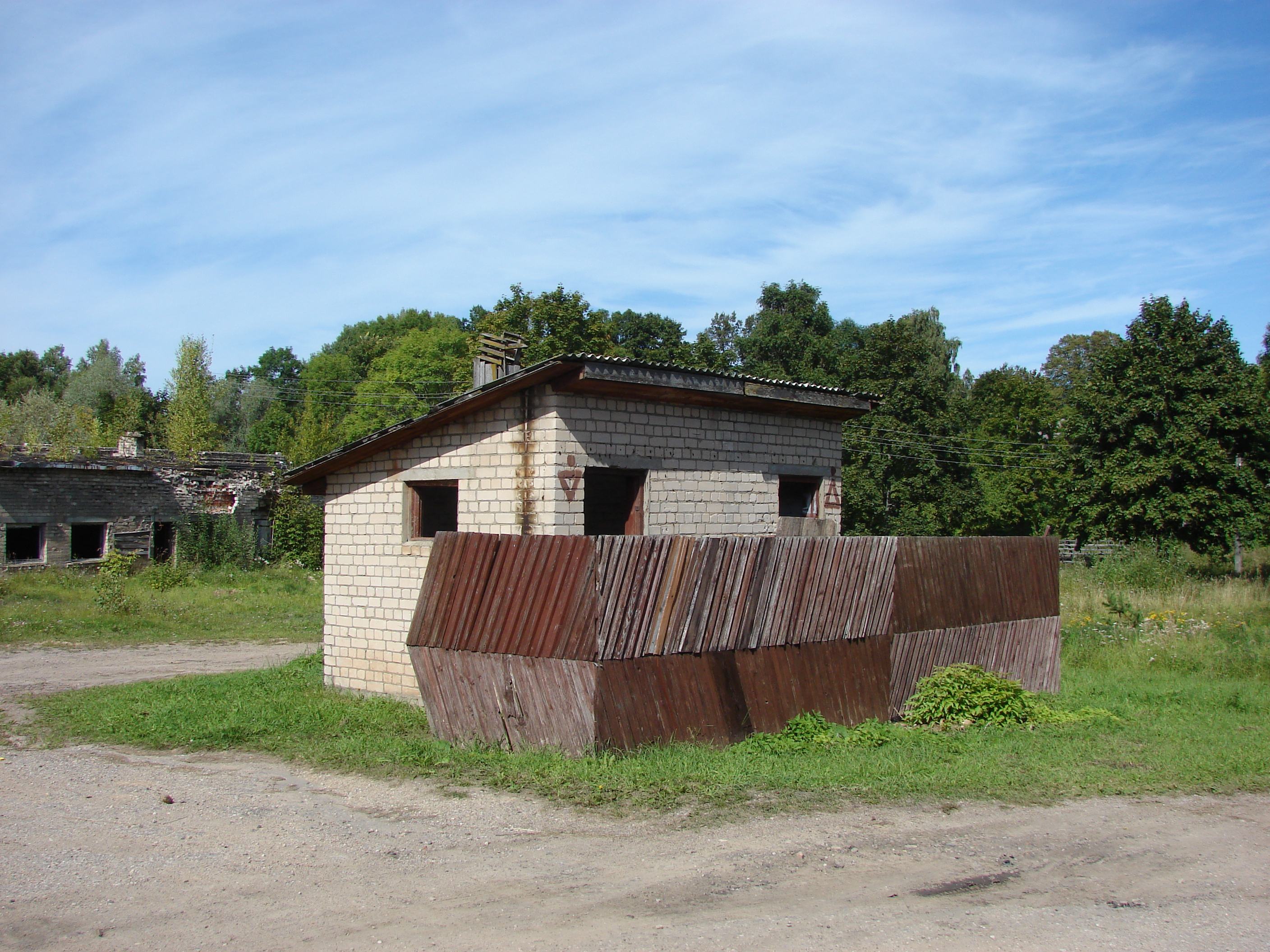
Near the community of Skaista

Skaista Parish (Latvian: Skaistas pagasts, Latgalian: Skaista pogosts) is an administrative unit of Krāslava Municipality, Latvia. It borders the parishes of Auleja, Kombuļi, Krāslava, Kalnieši, Robežnieki and Konstantinova.
