= Old Believers Church in Foļvarka =

Church in Krāslava Municipality, Latvia

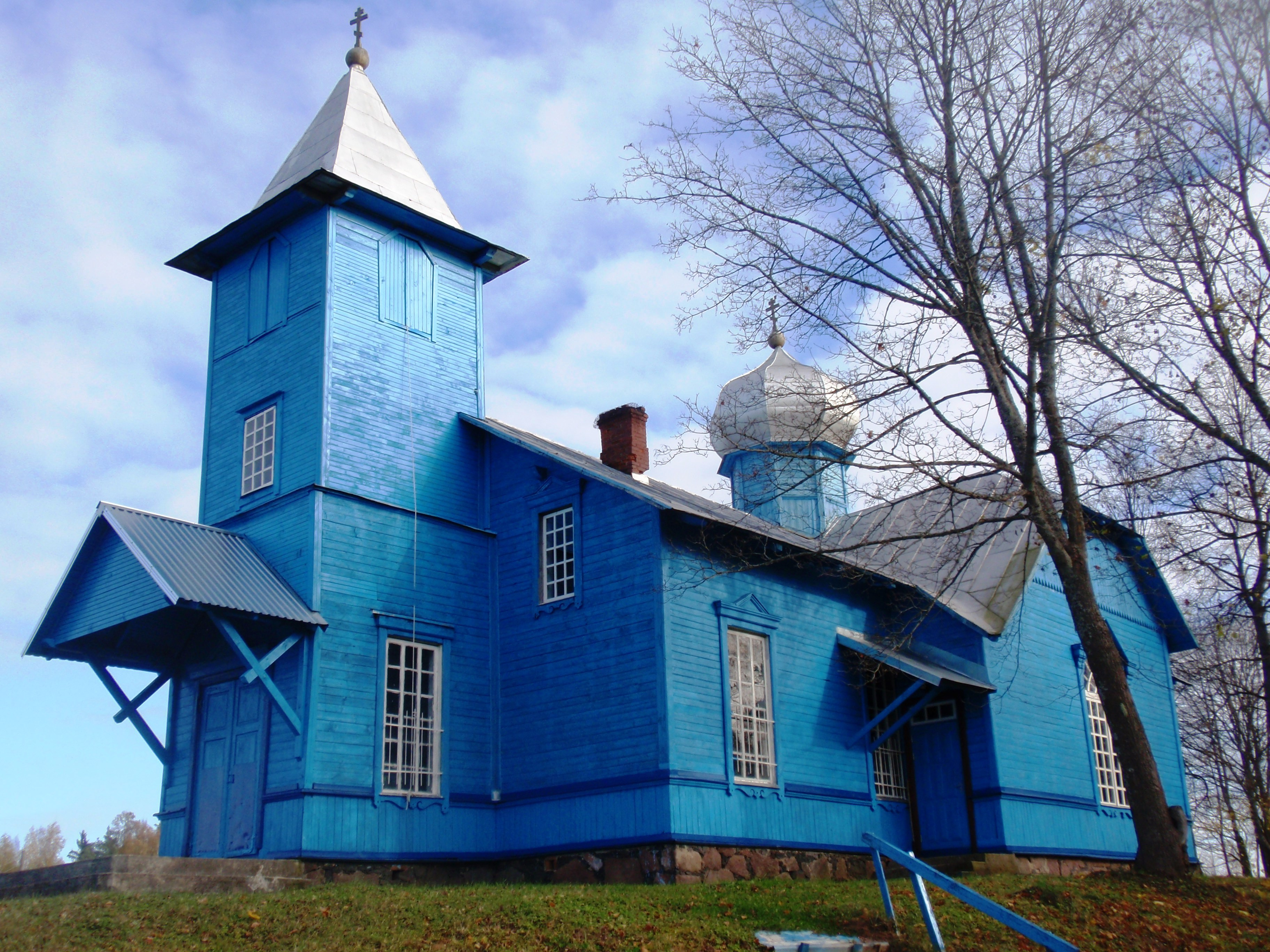
- Church in 2011

Religion
- Affiliation: Pomorian Old-Orthodox Church

Location
- Location: Foļvarka, Latvia
- Interactive map of Old Believers Church in Foļvarka

Architecture
- Style: Russian Revival
- Completed: 1910

Old Believers Church in Foļvarka (Latvian: Foļvarkas vecticībnieku kopienas lūgšanu nams) is an Old Believers place of worship in Foļvarka, in the Kastuļina Parish of Krāslava Municipality, in the Latgale region of Latvia.

Its building began in 1894 and the church was incepted in 1910. During the World War II, Germans wanted to take down the church bell, but locals prevented it by giving away their money and jewelry. In the 1970s, Foļvarka church was robbed several times and from the 162 icons there is left only one. Since 2013, the church is one of the national architectural monuments of Latvia.
