= Svariņi Parish =

Parish of Latvia

- parish of Latvia
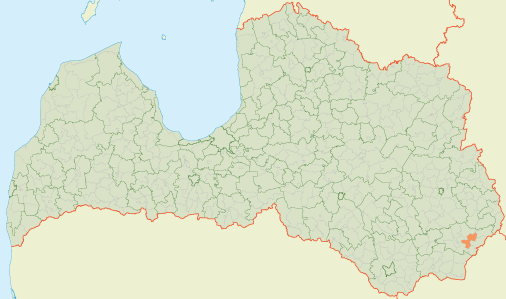
- 56°06′10″N 27°43′11″E

- Location within Latvia
- Country: Latvia

Area
  - Total: 92 km^{2} (36 sq mi)
  - Land: 90.03 km^{2} (34.76 sq mi)
  - Water: 1.97 km^{2} (0.76 sq mi)

Population (1 January 2026)
  - Total: 207
  - Density: 2.30/km^{2} (5.95/sq mi)

Svariņi Parish (Latvian: Svariņu pagasts) is an administrative unit of Krāslava Municipality in the Latgale region of Latvia. It borders the Dagda, Ezernieki, Šķaune, Bērziņš, Ķepova and Asūne parishes.
