= Čertoks =

Lake in Šķeltova Parish, Latvia

Coordinates: 56°05′02″N 27°07′00″E

File:Čortoks (Velnezers).JPG Čertoks (also Velnezers , Čortoks ; Latgalian : Valna azars) is a suffusion lake in Šķeltova Parish , Krāslava Municipality, Latvia. It is located between Lake Jazinks and the P62 road 3 km northwest of Grāveri, Krāslava Municipality. The lake is located in a funnel-shaped depression, the banks are steep, in places flat. The transparency of the lake in its middle is about 8 meters. No river or spring flows into or out of it. Since 1977, the lake with the surrounding landscape has been a nature reserve. The lake is a popular tourist attraction. Swimming in the lake is prohibited in order to preserve the unique clear water environment. The water of Čertoks does not have a large diversity of aquatic animals and aquatic plants.

The names Čertoks/Čortoks come from the Rssian name Chertok of the lake, which literally eans "little devil", while names Velnezers and Valna azars literally mean "Devil's lake", from velns in Latvian mythology.
