= Apolonija Laurinoviča =

Latvian physician and politician

Member of the Constitutional Assembly
- In office 1920–1922

Personal details
- Born: 2 August 1886 Andrupene Parish, Russian Empire
- Died: 11 July 1967 (aged 80) Los Angeles, United States

Apolonija Laurinoviča (2 August 1886 – 11 July 1967) was a Latvian physician and politician. In 1920 she was one of the six women elected to the Constitutional Assembly, Latvia's first female parliamentarians.

== Biography ==
Laurinoviča was born in Andrupene Parish in 1886. She worked as a primary school teacher in Saint Petersburg from 1905 until 1917. During World War I she taught at a gymnasium and was involved with the Latgalian Refugee Relief Society. Between 1917 and 1918 she was a member of the Latgale Provisional Land Council. She was a Latgalian Farmers Party candidate in the 1920 Constitutional Assembly elections. and was one of the members elected (alongside her brother Jezups), serving in the Assembly until 1922.

Between 1924 and 1927, Laurinoviča worked as a doctor at Daugavpils Hospital. She lectured in anatomy and physiology at the Daugavpils Teachers' Institute from 1924 until 1940, and served as the director of the Daugavpils Kalkūnai Children's Home from 1926 to 1938. She also worked in the editorial office of the Latgolas Škola magazine. During World War II she went into exile, and died in Los Angeles in the United States in 1967.
