= Ķepova Parish =

Parish of Latvia

- parish of Latvia
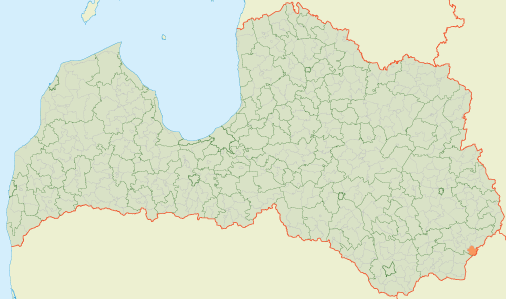
- Coordinates: 56°01′00″N 27°45′00″E
- Country: Latvia

Population (1 January 2026)
  - Total: 114
- Time zone: Eastern European Time

Ķepova Parish (Latvian: Ķepovas pagasts) unit of Krāslava Municipality in the Latgale region of Latvia.

The parish is on Latvia's border with Belarus. It borders the parishes of Asūne, Svariņi, Bērziņi and Robežnieki within its own municipality.
