= 1927 Latvian presidential election =

← 1925	April 5, 7–8, 1927	1930 →
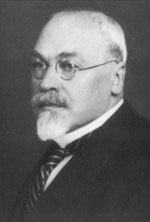
Nominee	Gustavs Zemgals
Party	Democratic Centre
Electoral vote	73
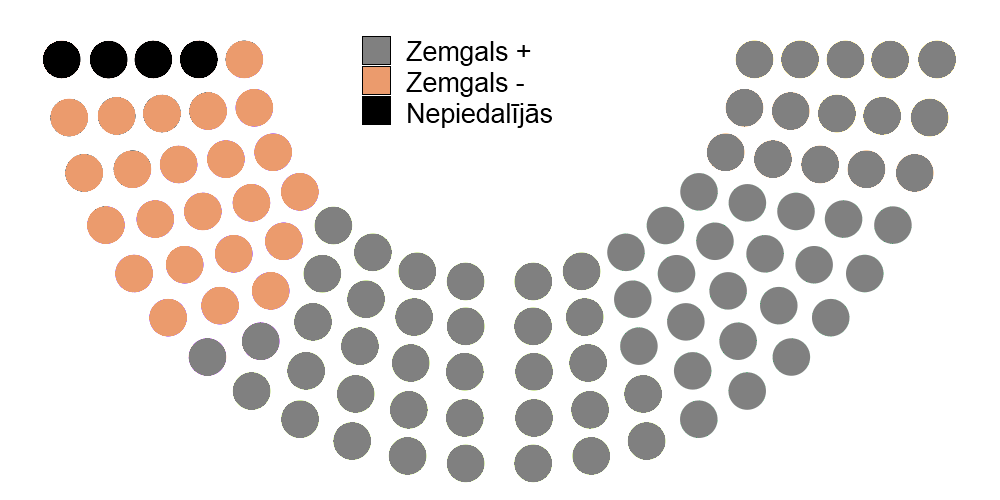
- Votes by MPs
President before election
Pauls Kalniņš
Latvian Social Democratic Workers' Party
Elected President
Gustavs Zemgals
Democratic Centre

The 1927 presidential elections in Latvia took place in April 5, 7, and 8, 1927, during the term of the 2nd Saeima. The elections took place in extraordinary circumstances, as the former President of Latvia, Jānis Čakste, had died while holding the office of President. The election of the president this time proved to be very difficult as only after nine unsuccessful votes in three Saeima sittings for the 2nd President of Latvia was Gustavs Zemgals elected.

== Candidates ==
Candidate	Party
Gustavs Zemgals	Democratic Centre
Voldemārs Zāmuēls	Democratic Centre
Frīdrihs Vesmanis	LSDSP
Pēteris Juraševskis	LSDSP
Alberts Kviesis	Latvian Farmers' Union

== Election process and results ==
The presidential election took place in extraordinary circumstances after the death of the former President of Latvia, Jānis Čakste, on March 14, 1927. In the first vote for the president, the Latvian Farmers' Union nominated Alberts Kviesis, and with the Latvian Social Democratic Workers' Party nominating former Minister of Justice and Home Affairs Pēteris Juraševskis. As both candidates do not get the required number of votes, in the second vote, former Prime Minister Voldemārs Zāmuēls was nominated in place of Juraševskis as he did not represent any party, but it does not change anything in the results either. In the third vote, Zāmuēls was replaced by Latvian Ambassador to London Frīdrihs Vesmanis, again without any results.

The elections continued at the next sitting of the Saeima on April 7, with Kviesis and Vesmanis, led by the Social Democrats, got the same result of 44 votes each. Speaker of the Saeima and acting president Pauls Kalniņš and poet Rainis were discussed as candidates.

As no candidate is elected in several more rounds of voting, Arveds Bergs, a deputy of the National Union, proposed amendments to the Constitution of Latvia on April 8, transferring the right to elect the President to the people. Although Bergs's proposal was rejected, Gustavs Zemgals, the former vice-president of the People's Council, had agreed to run for president at Fēlikss Cielēns's suggestion to save the coalition from running out of candidates. As a result, Gustavs Zemgals is elected with 73 votes in favor.

Candidate	Party	Votes	%
Gustavs Zemgals	Democratic Centre	73	76.04
Against		23	23.96
Total		96	100.00
