= Patarnieki =

Village in Latvia

- Village
- Location of Patarnieki
- Coordinates: 55°48′58″N 27°35′24″E
- Municipality: Krāslava Municipality
- Parish: Piedruja Parish
- Time zone: UTC+2 (EET)
  - Summer (DST): UTC+3

Patarnieki is a village in the Piedruja Parish of Krāslava Municipality in the Latgale region of Latvia, near the country's border with Belarus.

== See also ==
- List of cities and towns in Latvia
