= Ieva Raubiško =

Latvian human rights activist (born 1974)

- Born: December 18, 1974 (age 51)
- Citizenship: Latvia
- Education: University of Oxford
- Occupation: Anthropologist
- Organization: Gribu palīdzēt bēgļiem
- Criminal charges: Organising intentional illegal crossing of the state border for a group of people
- Criminal penalty: Community service

Ieva Raubiško (born 18 December 1974) is a Latvian anthropologist and human rights activist, known for her advocacy for asylum seekers and refugees in Latvia.

== Biography ==
Raubiško studied social anthropology at university, and went on to obtain a PhD from the University of Oxford, with her dissertation focusing on post-war life in Chechnya.

Raubiško first started her activism during the 2015 European migrant crisis. She founded Humusa komanda, a Riga-based social enterprise producing cooking classes and Middle Eastern cuisine while employing refugees and asylum seekers.

Raubiško subsequently went on to volunteer for the non-governmental organisation Gribu palīdzēt bēgļiem (GPB; lit. 'I want to help refugees'), and from July 2021 focused primarily on migrants congregating at the Belarus–Latvia border. In 2022, Raubiško became a project coordinator and advocacy officer for GPB, though her role had reverted back to a voluntary one as of August 2024.

=== 2023 arrest and trial ===
On 31 December 2022, a group of five Syrian asylum seekers who had entered Latvia at its border with Belarus in Robežnieki Parish contacted the GPB for humanitarian assistance. Unable to reach the border due to the state of emergency declared by Latvian government due to the migrant crisis, Raubiško called for an ambulance due to members of the group requiring medical attention.

In January 2023, the same group contacted the GBP again, stating that they had been pushed back into Belarus by the State Border Guard several times. Raubiško submitted the case for an urgent review by the European Court of Human Rights requesting interim measures be put in place to prevent the group's deportation; the ECHR granted the measures on 11 January, ordering Latvian authorities to provide basic humanitarian assistance to the group.

On 12 January 2023, Raubiško and Egils Grasmanis, also of the GBP, visited the border zone to ensure the State Border Guard was adhering to the EHCR's ruling. Raubiško and Grasmanis were subsequently detained by the Criminal Investigative Service of the State Border Guard and were told they would face criminal charges, with the case being transferred to investigators in Riga.

In December 2023, Raubiško was officially charged with "organising intentional illegal crossing of the state border for a group of people", under articles 20 and 284/2 of the Latvian criminal code due to her actions concerning the group of five Syrian asylum seekers in Robežnieki. The charges against Grasmanis were dismissed.

Raubiško's first hearing was held on 28 February 2024 at the Latgale Regional Court in Rēzekne. By 19 August 2024, eight separate court hearings had been held concerning the case. At a court appearance on 22 August 2024, Raubiško stated all she had done was "help the group to stay alive" and dismissed the prosecution's argument that she had provided them with "instructions" on seeking asylum in Latvia, stating she had given them "advice and information", stating that helping asylum seekers was not a crime. She pleaded not guilty. The prosecution argued that Raubiško had instructed the group to cross the border from Belarus into Latvia in order for them to come under Latvian jurisdiction so that she could submit an application to the ECHR, describing the case she put forward as containing "deliberately false information". The prosecutor requested a 1.5 year prison sentence for Raubiško.

The final hearing for Raubiško has been postponed on at least four occasions in October 2024 and March 2025. On 12 March 2025, the judge stated information from the Citizenship and Migration Board and the State Border Guard was "incomplete". The final hearing is currently scheduled for 19 August 2025.

On 20 August 2025, the Latgale District Court found Raubiško guilty of supporting the intentional illegal crossing of the state border for a group of people and sentenced her to 200 hours of community service. The case against Raubiško was compared to the trial of the Hajnówka Five in Poland, which occurred at the same time; they were ultimately acquitted of all charges in September 2025.

=== Response ===
Front Line Defenders raised concerns that plans to sentence Raubiško were in order to deter people from providing assistance at the Latvia–Belarus border, as well as concerns about the impact the prolonged proceedings were having on Raubiško's wellbeing, noting that the rescheduled final hearing date of August 2025 meant she had been on trial for over 500 days.

The United Nations Special Rapporteurs on human rights, human rights defenders, and migrants rights stated Latvian authorities' investigation into Raubiško appeared to have been "initiated in direct response to their legitimate acts of solidarity with asylum seekers, undertaken with the sole aim of seeking to prevent human rights violations".

In 2024, the Latvian PEN General Assembly awarded the Latvian PEN Prize to Raubiško for her "courage and selfless work in defending the rights of asylum seekers".

The Helsinki Foundation for Human Rights expressed their "deep concern and unwavering support" for Raubiško.

The Latvian Centre for Human Rights stated that attempts to prosecute a human rights activist "cannot end well" and was not the "characteristic of lawful states".
