= Kombuļi Parish =

Parish of Latvia

- parish of Latvia
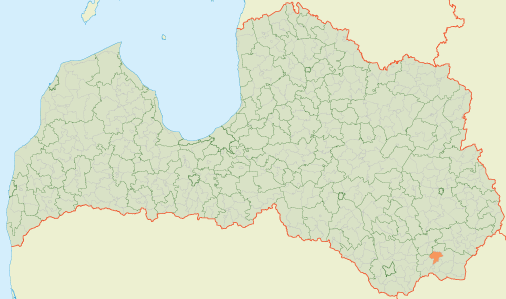
- 55°58′58″N 27°12′59″E
- Country: Latvia

Area
  - Total: 69.70 km^{2} (26.91 sq mi)
  - Land: 69.7 km^{2} (26.9 sq mi)
  - Water: 11.27 km^{2} (4.35 sq mi)

Population (1 January 2025)
  - Total: 412
  - Density: 5.91/km^{2} (15.3/sq mi)

Kombuļi Parish (Latvian: Kombuļu pagasts, Latgalian: Kumbuļa pogosts) is an administrative unit of Krāslava Municipality, Latvia. It borders the parishes of Izvalta, Ūdrīši, Krāslava, Skaista, Auleja and Grāveri.
