= Izvalta Parish =

Parish of Latvia

- parish of Latvia
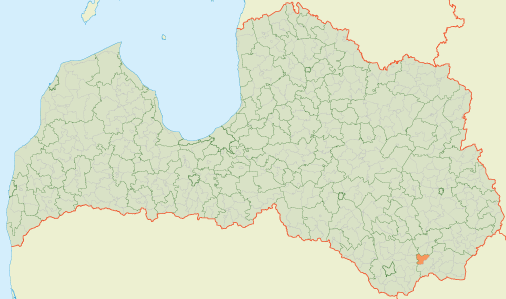
- 55°58′10″N 27°00′51″E
- Country: Latvia

Area
  - Total: 71.44 km^{2} (27.58 sq mi)
  - Land: 69.91 km^{2} (26.99 sq mi)
  - Water: 1.53 km^{2} (0.59 sq mi)

Population (1 January 2026)
  - Total: 436
  - Density: 6.24/km^{2} (16.2/sq mi)
- Website: www.izvalta.lv

Izvalta Parish (Latvian: Izvaltas pagasts, Latgalian: Izvolta pogosts) is an administrative unit of Krāslava Municipality, Latvia.

It borders the Ūdrīši, Kombuļi, Grāveri and Šķeltova parishes of its own municipality and the Ambeļi, Biķernieki and Naujene parishes of Augšdaugava Municipality.
