= Bērziņi Parish =

Parish of Latvia

- parish of Latvia
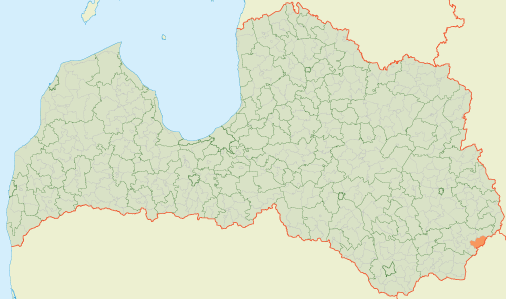
- Coordinates: 56°04′57″N 27°50′44″E
- Country: Latvia

Population (1 January 2026)
  - Total: 254

Berzini Parish (Latvian: Bērziņu pagasts) is an administrative unit of Krāslava Municipality in the Latgale region of Latvia.

The parish borders Belarus along the Čaušica and Sarjanka rivers, as well as with Ķepova, Svariņi and Šķaune parishes.
