= Białowieża National Park =

National park in Poland

- Polish: Białowieski Park Narodowy
- IUCN category II (national park)
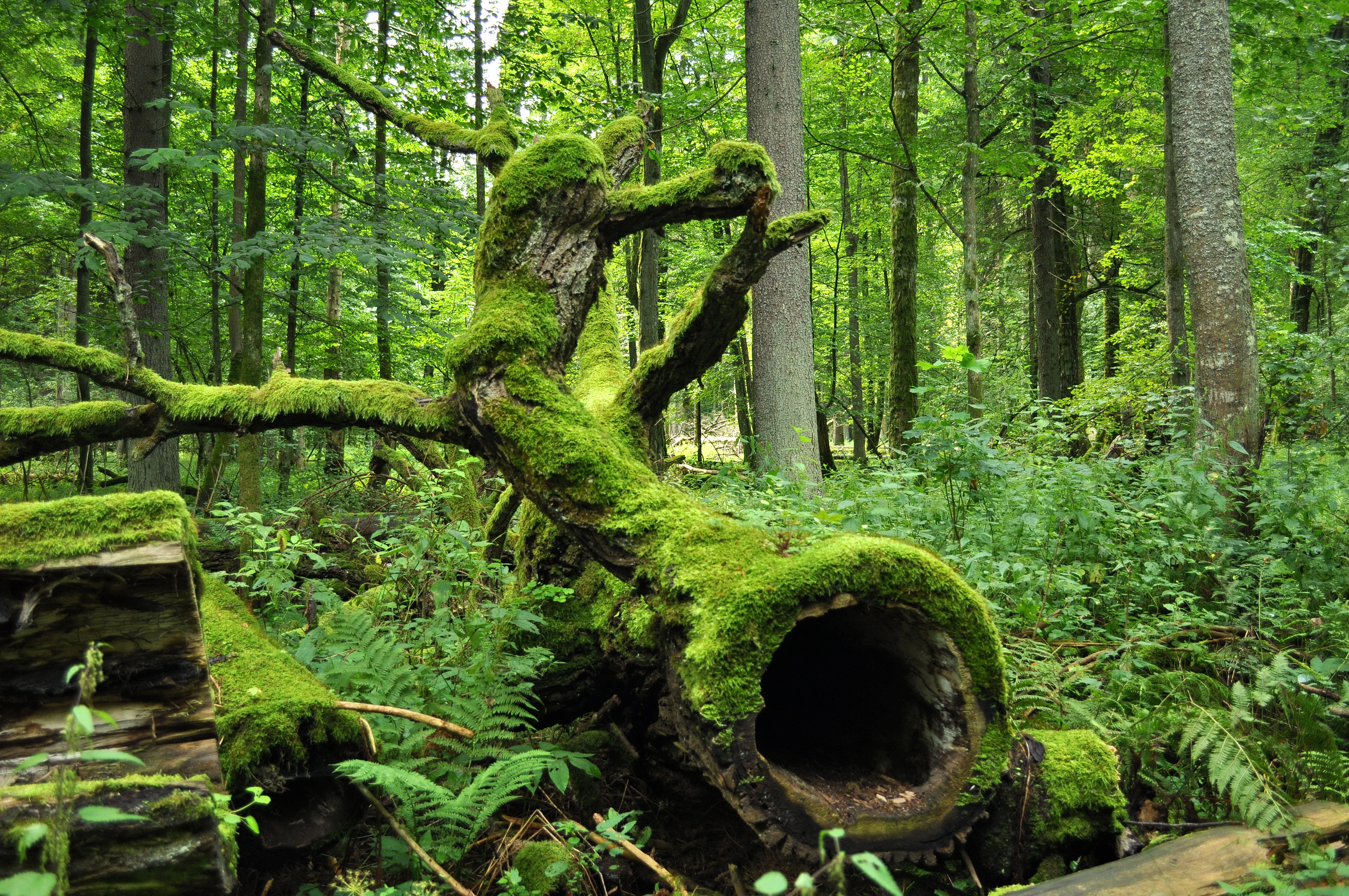
- Fallen tree in the Białowieża Forest Park logo with European bison

- Location within Poland
- Location: Podlaskie Voivodeship in Poland
- Nearest city: Hajnówka
- Coordinates: 52°45′7.66″N 23°52′44.86″E
- Area: 105.2 km^{2} (40.6 sq mi)
- Established: 11 August 1932
- Visitors: 140000 (in 2005)
- Governing body: Ministry of the Environment
- Website: Official website

UNESCO World Heritage Site
- Part of: Białowieża Forest
- Criteria: Natural: (ix), (x)
- Reference: 33-001
- Inscription: 1979 (3rd Session)
- Extensions: 1992, 2004

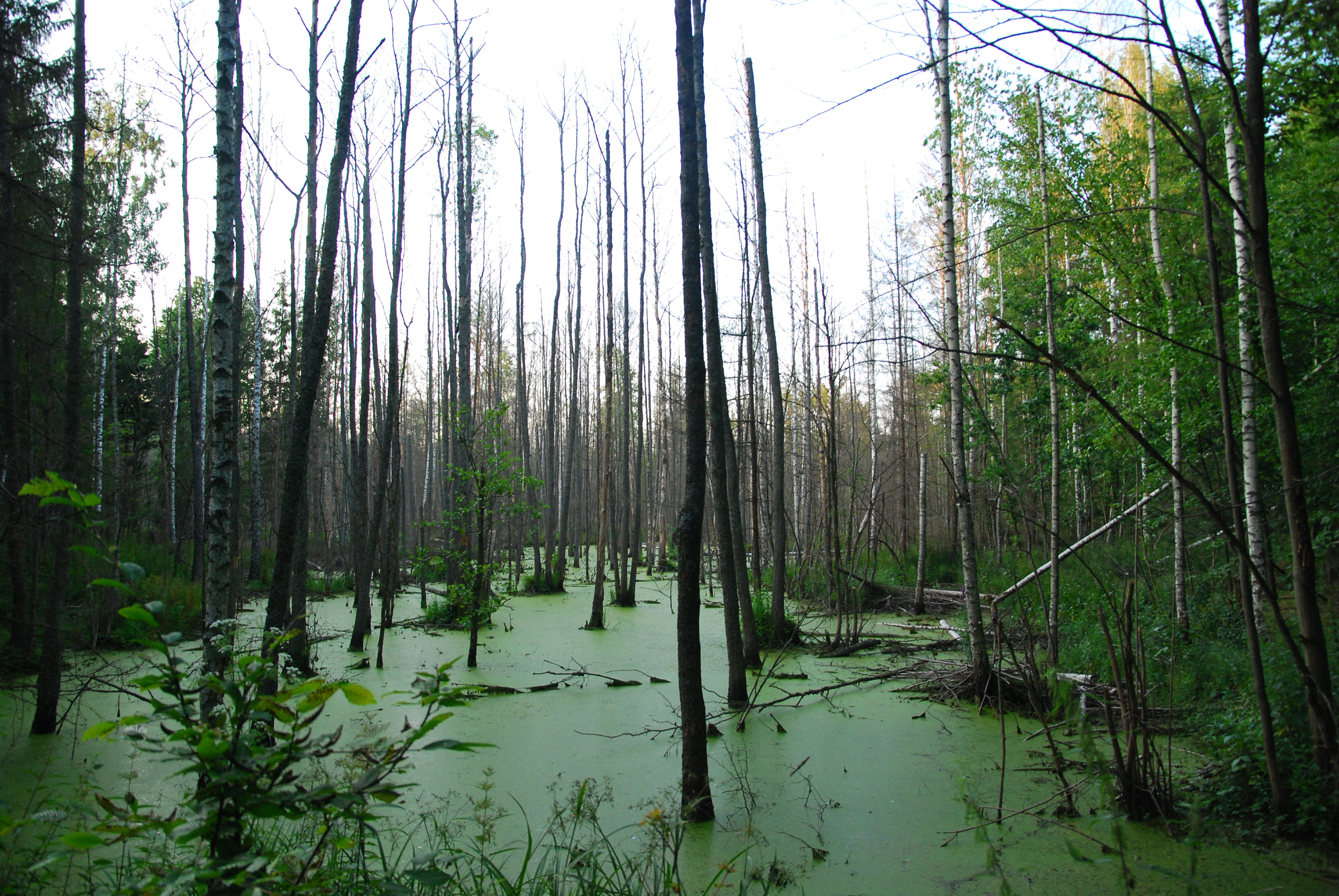

Białowieża National Park (Polish: Białowieski Park Narodowy) is a national park in Podlaskie Voivodeship, in Eastern Poland adjacent to the border with Belarus. The total area of the park is 105.2 square kilometres (40.6 sq mi). It is located 62 km (39 mi) southeast of Białystok (Poland). It is known for the protection of the best preserved part of the Białowieża Forest, Europe's last temperate primaeval forest fragment that once allegedly stretched across the European Plain. It is home to the world's largest population of European bison (Polish: żubr), the continent's heaviest land animal, as well as wild boar, Eurasian Elk, Eurasian wolf, and Eurasian lynx.

The border between the two countries runs through the forest, the Belovezhskaya Pushcha National Park is adjacent on the Belarus side of the border. There is a border crossing for hikers and cyclists within the forest. According to one study, the park brings in tourist revenues of about 72 million zloty per year.

The characteristic feature of the park is its biological diversity. Białowieża National Park is the only Polish natural property designated by UNESCO as a World Heritage Site. The park is the most important – central zone of Białowieża Forest Biosphere Reserve.

== History ==
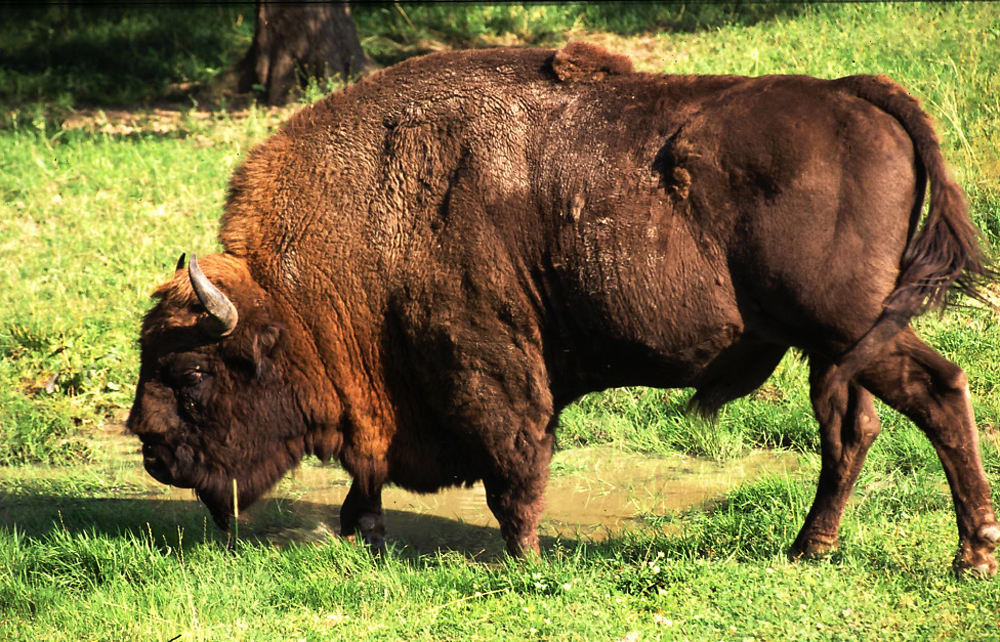
Vulnerable species, the European bison in Białowieża National Park

The park's formal beginning was the Forest Reserve inspectorate (Polish: Rezerwat) established in 1921. The inspectorate was transformed into the National Park in Białowieża on 11 August 1932 by the Second Polish Republic. After World War II, the forest was divided between the People's Republic of Poland and the Belarusian SSR of the Soviet Union. The People's Republic of Poland reopened the Białowieża National Park in 1947.

The park headquarters is in Białowieża. Currently, the park consists of three administrative units: The Protective Orłówka Precinct, the Conservation District Hwoźna and the Bison Breeding Centre (with three reserves, breeding and demonstration Bison Reserve).

Since the migrant crisis in Europe, groups of migrants have resided and hidden in the forest, having crossed the border with Belarus. In 2025, a trial took place of five activists, including Białowieża National Park worker Ewa Moroz-Keczynska, on charges of assisting the migrants. The group became known as the Hajnówka Five.

=== Orłówka ===
The Orłówka Protective Unit has an area of 5,073.21 hectares (12,536.2 acres), of which 4784.46 ha is under strict protection, 235.48 ha under active protection and 53.27 ha under landscape protection. The area is subdivided into two protective districts: Sierchanowo (2303,24 ha) and Dziedzinka (2769.97 ha).

=== Hwoźna ===
The Hwoźna Protective Unit has an area of 5169.50 ha, of which 941.64 ha is under strict protection, 4203.68 ha is under active protection, and 24.18 ha is under landscape protection. The area is subdivided into four protective districts: Cupryki (area of 1243.17 ha), Gruszki (area of 1426,52 ha), Masiewo (area of 1120.29 ha) and Zamosze (area of 1379.52 ha).

=== Bison Breeding Centre ===
The European bison Breeding Centre has an area of 274.56 ha which is under the landscape protection. The area comprises three breeding reserves, and the European bison Public Access Reserve. The responsibilities of the personnel of European bison Breeding Centre cover the bison's habitat in all of the Polish part of the Białowieża Forest.

The idea of creating a national park locally is about 200 years old. However, the genuine protection efforts which are being continued today are centuries older.

== Features ==
Often called the "last untouched wilderness of Europe", the Białowieża National Park is the only one of its kind among the 23 national parks of Poland. Its inner zone belongs to the realm of old-growth forest which has been living without much human intervention for almost 800 years. Only scientists can navigate the strictly protected area freely. Each group of tourists is limited to no more than 20 people, and the presence of an official guide is mandatory. A classic road tour leads through the southern part of the reserve area, totalling 4,747 hectares. Several official guides providing tours to individuals or small groups operate out of the neighboring village Białowieża, which offers a number of lodging options.

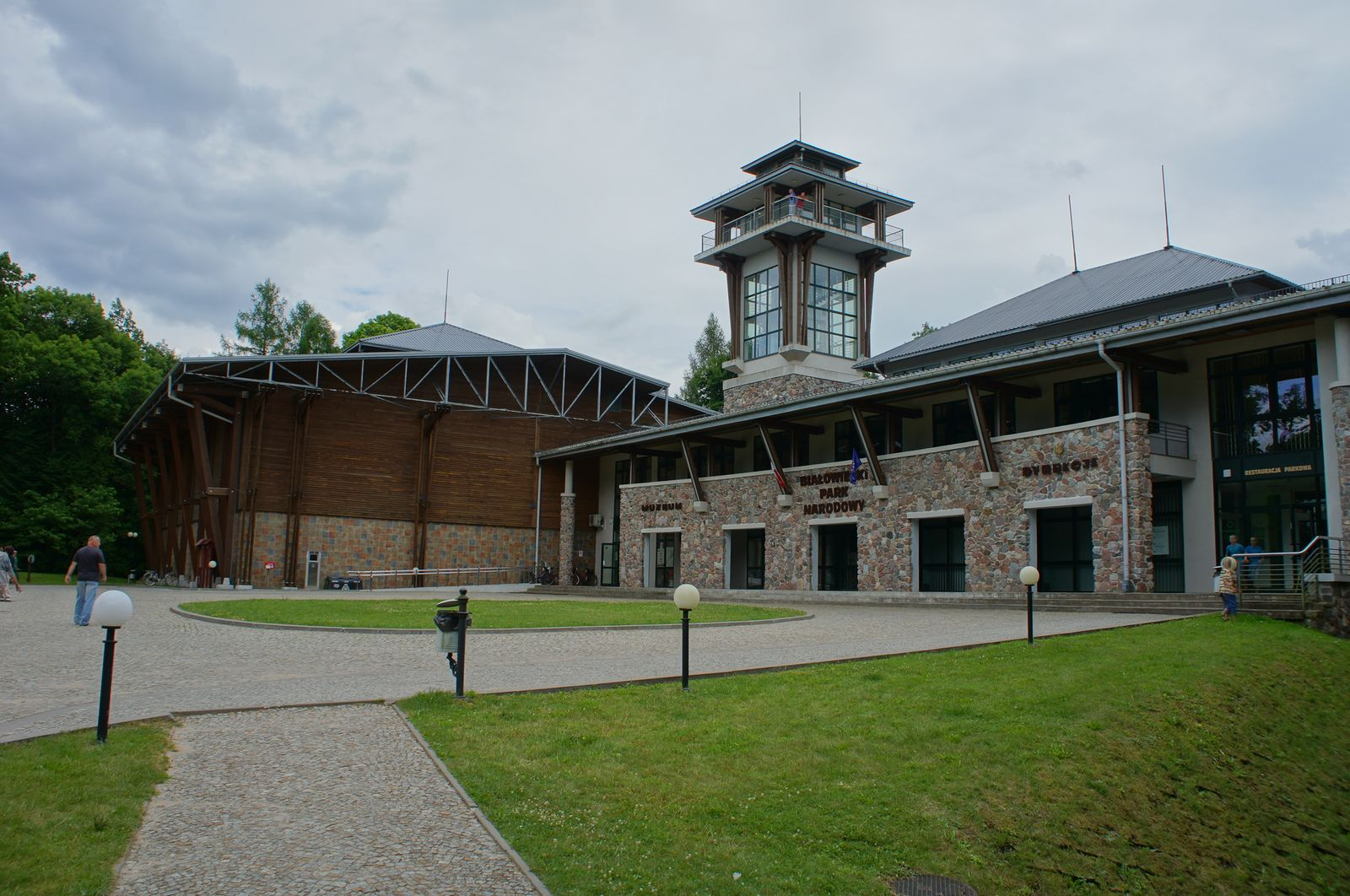
Museum of Nature and Forest of the Białowieża National Park

The headquarters are located at the Białowieża village in the Museum of Nature and Forest of the Białowieża National Park (pictured). The museum complex, built in the 1960s, occupies the place of the former palace of Polish King Augustus III, which was destroyed by the Soviet Army in July 1944. Above the roof of the museum, there is an observation tower available for tourists during the opening hours. The exhibition presents the local species of plants and animals shown through displays, but also through multimedia exhibits with the use of lighting and sound. Almost all living species in the region can be heard in audio recordings. Guides in foreign languages are available for an additional fee.

In almost every room of the museum, there are computers with information on the subject in different languages. However, the tour guides are also likely to repeat the same information for their listeners. All exhibits in the museum have been prepared professionally by scientists, with the general public in mind, and therefore are recommended for visitors of all ages.

At the turn of the 20th century during the Russian Partition of Poland a Palace Park (Polish: Park Pałacowy) was founded around the so-called Tsar's Palace in Białowieża. At the park, is a historic manor house from 1845 that has been refurbished. At present, it is the Centre for Nature Education.

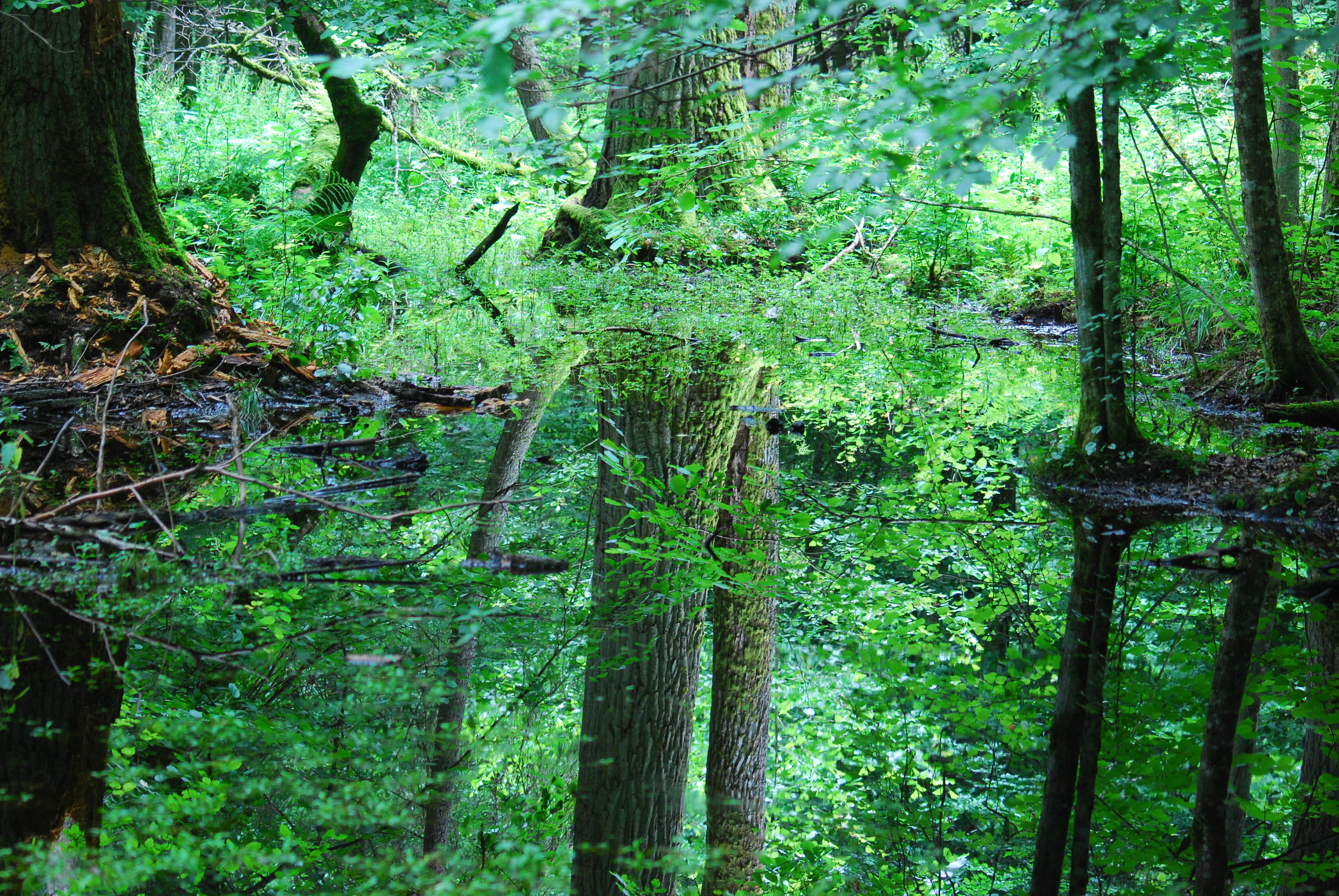
Swamped forest in Białowieża park

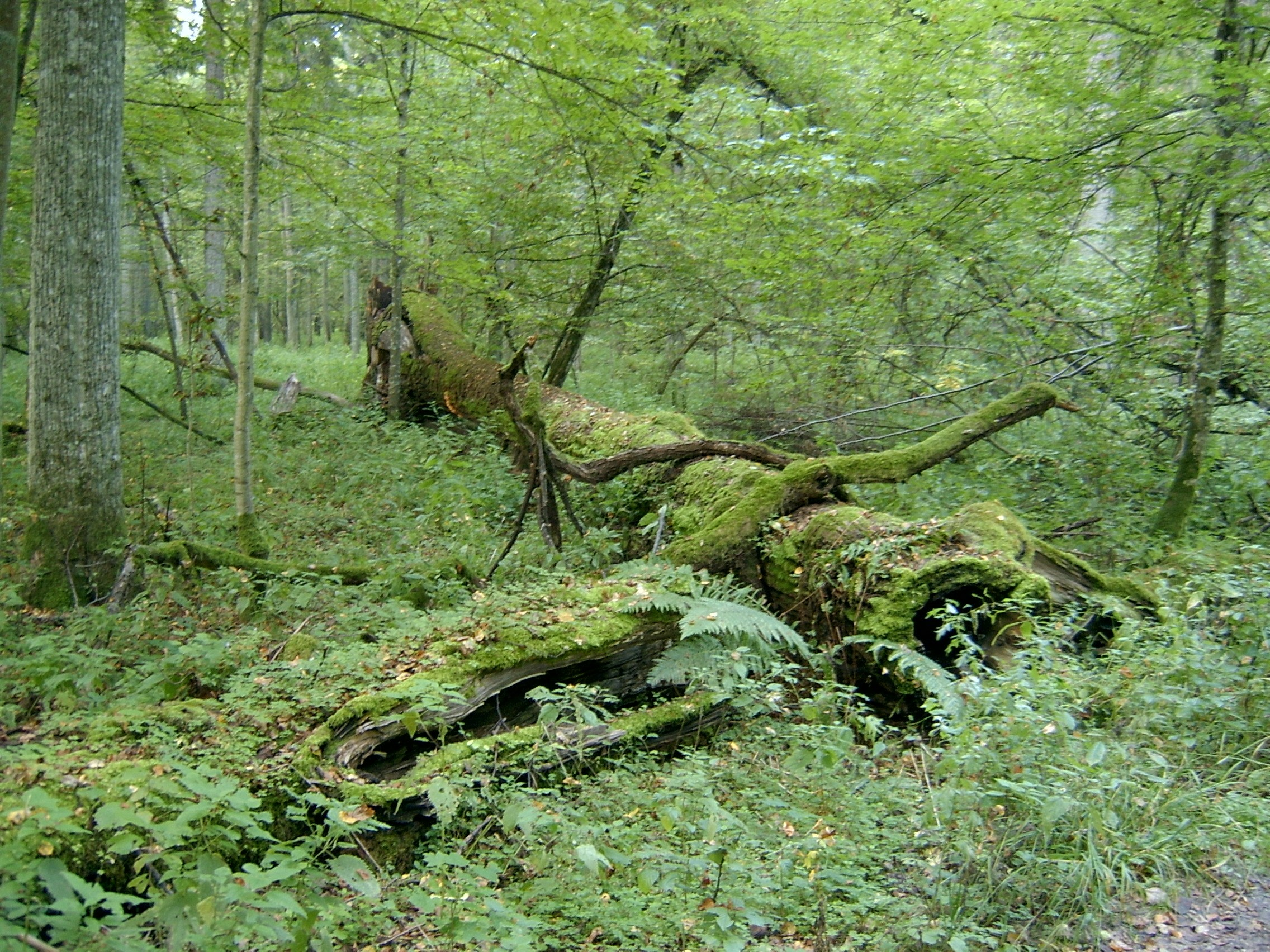
A fallen tree in Białowieża park

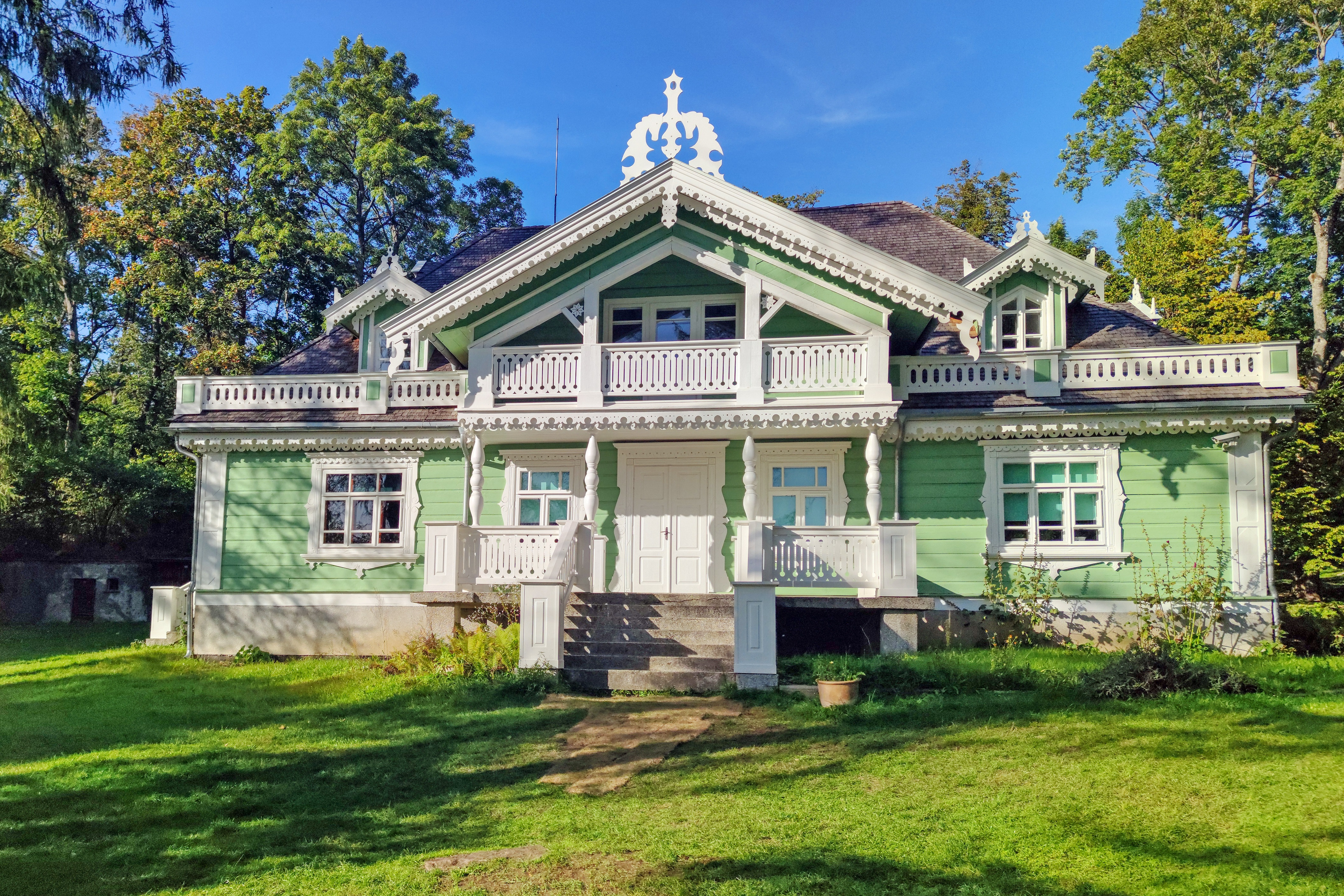
Center for Nature Education at the Białowieża National Park

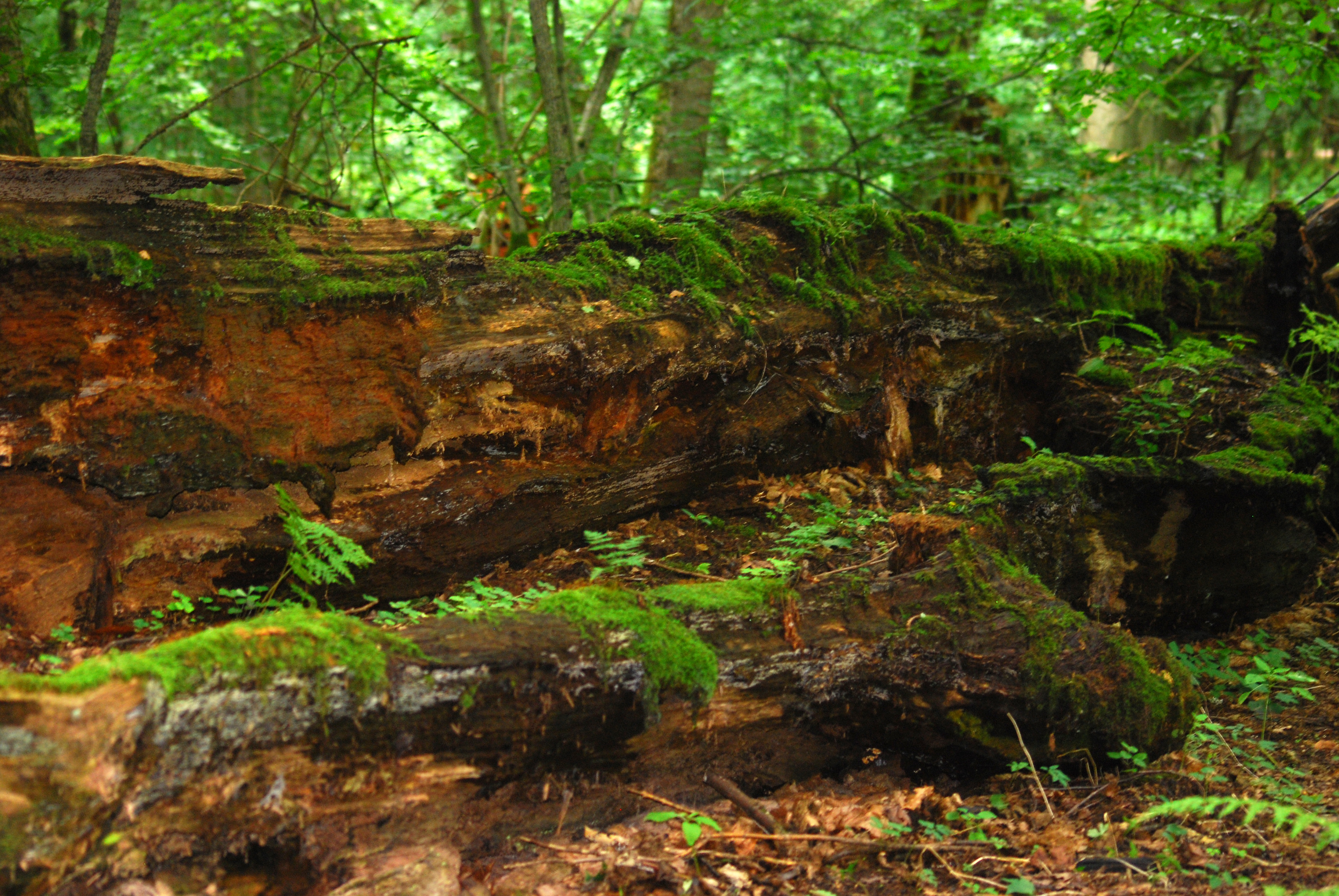
Rotting coarse woody debris in the bio-reserve

It is an endangered Important Bird Area of Poland.
