= Berta Vesmane =

Latvian politician (1878–1941)

Member of the Constitutional Assembly
- In office 1920–1922

Personal details
- Born: 10 October 1878 Riga, Russian Empire
- Died: 16 June 1941 (aged 62) Krustpils Station, Soviet Union

Berta Emīlija Vesmane (10 October 1878 – 16 June 1941) was a Latvian politician. In 1920 she was one of the six women elected to the Constitutional Assembly, Latvia's first female parliamentarians.

== Biography ==
Vesmane was born Berta Krisone in Riga in 1878. She completed courses in commerce in Saint Petersburg, and married Frīdrihs Vesmanis, who later became the first Speaker of the Saeima. She was a member of the revolutionary movement and was arrested several times. She also served as a trade union official in the Jelgava area.

In 1920 she was elected to the Constitutional Assembly as a representative of the Latvian Social Democratic Workers' Party, serving until 1922. She and Frīdrihs were arrested in 1941. She was seriously ill at the time and died on a train while at Krustpils Station.
