= Hajnówka Five =

Polish activists

The Hajnówka Five (Polish: Piątka z Hajnówki) refers to five Polish activists who in 2022 were criminally charged for providing humanitarian assistance to migrants who had crossed the border from Belarus into Poland. In 2025, the group were acquitted of all the charges against them.

== Background ==
On 22 March 2022, five activists – humanitarian and postman Mariusz Chyżyński, charity worker Joanna Agnieszka Humka, teacher Kamila Jagoda Mikołajek, ethnologist Ewa Moroz-Keczynska and Marco Winnicki – found a group of ten migrants hiding in the Białowieża National Park in eastern Poland, on the border with Belarus. The group, consisting of an Iraqi couple and their seven children and an Egyptian man, had spent several days in the forest. One activist provided the migrants with food, clothing and shelter, while the other four attempted to transport them to a border post in Białowieża in order for them to apply for international protection.

== Arrest, trial and acquittal ==
Four members of the Hajnówka Five were arrested while attempting to drive the migrants to Białowieża. The group were accused of providing "illegal assistance" to refugees and "making it easier for them to stay in the Republic of Poland [by] providing food and clothing to them while they were hiding in the woods". Prosecutors initially demanded that the activists be immediately imprisoned on charges of "aiding and abetting an illegal border crossing", which was denied by a court.

The prosecution later brought new charges against the Hajnówka Five of "enabling or facilitating someone's stay in Poland for financial or personal gain" under article 264a of Poland's penal code, accusing the group of being complicit with human trafficking and seeking year-long custodial sentences. These charges were taken to trial, which started on 28 January 2025 at the District Court of Bielsk Podlaski in Hajnówka before judge Adam Konrad Rodakowski. The media took an interest in the case, with the group's supporters demonstrating outside hearings and giving them the name the "Hajnówka Five"; the case subsequently transferred to a larger courthouse in Białystok to accommodate growing public interest. The group's defence argued that they had acted in a humanitarian by supporting assistance in the cold weather to the migrants, several of whom were in bad health, and to assist them in exercising their rights to claim asylum.

On 8 September 2025, the Hajnówka Five were acquitted of all charges, with Judge Rodakowski ruling that the prosecutors had failed to demonstrate how the defendants had gained any "personal benefit" for aiding the migrants; he also found there was no evidence to suggest there had been any contact between the activists and any people smugglers involved in getting the migrants to the border. Human Rights First praised the court for recognising that "solidarity is not a crime" and compared the trial to that of Ieva Raubiško in Latvia, who had been found guilty on similar charges. The Helsinki Foundation for Human Rights described the trial as "shameful" but praised the verdict as being a "major victory for justice".

Kamila M., one of the Hajnówka Five, was named the suspect in a separate investigation, in which she was accused of organising illegal crossings of the Polish border by helping arrange routes and transportation. The investigation remains ongoing as of October 2026.
