= Józef Broel-Plater =

Polish bobsledder (1890–1941)

Personal information
- Nationality: Polish
- Born: 15 November 1890 Kombuļi, Vitebsk Governorate, Russian Empire (present-day Latvia)
- Died: 30 June 1941 (aged 50) Dachau, Nazi Germany

Sport
- Sport: Bobsleigh

Józef Jan Andrzej Joachim Broel-Plater (15 November 1890 – 30 June 1941) was a Polish bobsledder. He competed in the four-man event at the 1928 Winter Olympics.

Plater volunteered for the French Army in October 1914, and fought in World War I. Afterwards he joined the Polish Army, and worked as a translator at its General Staff. In January 1940, he was arrested by Nazi German authorities and imprisoned in the Dachau concentration camp. He died there on 30 June 1941.
