= Aglona Municipality =

Former municipality of Latvia

Coordinates: 56°07′34″N 27°00′51″E

Aglona Municipality Aglonas novads
- Former municipality
- Flag Coat of arms

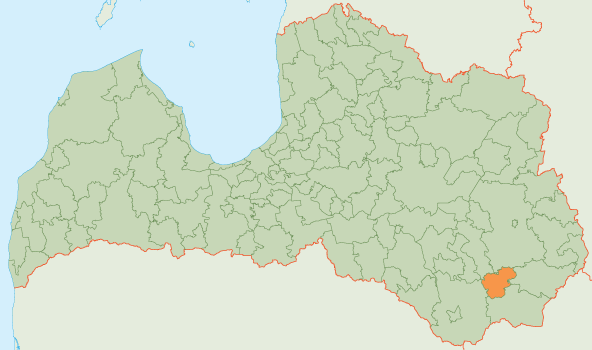
- Country: Latvia
- Formed: 2009
- Dissolved: 2021
- Centre: Aglona

Government
  - Council Chair (last): Juris Butēvics (Grāveri Parish List)

Area
  - Total: 392.54 km^{2} (151.56 sq mi)
  - Land: 357.74 km^{2} (138.12 sq mi)
  - Water: 34.8 km^{2} (13.4 sq mi)

Population (2021)
  - Total: 3,042
  - Density: 8.503/km^{2} (22.02/sq mi)
- Website: www.aglona.lv

Aglona Municipality (Latvian: Aglonas novads) was a municipality in Latgale, Latvia. The administrative centre was Aglona.

The municipality was formed in 2009 by merging Aglona Parish of the dissolved Preiļi district and Grāveri Parish, Kastuļina Parish and Šķeltova Parish of the former Krāslava district. The population in 2020 was 3,099.

On 1 July 2021, Aglona Municipality ceased to exist. Aglona Parish was merged into Preiļi Municipality, and Grāveri Parish, Kastuļina Parish and Šķeltova Parish were merged into Krāslava Municipality.

== See also ==
- Administrative divisions of Latvia (2009)
