= Benson T. Chertok =

American nuclear physicist (1935–1981)

- Born: May 15, 1935; Laconia, New Hampshire, United States
- Died: September 24, 1981 (aged 46); Washington, D.C., United States
- Education: Massachusetts Institute of Technology (SB, 1957) (SM, 1960); Boston University (PhD, 1964)
- Scientific career
- Workplaces: The American University

Benson T. Chertok was professor of physics at The American University in Washington, D.C., a researcher in the field of high energy nuclear physics, and an advocate for arms control.

== Personal ==
Benson T. Chertok was born the last of four children to Max and Rose Chertok, both Russian emigrants. He was born in Laconia, New Hampshire, on May 15, 1935, and died at the age of 46 in Washington, D. C., on September 24, 1981, of cancer.

== Education ==
Chertok attended public schools in Laconia, followed by prep school at Tilton, N. H., where he graduated as valedictorian in 1953. He enrolled at Massachusetts Institute of Technology and received a S. B. in chemical engineering in 1957 and a S. M. in nuclear engineering in 1960. While at MIT, Chertok traveled to Ghana with Operation Crossroads Africa and built schoolhouses. On his return, he completed a Ph.D. in nuclear physics at Boston University in 1964 as the first doctoral student of Edward Booth.

== Academics and research ==
After 18 months in the Army, Chertok in 1966 joined the faculty at The American University, in Washington, D.C. From 1964 to 1970, he was a guest worker at the Center for Radiation Research at the National Bureau of Standards and performed electron scattering experiments in the 100 MeV region with a grant from the Atomic Energy Commission.

In 1970, Chertok went to the Stanford Linear Accelerator Center (SLAC) on sabbatical leave and there conceived the idea for a high energy electron scattering experiment on deuterium. His proposal, approved by a SLAC Scientific Review Board totally focused on elementary particles, led to the first of three experiments at SLAC that he performed between 1974 and 1980. He assembled a team of physicists starting with Ray Arnold (2000 Bonner prize recipient), and followed by Steve Rock, Zen Szalata and Peter Bosted. Other collaborators included Fred Martin and Bernhard Mecking. Under Chertok's leadership, the team received continuous funding from the NSF starting in 1972 and continuing after his death in 1981.

The first to use high energy electron beams to study nuclear structure, the SLAC experiments led by Chertok successfully furthered the understanding of the nuclear form factors in the region of momentum transfers where the traditional picture of nuclei made of nucleons begins to merge with the picture of nucleons made of quarks. These investigations began the study the interface between nuclear and high energy particle physics.

In 1976, Chertok, together with Stanley Brodsky of SLAC (2007 J. J. Sakurai Prize Winner), developed the theory for high momentum nuclear processes and interpreted the results of the SLAC experiments in terms of quantum chromodynamics, the fundamental theory underlying hadron and nuclear interactions. Their papers began the field of "nuclear chromodynamics" and introduced the concept of "reduced nuclear amplitudes" where quark degrees of freedom in the nucleus become manifest.

Throughout his career, Chertok was an active voice for arms control. At the American University, Chertok developed a course, "Arms Control, Politics, and Science," which became one of the most popular courses offered by the physics department. He interviewed policy makers and activists on the university radio station, WAMU. Additionally, Chertok was a proponent of peaceful uses of nuclear energy and participated in the international effort to free Soviet physicist refuseniks.

In 1980, Chertok and his family moved to Geneva, Switzerland, where he spent a sabbatical year working on the UA1 experiment at CERN.

== Experiments at SLAC ==
- E-101: Measurement of e-D Elastic Scattering in the Range 1 < Q2 < 6-GeV2

Proposed: 23 April 1973, Approved: 26 May 1973, Began: 31 Jan. 1974, Completed: 1974

- E-121: Measurement of the Elastic Form-Factors of HE-3 and HE-4 in the Range of 0.8 <= Q2< 4 GEV2

Proposed: May 1975, Approved: 29 Jan. 1977, Began: Feb. 1977, Completed: 22 May 1977

- E-133: Measurement of the Elastic Electron-Neutron Cross Section at High Q2

Proposed: 10 Jan. 1978, Approved: 22 March 1978, Began: Feb. 1979, Completed: April 1979

== Most cited peer-reviewed papers ==
- Brodsky SJ, Chertok BT. Asymptotic form factors of hadrons and nuclei and the continuity of particle and nuclear dynamics. Physical Review D. 1976 Dec 1;14(11):3003. According to Google Scholar, cited 355 times
- Arnold RG, Chertok BT, Dally, EB, Grigorian A, Jordan CL, et al. Measurement of the electron-Deuteron Elastic Scattering Cross-Section in the Range 0.8-GeV**2 <= q**2<= 6-GeV**2. Physical Review Letters. 1975 Sep 22;35:776. According to Inspirehep.net, cited 351 times.
- Brodsky SJ, Chertok BT. Deuteron form factor and the short-distance behavior of the nuclear force. Physical Review Letters. 1976 Aug 2;37(5):269. According to Google Scholar, cited 180 times

== Academic memorials ==
- The Benson T. Chertok Memorial Fund Award for Academic Excellence and Undergraduate Research at The American University, started in 1981.
- The Dr. Benson T. Chertok Lectureship Fund at Boston University (annual Physics Department colloquium), started in 1984.
