= Piedruja Parish =

Parish of Latvia

- parish of Latvia
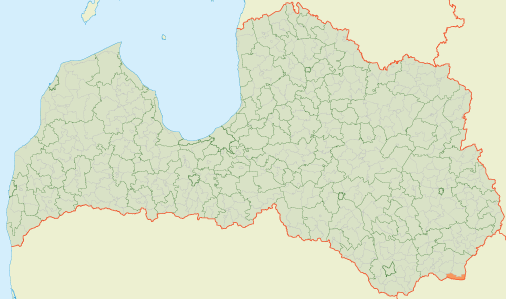
- 55°48′37″N 27°29′38″E

- Location within Latvia
- Country: Latvia

Area
  - Total: 64.80 km^{2} (25.02 sq mi)
  - Land: 61.62 km^{2} (23.79 sq mi)
  - Water: 3.18 km^{2} (1.23 sq mi)

Population (1 January 2026)
  - Total: 333
  - Density: 5.40/km^{2} (14.0/sq mi)

Piedruja Parish (Latvian: Piedrujas pagasts) is an administrative unit of Krāslava Municipality in the Latgale region of Latvia, named for the town Piedruja.

The parish is located in the municipality's southeast, on the right bank of the Daugava River near the Belarus-Latvia border.
