= Frīdrihs Vesmanis =

Latvian lawyer and politician (1875–1941)

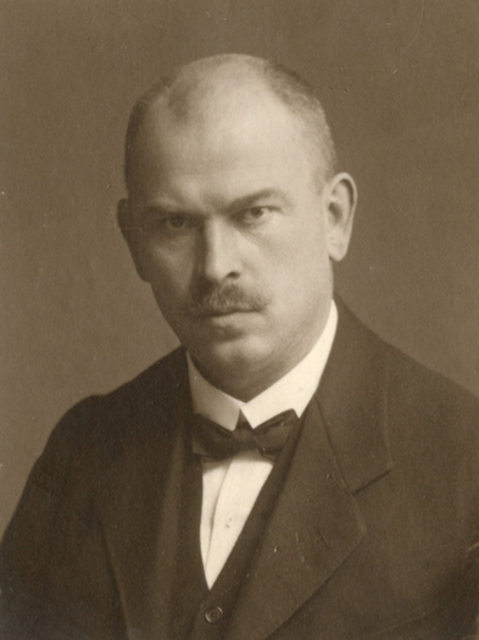

Member of the People's Council of Latvia
- In office July 1919 – August 1919

Mayor of Jelgava
- In office February 1920 – May 1920

Speaker of the Saeima
- In office 7 November 1922 – 17 March 1925
- President: Jānis Čakste
- Prime Minister: Zigfrīds Anna Meierovics; Jānis Pauļuks; Voldemārs Zāmuēls; Hugo Celmiņš
- Preceded by: Position established
- Succeeded by: Pauls Kalniņš

Latvian Ambassador to the United Kingdom
- In office February 1925 – March 1932
- Preceded by: Position established
- Succeeded by: Kārlis Reinholds Zariņš

Member of the Senate of the Supreme Court of Latvia
- In office March 1932 – 1934

Personal details
- Born: 15 April 1875 Rundāle Parish, Kurzeme, Russian Empire (now Latvia)
- Died: 7 December 1941 (aged 66) Usollag, Russian SFSR, Soviet Union
- Party: LSDSP
- Education: University of Tartu; Saint Petersburg State University
- Profession: Lawyer
- Awards: Order of the Three Stars, 2nd Class (1926)

Frīdrihs Vesmanis (April 15, 1875 – December 7, 1941) was a Latvian lawyer and politician for the LSDWP and the first Speaker of the Saeima.

== Early life ==
Vesmanis was born on April 15, 1875, in Rundāle Parish to Kārļa Vesmaņa and Elizabetes Vesmanes (née Straumanes). After graduating from Jelgava Gymnasium, Vesmanis studied at the University of Tartu. He was arrested in 1897, and after his arrest, emigrated to England in 1899, where he published in the newspapers Sociāldemokrāts and Latviešu Strādnieks. In 1903, however, he was illegally returned to Latvia, but was promptly arrested and deported to a camp in Šiauliai. In 1909, he graduated from St. Petersburg University. Until 1918, Vesmanis has been a lawyer in Jelgava and St. Petersburg, as well as working in journalism. In April 1918, he returned to Latvia. He married Berta Krisone.

== Political career ==
In 1919, from July to August, Vesmanis was a member of the People's Council of Latvia. In 1920, from February to May, he was the mayor of Jelgava, but later worked in the Constitutional Assembly of Latvia. In 1922, after founding the Central Election Commission, Vesmanis was one of the eight original members. He was elected to the 1st Saeima from the LSDWP and was the first Speaker of the Saeima. From February 1925 to March 1932, Vesmanis was the ambassador of Latvia in the United Kingdom. In 1927, after the death of Jānis Čakste, he was one of the candidates for the position of President. He retired in 1937.

He received the Order of the Three Stars 2nd Class in 1926.

== Deportation and death ==
On June 14, 1941, Vesmanis and his wife were arrested for being a "Socialist leader in [the] extreme right direction." Berta died two days later while on a train at Krustpils Station, while Vesmanis was sent to the Solikamsk Penitentiary, and died on December 7 at Umolya Penitentiary in Surmog.
