= Chartok =

Village in Grodno Region, Belarus

Chartok Чарток (Belarusian)
- Village
- Location within Belarus
- Coordinates: 53°52′N 23°39′E
- Country: Belarus
- Region: Grodno Region
- District: Grodno District
- Time zone: UTC+3 (MSK)

Chartok or Chertok (Belarusian: Чарток, romanized: Čartok; Russian: Черток; Polish: Czortek) is a village in Grodno District, Grodno Region, in western Belarus. It is part of Sapotskin selsoviet; previously it was part of Sapotskin possoviet.

It is situated by the Augustów Canal. A sluice which used to be by the village was destroyed during World War II. It was reconstructed in 2000s.

The village used to be within the border zone of restricted travel with Poland. In the 2000s, this restriction was lifted to enhance the development of tourism in the area.

== History ==
In the interwar period, Czortek, as it was known in Polish, was administratively located in the Augustów County in the Białystok Voivodeship of Poland. According to the 1921 census, the village had a population of 64, entirely Polish by nationality and Catholic by confession.

Following the invasion of Poland in September 1939, the village was first occupied by the Soviet Union until 1941, then by Nazi Germany until 1944, and then re-occupied by the Soviet Union, which eventually annexed it from Poland in 1945.
