= Dagda, Latvia =

Town in Krāslava Municipality, Latvia

Dagda
- Town
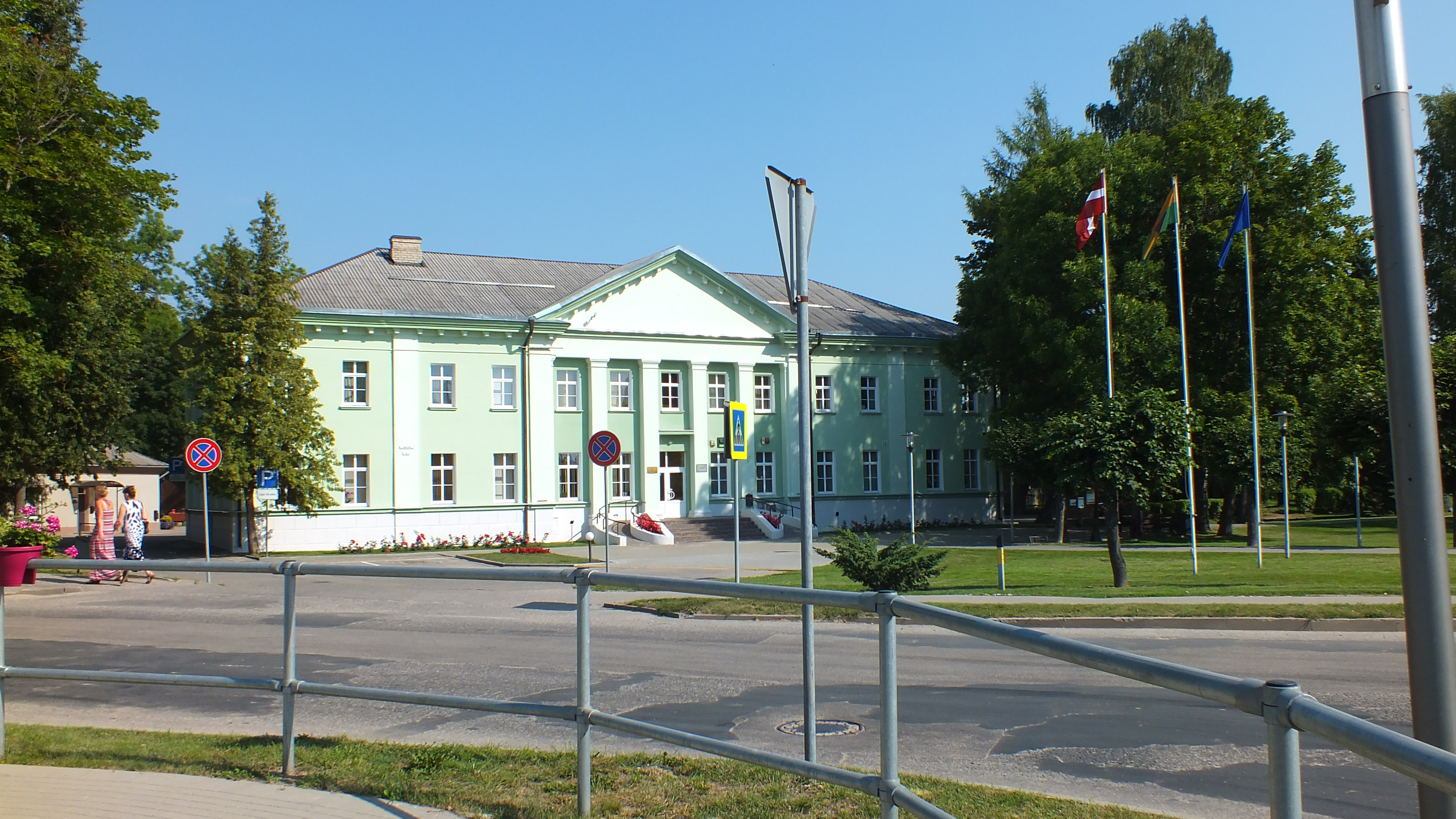
- Town hall in Dagda

- Flag Coat of arms

- Location in Latvia
- Coordinates: 56°5′N 27°32′E
- Country: Latvia
- Municipality: Krāslava Municipality
- Town rights: 1992

Government
  - Mayor: Viktors Stikuts
  - City council: 9 members

Area
  - Total: 2.92 km^{2} (1.13 sq mi)
  - Land: 2.85 km^{2} (1.10 sq mi)
  - Water: 0.07 km^{2} (0.027 sq mi)

Population (2026)
  - Total: 1,756
  - Density: 616/km^{2} (1,600/sq mi)
- Time zone: UTC+2 (EET)
  - Summer (DST): UTC+3 (EEST)
- Postal code: LV-5674
- Calling code: +371 656
- Climate: Dfb
- Website: www.dagda.lv

Dagda is a town in Krāslava Municipality in the Latgale region of Latvia. The town is near Latvia's border with Belarus.

== Climate ==
Dagda has a humid continental climate (Köppen Dfb). In March 1972, the deepest ground frost in Latvia was registered in Dagda - 150 cm (59 in).

Climate data for Dagda, Latvia (1991-2020 normals, extremes 1956-present)
Month	Jan	Feb	Mar	Apr	May	Jun	Jul	Aug	Sep	Oct	Nov	Dec	Year
Record high °C (°F)	10.3 (50.5)	11.4 (52.5)	17.8 (64.0)	26.6 (79.9)	29.7 (85.5)	31.3 (88.3)	34.0 (93.2)	34.7 (94.5)	29.4 (84.9)	23.0 (73.4)	15.0 (59.0)	10.0 (50.0)	34.7 (94.5)
Mean daily maximum °C (°F)	−2.3 (27.9)	−1.6 (29.1)	3.4 (38.1)	11.6 (52.9)	17.7 (63.9)	21.0 (69.8)	23.3 (73.9)	22.1 (71.8)	16.5 (61.7)	9.5 (49.1)	3.0 (37.4)	−0.8 (30.6)	10.3 (50.5)
Daily mean °C (°F)	−4.8 (23.4)	−4.7 (23.5)	−0.5 (31.1)	6.4 (43.5)	12.0 (53.6)	15.5 (59.9)	17.8 (64.0)	16.6 (61.9)	11.7 (53.1)	5.9 (42.6)	0.7 (33.3)	−2.9 (26.8)	6.1 (43.1)
Mean daily minimum °C (°F)	−7.5 (18.5)	−8.1 (17.4)	−4.5 (23.9)	1.3 (34.3)	6.3 (43.3)	10.1 (50.2)	12.7 (54.9)	11.5 (52.7)	7.2 (45.0)	2.6 (36.7)	−1.7 (28.9)	−5.3 (22.5)	2.0 (35.6)
Record low °C (°F)	−36.1 (−33.0)	−37.6 (−35.7)	−32.0 (−25.6)	−16.2 (2.8)	−3.2 (26.2)	0.0 (32.0)	4.3 (39.7)	1.0 (33.8)	−3.8 (25.2)	−11.0 (12.2)	−23.3 (−9.9)	−35.8 (−32.4)	−37.6 (−35.7)
Average precipitation mm (inches)	48.5 (1.91)	42.7 (1.68)	37.9 (1.49)	37.1 (1.46)	61.0 (2.40)	78.3 (3.08)	73.2 (2.88)	70.7 (2.78)	55.8 (2.20)	62.9 (2.48)	54.9 (2.16)	47.6 (1.87)	670.6 (26.39)
Average precipitation days (≥ 1 mm)	12	10	9	8	9	11	11	10	9	12	11	12	124
Source 1: LVĢMC
Source 2: NOAA (precipitation days 1991-2020)

== History ==
Dagda as an ancestral estate was founded in the 17th century by Johann Franz von Gilsen, Chancellor of the Duchy of Courland and Semigallia. He established the first Catholic community here and built a wooden church. This marked the beginning of the written history of the settlement.

The last local representative of the Gilsen family, Jerzy, died in 1788. His widow sold the estate to the Bujnicki family. The most notable of them, writer and publicist Kazimierz Bujnicki, made a significant contribution to the region's culture and was one of the initiators of the abolition of serfdom in Latgale.

In the early 19th century, the Dagda estate became home to a unique library, an archive, and a collection of artworks and archaeological finds accumulated by the Gilsen and Bujnicki families. All of this was destroyed during the Polish January Uprising of 1863–1864 when the estate was burned down. Only the park with its dug canals survived.

According to the 1897 census, the town of Dagda had a population of 1,516 people, including 1,026 of Jewish faith and 377 Roman Catholics.

== See also ==
- List of cities and towns in Latvia
- Dagda Parish, located next to the city limits
