= Ezernieki Parish =

Parish of Latvia

- parish of Latvia
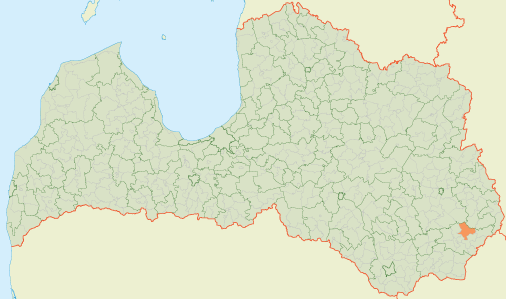
- Coordinates: 56°10′51″N 27°40′33″E
- Country: Latvia

Population (1 January 2026)
  - Total: 507
- Time zone: Eastern European Time

Ezernieki Parish (Latvian: Ezernieku pagasts) is an administrative territorial entity of Krāslava Municipality in the Latgale region of Latvia. It is located in the municipality's north, on the shores of Lake Eša.

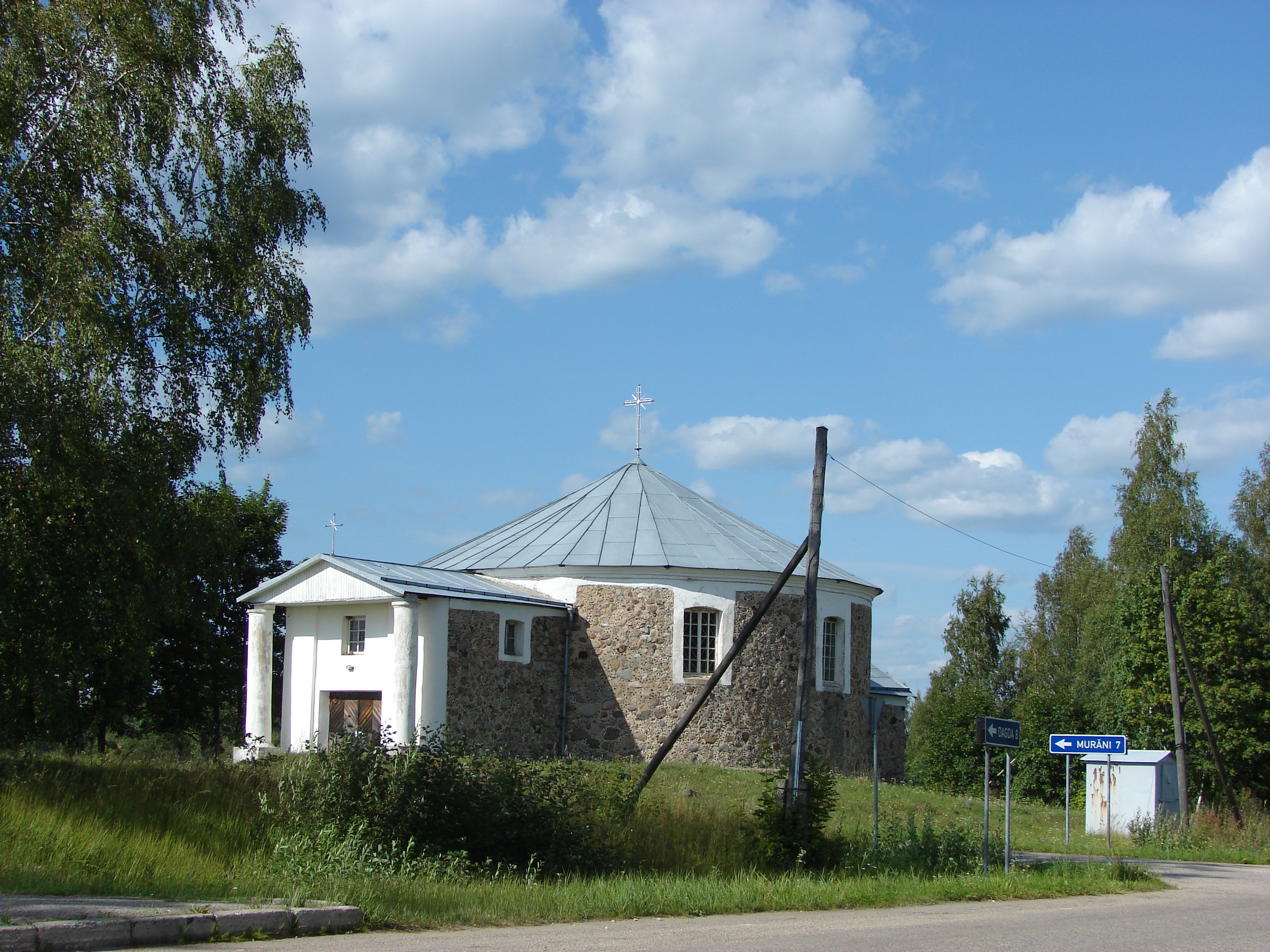
Roman Catholic chapel in Ezernieki parish
