= Kaplava Parish =

Parish of Latvia

- parish of Latvia
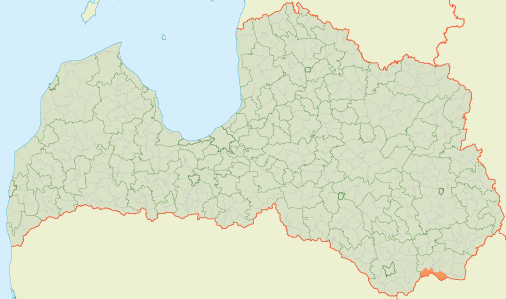
- 55°50′34″N 27°10′10″E
- Country: Latvia

Area
  - Total: 125.32 km^{2} (48.39 sq mi)
  - Land: 119.48 km^{2} (46.13 sq mi)
  - Water: 5.84 km^{2} (2.25 sq mi)

Population (1 January 2026)
  - Total: 395
  - Density: 3.31/km^{2} (8.56/sq mi)

Kaplava Parish (Latvian: Kaplavas pagasts, Latgalian: Kaplovys pogosts) is an administrative unit of Krāslava Municipality, in the Selonia region of Latvia. The parish is located on the left bank of the Daugava River, on the Belarus-Latvia border.
