= Kastuļina Parish =

Parish of Latvia

- parish of Latvia
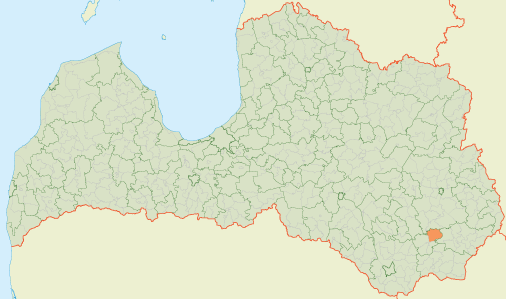
- 56°09′35″N 27°12′31″E
- Country: Latvia

Area
  - Total: 119.96 km^{2} (46.32 sq mi)
  - Land: 107.79 km^{2} (41.62 sq mi)
  - Water: 12.17 km^{2} (4.70 sq mi)

Population (1 January 2024)
  - Total: 566
  - Density: 4.7/km^{2} (12/sq mi)

Kastuļina Parish (Latvian: Kastuļinas pagasts) is an administrative unit of Krāslava Municipality. From 2009 until 2021, it was part of the former Aglona Municipality. The parish center is in Priežmale, in the central part of the parish, on the eastern shore of Lake Geraņimova Ilza.
