= Šķaune Parish =

Parish of Latvia

- parish of Latvia
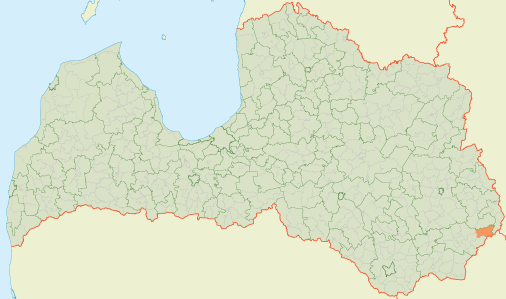
- 56°09′46″N 27°56′59″E
- Country: Latvia

Area
  - Total: 120.98 km^{2} (46.71 sq mi)
  - Land: 120.98 km^{2} (46.71 sq mi)
  - Water: 2.35 km^{2} (0.91 sq mi)

Population (1 January 2024)
  - Total: 386
  - Density: 3.2/km^{2} (8.3/sq mi)

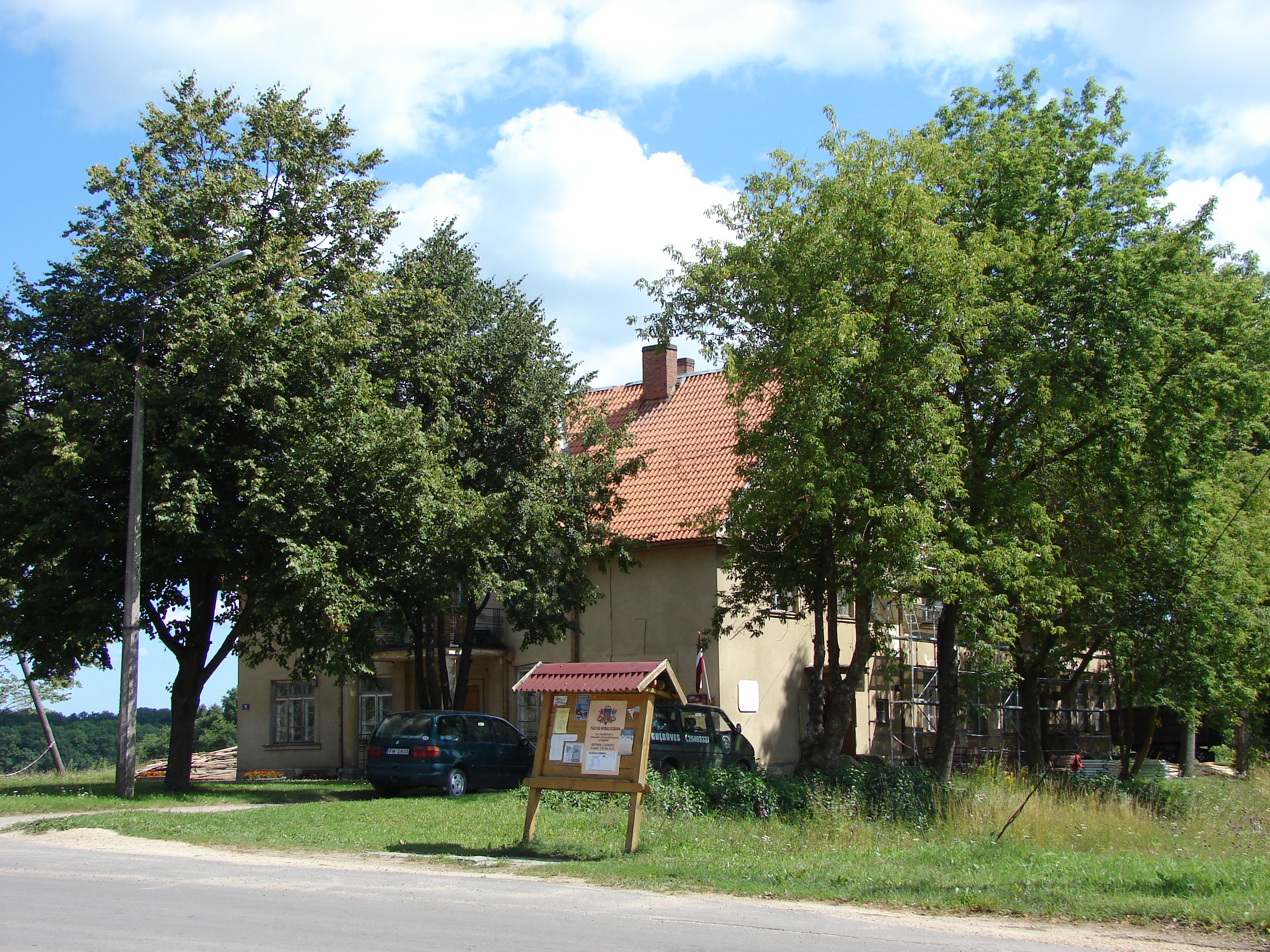
Šķaune Parish Administration Building (2008)

Šķaune Parish (Latvian: Šķaunes pagasts) is an administrative unit of Krāslava Municipality in the Latgale region of Latvia.
