= Šķeltova Parish =

Parish of Latvia

- parish of Latvia
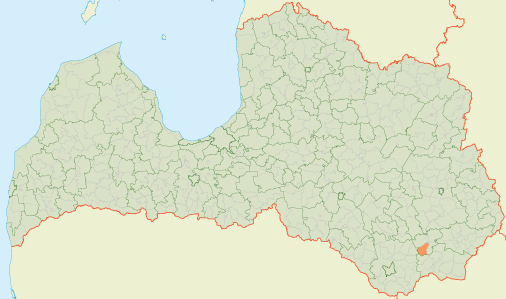
- 56°02′37″N 27°02′23″E
- Country: Latvia

Area
  - Total: 75.23 km^{2} (29.05 sq mi)
  - Land: 72.15 km^{2} (27.86 sq mi)
  - Water: 3.08 km^{2} (1.19 sq mi)

Population (1 January 2024)
  - Total: 437
  - Density: 5.8/km^{2} (15/sq mi)

Šķeltova Parish (Latvian: Šķeltovas pagasts) is an administrative unit of Krāslava Municipality, Latvia. From 2009 until 2021, it was part of the former Aglona Municipality. The parish center is in Šķeltova in the southwestern part of the parish, near Lake Šķeltova.
