= Belarus–Latvia border =

International border

Characteristics
- Entities: Belarus Latvia
- Length: 172.912 kilometres (107.443 mi)

Belarusian and Latvian boundary markers

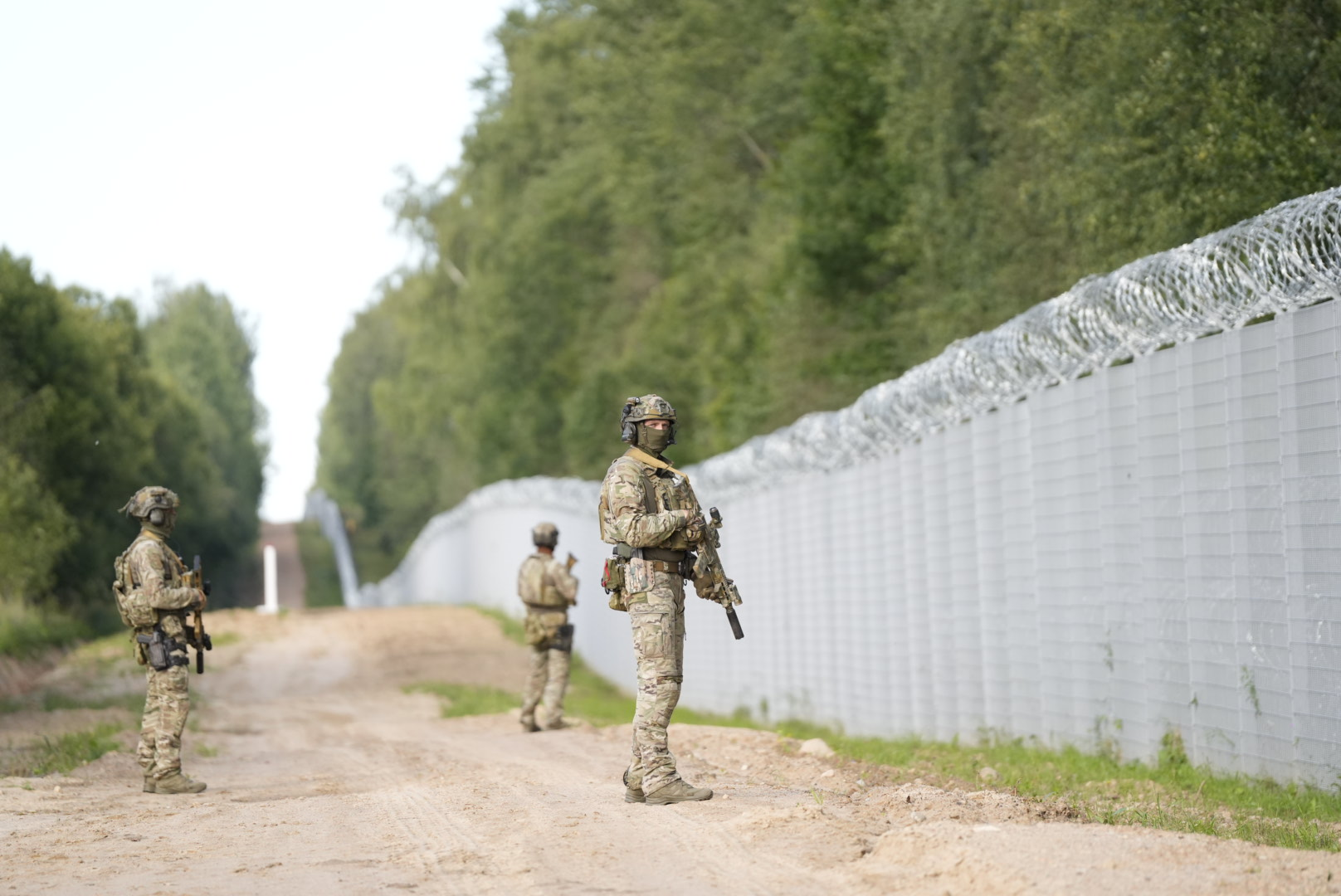
Belarus–Latvia border in Krāslava Municipality, 2023

The Belarus–Latvia border is of 172.912 km (107.443 mi) length. It spans from the tripoint with Lithuania to the tripoint with Russia. It is an external border of the European Union.

The current border between the republics of Belarus (CIS member) and Latvia (EU member) was established after the dissolution of the Soviet Union and confirmed by an agreement of 21 February 1994 about the establishment of the border, finalized on April 10, 2013, in the agreement about the functioning of the border.

For about 16.6 km (10.3 mi), the border runs along the Daugava River. It also crosses the Lake Rychy and an island in the lake. The border starts from the triple junction of the borders with Lithuania ( 55°40′50.17″N 26°37′49.79″E ) and continues to the east to the triple junction of the borders with Russia ( 56°10′12″N 28°09′04″E )

Concerns have been raised at the treatment of refugees at the border. Ieva Raubiško, a Latvian human rights activist, was found guilty of supporting the intentional crossing of refugees from Belarus to Latvia; she had submitted an urgent review to the European Court of Human Rights about the treatment of refugees.

== Border crossings ==
The May 10, 2006 decree of the President of Belarus no. 313 established the following border crossings.

| # | Name (Belarus — Latvia) | Crossing type |
|---|---|---|
| 1 | Minsk, Belarus — Daugavpils, Latvia | railroad |
| 2 | Hryharowshchyna (Грыгароўшчына) — Paternieki | highway |
| 3 | Urbany (Урбаны) — Silene | highway |
| 4 | Hawrylina (Гаўрыліна) — Meikšāni | simplified crossing |
| 5 | Druya (Друя) — Piedruja | simplified crossing |
| 6 | Lipawka (Ліпаўка) — Vorzova | simplified crossing |
| 7 | Plyusy (Плюсы) — Kaplava | simplified crossing |

== See also ==
- Baltic Defence Line
