= Kalnieši Parish =

Parish of Latvia

- parish of Latvia
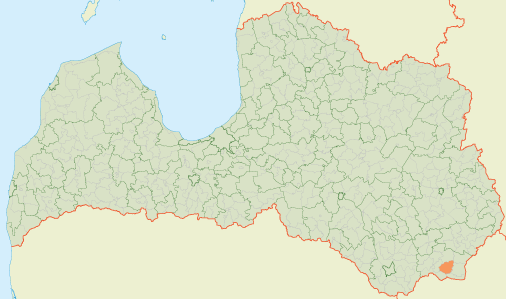
- 55°53′24″N 27°22′18″E
- Country: Latvia

Area
  - Total: 112.25 km^{2} (43.34 sq mi)
  - Land: 107.57 km^{2} (41.53 sq mi)
  - Water: 4.68 km^{2} (1.81 sq mi)

Population (1 January 2024)
  - Total: 489
  - Density: 4.4/km^{2} (11/sq mi)

Kalnieši Parish (Latvian: Kalniešu pagasts) is an administrative unit of Krāslava Municipality, Latvia.

It is located in the municipality's center, on the right bank of the Daugava River.

== Towns, villages and settlements of Kalnieši Parish ==
- Kalnieši
- Andžāni
