= Ūdrīši Parish =

Parish of Latvia

- parish of Latvia
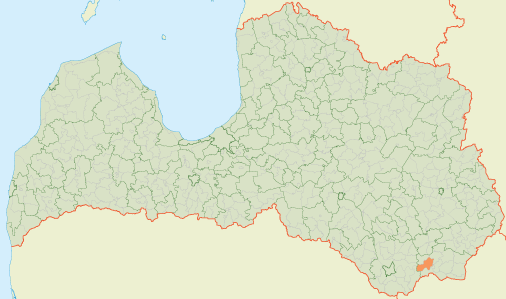
- 55°55′05″N 27°03′53″E
- Country: Latvia

Area
  - Total: 107.84 km^{2} (41.64 sq mi)
  - Land: 105.01 km^{2} (40.54 sq mi)
  - Water: 2.83 km^{2} (1.09 sq mi)

Population (1 January 2025)
  - Total: 971
  - Density: 9.25/km^{2} (23.9/sq mi)

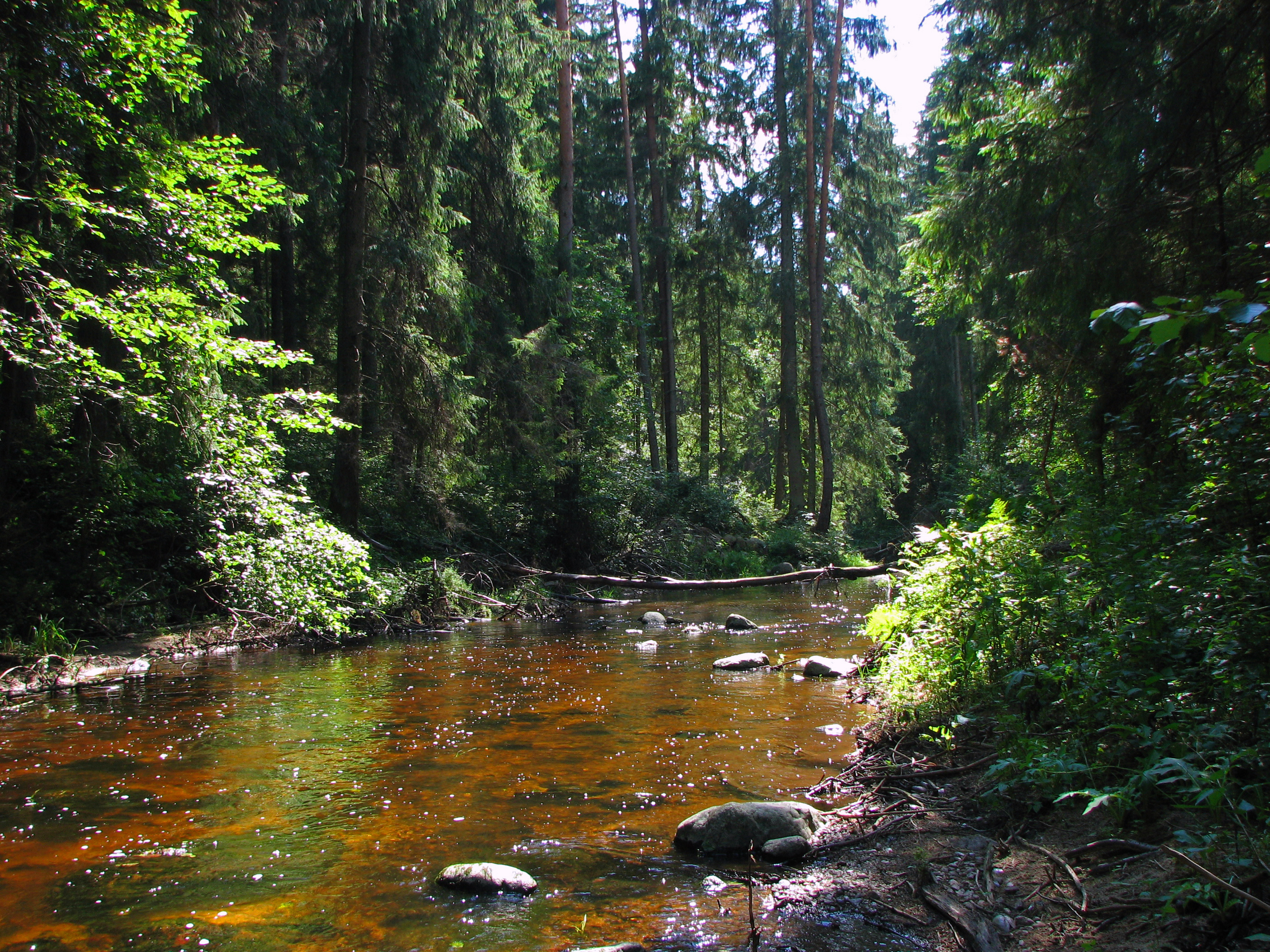
The Rudņa River in Daugavas loki Nature Park

Ūdrīši Parish (Latvian: Ūdrīšu pagasts, Latgalian: Iudreišu pogosts) is an administrative unit of Krāslava Municipality in the Latgale region of Latvia. It is located in the western part of the municipality and on the right bank of the Daugava River.

== Villages and settlements of Ūdrīši parish ==
- Augstkalne (parish centre)
