= Andrupene Parish =

Parish of Latvia

- parish of Latvia
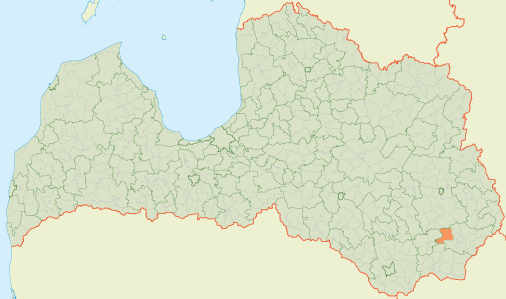
- 56°08′52″N 27°22′11″E
- Country: Latvia

Area
  - Total: 136.19 km^{2} (52.58 sq mi)
  - Land: 129.46 km^{2} (49.98 sq mi)
  - Water: 6.73 km^{2} (2.60 sq mi)

Population (1 January 2024)
  - Total: 833
  - Density: 6.1/km^{2} (16/sq mi)

Andrupene Parish (Latvian: Andrupenes pagasts) is an administrative unit of Krāslava Municipality in the Latgale region of Latvia. The parish center is located in Andrupene.
