= Auleja Parish =

Parish in Krāslava Municipality, Latvia

- parish of Latvia
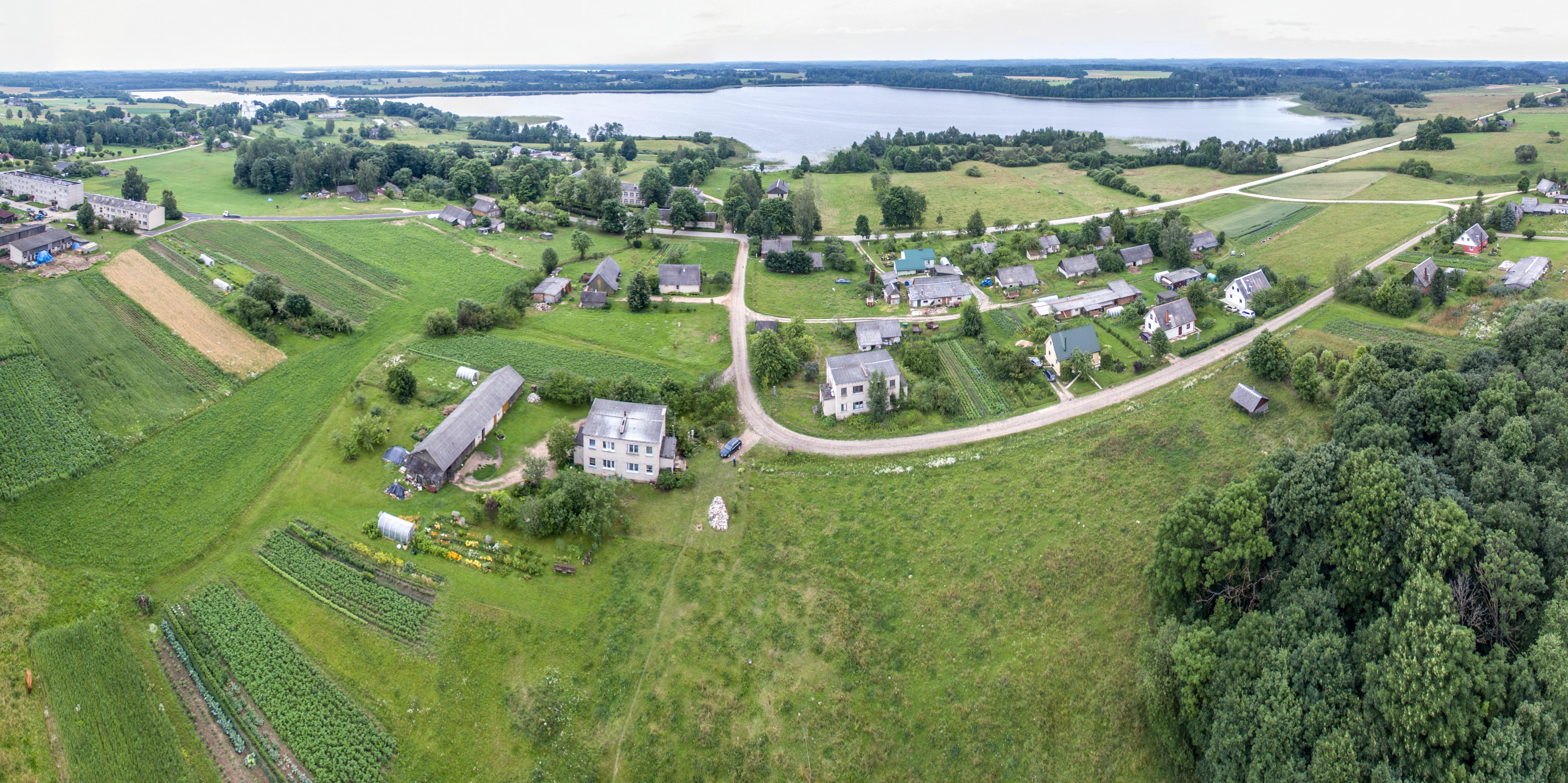

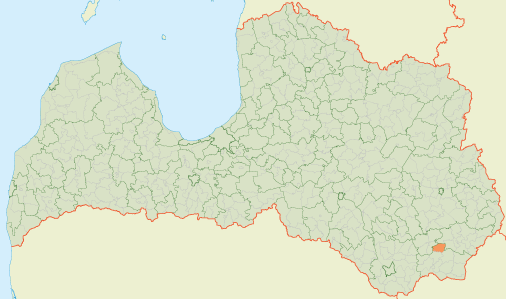
- 56°03′04″N 27°16′23″E
- Country: Latvia

Area
  - Total: 58.11 km^{2} (22.44 sq mi)
  - Land: 58.11 km^{2} (22.44 sq mi)
  - Water: 16.41 km^{2} (6.34 sq mi)

Population (1 January 2024)
  - Total: 408
  - Density: 7.0/km^{2} (18/sq mi)

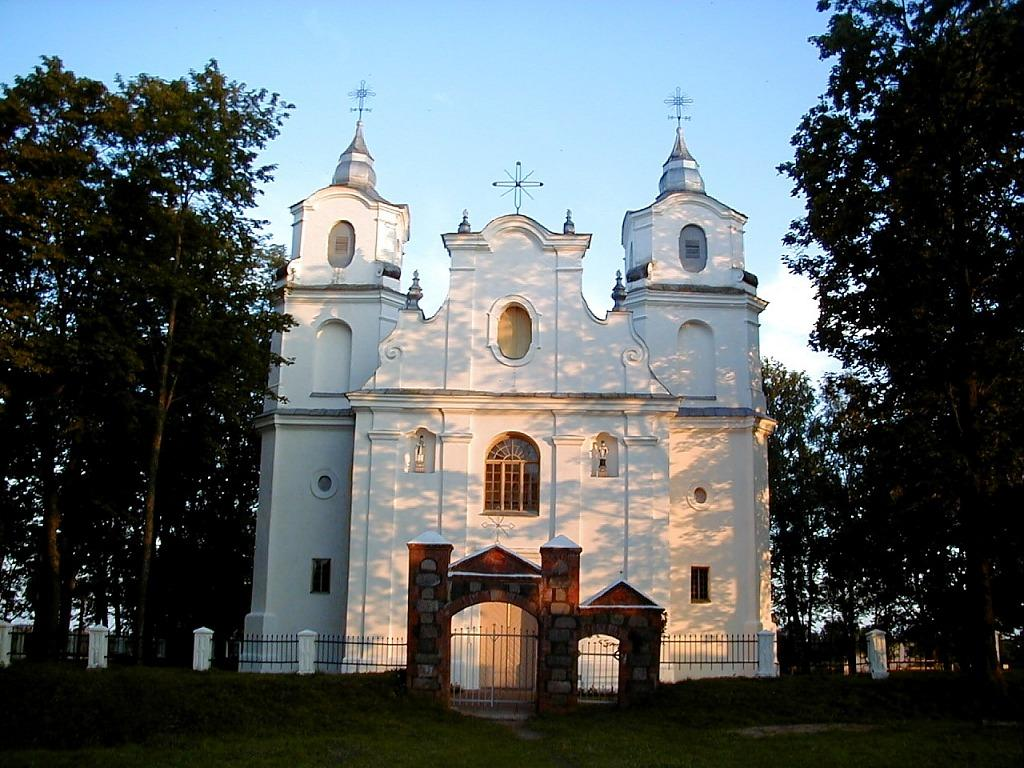
Auleja Mary Magdalene Roman Catholic Church, erected in 1709

Auleja Parish (Latvian: Aulejas pagasts, Latgalian: Aulejis pogosts) is an administrative unit of Krāslava Municipality, Latvia. The administrative center is the village of Auleja.

== Villages and settlements of Auleja parish ==
- Auleja (parish centre)
