= Dagda Parish =

Parish in Krāslava Municipality, Latvia

- parish of Latvia
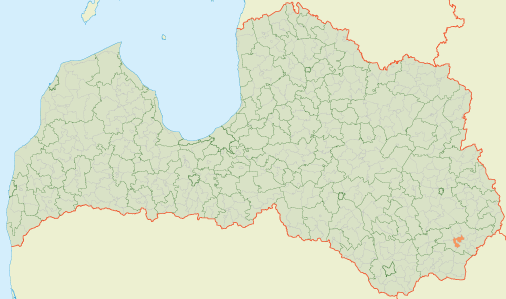
- Coordinates: 56°05′57″N 27°33′05″E
- Country: Latvia

Population (1 January 2026)
  - Total: 496

Dagda Parish (Latvian: Dagdas pagasts) is an administrative unit of Krāslava Municipality in the Latgale region of Latvia. The village of Ozoliņi is the administrative center of the parish, although the name of the parish comes from the nearby town of Dagda.

== Villages and settlements of Dagda Parish ==
- Ozoliņi (parish center)
- Alženova
- Bojāri
- Dagdas muiža ('Dagda Manor')
- Jubeļi
- Midiši
- Neikuri
- Plotki
- Purpļi
- Rabši
- Rumpīši
- Sloboda
- Ustje
- Vecdome
- Zeļļi
