= Robežnieki Parish =

Parish of Latvia

- parish of Latvia
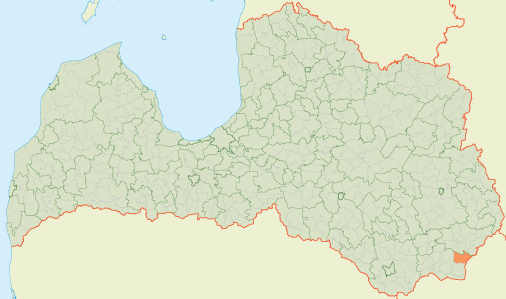
- 55°57′46″N 27°35′09″E

- Location within Latvia
- Country: Latvia

Area
  - Total: 127.28 km^{2} (49.14 sq mi)
  - Land: 120.57 km^{2} (46.55 sq mi)
  - Water: 6.71 km^{2} (2.59 sq mi)

Population (1 January 2026)
  - Total: 608
  - Density: 5.04/km^{2} (13.1/sq mi)

Robežnieki Parish (Latvian: Robežnieku pagasts, Latgalian: Pūstinis pogosts) is an administrative unit of Krāslava Municipality, Latvia. It is located on the border with Belarus.
