= Krāslava Municipality =

Municipality of Latvia

Coordinates: 55.9000°N 27.1667°E

Krāslava Municipality Krāslavas novads
- Municipality
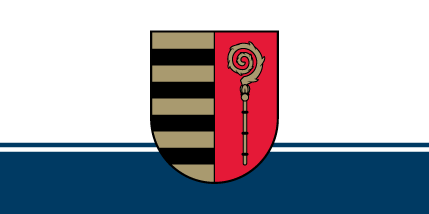
- Flag Coat of arms

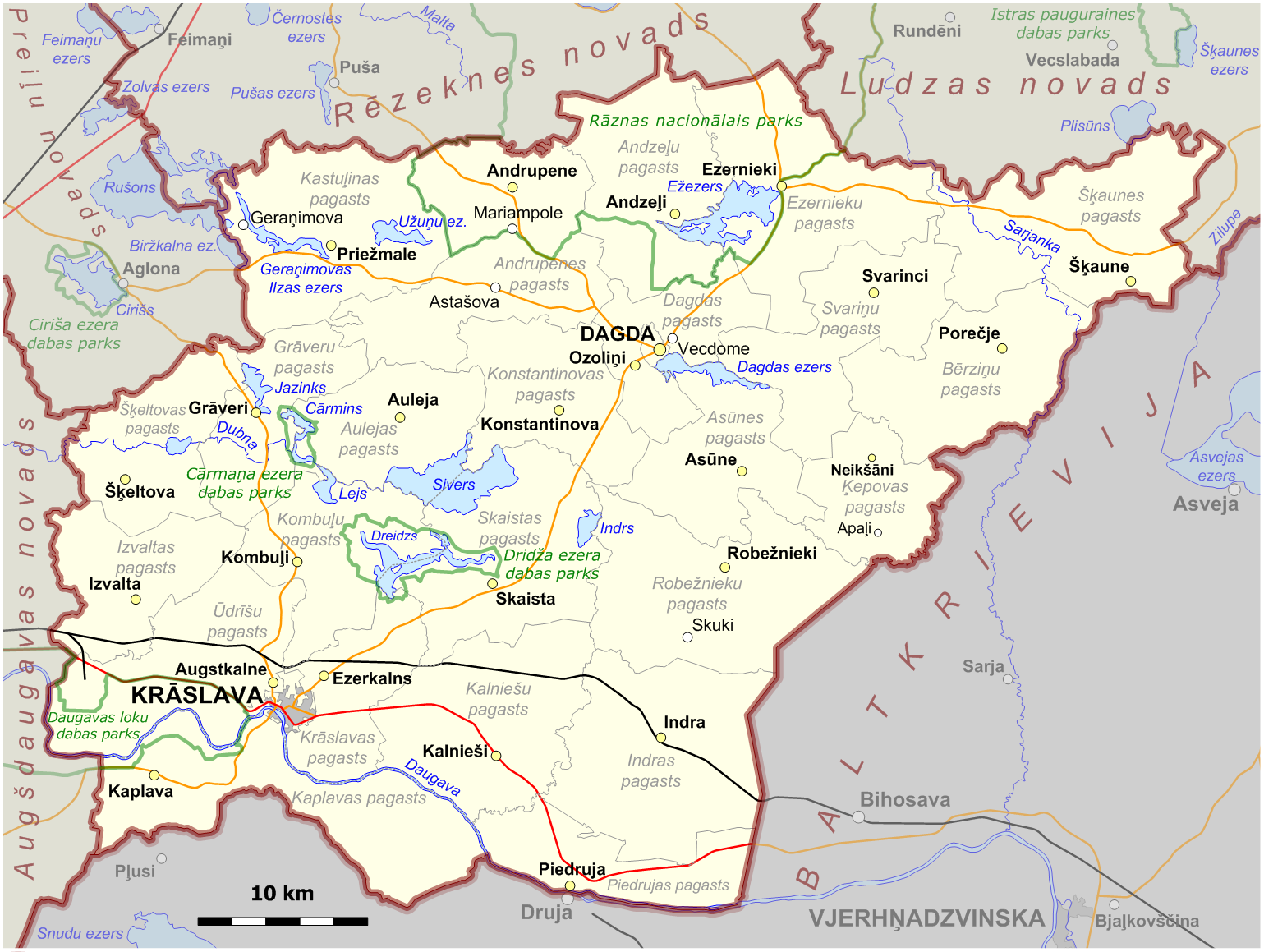
- Country: Latvia
- Formed: 2001
- Reformed: 2021
- Centre: Krāslava

Government
  - Council Chair: Gunārs Upenieks (LZS)

Area
  - Total: 2,288.84 km^{2} (883.73 sq mi)
  - Land: 2,138.80 km^{2} (825.80 sq mi)

Population (2026)
  - Total: 19,040
  - Density: 8.902/km^{2} (23.06/sq mi)
- Website: www.kraslava.lv

Krāslava Municipality (Latvian: Krāslavas novads, Latgalian: Kruoslovys nūvods) is a municipality in Latgale, Latvia. The municipality was formed in 2001 by merging Krāslava Parish and Krāslava town. In 2009 it absorbed Auleja Parish, Indra Parish, Izvalta Parish, Kalnieši Parish, Kaplava Parish, Kombuļi Parish, Piedruja Parish, Robežnieki Parish, Skaista Parish and Ūdrīši Parish town. The administrative centre of the municipality is Krāslava.

On 1 July 2021, Krāslava Municipality was enlarged when the territory of the former Dagda Municipality and three parishes of the former Aglona Municipality were merged into it.

== Demographics ==
=== Ethnic composition ===
As of 1 January 2010 the ethnic composition of the municipality is as follows:

| Ethnic group | Number | % |
|---|---|---|
| Latvians, including Latgalians | 8878 | 44,43 % |
| Russians | 4376 | 21,90 % |
| Belarusians | 4215 | 21,09 % |
| Poles | 1672 | 8,37 % |
| Ukrainians | 271 | 1,36 % |
| Others | 571 | 2,86 % |

== Notable people ==
- August Kościesza-Żaba (in 1801 in Krāslava Municipality – 1894), a Polish orientalist and diplomat in Russian service.
- Józef Broel-Plater (1890 in Kombuļi Parish – 1941), a Polish bobsledder, competed in the four-man event at the 1928 Winter Olympics
- Wessel Freytag von Loringhoven (1899 in Groß Born Manor – 1944), a Baltic German colonel in the High Command of the German Armed Forces
- Oļegs Andrejevs (born 1980 in Krāslava Municipality), a cross-country skier, competed in the men's sprint event at the 2006 Winter Olympics

== See also ==
- Lake Drīdzis
