= First ladies and gentlemen of Latvia =

Spouse of the President of Latvia

First ladies and gentleman of Latvia
- Current; Vacant since July 8, 2023
- Style: Mr. or Mrs.
- Residence: Riga Castle
- Inaugural holder: Justīne Čakste (as first lady); Imants Freibergs (as first gentleman)
- Formation: December 17, 1918 (107 years ago)

The first lady of Latvia or first gentleman it is an informal title held by the spouse of the president of Latvia, coinciding with his or her term in office. Although the role of the president's spouse has never been officially codified or defined, it holds a prominent place in Latvian social life. The First Lady or First Gentleman of Latvia traditionally acts as the host of Riga Castle.

Traditionally, when the president is single or widowed, the typical organizational duties of the host are filled by a staff member, while the role remains vacant. The role of the spouse of the president is an informal title. Her duties are generally to accompany the president, without exerting any influence on his policy decisions.

== List of first ladies and gentlemen of Latvia ==
PL No.	Portrait	Name	Tenure	Age at tenure start	President (Husband, unless noted)
1		Justīne Čakste; 28 November 1870 – 28 April 1954 (aged 83)	17 December 1918 – 14 March 1927	48 years, 19 days	Jānis Čakste
2		Emīlija Zemgals; 14 March 1880 – 7 July 1928 (aged 48)	8 April 1927 – 7 July 1928	47 years, 25 days	Gustavs Zemgals
2	Vacant		7 July 1928 – 8 April 1930	Vacant	Gustavs Zemgals; Widower
3		Elza Kviesis; 22 July 1887 – 20 February 1962 (aged 74)	8 April 1930 – 11 April 1936	42 years, 260 days	Alberts Kviesis
4	Vacant		11 April 1936 – 21 July 1940	Vacant	Kārlis Ulmanis; Single
5		Aina Ulmane; Born September 20, 1939 (age 86)	7 July 1993 – 7 July 1999	53 years, 290 days	Guntis Ulmanis m. 1962
6		Imants Freibergs; 12 March 1934 – 1 January 2026 (aged 91)	8 July 1999 – 8 July 2007	91 years, 295 days	Vaira Vīķe-Freiberga m. 1960
7		Lilita Zatlere; Birth country: Latvian SSR (present day Latvia); Born February 24, 1953 (age 73)	8 July 2007 – 8 July 2011	54 years, 134 days	Valdis Zatlers m. 1963
8		Dace Seisuma; Birth country: Latvian SSR (present day Latvia); Born January 10, 1973 (age 53)	8 July 2011 – 8 July 2015	38 years, 179 days	Andris Bērziņš m. 2011
9		Iveta Vējone; Birth country: Latvian SSR (present day Latvia); Born July 4, 1966 (age 60)	8 July 2015 – 8 July 2019	49 years, 4 days	Raimonds Vējonis m. 1986
10		Andra Levite; Birth country: West Germany (present day Germany); Born November 16, 1962 (age 63)	8 July 2019 – 8 July 2023	56 years, 234 days	Egils Levits m. 1991
11	Vacant		8 July 2023 – Vacant	Vacant	Edgars Rinkēvičs; Single
