= 2011 Latvian presidential election =

← 2007	June 2, 2011	2015 →
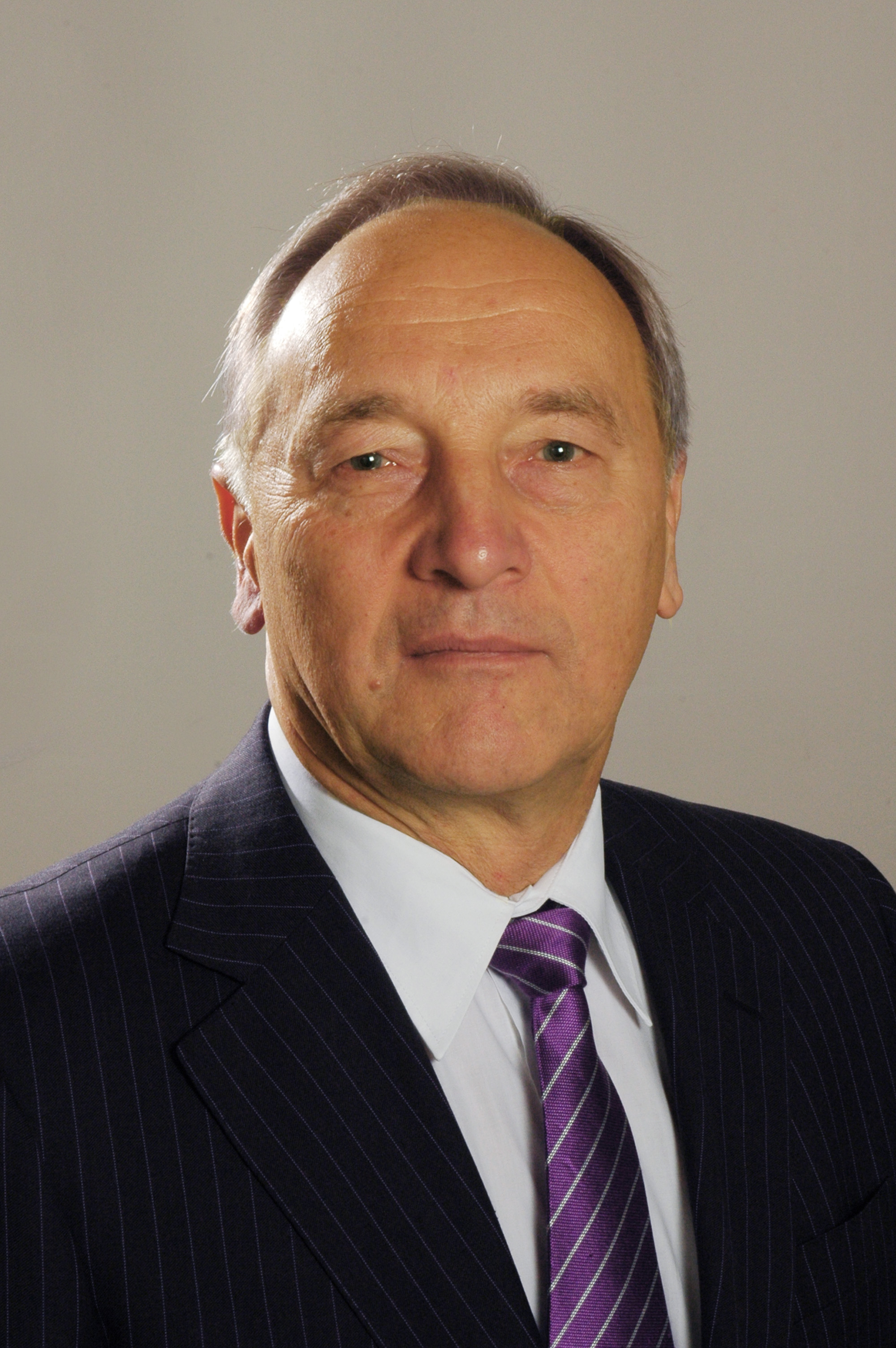

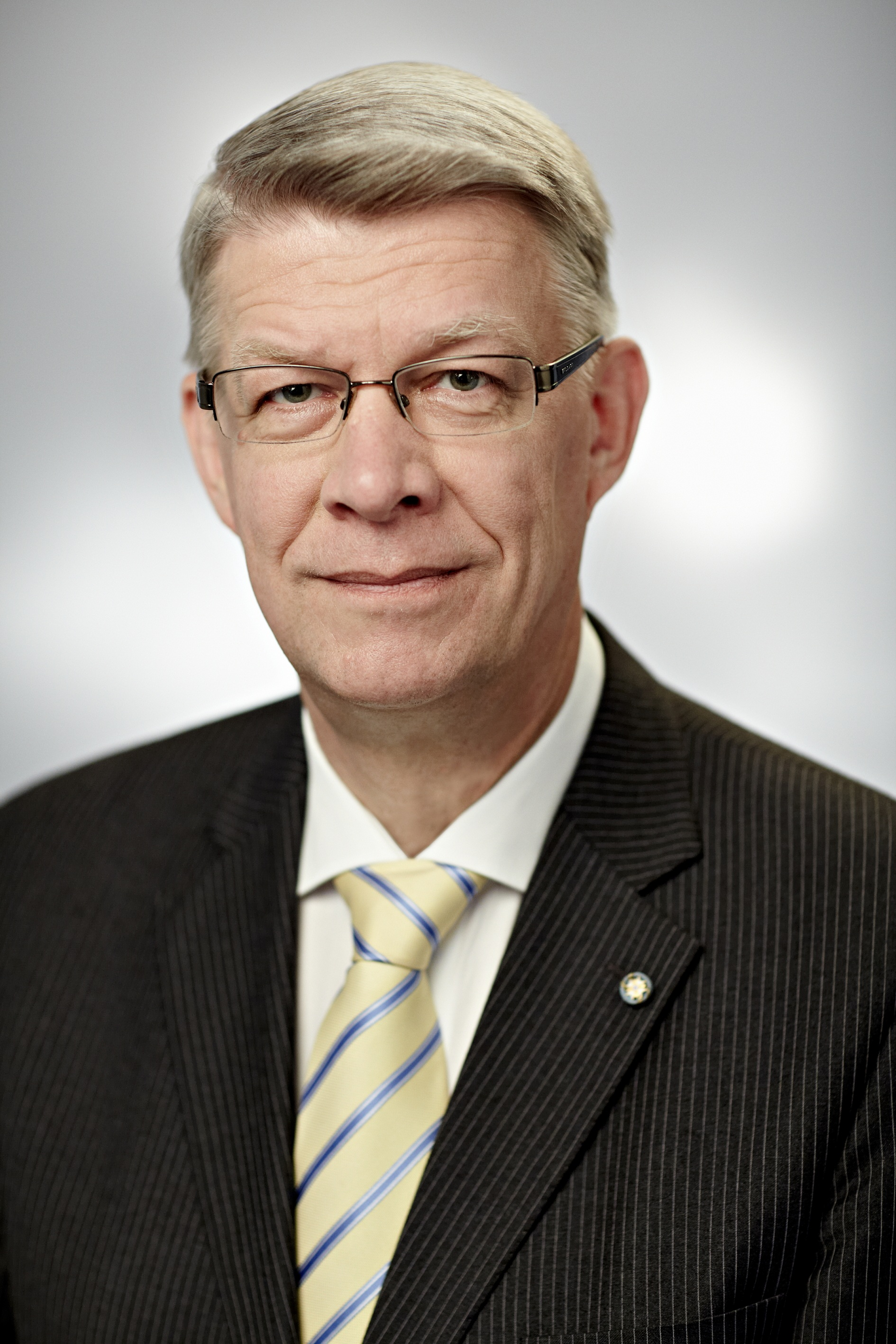
Candidate	Andris Bērziņš	Valdis Zatlers
Electoral vote	53	41
President of Latvia before election
Valdis Zatlers
Elected President of Latvia
Andris Bērziņš

Indirect presidential elections were held in Latvia on 2 June 2011. Incumbent president Valdis Zatlers was standing again, as well as Andris Bērziņš (Saeima member for the Union of Greens and Farmers), a former head of SEB Unibanka (not to be confused with Andris Bērziņš, former PM from Latvia's First Party/Latvian Way); Bērziņš was nominated by five Saeima members of the Union of Greens and Farmers just two days before the nomination deadline, although the party was assumed to back Zatlers for re-election.

In the first round, Bērziņš got 50 votes in favour and 48 against, while Zatlers got 43 in favour and 55 against (99 lawmakers cast votes, but one was invalid), meaning none was elected; a second round was held later on the same day, with Bērziņš winning the election 53 to 44 votes in favour; Zatlers got 41 to 56 votes.

Analysts attributed Valdis Zatlers’ defeat in the 2011 Latvian presidential election to his decision to call Latvia’s first parliamentary dissolution referendum on 28 May 2011. This decision was seen as a bold move against corruption, but it also created significant political tension and controversy.
