= 2015 Latvian presidential election =

Election in Latvia

| ← 2011 | June 3, 2015 | 2019 → |
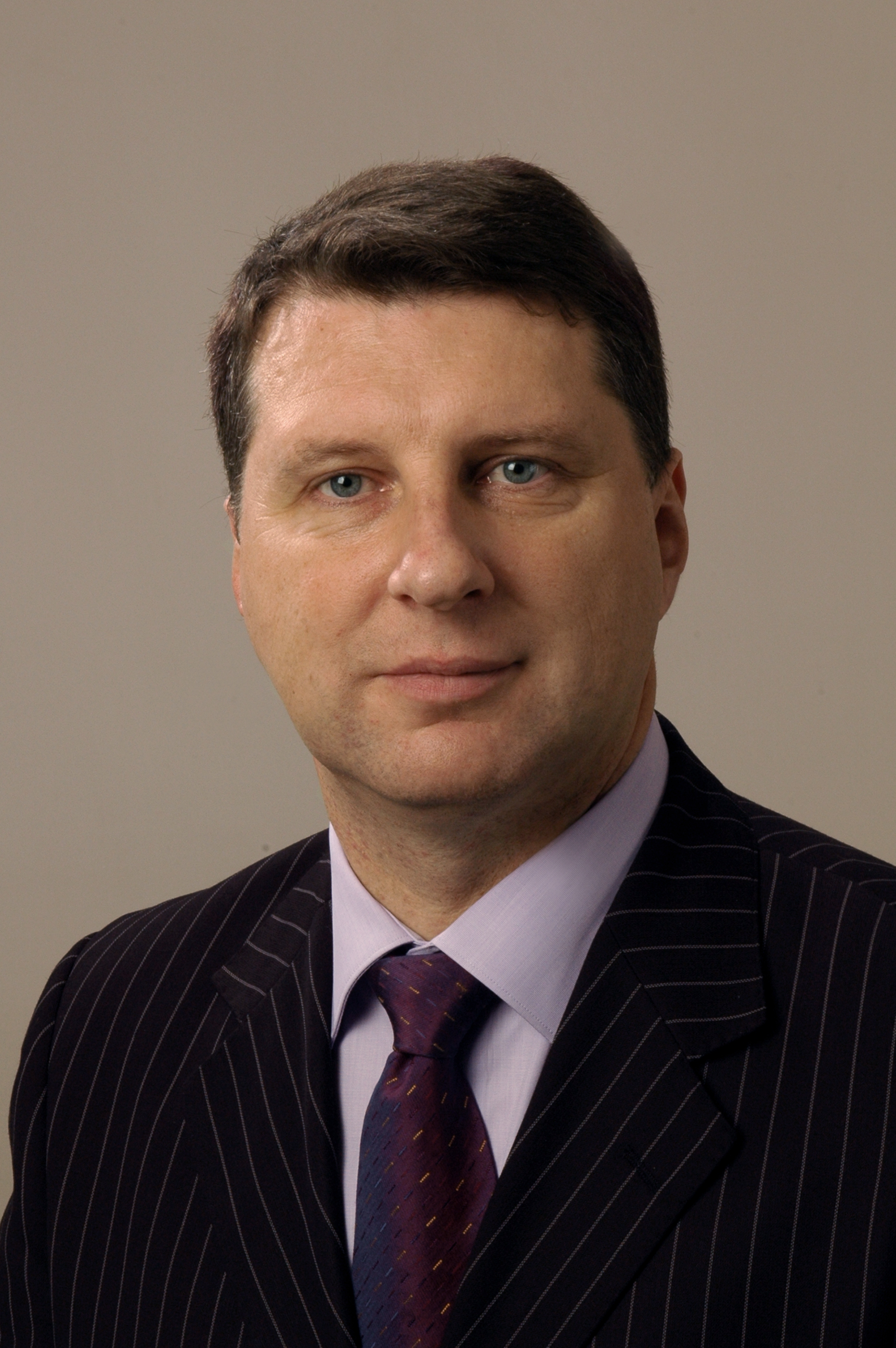

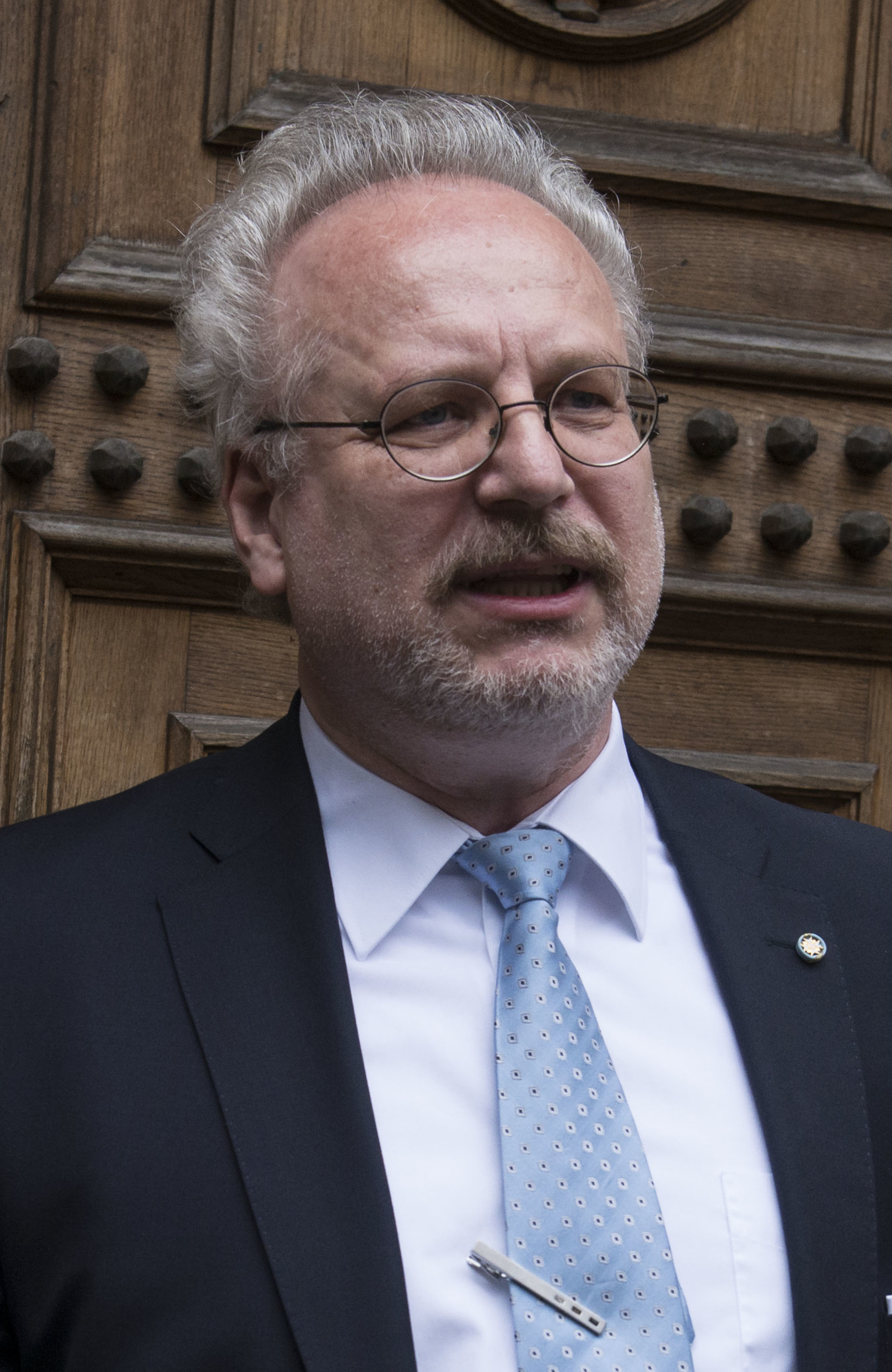
| Candidate | Raimonds Vējonis | Egils Levits |
| Electoral vote | 55 | 42 |
President of Latvia before election
Andris Bērziņš
Elected President of Latvia
Raimonds Vējonis

Indirect presidential elections were held in Latvia on 3 June 2015. Raimonds Vējonis of the Green Party was elected President and took office on 8 July. According to the European Green Party, he is the first of their members to become a head of state of a European Union member state.

== Election ==
Incumbent Andris Bērziņš announced in April 2015 that he would not seek a second term.

The ruling coalition failed to agree on a joint candidate, with the Union of Greens and Farmers nominating Defence Minister Raimonds Vējonis (who also had the support of most of Unity's MPs), while the National Alliance nominated European Court of Justice judge Egils Levits (who also had the support of Unity's Lolita Čigāne and For Latvia from the Heart's Ringolds Balodis).

Two opposition parties also nominated candidates – the Latvian Association of Regions nominated its MP Mārtiņš Bondars and the Social Democratic Party "Harmony" nominated its MP Sergejs Dolgopolovs.

In the first round of votes in the Saeima, no one was elected. In the second round, Mārtiņš Bondars received the fewest votes and was eliminated, and in the third round, Sergejs Dolgopolovs was eliminated. In the fourth round, the only candidates remaining were Egils Levits and Raimonds Vējonis. Levits got 26 votes for, Vējonis got 46 votes for. In the final round, Vējonis was elected with 55 votes for and 42 votes against (99 lawmakers voted in total, but one vote was invalid).

== Reactions ==
Vējonis stated that "I would like to improve relations with Russia... but while Russian rockets and heavy weapons remain in Ukraine, that's not really possible". He promised increasing national security while promoting environmentalism.

Prime Minister Laimdota Straujuma of Unity announced that she was pleased with the result.
