= 2011 Latvian parliamentary dissolution referendum =

23 July 2011
- Are you in favor of dismissing the 10th Saeima?

Results
Choice	Votes	%
Yes	650,518	94.50%
No	37,829	5.50%
Valid votes	688,347	99.79%
Invalid or blank votes	1,476	0.21%
Total votes	689,823	100.00%
Registered voters/turnout	1,542,593	44.72%

A referendum on whether the Saeima should be dissolved early was held in Latvia on 23 July 2011. President Valdis Zatlers used his parliamentary dissolution power for the first time in the history of Latvia. A "yes/no" vote was held and the referendum passed with 95% support.

== Background ==
President Valdis Zatlers called the referendum under the power given to him by the constitution on 28 May 2011. Zatlers called the referendum in response to the Saeima's refusal to sanction a search at the home of MP Ainārs Šlesers, leader of Latvia's First Party/Latvian Way and a former cabinet minister. According to the current legal procedure, the referendum on the Saeima's dissolution had to take place no later than two months after the President's decree.

The Constitution of Latvia foresaw that if the people had not supported Zatlers' decision, he would have had to resign from the presidency. This could have created a judicial conundrum, however, since Zatlers' current term expired on 7 July and the Saeima held a presidential election (in which Zatlers was also a candidate) on 2 June. As Zatlers was not reelected, however, this conundrum was avoided.

== Opinion polls ==
Polls indicated that the referendum would pass by a strong margin.

== Results ==
Choice	Votes	%
For	650,518	94.50
Against	37,829	5.50
Total	688,347	100.00
Valid votes	688,347	99.79
Invalid/blank votes	1,476	0.21
Total votes	689,823	100.00
Registered voters/turnout	1,542,593	44.72
Source: CVK
