= Inguna Sudraba =

Latvian politician

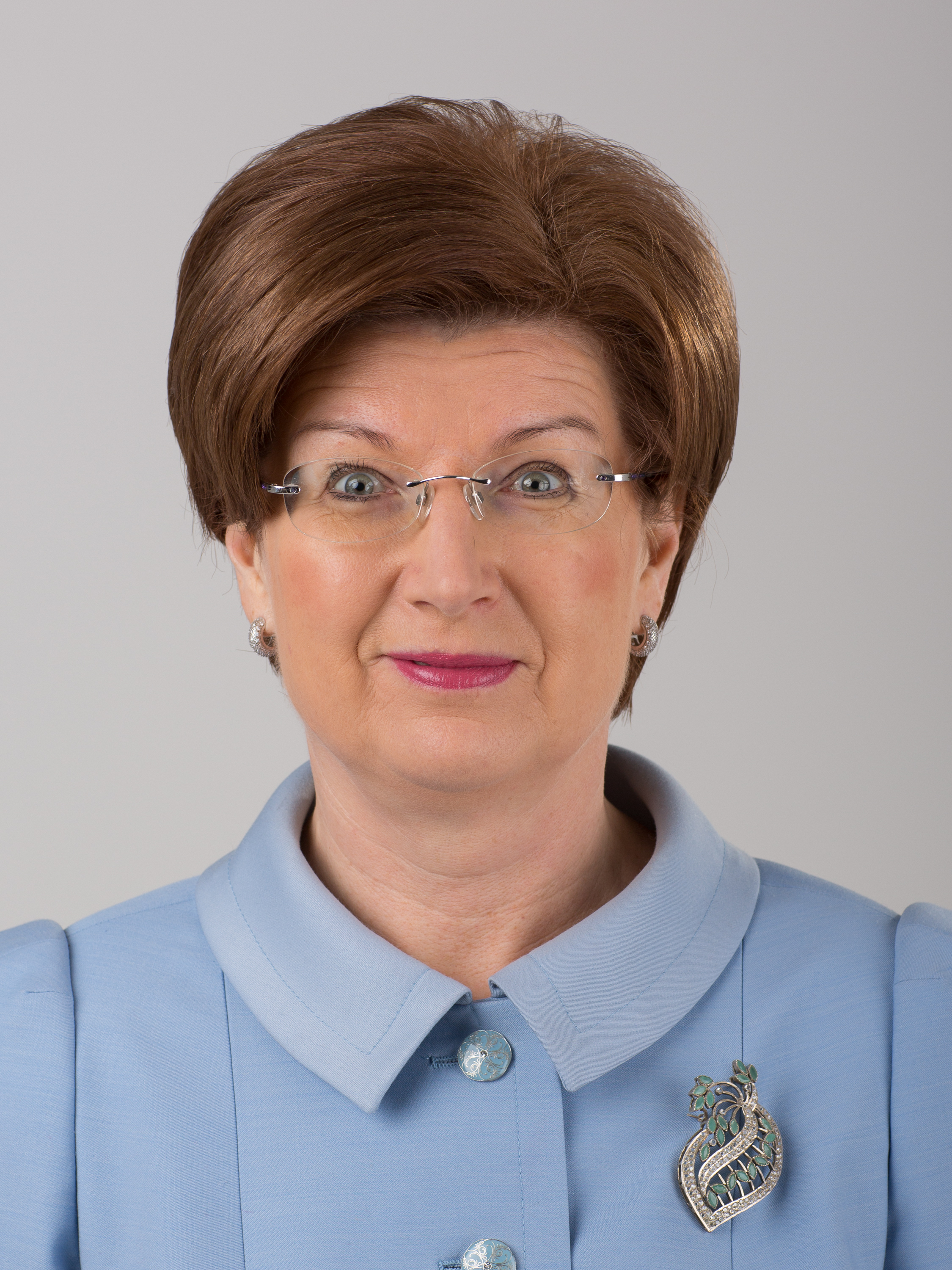

Member of the 12th Saeima
- In office November 4, 2014 – November 6, 2018
- President: Raimonds Vējonis; Andris Bērziņš
- Prime Minister: Māris Kučinskis; Laimdota Straujuma

Auditor-General of Latvia
- In office December 2004 – January 2013
- Preceded by: Raits Černajs
- Succeeded by: Elita Krūmiņa

Personal details
- Born: 21 November 1964 (age 61) Gulbene, Latvian SSR, Soviet Union
- Party: Awakening (2019–2020)
- Other political affiliations: For Latvia from the Heart (2014–2019)
- Education: Pēteris Stučka Latvian State University (1988)
- Profession: Economist

Inguna Sudraba (born 21 November 1964) is a Latvian politician.

Inguna Sudraba graduated from the University of Latvia in 1988 with a degree in economic planning. From July 1994 through June 2003 she was deputy finance minister for Latvia. From December 2004 through January 2013 Inguna Sudraba was auditor general in the State Auditing Office of Latvia. In May 2014 she became leader of the new political party For Latvia from the Heart.

Government offices
Preceded by Raits Černajs	Auditor General of Latvia; 2004 – 2013	Succeeded by Elita Krūmiņa
