= Mārtiņš Bondars =

Latvian politician (born 1971)

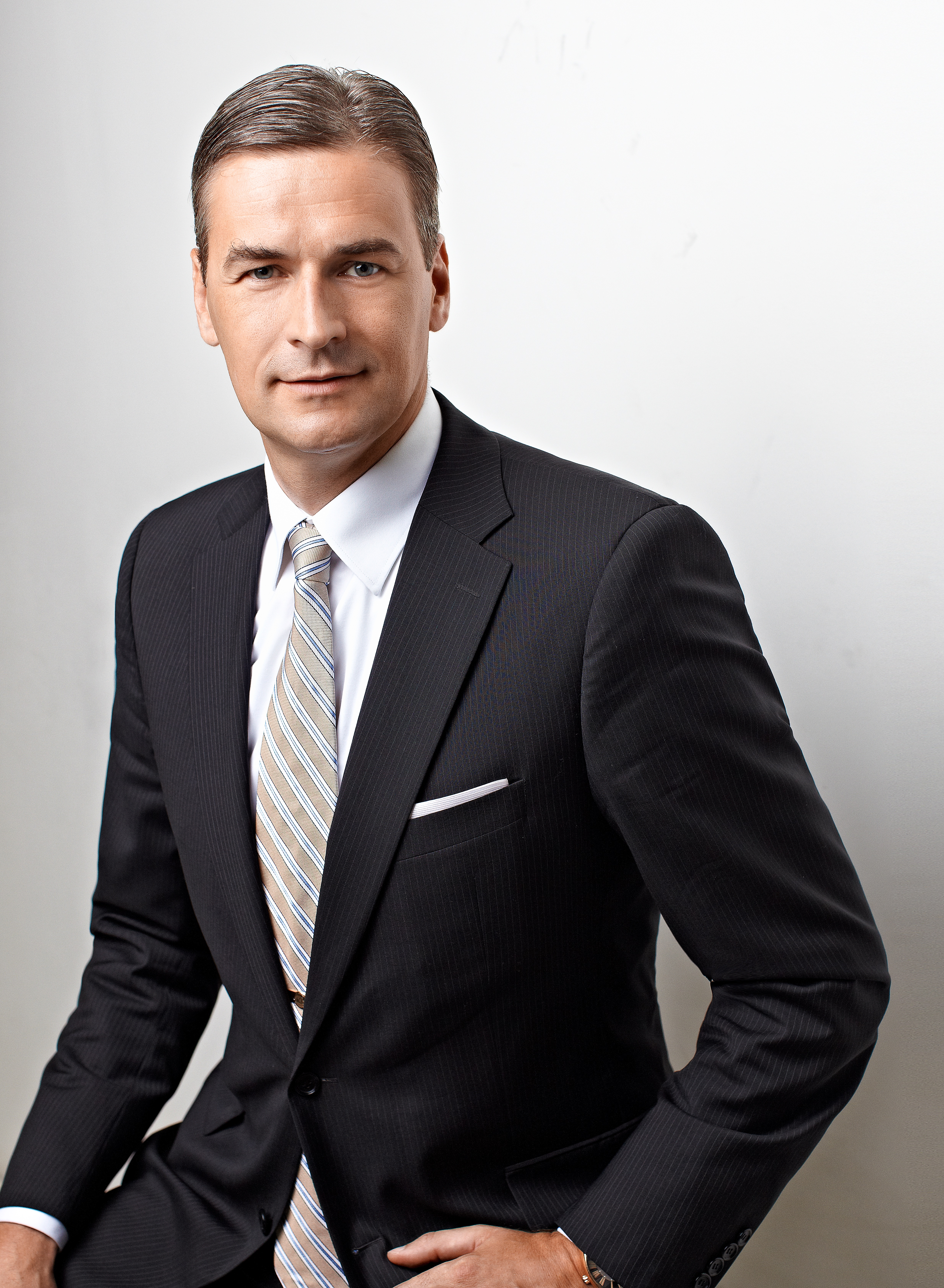
- Mārtiņš Bondars in 2014

Member of the 12th Saeima
- Incumbent
- Assumed office 2014

Personal details
- Born: December 31, 1971 (age 54)
- Party: TB/LNNK (2000-2002); Latvian Association of Regions (2014-2017); For Latvia's Development (since 2018)
- Spouse: Ieva Bondare
- Education: University of Latvia (1991–1993); Lakeland College (1994–1996); Harvard University (2011)

Mārtiņš Bondars (born 31 December 1971) is a Latvian financier and politician. He has been a member of the Latvian parliament since 2014. Bondars previously served as chief of staff to then President of Latvia Vaira Vīķe-Freiberga and chairman of the Latvijas Krājbanka board (until 2009).

He was the leader of the Latvian Association of Regions and a member of its constituent party, the Regional Alliance. He participated in the Latvian presidential elections in 2015 as the nominee of his alliance. On July 28, 2017 he quit his post as the head of the Regional Alliance, protesting the party's decision to support Inguna Sudraba as head of the recently established parliamentary committee investigating the so-called "oligarch transcripts". On December 18 Bondars also left the alliance. In 2018, he joined their former allies during the 2017 Riga City Council elections, the party For Latvia's Development.
