= Imants Freibergs =

Latvian computer scientist (1934–2026)

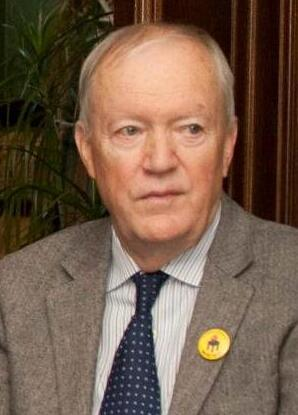
- Freibergs in 2012

First Gentleman of Latvia
- In role 8 July 1999 – 8 July 2007
- President: Vaira Vīķe-Freiberga
- Preceded by: Aina Ulmane (as first lady)
- Succeeded by: Lilita Zatlere (as first lady)

Personal details
- Born: 12 March 1934 Valmiera, Latvia
- Died: 1 January 2026 (aged 91) Riga, Latvia
- Spouse: Vaira Vīķe-Freiberga (m. 1960)
- Children: Kārlis Freibergs; Indra Freiberga
- Education: University of Toronto

Imants Freibergs (12 March 1934 – 1 January 2026) was a Latvian computer scientist and professor. A member of the Latvian Academy of Sciences, he was a recipient of the Order of the Three Stars in 2007, and was the first gentleman of Latvia from 1999 to 2007. Married to the president of Latvia, Vaira Vīķe-Freiberga, who was the first woman in the office, and the first independent candidate for president in a Latvian presidential election, Freibergs was the first gentleman of the country.

Freibergs died on 1 January 2026 in Riga, at the age of 91.

Honorary titles
Preceded by Aina Ulmane as First Lady	First Gentleman of Latvia; 1999–2007	Succeeded by Lilita Zatlere as First Lady
