= Aivars Endziņš =

Latvian politician (1940–2023)

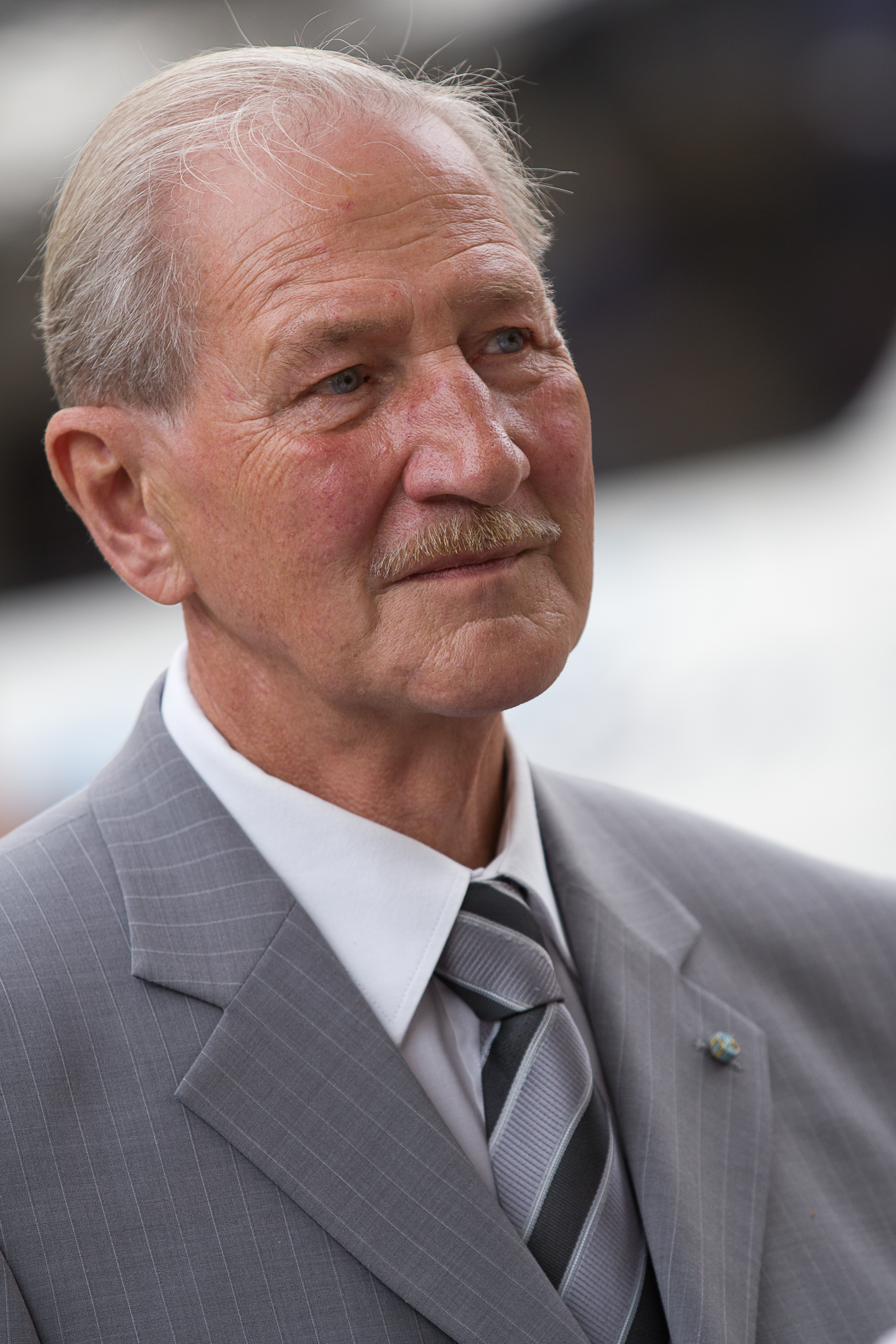
- Endziņš in 2011
- Born: 8 December 1940; Rīga, Latvian SSR, USSR (now Latvia)
- Died: 21 November 2023 (aged 82)
- Education: University of Latvia
- Occupations: Lawyer, politician

Aivars Endziņš (8 December 1940 – 21 November 2023) was a Latvian lawyer and politician. He graduated from the University of Latvia in 1968 and in 1977 attained a candidate of legal sciences degree. In 1997 he became a Doctor of Jurisprudence. He has worked as a lecturer at the University of Latvia and at the Turība School of Business Administration. He was a member of the Communist Party of the Soviet Union from 1963 to 1990, when he became a member of the Popular Front of Latvia and a member of the Supreme Council of the Republic of Latvia. He was for a short time a member of Latvian Social Democratic Workers' Party, and in 1993 became a member of Latvian Way. He was a member of the 5th and 6th Saeimas, but resigned in 1996 to become a judge on the Constitutional Court of Latvia. He became the Chief Justice of the Constitutional Court in 2000 and left this office in 2007. He was a presidential candidate in the 2007 Latvian presidential election, nominated by Harmony Centre and supported by the New Era Party and the political alliance For Human Rights in a United Latvia. After a passionate debate over his membership of the Communist Party, which included a revelation that in the 1970s he had denied the occupation of Latvia, he lost the election to Valdis Zatlers.

Endziņš died on 21 November 2023, at the age of 82.
