= Elita Krūmiņa =

Latvian economist (born 1965)

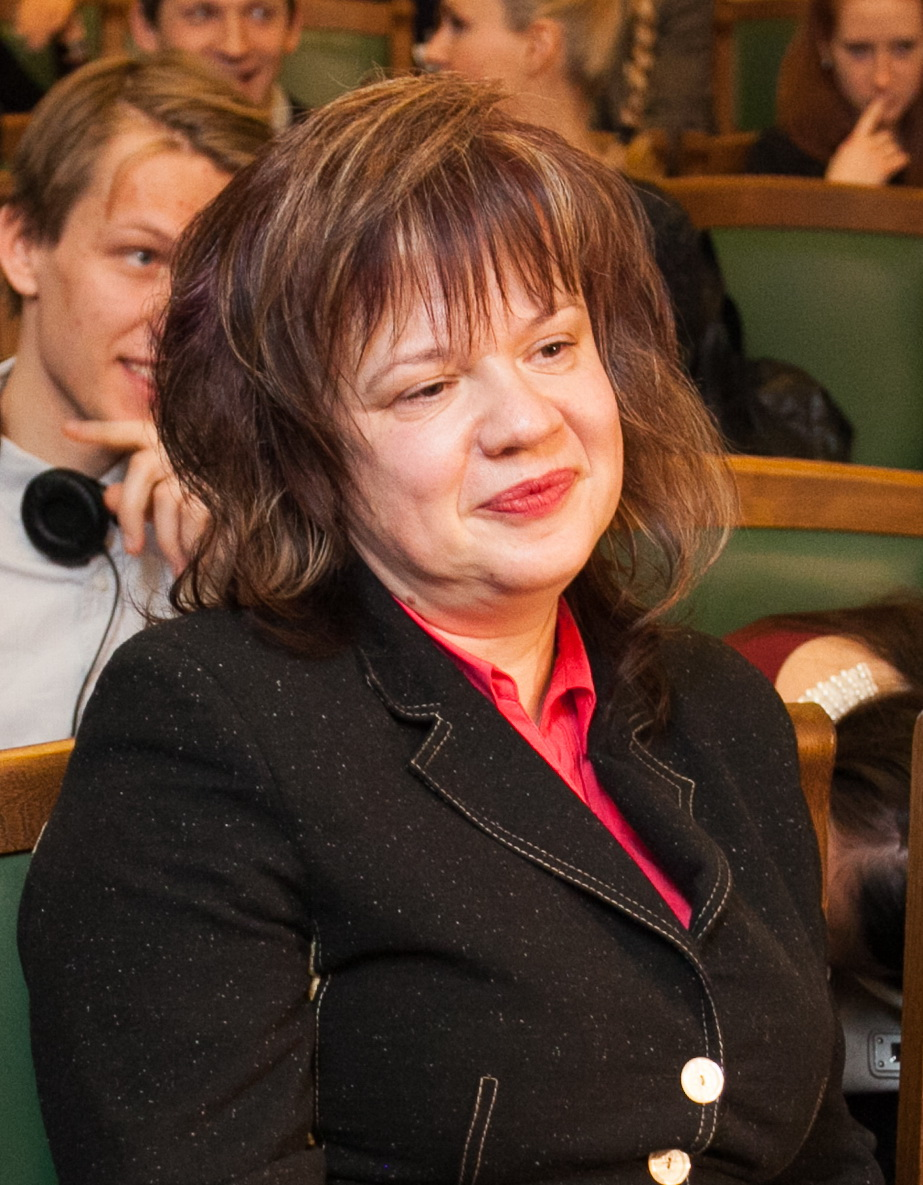
- Elita Krūmiņa in 2013

Auditor-General of Latvia
- In office 2013 – 2021
- Preceded by: Inguna Sudraba
- Succeeded by: Rolands Irklis

Personal details
- Born: November 21, 1965 (age 60) Jelgava, Latvian SSR, Soviet Union
- Education: Pēteris Stučka Latvian State University
- Profession: Economist

Elita Krūmiņa (born 21 November 1965 in Jelgava) is a former auditor general of Latvia, having served from 21 January 2013 to 27 January 2021. Prior to becoming auditor general, Krūmiņa was a member of the council of Latvia's state audit office; she became a member in 2005 after spending six years at the Latvian Ministry of Finance.

Government offices
| Preceded by Inguna Sudraba | Auditor General of Latvia; 2013 – 2021 | Succeeded by Rolands Irklis |
