= Agate Nesaule =

Latvian writer

- Agate Nesaule, from the 1956 yearbook of Shortridge High School
- Born: January 23, 1938; Nītaure, Latvia
- Died: June 29, 2022 (aged 84); Madison, Wisconsin
- Other names: Agate Nesaule Krouse
- Occupations: Writer, college professor
- Notable work: Woman in Amber (1995)
- Awards: American Book Award (1996)

Agate Nesaule (January 23, 1938 – June 29, 2022) was a Latvian-born American writer and professor of English on the faculty of the University of Wisconsin–Whitewater. Her 1995 memoir A Woman in Amber won the American Book Award from the Before Columbus Foundation in 1996.

== Early life and education ==
Nesaule was born in Nītaure, Latvia, as the daughter of Peteris V. Nesaule and Valda Nesaule. Her father was a Lutheran minister; her mother earned a Ph.D in her seventies. As a little girl, Nesaule fled the wartime upheaval with her family, and spent time as a child prisoner in Germany during World War II. The family lived in a displaced persons camp, and moved to the United States in 1950, when she was 12 years old.

Nesaule attended Shortridge High School, and won a statewide Latin competition in Indiana; the prize was a four-year scholarship to Indiana University Bloomington. She earned a bachelor's and a master's degree at Indiana, and completed doctoral studies in English at the University of Wisconsin–Madison. Her dissertation was titled "The Feminism of Doris Lessing" (1972).

== Career ==
Nesaule was a professor of English at the University of Wisconsin Whitewater from 1963 to 1996. She and Ruth Schauer founded the school's women's studies program in 1972. Her memoir A Woman in Amber: Healing the Trauma of War and Exile (1995) won the American Book Award in 1996. She also published two novels, and academic articles.

In 1998, Nesaule was an invited guest when President Bill Clinton signed the agreement required to allow Latvia, Lithuania, and Estonia to join NATO. In 2019, she wrote in an essay, "I have lived in the United States for 70 years. I am an American citizen in love with the Declaration of Independence and the Constitution. I am immensely grateful for all that this country has given me, yet I feel I do not really belong here."

== Publications ==
- "A Doris Lessing Checklist" (1973)
- "Women and Crime: Sexism in Allingham, Sayers, and Christie" (1974, with Margot Peters)
- "Why Women Kill" (1975, with Margot Peters)
- "Doris Lessing's Feminist Plays" (1976)
- "Murder in Academe" (1977, with Margot Peters)
- "What Happened to Aspazija? In Search of Feminism in Latvia" (1993)
- A Woman in Amber: Healing the Trauma of War and Exile (1995)
- In Love with Jerzy Kosinski: A Novel (2010)
- "Feminism and Art in Fay Weldon's Novels" (2013)
- Lost Midsummers: A Novel of Women's Friendship in Exile (2019)
- "Exile is irreversible" (2019)

== Personal life ==
Nesaule married a fellow English professor, Harry Krouse. They had a son, Boris. They divorced. She died in Madison, Wisconsin in 2022, at the age of 84.
