= Iveta Vējone =

First Lady of Latvia from 2015 to 2019

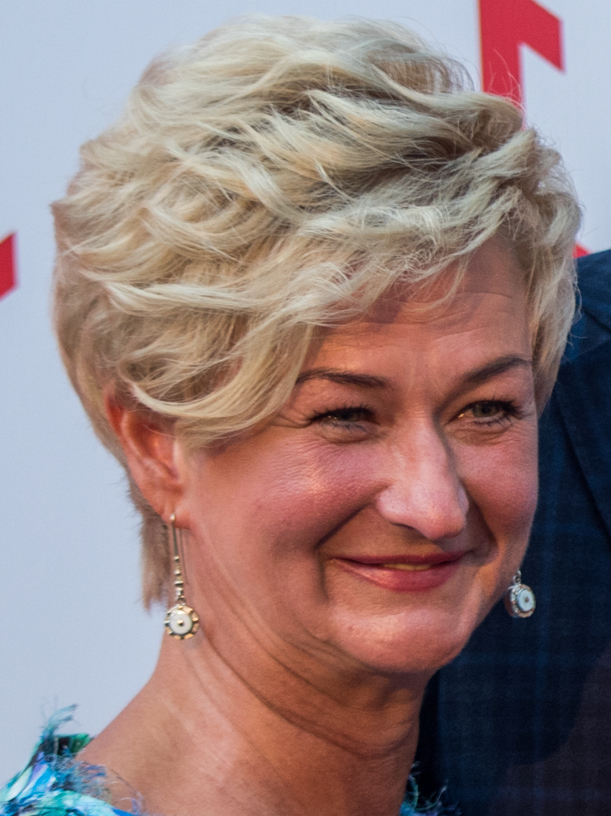
- Vējone in 2017

First Lady of Latvia
- In role 8 July 2015 – 8 July 2019
- President: Raimonds Vējonis
- Preceded by: Dace Seisuma
- Succeeded by: Andra Levite

Personal details
- Born: Iveta Sivoha; 4 July 1966 (age 58); Madona, Latvian SSR, Soviet Union
- Spouse: Raimonds Vējonis (m. 1986)
- Children: Two sons
- Occupation: Teacher

Iveta Vējone (born 4 July 1966) is a Latvian teacher who served as the first lady of Latvia from 2015 to 2019. She is the wife of former president of Latvia Raimonds Vējonis.

== Honours ==
- Estonia: First Class of the Order of the Cross of Terra Mariana (2 April 2019)
- Netherlands: Grand Cross of the Order of the Crown (11 June 2018)
