= A Woman in Amber =

1995 memoir by Agate Nesaule

A Woman in Amber: Healing the Trauma of War and Exile
- First edition
- Author: Agate Nesaule
- Language: English
- Publisher: Soho Press
- Publication date: 1995
- Publication place: United States
- Media type: Print (hardback & paperback)
- Pages: 280 pp
- ISBN: 978-0-14-026190-5
- OCLC: 36163412
- Preceded by: N/A
- Followed by: N/A

A Woman in Amber: Healing the Trauma of War and Exile is a memoir written by Agate Nesaule. The first half of the memoir describes Nesaule’s experiences as a refugee when the Soviet army invaded Latvia; of the terrors of war and life in the displaced persons' camps in Germany; and her family's emigration to the United States in 1950.

The second half of the memoir describes Nesaule’s experiences in the United States. Through Nesaule’s memoir, the reader becomes acquainted with the Latvian community in Indianapolis during the 1950s. The memoir also explores the experience of immigration as seen from Nesaule’s point of view: that of a teenage girl in the 1950s. By the end of the memoir, Nesaule is able to heal from the harmful experiences of war and exile, which affected her life at such a young age.

== Plot summary ==
A Woman in Amber begins with Agate Nesaule as an adult. She is a successful professor of Women’s Studies and 20th century English Literature at the University of Wisconsin-Whitewater. Despite her outward professional success, Agate lives with an inner turmoil caused by her memories of war and perpetuated by her husband, Joe. Nesaule goes into therapy, depressed and unable to come to terms with the root cause of her depression. On the advice of her therapist Ingeborg, Agate learns she cannot begin to heal until she is able to tell her story: what happened to her and her family during World War II in Latvia and Germany at the hands of the invading Russian soldiers.

She eventually admits to her therapist that she was in Germany after the war and that she was starving. From this revelation, she goes on to tell how she was prompted by her mother to beg from the Russian soldiers, in Russian, not Latvian, for food. Later in life, she mistakenly tells this same story to her husband, Joe. He mocks her and suggests that when she was forced to beg for food, she enjoyed it. Agate remembers that the Russians looked at her as if she were a goose singing. The shame of going hungry led her to believe she was not worth feeding.

When Mongolian and Russian soldiers arrive, her father is forced to leave the family. The women and young girls are taken to a basement where the women are repeatedly raped. Agate is young enough to escape this, but her fifteen-year-old cousin, Astrida, must hide under straw and a blanket. Agate’s mother, Valda, is understandably terrified by the Russian occupation and the horrors that occur in the basement. The soldiers force the women and girls outside. Everyone believes they are to be executed. Valda tries to pull Agate with her to the front of the line of those to be shot. Valda says that if she and Agate are first, they will not have to see the others die. Agate does not wish to die; Agate resists. The struggle Agate has with her mother that day remains a constant tension between the two.

Agate is unable to see Valda’s love for her in her wish to save her from witnessing executions. Later, the reader comes to see that Valda did care deeply for Agate and loved her very much; particularly in Valda’s description of her desire to prepare Agate for her wedding day, a preparation Valda was denied. Unfortunately for Valda and Agate, the trauma of war and their shared experiences left no time to reconcile before Valda’s death. But Agate is able to reconcile with her mother after the latter's death.

Agate and her family eventually escape to Berlin where they are admitted to a Displaced Persons' camp. Here they receive food and shelter. The family moves many times during the next several years, going from camp to camp. Agate attends Latvian school while in the camps.

At age twelve, Agate and her family leave the camps and emigrate to the United States. We learn of Agate's life in the United States and her parents' financial struggle. Agate must adapt to life rapidly in the United States. A quick learner, Agate teaches herself English in one summer by translating Margaret Mitchell’s Gone with the Wind. An excellent student, Agate receives scholarships to attend Indiana University. While there, she meets her future husband, Joe. Agate’s family disapproves of the marriage, and it increased the distance between Agate and her mother.

During the next twenty years, Agate receives her doctorate degree, has a son named Boris, and becomes a successful professor at the University of Wisconsin-Whitewater. Constantly living with Joe’s put downs, harassments, and minimization of the trauma she endured in the war, Agate hides her feelings of depression and tries to carry on with her life. Though they are separated for much of their adult life, Agate and her sister, Beate, rejoin when Beate’s husband, Uldis, dies alone and penniless from alcohol poisoning.

Despite living at a distance from the Latvian community in Indianapolis where her father remains active as a Lutheran minister, Agate retains a close tie to her Latvian heritage. When a friend asks what he may bring Agate from Latvia, she asks for some Latvian soil. Agate treasures an amber pendant, which her mother wore. John gives Agate a piece of amber set in gold. Because of his respectful and receptive listening, Agate tells John her story and finally finds acceptance.

== Major Themes ==
Immigration – The book highlights Agate’s experience of emigrating to America. We learn of the financial struggle her family faces when they arrive here and the burden they face in paying off their initial debt for housing. For many years, all members of the family work hard and do without. Agate writes about the living conditions and the dangerous neighborhoods the family had to live in. Agate’s mother, a skilled teacher in Latvia, had to work long hours as a dishwasher to support her family.

Exile – Valda is a Latvian who grew up in Russia. Once in Latvia, Valda and her young family are forced into exile again; they bury their most prized possessions in the dirt. After five years in Germany, the family emigrates to the United States.

Education- The memoir highlights the importance Latvians place on education, which is referenced in the memoir as “the riches of the heart." As a child, Agate feels second to her mother's interest in books. In the camps, Latvians organize schools to continue teaching the children in spite of the current situation. When the family is ready to leave the camps, their destination is either South America or America. Agate’s mother insists they go to the United States so that Agate and Beate can receive their education. Valada continues her education, receiving a PhD at 70.

Comparing Trauma – In Woman In Amber, Nesaule references Jerzy Kosinski’s book The Painted Bird, in several places. She compares her own experience with the experience described by Kosinski. Nesaule concludes what was faced by Kosinki was worse than the trauma she experienced. The concept of comparing trauma is also present in a Latvian community program in which the question of who suffers more in war is discussed. Is suffering greater in the men who are wounded or the women who are raped?

Songs- Singing is important in Latvian culture. In the orphanage, the women join to sing. Their singing has a hypnotic effect on the soldiers which keeps them from raping the women.

Cultural Literacy- Cultural literacy is defined as being literate in a culture’s written material as well as being literate in the customs, traditions, and society of the culture. In the memoir, Agate becomes literate in American culture when she learns English and reads Gone with the Wind. From the books, movies, and people with whom she surrounds herself, she begins to learn the societal norms and expectations of her new culture.

The theme of healing is explored, along with private and public rituals of healing. Since Agate does not have an opportunity in her public space for healing, she must turn to an outlet in her private space. In discussing literature, public space means any area in which you are in the public, for example, at work, school, or out with friends. The private space means the space that your thoughts occupy. In her public space as a student, wife, and professor, Agate is unable to deal with her trauma. So, she has private rituals of healing in an attempt to deal with the trauma. These private rituals are a way for her to control the panic she experiences in her nightmares. Ultimately they are unsuccessful and only deepen her depression. She receives healing in the public space when she is able to tell her story to Ingeborg and John.

Tendency of the stronger members of society to prey on the weak- A Woman in Amber is full of instances describing characters in vulnerable positions at the mercy of those in power. The abuse of power Agate experiences in the war is seen in other circumstances throughout her life, even among those who are themselves victims. In the chapter describing the rapes that occur in the basement, Hilda, a woman who is raped repeatedly, is judged and isolated by the rest of the women in the basement. Although they too are victims of rape, they ease their own pain by ostracizing “othering” Hilda. Here the women gain power by judging Hilda.

When Joe meets Agate at Indiana University, he can tell she is vulnerable and needs his help to register for classes. It can be argued that it was Agate’s vulnerability that attracted Joe. Agate believed that if she stayed with Joe, he would save her if there were a war.

=== Reviews ===
From Library Journal: "A woman in amber is one trapped and preserved in her past. Nesaule (literature and women's studies, Univ. of Wisconsin) tells a moving story to promote the reader's understanding and her own healing. As a child in Latvia, she endured the terror and dislocation of World War II at the hands of both Soviets and Germans, lived in a postwar refugee camp, and became an immigrant to the American Midwest, establishing a life there shaped by survivor's guilt and a sense of victimization. Integral to her life are family relationships, especially estrangement from her mother, stemming from the war years and the author's own unhappy marriage. In middle age, Nesaule at last comes to terms with her past, builds a new life, and offers her audience a well-written and insightful memoir. For subject collections and general readers.", Rena Fowler, Humboldt State Univ., Arcata, Cal.Copyright 1995 Reed Business Information, Inc.

Diana Kiesners wrote in Latvians Online : "Above all, no one must know what happened to the women in the basement at Lobethal. When the local Latvian center holds a debate to establish who suffered more in the war, men or women, it is a foregone conclusion that it is the men who suffered most. They have the statistics to prove it. The few women who disagree (Agate’s mother is one of them) are shouted down; what are their losses by comparison? 'There are worse things than death,' they say, but the word ‘rape’ cannot be spoken. Otherwise they will be ostracized, blamed for their own tragedy. Agate puts up her hand to vote "with the winning side"".

== Literary Significance and Criticism ==
Haller, Evelyn. "A Woman in Amber: Healing the Trauma of War and Exile." The History Teacher 33.2 (2000): 276–77.

== Awards for A Woman in Amber ==
Winner of the 1996 American Book Award.

Named Outstanding Academic book by Choice. (Choice provides book reviews for university libraries)

Selected for Outstanding Achievement Recognition by the Wisconsin Library Association Literary Awards Committee.
