= Edmunds Sprūdžs =

Latvian politician (born 1980)

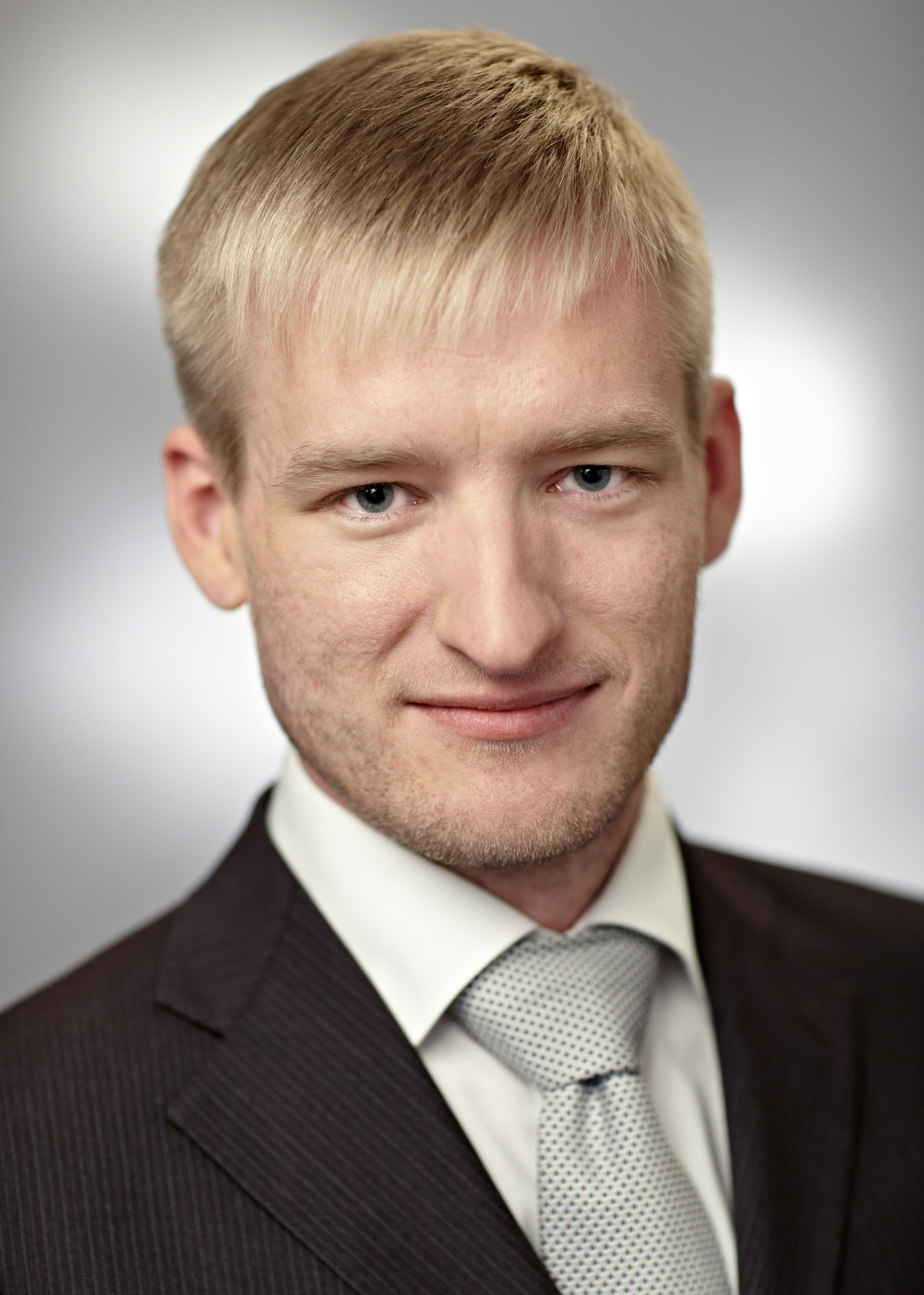

Minister for the Environmental Protection and Regional Development of Latvia
- In office 25 October 2011 – 1 December 2013
- Prime Minister: Valdis Dombrovskis
- Preceded by: Raimonds Vējonis
- Succeeded by: Einārs Cilinskis

Personal details
- Born: 21 June 1980 (age 45) Riga, Latvian SSR
- Party: Reform Party
- Profession: Businessman

Edmunds Sprūdžs (born 21 June 1980 in Riga) is a Latvian politician and businessman. He is the former Minister for the Environmental Protection and Regional Development of Latvia and a member of the Reform Party.

== Career ==
He was elected to the Saeima at the 2011 parliamentary election. He was the Reform Party's candidate for Prime Minister at the 2011 election.

Sprūdžs was appointed Minister for the Environmental Protection and Regional Development in October 2011.

As of 2017, he is known to be involved in various businesses at the center of "Small Wonderland" in Sigulda, where townships are modeled with train models drive on rails, miniature cars roll on the streets residential houses and depot buildings.
