= Nītaure Parish =

Parish of Latvia

- parish of Latvia
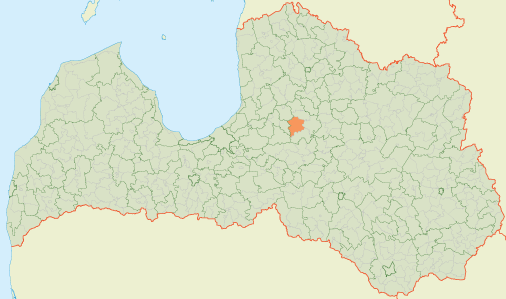
- 57°04′54″N 25°13′25″E

- Location within Latvia
- Country: Latvia

Area
  - Total: 173.65 km^{2} (67.05 sq mi)
  - Land: 169.45 km^{2} (65.43 sq mi)
  - Water: 4.2 km^{2} (1.6 sq mi)

Population (1 January 2026)
  - Total: 691
  - Density: 4.08/km^{2} (10.6/sq mi)

Nītaure Parish (Latvian: Nītaures pagasts) is an administrative territorial entity of Cēsis Municipality in the Vidzeme region of Latvia. The administrative center is Nītaure.

== Towns, villages and settlements of Nītaure Parish ==
- Merķeļi
- Nītaure
