= State Audit Office of the Republic of Latvia =

Government auditing body

The State Audit Office of the Republic of Latvia (SAO: Latvian: Latvijas Republikas Valsts Kontrole, LRVK) is a public auditing body overseeing the finances of national and local government in Latvia. It was first created in 1918, and re-established in 1992 when Latvia again became independent.

== Constitutional status ==
According to the Constitution and the Law on the State Audit Office, the State Audit Office is an independent, collegial supreme audit institution in the Republic of Latvia and is subject only to the law. Its task is to monitor the state and local government funds for legitimate, effective and efficient use of conducting audits in accordance with International Standards on Auditing.

== Functions ==
The main goal of the State Audit Office while conducting the audits in accordance with the international audit standards and international regulations of Supreme Audit Institutions is to assess whether the public property has been handled in lawful, compliant, efficient and effective way as well as to provide recommendations to address the found deficiencies.

According to the Law of the State Audit Office the audits can address the actions of any public person which has been responsible for handling of public finances. The audit can also address the actions of person which have carried out public procurements of state or local municipalities. The only state institution which is not a subject to the audits by the State Audit Office is the Parliament. In order to assure the independence of the institution the Audit Office has been granted with the rights to choose the auditee, the time, form and objectives of the audit.

The State Audit Office carries out financial, compliance and performance audits concerning:

- State and local governments and other derived public persons budget funds revenues and expenses, as well as capital companies with shares owned by the state, municipality or other public body. European Union and other international organizations or institutions use of resources, which are included in the state budget or local government budgets
- Actions by the state, local governments and other derived public persons, state and municipal companies, public private, limited liability private property.

== International cooperation and standards ==
The State Audit Office has been actively involved within organizations for international cooperation of Supreme Audit Institutions. Since 17 October 1994, the State Audit Office of the Republic of Latvia is a full-fledged member of the International Organization of Supreme Audit Institutions (INTOSAI), and since 9 May 1995 also a member of the European Organisation of Supreme Audit Institutions (EUROSAI). Membership in these organizations for professional cooperation provides an opportunity to exchange experiences and best practice, thus vastly improving the performance of the State Audit Office.

The SAO functions in accordance with the organizational documents of the supreme audit institutions, with the purpose of strengthening the working principles of the supreme audit institutions, including questions related to the carrying out audits, as well as setting the requirement to assure independence of the supreme audit institutions. According to the Lima Declaration the Supreme Audit institutions can fulfil their obligation in an objective and efficient manner only if they are fully independent from the auditee, protected from other external influences and have been provided with all the necessary financial assets for carrying out the tasks.

The principles set in the Lima declaration have been consolidated in the resolution ‘The facilitation of efficiency, responsibility and the transparency in the public sector', passed by the General Assembly of the United Nations on 22 December 2011, with the aim of strengthening the supreme audit institutions.

In June 2015 a meeting of the European Union Supreme Audit Institution' cooperation platform, the Contact Committee, took place within the framework of the Latvian Presidency of the Council of the European Union.

== History of the SAO ==
=== Origins (1918–1923) ===
After declaring the independence of the new Latvian state on 18 November 1918, there was an inevitable need for an institution that could supervise the functioning process of the state. Along with the creation of the executive authority – the People's Council of Latvia – on 2 December 1918, the State Audit Office of Latvia was founded. Simultaneously with the appointment of the new ministers, the prime minister of the Provisional Government Karlis Ulmanis appointed Eduard von Rosenberg – a German nobleman and lawyer, a representative German progressive bloc, as the Auditor General.

Before the proclamation of the independent state, the territory of Latvia was under control by the Tsarist Russian State authorities, which had their own version of audit control institution. The archives with other valuable documents of this authority were taken to Russia in 1915. The majority of the former employees had sought refuge, leaving a lack of professionals for the new national control institution.

During the period of Bolshevik (Pēteris Stučka government) and German occupation (Andrievs Niedra government), the State Audit Office as an independent institution existed only formally. The work on the creation of the Law on the State Audit Office was temporarily interrupted in January 1919, due to the Bolshevik invasion of Riga. The General Auditor Eduard von Rosenberg went abroad while the employees dispersed.

After the take-over of the largest part of the territory of Latvia by the Bolsheviks in the first half of 1919 the Soviet government created a Soviet-type control institution – the National Audit and Control commissariat – which lasted until mid-1920. The National Commissariat consisted of 11 head commissioners with and few department heads without voting rights. The alias of the State Controller in this ‘puppet government’ might be considered the National Audit Commissioner Augusts Sukuts.

However, after 16 April 1919, the coup by the loyalists of the Reich the first government of Andrejs Niedra was founded, which appointed Fricis Alberts Arājs as the Auditor General. Already in the same year on 17 June, he was replaced by Heinrich von Brimers. After the defeat of Landeswehr and Iron division which subordinated to the Niedra government in the Cēsis battle, on 8 July 1919 K.Ulmanis with the Latvian Temporary Government returned from Liepāja to Rīga. On 13 July, the Prime Minister set up his second cabinet and appointed Paul Mintz as the Auditor General.

=== Following the adoption of the Law of the State Audit Office (1923–1940) ===
The new State Audit law came into force on 16 August 1923. The Law on the State Audit Office stated that the board members were appointed by the Cabinet of Ministers, but confirmed by the Saeima. According to the law on the State Audit Office a special meeting of the State Audit Council with judicial functions was organized. In 1924 with a pro-active participation of the State Audit Office the "State Budget Law", was prepared and adopted which laid the foundation and accustomed the state employees to the official budgeting practice.

On 13 November 1923, Robert Ivanov was elected as the Auditor General Controller. He remained in his position until the coup d'état of 15 May 1934, when he decided to resign on his free will. After the coup, the State Audit Office was included in the executive structure and the Auditor was appointed by the Cabinet. Even during the authoritarian period, the first article of the Law on the State Audit Office which states that the State Audit Office is an independent, collegiate body, remained in force.

Eventually, Kārlis Ulmanis, appointed the former Head of Department Jānis Kaminskis as the Auditor General, remaining in this post until he was appointed Minister of Finance on 25 October 1939. The position of Auditor General was then given to Kārlis Piegāze, the Head of the First Department, in which he remained until the Soviet occupation.

=== During the occupation period (1940–1991) ===
During World War II the archives of the State Audit Office and the National Bureau of Statistics were lost due to warfare; they had been housed in the premises of the National Archives of the Republic of Latvia located in the Rundāle manor. During the period from 1940 to 1991, The State Audit Office as such was non-existent, however, the institutions for the management of the state’s public finances with different titles, tasks and objectives were set up and existed until 1991.

=== After regaining independence (1991) ===
At the end of 1991 the Supreme Council of the Republic of Latvia adopted the law "On the State Audit Office", however, the State Audit Office as an institution was established and became operational only in August 1992. On 28 October 1993 the Parliament passed a law re-establishing the law of 1923 "On the State Audit Office".

As a result of further development of the audit work in 1996 the State Audit Office created the Privatization Process Audit Department, and at the beginning of 1997 the Local Municipality Audit Department was established.

On 9 May 2002, the Parliament adopted the new "Law of the State Audit Office of the Republic of Latvia" which significantly strengthened the positions of the institution and extended the duties of the Audit Office thus including the task of auditing the use of the funding granted by the European Union, and improving the quality of auditing practice.

A reorganization of the structure of the State Audit Office in 2005 created a structure of six audit departments. Among five of these departments the audit areas were divided by sector, while the sixth department – the Audit, Methodology, Analysis and Development Department – became responsible for ensuring the development of audit methodology, strategic development and international co-operation, as well as the training of auditors and the control of audit quality.

==== Auditors-General since 1992 ====
The Auditor-General (head of the State Audit Office) is appointed for a renewable four-year term by the Saeima or Parliament.

1992–93	Austris Kalnins
1993–2004	Raits Černajs
2004–13	Inguna Sudraba
2013–21	Elita Krūmiņa
2021–23	Rolands Irklis
2023–	Edgars Korčagins
