= Nītaure =

Village in Latvia

- Village
- Nītaure's location in Latvia
- Coordinates: 57°4′13″N 25°11′32″E
- Country: Latvia
- Municipality: Cēsis
- Parish: Nītaure

Population (2021)
  - Total: 434

Nītaure is a village in Nītaure Parish, Cēsis Municipality in the Vidzeme region of Latvia. Nītaure had 434 residents as of 2021.

Olympic sports shooter Haralds Marvē and Latvian-American writer Agate Nesaule were born in Nītaure.

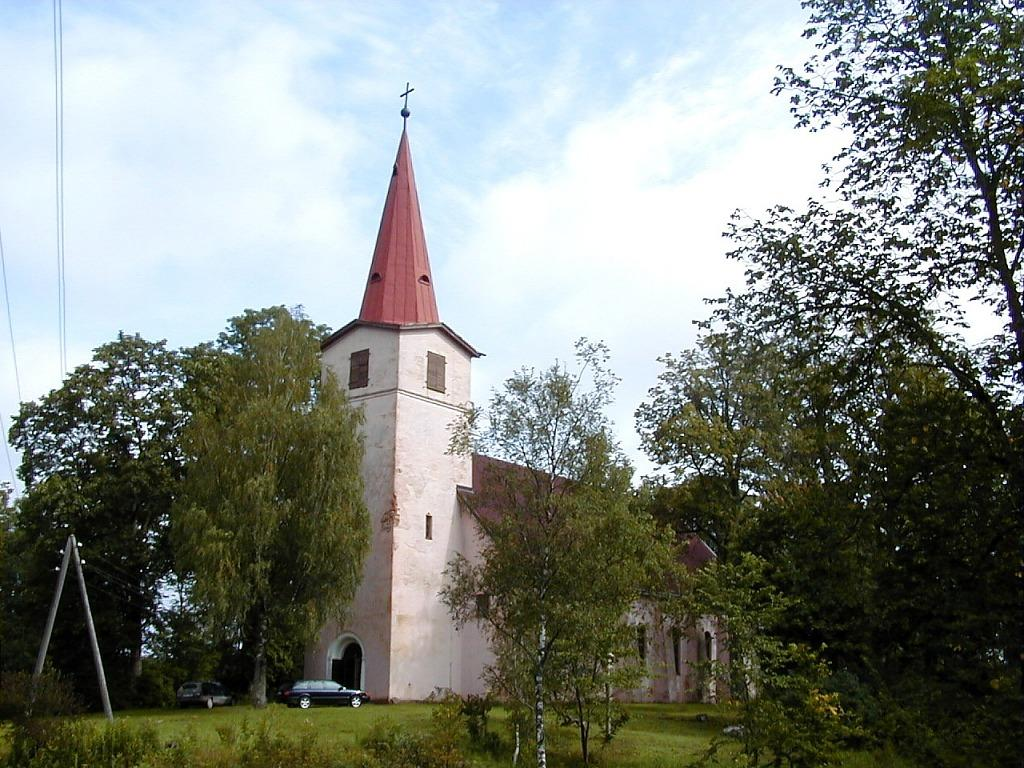
Nītaure Lutheran church
