= Lilita Zatlere =

Latvian businesswoman

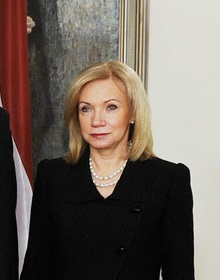
- Zatlere in 2011

First Lady of Latvia
- In office 8 July 2007 – 8 July 2011
- President: Valdis Zatlers
- Preceded by: Imants Freibergs
- Succeeded by: Dace Seisuma

Personal details
- Born: 24 February 1953 (age 72) Riga, Latvian SSR, Soviet Union
- Spouse: Valdis Zatlers
- Children: 3

Lilita Zatlere (born 24 February 1953 Riga) is a Latvian businesswoman. She served as the First Lady of Latvia from 2007 to 2011 during the presidency of her husband, Valdis Zatlers.

== Biography ==
Zatlere was born in Riga on 24 February 1953. She attended elementary school in Rīga No. 15 Eight-Year School. She then studied at Rīga Trade Technical School and the Soviet-era People's University. After completing school, Zatlere began working with art at an antiques shop.

Following the restoration of Latvian independence, Lilita Zatlere was appointed to a Riga city commission which focused on compensating Latvians who had lost property during the Soviet occupation. She served on the committee for three years. From 1995 to 2007, she was the director of the Private Orthopaedic Practice, which supplied spinal implants to the Hospital of Traumatology and Orthopedics, which was headed by her second husband, Valdis Zatlers.

== Honors and awards ==
- Estonia: First Class of the Order of the Cross of Terra Mariana, First Class (April 2009)
- Finland: Grand Cross of the Order of the White Rose of Finland (May 2010)
- Lithuania: Grand Cross of the Order of Vytautas the Great (2011)
- Romania: Grand Cross of the National Order of Faithful Service (2011)
- Sovereign Military Order of Malta: Grand Cross of the Order pro Merito Melitensi (October 2008)
- Spain: Dame Grand Cross of the Order of Isabella the Catholic
- Ukraine: First Class of the Order of Princess Olga (June 2008)
