= Dissolution of parliament in Latvia =

Concept of politics of Latvia

The Constitution of Latvia, ratified on February 15, 1922, contains a provision regarding one of the reserve powers of the President of Latvia to initiate the dissolution of the parliament. According to Article 48-50 of the Constitution,

48. The President shall be entitled to propose the dissolution of the Saeima. Following this proposal, a national referendum shall be held. If in the referendum more than half of the votes are cast in favour of dissolution, the Saeima shall be considered dissolved, new elections called, and such elections held no later than two months after the date of the dissolution of the Saeima.
49. If the Saeima has been dissolved, the mandate of the members of the Saeima shall continue in effect until the newly elected Saeima has convened, but the dissolved Saeima may only hold sittings at the request of the President. The agenda of such sittings shall be determined by the President.
50. If in the referendum more than half of the votes are cast against the dissolution of the Saeima, then the President shall be deemed to be removed from office, and the Saeima shall elect a new President to serve for the remaining term of office of the President so removed.

Since 2009, Article 14 also foresees the right for the citizens without involvement of president:

14. Not less than one tenth of electors has the right to initiate a national referendum regarding recalling of the Saeima. If the majority of voters and at least two thirds of the number of the voters who participated in the last elections of the Saeima vote in the national referendum regarding recalling of the Saeima, then the Saeima shall be deemed recalled. The right to initiate a national referendum regarding recalling of the Saeima may not be exercised one year after the convening of the Saeima and one year before the end of the term of office of the Saeima, during the last six months of the term of office of the President, as well as earlier than six months after the previous national referendum regarding recalling of the Saeima.
The electors may not recall any individual member of the Saeima.

Thus, the Constitution establishes one of the possible procedures to resolve a political crisis in a parliamentary republic by entitling the President, an otherwise largely ceremonial figure, to initiate the dissolution of parliament, but at the potential cost of his own office, should his initiative be rejected by popular vote.

This constitutional power was used for the first time in the history of the Latvian state by the President, Valdis Zatlers, on May 28, 2011. This move was in response to the parliament's refusal to sanction a search at the home of Ainārs Šlesers, a Saeima member and former Cabinet minister. The referendum on the dissolution of parliament has to take place no later than two months time after the President's decree. On May 30 the Central Election Commission resolved that the vote take place on July 23, 2011.

Previously, following the riots in Riga on January 13, 2009, President Zatlers promised to dissolve the Saeima unless it adopted amendments to the Constitution providing for the possibility of dissolving it by popular vote. These amendments were adopted by the Saeima on April 8, 2009, but on April 1, 2009, the President decided not to dissolve parliament.

The Latvian parliament, the Saeima, was also dissolved unconstitutionally on May 15, 1934 following a bloodless coup organized by then-Prime Minister Kārlis Ulmanis. The Cabinet declared a military state of emergency and suspended the activity of all parties which effectively put a ban on the work of the Saeima. This act was in direct violation of the Constitution and led to the establishment of an authoritarian regime.

== See also ==
- 2011 Latvian parliamentary dissolution referendum
- Politics of Latvia
