= Ringolds Balodis =

Latvian politician (born 1966)

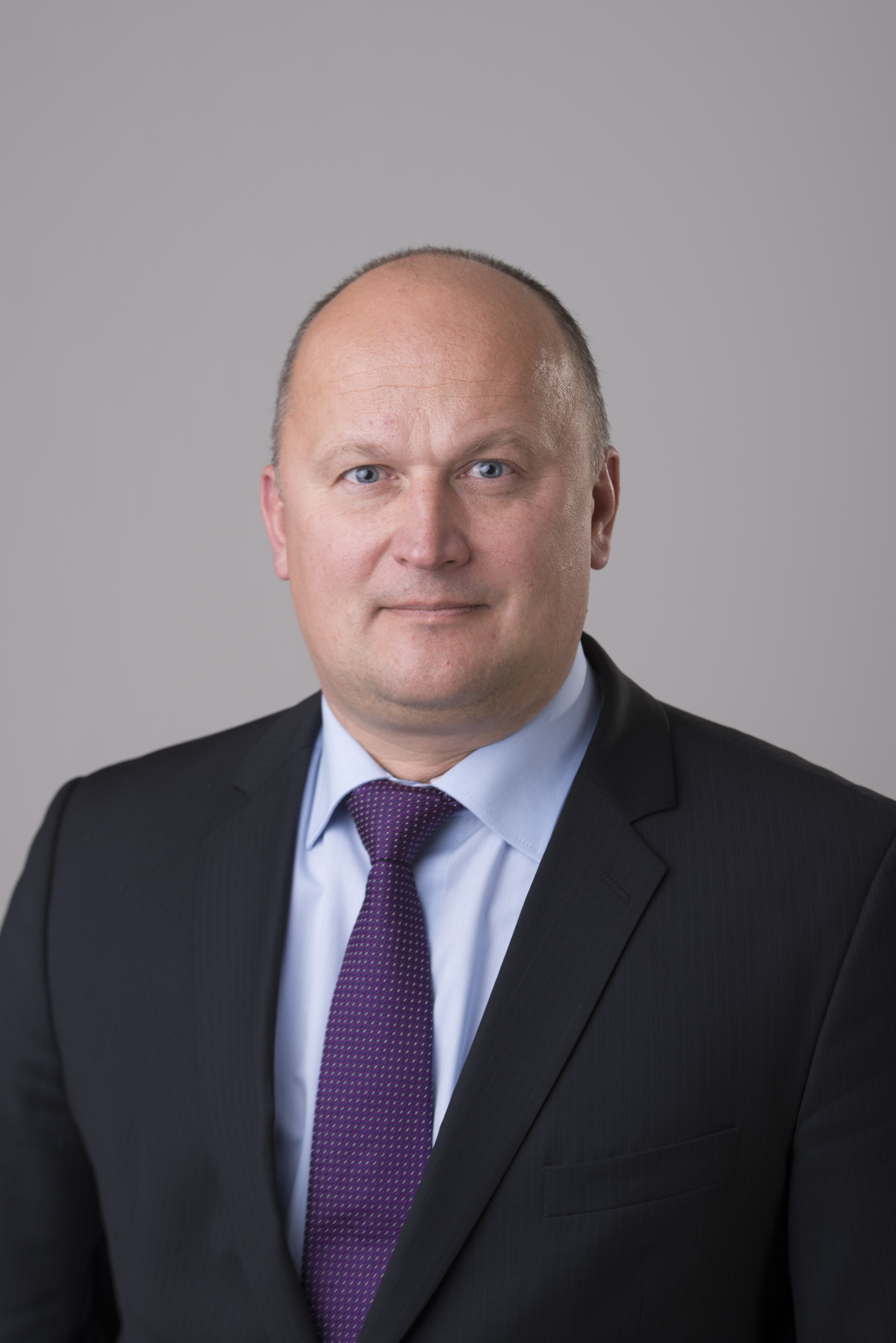

Ringolds Balodis (born 1966) is a Latvian politician and member of the twelfth Saeima.
