= 2007 Latvian presidential election =

- May 31, 2007
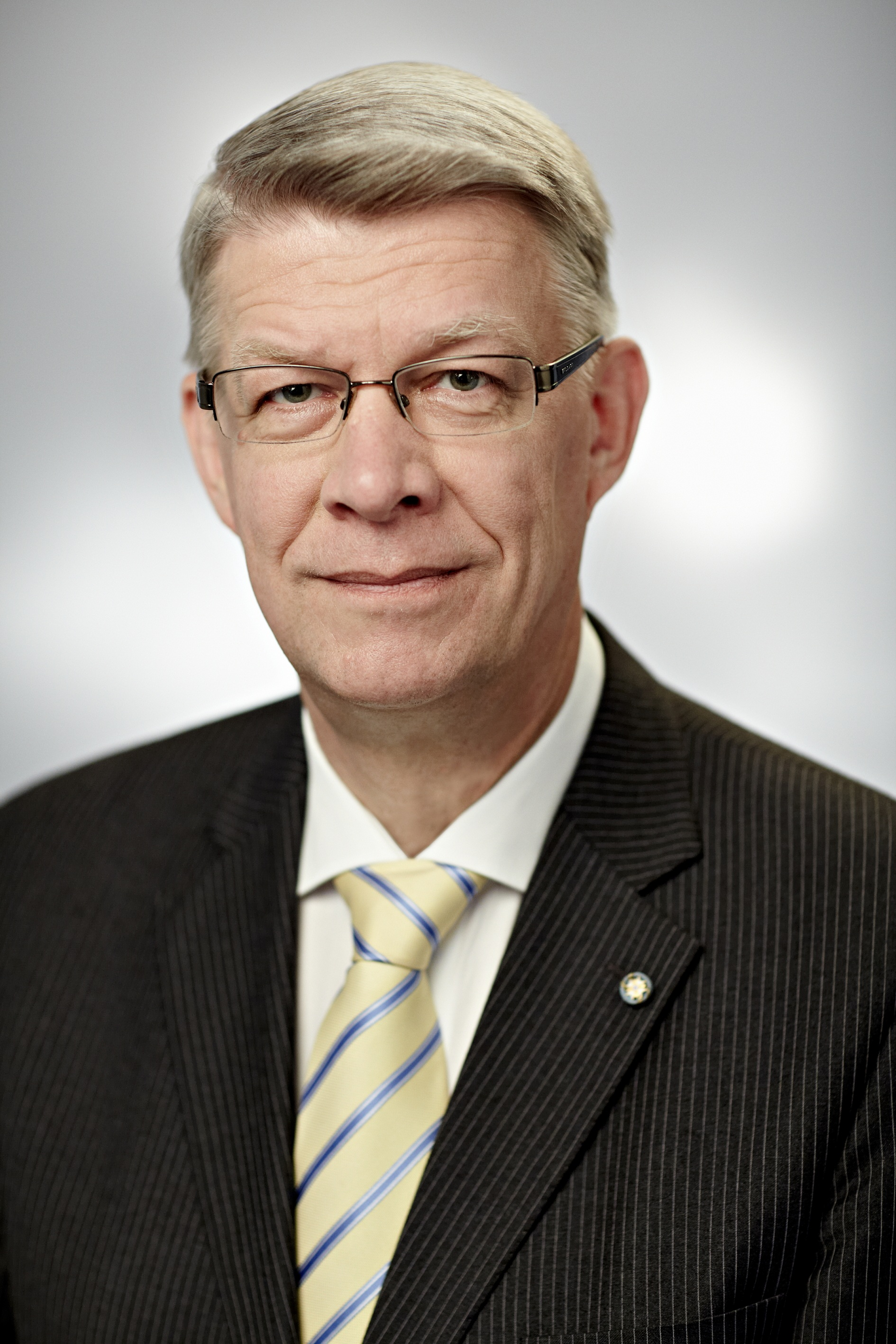

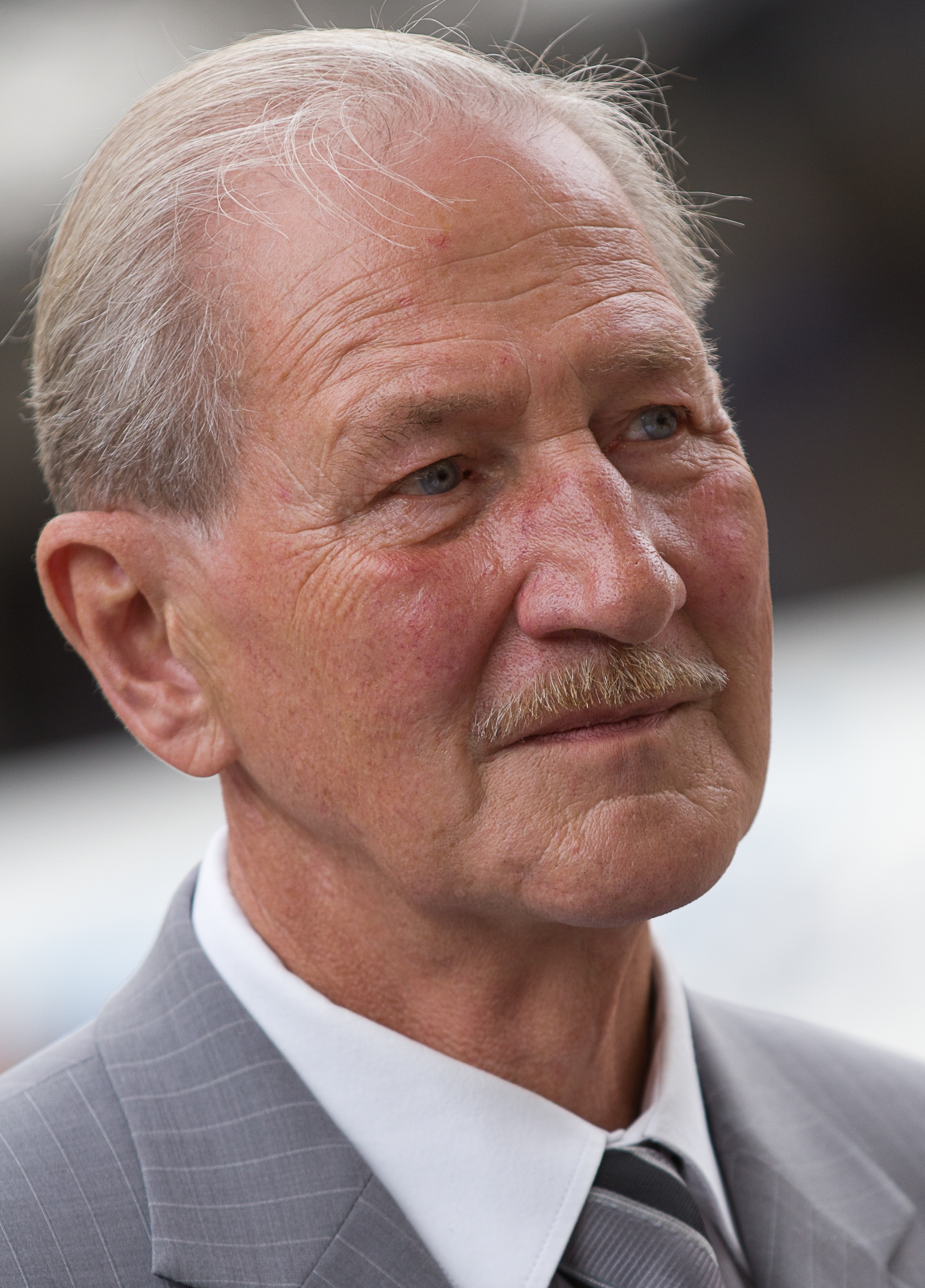
Candidate	Valdis Zatlers	Aivars Endziņš
Electoral vote	58	39
President of Latvia before election
Vaira Vīķe-Freiberga
Elected President of Latvia
Valdis Zatlers

A presidential election was held in the Latvian Saeima on 31 May 2007. The government candidate Valdis Zatlers defeated Aivars Endziņš.

== Nominations ==
Candidate	Nominated by	Date of entry	Notes
Sandra Kalniete	New Era Party	5 September 2006	Withdrew on 24 May 2007 in favour of Endziņš.
Māris Riekstiņš	People's Party	27 April 2007	Withdrew in favour of Zatlers
Karina Pētersone	LPP/LC	12 May 2007	Withdrew in favour of Zatlers
Valdis Zatlers	governing coalition (TP, ZZS, LPP/LC, TB/LNNK)	22 May 2007	Won election
Aivars Endziņš	Harmony Centre	24 May 2007	Lost election

Before the governing coalition had agreed on Zatlers as a candidate, the People's Party had proposed Māris Riekstiņš and LPP/LC had proposed Karina Pētersone. They subsequently withdrew their candidacies. Similarly, the New Era Party had proposed Sandra Kalniete, who withdrew her candidacy after Harmony Centre nominated Endziņš. For Human Rights in United Latvia did not nominate a candidate, it was announced after election that they supported Endziņš.

== Public reaction ==
Although the powers of the President of Latvia are limited and the office is rather symbolic, 6th president Vaira Vīķe-Freiberga, who held office from 1999 to 2007, managed to gain political authority and high popular approval. By Latvian law one cannot be president for more than eight years, therefore, the previous president could not be re-elected and the election drew significant public attention.

Notably, the New Era Party announced that its candidate would be Sandra Kalniete, before the Saeima election held in 2006, and used the slogan "Kalniete for president!" in its parliamentary election campaign. As election day drew nearer, a political battle between the two remaining candidates ensued. Zatlers, who is a doctor, was accused of taking money from his patients, which he admitted. This is connected with a set of problems in Latvia's domestic politics: people employed in health care are considered underpaid; patients often give doctors gifts of gratitude, sometimes in the form of money, and some doctors are accused of extortion. Notably, former Health minister Āris Auders had to leave office when one of his patients accused him of fraud. Zatlers was also criticized for lack of experience. Endziņš in turn was criticized for having been a member of the Communist Party of the Soviet Union before the independence of Latvia was re-established: this caused even more passionate debate when it was discovered that Endziņš had denied the occupation of Latvia in the 1970s.

Endziņš was the most popular candidate among the general public. An opinion poll showed that Endziņš was supported by 54% of Latvians and Zatlers was supported by 29%.

People at the Latvian House of Parliament shouted - "Envelopes! Envelopes!" and "Thief! Thief!", when Zatlers came out after elections.

== Process and Results ==
Endziņš' supporters hoped that the public support for his candidacy would sway some of members of the parliament from the ruling coalition to vote for Endziņš. This did not come true. Although one of coalition's MPs, Anna Seile voted for Endziņš and another, Karīna Pētersone, voted against both candidates, this was cancelled out by at least 3 opposition MPs voting for Zatlers, disobeying the decision by their party leaders to support Endziņš. There may be situation that at least 6 coalition MPs voted for Endziņš and more opposition MPs from Harmony Centre voted for Zatlers. Valdis Zatlers was elected president.

Candidate	For	Against
Valdis Zatlers	58	40
Aivars Endziņš	39	59
