= Raimonds Vējonis =

President of Latvia from 2015 to 2019

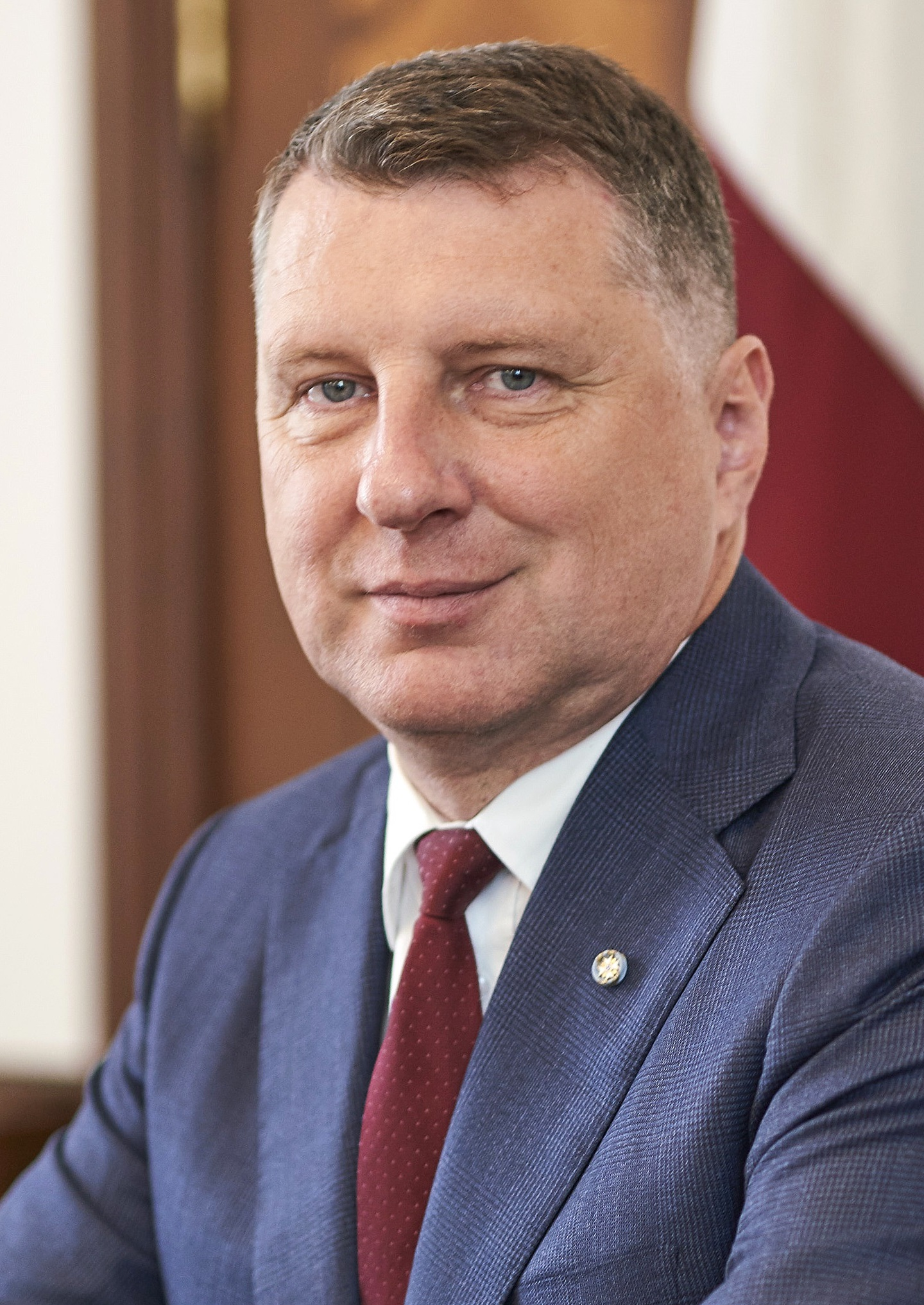
- Vējonis in 2019

9th President of Latvia
- In office 8 July 2015 – 8 July 2019
- Prime Minister: Laimdota Straujuma; Māris Kučinskis; Krišjānis Kariņš
- Preceded by: Andris Bērziņš
- Succeeded by: Egils Levits

Minister of Defence
- In office 22 January 2014 – 7 July 2015
- Prime Minister: Valdis Dombrovskis; Laimdota Straujuma
- Preceded by: Artis Pabriks
- Succeeded by: Raimonds Bergmanis

Minister of Environmental Protection and Regional Development
- In office 7 November 2002 – 25 October 2011
- Prime Minister: Einars Repše; Indulis Emsis; Aigars Kalvītis; Ivars Godmanis; Valdis Dombrovskis
- Preceded by: Vladimirs Makarovs
- Succeeded by: Edmunds Sprūdžs

President of the Latvian Basketball Association
- Incumbent
- Assumed office 21 January 2020
- Preceded by: Valdis Voins

Personal details
- Born: 15 June 1966 (age 60) Nikonovo, Russian SFSR, Soviet Union
- Party: Green Party
- Spouse: Iveta Vējone (m. 1986)
- Children: 2
- Education: University of Latvia

Raimonds Vējonis ([ˈrajmɔnts ˈvæːjuɔnis]; born 15 June 1966) is a Latvian politician who served as the 9th President of Latvia from 2015 to 2019 and the president of the Latvian Basketball Association since 2020.

He is a member of the Latvian Green Party, part of the United List. He served as Minister of Environmental Protection and Regional Development in 2002 and in 2011 and as Minister of the Environment from 2003 to 2011, while the Ministry of Regional Development was a separate department. He became Minister of Defence of Latvia in 2014 and held that office until becoming president in 2015. Since 2020 he is the president of Latvian Basketball Association.

== Early life and career ==
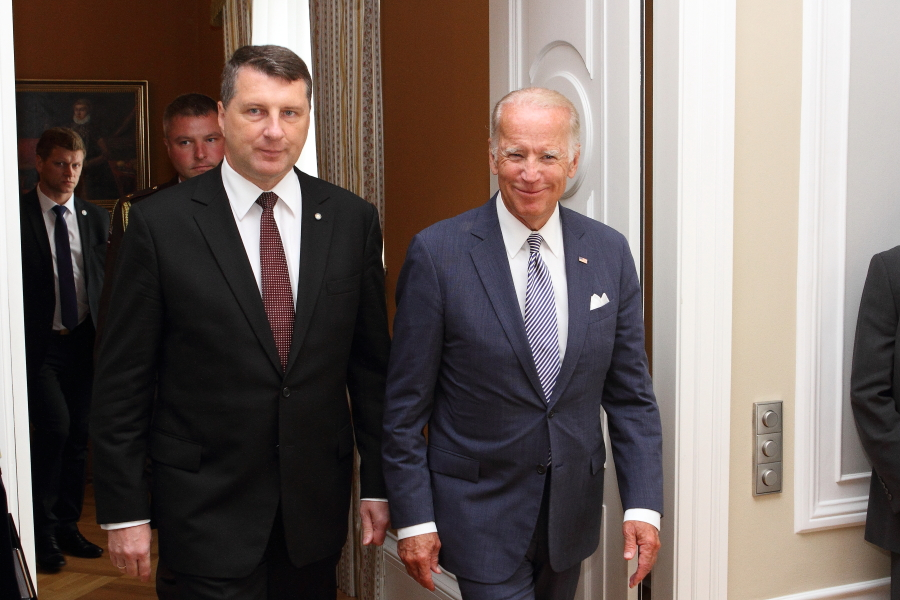
Vējonis with U.S. Vice President Joe Biden in Washington, D.C., on 23 August 2016

Vējonis was born on 15 June 1966 in Pskov Oblast to a Latvian father and a Russian mother, while his father was serving in the Soviet army there. He grew up in Sarkaņi and attended school in the nearby town of Madona. Vējonis became interested in environmental protection because his grandfather had been blinded by chemicals used on a Soviet kolkhoz.

He graduated from Faculty of Biology of the University of Latvia in 1989 and obtained a master's degree from it in 1995. During his studies he worked as a biology teacher in Madona. From 1989 to 1996 he was deputy director of Madona Regional Environmental board. He was a member of Madona city council from 1990 to 1993. From 1996 to 2002 he was director of Greater Riga Regional Environmental board, during this period he also was a board member in Skulte port and served as state representative at Getliņi Eko waste management company.

== Political career ==
In 2002, Vējonis became Minister of Environmental Protection and Regional Development.

He was elected as President of Latvia on 3 June 2015, receiving the votes of 55 of the 100 members of the Saeima. He used his victory speech to promise to ensure national security, in light of events in Ukraine, while protecting the environment. He became the first head of state in the European Union to be a member of a green party.

== Post-presidency ==
In January 2020, Vējonis was elected to a four-year term as president of the Latvian Basketball Association by a wide margin. He was elected in the 2026 elections to the 15th Saeima. He became a Deputy Speaker of the Saeima.

== Personal life ==
In 1986, he married Iveta Vējone, a teacher and former first lady. The couple have two sons, Ivo and Nauris. Vejonis speaks fluent Russian and decent English in addition to Latvian.

=== Health problems ===
On 18 January 2016, Vējonis was hospitalized. He was first transported to the Toxicology and Sepsis Clinic of the Riga East Clinical University Hospital branch Gaiļezers, but a day later was transferred to the Latvian Cardiology Center at Pauls Stradiņš Clinical University Hospital. The press counselor of the president initially did not disclose the nature of the illness and suggested that the president had a viral infection. However, independent medical experts theorized that Vējonis probably had an infective endocarditis. On 20 January Vējonis underwent emergency open heart surgery to eliminate the source of infection in which the heart valve damaged by sepsis was replaced with an artificial heart valve. Later on unnamed sources told the press that the illness was likely caused by untreated tonsillitis, the press counselor of the president, while still refusing to disclose exact diagnosis, confirmed that the president had been having issues with his throat and his voice had been very hoarse.

Vējonis left hospital on 26 February to undergo physical therapy at National Rehabilitation Center "Vaivari". He was reported to be doing some work during his illness, but fully resumed his official duties on 30 March after spending more than two months recovering.

== Honours ==
National Honours

- Latvia: (Former Grand Master) and Commander Grand Cross with Chain of the Order of the Three Stars (8 July 2015).
- Latvia: (Former Grand Master) and Grand Cross of the Order of Viesturs
- Latvia: Former Grand Master of the Cross of Recognition

Foreign Honours

- Estonia: Collar of the Order of the Cross of Terra Mariana (2 April 2019)
- Germany: Grand Cross special class of the Order of Merit of the Federal Republic of Germany (22 February 2019)
- Iceland: Grand cross with Collar of the Order of the Falcon (16 November 2018)
- Italy: Knight Grand Cross with Collar of the Order of Merit of the Italian Republic (26 June 2018)
- Netherlands: Knight Grand Cross of the Order of the Netherlands Lion (11 June 2018).
- Ukraine: The First Class of the Order of Prince Yaroslav the Wise (22 November 2018).

Political offices
Preceded by Vladimirs Makarovs	Minister of Environmental Protection and Regional Development; 2002–2011	Succeeded by Edmunds Sprūdžs
Preceded by Artis Pabriks	Minister of Defence; 2014–2015	Succeeded by Raimonds Bergmanis
Preceded by Andris Bērziņš	President of Latvia; 2015–2019	Succeeded by Egils Levits
Sporting positions
Preceded by Valdis Voins	President of the Latvian Basketball Association; 2020–present	Incumbent
