= Andris Bērziņš (president) =

Latvian businessman and politician

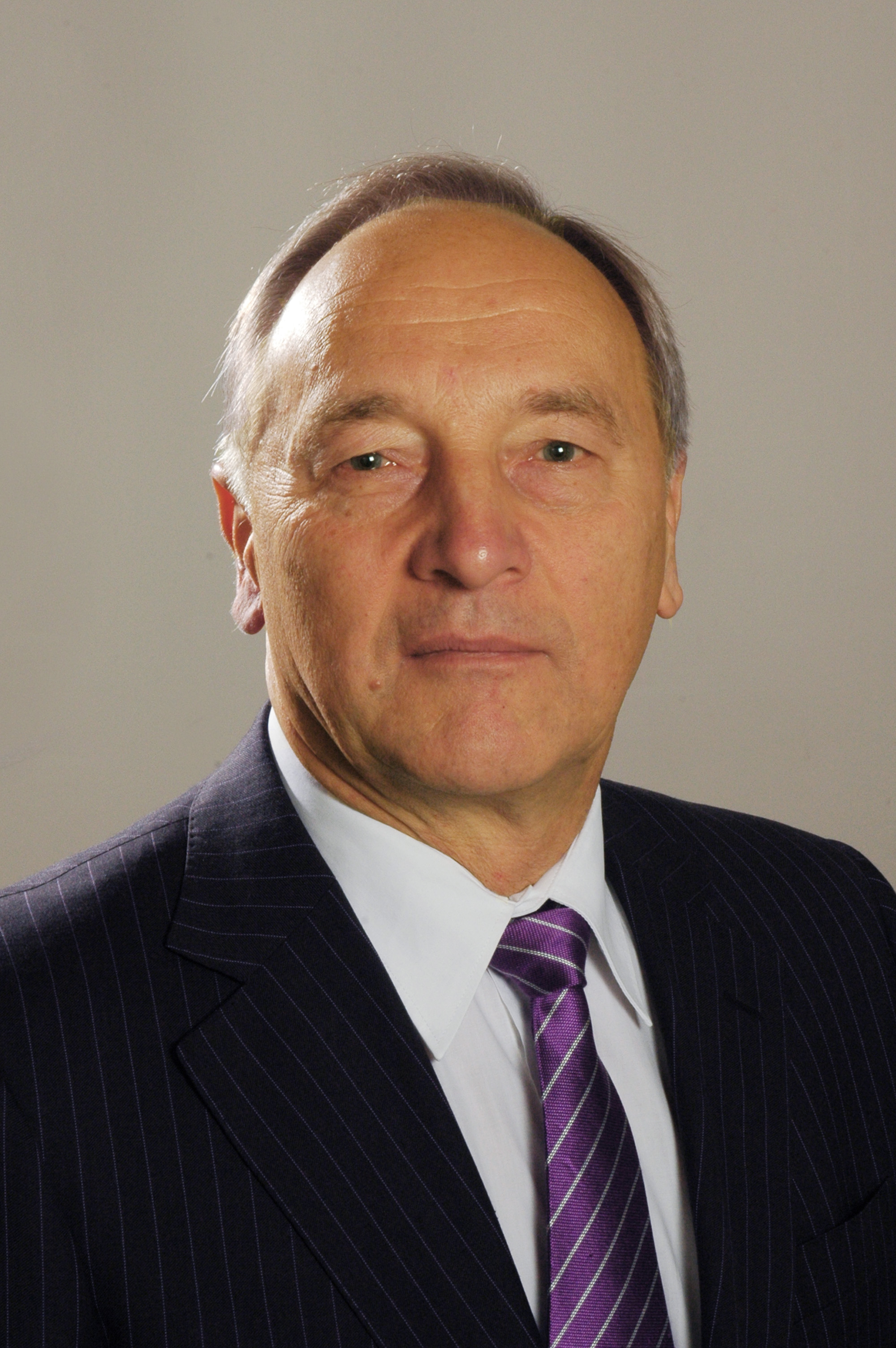
- Bērziņš in 2010

8th President of Latvia
- In office 8 July 2011 – 8 July 2015
- Prime Minister: Valdis Dombrovskis; Laimdota Straujuma
- Preceded by: Valdis Zatlers
- Succeeded by: Raimonds Vējonis

Personal details
- Born: 10 December 1944 (age 81) Nītaure, then part of Latvian SSR, Soviet Union
- Party: Communist Party (Before 1990); Popular Front (1990–1993); Union of Greens and Farmers (2002–2011); Independent (2011–present)
- Spouse(s): Dzintra Bērziņa (past) Dace Seisuma (m. 2011; div. 2016)
- Children: 5
- Education: Riga Technical University; University of Latvia

Andris Bērziņš (born 10 December 1944) is a Latvian businessman and politician who was President of Latvia from 2011 to 2015. Bērziņš was the President of Unibanka from 1993 to 2004. He was elected as President by the Saeima on 2 June 2011.

== Early career ==
Andris Bērziņš was born 10 December 1944 in Nītaure, Latvian SSR, Soviet Union. In 1958, he completed studies at a Nītaure primary school and attended the 1st secondary school of Sigulda from 1958 to 1962. He then began studying at the Riga Polytechnical Institute, which he graduated in 1971, and became a radio engineer at the "Elektrons" factory. He worked his way up to the director and in 1988 was appointed deputy minister of municipal services of the Latvian SSR. He also studied at the Economics Faculty of the Latvian State University, which he graduated in 1988.

In 1989 Bērziņš was elected to the Valmiera district Council (Soviet) of People's Deputies and was appointed chairman of the district's executive committee. In 1990 he was elected to the Supreme Council of the Latvian SSR, representing Valmiera. He joined the Latvian Popular Front faction in the Supreme Council. On 4 May 1990, he voted in favour of the declaration that restored the independence of the Republic of Latvia.

After the completion of his term as deputy in 1993, Bērziņš became chairman of the Privatization Fund of the Bank of Latvia. He also became president of Latvijas Unibanka (a joint-stock company; 1993–2004). Bērziņš became a successful businessman and his estate exceeded 1 000 000 lats (by the mid-2000s). He also owned 30 various land properties. Bērziņš worked as an advisor to the president of the SEB Bank Latvian branch and was a board member of several joint-stock companies, including Valmieras stikla šķiedra and Lode Brickworks.

== Political career ==
Andris Bērziņš returned to politics in 2005 when he unsuccessfully ran for the office of Mayor of Riga as the leader of the Union of Greens and Farmers party list. From 2006 to 2010 he served as the president of the Latvian Chamber of Industry and Commerce and was also Latvenergo's board chairman (until 2009).

In 2010 Andris Bērziņš was elected deputy of the Saeima from the slate of candidates presented by the Union of Greens and Farmers.

=== 2011 presidential election ===
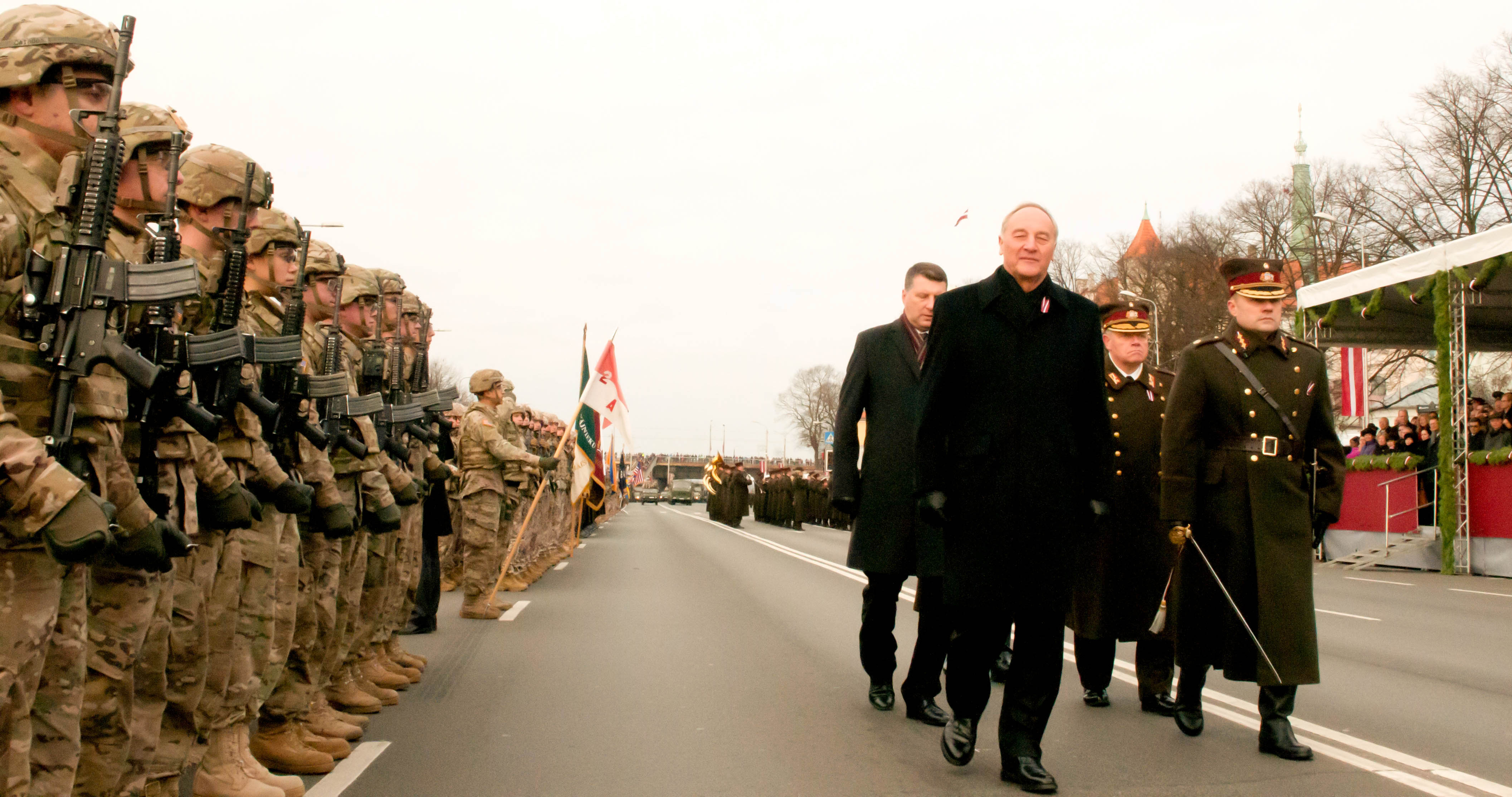
Bērziņš reviewing American and Polish soldiers during the 2014 Latvia Day Parade.

On 23 May 2011 Andris Bērzinš was nominated as a presidential candidate by five Union of Greens and Farmers deputies.

In the first round of the election (2 June 2011), Bērziņš received 50 votes for and 48 against, while Valdis Zatlers got 43 for and 55 against (99 lawmakers cast votes, but one was invalid), meaning no one was elected. In the second round, held later on the same day, Bērziņš received 53 votes, winning the election. Andris Bērziņš took office as President of Latvia on 8 July 2011.

=== 2015 presidential election ===
On 10 April 2015 he announced he would not be seeking the Presidency for a second term.

On 3 June 2015 Raimonds Vējonis was elected as Bērziņš' successor and took office on 8 July 2015.

=== 2017 Riga local election ===
Bērziņš announced that he will stand for a councillor seat in the June 2017 election.

== Personal life ==
Andris Bērziņš married Dace Seisuma a couple of days before assuming office as president. It is his second marriage. He has 5 children. His uncle was a casualty of the Soviet deportations from Latvia, dying in what is now Tajikistan in 1943. Aside from his native Latvian, he also speaks Russian and English fluently and German on a relatively good level. When questioned on his use of Russian instead of Latvian at certain events, he said that "The question of language is often politicized, because it is a very cheap way to conduct an election campaign". He has also encouraged Latvians to start to learn Russian alongside English.

On 3 September 2012, Bērziņš threatened TV news crew which was filming him coming alongside his son on the first day of the school year: "Guys, you want me to beat you over the head? It's been a long time since you've been beaten?..."

== Honours ==
=== National ===
- Commander Grand Cross (1st Class) with Chain of the Order of the Three Stars (2011)
- Commander of Order of the Three Stars (2000)
- Grand Cross (1st Class) of the Order of Viesturs (2011)
- 1st Class of the Cross of Recognition (2011)
- Commemorative pin for participants in the 1991 barricades (1996)

=== Foreign ===
- Norway: Grand Cross of the Order of St. Olav (2015)
- Croatia: Grand Cross of the Grand Order of King Tomislav (2012)

Political offices
Preceded by Valdis Zatlers	President of Latvia; 2011–2015	Succeeded by Raimonds Vējonis
