= Valdis Zatlers =

Latvian politician and former physician (born 1955)

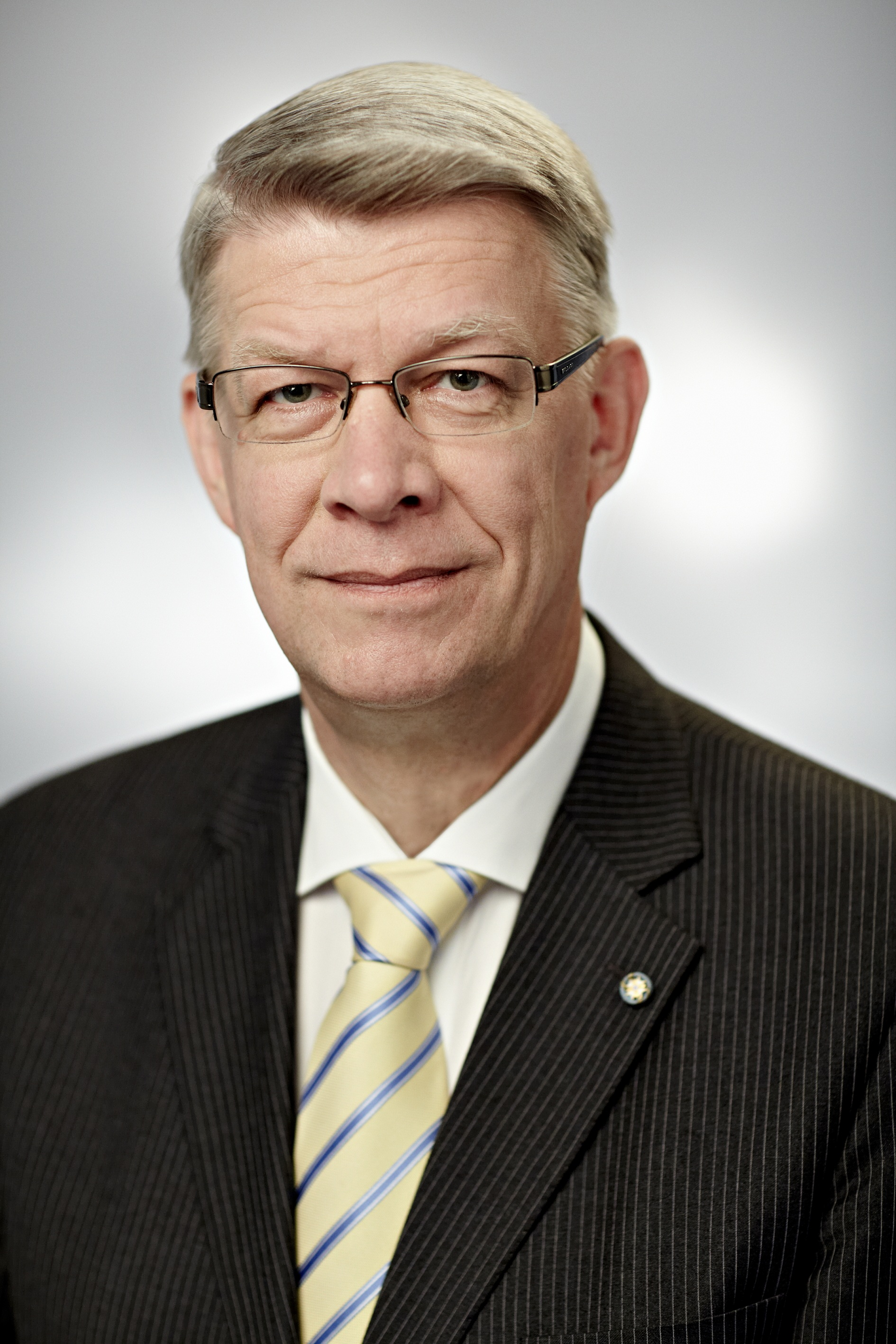
- Zatlers in 2011

7th President of Latvia
- In office 8 July 2007 – 8 July 2011
- Prime Minister: Aigars Kalvītis; Ivars Godmanis; Valdis Dombrovskis
- Preceded by: Vaira Vīķe-Freiberga
- Succeeded by: Andris Bērziņš

Personal details
- Born: 22 March 1955 (age 71) Riga, then part of Latvian SSR, Soviet Union
- Party: Independent (before 2011); Reform Party (2011–2015)
- Spouse: Lilita Zatlere
- Children: Gustavs; Felicita; Kārlis
- Education: Riga Stradiņš University

Valdis Zatlers(/ˈvældɪs ˈzætlərz/; born 22 March 1955) is a Latvian politician and former physician who served as the seventh president of Latvia from 2007 to 2011. He won the Latvian presidential election of 31 May 2007. He became President of Latvia on 8 July 2007 and left office on 7 July 2011 after failing to win reelection for a second term.

== Early life and medical career ==
Valdis Zatlers was born on 22 March 1955, in Riga, Latvian SSR (now Latvia). He graduated from the Riga Stradiņš University in 1979. After his studies he worked in Riga Hospital No. 2 and became chief of its traumatology unit in 1985. In 1986, between May and June, he was dispatched to Ukraine as a medical service officer (senior lieutenant) of the Soviet Army to support the cleanup operations following the Chernobyl disaster.

He was the director of the Latvian Traumatology and Orthopaedics Hospital from 1994 and chief of its board from 1998. He left these offices on 5 July 2007. On 27 April 2007, he received the Order of the Three Stars (Trīs Zvaigžņu Ordenis) of the 4th rank for his contributions in care for health of the patients and promotion of orthopedics in Latvia.

== Political career ==
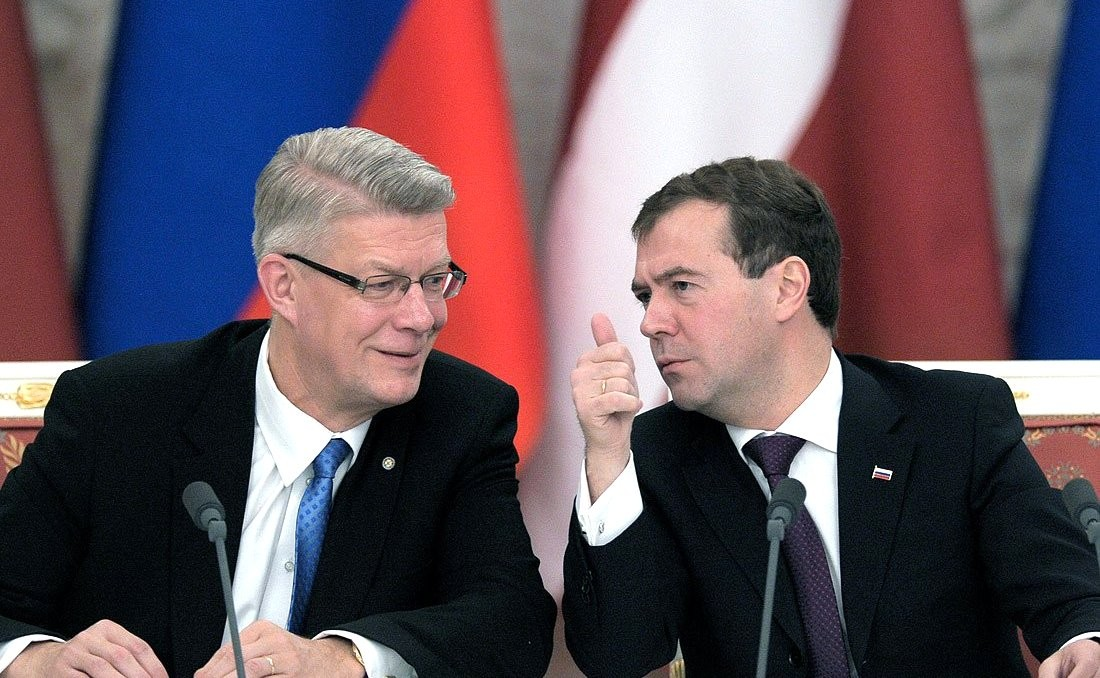
Zatlers with Dmitry Medvedev.

Valdis Zatlers was a board member of the Popular Front of Latvia in 1988–1989. On 22 May 2007, the ruling parliamentary coalition of the Latvian Saeima officially nominated Zatlers as its presidential candidate. Zatlers himself was not a member of any political party, but had signed the manifesto of the People's Party when the party was founded in 1998. During his tenure, he emphasized issues like economic reforms, public health, and increased government transparency.

On 2 June 2011 an MP from the Greens and Farmers' Union, Andris Bērziņš, defeated the incumbent, Valdis Zatlers, in presidential elections despite Zatlers having previously been expected to win the vote. He founded the Reform Party in July 2011.

=== Presidency ===
In his TV speech, on 28 May 2011, President Zatlers called for radical reforms to curb the corrupting influence of oligarchs. He accused lawmakers of being soft on corruption and announced that he would use his constitutional powers to initiate a referendum on the dissolution of the current Saeima. The formal cause of this decision was the parliament's refusal to sanction a search at the home of Ainārs Šlesers, a Saeima member and former minister. Zatlers was the first President of Latvia to use these reserve presidential powers. In the referendum, 94% of the voters had supported Zatlers' decision, and Under the relevant sections of the Constitution of Latvia the Saeima was dismissed and new parliament elections organized.

==== Relations with Russia ====
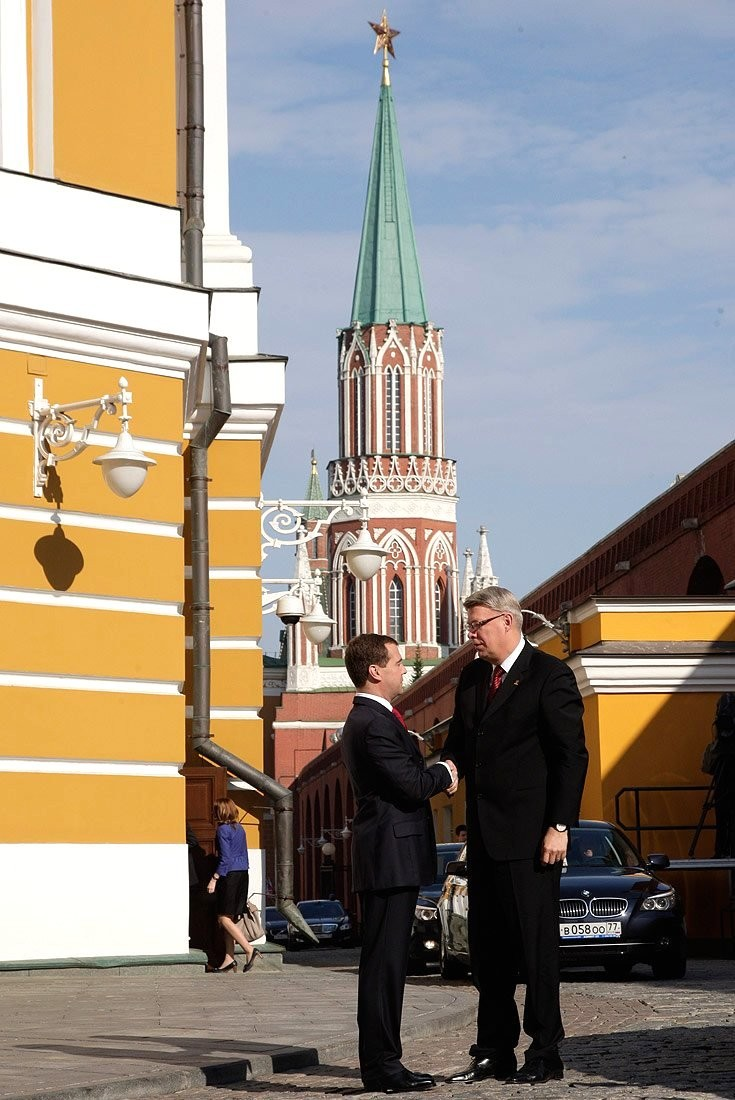
Zatlers meeting with Medvedev in the Moscow Kremlin.

He attended the 2010 Moscow Victory Day Parade on Red Square on 9 May, making good on his acceptance of his invitation to attend the 65th VE Day celebrations in Russia that he received in February. In December 2010, Zatlers made his first official state visit to Moscow. The four-day official visit included talks with Russian President Dmitry Medvedev, as well as Prime Minister Vladimir Putin, Mayor Yuri Luzhkov and the Patriarch Kirill of the Russian Orthodox Church. While speaking at the Latvia-Russia Business Forum in St. Petersburg on 20 December, he spoke in favor of the introduction of a visa free regime between the EU and Russia. On the final day of the forum, he laid flowers at the Piskaryov Memorial Cemetery.

=== Post-presidency activities ===
On July 9, 2011, the day after the new president took office, Zatlers held a press conference to announce the creation of a new political party, the Zatlers' Reform Party. On July 23, the party's founding congress was held.

In the 2011 Latvian parliamentary election, Zatlers was elected as a member of the Saeima. He was not elected as the Speaker of the Saeima in a secret ballot, although the coalition had agreed to support the candidate. In July 2013, Zatlers resigned from the position of Chairman of the Reform Party Board, and in October also from the position of Chairman of the City Council.

== Controversy ==
Before his election he confessed that, as a doctor, he had accepted private donations from his patients. Transparency International has questioned the legality of this practice. Zatlers' supporters point out that donations of this form are accepted by many Latvian doctors. The Corruption Prevention and Combating Bureau (KNAB) characterized Zatlers' behaviour as improper and has said that it would not finalize its investigation of the matter for several months. In July 2008, KNAB ruled that Zatlers had not violated the law by accepting these donations.

Politicians criticized Zatlers for not paying taxes on these gifts. The State Revenue Service, which had previously requested him to pay taxes on the gifts, unable to fine him for tax evasion, fined Zatlers 250 Lats for missing data in officials declaration.

In 2003, Zatlers was the subject of an investigation by KNAB, Latvia's anti-corruption office. The investigation was started based on a request by Āris Auders, a former subordinate of Zatlers who had become the Minister of Healthcare. Auders had accused Zatlers of buying low-quality spinal implants from companies run by Zatlers' wife and the deputy director of Zatlers' hospital. The investigation cleared Zatlers of all charges.

== Personal life ==
Valdis Zatlers is married to Lilita Zatlere and has three children. In addition to his native Latvian, he is fluent in English and Russian.

== Honours and awards ==
=== National ===
- Commander Grand Cross (1st Class) with Chain of the Order of the Three Stars (2008)
- Grand Cross (1st Class) of the Order of Viesturs (2008)

=== Foreign ===
- Azerbaijan: Recipient of the Heydar Aliyev Order (10 August 2009)
- Croatia: Grand Cross of the Grand Order of King Tomislav (2 September 2008)
- Estonia: Collar of the Order of the Cross of Terra Mariana (2 April 2009)
- Finland: Grand Cross with Collar of the Order of the White Rose (2010)
- Georgia: Recipient of the St. George's Order of Victory (9 December 2009)
- Kazakhstan: Recipient of the Order of Friendship (2008)
- Lithuania: Grand Cross with Golden Chain of the Order of Vytautas the Great (7 February 2011)
- Romania: Collar of the Order of the Star of Romania (2011)
- Spain: Collar of the Order of Isabella the Catholic (30 April 2009)
- Ukraine:
  - Member of the Order of Liberty (26 April 2011)
  - First Class of the Order of Prince Yaroslav the Wise (25 June 2008)

=== Honorary doctorates ===
- (Armenia) Yerevan State University: Honorary doctorate (2009)
- Poland John Paul II Catholic University of Lublin:
- Latvia Riga Stradiņš University: Honorary doctorate (2010)

Political offices
Preceded by Vaira Vīķe-Freiberga	President of Latvia; 2007–2011	Succeeded by Andris Bērziņš
