= Second Kalvītis cabinet =

The second Kalvītis cabinet was the government of Latvia from 7 November 2006 to 20 December 2007. It was the second government to be led by Aigars Kalvītis, who had previously been prime minister since 2004. It took office on 7 November 2006, after the October 2006 election, succeeding the first Kalvītis cabinet, which had lasted from 2004 to 2006. It was replaced by the second Godmanis cabinet on 20 December 2007, after the resignation of Kalvītis.

Position	Name	Party	Dates
Prime Minister	Aigars Kalvītis	People's Party	7 November 2006 – 20 December 2007
Minister for Defence	Atis Slakteris	People's Party	7 November 2006 – 20 December 2007
Minister for Foreign Affairs	Artis Pabriks	People's Party	7 November 2006 – 28 October 2007
Minister for Foreign Affairs	Helēna Demakova (interim)	People's Party	29 October 2007 – 8 November 2007
Minister for Foreign Affairs	Māris Riekstiņš	People's Party	8 November 2007 – 20 December 2007
Minister for Children and Families	Ainars Baštiks	Latvia's First Party/Latvian Way	7 November 2006 – 20 December 2007
Minister for the Economy	Jurijs Strods	For Fatherland and Freedom/LNNK	7 November 2006 – 17 September 2007
Minister for the Economy	Aigars Kalvītis (interim)	People's Party	7 November 2006 – 22 October 2007
Minister for the Economy	Gaidis Bērziņš (interim)	For Fatherland and Freedom/LNNK	22 October 2007 – 20 December 2007
Minister for Finance	Oskars Spurdziņš	People's Party	7 November 2006 – 20 December 2007
Minister for the Interior	Ivars Godmanis	Latvia's First Party/Latvian Way	7 November 2006 – 20 December 2007
Minister for Education and Science	Baiba Rivža	Union of Greens and Farmers	7 November 2006 – 20 December 2007
Minister for Culture	Helēna Demakova	People's Party	7 November 2006 – 20 December 2007
Minister for Welfare	Dagnija Staķe	Union of Greens and Farmers	7 November 2006 – 31 October 2007
Minister for Welfare	Iveta Purne	Union of Greens and Farmers	8 November 2007 – 20 December 2007
Minister for Regional Development and Local Government	Aigars Štokenbergs	People's Party	7 November 2006 – 19 October 2007
Minister for Regional Development and Local Government	Oskars Spurdziņš (interim)	People's Party	20 October 2007 – 8 November 2007
Minister for Regional Development and Local Government	Edgars Zalāns	People's Party	8 November 2007 – 20 December 2007
Minister for Transport	Ainārs Šlesers	Latvia's First Party/Latvian Way	7 November 2006 – 20 December 2007
Minister for Justice	Gaidis Bērziņš	For Fatherland and Freedom/LNNK	7 November 2006 – 20 December 2007
Minister for Health	Gundars Bērziņš	People's Party	7 November 2006 – 17 January 2007
Minister for Health	Aigars Kalvītis (interim)	People's Party	18 January 2007 – 25 January 2007
Minister for Health	Vinets Veldre	People's Party	25 January 2007 – 20 December 2007
Minister for the Environment	Raimonds Vējonis	Union of Greens and Farmers	7 November 2006 – 20 December 2007
Minister for Agriculture	Mārtiņš Roze	Union of Greens and Farmers	7 November 2006 – 20 December 2007
Special Assignments Minister for Electronic Government	Ina Gudele	Independent	7 November 2006 – 20 December 2007
Special Assignments Minister for Social Integration	Oskars Kastēns	Latvia's First Party/Latvian Way	7 November 2006 – 20 December 2007
Special Assignments Minister for European Union Funds	Normunds Broks	For Fatherland and Freedom/LNNK	7 November 2006 – 20 December 2007
