= First Kalvītis cabinet =

Government of Latvia (2004-2006)

The first Kalvītis cabinet was the government of Latvia from 2 December 2004 to 7 November 2006. It was the first government to be led by Aigars Kalvītis, who was Prime Minister from 2004 to 2007. He took office on 2 December 2004 after the resignation of Indulis Emsis, which had lasted from March to December 2004. The first cabinet was replaced by the second Kalvītis cabinet on 7 November 2006, after the October 2006 election.

Position	Name	Party	Dates
Prime Minister	Aigars Kalvītis	People's Party	2 December 2004 – 7 November 2006
Minister for Defence	Einars Repše	New Era Party	2 December 2004 – 23 December 2005
Minister for Defence	Solvita Āboltiņa (interim)	New Era Party	23 December 2005 – 31 December 2005
Minister for Defence	Krišjānis Kariņš (interim)	New Era Party	1 January 2006 – 5 January 2006
Minister for Defence	Linda Mūrniece	New Era Party	5 January 2006 – 7 April 2006
Minister for Defence	Atis Slakteris	People's Party	8 April 2006 – 7 November 2006
Minister for Foreign Affairs	Artis Pabriks	People's Party	2 December 2004 – 7 November 2006
Minister for Children and Families	Ainars Baštiks	Latvia's First Party	2 December 2004 – 7 November 2006
Minister for the Economy	Krišjānis Kariņš	New Era Party	2 December 2004 – 7 April 2006
Minister for the Economy	Aigars Štokenbergs	People's Party	8 April 2006 – 7 November 2006
Minister for Finance	Oskars Spurdziņš	People's Party	2 December 2004 – 7 November 2006
Minister for the Interior	Ēriks Jēkabsons	Latvia's First Party	2 December 2004 – 21 October 2005
Minister for the Interior	Aigars Kalvītis (interim)	People's Party	21 October 2005 – 3 November 2005
Minister for the Interior	Dzintars Jaundžeikars	Latvia's First Party	3 November 2005 – 7 November 2006
Minister for Education and Science	Ina Druviete	New Era Party	2 December 2004 – 7 April 2006
Minister for Education and Science	Baiba Rivža	Union of Greens and Farmers	8 April 2006 – 7 November 2006
Minister for Culture	Helēna Demakova	People's Party	2 December 2004 – 7 November 2006
Minister for Welfare	Dagnija Staķe	Union of Greens and Farmers	2 December 2004 – 7 November 2006
Minister for Regional Development and Local Government	Māris Kučinskis	People's Party	2 December 2004 – 7 November 2006
Minister for Transport	Ainārs Šlesers	Latvia's First Party	2 December 2004 – 17 March 2006
Minister for Transport	Aigars Kalvītis (interim)	People's Party	17 March 2006 – 7 April 2006
Minister for Transport	Krišjānis Peters	Latvia's First Party	8 April 2006 – 7 November 2006
Minister for Justice	Solvita Āboltiņa	New Era Party	2 December 2004 – 7 April 2006
Minister for Justice	Guntars Grīnvalds	Latvia's First Party	7 April 2006 – 7 November 2006
Minister for Health	Gundars Bērziņš	People's Party	2 December 2004 – 7 November 2006
Minister for the Environment	Raimonds Vējonis	Union of Greens and Farmers	2 December 2004 – 7 November 2006
Minister for Agriculture	Mārtiņš Roze	Union of Greens and Farmers	2 December 2004 – 7 November 2006
Special Assignments Minister for Electronic Government	Jānis Reirs	New Era Party	2 December 2004 – 7 April 2006
Special Assignments Minister for Electronic Government	Ina Gudele	Independent	8 April 2006 – 7 November 2006
Special Assignments Minister for Social Integration	Ainars Latkovskis	New Era Party	2 December 2004 – 7 April 2006
Special Assignments Minister for Social Integration	Karina Pētersone	Latvia's First Party	8 April 2006 – 7 November 2006
