= Second Godmanis cabinet =

The second Godmanis cabinet was the government of Latvia from 20 December 2007 to 12 March 2009. It was the second government to be led by Ivars Godmanis, who was also Prime Minister from 1990 to 1993. It took office on 20 December 2007, after the resignation of Ivars Godmanis, succeeding the second Kalvītis cabinet, which had lasted from 2007 to 2009. It was replaced by the second Dombrovskis cabinet on 3 November 2010, after the October 2010 election.

Position	Name	Party	Dates
Prime Minister	Ivars Godmanis	Latvia's First Party/Latvian Way	20 December 2007 – 12 March 2009
Minister for Defence	Vinets Veldre	People's Party	20 December 2007 – 12 March 2009
Minister for Foreign Affairs	Māris Riekstiņš	People's Party	20 December 2007 – 12 March 2009
Minister for Children, Families, and Integration	Ainars Baštiks	Latvia's First Party/Latvian Way	20 December 2007 – 12 March 2009
Minister for the Economy	Kaspars Gerhards	For Fatherland and Freedom/LNNK	20 December 2007 – 12 March 2009
Minister for Finance	Atis Slakteris	People's Party	20 December 2007 – 12 March 2009
Minister for the Interior	Mareks Segliņš	People's Party	20 December 2007 – 12 March 2009
Minister for Education and Science	Tatjana Koķe	Union of Greens and Farmers	20 December 2007 – 12 March 2009
Minister for Culture	Helēna Demakova	People's Party	20 December 2007 – 14 January 2009
Minister for Culture	Edgars Zalāns (interim)	People's Party	15 January 2009 – 12 March 2009
Minister for Welfare	Iveta Purne	Union of Greens and Farmers	20 December 2007 – 12 March 2009
Minister for Regional Development and Local Government	Edgars Zalāns	People's Party	20 December 2007 – 12 March 2009
Minister for Transport	Ainārs Šlesers	Latvia's First Party/Latvian Way	20 December 2007 – 12 March 2009
Minister for Justice	Gaidis Bērziņš	For Fatherland and Freedom/LNNK	20 December 2007 – 12 March 2009
Minister for Health	Ivars Eglītis	People's Party	20 December 2007 – 12 March 2009
Minister for the Environment	Raimonds Vējonis	Union of Greens and Farmers	20 December 2007 – 12 March 2009
Minister for Agriculture	Mārtiņš Roze	Union of Greens and Farmers	20 December 2007 – 4 February 2009
Minister for Agriculture	Raimonds Vējonis (interim)	Union of Greens and Farmers	5 February 2009 – 12 March 2009
Special Assignments Minister for Electronic Government	Ina Gudele	Union of Greens and Farmers	20 December 2007 – 15 May 2008
Special Assignments Minister for Electronic Government	Signe Bāliņa	Union of Greens and Farmers	15 May 2008 – 12 March 2009
Special Assignments Minister for Social Integration	Oskars Kastēns	Latvia's First Party/Latvian Way	20 December 2007 – 31 December 2008
Special Assignments Minister for European Union Funds	Normunds Broks	For Fatherland and Freedom/LNNK	20 December 2007 – 31 December 2008
