= First Dombrovskis cabinet =

The first Dombrovskis cabinet was the government of Latvia from 12 March 2009 to 3 November 2010. It was the first government to be led by Valdis Dombrovskis, who was Prime Minister from 2009 until 2014. It took office on 12 March 2009, after the resignation of Ivars Godmanis, succeeding the second Godmanis cabinet, which had lasted from 2007 to 2009. It was replaced by the second Dombrovskis cabinet on 3 November 2010, after the October 2010 election.

Position	Name	Party	Dates
Prime Minister	Valdis Dombrovskis	New Era Party	12 March 2009 – 3 November 2010
Minister for Defence	Imants Viesturs Lieģis	Civic Union	12 March 2009 – 3 November 2010
Minister for Foreign Affairs	Māris Riekstiņš	People's Party	12 March 2009 – 22 March 2010
Minister for Foreign Affairs	Māris Riekstiņš (interim)	People's Party	22 March 2010 – 29 April 2010
Minister for Foreign Affairs	Aivis Ronis	Independent	29 April 2010 – 3 November 2010
Minister for Children, Families, and Integration	Valdis Dombrovskis	New Era Party	12 March 2009 – 30 June 2009
Minister for the Economy	Artis Kampars	New Era Party	12 March 2009 – 3 November 2010
Minister for Finance	Einars Repše	New Era Party	12 March 2009 – 3 November 2010
Minister for the Interior	Linda Mūrniece	New Era Party	12 March 2009 – 3 November 2010
Minister for Education and Science	Tatjana Koķe	Union of Greens and Farmers	12 March 2009 – 3 November 2010
Minister for Culture	Ints Dālderis	People's Party	12 March 2009 – 3 November 2010
Minister for Welfare	Uldis Augulis	Union of Greens and Farmers	12 March 2009 – 3 November 2010
Minister for Regional Development and Local Government	Edgars Zalāns	People's Party	12 March 2009 – 22 March 2010
Minister for Regional Development and Local Government	Raimonds Vējonis (interim)	Union of Greens and Farmers	23 March 2010 – 13 May 2010
Minister for Regional Development and Local Government	Dagnija Staķe	Union of Greens and Farmers	13 May 2010 – 3 November 2010
Minister for Transport	Kaspars Gerhards	For Fatherland and Freedom/LNNK	12 March 2009 – 3 November 2010
Minister for Justice	Mareks Segliņš	People's Party	12 March 2009 – 22 March 2010
Minister for Justice	Uldis Augulis (interim)	Union of Greens and Farmers	23 March 2010 – 19 April 2010
Minister for Justice	Imants Viesturs Lieģis (interim)	Civic Union	20 April 2010 – 3 November 2010
Minister for Health	Ivars Eglītis	People's Party	12 March 2009 – 17 June 2009
Minister for Health	Baiba Rozentāle	People's Party	29 June 2009 – 22 March 2010
Minister for Health	Linda Mūrniece (interim)	New Era Party	23 March 2010 – 13 May 2010
Minister for Health	Didzis Gavars	Independent	13 May 2010 – 3 November 2010
Minister for the Environment	Raimonds Vējonis	Union of Greens and Farmers	12 March 2009 – 3 November 2010
Minister for Agriculture	Jānis Dūklavs	Union of Greens and Farmers	12 March 2009 – 3 November 2010
