= Bērziņš cabinet =

Government of Latvia 2000-2002

The Bērziņš cabinet was the government of Latvia from 5 May 2000 until 7 November 2002.

Position	Name	Dates	Party
Prime Minister	Andris Bērziņš	5 May 2000 – 7 November 2002	Latvian Way
Minister for Defence	Ģirts Valdis Kristovskis	5 May 2000 – 7 November 2002	TB/LNNK
Minister for Foreign Affairs	Indulis Bērziņš	5 May 2000 – 7 November 2002	Latvian Way
Minister for the Economy	Aigars Kalvītis	5 May 2000 – 7 November 2002	People's Party
Minister for Finance	Gundars Bērziņš	5 May 2000 – 7 November 2002	People's Party
Minister for the Interior	Mareks Segliņš	5 May 2000 – 30 September 2002	People's Party
Minister for the Interior	Ģirts Valdis Kristovskis (interim)	30 September 2002 – 7 November 2002	TB/LNNK
Minister for Science and Education	Kārlis Greiškalns	5 May 2000 – 7 November 2002	People's Party
Minister for Culture	Karina Pētersone	5 May 2000 – 7 November 2002	Latvian Way
Minister for Welfare	Andrejs Požarnovs	5 May 2000 – 2 May 2002	TB/LNNK
Minister for Welfare	Vladimirs Makarovs (interim)	2 May 2002 – 22 May 2002	TB/LNNK
Minister for Welfare	Viktors Jaksons	22 May 2002 – 7 November 2002	TB/LNNK
Minister for Transport	Anatolijs Gorbunovs	5 May 2000 – 7 November 2002	Latvian Way
Minister for Justice	Ingrīda Labucka	5 May 2000 – 7 November 2002	New Party
Minister for Environment Protection and Regional Development	Vladimirs Makarovs	5 May 2000 – 7 November 2002	TB/LNNK
Minister for Agriculture	Atis Slakteris	5 May 2000 – 7 November 2002	People's Party
Special Assignments Minister for Cooperation to International Financial Organizations	Roberts Zīle	5 May 2000 – 7 November 2002	TB/LNNK
Special Assignments Minister for State Reforms	Jānis Krūmiņš	5 May 2000 – 7 November 2002	New Party
