= List of ministers of regional development and local governments of Latvia =

The minister of regional development and local governments of Latvia was a member of the Cabinet of Ministers of Latvia, and the political leader of the Ministry of Regional Development and Local Governments of Latvia. In 2002, the office was split from the office of the Minister of Environment, and since 2011, merged again.

	Name	Took office	Left office	Party
1	Ivars Gaters	7 November 2002	9 March 2004	New Era Party
2	Andrejs Radzevičs	9 March 2004	2 December 2004	without party
3	Māris Kučinskis	2 December 2004	7 November 2006	People's Party
4	Aigars Štokenbergs	7 November 2006	19 October 2007	People's Party
5	Edgars Zalāns	8 November 2007	17 March 2010	People's Party
6	Dagnija Staķe	13 May 2010	3 November 2010	Union of Greens and Farmers
7	Valdis Dombrovskis	3 November 2010	31 December 2010	New Era Party
