= Government of Latvia =

Republic of Latvia Government Ministru kabinets
- Central Government
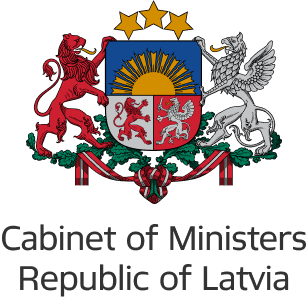
- Logo of the Latvian Government
- Formation: 26 November 1918; 107 years ago
- Extinction: suspended from 1940–1991
- Founding document: Constitution of Latvia
- Country: Latvia
- Website: www.mk.gov.lv/en

President
- Head of state (President): President
- Seat: Riga Castle

Legislative branch
- Legislature: Parliament of Latvia: Saeima
- Meeting place: Latvijas Republikas Saeimas nams, Riga

Executive branch
- Head of government: Prime Minister
- Main body: Cabinet
- Appointed by: President of Latvia
- Headquarters: Riga
- Departments: 15 departments

Judicial branch
- Court: Supreme Court of Latvia
- Seat: Palace of Justice, Riga

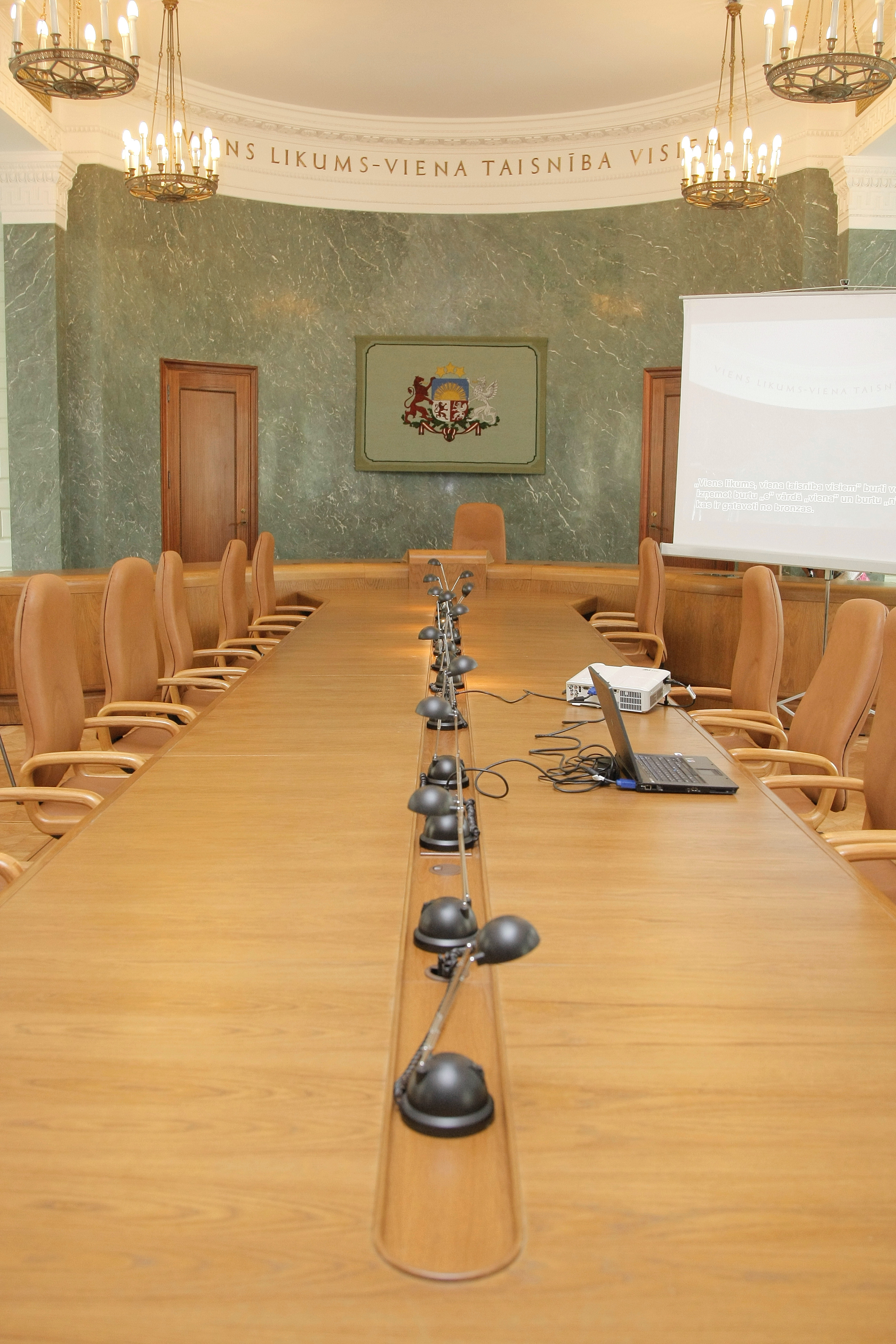
Meeting room of the Government of Latvia in the Palace of Justice

The government of Latvia is the central government of the Republic of Latvia. The Constitution of Latvia (Latvian: Satversme) defines Latvia as a parliamentary republic represented by a unicameral parliament (Saeima) and the Cabinet of Ministers of the Republic of Latvia (Latvian: Latvijas Republikas Ministru kabinets), which form the executive branch of Latvia.

Since the early 2000s cabinet meetings in Latvia have been open to the public. In June 2013, the Latvian government became one of the first in Europe to offer live internet broadcasts of cabinet meetings.

== Current Cabinet of Ministers ==
Position	Name	Party	Dates
Prime Minister	Andris Kulbergs	United list	15 September 2023 –
Minister for Defence	Raivis Melnis	None	15 September 2023 –
Minister for Foreign Affairs	Baiba Braže	New Unity	19 April 2024–
Minister for Economics	Viktors Valainis	Union of Greens and Farmers	15 September 2023 –
Minister for Finance	Arvils Ašeradens	New Unity	14 December 2022 –
Minister for the Interior	Rihards Kozlovskis	New Unity	15 September 2023 –
Minister for Education and Science	Anda Čakša	New Unity	14 December 2022 –
Minister for Climate and Energy	Kaspars Melnis	Union of Greens and Farmers	15 September 2023 –
Minister for Culture	Agnese Lāce	The Progressives	20 June 2024 –
Minister for Welfare	Uldis Augulis	Union of Greens and Farmers	15 September 2023 –
Minister for Transport	Kaspars Briškens	The Progressives	15 September 2023 –
Minister for Justice	Inese Lībiņa-Egnere	New Unity	14 December 2022 –
Minister for Health	Hosams Abu Meri	New Unity	15 September 2023 –
Minister for Environmental Protection and Regional Development	Inga Bērziņa	New Unity	15 September 2020 –
Minister for Agriculture	Armands Krauze	Union of Greens and Farmers	15 September 2023 –

== List of governments ==
	Government	Dates	Prime Minister	Coalition parties
1st	Provisional	18 November 1918 – 11 June 1920	Kārlis Ulmanis	LZS, LRDP, DS, LRP, LNP
2nd	Ulmanis I	20 June 1920 – 18 June 1921	Kārlis Ulmanis	LZS, DS, ENDP, DP, LgZP
3rd	Meierovics I	19 June 1921 – 18 July 1922	Zigfrīds Anna Meierovics	LZS, DP, LgZP, SDML, LTP
4th	Meierovics II	20 July 1922 – 26 January 1923	Zigfrīds Anna Meierovics	LZS, DP, LgZP, SDML
5th	Pauļuks	27 January 1923 – 27 June 1923	Jānis Pauļuks	DC, LZS, LKZS, JS, LSDSP, SDML
6th	Meierovics III	28 June 1923 – 26 January 1924	Zigfrīds Anna Meierovics	LZS, DC, LgZP, LSDSP, LKZS, SDML
7th	Zāmuēls	25 January 1924 – 17 December 1924	Voldemārs Zāmuēls	BPNC, DC, LKZS, JS
8th	Celmiņš	19 December 1924 – 23 December 1925	Hugo Celmiņš	LZS, DC, JS, SDML
9th	Ulmanis II	24 December 1925 – 6 May 1926	Kārlis Ulmanis	LZS, LKZS, LgZP, LJSP, JS, NA
10th	Alberings	7 May 1926 – 18 December 1926	Arturs Alberings	LZS, DC, LJSP, JS, LgZP
11th	Skujenieks I	19 December 1926 – 23 January 1928	Marģers Skujenieks	SDML, LSDSP, DC, PTA, JS
12th	Juraševskis	24 January 1928 – 30 November 1928	Pēteris Juraševskis	DC, KZKP, LgZP, LZS, DbRP
13th	Celmiņš II	1 December 1928 – 26 March 1931	Hugo Celmiņš	LZS, DC, KA, KZKP, LDZA, LJSP, NA, DbRP
14th	Ulmanis III	27 March 1931 – 5 December 1931	Kārlis Ulmanis	LZS, KZKP, LZPA, LJSP, MKRA, NA
15th	Skujenieks II	6 December 1931 – 23 March 1933	Marģers Skujenieks	PA, LZS, DC, LZPA, LJSP
16th	Bļodnieks	24 March 1933 – 16 March 1934	Ādolfs Bļodnieks	LJSP, KZKP, PA, LZS, DC, LZPA, KA
17th	Ulmanis IV	17 March 1934 – 15 May 1934	Kārlis Ulmanis	LZS, KDB, KZKP, LZPA
18th	Ulmanis V	16 May 1934 – 19 June 1940	Kārlis Ulmanis	Authoritarian régime
19th	Kirhenšteins	20 June 1940 – 25 August 1940	Augusts Kirhenšteins	Soviet occupation
Alternating Soviet and Nazi régimes. See Latvian Diplomatic Service in exile.
20th	Godmanis I	7 May 1990 – 3 August 1993	Ivars Godmanis	LTF, LC
21st	Birkavs	3 August 1993 – 19 September 1994	Valdis Birkavs	LC, LZS, LZP
22nd	Gailis	19 September 1994 – 21 December 1995	Māris Gailis	LC, TPA, LZS, LZP, TB
23rd	Šķēle I	21 December 1995 – 13 February 1997	Andris Šķēle	DPS, TB, LC, LNNK, LZS, LZP, LVP
24th	Šķēle II	13 February 1997 – 7 August 1997	Andris Šķēle	DPS, TB, LC, LNNK, LZS, LZP, KDS
25th	Krasts	7 August 1997 – 26 November 1998	Guntars Krasts	TB/LNNK, LC, LZS, LZP, DPS, KTP
26th	Krištopans	26 November 1998 – 16 July 1999	Vilis Krištopans	LC, TB, JP, LSDSP
27th	Šķēle III	16 July 1999 – 5 May 2000	Andris Šķēle	TP, LC, TB/LNNK
28th	Bērziņš	5 May 2000 – 7 November 2002	Andris Bērziņš	LC, TP, TB/LNNK, JP
29th	Repše	7 November 2002 – 9 March 2004	Einars Repše	JL, ZZS, TB/LNNK, LPP
30th	Emsis	9 March 2004 – 2 December 2004	Indulis Emsis	ZZS, TP, LPP
31st	Kalvītis I	2 December 2004 – 7 November 2006	Aigars Kalvītis	TP, ZZS, LPP, JL
32nd	Kalvītis II	7 November 2006 – 20 December 2007	Aigars Kalvītis	TP, ZZS, LPP/LC, TB/LNNK
33rd	Godmanis II	20 December 2007 – 12 March 2009	Ivars Godmanis	LPP/LC, TP, ZZS, TB/LNNK
34th	Dombrovskis I	12 March 2009 – 3 November 2010	Valdis Dombrovskis	JL, TP, ZZS, TB/LNNK, PS
35th	Dombrovskis II	3 November 2010 – 25 October 2011	Valdis Dombrovskis	Unity, ZZS
36th	Dombrovskis III	25 October 2011 – 22 January 2014	Valdis Dombrovskis	Unity, RP, NA
37th	Straujuma I	22 January 2014 – 5 November 2014	Laimdota Straujuma	Unity, RP, NA, ZZS
38th	Straujuma II	5 November 2014 – 11 February 2016	Laimdota Straujuma	Unity, NA, ZZS
39th	Kučinskis	11 February 2016 – 23 January 2019	Māris Kučinskis	Unity, NA, ZZS
40th	Kariņš I	23 January 2019 – 14 December 2022	Krišjānis Kariņš	K, AP!, NA, KPV LV (2019–2021), JV
41st	Kariņš II	14 December 2022 – 15 September 2023	Krišjānis Kariņš	JV, AS, NA
42nd	Siliņa	15 September 2023 – Present	Evika Siliņa	JV, ZZS, PRO

== Gallery ==
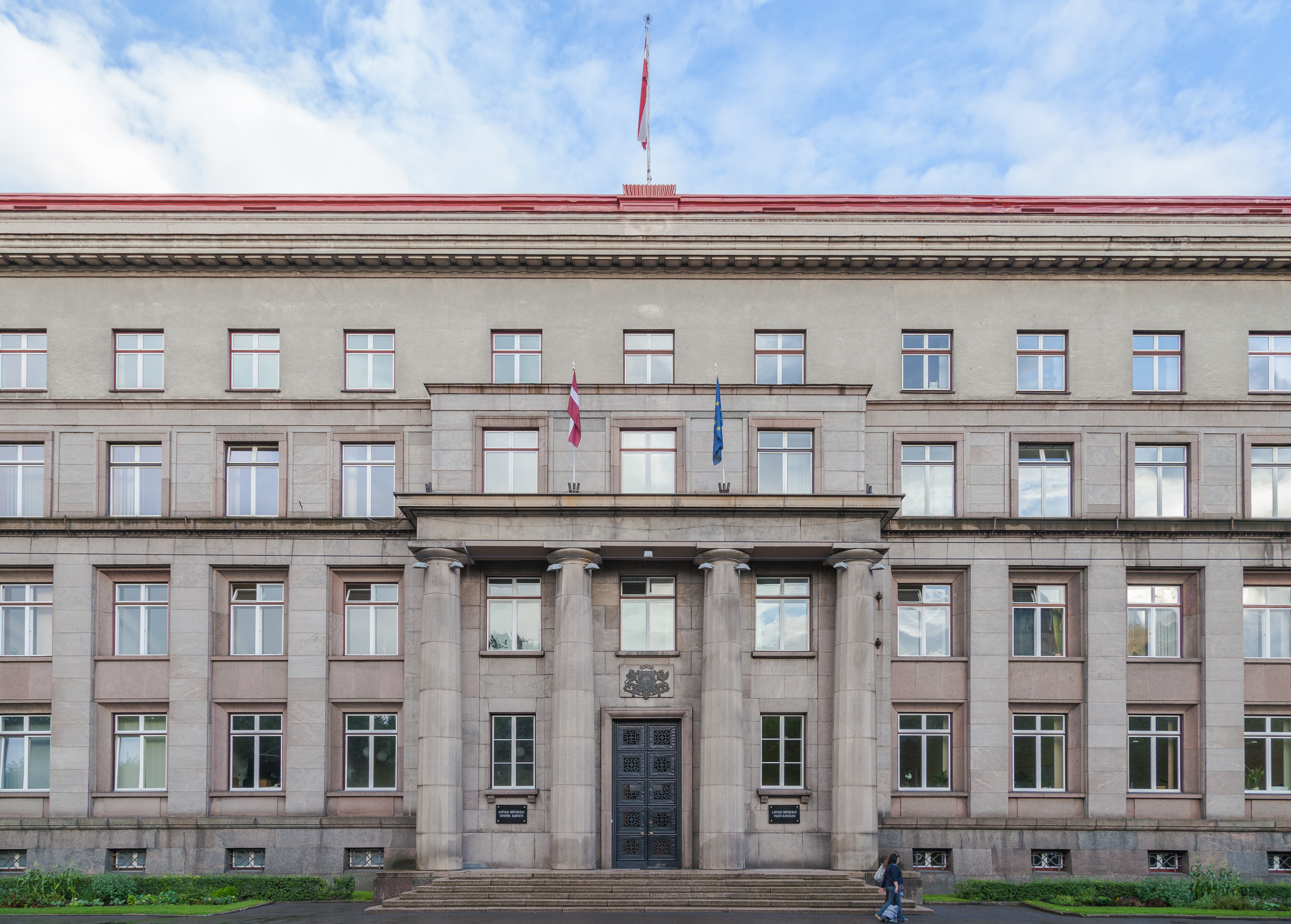
Cabinet of Ministers building (the Palace of Justice) co-located with the Supreme Court.

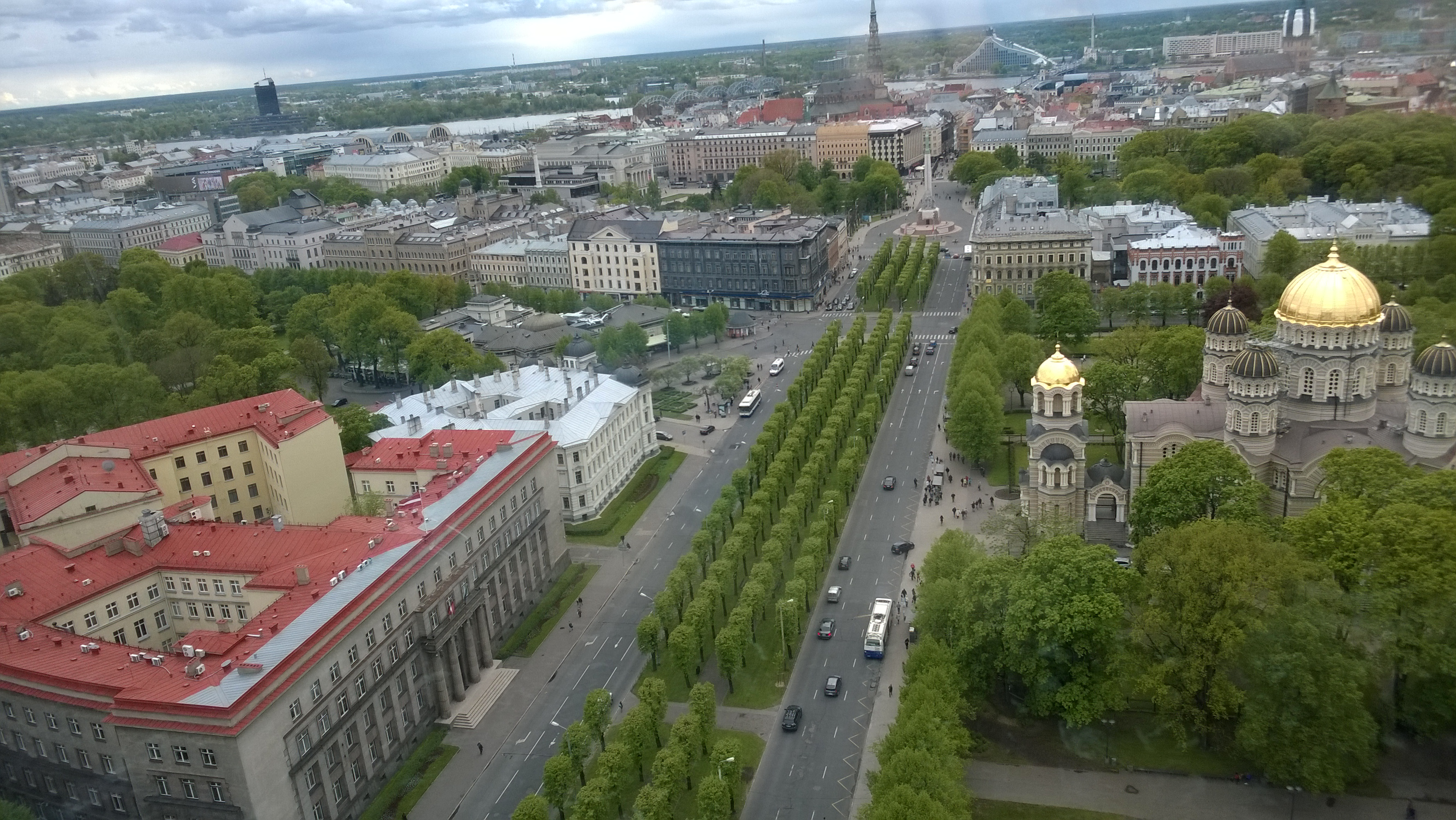
View from Radisson Blu Hotel Latvija.
