= Parties in the European Council during 2005 =

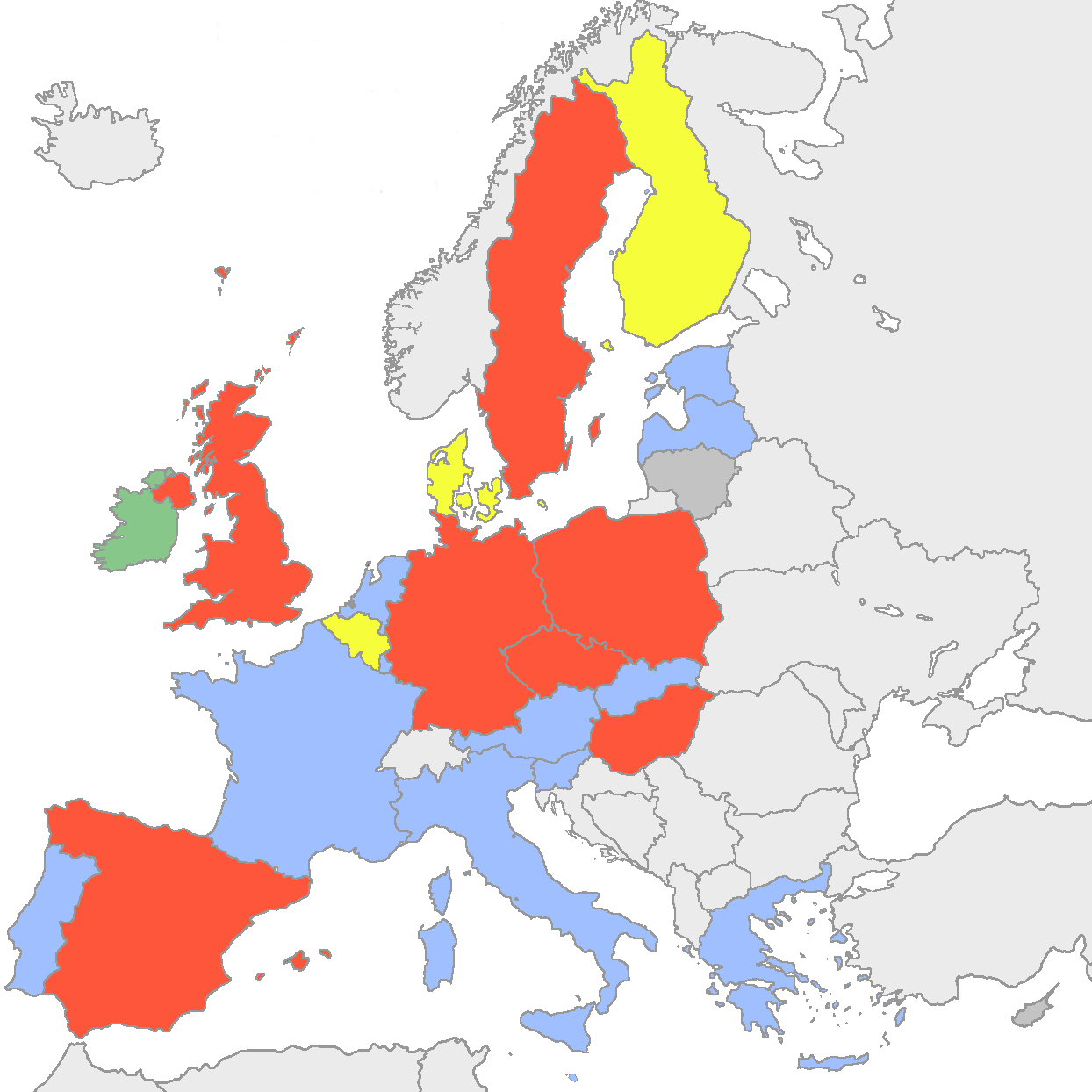
The member-states of the European Union by the European party affiliations of their leaders, as of 1 January 2005.

This article describes the party affiliations of the leaders of each member-state represented in the European Council during the year 2005. The list below gives the political party that each head of government, or head of state, belongs to at the national level, as well as the European political alliance to which that national party belongs. The states are listed from most to least populous. More populous states have greater influence in the council, in accordance with the system of Qualified Majority Voting.

== Summary ==
Party	1 January 2005		25 March 2005		4 April 2005		31 October 2005		22 November 2005
Party	#	QMV	#	QMV	#	QMV	#	QMV	#	QMV
Party of European Socialists	7	146	8	158	8	158	7	131	6	102
European People's Party	12	131	11	119	10	115	10	115	11	144
European Liberal Democrat and Reform Party	3	26	3	26	4	30	4	30	4	30
Independent	2	11	2	11	2	11	2	11	2	11
Alliance for Europe of the Nations	1	7	1	7	1	7	2	34	2	34

== List of leaders (1 January 2005) ==
Member-state	Votes	Leader	National party	European party
Germany	29	Gerhard Schröder	SPD	PES
United Kingdom	29	Tony Blair	Lab	PES
France	29	Jacques Chirac	UMP	EPP
Italy	29	Silvio Berlusconi	FI	EPP
Spain	27	José Luis Rodríguez Zapatero	PSOE	PES
Poland	27	Marek Belka	SLD	PES
Netherlands	13	Jan Peter Balkenende	CDA	EPP
Greece	12	Kostas Karamanlis	ND	EPP
Czech Republic	12	Stanislav Gross	ČSSD	PES
Belgium	12	Guy Verhofstadt	VLD	ELDR
Hungary	12	Ferenc Gyurcsány	MSZP	PES
Portugal	12	Pedro Santana Lopes	PPD/PSD	EPP
Sweden	10	Göran Persson	SAP	PES
Austria	10	Wolfgang Schüssel	ÖVP	EPP
Slovakia	7	Mikuláš Dzurinda	SDKÚ	EPP
Denmark	7	Anders Fogh Rasmussen	V	ELDR
Finland	7	Matti Vanhanen	Kesk.	ELDR
Ireland	7	Bertie Ahern	FF	AEN
Lithuania	7	Valdas Adamkus	Independent
Latvia	4	Aigars Kalvītis	TP	EPP
Slovenia	4	Janez Jansa	SDS	EPP
Estonia	4	Juhan Parts	RP	EPP
Cyprus	4	Tassos Papadopoulos	DIKO	Independent
Luxembourg	4	Jean-Claude Juncker	CSV	EPP
Malta	3	Lawrence Gonzi	PN	EPP

DIKO's MEP is a member of the Alliance of Liberals and Democrats for Europe group in the European Parliament, but the party is not formally attached to any pan-European organization.

== Changes during the year ==
=== Affiliation ===
Date	Member-state	Leader	National party	European party
25 March	Portugal	José Sócrates	PS	PES
4 April	Estonia	Andrus Ansip	RE	ELDR
31 October	Poland	Kazimierz Marcinkiewicz	PiS	AEN
22 November	Germany	Angela Merkel	CDU	EPP

=== Office-holder only ===
Date	Member-state	Leader	National party	European party
25 April	Czech Republic	Jiří Paroubek	ČSSD	PES

== See also ==
- Presidency of the Council of the European Union
