= Zenta Dzividzinska =

Latvian photographer (1944-2011)

- Born: 12 September 1944; Bauska municipality, Latvia
- Died: 13 December 2011 (aged 67); Riga, Latvia
- Occupations: Graphic designer; illustrator
- Known for: Photographs of rural women in Latvia

Zenta Dzividzinska (1944 – 2011) was a Latvian photographer known particularly for images that captured the daily life of three generations of women in the Latvian countryside, which she titled House Near the River.

== Biography ==
Dzividzinska, who often signed herself as ZDZ, was born in Code Parish in the Bauska municipality of Latvia on 12 September 1944. Between 1961 and 1965, she studied at the Riga School of Applied Arts, taking a photographic course in 1964, and between 1965 and 1967 at the Latvian Soviet Socialist Republic State Academy of Art. She did not try to obtain a degree from the academy, even though graduates had greater access to relevant work with the state, as well as access to studios, better housing, and other privileges, as a degree in photography was not offered. Between 1967 and 1993 she worked as a creative artist and designer. During the 1970s she was mainly involved in professional applied graphic design, using different photographic techniques. From the early 1990s, she worked as a book illustrator and photographic editor.

== Photography ==
Dzividzinska joined the Riga Photo Club in 1965. In that year she held her first solo exhibition, Riga Pantomime, in the main art bookshop of Riga, capital of Latvia. The exhibition consisted of black and white photographs that captured the rehearsals and events backstage. Between 1968 and 1972 she participated in other local and international photographic exhibitions. During this prolific period she became known for images of women carrying out daily activities, such as slaughtering pigs, washing babies, doing laundry and chopping cabbage to ferment, which contrasted with photographs taken in Latvia by men, who generally saw women as sensual objects. She was just one of two women in the Riga Photo Club but her work earned the respect of the male members, arguably because she had prints accepted for photo exhibitions overseas, including in Hong Kong, Tokyo, Singapore, Kuala Lumpur, Helsinki and Bordeaux.

Her work in the 1960s was, however, soon forgotten as she concentrated on design work and stopped exhibiting with the Riga Photo Club. Nevertheless, she continued making a collection of documentary photographs under the title House Near the River, recording snapshots of life in her ancestral home, with people engaged in their daily routines. Later she returned to live there, together with her husband Juris Tifentals, a painter, whom she married in 1969. Most of the photographs from this collection have never been exhibited. A few were first shown in Dzividzinska's second solo exhibition, Black and White, held in Riga in 1999. This was followed by another exhibition, called I Don’t Remember a Thing in Riga in 2005. Despite these exhibitions, her idiosyncratic, autobiographical style still faced difficulties in being accepted in Latvia. However, a collection of her prints was selected for the Norton and Nancy Dodge Collection of Soviet Nonconformist Art at the Zimmerli Art Museum at Rutgers University in New Jersey in the US and, in 2021, an exhibition in Vienna organized by Sophie Thun presented some of her previously undeveloped portraits.

== Death and legacy ==
Dzividzinska died on 13 December 2011 and was buried in the Forest Cemetery of Riga. As a result of the work of her daughter, Alise Tifentale, in 2021, part of her archive of negatives, prints, notes and documents was added to the collection of the National Library of Latvia. In February 2022 the Latvian National Museum of Art opened a new permanent exhibition of the work of 12 women photographers, including Dzividzinska.
