= 2009 Riga riot =

Riot in Riga, Latvia

2009 Riga Riot
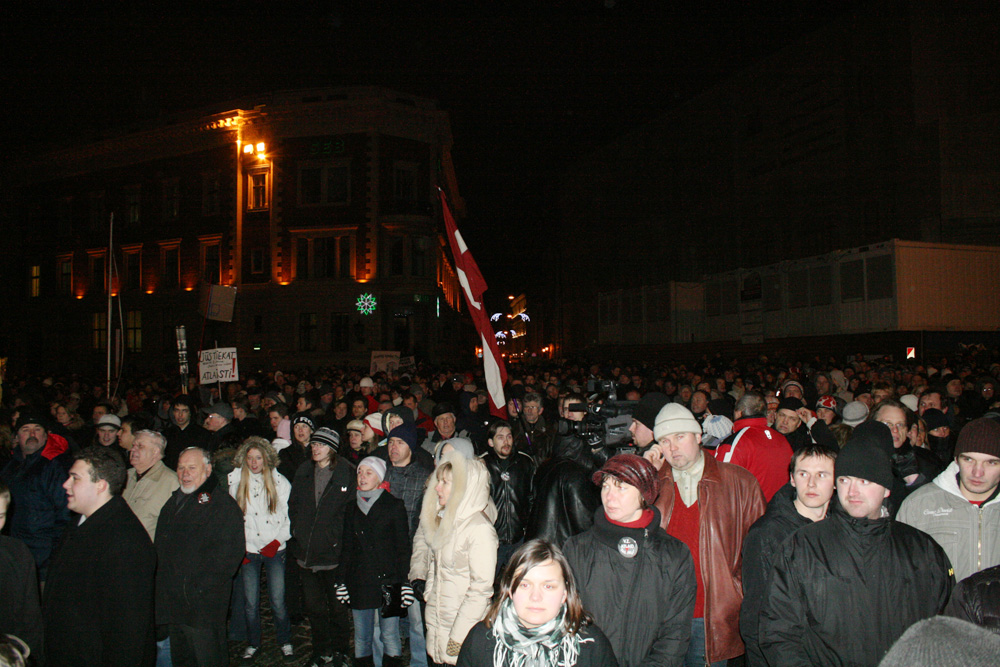
- Date: January 13, 2009
- Location: Riga, Latvia
- Caused by: The 2008 Latvian financial crisis and government austerity policies.
- Goals: Dissolution of the Saeima by the President of Latvia, early elections.

Casualties
- Injuries: At least 30
- Arrested: 126
- Damage: Public and private property.

The 2009 Riga riot was an outbreak of civil unrest in Riga, Latvia, on January 13, 2009, lasting for three hours following the economic downturn of the 2008 Latvian financial crisis as well as political discontent with the Latvian government's continued pursuance of austerity policies. Around 10,000 people gathered for anti-government protests which eventually became violent. The riot was the worst outbreak of violence in Latvia since 1991 when Latvia declared independence from the Soviet Union.

== Background ==
Latvia, which had previously experienced economic growth, found itself grappling with the global economic downturn, depleting central bank reserves, and expectations of a 5% GDP contraction in its GDP for 2009. As salaries were projected to decrease and unemployment to rise, public frustration escalated, culminating in the protests.

Before the riot, the All for Latvia party organized a rally demanding that the President of Latvia dissolve the Saeima as well as call early elections. Protesters were concerned mainly with the competence of their political administration, corruption and the economic downturn caused by the 2008 Latvian financial crisis. The financial crisis resulted in a recession and an unemployment crisis after Latvia had been the fastest growing economy in Europe for several consecutive years.

These demonstrations were part of a wider trend in the region, with Greece and Bulgaria also experiencing unrest over similar issues like economic stagnation, poverty, corruption, and problems within the education system.

== Riot ==
After the crowd had become violent, some attempted to storm the Saeima but were repulsed by riot police with Mace, truncheons and tear gas. After the failed attempt at storming the parliament, ice, rocks and other debris were thrown at government buildings as well as police. After the rioters had been dispersed by police they regrouped at Vecrīga where the smashing of windows as well as the looting of shops began.

== Aftermath ==
Following the riot, 126 people were arrested and at least 30 injured, although these numbers are disputed. On February 20, the cabinet of prime minister Ivars Godmanis was dissolved and he resigned his position as head of the government. Similar protests took place in Vilnius, Lithuania, three days after the protest in Riga, these protests also ending in similar riots.

The Social Democratic Party "Harmony" gained considerable popularity after the riots.

== See also ==
- 2008 Greek riots
- 2008 financial crisis
- Credit Crunch
