= Dagnija Staķe =

Latvian politician

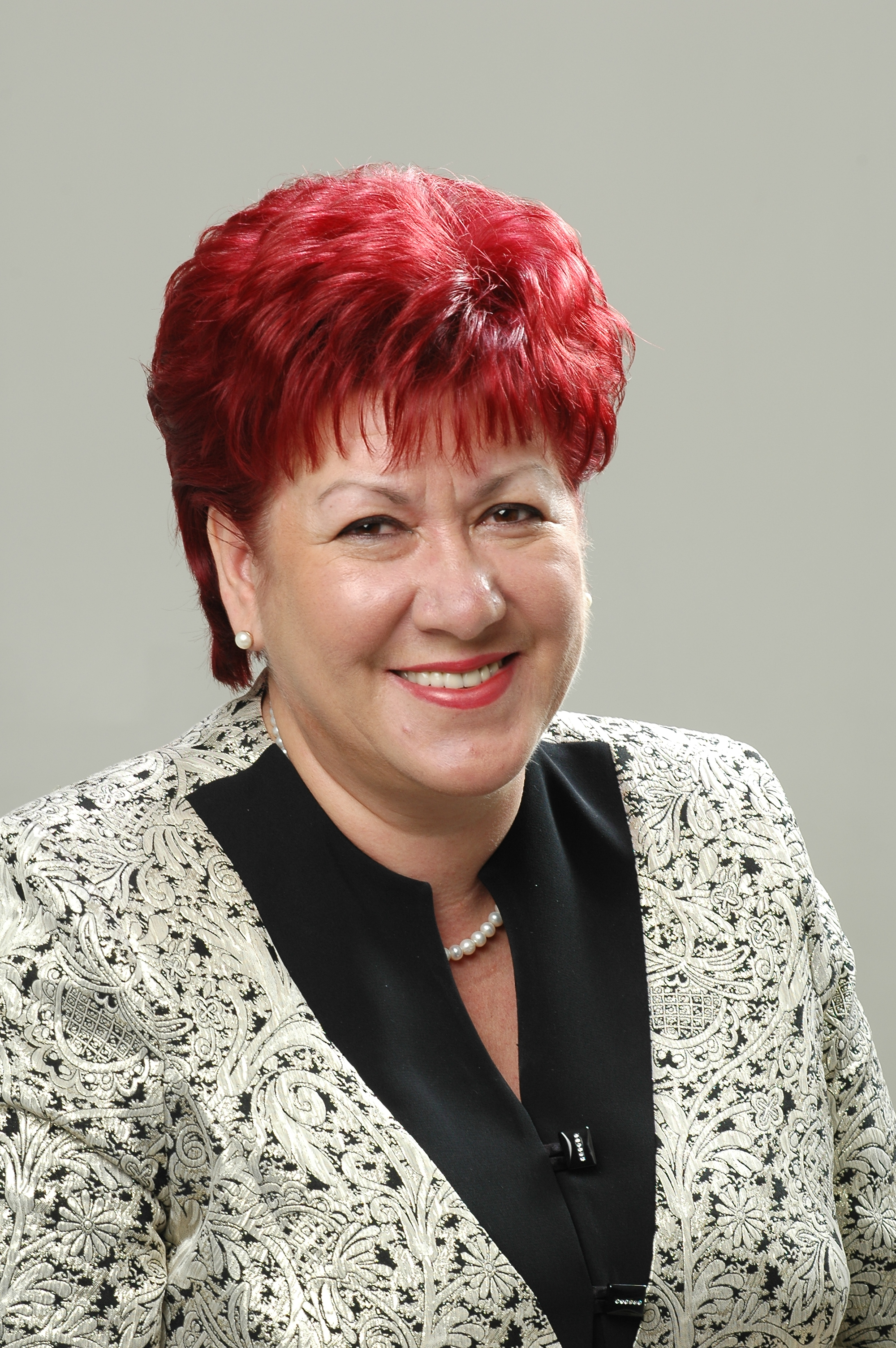
- Staķe in 2005

Minister of Regional Development and Local Governments
- In office 13 May – 3 November 2010
- President: Valdis Zatlers
- Prime Minister: Valdis Dombrovskis
- Preceded by: Edgars Zalāns
- Succeeded by: Valdis Dombrovskis

Member of the 9th Saeima
- In office 15 November 2007 – 2 November 2010
- In office 7–16 November 2006

Minister of Welfare
- In office 7 November 2002 – 15 November 2007
- President: Valdis Zatlers; Vaira Vīķe-Freiberga
- Prime Minister: Aigars Kalvītis; Indulis Emsis; Einars Repše
- Preceded by: Viktors Jaksons
- Succeeded by: Iveta Purne

Personal details
- Born: 3 September 1951 (age 74) Vietalva Parish, Latvian SSR, Soviet Union
- Party: Union of Greens and Farmers
- Other political affiliations: Latvian Farmers' Union
- Children: Mārtiņš Staķis

Dagnija Staķe (born 3 September 1951, Vietalva parish) is a Latvian politician (Latvian Farmers' Union) and the Minister of Regional Development and Local Governments of Latvia from 13 May to 3 November 2010.
