= Ministry of Justice (Latvia) =

Government ministry of Latvia

The Ministry of Justice of the Republic of Latvia, established in 1918, holds the prominent position as the primary state governing body responsible for overseeing matters related to justice. It serves as the supreme authority for subordinate public administration institutions operating within the justice sector.

At the political level, the Ministry is headed by the Minister of Justice. The ministry receives support from the Secretary of State. The State Secretary assumes essential responsibilities, including organizing the development of sectoral policies and strategies, implementing sectoral policies, managing administrative tasks within the institution, and coordinating the execution of the Ministry's functions.

== List of ministers ==
=== Republic of Latvia (1918–1940) ===
Minister of Justice (1918–1940)
#	First name, surname (Date of birth – Date of death)	Term of office	Political party / affiliation	The Cabinet of Ministers	Notes
1	Pēteris Juraševskis (1872–1942)	19 November 1918 – 14 March 1919	not known	Latvian Provisional Government	
2	Eduards Strautnieks (1886–1946)	14 March 1919 – 13 July 1919	Latvian Republican Party	Latvian Provisional Government	
3	Edvins Magnus (1888–1974)	14 July 1919 – 8 December 1919	German-Baltic Reform Party	Latvian Provisional Government	
4	Kārlis Pauļuks (1870–1945)	9 December 1919 – 11 June 1920	Latvian Farmers' Union	Latvian Provisional Government	
5	Rūdolfs Bēnuss (1881–1940)	12 June 1920 – 18 June 1921	Workers' Party	First Ulmanis cabinet	
6	Vilis Holcmanis (1889–1941)	19 June 1921 – 26 January 1924	Union of Social Democrats – Mensheviks and Rural Workers	First Meierovics cabinet	
6	Vilis Holcmanis (1889–1941)	19 June 1921 – 26 January 1924	Union of Social Democrats – Mensheviks and Rural Workers	Second Meierovics cabinet	
6	Vilis Holcmanis (1889–1941)	19 June 1921 – 26 January 1924	Union of Social Democrats – Mensheviks and Rural Workers	Pauļuks cabinet	
6	Vilis Holcmanis (1889–1941)	19 June 1921 – 26 January 1924	Union of Social Democrats – Mensheviks and Rural Workers	Third Meierovics cabinet	
7	Voldemārs Zāmuēls (1872–1948)	25 January 1924 – 10 April 1924	Democratic Center	Zāmuels cabinet	
8	Julījs Arājs (1884–1967)	10 April 1924 – 17 December 1924	Democratic Center	Zāmuels cabinet	
17 December 1924 – 3 March 1925, nobody accepted the post.				First Celmiņš cabinet	
(1.)	Pēteris Juraševskis (1872–1942)	Mar – 23 December 1925	Democratic Centre	First Celmiņš cabinet	2nd time
24 December 1925 – 26 January 1926, nobody accepted the post				Second Ulmanis cabinet	
9	Ansis Petrevics (1882–1941)	26 January 1926 – 6 May 1926	National Union	Second Ulmanis cabinet	
10	Erasts Bite (1880–1942)	7 May 1926 – 26 October 1927	Democratic Centre	Alberings cabinet	
11	Juris Pabērzs (1891–1961)	27 November 1927 – 14 November 1927	Progressive People's Association	Alberings cabinet	
11	Juris Pabērzs (1891–1961)	27 November 1927 – 14 November 1927	Progressive People's Association	First Skujenieks cabinet	
14 November 1927 – 24 January 1928, nobody accepted the post.				First Skujenieks cabinet	
(3.)	Edvins Magnuss (1888–1974)	24 January 1928 – 30 November 1928	German-Baltic Reform Party	Juraševskis cabinet	2nd time
12	Baldvins Disterlo (1869–1937)	1 December 1928 – 23 January 1929	German-Baltic Reform Party	Second Celmiņš cabinet	
13	Bernhards Bērents (1892–1946)	24 January 1929 – 27 November 1929	German-Baltic Reform Party	Second Celmiņš cabinet	
27 November 1929 – 19 December 1929, nobody accepted the post				Second Celmiņš cabinet	
(11.)	Juris Pabērzs (1891–1961)	19 December 1929 – 5 December 1931	Progressive people's association (until 14 June 1931)	Second Celmiņš cabinet	2nd time
(11.)	Juris Pabērzs (1891–1961)	19 December 1929 – 5 December 1931	Latgale Progressive Farmers Association (from 14 June 1931)	Third Ulmanis cabinet	2nd time
14	Atis Ķeniņš (1874–1961)	6 December 1931 – 23 March 1933	Democratic Center	Second Skujenieks cabinet	
15	Antons Ozols (1878–1956)	24 March 1933 – 16 March 1934	Christian National Union	Bļodnieks cabinet	
16	Jānis Balodis (1881–1965)	17 March 1934 – 15 May 1934	Latvian Farmers' Union	Fourth Ulmanis cabinet	
17	Hermanis Apsītis (1893–1942)	16 May 1934 – 19 June 1940	No party affiliation	Fifth Ulmanis cabinet	
(11.)	Juris Pabērzs (1891–1961)	21 June 1940 – 21 July 1940	No party affiliation	Kirhenšteins cabinet	3rd time

=== Soviet Socialist Republic of Latvia (1940–1990) ===
Minister of Justice (1940–1990)
#	First name, surname (Lifespan)	Term of office	Political party / affiliation	Notes
-	Andrejs Jablonskis (1880–1951)	13 August 1940 – March 1951	Latvian Communist Party	
-	Emīlija Veinberga (1896–1989) [1st female]	March 1951 – October 1959	Latvian Communist Party	
-	Jānis Dzenītis (1929–2001)	October 1970 – March 1980	Latvian Communist Party	
-	Vladimirs Laiviņš (1940–1991)	March 1980 – January 1985	Latvian Communist Party	
-	Jānis Salenieks (b. 1948)	January 1985 – July 1988	Latvian Communist Party	
-	Viktors Skudra (1943–2011)	July 1988 – 7 May 1990	Latvian Communist Party	

=== Republic of Latvia (1990–present day) ===
Minister for Justice (1990–present)
#	First name, surname (Lifespan)	Term of office	Political party / affiliation	The Cabinet of Ministers	Notes
18.	Viktors Skudra (1943–2011)	5 June 1990 – 18 May 1993	Latvian People's Front	Council of Ministers of the Republic of Latvia	
19.	Egils Levits (b. 1955)	8 March 1993 – 19 September 1994	Latvian Way	Birkavs cabinet	
20.	Romāns Apsītis (1939–2022)	19 September 1994 – 21 December 1995	Latvian Way	Gailis cabinet	
21	Dzintars Rasnačs (b. 1963)	21 December 1995 – 26 November 1998	For Fatherland and Freedom (until 7 August 1997)	First Šķēle cabinet	
21	Dzintars Rasnačs (b. 1963)	21 December 1995 – 26 November 1998	For Fatherland and Freedom (until 7 August 1997)	Second Šķēle cabinet	
21	Dzintars Rasnačs (b. 1963)	21 December 1995 – 26 November 1998	For Fatherland and Freedom / LNNK (from 7 August 1997)	Krasts cabinet	
22	Ingrīda Labucka (b. 1963)	26 November 1998 – 16 July 1999	New party	Krištopans cabinet	
23	Valdis Birkavs (b. 1942)	16 July 1999 – 5 May 2000	Latvian Way	Third Sķēle cabinet	
(22.)	Ingrīda Labucka (b. 1963)	5 May 2000 – 7 November 2002	New party	Bērziņš cabinet	2nd time
24	Aivars Aksenoks (b. 1961)	7 November 2002 – 9 March 2004	New Era Party	Repše cabinet	
25	Vineta Muižniece (b. 1956)	3 September 2004 – 2 December 2004	People's party	Emša cabinet	
26	Solvita Āboltiņa (b. 1963)	2 December 2004 – 7 April 2006	New Era Party	First Kalvitis cabinet	
27	Guntars Grīnvalds (b. 1973)	8 April 2006 – 7 November 2006	Latvia's First Party	First Kalvitis cabinet	
28	Gaidis Bērziņš (b. 1970)	7 November 2006 – 12 March 2009	Fatherland and Freedom / LNNK	Second Godmanis cabinet	
29	Mareks Segliņš (b. 1970)	12 March 2009 – 22 March 2010	People's Party	First Dombrovskis cabinet	
-	Uldis Augulis (b. 1972)	23 March 2010 – 19 April 2010	Union of Greens and Farmers	First Dombrovskis cabinet	duty officer
-	Imants Lieģis (b. 1955)	20 April 2010 – 3 November 2010	Civic Union	First Dombrovskis cabinet	duty officer
30	Aigars Štokenbergs (b. 1963)	3 November 2010–25 October 2011	Unity (Society for Political Change) (until 6 August 2011)	Second Dombrovskis cabinet	
30	Aigars Štokenbergs (b. 1963)	3 November 2010–25 October 2011	Unity (from 6 August 2011)	Second Dombrovskis cabinet	
(28.)	Gaidis Bērziņš (b. 1970)	25 October 2011 – 21 June 2012	National Alliance "All For Latvia!" – "For Fatherland and Freedom/LNNK"	Third Dombrovskis cabinet	2nd time
-	Žaneta Jaunzeme-Grende (b. 1964)	21 June 2012 – 5 July 2012	National Alliance "All For Latvia!" – "For Fatherland and Freedom/LNNK"	Third Dombrovskis cabinet	acting officer
31	Jānis Bordāns (b. 1967)	5 July 2012 – 22 January 2014	Without Party (until 18 July 2012)	Third Dombrovskis cabinet	
31	Jānis Bordāns (b. 1967)	5 July 2012 – 22 January 2014	National Alliance "All For Latvia!" – "For Fatherland and Freedom/LNNK" (18 July 2012 – 1 November 2013)	Third Dombrovskis cabinet	
31	Jānis Bordāns (b. 1967)	5 July 2012 – 22 January 2014	Without the party (from 1 November 2013 )	Third Dombrovskis cabinet	
32	Baiba Broka (b. 1975)	22 January 2014 – 6 August 2014	National Alliance "All For Latvia!" – "For Fatherland and Freedom/LNNK"	First Straujuma cabinet	
-	Dace Melbārde (b. 1971)	6 August 2014 – 21 August 2014	Without party	First Straujuma cabinet	acting officer
(28.)	Gaidis Bērziņš (b. 1970)	21 August 2014 – 5 November 2014	National Alliance	First Straujuma cabinet	3rd time
(21.)	Dzintars Rasnačs (b. 1963)	5 November 2014 – 23 January 2019	National Alliance	Second Straujuma cabinet	
(21.)	Dzintars Rasnačs (b. 1963)	5 November 2014 – 23 January 2019	National Alliance	Kučinskis cabinet	
(31.)	Jānis Bordāns (b. 1967)	23 January 2019 – 14 December 2022	The Conservatives	First Kariņš cabinet	2nd time
33.	Inese Lībiņa-Egnere (b. 1977)	14 December 2022 – 29 May 2026	New Unity	Second Kariņš cabinet	
33.	Inese Lībiņa-Egnere (b. 1977)	14 December 2022 – 29 May 2026	New Unity	Siliņa cabinet	
34.	Edvards Smiltēns (b. 1984)	29 May 2026 - present	United List	Kulbergs cabinet	

== See also ==
- Justice ministry
- Latvijas Republikas Tieslietu ministrija (Ministry of Justice of Latvia)
- Latvijas Republikas tieslietu ministru uzskaitījums (List of Justice Ministers of the Republic of Latvia)
- Politics of Latvia
