= Helēna Demakova =

Latvian politician (born 1959)

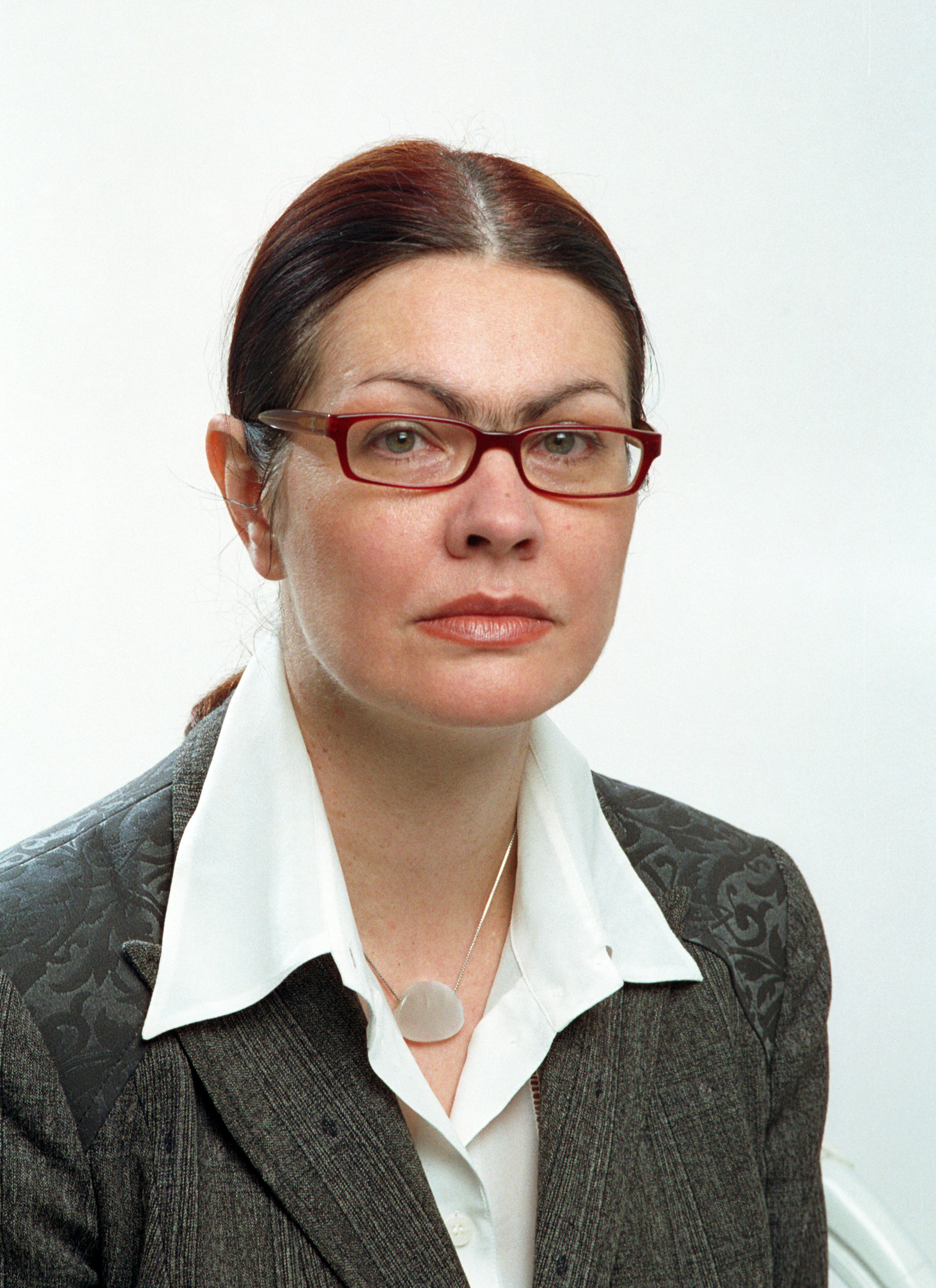

Minister of Culture of Latvia
- In office 9 March 2004 – 12 January 2009
- President: Valdis Zatlers
- Prime Minister: Indulis Emsis; Aigars Kalvītis; Ivars Godmanis
- Preceded by: Inguna Rībena
- Succeeded by: Ints Dālderis (since 12 March 2009)

Personal details
- Born: 3 September 1959 (age 67) Riga, Latvian SSR, USSR
- Party: People’s Party (1998—2011)
- Education: University of Latvia; Art Academy of Latvia; Latvian Academy of Culture
- Occupation: art historian
- Awards: Order of the Three Stars; Order of Arts and Letters; Medal for Merit to Culture

Helēna Demakova (born September 3, 1959) is a Latvian art historian, curator of art exhibitions, and politician. She served as Culture Minister of Latvia from 2004 until 2009 and was a Member of the 9th Saeima (Parliament of Latvia) and lecturer at the Art Academy of Latvia.

== Education ==
Demakova was a private pupil of painter Marina Ainbindere from 1978–1982, completing a three-year programme of preparatory courses at the Art Academy of Latvia. She received a BA from the Faculty of Foreign Languages of the University of Latvia in 1987, and an MA in Arts from the Latvian Academy of Culture in 2007.

== Professional career ==
Demakova began curating exhibitions in 1990 and implemented around forty Latvian and international exhibitions. Her curating work focuses mainly on contemporary art from Latvia and the Baltic Sea region, including the latter years of the Soviet era and art in public spaces.

From 1998-2002, Demakova was the People's Party deputy (MP) of the Latvian Saeima (Parliament). From 2004-2009 she was the Minister of Culture of the Republic of Latvia. Soon after taking the position, she emphasized the importance of preserving Latvian language, history and culture to the national identity of the country. She did not renew her position in 2009, however due to health problems. She was diagnosed with a bone infection.

Significant initiatives undertaken during Demakova's political career include additions to technology and infrastructure in Latvia to support culture and arts. In the late 1990s, Demakova secured grants and support for a Latvian Library Consortium, which unfortunately did not work out as planned. She continued working towards a national library for the country, however. Demakova was very involved with the beginning of the construction of the National Library of Latvia (2008). The library construction almost immediately began to suffer attacks from opponents of the library. Jaunais Laiks, the right-wing opposition party tried to stop the project. Demakova fought especially hard to ensure that the library was built, even strongly criticizing the President of Latvia, Valdis Zatlers. She was also involved with the launching of the Heritage 2018 (Mantojums 2018) programme, which foresees the renovation of all state-owned buildings serving as cultural monuments (2006); the beginning of a programme to construct concert halls in regional urban centres (2007), leading to the opening of brand new concert halls in the cities of Rēzekne (2013), Cēsis (2014) and Liepāja (2015); and directing the competition for the construction of a monument to commemorate the victims of the occupying Soviet regime (2007).

Demakova also took part in directing several large-scale cultural festivals, including Surprising Latvia (Pārsteidzošā Latvija, 2005, France); French Spring (Francijas pavasaris, 2007, Latvia); Oh! Germany (O! Vācija, German culture festival, Latvia, 2008); Latvian Culture Festival in Russia (2007/2008); and the Russian Culture Festival in Latvia (2008).

In 2005, during her tenure as Minister of Culture, Demakova signed an agreement with the ABLV Bank on the creation of an art collection for the future Latvian Contemporary Art Museum. Also during her term in office as Minister of Culture, the Sinfonietta Riga chamber orchestra was founded (2006); the Writers’ and Translators’ House was set up in Ventspils (2006); the Bill and Melinda Gates Foundation contributed a matching grant of 16.2-million-USD for the installation of computers at Latvia's municipal libraries (2006); the Latvian Cultural Canon was launched (2007); the Museum of Romans Suta and Aleksandra Beļcova was founded and inaugurated as a branch of the Latvian National Museum of Art (2008); state financing began to be allocated for cultural events at the Spīķeri concert hall and the kim? Centre for Contemporary Art, both of which are located in Spīķeri Quarter near Riga's central market (2008); and the reconstruction of the Daile theatre in Riga was begun and completed.

During the 2008 financial crisis, projects to construct a new concert hall in Riga and the Riga Contemporary Art Museum were suspended until the mid-2010s, when both projects (collectively dubbed the "Three Brothers" (Latvian: Trīs brāļi) program together with the National Library) regained traction.

== Awards ==
- Commander of the Order of the Three Stars (Latvia, 23 October 2014)
- Commander of the Order of Arts and Letters, the highest French award in the field of culture (France, 2007)
- Medal for Merit to Culture (as Helena Demakowa, Poland, 2005)

== Selected curated exhibitions ==
- Midsommer's Night Dream (Sapnis vasaras naktī) at the Rauma Biennale Balticum 1994, Rauma Art Museum, Finland
- Monument (Piemineklis.). International exhibition at public spaces in Riga, 1995
- Port of Art. International exhibition at public spaces in Kotka, Finland, 1995
- Latvian segment of “Personal Time. Latvian, Estonian and Lithuanian Art. 1945–1996.” Zachęta National Gallery of Art, Warsaw, Poland and Manege, Saint Petersburg, Russia, 1996
- Stories, Storytellers. Latvia's national pavilion at the Venice Biennale, 1999;
- Riga 800 Magic Flute, Latvia's national pavilion at the Venice Biennale, 2001;
- Baltic Security! Arlanda Airport, Stockholm, 2000;
- 2 SHOW exhibition of works by young Latvian and Lithuanian artists (together with Kęstutis Kuizinas), Contemporary Arts Centre, Vilnius, 2003;
- Permanent art exhibition, Stockholm School of Economics in Riga, 2005;
- Permanent large-format installation by Dmitry Gutov, Art Museum Riga Bourse, 2012.
- Test. Exhibition of works from the collection of the future Riga Contemporary Art Museum at the Latvian National Museum of Art, 2012
- Greatings Head! (Sveika, galva!) Exhibition of Latvian contemporary art, Latvian Railway History Museum, 2014
- The Self. History of Latvian Contemporary Art (Patība. Latvijas laikmetīgās mākslas vesture), National Library of Latvia, 2014-2015
- Inauguration of the long-term Art in the Public Space programme in Riga, as part of the activities of the Boris and Inara Teterev Foundation, 2014–present

== Selected publications ==
- Demakova, Helēna, compiler and editor-in-chief. The Self. Personalities on the Road to Contemporary Art – the 1960s-1980s in Soviet Latvia (Patība. Personības ceļā uz laikmetīgo mākslu — Padomju Latvijas 60.–80. gadi). Riga: Ministry of Culture of the Republic of Latvia, 2011. In Latvian
- Demakova, Helēna. They Wouldn’t Notice. Latvian Contemporary Art and the International Context / Nepamanīs. Latvijas laikmetīgā māksla un starptautiskais konteksts. Riga: Satori, 2010. In Latvian and English
- Demakova, Helēna. Different Conversations: Writings on Art and Culture / Citas sarunas: raksti par mākslu un kultūru. Riga: Visual Communications Department of the Art Academy of Latvia, 2002. In Latvian and English
- Demakova, Helēna, compiler and editor-in-chief. Riga 800 Magic Flute / Rīgas astoņsimtgades Burvju flauta (Catalogue of international contemporary art at the 49th Venice Biennale). Riga: Latvian Centre for Contemporary Art, 2001. In Latvian and English
- Karlstrom, Paul J. Raimonds Staprans: Art of Tranquility and Turbulence. With essays by Helāna Demakova and Peter Selz. Seattle, London: University of Washington Press, 2005
- Demakova, Helēna. “Monument revisited”. In Primary Documents: a Sourcebook for Eastern and Central European Art since the 1950s. Ed. Laura Hoptman, Tomáš Pospiszyl. New York: Museum of Modern Art, 2002
- Demakova, Helēna. “Apple Harvest or Art in Latvia 1945–1995: Between Personal and Ideological Time”. In Personal Time: Art of Estonia, Latvia and Lithuania 1945–1996. Anda Rottenberg, Galeria Zachęta. Catalogue of an exhibition held jointly at the Zachȩta Gallery of Contemporary Art, Warsaw and the Centre for Contemporary Art Ujazdowski Castle, Warsaw, 9 September-13 October 1996. Warsaw: Zachęta Gallery of Contemporary Art, 1996

== Social activities ==
- President of the Association of Friends of Marcel Proust in Riga (since 2010)
- Chairperson of the board of the association for Creation of the Content of Riga’s Contemporary Art Museum (Biedrība Rīgas Laikmetīgās mākslas muzeja satura veidošanai, since 2014)
- Founder of the Baltic-Black Sea Alliance association (Baltijas-Melnās jūras alianse, 2008)
- Member of the scientific council of the Latvian National Museum of Art (since 2010)
- Member of the international council of experts of the future Riga Contemporary Art Museum (since 2005)
- Member of the council of experts addressing the creation of the future Riga Contemporary Art Museum (since 2014)
- Member of the Honorary Council of the Association of the Museum of the Occupation of Latvia (since 2008)
- Member of the Artists' Union of Latvia (since 1989)
