= Mārtiņš Roze =

Latvian politician (1964–2012)

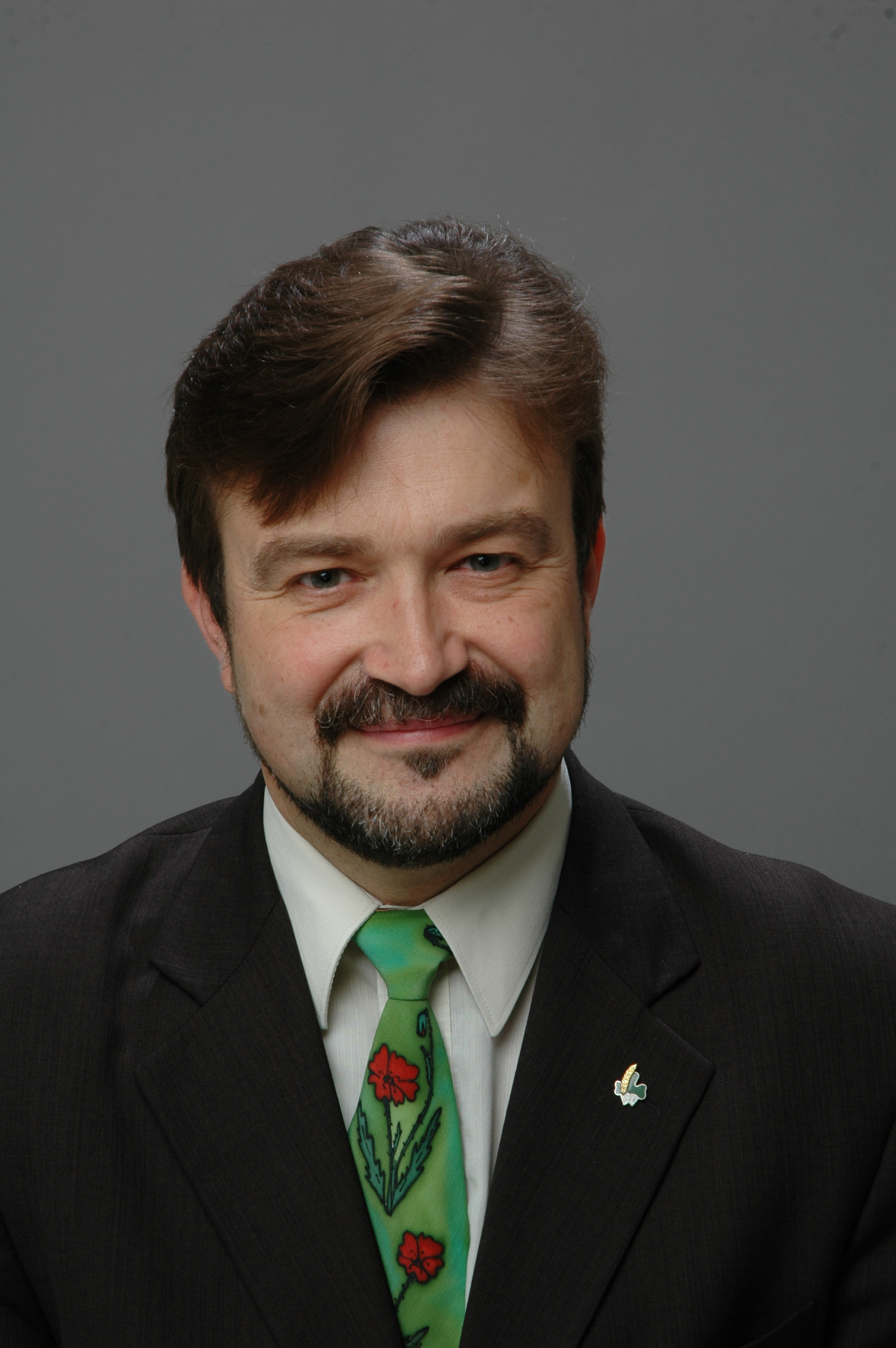

Minister for Agriculture of Latvia
- In office 7 November 2002 – 4 February 2009
- Prime Minister: Einars Repše; Indulis Emsis; Aigars Kalvītis; Ivars Godmanis
- Preceded by: Atis Slakteris
- Succeeded by: Jānis Dūklavs

Personal details
- Born: 28 September 1964 Riga, Latvian SSR
- Died: 8 September 2012 (aged 47) Liepāja, Latvia
- Party: Latvian Farmers' Union
- Spouse: Inese
- Education: University of Latvia

Mārtiņš Roze (28 September 1964 – 8 September 2012) was a Latvian politician. From 2002 till 2009 he was Minister for Agriculture of Latvia. He was member of Latvian Farmers' Union. He graduated from the University of Latvia.
