= 2008 Latvian financial crisis =

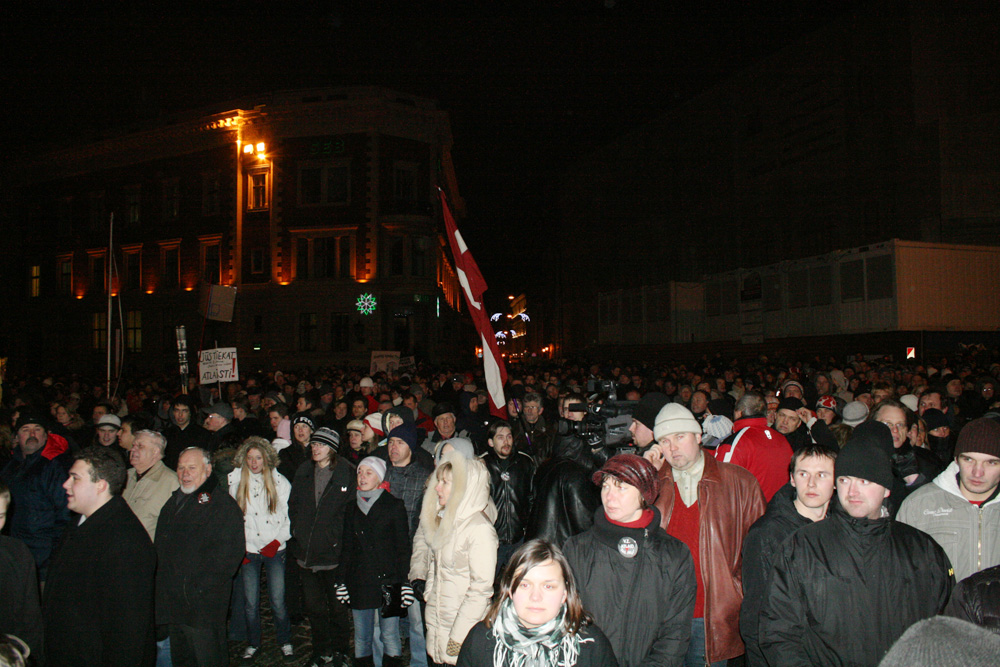
2009 Riga protests

The 2008 Latvian financial crisis, which stemmed from the 2008 global financial crisis, was a major economic and political crisis in Latvia. The crisis was generated when an easy credit market burst, resulting in an unemployment crisis, along with the bankruptcy of many companies. Since 2010, economic activity has recovered and Latvia's economic growth rate was the fastest among the EU member states in the first three quarters of 2012.

== Development ==
In 2008, following years of booming economic success, the Latvian economy took one of the sharpest downturns in the world, picking up pace in the last quarter in which GDP contracted by 10.5%. In February 2009 the Latvian government asked the International Monetary Fund and the European Union for an emergency bailout loan of 7.5 billion Euros, while at the same time the government nationalized Parex Bank, the country's second largest bank.

On concerns of bankruptcy, Standard & Poors subsequently downgraded Latvia's credit rating to non-investment grade BB+, or "junk", its worst ever rating. Its rating was put on negative outlook, which indicates a possible further cut. On February 20 the Latvian coalition government headed by Prime Minister of Latvia Ivars Godmanis collapsed.

The Baltic states were amongst the worst hit by the Great Recession. In December 2008, the Latvian unemployment rate stood at 7%. By December 2009, the figure had risen to 22.8%. The number of unemployed has more than tripled since the onset of the crisis, giving Latvia the highest rate of unemployment growth in the EU. Early 2009 estimates predicted that the economy would contract by around 12% in 2009, but even those gloomy forecasts turned out to be too optimistic as the economy contracted by nearly 18% in the fourth quarter of 2009, showing little signs of recovery.

However, by 2010 commentators noted signs of stabilisation in the Latvian economy. Rating agency Standard & Poor's raised its outlook on Latvia's debt from negative to stable. Latvia's current account, which had been in deficit by 27% in late 2006 was in surplus in February 2010. Kenneth Orchard, senior analyst at Moody's investors service argued that:

"The strengthening regional economy is supporting Latvian production and exports, while the sharp swing in the current account balance suggests that the country’s ‘internal devaluation’ is working."

In June 2012 International Monetary Fund Managing Director Christine Lagarde lauded Latvia's accomplishments in bringing order to the country's economy, and emphasized Latvia must complete three more tasks - strive to join the eurozone, promote economic competitiveness, reduce social inequality. She concluded that by implementing its international loan program, Latvia has proven that it can be powerful and disciplined.

== See also ==
- Economy of Latvia
- Baltic states housing bubble
- 2008 financial crisis
- Great Recession in Russia
- 2008–2009 Ukrainian financial crisis
- 2008–2011 Icelandic financial crisis
- List of banks acquired or bankrupted during the Great Recession
- Internal devaluation
