= Code Parish =

Parish of Latvia

- parish of Latvia
- Coat of arms

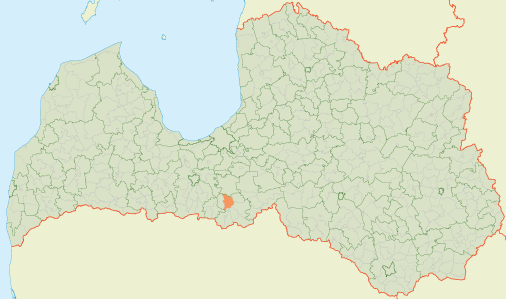
- 56°28′11″N 24°12′28″E
- Country: Latvia

Area
  - Total: 93.87 km^{2} (36.24 sq mi)
  - Land: 91.61 km^{2} (35.37 sq mi)
  - Water: 2.26 km^{2} (0.87 sq mi)

Population (1 January 2026)
  - Total: 1,434
  - Density: 15.65/km^{2} (40.54/sq mi)

Code Parish (/ˈtsuo͡dɛ/, Latvian: Codes pagasts) is an administrative unit of Bauska Municipality in the Semigallia region of Latvia.

== Villages and settlements of Code Parish ==
- Ciņi
- Code (administrative center)
- Dāliņi
- Elektriķi
- Guntas
- Ilziņi
- Jauncode
- Lodēni
- Rudzukrogs
- Strēļi

== Gallery ==
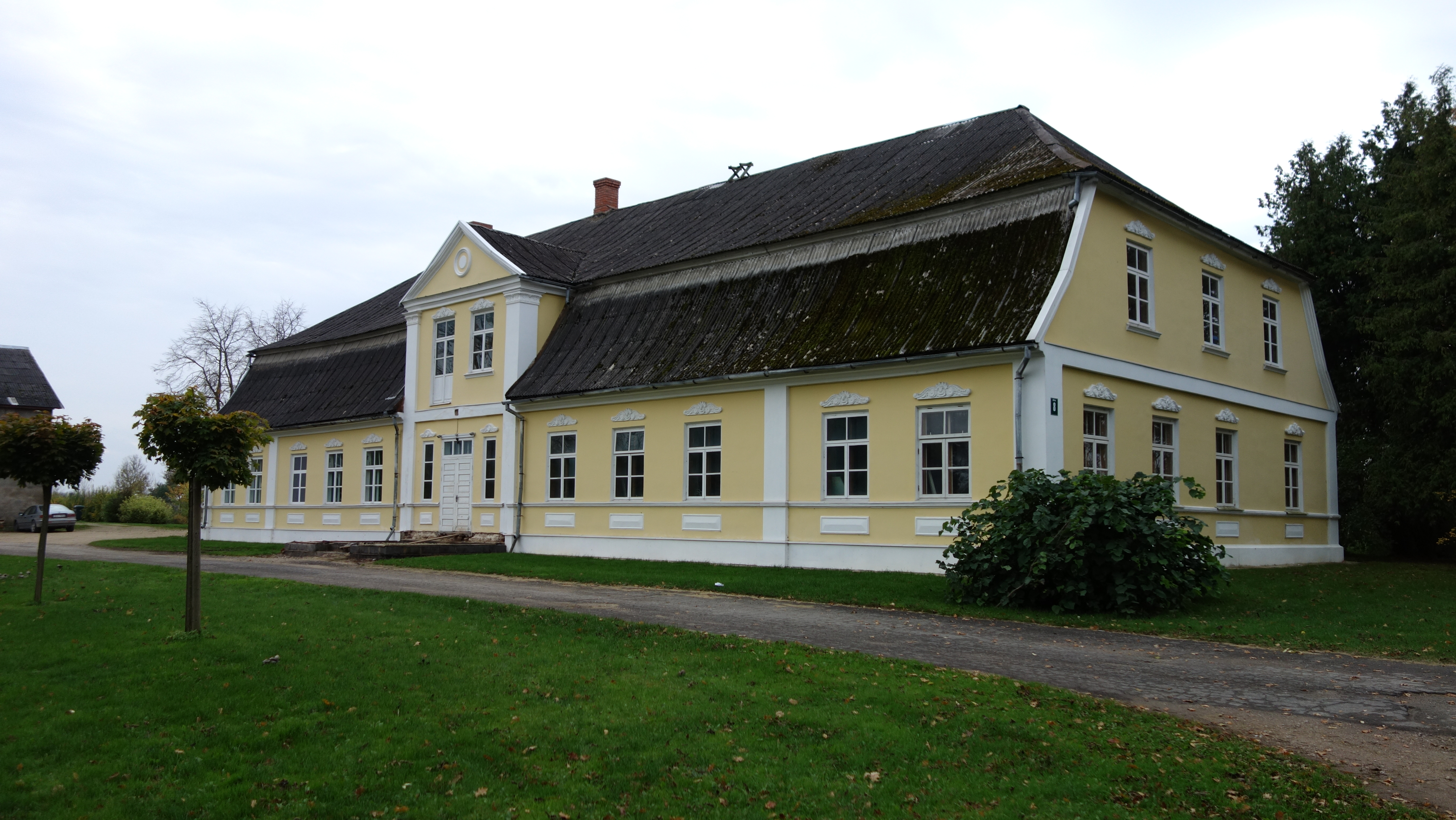
Code Manor

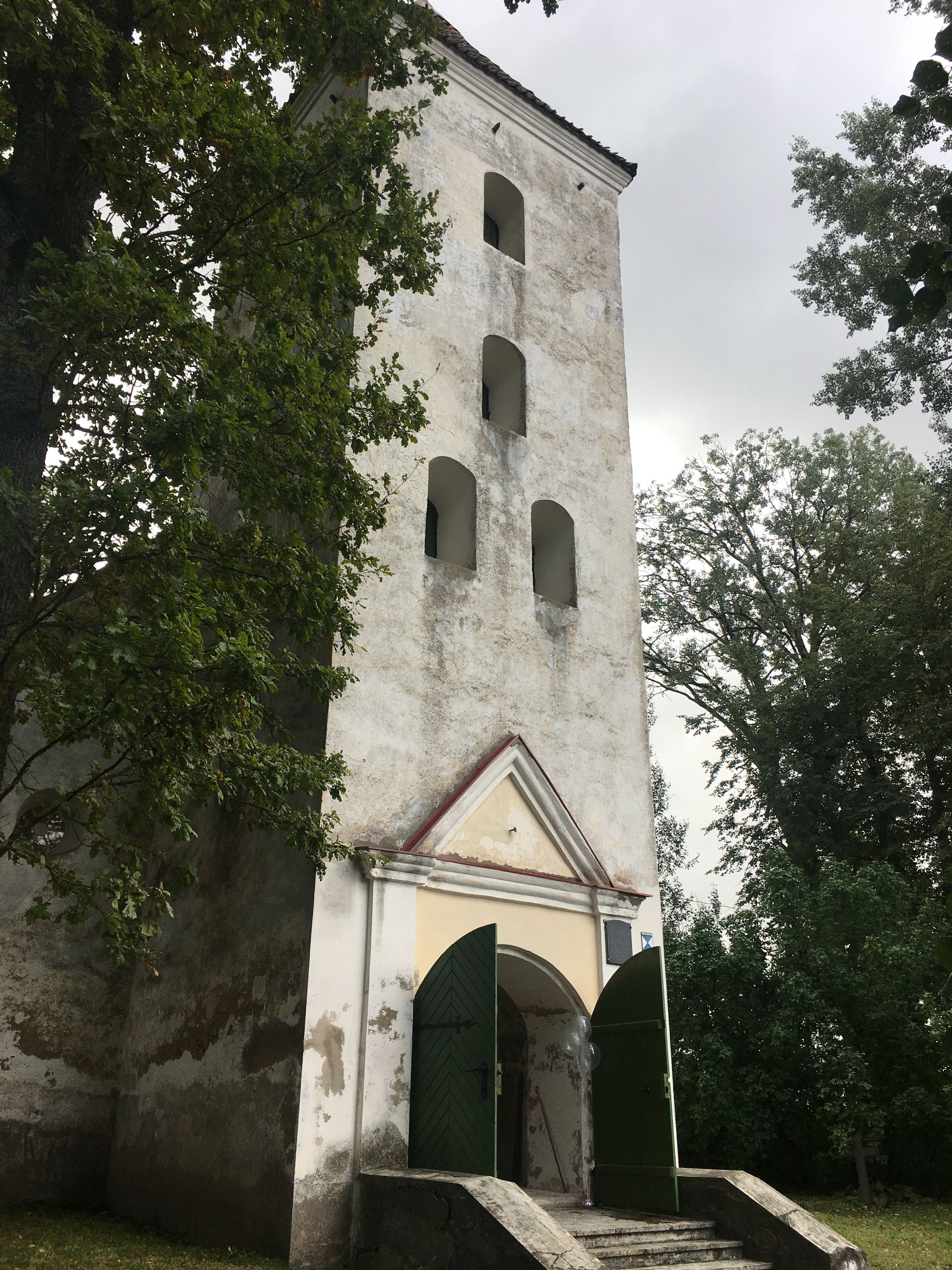
Code Lutheran Church

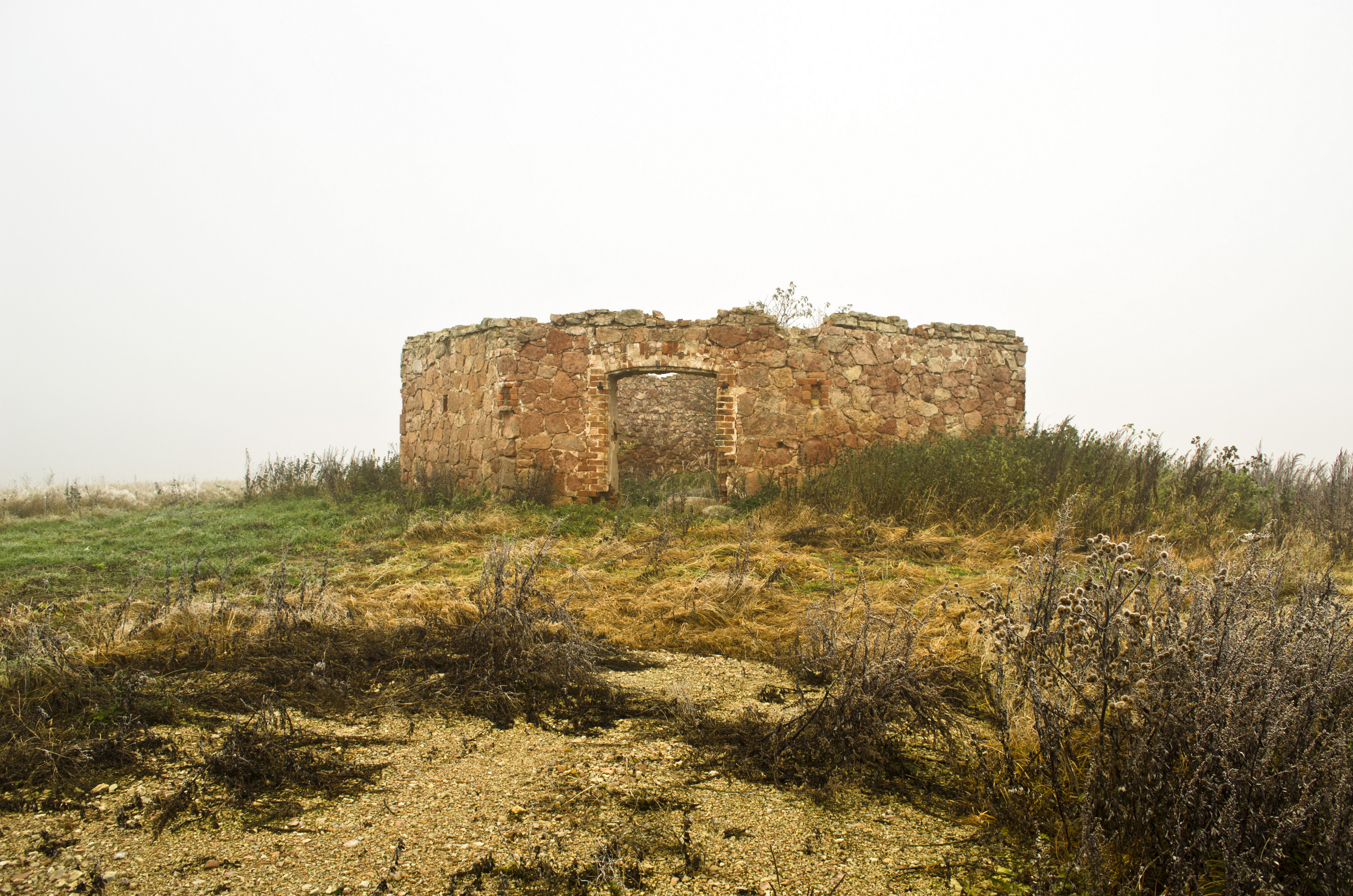
Old windmill ruins

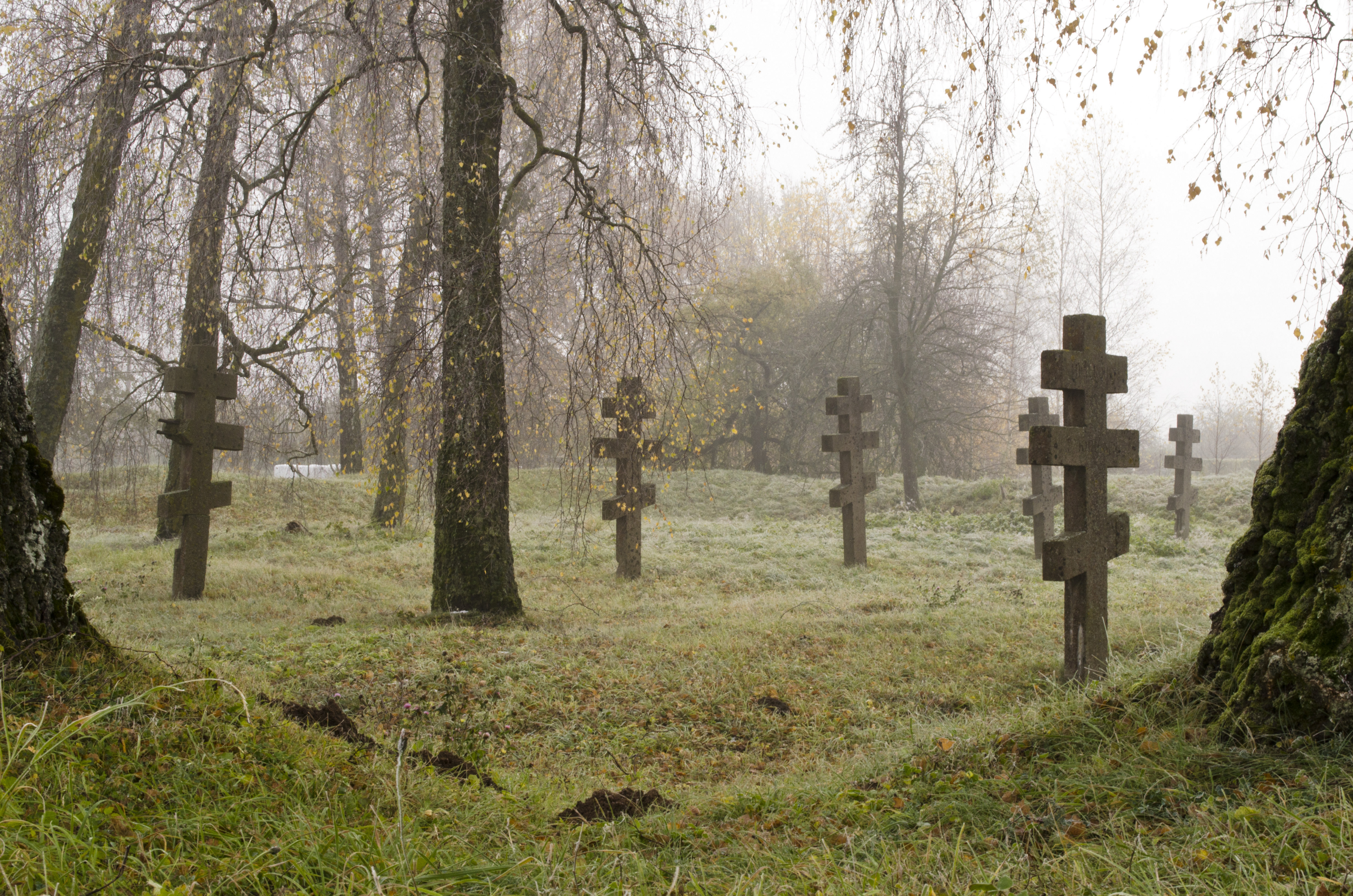
Cemetery for WWI soldiers

== Notable people ==
- Atis Slakteris
