= Atis Slakteris =

Latvian politician

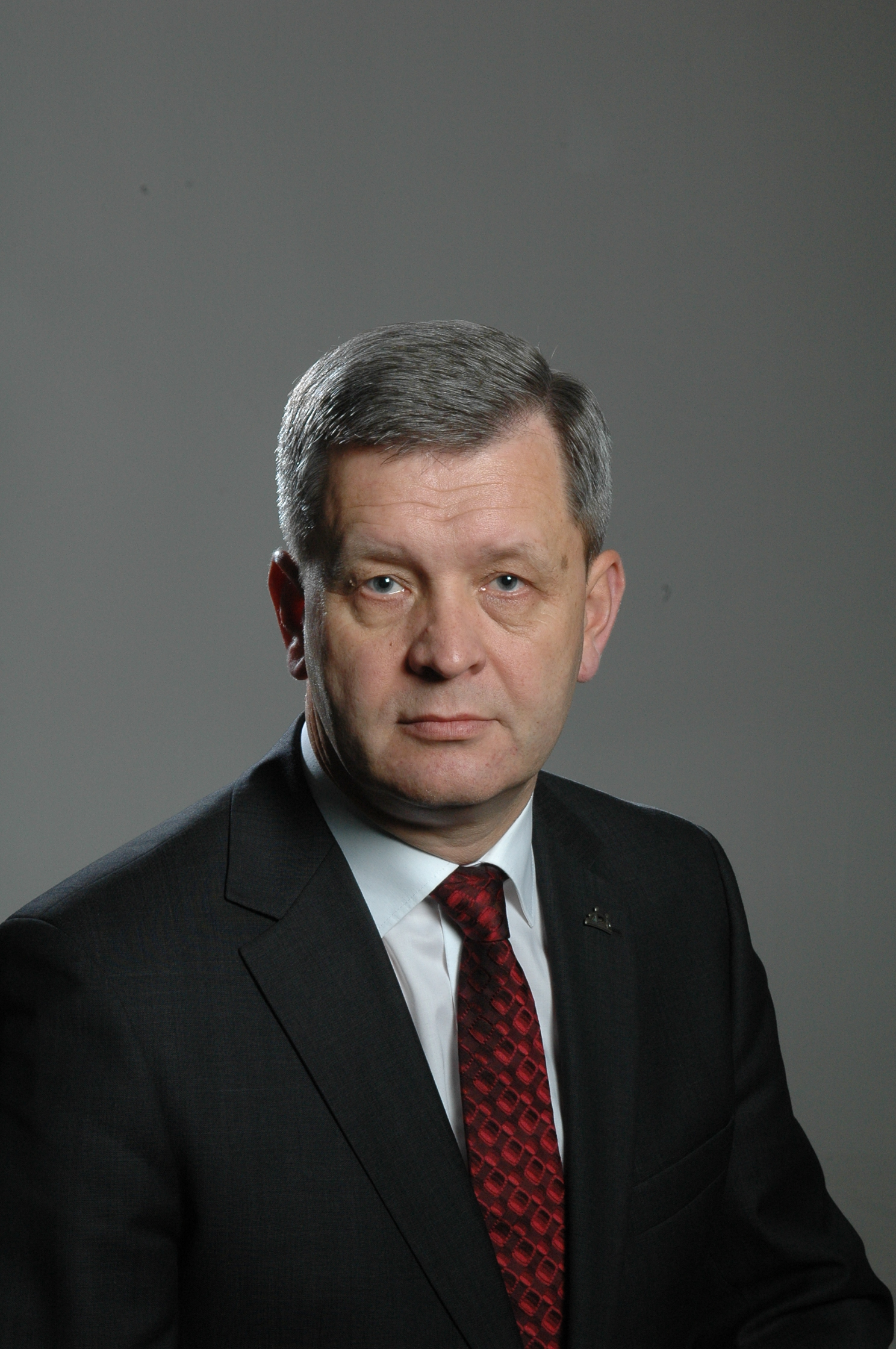

Minister of Finance
- In office 20 December 2007 – 12 March 2009
- Prime Minister: Ivars Godmanis
- Preceded by: Oskars Spurdziņš
- Succeeded by: Einars Repše

Minister of Defence
- In office 8 April 2006 – 20 December 2007
- Prime Minister: Aigars Kalvītis
- Preceded by: Linda Mūrniece
- Succeeded by: Vinets Veldre
- In office 9 March 2004 – 2 December 2004
- Prime Minister: Indulis Emsis
- Preceded by: Ģirts Valdis Kristovskis
- Succeeded by: Einars Repše

Minister of Agriculture
- In office 5 May 2000 – 7 November 2002
- Prime Minister: Andris Bērziņš
- Preceded by: Aigars Kalvītis
- Succeeded by: Mārtiņš Roze

Personal details
- Born: 21 November 1956 (age 69) Code parish, Latvian SSR (Now Bauska Municipality)
- Party: People's party
- Education: Latvian University of Agriculture

Atis Slakteris (born 21 November 1956, Code parish) is a former Minister of Defence of Latvia, and Minister of Finance from December 2007 to March 2009.

== Controversy ==
In late 2008, Slakteris gave an interview with Bloomberg about Latvia's economic crisis, during which he answered a question regarding the causes of Latvia having come to borrow money from the International Monetary Fund as "nothing special". The phrases "nasing spešal" (mocking Slakteris' poor English and heavy accent during the interview), "we will be taupīgi (Latvian for "frugal")" and "my answer will be, but I will not say" became popular memes in Latvia. Slakteris admitted that his English language skills were not perfect, but said that the fragments with the phrases shown on TV3 had been taken out of context and believed the controversy was politically engaged.
