= Gundars Bērziņš =

Latvian politician (1959–2023)

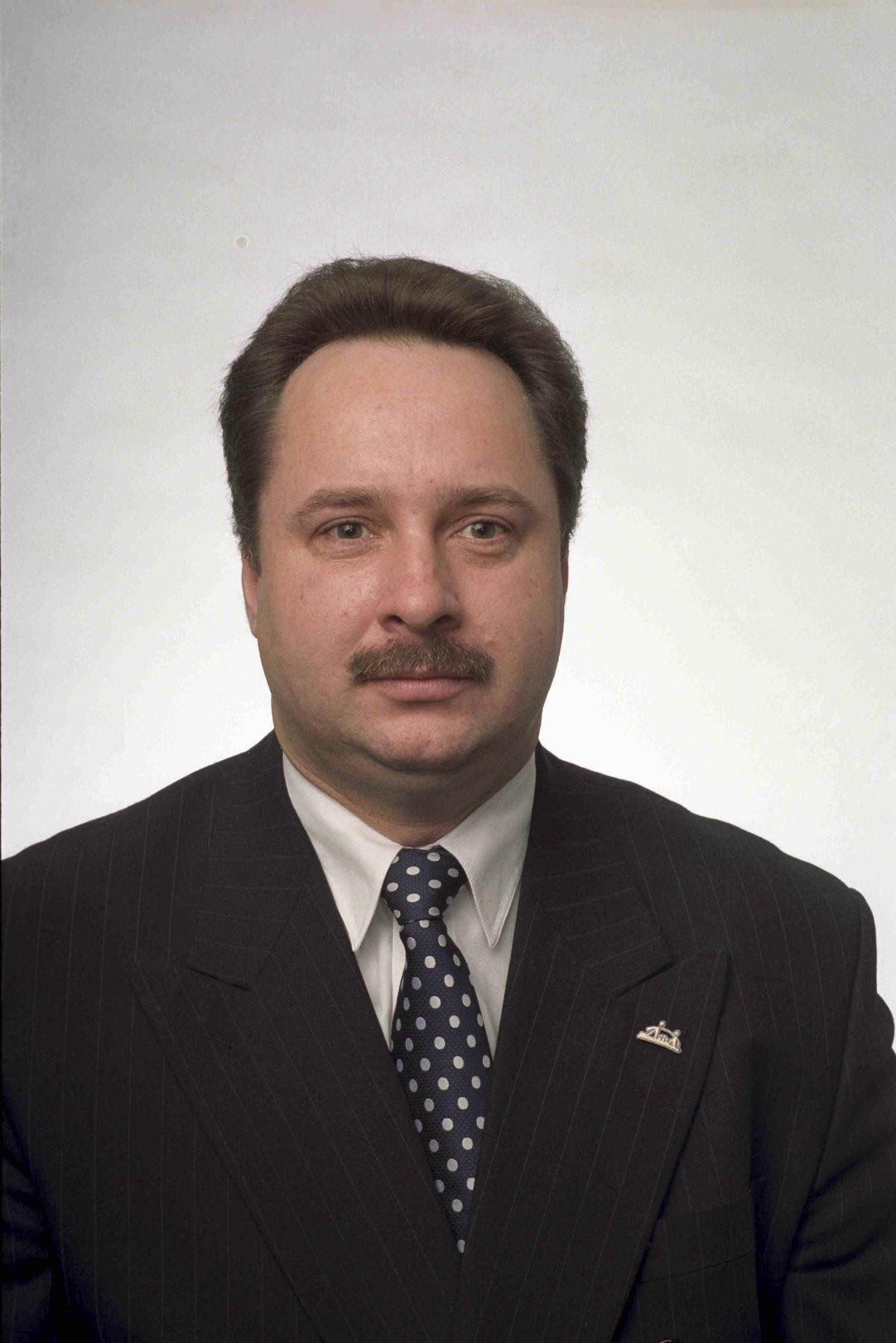

Minister of Healthcare
- In office December 2, 2004 – January 7, 2007
- President: Vaira Vīķe-Freiberga
- Prime Minister: Aigars Kalvītis

Minister of Finance
- In office May 5, 2000 – November 7, 2002
- President: Vaira Vīķe-Freiberga
- Prime Minister: Andris Bērziņš
- Succeeded by: Valdis Dombrovskis

Personal details
- Born: September 26, 1959 Latvian SSR, Soviet Union
- Died: January 8, 2023 (aged 63)
- Party: People's Party
- Education: Riga Technical University

Gundars Bērziņš (26 September 1959 – 8 January 2023) was a Latvian accountant and politician and a Deputy of the Saeima since 1993. He was a member of the People's Party. He served as the Minister of Finance of Latvia from 2000 to 2002 and Minister of Healthcare from 2004 to 2007.

Born in 1959 in Antūži (now Variešu parish), Krustpils district, in the family of a farmer. In 1983 graduated from the Faculty of Mechanics and Mechanical Engineering of Riga Polytechnic Institute.

He was the owner of the farm "Delles" in Jēkabpils district, and in 2009 was reported to be managing 665 hectares of land (15 properties in total, mostly agricultural land), making him one of the 100 largest landowners in Latvia at that time.

Bērziņš died on 8 January 2023, at the age of 63.
