= Vietalva Parish =

Parish of Latvia

- parish of Latvia
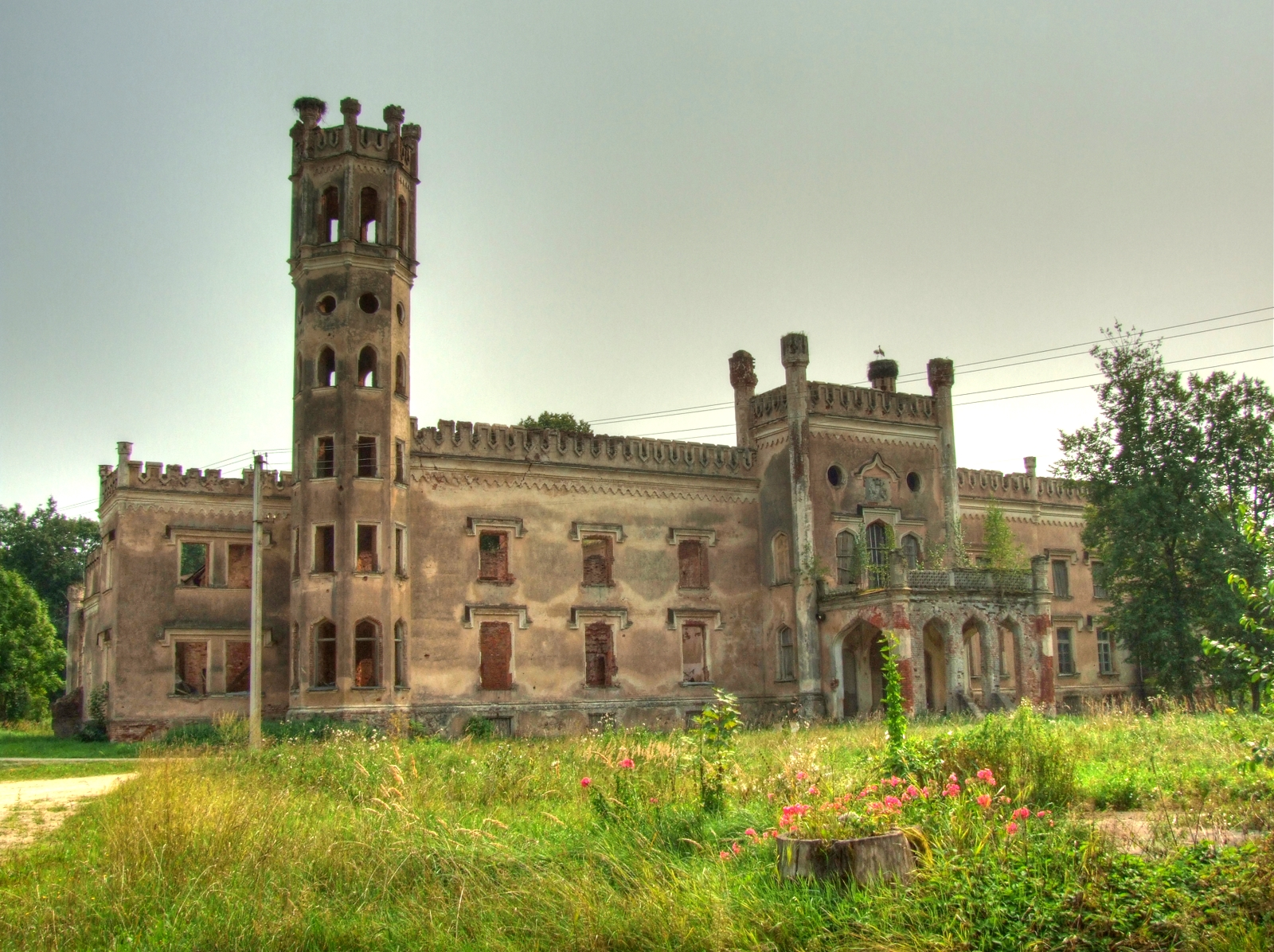

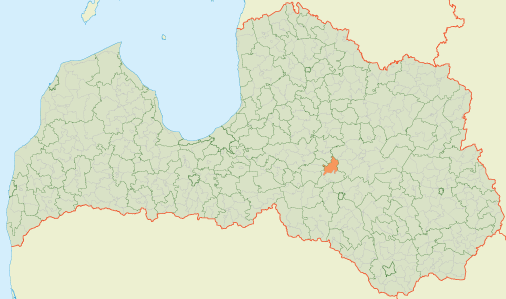
- 56°44′15″N 25°46′05″E
- Country: Latvia

Area
  - Total: 130.41 km^{2} (50.35 sq mi)
  - Land: 128.38 km^{2} (49.57 sq mi)
  - Water: 2.03 km^{2} (0.78 sq mi)

Population (1 January 2024)
  - Total: 620
  - Density: 4.8/km^{2} (12/sq mi)

Vietalva Parish (Latvian: Vietalvas pagasts) is an administrative unit of Aizkraukle Municipality in the Vidzeme region of Latvia.

== Towns, villages and settlements ==
- Alūnēni
- Benckalni
- Bites
- Jaunāmuiža
- Kaivēni
- Odziena
- Vietalva
