= German-Baltic Reform Party =

Latvian political party

The German-Baltic Reform Party (German: Deutsch-Baltische Reformpartei) was a Baltic German political party in Latvia during the inter-war period. It contested elections as part of the Committee of the German Baltic Parties alliance. The party was led by Edwin Magnus.

== History ==
The party was formed on 25 January 1920 by moderate rightwing-liberal sectors in the German minority. It was dissolved on 15 May 1934 following the self-coup by Kārlis Ulmanis.

== Members of the Saeima ==
Body	Years	Member	Notes
Constituent Assembly	1920–1922	Edwin Magnus	
First Saiema	1922–1925	Manfred von Vegesack	
Second Saeima	1925–1928	–	
Third Saeima	1928–1931	Lothar Schoeler	
Fourth Saeima	1931–1934	Lothar Schoeler	Alliance leader from 19 October 1933
