= Oskars Kastēns =

Latvian journalist and politician (born 1971)

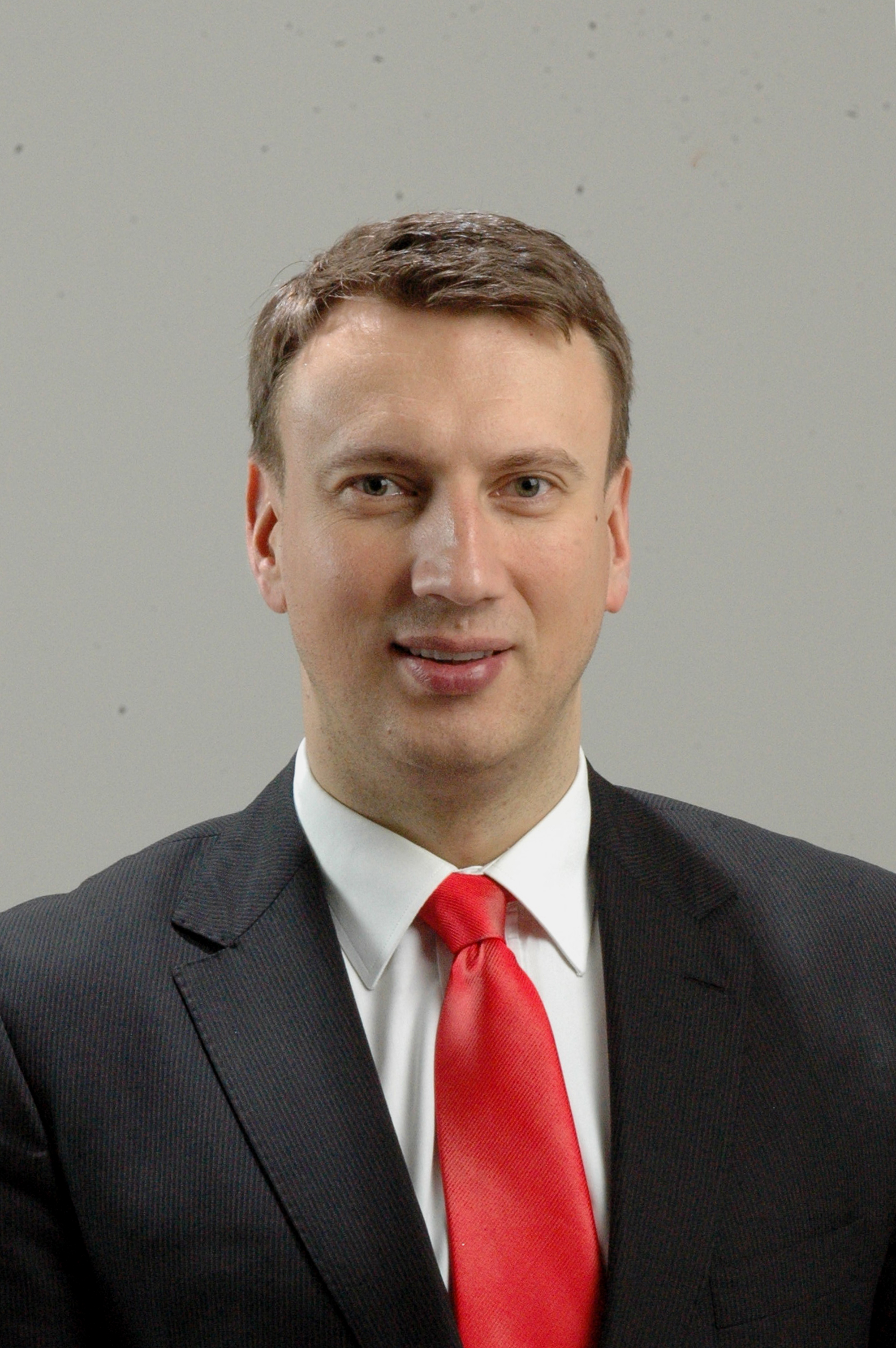

Deputy of the Saeima
- In office 2002-2010

Personal details
- Born: 19 July 1971 (age 55) Rīga, Latvian SSR
- Party: LPP/LC
- Education: University of Latvia
- Profession: Journalist

Oskars Kastēns (born July 19, 1971) is a Latvian journalist and a politician. He is a member of the LPP/LC and a deputy of the 9th Saeima (Latvian Parliament). He is the former Minister for Special Assignments for Society Integration Affairs.

Kastēns is also a member of the board of Global Panel America (Global Panel Foundation), a non-governmental organization.
