= Ainars Baštiks =

Latvian politician and Baptist priest

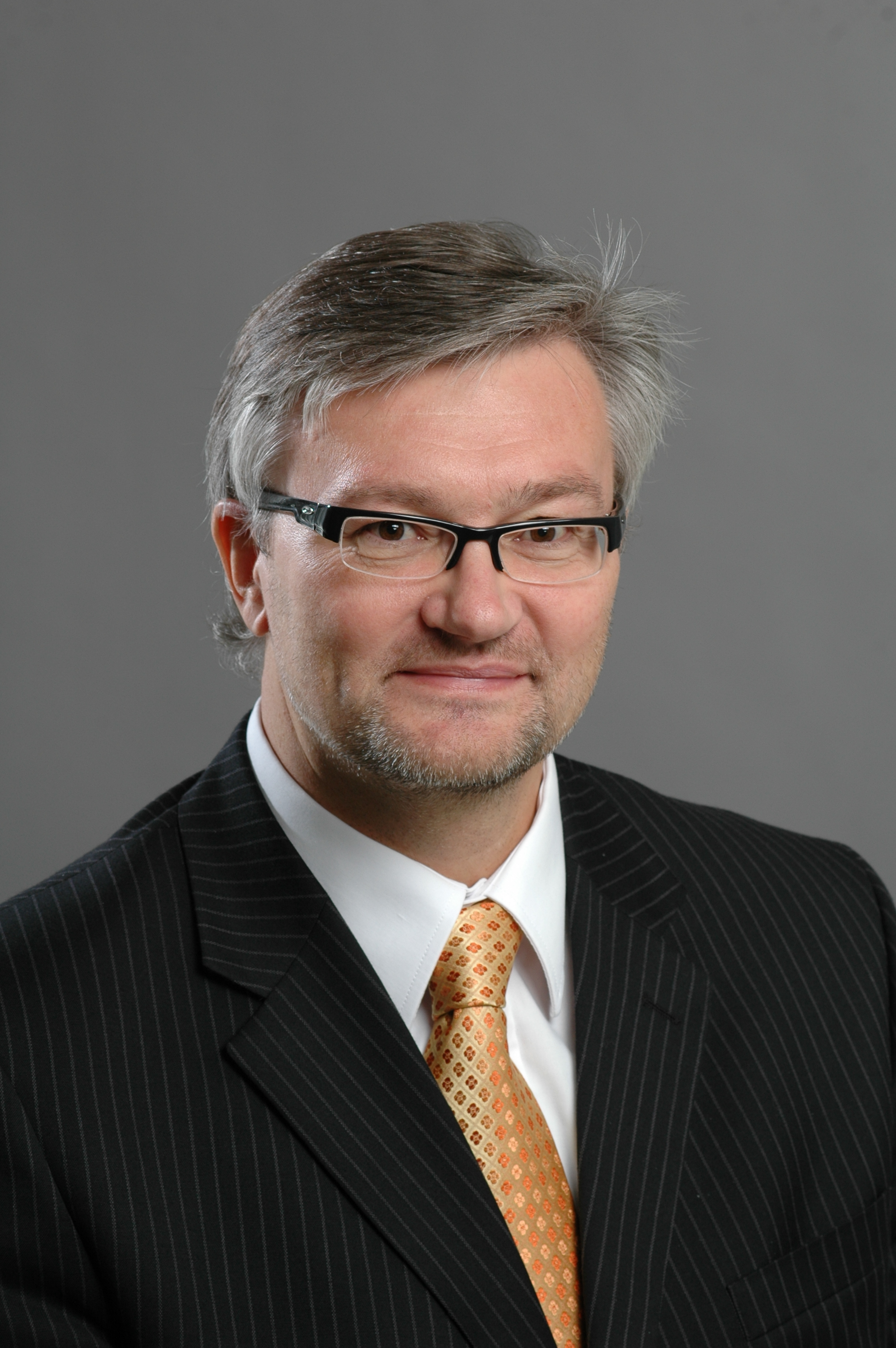
Ainars Baštiks

Ainars Baštiks (born October 26, 1958, Liepāja) is a Latvian politician and a Baptist pastor. He is a member of the LPP/LC party.

== Early life ==
Baštiks served in the Soviet Army, attended underground Baptist worship services, and refused to join the Komsomol.

== Politics ==
When the Latvia's First Party (LPP) and the Latvian Way (LC) merged in 2007, Baštiks served as the family affairs minister. In 2026 he was nominated to the position of Welfare Minister.
