= Edgars Zalāns =

Latvian politician and architect

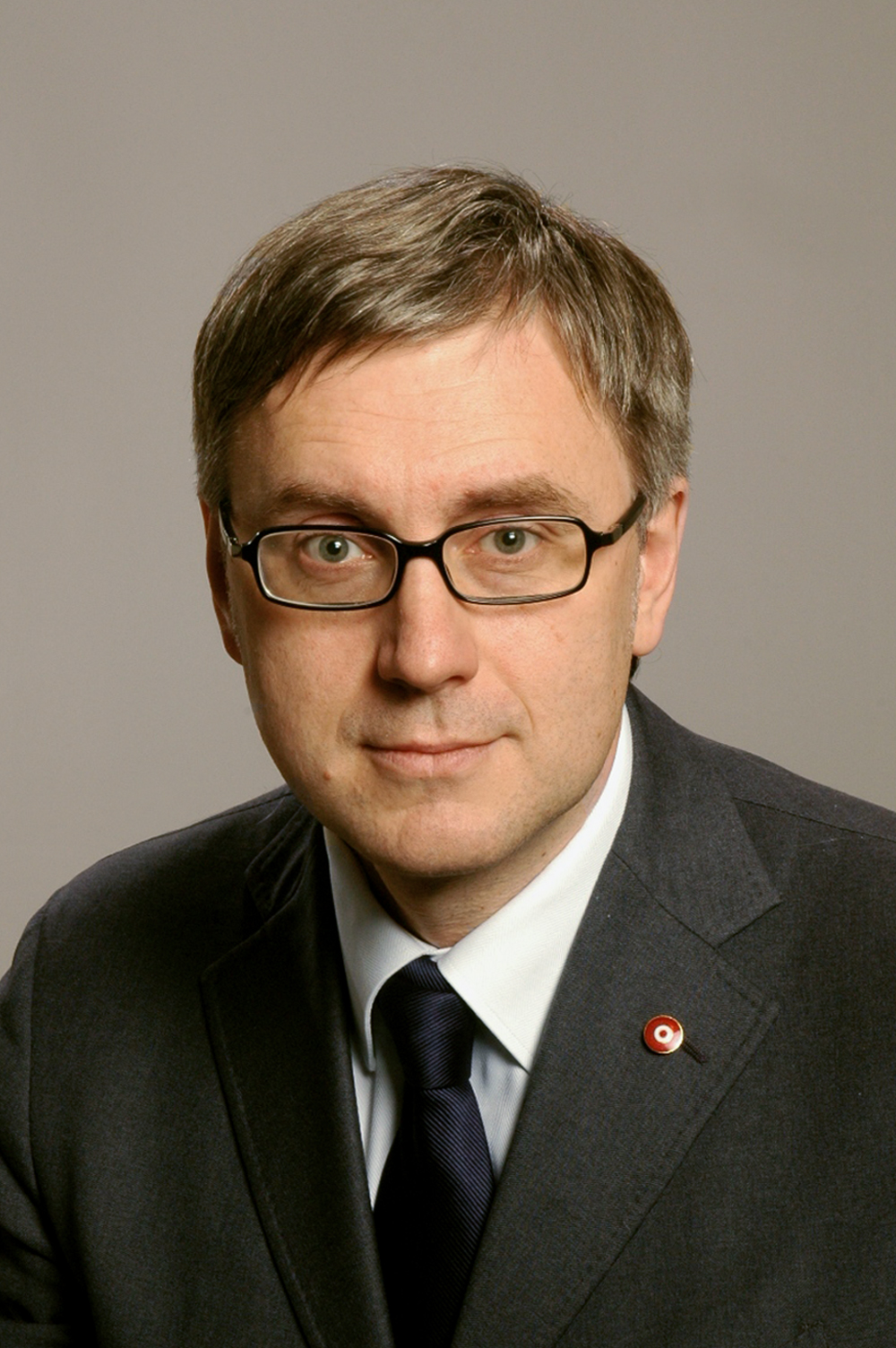
- Born: 3 September 1967 (age 58); Kuldīga, Latvian SSR
- Education: Riga Technical University
- Occupation: Architect
- Spouse: Diāna Zalāne

Edgars Zalāns (born 3 September 1967) is a Latvian politician and architect. He was Minister of Regional Development and Local Governments of Latvia from 8 November 2007 to 17 March 2010.

== Biography ==
Zalāns graduated from Riga Technical University in 1992, obtaining a diploma of architecture followed by a post-graduate certificate in Planning from the University of Queensland in 1994. From 1992 until 1994 he was a key architect in the Kuldīga district. For several years he worked as the district council and Kuldīga City Hall. During the period from 2001 until 2007 he was a member of the Kuldīga City Council. In 2007 Edgars Zalāns became the Minister of Regional Development, a post he held until 2010.
