= Aigars Kalvītis =

Latvian politician and hockey organizer

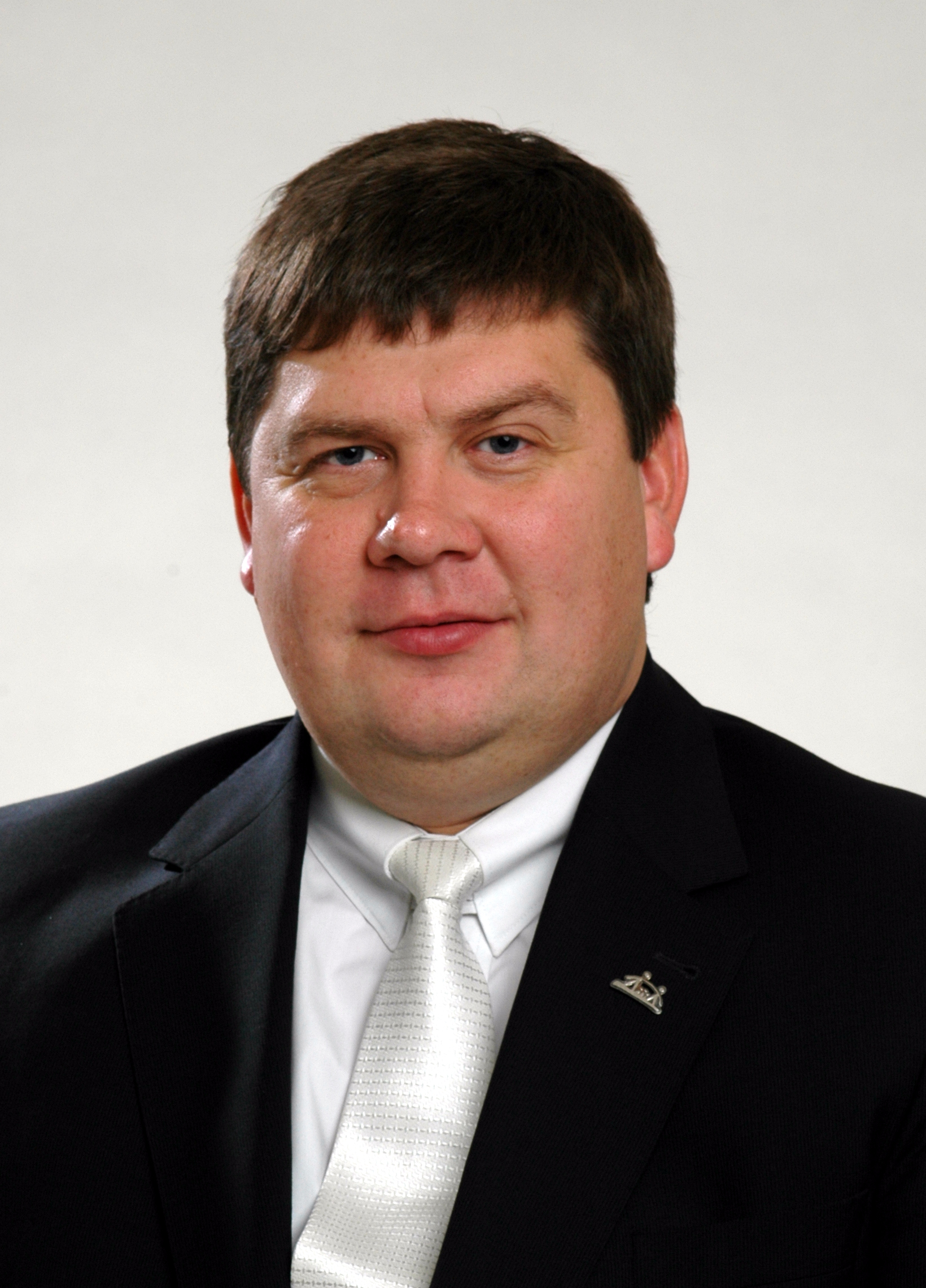
- Kalvītis in 2004

19th Prime Minister of Latvia
- In office 2 December 2004 – 20 December 2007
- President: Vaira Vike-Freiberga; Valdis Zatlers
- Preceded by: Indulis Emsis
- Succeeded by: Ivars Godmanis

Personal details
- Born: 27 June 1966 (age 60) Riga, Latvian Soviet Socialist Republic
- Party: People's Party (1997–2011)
- Spouse: Kristīne Kalvīte
- Occupation: Businessman, politician

Aigars Kalvītis (born 27 June 1966) is a Latvian businessman and a former politician who was the Prime Minister of Latvia from 2004 to 2007. Currently he is the president of Latvian Ice Hockey Federation and the Chairman of the Board of Latvian natural gas company Latvijas Gāze. He is the Chairman of the Council of Latvian telecommunications company Tet.

== Education ==
In 1984 Kalvītis graduated from Riga Secondary School No. 41. In 1992, he graduated from the Latvian University of Agriculture with a bachelor's degree in economics and in 1995 he graduated with a magister degree in economics. In the same year he studied in the University of Wisconsin.

== Political career ==
=== Political activities up to 2004 ===
Kalvītis was one of the founders of People's Party of Latvia in 1997 and was first elected to Saeima, the Latvian parliament, in 1998. He served as the minister of agriculture from 1999 to 2000 and the minister of economics from 2000 to 2002. Kalvītis was reelected to Saeima and became the leader of the parliamentary faction of the People's Party in 2002.

=== Prime minister ===
On 2 December 2004, he became the Prime Minister of Latvia. He was the prime minister of Latvia until his resignation on 5 December 2007.

=== Kalvītis government ===
Kalvītis at first led a coalition government consisting of his own People's Party, the New Era Party, the Union of Greens and Farmers and the Latvia's First Party. In April 2006, the New Era Party left the government and Kalvītis led a minority coalition government consisting of the other three parties.

His governing coalition retained power in the 7 October 2006 parliamentary election, winning a slight majority of seats and becoming the first government since Latvian independence in 1991 to be re-elected. It consisted of the People's Party, Union of Greens and Farmers, the Latvia First/Latvian Way Party, and For Fatherland and Freedom/LNNK. For Fatherland and Freedom/LNNK was added after the 2006 elections, and strengthened the coalition's majority to 59 of the 100 seats. Meanwhile, the People's Party became the largest party in Parliament. Kalvītis became its chairman.

=== Retirement from politics ===
On 7 November 2007, Kalvītis announced that he would step down as prime minister on 5 December, after encountering widespread opposition to his dismissal of the head of the anti-corruption bureau, Aleksejs Loskutovs, in the previous month. He accordingly met with President Valdis Zatlers on 5 December and announced his resignation, along with that of his government. According to Kalvītis, speaking on television on the same day, this was necessary to "cool down hot heads". Kalvītis remained in office in a caretaker capacity until the appointment of his successor Ivars Godmanis. He decided to leave politics altogether on 1 April 2009, by putting down his member of Saeima mandate.

== Business career ==
From 1992 to 1998, he was a manager and Chairman of the Board of various agriculture related businesses. And after his political career he has been Chairman of the Council of various well-known companies like Tet (2009), Latvijas Balzams (2009–2015), and Chairman of the Board of enterprises like Hockey Club Dinamo Riga (2010–2015), the operator of Latvian LNG infrastructure Conexus Baltic Grid (2017) and Latvijas Gāze (2015). He became the president of the Latvian Ice Hockey Federation in October 2016, to succeed Kirovs Lipmans.

== Personal life ==
His wife is Kristīne Kalvīte. He has three sons Kārlis, Roberts and Rūdolfs.

== See also ==
- First Kalvītis cabinet
- Second Kalvītis cabinet

Political offices
Preceded by Indulis Emsis	Prime Minister of Latvia; 2004–2007	Succeeded by Ivars Godmanis
