= People's Party (Latvia) =

Latvian political party

People's Party Tautas partija
- Leader: Andris Šķēle
- Founded: 1998
- Dissolved: 2011
- Headquarters: Riga
- Ideology: Conservatism; National conservatism Economic liberalism
- Political position: Centre-right
- National affiliation: For a Good Latvia
- European affiliation: European People's Party
- European Parliament group: European People's Party (2004–2009)
- Colours: Orange

The People's Party (Latvian: Tautas partija, TP) was a conservative political party in Latvia. The People's Party was the leader of three governments and a member of another four.

== History ==
Tautas partija was founded in 1998 by Andris Šķēle, a businessman and former prime minister, who was the chairman of the party until 2002. Because of Šķēle's powerful personality, many voters identified the party with its leader during this period. In 2002, Šķēle exited politics and Atis Slakteris became the chairman of Tautas partija. At the October 2002 elections the party became the third largest in the Saeima (parliament), winning 16.7% of the vote and 20 seats. In 2004, People's Party member Aigars Kalvītis became prime minister.

At the legislative elections, on 7 October 2006, the party won 19.49% of the popular vote and 23 out of 100 seats in the Saeima, becoming the largest party in parliament and maintaining its status as leader of the coalition government, with Kalvītis as prime minister. The post of the Prime Minister was lost in 2007, but the party retained its place in the coalition under Ivars Godmanis of the Latvian Way party, and then until spring of 2010 under Valdis Dombrovskis of the New Era Party. However at the 2010 elections, the first after the Latvian economic crisis, the party lost most of its support, winning just 4 seats in the elections.

Tautas partija was a member of the European People's Party (EPP).

On July 9, 2011, 248 out of 308 party congress delegates voted to disband the People's Party. According to some political analysts, it was done in order to avoid repaying a Ls1.03 million campaign donation it received and spent illegally in 2006, but party chairman Andris Šķēle denied that. On September 22, 2011, the Senate of the Supreme Court of Latvia refused People’s Party appeal against the Corruption Prevention and Combating Bureau's decision to make it pay back 1.03 million lats, however on December 16, 2011, the People's Party was declared insolvent by the Riga City Central District Court.

== Election results ==
=== Legislative elections ===
Election	Performance					Rank
Election	Votes	%	Seats	+/–		Rank
2006	177481	19.49%	23 / 100	▲3	▲1st	
