= Ivars Godmanis =

Latvian politician (born 1951)

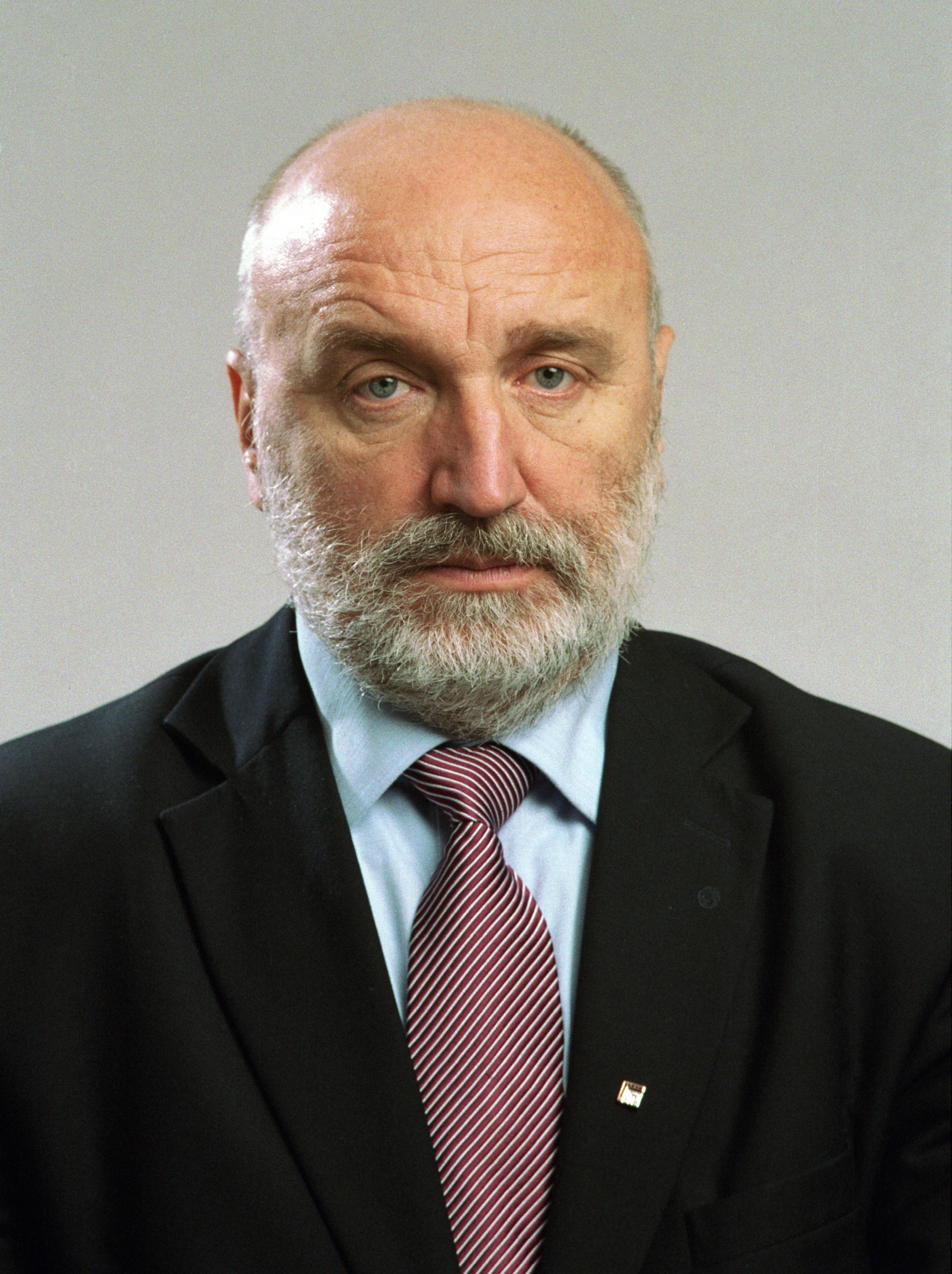
- Official portrait, 2008

10th Prime Minister of Latvia
- In office 20 December 2007 – 12 March 2009
- President: Valdis Zatlers
- Preceded by: Aigars Kalvītis
- Succeeded by: Valdis Dombrovskis
- In office 7 May 1990^{[nb]} – 3 August 1993
- President: Anatolijs Gorbunovs (Acting); Guntis Ulmanis
- Preceded by: Vilnis Edvīns Bresis
- Succeeded by: Valdis Birkavs

Personal details
- Born: 27 November 1951 (age 74) Riga, then part of Latvian SSR, Soviet Union
- Party: Popular Front of Latvia (1988–1993); Latvian Way (1997–2007); Latvia's First Party/Latvian Way (2007–2011)
- Education: University of Latvia
- n.b. As Chairman of the Council of Ministers

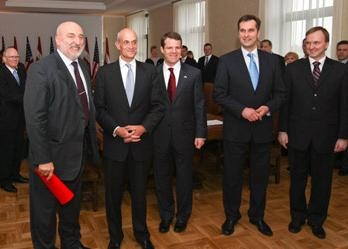
Ivars Godmanis (on left) at meeting of Latvia government and deployers of US embassy in Riga

Ivars Godmanis (born 27 November 1951) is a Latvian politician who served as the Prime Minister of Latvia from 1990 to 1993 and again from 2007 to 2009. He was the first prime minister of Latvia after the country restored its independence from the Soviet Union.

== Political career ==
Godmanis served as prime minister from 1990 to 1993, focusing primarily on Latvia's difficult economic transition from planned to market economy. In 1995 Godmanis was awarded the Order of the Three Stars. He later served as the Minister of Finance from 1998 to 1999. He was originally associated with the Latvian Popular Front, but after the Front ceased to exist he moved to the Latvian Way party. In November 2006, following elections in which the Latvian Way in coalition with Latvia's First Party returned to Parliament, Godmanis became the Minister of the Interior.

On 14 December 2007, Godmanis was nominated as prime minister by President Valdis Zatlers. He was approved by the parliament on 20 December, with 54 votes in favor and 43 in opposition.

On 18 June 2008 he suffered head injuries in a car accident when his official limousine was involved in a collision with a small bus.

On 19 September 2008 he replaced Roger Taylor on drums during Queen + Paul Rodgers' performance of "All Right Now" at a concert in Riga.

Economic problems and corruption charges caused the popularity of Godmanis's government to plummet. In January 2009, anti-government protests turned into the worst riots the country has seen since re-gaining independence in 1991. On 20 February 2009, Godmanis resigned as prime minister along with the rest of his government over concerns about handling the economic crisis. On 26 February 2009, President Valdis Zatlers appointed former finance minister Valdis Dombrovskis as the new prime minister; he was sworn in on 12 March 2009.

In autumn 2013 Godmanis expressed his wish to join the Latvian Farmers' Union to run on its list in next year's European Parliament elections, but the LZS board rejected the former head of government's wish. Godmanis joined the party “United for Latvia” led by Ainārs Šlesers, and unsuccessfully ran on its list of 12 candidates. On 5 June 2018, he was succeeded by Ivars Kalviņš, and Godmanis remained on the company's Supervisory Board until 4 September.

He was awarded the Order of the Three Stars, Second Class, and the 1991 Barricades Participant Commemorative Badge.

== See also ==
- First Godmanis cabinet
- Second Godmanis cabinet

Political offices
Preceded by Vilnis-Edvīns Bresis as Chairman of the Council of Ministers of Latvian SSR	Prime Minister of Latvia; 1990 – 1993	Succeeded by Valdis Birkavs
Preceded by Aigars Kalvītis	Prime Minister of Latvia; 2007 – 2009	Succeeded by Valdis Dombrovskis
