= Deputy Prime Minister of Latvia =

Optional office in the Cabinet of Latvia

The deputy prime minister of Latvia (Latvian: Ministru prezidenta biedrs) is an optional member of the Cabinet of Latvia. Latvian law permits the Cabinet to include one or several deputy prime ministers, who may also serve as ministers responsible for particular portfolios.

The office has not been included in every Latvian cabinet. Its use has varied from governments with several simultaneous deputy prime ministers in the 1990s to extended periods in which no person was appointed. As of August 2026, the Kulbergs cabinet, formed on 28 May 2026, does not include a deputy prime minister.

== Legal basis ==
Under the Cabinet Structure Law, the Cabinet may include ministers who do not head ministries, including one or several deputy prime ministers. A deputy prime minister may simultaneously hold a ministerial portfolio or serve as a minister for special assignments. The Cabinet determines the deputy prime minister's field of competence, while tasks may be assigned by the Cabinet or by the prime minister.

When the prime minister is absent, a deputy prime minister substitutes for the prime minister unless another arrangement has been made. Where several deputy prime ministers have been appointed, or where the Cabinet has none, the prime minister determines the order in which another member of the Cabinet performs those duties.

The restored parliamentary system initially operated under the renewed 1925 law on the structure of the Cabinet. The 1993 legislation allowed the Cabinet to include a deputy prime minister who did not head a ministry and also permitted ministers with portfolios to be designated as deputy prime ministers.

== Development ==
A deputy-prime-ministerial office was used during the authoritarian government established after the 1934 Latvian coup d'état. Marģers Skujenieks served as deputy prime minister from May 1934 until his resignation in February 1938.

During the restoration of Latvian independence, the Council of Ministers formed in 1990 included a chairman and two deputy chairmen. Those deputy-chairman positions were abolished during a government reorganisation in 1991. Following the full restoration of the Constitution of Latvia and the parliamentary Cabinet system in 1993, the office of deputy prime minister was again used in the government led by Valdis Birkavs.

Deputy prime ministers were particularly common in the coalition cabinets of the 1990s. Three served in the Birkavs cabinet, while the first cabinet of Andris Šķēle included several ministers who simultaneously held the rank of deputy prime minister.

The office was subsequently used intermittently. Ainārs Šlesers held it in the governments of Einars Repše and Indulis Emsis; Artis Pabriks held it in the second government of Valdis Dombrovskis; and Arvils Ašeradens served as deputy prime minister in the Māris Kučinskis government.

The First Kariņš cabinet, formed in January 2019, had two deputy prime ministers: Defence Minister Artis Pabriks and Justice Minister Jānis Bordāns. Neither the second Kariņš cabinet nor the subsequent cabinets formed by Evika Siliņa and Andris Kulbergs included the office.

== Cabinets with deputy prime ministers since 1993 ==
The table lists cabinets in which at least one person was formally designated as deputy prime minister. Changes of portfolio within a cabinet are not treated as separate offices unless they changed the holder of the deputy-prime-ministerial designation.

Cabinet	Period	Deputy prime ministers	Sources
Birkavs cabinet	3 August 1993 – 19 September 1994	Māris Gailis, Ojārs Kehris, Egils Levits	
Gailis cabinet	19 September 1994 – 21 December 1995	Andris Piebalgs, Jānis Vaivads, Valdis Birkavs, later Andris Gūtmanis and Andris Bērziņš	
First Šķēle cabinet	21 December 1995 – 13 February 1997	Alberts Kauls, Māris Gailis, Ziedonis Čevers, Andrejs Krastiņš, Māris Grīnblats, later Roberts Dilba and Anatolijs Gorbunovs	
Second Šķēle cabinet	13 February 1997 – 7 August 1997	Juris Kaksītis, Anatolijs Gorbunovs	
Krasts cabinet	7 August 1997 – 26 November 1998	Juris Kaksītis, Anatolijs Gorbunovs	
Krištopans cabinet	26 November 1998 – 16 July 1999	Guntars Krasts, Anatolijs Gorbunovs	
Repše cabinet	7 November 2002 – 9 March 2004	Ainārs Šlesers until 26 January 2004	
Emsis cabinet	9 March 2004 – 2 December 2004	Ainārs Šlesers	
Second Dombrovskis cabinet	3 November 2010 – 25 October 2011	Artis Pabriks	
Kučinskis cabinet	11 February 2016 – 23 January 2019	Arvils Ašeradens	
First Kariņš cabinet	23 January 2019 – 14 December 2022	Artis Pabriks, Jānis Bordāns	

== See also ==
- Prime Minister of Latvia
- Cabinet of Latvia
- Politics of Latvia
