= Krasts cabinet =

Latvia's former government

The Krasts cabinet was the government of Latvia from 7 August 1997 to 26 November 1998. It was led by Prime Minister Guntars Krasts. It took office on 7 August 1997, after the resignation of Andris Šķēle. It was replaced by the Krištopans cabinet on 26 November 1998, after the October 1998 election.

Position	Name	Party	Dates
Prime Minister	Guntars Krasts	For Fatherland and Freedom/LNNK	7 August 1997 – 26 November 1998
Deputy Prime Minister	Juris Kaksītis	Democratic Party "Saimnieks"	7 August 1997 – 16 April 1998
Deputy Prime Minister	Anatolijs Gorbunovs	Latvian Way	7 August 1997 – 26 November 1998
Minister of Defence	Tālavs Jundzis	Christian People's Party	7 August 1997 – 27 October 1998
Minister of Defence	Guntars Krasts (interim)	For Fatherland and Freedom/LNNK	27 October 1998 – 26 November 1998
Minister of Foreign Affairs	Valdis Birkavs	Latvian Way	7 August 1997 – 26 November 1998
Minister for Economics	Atis Sausnītis	Democratic Party "Saimnieks"	7 August 1997 – 6 April 1998
Minister for Economics	Guntars Krasts (interim)	For Fatherland and Freedom/LNNK	6 April 1998 – 8 April 1998
Minister for Economics	Anatolijs Gorbunovs	Latvian Way	9 April 1998 – 4 May 1998
Minister for Economics	Laimonis Strujevičs	Latvian Farmers' Union	4 May 1998 – 26 November 1998
Minister for Finance	Roberts Zīle	For Fatherland and Freedom/LNNK	7 August 1997 – 26 November 1998
Minister for the Interior	Ziedonis Čevers	Democratic Party "Saimnieks"	7 August 1997 – 9 April 1998
Minister for the Interior	Tālavs Jundzis (interim)	Christian People's Party	9 April 1998 – 4 May 1998
Minister for the Interior	Andrejs Krastiņš	For Fatherland and Freedom/LNNK	4 May 1998 – 26 November 1998
Minister for Education and Science	Juris Celmiņš	Democratic Party "Saimnieks"	7 August 1997 – 16 April 1998
Minister for Education and Science	Vladimirs Makarovs (interim)	For Fatherland and Freedom/LNNK	17 April 1998 – 4 May 1998
Minister for Education and Science	Jānis Gaigals	Latvian Way	4 May 1998 – 26 November 1998
Minister for Culture	Ramona Umblija	Latvian Farmers' Union	7 August 1997 – 26 November 1998
Minister for Welfare	Vladimirs Makarovs	For Fatherland and Freedom/LNNK	7 August 1997 – 26 November 1998
Minister for Transport	Vilis Krištopans	Latvian Way	7 August 1997 – 26 November 1998
Minister for Justice	Dzintars Rasnačs	For Fatherland and Freedom/LNNK	7 August 1997 – 26 November 1998
Minister for Environmental Protection and Regional Development	Anatolijs Gorbunovs	Latvian Way	7 August 1997 – 26 November 1998
Minister for Agriculture	Andris Rāviņš	Latvian Farmers' Union	7 August 1997 – 26 November 1998
State Minister for State Revenues	Aija Poča	Latvian Way	7 August 1997 – 26 November 1998
State Minister for the Environment	Indulis Emsis	Latvian Green Party	7 August 1997 – 26 November 1998
State Minister for Municipal Affairs	Ēriks Zunda	Democratic Party "Saimnieks"	7 August 1997 – 19 April 1998
State Minister for Municipal Affairs	Jānis Bunkšs	Latvian Way	4 May 1998 – 26 November 1998
State Minister for Health	Viktors Jaksons	For Fatherland and Freedom/LNNK	7 August 1997 – 26 November 1998
