= Birkavs cabinet =

Government of Latvia, 1993–1994

The Birkavs cabinet was the government of Latvia from 3 August 1993 to 19 September 1994. It was led by Prime Minister Valdis Birkavs. It took office on 3 August 1993, after the July 1993 election. It was replaced by the Krištopans cabinet on 26 November 1998, after the October 1998 election.

Position	Name	Party	Dates
Prime Minister	Valdis Birkavs	Latvian Way	3 August 1993 - 19 September 1994
Deputy Prime Minister	Ojārs Kehris	Latvian Way	3 August 1993 - 19 September 1994
Deputy Prime Minister	Egils Levits	Latvian Way	3 August 1993 – 19 September 1994
Deputy Prime Minister	Māris Gailis	Latvian Way	3 August 1993 – 19 September 1994
Minister for Defence	Valdis Pavlovskis	Latvian Way	3 August 1993 – 19 September 1994
Minister for Foreign Affairs	Georgs Andrejevs	Latvian Way	3 August 1993 – 7 June 1994
Minister for Foreign Affairs	Valdis Birkavs (interim)	Latvian Way	7 June 1994 - 19 September 1994
Minister for the Economy	Ojārs Kehris	Latvian Way	3 August 1993 – 19 September 1994
Minister for Finance	Uldis Osis	Latvian Way	3 August 1993 – 19 September 1994
Minister for the Interior	Ģirts Valdis Kristovskis	Latvian Way	3 August 1993 – 19 September 1994
Minister for Education, Culture, and Science	Jānis Vaivads	Latvian Farmers' Union	3 August 1993 – 17 August 1994
Minister for Education and Science	Jānis Vaivads (interim)	Latvian Farmers' Union	17 August 1994 - 19 September 1994
Minister for Culture	Jānis Dripe (interim)	Latvian Way	17 August 1994 - 19 September 1994
Minister for Welfare	Jānis Ritenis	Latvian Way	3 August 1993 – 19 September 1994
Minister for Transport	Andris Gūtmanis	Latvian Way	3 August 1993 – 19 September 1994
Minister for Justice	Egils Levits	Latvian Way	3 August 1993 – 19 September 1994
Minister for National Reform	Māris Gailis	Latvian Way	3 August 1993 – 19 September 1994
Minister for Environmental Protection and Regional Development	Ģirts Lūkins	Latvian Farmers' Union	3 August 1993 – 19 September 1994
Minister for Agriculture	Jānis Kinna	Latvian Farmers' Union	3 August 1993 – 19 September 1994
Special Assignments Minister	Edvīns Inkēns	Latvian Way	3 August 1993 – 19 September 1994
Minister of State for Foreign Trade and European Affairs	Oļģerts Pavlovskis	Latvian Way	3 August 1993 – 19 September 1994
Minister of State for Baltic and Nordic Affairs	Gunārs Meierovics	Latvian Way	3 August 1993 – 19 September 1994
Minister of State for the Budget	Jānis Platais	Independent	3 August 1993 – 19 September 1994
Minister of State for Human Rights	Olafs Brūvers	Independent	3 August 1993 – 19 September 1994
Minister of State for Labour	Andris Bērziņš	Latvian Way	3 August 1993 – 19 September 1994
Minister of State for Energy	Andris Krēsliņš	Independent	3 August 1993 – 19 September 1994
Minister of State for State Property	Edmunds Krastiņš	Latvian Farmers' Union	3 August 1993 – 19 September 1994
Minister of State for Culture	Raimonds Pauls	Independent	3 August 1993 – 20 September 1993
Minister of State for Culture	Jānis Dripe	Latvian Way	20 September 1993 - 19 September 1994
Minister of State for Privatisation	Druvis Skulte	Latvian Way	12 August 1993 - 19 September 1994
Minister of State for Health	Normunds Zemvaldis	Independent	20 September 1993 - 19 September 1994
Minister of State for Environmental Protection	Indulis Emsis	Latvian Green Party	3 August 1993 – 19 September 1994
Minister of State for Forests	Kazimirs Šļakota	Latvian Farmers' Union	3 August 1993 – 19 September 1994
Minister of State for State Revenue	Vilis Krištopans	Latvian Way	3 August 1993 – 19 September 1994
