= Gailis cabinet =

Gouvernment of Latvia 1990-1994

The Gailis cabinet was the government of Latvia from 19 September 1994 to 21 December 1995. It was led by Prime Minister Māris Gailis. It took office on 19 September 1994, after the resignation of Valdis Birkavs. It was replaced by the first Šķēle cabinet on 21 December 1995, after the September and October 1995 election.

Position	Name	Party	Dates
Prime Minister	Māris Gailis	Latvian Way	19 September 1994 – 21 December 1995
Deputy Prime Minister	Valdis Birkavs	Latvian Way	19 September 1994 – 21 December 1995
Deputy Prime Minister	Andris Piebalgs	Latvian Way	19 September 1994 – 25 May 1995
Deputy Prime Minister	Jānis Vaivads	Latvian Way	19 September 1994 – 27 May 1995
Deputy Prime Minister	Andris Bērziņš	Latvian Way	27 May 1995 – 21 December 1995
Deputy Prime Minister	Andris Gūtmanis	Latvian Way	25 May 1995 – 21 December 1995
Minister for Defence	Jānis Arveds Trapāns	Independent	19 September 1994 – 23 May 1995
Minister for Defence	Māris Gailis (interim)	Latvian Way	23 May 1995 – 21 December 1995
Minister for Foreign Affairs	Valdis Birkavs	Latvian Way	19 September 1994 – 21 December 1995
Minister for the Economy	Jānis Zvanītājs	Political Union of Economists	19 September 1994 – 21 December 1995
Minister for Finance	Andris Piebalgs	Latvian Way	19 September 1994 – 25 May 1995
Minister for Finance	Indra Sāmīte	Latvian Way	25 May 1995 – 21 December 1995
Minister for the Interior	Ģirts Valdis Kristovskis	Latvian Way	19 September 1994 – 28 October 1994
Minister for the Interior	Māris Gailis (interim)	Latvian Way	28 October 1994 – 11 November 1994
Minister for the Interior	Jānis Ādamsons	Latvian Way	11 November 1994 – 21 December 1995
Minister for Education and Science	Jānis Vaivads	Latvian Way	19 September 1994 – 27 May 1995
Minister for Education and Science	Jānis Dripe (interim)	Latvian Way	27 May 1995 – 8 June 1995
Minister for Education and Science	Jānis Gaigals	Latvian Way	9 June 1995 – 21 December 1995
Minister for Culture	Jānis Dripe	Latvian Way	19 September 1994 – 21 December 1995
Minister for Welfare	Andris Bērziņš	Latvian Way	19 September 1994 – 21 December 1995
Minister for Transport	Andris Gūtmanis	Latvian Way	19 September 1994 – 21 December 1995
Minister for Justice	Romāns Apsītis	Latvian Way	19 September 1994 – 21 December 1995
Minister for National Reform	Vita Anda Tērauda	Latvian Way	19 September 1994 – 30 June 1995
Minister for Environmental Protection and Regional Development	Juris Iesalnieks	Political Union of Economists	19 September 1994 – 21 December 1995
Minister for Agriculture	Ārijs Ūdris	Latvian Way	19 September 1994 – 21 December 1995
Minister of State for Baltic and Nordic Affairs	Gunārs Meierovics	Latvian Way	19 September 1994 – 21 December 1995
Minister of State	Oļģerts Raimonds Pavlovskis	Latvian Way	19 September 1994 – 21 December 1995
Minister of State	Jānis Ritenis	Latvian Farmers' Union	19 September 1994 – 21 December 1995
Minister of State for External Affairs	Indra Sāmīte	Latvian Way	19 September 1994 – 21 December 1995
Minister of State for State Property	Dainis Tunsts	Political Union of Economists	19 September 1994 – 21 December 1995
Minister of State for Industrial Policy and Privatisation	Druvis Skulte	Latvian Way	19 September 1994 – 20 March 1995
Minister of State for Industrial Policy and Privatisation	Jānis Zvanītājs (interim)	Political Union of Economists	20 March 1995 – 4 April 1995
Minister of State for Energy	Raimonds Jonīts	Independent	5 April 1995 – 21 December 1995
Minister of State for Health	Juris Ozoliņš	Latvian Way	19 September 1994 – 21 December 1995
Minister of State for Health	Normunds Zemvaldis	Independent	19 September 1994 – 16 January 1995
Minister of State for Health	Andris Bērziņš (interim)	Latvian Way	17 January 2005 – 3 February 1995
Minister of State for Health	Pēteris Apinis	Latvian Way	3 February 1995 – 21 December 1995
Minister of State for Human Rights	Jānis Ārvaldis Tupesis	Latvian Farmers' Union	19 September 1994 – 31 July 1995
Minister of State for the Environment	Indulis Emsis	Latvian Green Party	19 September 1994 – 21 December 1995
Minister of State for Local Government	Jānis Bunkšs	Latvian Way	20 July 1995 – 21 December 1995
Minister of State for Cooperation	Vilnis Edvīns Bresis	Political Union of Economists	19 September 1994 – 21 December 1995
Minister of State for Forests	Kazimirs Šļakota	Independent	19 September 1994 – 1 January 1995
Minister of State for Forests	Ārijs Ūdris (interim)	Latvian Way	1 January 1995 – 19 January 1995
Minister of State for Forests	Arvīds Ozols	Latvian Green Party	20 January 1995 – 21 December 1995
Minister of State for Social Affairs	Vladimirs Makarovs	For Fatherland and Freedom	11 November 1994 – 11 December 1995
Minister of State for Social Affairs	Andris Bērziņš (interim)	Latvian Way	11 December 1995 – 21 December 1995
Minister of State for State Revenue	Aija Poča	Latvian Way	1 June 1995 – 21 December 1995
