= Krištopans cabinet =

The Krištopans cabinet was the government of Latvia from 26 November 1998 to 16 July 1999. It was led by Prime Minister Vilis Krištopans. It took office on 26 November 1998, after the October 1998 election. It was replaced by the third Šķēle cabinet on 16 July 1999, after Krištopans's resignation.

Position	Name	Party	Dates
Prime Minister	Vilis Krištopans	Latvian Way	26 November 1998 – 16 July 1999
Deputy Prime Minister	Anatolijs Gorbunovs	Latvian Way	26 November 1998 - 16 July 1999
Deputy Prime Minister for European Union Affairs	Guntars Krasts	For Fatherland and Freedom/LNNK	26 November 1998 – 16 July 1999
Minister for Defence	Ģirts Valdis Kristovskis	For Fatherland and Freedom/LNNK	26 November 1998 – 16 July 1999
Minister for Foreign Affairs	Valdis Birkavs	Latvian Way	26 November 1998 – 16 July 1999
Minister for the Economy	Ainārs Šlesers	New Party	26 November 1998 – 10 May 1999
Minister for the Economy	Vilis Krištopans (interim)	Latvian Way	11 May 1999 – 19 May 1999
Minister for the Economy	Ingrīda Ūdre	New Party	20 May 1999 – 16 July 1999
Minister for Finance	Ivars Godmanis	Latvian Way	26 November 1998 – 16 July 1999
Minister for the Interior	Roberts Jurdžs	For Fatherland and Freedom/LNNK	26 November 1998 – 16 July 1999
Minister for Education and Science	Jānis Gaigals	Latvian Way	26 November 1998 – 16 July 1999
Minister for Culture	Karina Pētersone	Latvian Way	26 November 1998 – 16 July 1999
Minister for Welfare	Vladimirs Makarovs	For Fatherland and Freedom/LNNK	26 November 1998 – 16 July 1999
Minister for Transport	Anatolijs Gorbunovs	Latvian Way	26 November 1998 – 16 July 1999
Minister for Justice	Ingrīda Labucka	New Party	26 November 1998 – 16 July 1999
Minister for Environmental Protection and Regional Development	Vents Balodis	For Fatherland and Freedom/LNNK	26 November 1998 – 16 July 1999
Minister for Agriculture	Vilis Krištopans (interim)	Latvian Way	26 November 1998 – 23 December 1998
Minister for Agriculture	Vents Balodis	For Fatherland and Freedom/LNNK	23 December 1998 – 4 February 1999
Minister for Agriculture	Pēteris Salkazanovs	Latvian Social Democratic Workers' Party	5 February 1999 – 16 July 1999
Minister of State for State Revenue	Aija Poča	Latvian Way	26 November 1998 – 16 July 1999
Minister of State for the Environment	Inese Vaidere	For Fatherland and Freedom/LNNK	26 November 1998 – 16 July 1999
Minister of State for Health	Viktors Jaksons	For Fatherland and Freedom/LNNK	20 May 1999 – 16 July 1999
Minister of State for Higher Education and Science	Tatjana Koķe	New Party	20 May 1999 – 16 July 1999
Minister of State for Forests	Gints Kaktiņš	Latvian Social Democratic Workers' Party	20 May 1999 – 16 July 1999
Special Assignments Minister for State Administration and Local Government Reform	Jānis Bunkšs	Latvian Way	26 November 1998 – 16 July 1999
Special Assignments Minister for Cooperation and International Financial Institutions	Roberts Zīle	For Fatherland and Freedom/LNNK	26 November 1998 – 16 July 1999
