= First Godmanis cabinet =

The first Godmanis cabinet (Godmanis Cabinet I) was the government of Latvia from 7 May 1990 to 3 August 1993. It led Latvia to a restoration of its independence from the Soviet Union and was the first of two governments to be led by Ivars Godmanis, who was also Prime Minister from 2007 to 2009. It took office on 7 May 1990. It was replaced by the Birkavs cabinet on 3 August 1993, after the June 1993 election.

Position	Name	Party	Dates
Prime Minister	Ivars Godmanis	Popular Front of Latvia	7 May 1990 – 3 August 1993
Deputy Prime Minister	Arnis Kalniņš	Independent	7 May 1990 – 13 November 1991
Deputy Prime Minister	Ilmārs Bišers	Popular Front of Latvia	7 May 1990 – 13 November 1991
Minister for Defence	Tālavs Jundzis	Popular Front of Latvia	19 November 1991 – 3 August 1993
Minister for Architecture and Construction	Aivars Prūsis	Independent	16 May 1990 – 3 August 1993
Minister for Foreign Trade	Edgars Zausājevs	Popular Front of Latvia	19 November 1991 – 3 March 1993
Minister for Foreign Affairs	Jānis Jurkāns	Popular Front of Latvia	22 May 1990 – 10 November 1992
Minister for Foreign Affairs	Georgs Andrejevs	Latvian Way	10 November 1992 – 3 August 1993
Minister for the Economy	Jānis Āboltiņš	Independent	7 May 1990 – 13 November 1991
Minister for Economic Reform	Arnis Kalniņš	Independent	19 November 1991 – 12 January 1993
Minister for Economic Reform	Aivars Kreituss	Independent	19 January 1993 – 3 August 1993
Minister for Energy	Auseklis Lazdiņš	Independent	15 May 1990 – 13 November 1991
Minister for Finance	Elmārs Siliņš	Independent	14 May 1990 – 18 May 1993
Minister for the Interior	Aloizs Vaznis	Independent	4 June 1990 – 20 November 1991
Minister for the Interior	Ziedonis Čevers	Independent	20 November 1991 – 3 August 1993
Minister for Maritime Affairs	Andrejs Dandzbergs	Independent	19 November 1991 – 3 August 1993
Minister for Culture	Raimonds Pauls	Independent	16 May 1990 – 3 August 1993
Minister for Welfare	Teodors Eniņš	Popular Front of Latvia	19 November 1991 – 3 August 1993
Minister for Agriculture	Dainis Ģēģeris	Popular Front of Latvia	15 May 1990 – 4 May 1993
Minister for Material Resources	Edgars Zausājevs	Popular Front of Latvia	15 May 1990 – 13 November 1991
Minister of State for Forests	Kārlis Bans	Independent	3 August 1990 – 19 November 1991
Minister for Forests	Kazimirs Šļakota	Independent	19 November 1991 – 3 August 1993
Minister for Industry	Jānis Oherins	Independent	5 June 1990 – 13 November 1991
Minister for Industry and Energy	Aivars Millers	Independent	19 November 1991 – 3 August 1993
Minister for Communications	Pēteris Videnieks	Independent	22 May 1990 – 13 November 1991
Minister for Transport	Jānis Janovskis	Independent	15 May 1990 – 11 January 1992
Minister for Transport	Andris Gūtmanis	Independent	4 March 1992 – 3 August 1993
Minister for Social Security	Uldis Gundars	Independent	18 May 1990 – 13 November 1991
Minister for National Education	Andris Piebalgs	Popular Front of Latvia	18 May 1990 – 3 August 1993
Minister for Justice	Viktors Skudra	Popular Front of Latvia	5 June 1990 – 18 May 1993
Minister for Trade	Armands Plaudis	Independent	15 May 1990 – 13 November 1991
Minister for Health	Edvīns Platkājis	Independent	16 May 1990 – 13 November 1991
Minister for Government Affairs	Kārlis Līcis	Independent	16 May 1990 – 13 November 1991
Special Assignments Minister for Fisheries	Gunārs Zakss	Independent	3 August 1990 – 19 November 1991
Minister of State	Jānis Dinevičs	Independent	19 November 1991 – 3 August 1993

== See also ==
- 1990 Latvian Supreme Soviet election
