= Fifth Saeima of Latvia =

Parliament of Latvia 1993–1995

Fifth Saeima of the Republic of Latvia: 5. Latvijas Republikas Saeima

History
- Preceded by: Supreme Council of the Republic of Latvia
- Succeeded by: 6th Saeima

Leadership
- Speaker of the Saeima: Anatolijs Gorbunovs

Structure
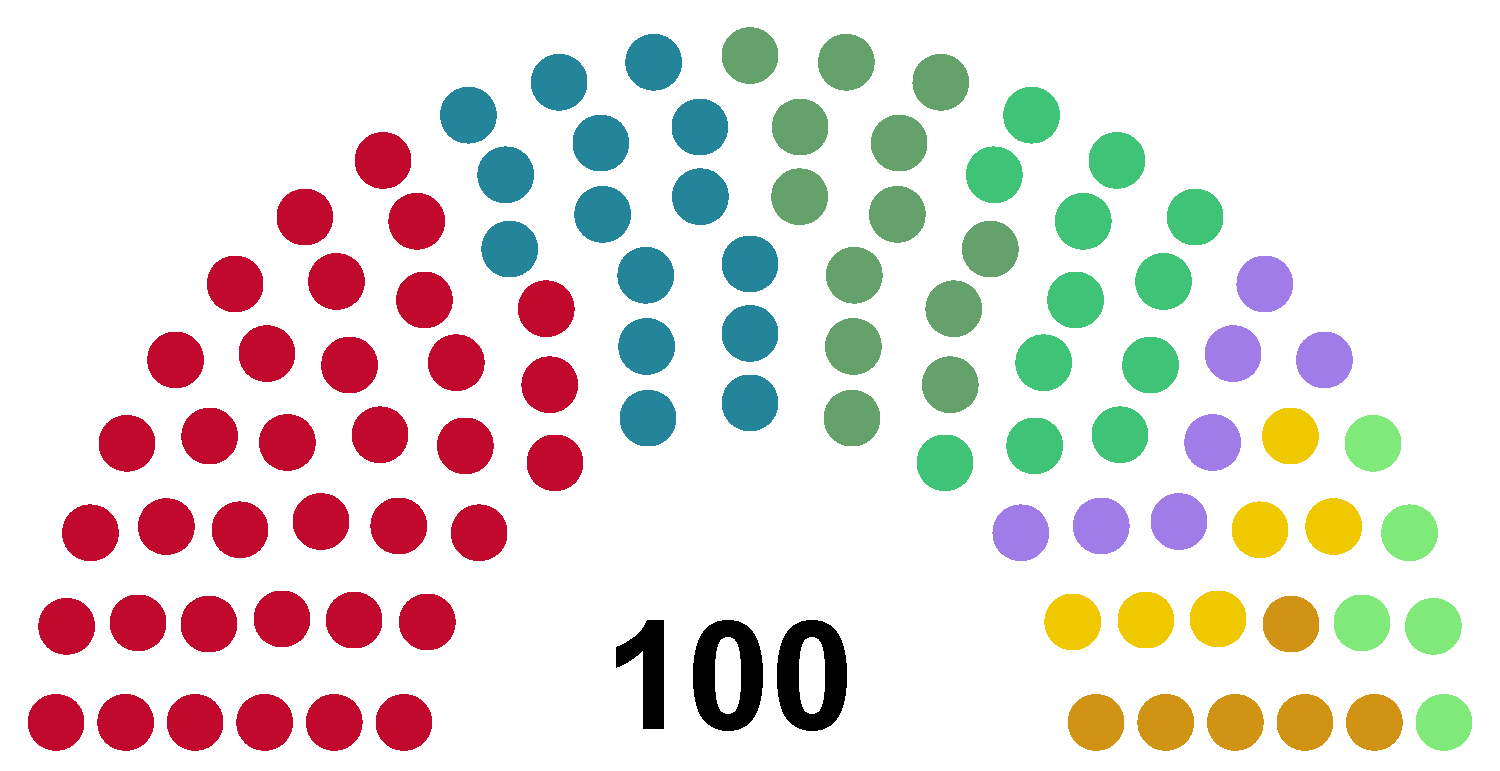

Fifth Saeima of Latvia was the Parliament of the Republic of Latvia in the period from July 6, 1993 to November 6, 1995. It was the first Latvian Saeima since 1934, when the 4th Saeima ended. Until the 5th Saeima, the country was governed by the Supreme Council of the Republic of Latvia.

== Elections and Parties ==
The 5th Saeima elections took place on June 5 and 6, 1993. 23 political parties took part in the elections. 1,118,316 voters had voted, representing 89.9% of 1,243,956 eligible voters. The following 8 parties overcame the 4% barrier and entered the Saeima:

- Latvian Way – 36 seats
- Latvian National Independence Movement – 15 seats
- National Harmony Party – 13 places
- Latvian Farmers' Union – 12 seats
- Equal Rights – 7 seats
- For Fatherland and Freedom – 6 places
- Union of Christian Democrats – 6 seats
- Democratic Center Party – 5 seats

== Activities of the 5th Saeima ==
The Speaker of the 5th Saeima was Anatolijs Gorbunovs (Latvian Way). There were 15 commissions in the Saeima, as well as several sub-commissions and investigation commissions. 137 meetings were held in the Saeima, in which 839 laws were reviewed, the Satversme was renewed, the Law of 1925 "On the Structure of the Cabinet of Ministers" was adopted, the Citizenship Law, the Corruption Prevention Law were adopted, local government reform was passed, and an agreement on complete withdrawal of the Armed Forces of the Russian Federation was concluded.

During the 5th Saeima, the Cabinet of Ministers of Birkavs and the Cabinet of Ministers of Gailis.
