= Krasts =

Krasts may refer to:

- Guntars Krasts, Latvian politician
- Krasts cabinet, former government of Latvia (1997–1998)
- Lūkass Krasts, Latvian luger
