= Jānis Ādamsons =

Latvian politician

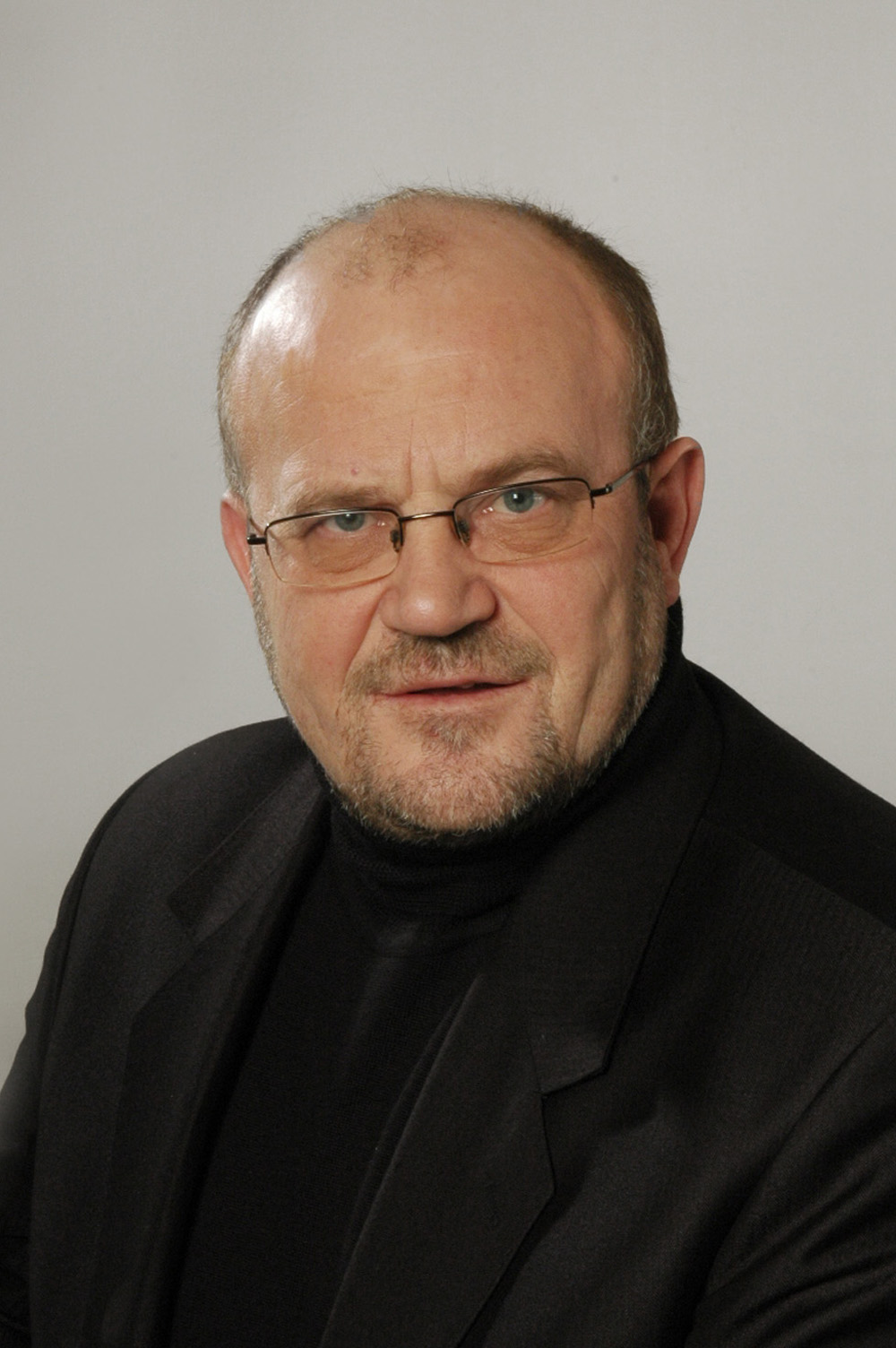

Deputy of the 12th Saeima
- Incumbent
- Assumed office 4 October 2014

Personal details
- Born: 3 November 1956 (age 69) Turki parish, Latvian SSR (Now Līvāni Municipality, Latvia)
- Party: Harmony
- Other political affiliations: Latvian Social Democratic Workers' Party (1997-); Latvian Way (1995-1997)
- Nickname: "Captain Shark"

Military service
- Branch/service: State Border Guard
- Years of service: (-1994)
- Rank: Captain

Jānis Ādamsons (born 3 November 1956, Preiļi, Latvian SSR) is a Latvian politician. He is a member of Harmony and a deputy of the 12th Saeima.

== Early life ==
Ādamsons graduated from the Kiev Higher Naval School, which is now the location of the National University of Kyiv-Mohyla Academy, in 1979 as a navigator and then served in the Soviet Union's Far East (Shikotan, Sakhalin, Nakhodka) with the border troops for ten years. From 1992 to 1994, he was Chief of Staff of the Naval Forces of Latvia after which, in 1994, he became commander of border troops. From April 1994 to November 1995, he was Minister of Internal Affairs. He was a 7th Saeima deputy on the Commission for Defense and Internal Affairs from 1995 to 1998.

Prior to his political career, Ādamsons was chief of the Latvian Navy Headquarters, then a sea captain in the Latvian Border Guard Brigade. He was released from active duty on 25 November 1994. He was then appointed as Interior Minister in early 1995 after a large number of prisoners escaped, and Girts Kristovskis resigned.

== Latvian Way ==
In June 1995, Ādamsons' name was submitted by the Latvian Way party as a potential deputy in the general elections. During the campaign, it was suggested that he was not legally discharged from military service, and as such was ineligible to stand as a party candidate. As Ādamsons had submitted his nomination to the Central Election Committee himself, there was no party oversight to ensure no mistakes had been made. The allegations were dismissed by then Prime Minister Māris Gailis as being made in bad-faith by those affected by Ādamsons' work fighting crime. The Latvian Central Electoral Committee also dismissed the allegations saying that there was no reason to investigate, as they had no evidence Ādamsons was still in the military. The claims were originally published by the Baltic News Service, and no other evidence was offered.

In October 1995, the Latvian Way party won 14.6% of the votes in the general election, giving them 17 mandates in the Saeima, of which Ādamsons was one. He was removed as Interior Minister, and instead became an acting member of parliament.

== Latvian Social Democratic Workers' Party ==
On 25 September 1996 Ādamsons resigned from the Latvian Way party, and a month later joined the Latvian Social Democratic Workers' Party. Party insiders acknowledged that he had wanted to leave for some time, Ādamsons cited his opposition to Andris Šķēle as the main reason for leaving. He voted against Šķēle in December 1995, which had put him at odds with his former party. His joining the party meant that it officially had representation in parliament, and his new position gave him automatic membership of the LSDSP Central Committee.

In 1997 Ādamsons served as the head of the communications committee at the Baltic Assembly. In October of the same year he was elected to be Chairman of the LSDW.

== Accusations against Andris Šķēle ==
Throughout late 1995 to early 1996, Ādamsons accused then Prime Minister Andris Šķēle of provoking unrest with border and custom officials by deliberately and illegally sending through fake smugglers. He also accused Andris of embezzling 'foreign credits', and of deliberately bankrupting state-run industries in the interest of privatizing the personally profiting from them. Ādamsons was himself investigated to see whether or not this constituted slander. The Prosecutor General's office declined to prosecute either, finding no illegalities in their past behaviour.

On 15 July 1996, Ādamsons went on television once again to accuse Šķēle of corruption, but also inferred that masons were partially responsible for the internal unrest in the government. By February 1997 Ādamsons was calling for an early election and characterized Šķēle's government as an authoritarian regime from which Latvia should be saved.

In 2000 Ādamsons,. who was assisting with a 12-year investigation into the matter, publicly named Šķēle as a member of a ring of pedophiles selling young boys for sex. He defended naming Šķēle as a necessary action stating that he was "at the end of [his] rope...it was the only way to break the circle."

== Removal from Parliament and appeal ==
In 2000, Ādamsons was removed from parliament after evidence surfaced that he had previously worked in collaboration with the KGB. An investigation ruled that as a member of the coast guard during soviet rule, he was subservient to the agency. In October 2006 the European Court of Human Rights reviewed a petition by Ādamsons to overturn his removal on the grounds that over 40,000 men worked for the border guards but he, specifically, was targeted for removal, when men like Janis Zascirinskis were allowed to stay in politics.

== Espionage charges ==
On 11 June 2021, Ādamsons was arrested and charged with spying for Russia. The Saeima had voted to remove his parliamentary immunity the day before. He was convicted and sentenced to 8.5 years for spying for Russia on 9 November 2023, along with a Russian accomplice.

== Personal life ==
Ādamsons credits his belief in 'Eastern Religions' and reincarnation as the reason "why I am so calm when it comes to the activities of dark forces, including masons' activities, everything that is taking place in Latvia. The light will win anyhow".

== Controversy ==
In December 1996, Ādamsons left his loaded firearm hidden under a stack of paper during a meeting in the Saeima. This led to a permanent ban on handguns in the building.
