= Indulis Emsis =

Latvian biologist and politician (born 1952)

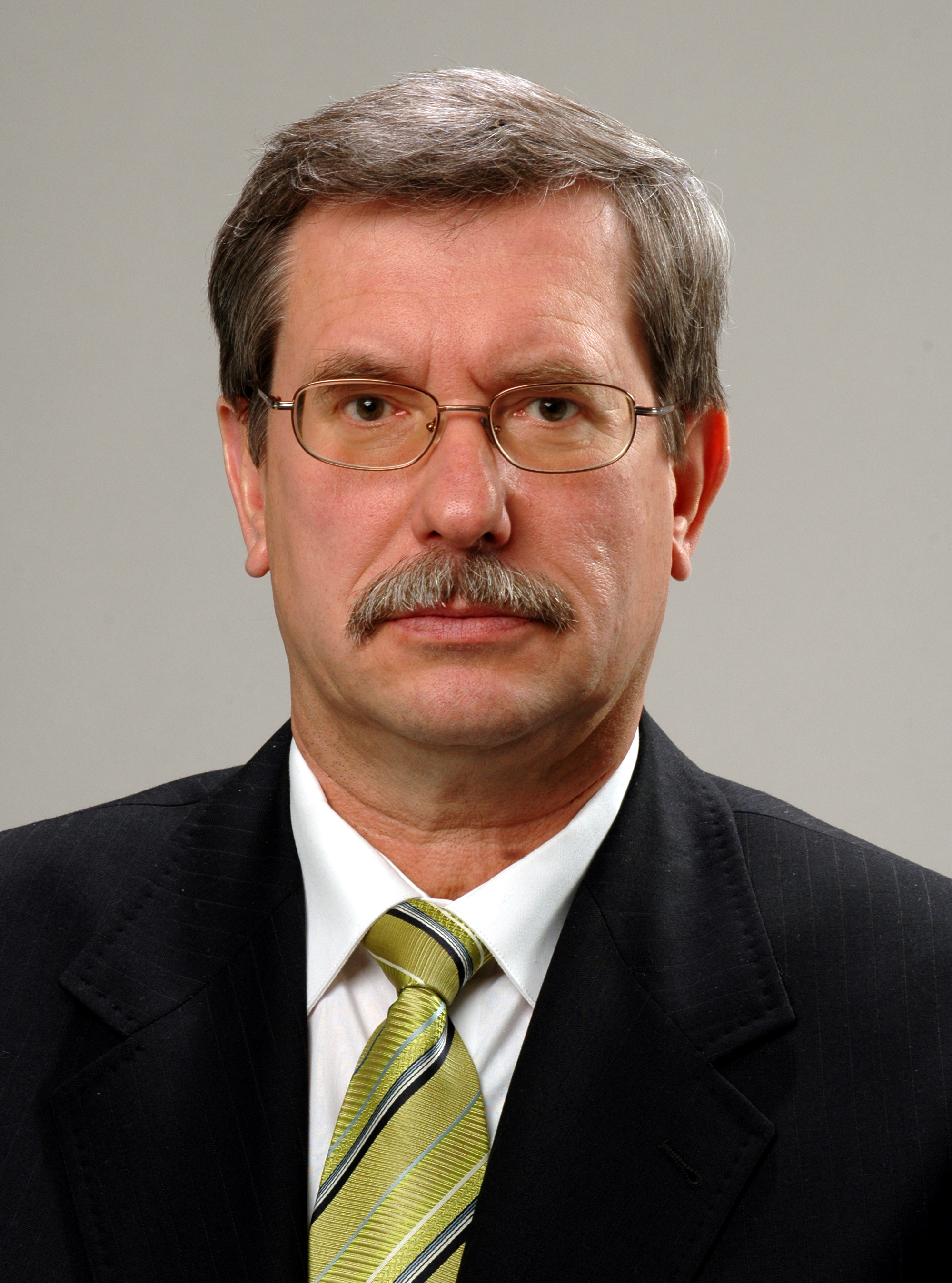
- Emsis in 2004

18th Prime Minister of Latvia
- In office 9 March 2004 – 2 December 2004
- President: Vaira Vīķe-Freiberga
- Preceded by: Einars Repše
- Succeeded by: Aigars Kalvītis

Speaker of the Saeima
- In office 7 November 2006 – 24 September 2007
- Preceded by: Ingrīda Ūdre
- Succeeded by: Gundars Daudze

Personal details
- Born: 2 January 1952 (age 74) Salacgriva, Latvian Soviet Socialist Republic
- Party: Green Party
- Education: University of Latvia

Indulis Emsis (born 2 January 1952) is a Latvian biologist and politician. He was Prime Minister of Latvia for ten months in 2004, the first Green politician to lead a country in the history of the world. He was Speaker of the Saeima, the Latvian parliament from 2006 to 2007. Emsis' political views are described as rather conservative, unusual for members of green parties around the world.

== Early life ==
Emsis graduated from Riga First Secondary School in 1970 and graduated from the University of Latvia with a degree in biology in 1975. In 1986, he received his PhD, also in biology. Until 1990, he worked as a research scientist in environmental science. From 1976 to 1987 Emsis worked as a research associate at the scientific production association "Silava", and head of its labor protection laboratory between 1987 and 1989. Emsis also worked as deputy chairman of the Soviet Latvia's State Nature Protection Committee.

== Start of political career ==
In 1990, he became one of founders of Latvian Green Party (LZP) and served as Minister for the environment in the 1990s, working especially for a clean Baltic Sea. He is currently one of the three chairpersons of the Latvian Green Party, which forms a part of Union of Greens and Farmers. Emsis was included on the Green ticket for the 5th Saeima elections in 1993. Emsis was appointed special assignments minister of natural protection in Ministry of Environmental Protection and Regional Development in the government of Valdis Birkavs in 1993. Emsis also held the office in the government of Māris Gailis in 1994.

Emsis was elected to the 6th Saeima from the ticket of LNNK/LZP in 1995. As a member of the 6th Saeima, Emsis was elected to the parliament's Economic Policy Committee. Emsis was appointed special assignments minister of environment in the ministry of Environmental Protection and Regional Development when Andris Šķēle's government was approved in 1995. Emsis again assumed the post when Šķēle returned with a new government in 1997, and also held it in the government of Guntars Krasts.

In 1996, Emsis was awarded the Three Star Order (3rd category). In 1998, Emsis was appointed head of a task force to prepare a development program for Latvia's small ports, and chairman of committee for assessment of conformity of beaches and yacht ports. In 1998, Emsis joined the parliamentary group of the Labor Party, Union of Christian Democrats and LZP. He was included on the three parties' joint ticket for the 7th Saeima elections. In 1998, Emsis assumed the post of Prime Minister Vilis Krištopans' non-staff advisor on environmental protection issues.

In 2000, LZP congress nominated Emsis as the party's candidate for Riga mayor ahead of municipal elections. Emsis was elected to the Riga City Council form LZP ticket in March 2001, he worked as deputy chairman of the city council's City Development Committee.

In October 2002, Emsis was included on the ZZS ticket for the 8th Saeima elections. Emsis was elected to Saeima, and was appointed deputy chairman of the ZZS parliamentary group. Emsis was elected head of the Economic, Agricultural, Environmental and Regional Policy Committee, he also worked on the Public Expenditure and Audit Committee.

== As prime minister ==
After the resignation of New Era Party leader Einars Repše's government, President Vaira Vīķe-Freiberga assigned Emsis to form a new government; the Saeima voted Emsis' government in office in March 2004.

On 9 March 2004, he became the prime minister of Latvia, leading a centre-right minority government consisting of The Greens and Farmers union, Latvia's First Party and Latvian People's Party. For most of time, the government was also supported by the leftist National Harmony Party.

Emsis was the first member of a Green party to become Prime Minister of a country. On 28 October 2004, the government fell as the Saeima voted 39–53 against the government's budget proposal for the year 2005. He left office on 2 December 2004, when parliament confirmed Aigars Kalvītis of the People's Party as Prime Minister.

== Speaker of Saeima ==
Emsis returned to the Saeima in December 2004. In October 2006, Emsis was elected to the 9th Saeima from the ticket of the Union of Greens and Farmers. On 7 November 2006, he was elected Speaker of the Saeima, defeating Sandra Kalniete of the New Era Party by 74 votes to 22. In September 2007, he resigned after a criminal investigation was opened amid allegations of corruption regarding a briefcase containing $10,000 which he lost in the Cabinet of Ministers building; on 26 October, he confessed to giving false testimony in the investigation and was issued a fine.

== COVID-19 ==
On 12 December 2021, Emsis made public statements on COVID-19 treatment very far removed from the scientific consensus.

Political offices
Preceded by Einars Repše	Prime Minister of Latvia; 2004	Succeeded by Aigars Kalvītis
Saeima
Preceded by Ingrīda Ūdre	Speaker of the Saeima; 2006–2007	Succeeded by Gundars Daudze
