= Repše cabinet =

The Repše cabinet was the government of Latvia from 7 November 2002 to 9 March 2004 when the government announced a resignation.

Position	Name	Dates	Party
Prime Minister	Einars Repše	7 November 2002 – 9 March 2004	New Era Party
Deputy Prime Minister	Ainārs Šlesers	7 November 2002 – 26 January 2004	Latvia's First Party
Deputy Prime Minister	Einars Repše (interim)	26 January 2004 – 9 March 2004	New Era Party
Minister for Defence	Ģirts Valdis Kristovskis	7 November 2002 – 9 March 2004	TB/LNNK
Minister for Foreign Affairs	Sandra Kalniete	7 November 2002 – 9 March 2004	Independent
Minister for the Economy	Juris Lujāns	7 November 2002 – 29 January 2004	Latvia's First Party
Minister for the Economy	Ivars Gaters (interim)	30 January 2004 – 9 March 2004	New Era Party
Minister for Finance	Valdis Dombrovskis	7 November 2002 – 9 March 2004	New Era Party
Minister for the Interior	Māris Gulbis	7 November 2002 – 9 March 2004	New Era Party
Minister for Science and Education	Kārlis Šadurskis	7 November 2002 – 9 March 2004	New Era Party
Minister for Culture	Inguna Rībena	7 November 2002 – 9 March 2004	New Era Party
Minister for Welfare	Dagnija Staķe	7 November 2002 – 9 March 2004	Union of Greens and Farmers
Minister for Regional Development and Local Government	Ivars Gaters	16 January 2003 – 9 March 2004	New Era Party
Minister for Transport	Roberts Zīle	7 November 2002 – 9 March 2004	TB/LNNK
Minister for Justice	Aivars Aksenoks	7 November 2002 – 9 March 2004	New Era Party
Minister for Health	Āris Auders	16 January 2003 – 20 March 2003	New Era Party
Minister for Health	Einars Repše (interim)	20 March 2003 – 10 April 2003	New Era Party
Minister for Health	Ingrīda Circene	10 April 2003 – 9 March 2004	New Era Party
Minister for the Environment	Raimonds Vējonis	7 November 2002 – 9 March 2004	Union of Greens and Farmers
Minister for Environment Protection and Regional Development	Raimonds Vējonis	7 November 2002 – 16 January 2003	Union of Greens and Farmers
Minister for Agriculture	Mārtiņš Roze	7 November 2002 – 9 March 2004	Union of Greens and Farmers
Special Assignments Minister for Regional Development and Local Government	Ivars Gaters	7 November 2002 – 16 January 2003	New Era Party
Special Assignments Minister for Health	Āris Auders	7 November 2002 – 16 January 2003	New Era Party
Special Assignments Minister for Child and Family Policy	Ainars Baštiks	7 November 2002 – 29 January 2004	Latvia's First Party
Special Assignments Minister for Child and Family Policy	Dagnija Staķe (interim)	30 January 2004 – 9 March 2004	Union of Greens and Farmers
Special Assignments Minister for Social Integration	Nils Muižnieks	7 November 2002 – 29 January 2004	Latvia's First Party
Special Assignments Minister for Social Integration	Aivars Aksenoks (interim)	30 January 2004 – 9 March 2004	New Era Party
