= Guntis Ulmanis =

Latvian politician (born 1939)

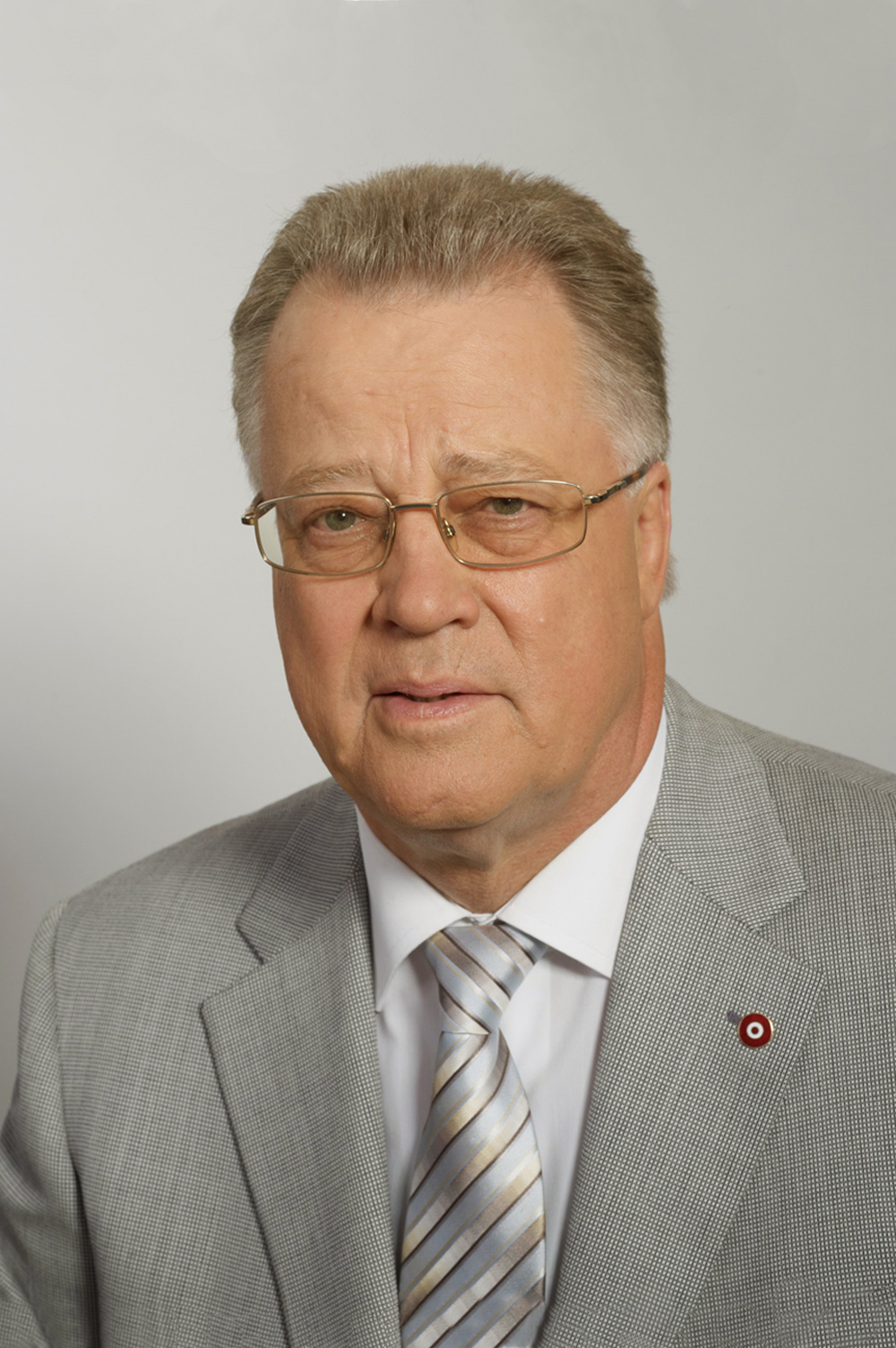
- Ulmanis in 2010

5th President of Latvia
- In office 7 July 1993 – 7 July 1999
- Prime Minister: Ivars Godmanis; Valdis Birkavs; Māris Gailis; Andris Šķēle; Guntars Krasts; Vilis Krištopāns
- Preceded by: Position re-established Kārlis Ulmanis (1941)
- Succeeded by: Vaira Vīķe-Freiberga

Personal details
- Born: 13 September 1939 (age 87) Riga, Latvia
- Party: Latvian Farmers' Union
- Spouse: Aina Ulmane
- Children: 2
- Education: University of Latvia
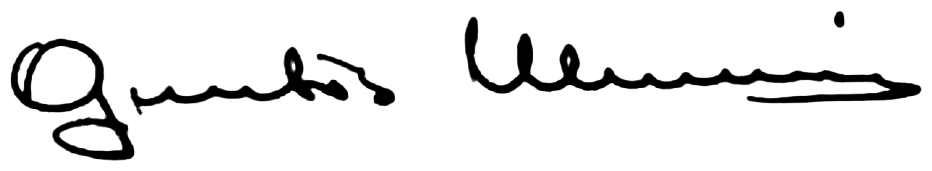
- Signature

Guntis Ulmanis (born 13 September 1939) is a Latvian politician and the fifth president of Latvia from 1993 to 1999.

== Biography ==
=== Early life ===
Guntis Ulmanis was born in Riga on 13 September 1939. His great uncle Kārlis Ulmanis was one of the most prominent Latvian politicians during the interwar period, in 1934 he established an authoritarian regime and subsequently adopted the title President of Latvia. In 1941, following the Soviet occupation, Guntis Ulmanis and his family were deported to Krasnoyarsk Krai, Siberia, Russian SFSR.

In 1946, they returned to Latvia, but were not allowed to settle in Riga, so they stayed at Ēdole in the Kuldīga area of the Latvian SSR.

In 1949, the remainder of the Ulmanis family was supposed to be deported in the upcoming March deportation, but Guntis Ulmanis was able to avoid that fate, as his mother remarried and his surname was changed to Rumpītis. In 1955 upon receiving his first passport Ulmanis chose to use his birth surname.

They then moved to Jūrmala, where he attended school. After graduating, he entered the economic faculty of the Latvian State University.

=== Career in Latvia ===
After completing his studies in the university in 1963, he was drafted into the Soviet army, where he served for two years. In 1965 he joined the Communist Party of the Soviet Union. He began working as an economist at a construction site and was later promoted to tram and trolleybus administrator in Riga.

He was then advanced to the position of deputy chairman of the planning committee of the Riga Executive Committee (city government). However, his family ties with President Ulmanis were discovered and he was sacked in 1971.

He then worked at lower positions in the Riga municipal service system. For some time he worked as a teacher of construction economics at the Riga Polytechnical Institute and of economic planning at the Latvian State University.

In 1989, during the Singing Revolution, Guntis Rumpītis quit the Communist Party and returned to using his original surname – Ulmanis. In 1992, he was appointed Council Member of the National Bank of Latvia.

He also joined the Latvian Farmers' Union, his great-uncle's party, the same year. In 1993, following the first elections to the Saeima in 62 years, he was elected as the 5th President of Latvia (the first since the full restoration of independence in 1991). In the first round of the indirect election, he finished third (after Gunārs Meierovics and Aivars Jerumanis), but won in the runoff as Meierovics quit the race.

=== Presidency ===
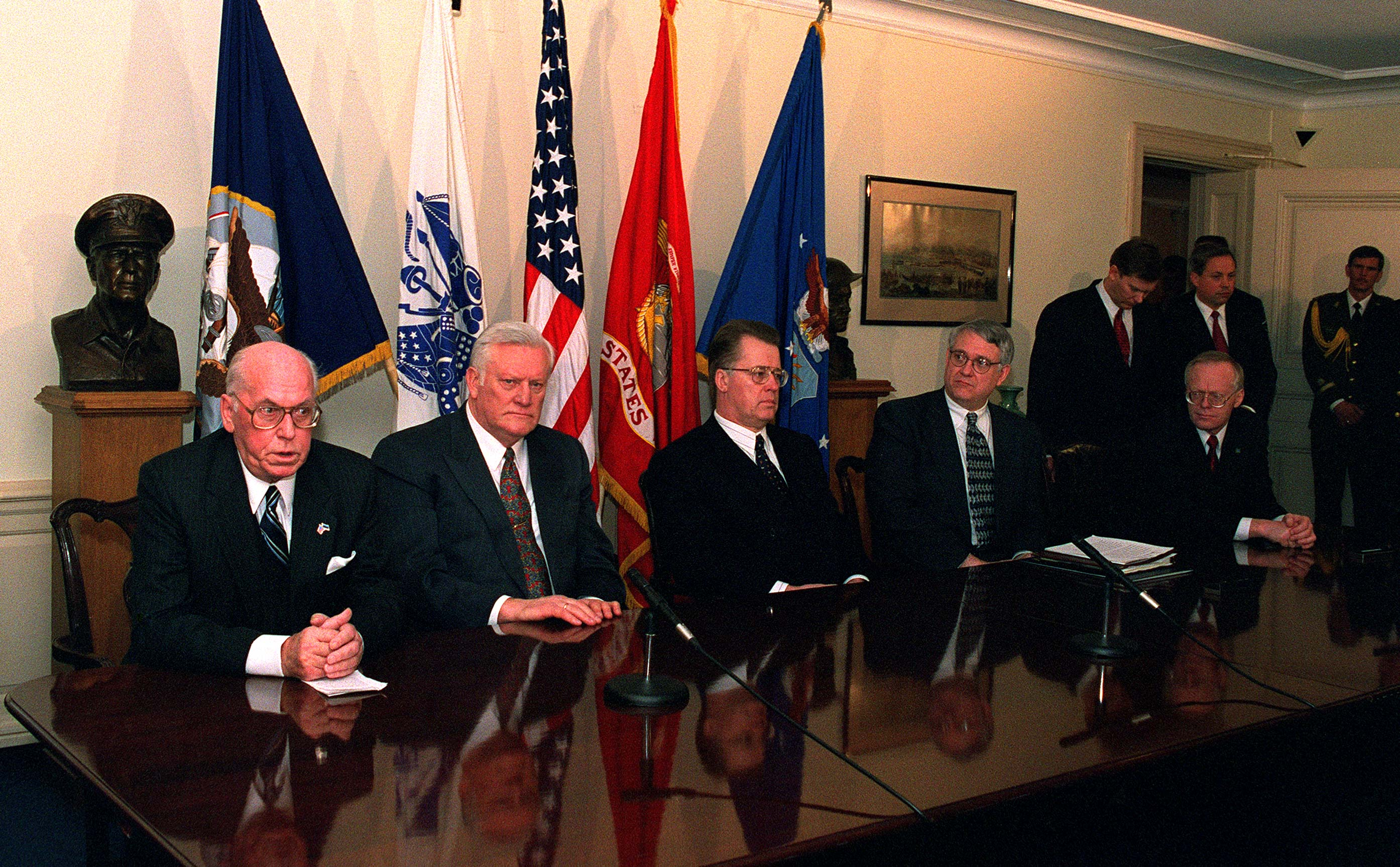
Guntis Ulmanis (centre) with President of Lithuania Algirdas Brazauskas (second from left) and President of Estonia Lennart Meri (first from left) during a visit to the United States in 1998

As President, Guntis Ulmanis focused on foreign policy, building relations with international and regional organizations, as well as other countries. A major achievement was the conclusion of the Latvian-Russian treaty on the withdrawal of Russian Armed Forces from Latvia.

During his presidency, Latvia joined the Council of Europe and sent its application to the European Union. He announced a moratorium on the death penalty, in accordance with the norms of the European Council.

In 1996, he was re-elected in the first round of elections, defeating Saeima speaker Ilga Kreituse, Imants Liepa and former Communist Party chairman Alfrēds Rubiks, who was in jail at the time.

In 1998 President Ulmanis actively supported amendments to the Citizenship law, that would allow all people born after 21 August 1991 to obtain citizenship and would eliminate so-called "naturalization limits" (in which only a limited number of non-citizens could receive citizenship within a given year). However, he was forced to send the law project on a referendum, after 36 nationalistic deputies, opposed to the amendment petitioned him to do so. He then actively and successfully campaigned for the adoption of the amendments by the population.

=== Retirement and subsequent return to politics ===
Guntis Ulmanis' term finished in 1999 and he was succeeded by Vaira Vīķe-Freiberga. He retired from politics but became a social activist, founding the Guntis Ulmanis Fund, organizing the 2006 IIHF World Championship in Riga and heading the Riga Castle reconstruction council.

2010 marked a return to big politics for Guntis Ulmanis. He became the chairman of the newly created party alliance For a Good Latvia, which was composed of the People's Party and Latvia's First Party/Latvian Way. The alliance won only 8 seats in the October 2010 parliamentary election.

However, Ulmanis became a Saeima deputy. In 2011 he announced he did not want to run for another term as a deputy in the 2011 election. He, therefore, ceased being a deputy in November 2011, after the 11th Saeima was inaugurated.

== Personal life ==
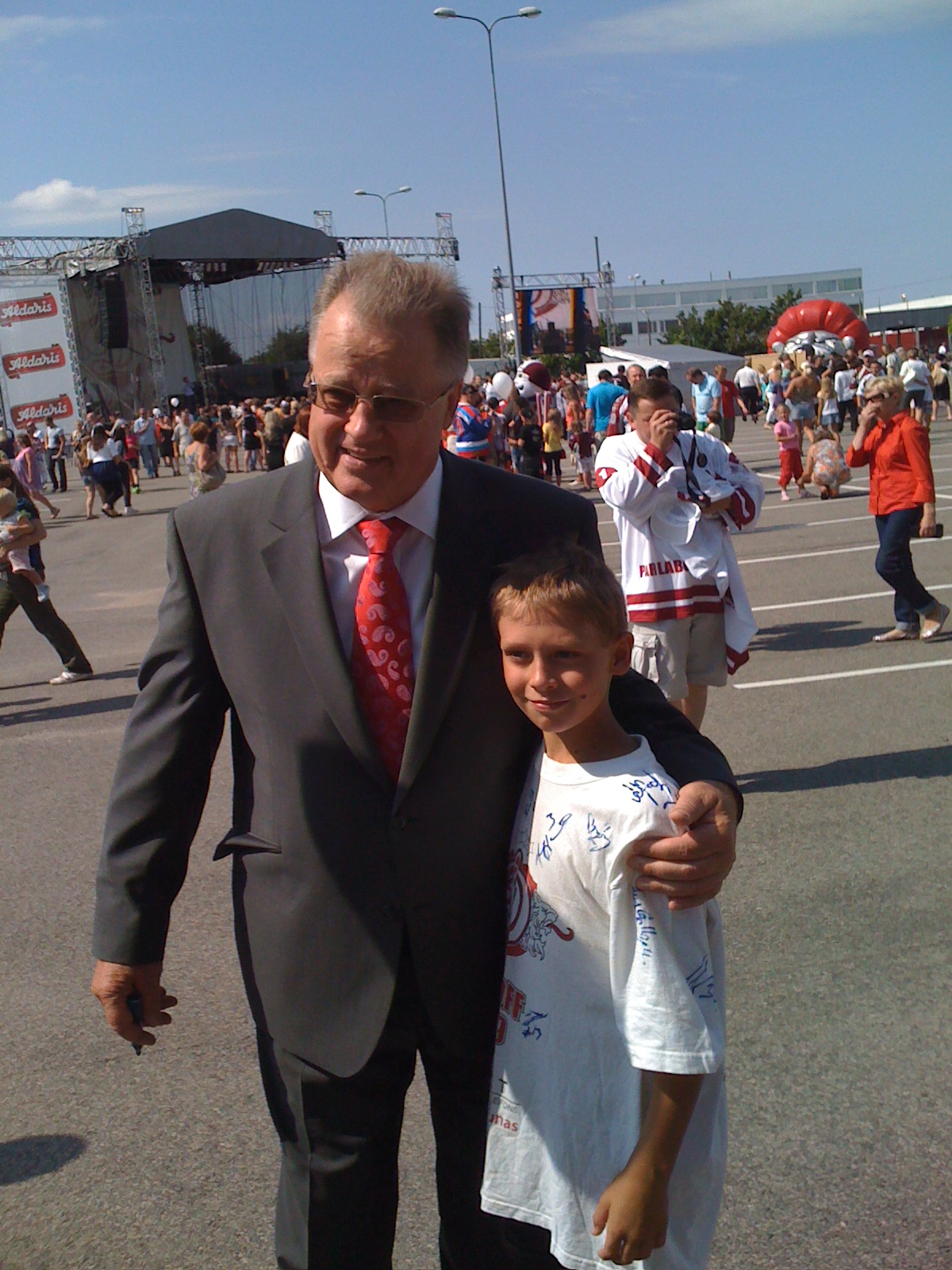
Guntis Ulmanis with young Dinamo Riga fan in 2013

Guntis Ulmanis has been married to Aina Ulmane (maiden name Štelce) since 1962. They have two children: Guntra (b. 1963) and Alvils (b. 1966) and three grandchildren. In his spare time, Ulmanis enjoys reading history books and memoirs, playing tennis, basketball and volleyball. He is known to also spend summers in his home in Smārde Parish.

He has written two autobiographies: No tevis jau neprasa daudz (Not much is required from you yet) (1995) and Mans prezidenta laiks (My time as President) (1999).

He is a member of the international advisory council of the Victims of Communism Memorial Foundation.

On 21 September 2015 he became CEO of the hockey club Dinamo Riga after the previous CEO Aigars Kalvītis stepped down to take a CEO position in the company Latvijas Gāze.

== Honours ==
=== National honours ===
- Latvia:
  - Commander Grand Cross with Chain of the Order of the Three Stars

=== Foreign honours ===
- Denmark:
  - Knight of the Order of the Elephant (18 March 1997) - See Latvian Knights of the Order of the Elephant
- Estonia:
  - Collar of the Order of the Cross of Terra Mariana (23 October 1996)
- Germany:
  - Grand Cross Special Class of the Order of Merit of the Federal Republic of Germany
- Iceland:
  - Knight Grand Cross of the Order of the Falcon (8 June 1998)
- Norway:
  - Knight Grand Cross of the Order of St. Olav
- Poland:
  - Order of the White Eagle

Political offices
Preceded by Anatolijs Gorbunovs; Acting	President of Latvia; 1991 – 1999	Succeeded by Vaira Vīķe-Freiberga
