= Ingrīda Ūdre =

Latvian politician (1958–2024)

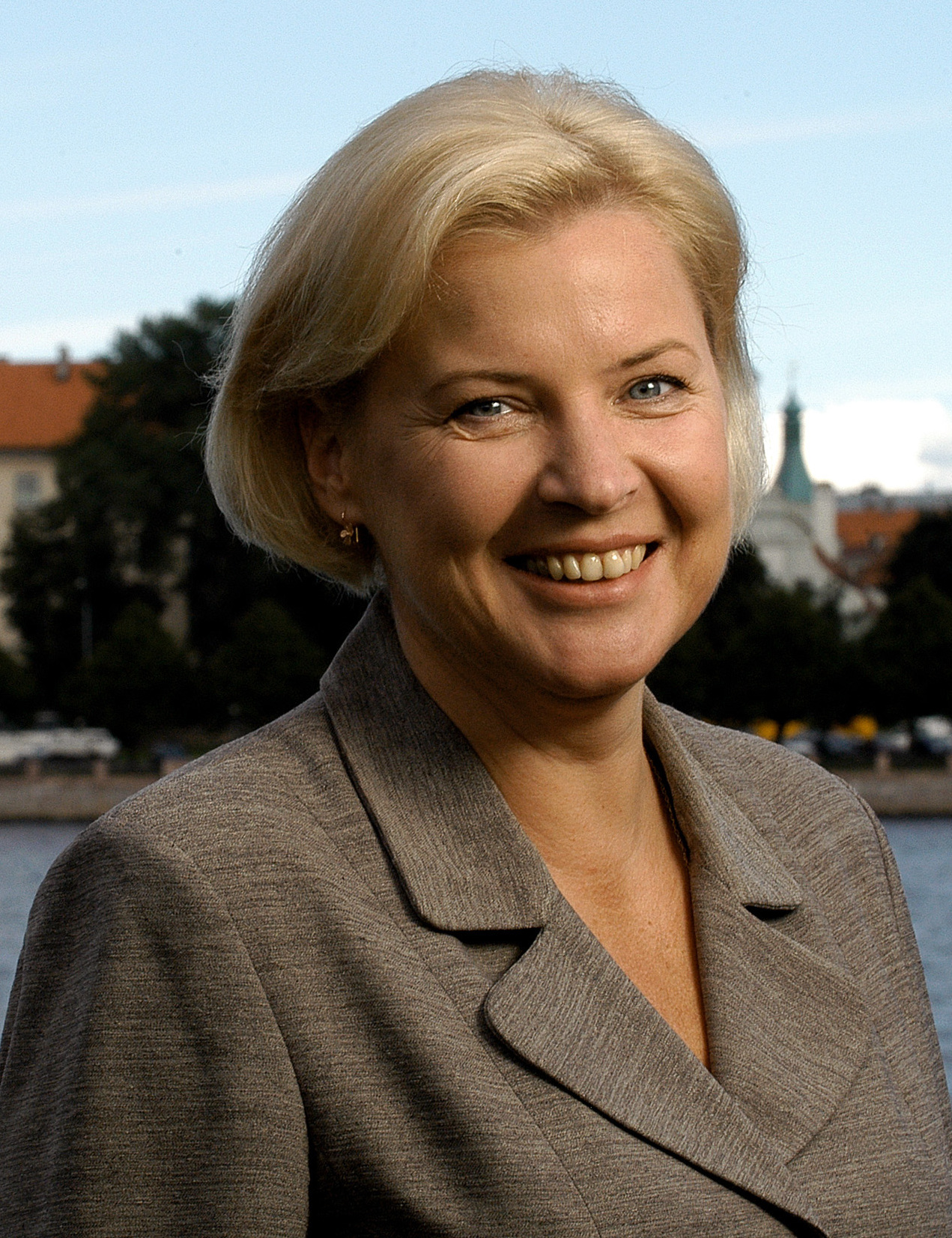
- Official portrait, 2004

Speaker of the Saeima
- In office 5 November 2002 – 7 November 2006
- Preceded by: Jānis Straume
- Succeeded by: Indulis Emsis

Personal details
- Born: 14 November 1958 Riga, Latvian SSR, Soviet Union (now Latvia)
- Died: 13 July 2024 (aged 65)
- Party: New Party (before 2002); Latvian Farmers' Union (2002–2024)
- Other political affiliations: Union of Greens and Farmers (2002–2024)

Ingrīda Latimira (née Ūdre; 14 November 1958 – 13 July 2024) was a Latvian politician who belonged to the Latvian Farmers' Union political party.

== Career ==
Ūdre was a former professional basketball player who worked as an accountant after the end of her basketball career. She was first elected to Saeima, the Latvian parliament, in 1998, from the list of the New Party. She was the presidential candidate of the New Party in 1999.

In 2002, after the New Party ceased to exist, Ūdre joined the Latvian Farmers' Union and became the leader of the newly founded Union of Greens and Farmers. After the 2002 parliamentary election, she became Speaker of the Saeima. She served in this position until the 2006 election.

In 2004, Ūdre was nominated as Latvia's candidate for European Commission. Her nomination caused a major controversy. Ūdre was a replacement for Latvia's previous commissioner Sandra Kalniete. Ūdre was also criticised, by Delna (the Latvian chapter of Transparency International) and other anti-corruption NGOs, for campaign finance violations committed by the Union of Farmers and Greens, although her personal involvement in those violations was never proven. In October 2004, Latvia withdrew Ūdre's candidacy, nominating Andris Piebalgs instead of her.

In 2006, Ūdre failed to win reelection to Saeima. Her party, the Union of Farmers and Greens increased its number of seats in the parliament from 12 to 18. Ūdre, however, received a large number of personal "against" votes (Latvian election system allows voters to cast "for" and "against" votes for individual candidates of the party they support) and was not reelected because of that.

Ūdre died on 13 July 2024, after long illness, at the age of 65.

Political offices
Preceded by Jānis Straume	Speaker of the Saeima; 2002–2006	Succeeded by Indulis Emsis
