= Prime Minister of Latvia =

Head of government

Prime Minister of the Republic of Latvia
- Latvijas Republikas Ministru prezidents
- Flag of the prime minister of Latvia

- Incumbent; Andris Kulbergs since 28 May 2026
- Government of Latvia
- Type: Head of government
- Member of: Government of Latvia; European Council; Saeima
- Appointer: President
- Term length: No term limit
- Inaugural holder: Kārlis Ulmanis
- Formation: 19 November 1918; 108 years ago
- Abolished: 1940–1991
- Salary: €53,601 annually

The prime minister of Latvia (Latvian: ministru prezidents) is the most powerful member of the Government of Latvia, who presides over the Latvian Cabinet of Ministers. The officeholder is nominated by the president of Latvia, but must be able to obtain the support of a parliamentary majority in the Saeima.

The tables below display all Latvian prime ministers from both the first period of Latvian independence (1918–1940) and since the country regained its independence (1990–present). From 1990 to 6 July 1993, the head of government was known as the chairman of the Council of Ministers.

A direct translation of the official Latvian term is minister-president. Although the equivalent is used in some European languages, it is not used conventionally in English.

== List ==
=== Republic of Latvia (1918–1940) ===
Political party:

Independent
Latvian Farmers' Union (LZS)
Union of Social Democrats – Mensheviks and Rural Workers (MP)
Democratic Centre (DC)
Progressive Association of New Farmers (PA)
New Farmers-Small Landowners Party (LJSP)

No.	Portrait	Name (Birth–Death)	Term of office			Political party	Cabinet	Saeima
No.	Portrait	Name (Birth–Death)	Took office	Left office	Tenure	Political party	Cabinet	Saeima
1^{[1]}		Kārlis Ulmanis (1877–1942)	18 November 1918	13 July 1919	2 years, 212 days	Latvian Farmers' Union	Provisional I LZS–LNP–DC–DS	People's; Council
1^{[1]}		Kārlis Ulmanis (1877–1942)	14 July 1919	8 December 1919	2 years, 212 days	Latvian Farmers' Union	Provisional II; LZS–LŽNP; DC joined later	People's; Council
1^{[1]}		Kārlis Ulmanis (1877–1942)	9 December 1919	11 June 1920	2 years, 212 days	Latvian Farmers' Union	Provisional III; LZS–LŽNP; DS joined later	People's; Council
1^{[1]}		Kārlis Ulmanis (1877–1942)	12 June 1920	18 June 1921	2 years, 212 days	Latvian Farmers' Union	Ulmanis I LZS–DS–LDP; DS exited later	Const. Assembly (1920)
2		Zigfrīds Anna Meierovics (1887–1925)	19 June 1921	19 July 1922	1 year, 221 days	Latvian Farmers' Union	Meierovics I LZS–DC–MP–LTP; LTP exited later	Const. Assembly (1920)
2		Zigfrīds Anna Meierovics (1887–1925)	20 July 1922	26 January 1923	1 year, 221 days	Latvian Farmers' Union	Meierovics II; LZS–MP–LDP	Const. Assembly (1920)
3		Jānis Pauļuks (1865–1937)	27 January 1923	27 June 1923	151 days	Independent	Pauļuks; LZS–LSPDS–DC–LJS–MP	1st (1922)
(2)		Zigfrīds Anna Meierovics (1887–1925)	28 June 1923	26 January 1924	212 days	Latvian Farmers' Union	Meierovics III; LZS–LSPDS–DC–LJS–MP	1st (1922)
4		Voldemārs Zāmuēls (1872–1948)	27 January 1924	18 December 1924	326 days	Independent	Zāmuēls; BNC–DC–LJS	1st (1922)
5		Hugo Celmiņš (1877–1941)	19 December 1924	23 December 1925	1 year, 4 days	Latvian Farmers' Union	Celmiņš I LZS–DC; MP and LJS joined later	1st (1922)
(1)		Kārlis Ulmanis (1877–1942)	24 December 1925	6 May 1926	133 days	Latvian Farmers' Union	Ulmanis II; LZS–LJSP–LJS–LZP; NA joined later	2nd (1925)
6		Arturs Alberings (1877–1934)	7 May 1926	18 December 1926	225 days	Latvian Farmers' Union	Alberings; LZS–DC–LJSP–LJS–LZP	2nd (1925)
7		Marģers Skujenieks (1886–1941)	19 December 1926	23 January 1928	1 year, 35 days	Menshevik	Skujenieks I LSDSP–MP–LPP–DC–LJS; DC exited cabinet	2nd (1925)
8		Pēteris Juraševskis (1872–1945)	24 January 1928	30 November 1928	311 days	Democratic Centre	Juraševskis; LZS–DC–LZP–VRP/DbRP	2nd (1925)
(5)		Hugo Celmiņš (1877–1941)	1 December 1928	26 March 1931	2 years, 115 days	Latvian Farmers' Union	Celmiņš II; LZS–DC–LJSP–LDZA–LA–KNP–VRP/DbRP; DC, KNP, VRP / DbRP exited cabinet	3rd (1928)
(1)		Kārlis Ulmanis (1877–1942)	27 March 1931	5 December 1931	253 days	Latvian Farmers' Union	Ulmanis III; LZS–LJSP–LDZA–NA–MKRA–LKZP–LPP	3rd (1928)
(7)		Marģers Skujenieks (1886–1941)	6 December 1931	23 March 1933	1 year, 107 days	Progressive Association of New Farmers	Skujenieks II; PA–DC–LZS–LZPA; LJSP joined later	4th (1931)
9		Ādolfs Bļodnieks (1889–1962)	24 March 1933	16 March 1934	357 days	Party of New Farmers and Smallholders	Bļodnieks; LJSP–LZS–DC–LZPA–PA–LKKP–KDP; DC, PA exited cabinet	4th (1931)
(1)^{[2]}		Kārlis Ulmanis (1877–1942)	17 March 1934	15 May 1934	6 years, 94 days	Latvian Farmers' Union	Ulmanis IV; LZS–KA–LKKP–LPP–KDP	4th (1931)
(1)^{[2]}		Kārlis Ulmanis (1877–1942)	15 May 1934	19 June 1940	6 years, 94 days	Independent	Ulmanis V Independent	
—^{[3]}		Augusts Kirhenšteins (1872–1963)	20 June 1940	25 August 1940	66 days	Independent (Pro-LKP)	Kirhenšteins; Independent–LKP	

=== Latvian Soviet Socialist Republic (1940–1990) ===
From 1940 to 1990, the Republic of Latvia was under occupation by the Soviet Union. In place of the internationally recognised republican institutions, the Soviet-installed Latvian Soviet Socialist Republic de-facto governed the country and implemented its own government structures.

Political party:

Communist Party of Latvia (LPK)

No.	Portrait	Name (Birth–Death)	Term of office			Political Party
No.	Portrait	Name (Birth–Death)	Took office	Left office	Tenure	Political Party
—		Vilis Lācis (1904–1966)	25 August 1940	27 November 1959	19 years, 94 days	Communist Party of Latvia
—		Jānis Peive (1906–1976)	27 November 1959	23 April 1962	2 years, 147 days	Communist Party of Latvia
—		Vitālijs Rubenis (1914–1994)	23 April 1962	5 May 1970	8 years, 12 days	Communist Party of Latvia
—		Jurijs Rubenis (1925–2004)	5 May 1970	6 October 1988	18 years, 154 days	Communist Party of Latvia
—		Vilnis Edvīns Bresis (1938–2017)	6 October 1988	7 May 1990	1 year, 213 days	Communist Party of Latvia

=== Republic of Latvia: 1990–present ===
From 4 May 1990 after adopting the Declaration of the Restoration of Independence of the Republic.

Political party:

Independent
Popular Front of Latvia (LTF)
Latvian Way (LC)
For Fatherland and Freedom/LNNK (TB/LNNK)
People's Party (TP)
New Era Party (JL)
Latvian Green Party (LZP)
Latvia's First Party/Latvian Way (LPP/LC)
Unity (V)
Liepāja Party (LP)
New Unity (JV)
United List (AS)

No.	Portrait	Name (Birth–Death)	Term of office			Political party	Cabinet	Saeima
No.	Portrait	Name (Birth–Death)	Took office	Left office	Tenure	Political party	Cabinet	Saeima
10		Ivars Godmanis (born 1951)	7 May 1990	3 August 1993	3 years, 88 days	Popular Front of Latvia	Godmanis I LTF; LC joined later	SC (1990)
11		Valdis Birkavs (born 1942)	3 August 1993	15 September 1994	1 year, 43 days	Latvian Way	Birkavs; LC–LZS–LZP	5th (1993)
12		Māris Gailis (born 1951)	15 September 1994	21 December 1995	1 year, 97 days	Latvian Way	Gailis; LC–TPA–LZS–LZP; TB joined later and exited cabinet	5th (1993)
13		Andris Šķēle (born 1958)	21 December 1995	13 February 1997	1 year, 229 days	Independent	Šķēle I DP'S'–TB–LC–LNNK–LZS–LZP–LVP	6th (1995)
13		Andris Šķēle (born 1958)	13 February 1997	7 August 1997	1 year, 229 days	Independent	Šķēle II; DP'S'–TB–LC–LNNK–LZS–LZP; KDS joined later	6th (1995)
14		Guntars Krasts (born 1957)	7 August 1997	26 November 1998	1 year, 111 days	For Fatherland and Freedom/LNNK	Krasts; TB/LNNK–LC–LZS–LZP–DPS–KTP; DPS and KTP exited cabinet	6th (1995)
15		Vilis Krištopans (born 1954)	26 November 1998	16 July 1999	232 days	Latvian Way	Krištopans; LC–TB/LNNK–JP; LSDSP joined later	7th (1998)
(13)		Andris Šķēle (born 1958)	16 July 1999	5 May 2000	294 days	People's Party	Šķēle III; TP–LC–TB/LNNK	7th (1998)
16		Andris Bērziņš (born 1951)	5 May 2000	7 November 2002	2 years, 186 days	Latvian Way	Bērziņš; LC–TP–TB/LNNK–JP	7th (1998)
17		Einars Repše (born 1961)	7 November 2002	9 March 2004	1 year, 123 days	New Era Party	Repše; JL–TB/LNNK–LZS–LPP–LZP; LPP exited cabinet	8th (2002)
18		Indulis Emsis (born 1952)	9 March 2004	2 December 2004	268 days	Latvian Green Party	Emsis; TP – LPP – LZS – LZP	8th (2002)
19		Aigars Kalvītis (born 1966)	2 December 2004	7 November 2006	3 years, 18 days	People's Party	Kalvītis I TP–JL–LZS–LPP–LZP; JL exited cabinet	8th (2002)
19		Aigars Kalvītis (born 1966)	7 November 2006	20 December 2007	3 years, 18 days	People's Party	Kalvītis II; TP–LZS–LPP–TB/LNNK–LZP–LC	9th (2006)
(10)		Ivars Godmanis (born 1951)	20 December 2007	12 March 2009	1 year, 82 days	Latvia's First Party/Latvian Way	Godmanis II; LPP/LC–TP–LZS–TB/LNNK–LZP	9th (2006)
20		Valdis Dombrovskis (born 1971)	12 March 2009	3 November 2010	4 years, 316 days	New Era Party	Dombrovskis I JL–TP–TB/LNNK–LZS–LZP–PS	9th (2006)
20		Valdis Dombrovskis (born 1971)	3 November 2010	25 October 2011	4 years, 316 days	New Era Party	Dombrovskis II; JL–PS–SCP–LZS–LZP–LP; JL, PS, SCP, LP later replaced by V	10th (2010)
20		Valdis Dombrovskis (born 1971)	25 October 2011	22 January 2014	4 years, 316 days	Unity	Dombrovskis III; V–ZRP–NA	11th (2011)
21		Laimdota Straujuma (born 1951)	22 January 2014	5 November 2014	2 years, 20 days	Unity	Straujuma I V–RP–NA–LZS–LZP	11th (2011)
21		Laimdota Straujuma (born 1951)	5 November 2014	11 February 2016	2 years, 20 days	Unity	Straujuma II; V–NA–LZS–LZP–LuV–LP	12th (2014)
22		Māris Kučinskis (born 1961)	11 February 2016	23 January 2019	2 years, 346 days	Liepāja Party	Kučinskis; V–NA–LZS–LZP–LuV–LP	12th (2014)
23		Krišjānis Kariņš (born 1964)	23 January 2019	14 December 2022	4 years, 235 days	New Unity	Kariņš I JV–JKP–KPV LV–A/P!–NA; KPV LV exited cabinet	13th (2018)
23		Krišjānis Kariņš (born 1964)	14 December 2022	15 September 2023	4 years, 235 days	New Unity	Kariņš II; JV–NA–AS	14th (2022)
24		Evika Siliņa (born 1975)	15 September 2023	28 May 2026	2 years, 255 days	New Unity	Siliņa; JV–ZZS–PRO; PRO exited cabinet	14th (2022)
25		Andris Kulbergs (born 1979)	28 May 2026	Incumbent	176 days	United List	Kulbergs I AS–JV–NA–ZZS	14th (2022)
25		Andris Kulbergs (born 1979)	28 May 2026	Incumbent	176 days	United List	Kulbergs II; AS–NA	15th (2026)

== Statistics ==
#	Prime Minister	Date of birth	Age at ascension (first term)	Time in office (total)	Age at retirement (last term)	Date of death	Longevity
1	Kārlis Ulmanis	September 4, 1877	41 years, 75 days	9 years, 334 days	62 years, 287 days	September 20, 1942	65 years, 16 days
2	Zigfrīds Meierovics	February 6, 1887	34 years, 133 days	2 years, 70 days	36 years, 354 days	August 22, 1925	38 years, 197 days
3	Jānis Pauļuks	November 12, 1865	57 years, 76 days	152 days	57 years, 228 days	June 21, 1937	71 years, 221 days
4	Voldemārs Zāmuēls	May 22, 1872	51 years, 250 days	327 days	52 years, 210 days	September 25, 1944	75 years, 239 days
5	Hugo Celmiņš	October 30, 1877	47 years, 50 days	3 years, 121 days	53 years, 147 days	July 30, 1941	63 years, 273 days
6	Arturs Alberings	January 8, 1876	50 years, 119 days	226 days	50 years, 345 days	April 26, 1934	58 years, 108 days
7	Marģers Skujenieks	June 22, 1886	40 years, 180 days	2 years, 145 days	46 years, 274 days	July 12, 1941	55 years, 20 days
8	Pēteris Juraševskis	March 23, 1872	55 years, 307 days	312 days	56 years, 252 days	January 10, 1945	72 years, 293 days
9	Ādolfs Bļodnieks	July 24, 1889	43 years, 243 days	358 days	44 years, 235 days	March 21, 1962	72 years, 240 days
—	Augusts Kirhenšteins ^{[3]}	September 18, 1872	67 years, 276 days	66 days	67 years, 342 days	November 11, 1963	91 years, 46 days
10	Ivars Godmanis	November 27, 1951	38 years, 161 days	4 years, 124 days	57 years, 105 days	Living	74 years, 358 days (living)
11	Valdis Birkavs	July 28, 1942	51 years, 6 days	1 year, 43 days	52 years, 49 days	Living	84 years, 115 days (living)
12	Māris Gailis	July 9, 1951	43 years, 37 days	1 year, 97 days	44 years, 165 days	Living	75 years, 134 days (living)
13	Andris Šķēle	January 16, 1958	37 years, 339 days	2 years, 159 days	42 years, 110 days	Living	68 years, 308 days (living)
14	Guntars Krasts	October 16, 1957	39 years, 295 days	1 year, 111 days	41 years, 51 days	Living	69 years, 35 days (living)
15	Vilis Krištopans	June 13, 1954	44 years, 166 days	232 days	45 years, 33 days	Living	72 years, 160 days (living)
16	Andris Bērziņš	August 4, 1951	48 years, 275 days	2 years, 186 days	51 years, 95 days	Living	75 years, 108 days (living)
17	Einars Repše	December 9, 1961	40 years, 333 days	1 year, 123 days	42 years, 91 days	Living	64 years, 346 days (living)
18	Indulis Emsis	January 2, 1952	52 years, 67 days	268 days	52 years, 335 days	Living	74 years, 322 days (living)
19	Aigars Kalvītis	June 27, 1966	38 years, 158 days	3 years, 18 days	42 years, 91 days	Living	60 years, 146 days (living)
20	Valdis Dombrovskis	August 5, 1971	37 years, 219 days	4 years, 316 days	42 years, 170 days	Living	55 years, 107 days (living)
21	Laimdota Straujuma	February 24, 1951	62 years, 332 days	2 years, 20 days	64 years, 352 days	Living	75 years, 269 days (living)
22	Māris Kučinskis	November 28, 1961	54 years, 75 days	2 years, 345 days	57 years, 56 days	Living	64 years, 357 days (living)
23	Krišjānis Kariņš	December 13, 1964	54 years, 41 days	4 years, 235 days	58 years, 276 days	Living	61 years, 342 days (living)
24	Evika Siliņa	August 3, 1975	48 years, 43 days	2 years, 255 days	50 years, 298 days	Living	51 years, 109 days (living)
25	Andris Kulbergs	May 26, 1979	47 years, 3 days	Incumbent		Living	47 years, 178 days (living)

== See also ==
- President of Latvia

== Notes ==
^{1} During the 1918–1920 Independence War, Latvia was contested by two other governments: the government of Soviet Latvia, led by Pēteris Stučka, and the government of Andrievs Niedra, backed by Baltic Germans. Some sources may list Stučka and Niedra as prime ministers for periods when their governments controlled most of Latvia.

^{2} On 15 May 1934, prime minister Ulmanis dissolved parliament and banned all political parties (including his own Farmer's Union), establishing authoritarian rule.

^{3} Puppet leader appointed by Soviet authorities. Not recognized as such by the Latvian government.
