= Vaira Vīķe-Freiberga =

6th President of Latvia

Vaira Vīķe-Freiberga GCB OC OQ
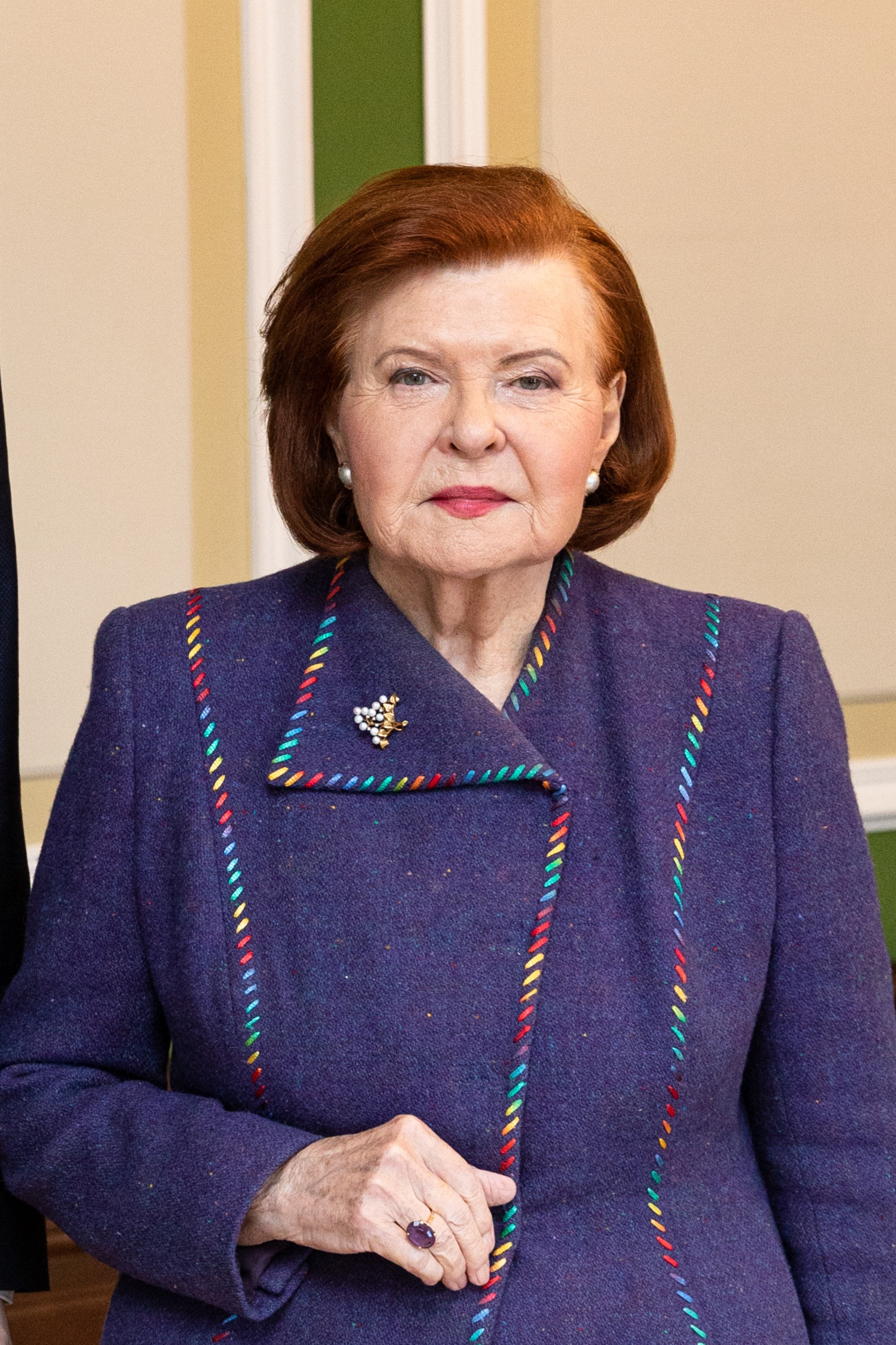
- Vike-Freiberga in 2022

6th President of Latvia
- In office 8 July 1999 – 8 July 2007
- Prime Minister: Vilis Krištopans; Andris Šķēle; Andris Bērziņš; Einars Repše; Indulis Emsis; Aigars Kalvītis
- Preceded by: Guntis Ulmanis
- Succeeded by: Valdis Zatlers

Personal details
- Born: Vaira Vīķe; 1 December 1937 (age 88) Riga, Latvia
- Party: Independent
- Spouse: Imants Freibergs (m. 1960; died 2026)
- Children: 2
- Education: University of Toronto; McGill University

Vaira Vīķe-Freiberga GCB OC OQ (née Vīķe; born 1 December 1937) is a Latvian politician who served as the sixth president of Latvia from 1999 to 2007. She is the first and to date only woman to hold the post and the most recent to be re-elected for a second term.

Freiberga is a professor and interdisciplinary scholar, having published eleven books and numerous articles, essays and book chapters in addition to her extensive speaking engagements. As President of the Republic of Latvia 1999–2007, she was instrumental in achieving membership in the European Union and NATO for her country. She is active in international politics, was named Special Envoy to the Secretary General on United Nations reform and was official candidate for UN Secretary General in 2006.

She remains active in the international arena and continues to speak in defense of liberty, equality and social justice, and for the need of Europe to acknowledge the whole of its history. She is a well-known pro-European, as such, in December 2007 she was named vice-chair of the Reflection group on the long-term future of the European Union. She is also known for her work in psycholinguistics, semiotics and analysis of the oral literature of her native country.

After her presidency, Vīķe-Freiberga served as a founding co-chair of the Nizami Ganjavi International Center and as the president of Club of Madrid, the world's largest forum of former heads of state and government, from 2014 to 2020. She is also a Fellow of the World Academy of Art and Science and a member of the International Programme Board of the Prague European Summit.

== Early life and education ==
Vaira Vīķe was born in Riga, Latvia. At the end of 1944, as the second Soviet occupation of Latvia began, her parents escaped to Nazi Germany. There she received her first education in Latvian primary school at a displaced persons camp in Lübeck, Germany, where her baby sister died. Then her family moved to Casablanca in French Morocco in 1949. There, she learnt French at a primary school at the Daourat hydroelectric dam village. She then went on to attend Collège de jeunes filles de Mers-Sultan in Casablanca. In 1954 her family moved to Toronto, Ontario, Canada, where she completed high school.

Vīķe attended Victoria College of the University of Toronto, graduating with a Bachelor of Arts in 1958 and a Master of Arts in 1960, in psychology. She worked at the Canadian Imperial Bank of Commerce as a teller and part-time as a supervisor in Branksome Hall Boarding School for Girls. In 1958, being fluent in English, French, Latvian, Spanish and German, she worked as a translator and the next year went on to work as a Spanish teacher for grades 12 and 13 at Ontario Ladies' College. Upon completion of her master's degree, Vīķe became a clinical psychologist at the Toronto Psychiatric Hospital in late 1960. She left in 1961 to resume her education at McGill University in Montreal while also lecturing part-time at Concordia University. She earned her PhD in psychology from McGill University in 1965 with a dissertation supervised by Dr. Virginia Douglas, entitled Concept Learning in Normal and Hyperactive Children.

== Professional life ==
From 1965 to 1998, Vīķe-Freiberga pursued a professorial career at the Department of Psychology of the French-speaking University of Montreal, where she taught psychopharmacology, psycholinguistics, scientific theories, experimental methods, language and cognitive processes. Her experimental research focused on memory processes and language, and the influence of drugs on cognitive processes. At the same time she did scholarly research on semiotics, poetics and the structural analysis of computer-accessible texts from an oral tradition—the tradition of Latvian folksongs. During this period she authored ten books and about 160 articles, essays, and book chapters; gave over 250 speeches, allocutions, and scientific communications in English, French, and Latvian; and gave numerous radio, TV, and press interviews in various languages.

During that period Vīķe-Freiberga held prominent positions in national and international scientific and scholarly organizations, as well as in a number of Canadian governmental, institutional, academic and interdisciplinary committees, where she acquired extensive administrative experience. She is the recipient of many medals, prizes and honours for distinguished work in the humanities and social sciences.

In June 1998 she was elected professor emerita at the University of Montreal and returned to her native land, Latvia, after a 54-year absence. On 19 October, the prime minister named her director of the newly founded Latvian Institute.

== President of Latvia ==
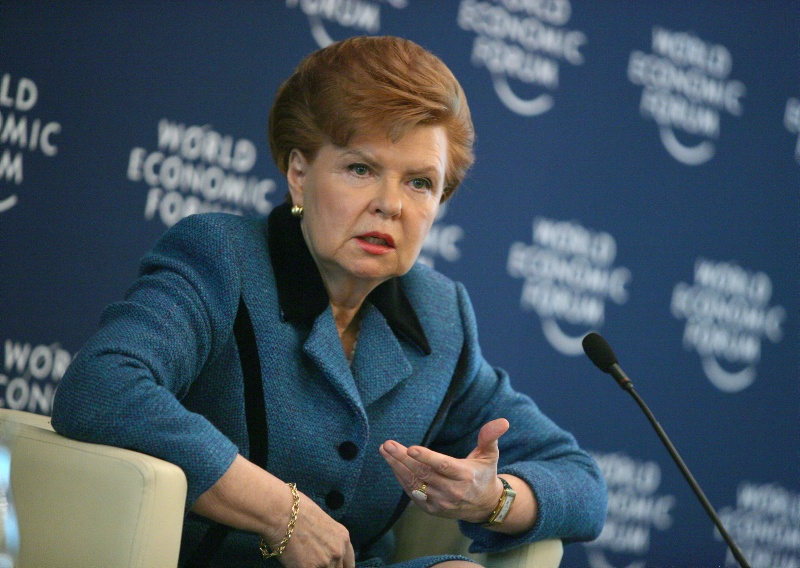
Vīķe-Freiberga at the 2007 World Economic Forum

Vīķe-Freiberga became president of Latvia in 1999. Although not a candidate on the first ballot, she was drafted by the Saeima (Latvian Parliament) and was elected to the office of president of Latvia on 20 June. She was sworn in on 8 July. Her approval rating ranged between 70% and 85%, and in 2003 she was re-elected for a second term of four years with 88 votes out of 96.

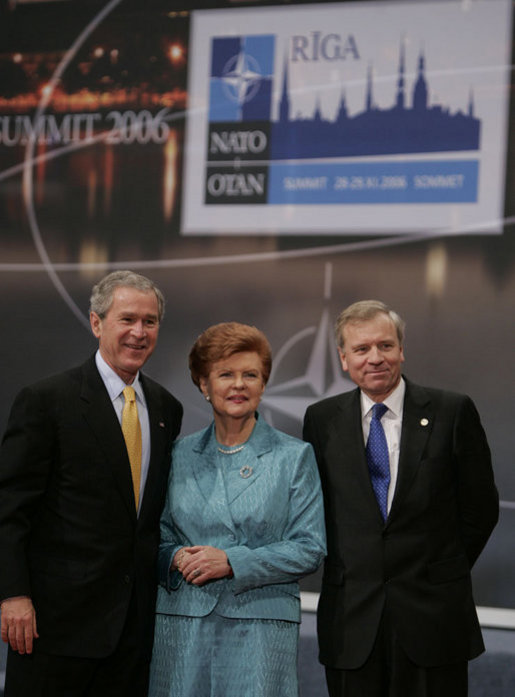
Vīķe-Freiberga with U.S. President George W. Bush and NATO Secretary General Jaap de Hoop Scheffer, at the NATO Summit in Riga 2006

She actively exercised the powers conferred on the president by the Constitution of the Republic of Latvia. She also played a leading role in achieving Latvia's membership in NATO and the European Union. She was an invited speaker at numerous international events (such as the joint session of the United States Congress, in June 2006), as well as an outspoken pundit on social issues, moral values, European historical dialogue, and democracy. During her presidency she regularly visited towns and villages to meet her constituents in person, and received many thousands of letters yearly from Latvians.

In April 2005, the United Nations Secretary-General Kofi Annan named Vīķe-Freiberga as a member of his team of global political leaders helping to promote his comprehensive reform agenda. In September 2006, the three Baltic States officially announced her candidacy for the post of United Nations Secretary-General.

== Post-presidency ==
Since the end of her presidency in July 2007, Vīķe-Freiberga has actively participated as an invited speaker at a wide variety of international events. She is a founding member and former president of the Club of Madrid, a member of the European Council on Foreign Relations, and an honorary patron of several Foundations. She was a member of the Support Committee of the 2007 European Book Prize and an honorary patron of the Paris Colloquium on the Teaching of European literatures. On 14 December 2007 she was appointed vice-president of the Reflection Group on the long-term future of the European Union. In 2008, she became a member of the European Council on Tolerance and Reconciliation. During the spring semester of 2008 she was an invited Senior Fellow at the Institute of Politics, John F. Kennedy School of Government, Harvard University. She was chair of the European Research Area Board Identification Committee (2008), and chair of the Review panel of the European Research Council (2009). Vīķe-Freiberga was also appointed to the advisory board of the European Association of History Educators (EUROCLIO). In October 2011, she was made chair of the European Commission High Level Expert Group on Media Freedom.

She was a candidate for the first permanent president of the European Council. Herman Van Rompuy was eventually chosen for that position. Vīķe-Freiberga has said that under the Lisbon Treaty and beyond, a federal Europe is desirable.

Vīķe-Freiberga is a member of:

- the InterAction Council of Former Heads of State and Government, focused on three main priority areas: peace and security, world economic revitalization and universal ethical standards.
- the Global Leadership Foundation, an organization which works to support democratic leadership, prevent and resolve conflict through mediation and promote good governance in the form of democratic institutions, open markets, human rights and the rule of law. It does so by making available, discreetly and in confidence, the experience of former leaders to today's national leaders. It is a not-for-profit organization composed of former heads of government, senior governmental and international organization officials who work closely with Heads of Government on governance-related issues of concern to them.
- the Fondation Chirac's honour committee, ever since the foundation was launched in 2008 by former French president Jacques Chirac in order to promote world peace. She also participates as jury member for the Prize for Conflict Prevention awarded every year by this foundation.
- the Leadership Council for Concordia, a nonpartisan, nonprofit based in New York City focused on promoting effective public-private collaboration to create a more prosperous and sustainable future.
- the Board of Thinkers of the Boston Global Forum.
- the advisory board of the Prague European Summit.

== Medals and honors ==
Vīķe-Freiberga has received many medals and awards, including the Golden Plate Award of the American Academy of Achievement in 2000, presented by Awards Council member General Joseph W. Ralston, USAF, Supreme Allied Commander Europe, at an awards ceremony at Hampton Court Palace, the 2005 Hannah Arendt Prize for political thought, the 2007 Emperor Otto Prize Prize for contributions in defining European identity and future, and the 2009 Friedrich-August-von-Hayek-Stiftung for promotion of freedom and free trade. She has been awarded 37 Orders of Merit and 16 Honorary Doctorates. She is a member of the Latvian Academy of Sciences, a fellow of the World Academy of Art and Science, a fellow of the Royal Society of Canada and an associate member of the Royal Academy of Belgium. In 2013, she received the Knight of Freedom Award.

Coat of arms as dame of the collar of the Order of Isabella the Catholic

=== National honours ===
- Latvia: Commander Grand Cross with Chain of the Order of Three Stars (8 July 1999)
- Latvia: Grand Cross of the Order of Viesturs (2007)
- Latvia: 1st Class of the Cross of Recognition (2007)

=== Foreign honours ===
- Azerbaijan: Recipient of the Dostlug Order (2015)
- Belgium: Grand Cordon of the Order of Leopold (2007)
- Canada:
  - Honorary Officer of the National Order of Quebec (2006)
  - Honorary Officer of the Order of Canada (2024)
- Estonia:
  - Collar of the Order of the Cross of Terra Mariana (2000)
  - Collar of the Order of the White Star (2005)
- Finland: Grand Cross with Collar of the Order of the White Rose of Finland (2001)
- Germany: Grand Cross Special Class of the Order of Merit of the Federal Republic of Germany (2003)
- Italy: Knight Grand Cross with Collar of the Order of Merit of the Italian Republic (2004)
- Japan: Grand Cordon of the Order of the Chrysanthemum (2007)
- Lithuania: Grand Cross of the Order of Vytautas the Great (2001)
- Luxembourg: Grand Cross of the Order of Adolphe of Nassau (2006)
- Poland:
  - Knight of the Order of the White Eagle (2003)
  - First Class of the Order of Merit of the Republic of Poland (2005)
- Portugal: Grand Collar of the Order of Prince Henry (12 August 2003)
- Norway: Grand Cross of the Order of St. Olav (2000)
- Spain: Collar of the Order of Isabella the Catholic (2004)
- Sweden: Member of the Royal Order of the Seraphim (2005)
- United Kingdom: Honorary Dame Grand Cross of the Most Honourable Order of the Bath (2006)

=== Awards ===
- Global Women's Leadership Award, Global Summit of Women (Berlin, Germany, 2007)
- Truman-Reagan Medal of Freedom (2011)
- Hans J. Morgenthau Award, National Committee on American Foreign Policy (New York, 2024)
- Rober F. Kennedy Human Rights Award (New York, 2024)
- Lifetime of Leadership Award, Vital Voices Global Partnership and Council of Women World Leaders

=== Other recognition ===
Four biographies about Vīķe-Freiberga have been published (in Latvian, English, French, Finnish, Italian, Russian and Spanish), and a full-length documentary film, The Threefold Sun, was released in 2008.

== Family and personal life ==
Vīķe-Freiberga was married to Imants Freibergs, formerly a professor of computer sciences at the University of Quebec at Montreal. He was the President of the Latvian Information and Communications Technology Association (LIKTA) while his wife was President of Latvia. The couple met at the Latvian Students Club in Toronto. They have two children, Kārlis and Indra. He died on 1 January 2026 at the age of 91.

Vīķe-Freiberga and Freibergs founded the company VVF Consulting, which offers consulting services to public and private organizations.

== Selected works ==
- Vikis-Freibergs, Vaira, ed. (1989). Linguistics and Poetics of Latvian Folk Songs: Essays in Honour of the Sesquicentennial of the Birth of Kr. Barons. McGill–Queen's Studies in Ethnic History 4. Kingston, Ont.: McGill–Queen's University Press. ISBN 978-0-7735-0661-9. OCLC 22859230.
- Vike-Freiberga, Vaira (2000). Latvia's Place in a New Europe. European Essay 13. London: Federal Trust for Education and Research. ISBN 978-1-903403-26-6. OCLC 45682632.
- Melngailis, Emīlis (2005). Vīķe-Freiberga, Vaira (ed.). Saules balsi: Latvian Sun Song Melodies (in Latvian and English). Riga: Karogs. ISBN 978-9984-505-82-4. OCLC 68609088.

== See also ==
- List of presidents of Latvia

Political offices
Preceded by Guntis Ulmanis	President of Latvia; 1999–2007	Succeeded by Valdis Zatlers
Diplomatic posts
Preceded by Wim Kok	President of the Club of Madrid; 2014–2019	Succeeded by Danilo Türk
