= Political Union of Economists =

Former Latvian political party

The Political Union of Economists (Latvian: Tautsaimnieku politiskā apvienība), abbreviated to TPA, was a centre-left political party in Latvia during the 1990s. It was strongly pro-economic liberalisation. It was founded in February 1994, and was led by Edvīns Kibe.

The party was founded as an eight-deputy split from Harmony for Latvia after the 1993 election; the other part became the left-wing National Harmony Party. The TPA joined the coalition government led by Māris Gailis in September 1994, after Latvian Way refused to increase agricultural tariffs. In the 1995 election, the party won 1.5% of the vote: failing to cross the 5% election threshold to win any seats.
