= New Party (Latvia) =

New Party Jaunā partija
- Abbreviation: JP
- Leader: Guntis Dišlers (last)
- Founder: Raimonds Pauls
- Founded: 1997 (New Party); 2001 (New Christian Party)
- Dissolved: May 2002
- Succeeded by: Latvia's First Party
- Ideology: Christian democracy
- Political position: Centre to centre-right
- Colours: Navy blue, yellow

The New Party (Latvian: Jaunā partija, JP) was a centrist political party in Latvia. Formed by composer Raimonds Pauls, the party won eight seats in the Saeima at the 1998 election on the back of Pauls's popularity. After the election, the JP entered into a minority government with Latvian Way and For Fatherland and Freedom/LNNK.

In the June 1999 presidential election, the party nominated Pauls for the presidency, and Pauls came first after five ballots, but withdrew his candidacy, as he still couldn't receive more than a third of the votes. The party dropped out of the governing coalition the following month, when it was replaced by the People's Party under new PM Andris Šķēle. In May 2000, it entered the centre-right governing coalition. However, Pauls left the party to become an independent MP in August 2000, leading to its influence declining. The party dissolved after Pauls's departure, with a third of its MPs joining the new Latvia's First Party.

== Citations and references ==
=== Cited sources ===
- Berglund, Sten; Ekman, Joakim; Aarebrot, Frank H. (2004). The Handbook of Political Change in Eastern Europe. Edward Elgar Publishing. ISBN 978-1-84064-854-6.
