= Andris Bērziņš (prime minister) =

Latvian politician

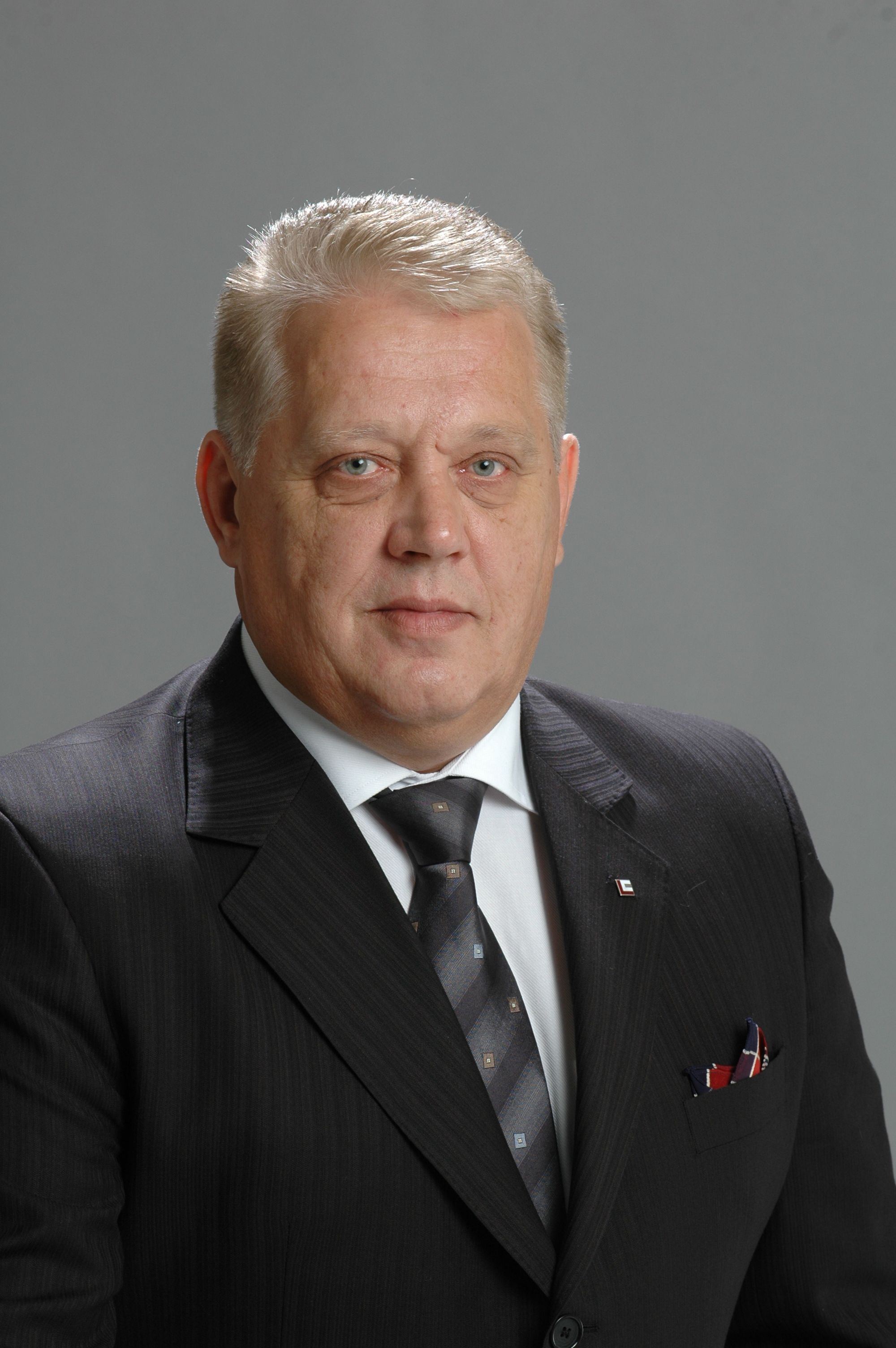
- Bērziņš in 2004

16th Prime Minister of Latvia
- In office 5 May 2000 – 7 November 2002
- President: Vaira Vīķe Freiberga
- Preceded by: Andris Šķēle
- Succeeded by: Einars Repše

3rd Mayor of Riga
- In office 9 March 1997 – 5 May 2000
- Preceded by: Māris Purgailis
- Succeeded by: Andris Ārgalis

Minister of Welfare of Latvia
- In office 19 September 1994 – 21 December 1995
- Prime Minister: Māris Gailis

Personal details
- Born: 4 August 1951 (age 75) Rīga, Latvian SSR
- Party: Latvian Way
- Spouse: Daina Bērziņa
- Education: University of Latvia
- Profession: History teacher

Andris Bērziņš (born 4 August 1951) is a Latvian politician born in Riga. He served as Prime Minister of Latvia from 5 May 2000 to 7 November 2002. He is a member of the Latvian Way political party.

== Career ==
He served as minister of labor from 1993 to 1994, deputy prime minister and minister of welfare from 1994 to 1995, and mayor of Riga from 1997 to 2000.

Andris Bērziņš is an Honorary Member of The International Raoul Wallenberg Foundation.

Political offices
Preceded by Māris Purgailis	Mayor of Riga; 1997–2000	Succeeded by Andris Ārgalis
Preceded by Andris Šķēle	Prime Minister of Latvia; May 5, 2000 – November 7, 2002	Succeeded by Einars Repše
