= Einars Repše =

Latvian politician

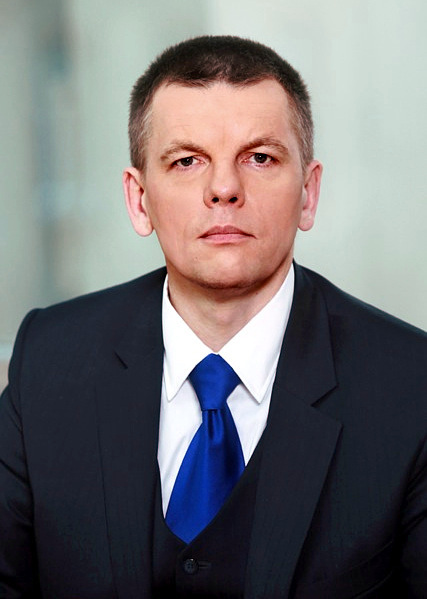
- Repše in 2013

17th Prime Minister of Latvia
- In office 7 November 2002 – 9 March 2004
- President: Vaira Vīķe-Freiberga
- Deputy: Ainārs Šlesers
- Preceded by: Andris Bērziņš
- Succeeded by: Indulis Emsis

Minister of Finance
- In office 12 March 2009 – 3 November 2010
- President: Valdis Zatlers
- Prime Minister: Valdis Dombrovskis
- Preceded by: Atis Slakteris
- Succeeded by: Andris Vilks

Personal details
- Born: 9 December 1961 (age 64) Jelgava, Latvian Soviet Socialist Republic
- Party: LNNK (1988-1991); New Era (2002-2011); Unity (2011-2013); For Latvia's Development (2013–present)
- Education: University of Latvia

Einars Repše (born 9 December 1961) is a Latvian physicist, financier and politician, chairman of the Association for Latvian Development.

== Early life ==
Einars Repše graduated from Latvia State University (now known as University of Latvia) in 1986 with a degree in physics (specialisation – radio electronics). He first entered politics in 1988 as one of the founders of the Latvian National Independence Movement (LNNK), a political organization promoting Latvia's independence from the Soviet Union. He was elected to the parliament of Latvia in 1990.

== Career ==
=== 1990s ===
From 1991 to 2001, Repše was the president of the Bank of Latvia (Latvia's central bank). During this period, he oversaw the introduction of the Latvian rouble, Latvia's temporary transitional currency and the Lats, independent Latvia's new currency. Under Repše, the Bank of Latvia pursued a tight monetary policy, implementing a de facto currency board for the Lats. As a result, the exchange rate of the lat has been stable since the early 1990s till now. Inflation was brought down from almost 1000% initially to low single digits within a few years. The success of the Lats made Repše very popular in Latvia.

=== 2000s ===
In 2001, Repše resigned from the Bank of Latvia to return to politics. He founded the New Era Party, a Populist anti-corruption party. After the 2002 elections, Repše became the Prime Minister of Latvia in November 2002. He led a coalition of his own New Era Party, the Latvia's First Party, the Union of Greens and Farmers and For Fatherland and Freedom/LNNK. Repše's government became known for an outspoken fight against corruption and tax evasion. Several high-ranked government officials, including the head of Latvia's state revenue service, were fired or resigned. The anti-corruption measures resulted in some success, as the revenues from the gasoline tax, previously notorious for tax evasion, increased by 30% in one year. The revenues from other taxes, however, were not significantly different, compared to the previous governments, and some of the anti-corruption measures backfired (for example, some of the fired officials successfully sued the Latvian government for wrongful dismissal). Repše's government also implemented a tight control on budget expenses, reducing the budget deficit from 3% of GDP in 2002 to 1.8% in 2003.

Starting in September 2003, a conflict between Repše and the Latvia First Party, one of his coalition partners, became apparent. Repše blamed the conflict on vested interests resisting his anti-corruption plans. The coalition partners mentioned Repše's authoritarian management style and unofficially delegating many of his powers as prime minister to his chief of staff Dans Titavs as the main reason for the conflict. Repše's government became a minority administration in January 2004 after the Latvia First Party left the government. He and his cabinet resigned in February 2004. After being in opposition during Indulis Emsis government, the New Era Party joined the Aigars Kalvītis coalition government in December 2004, with Repše becoming the minister of defence. During his service, however, he at times was portrayed by the press as more involved in his hobbies and business, than in governmental activities, losing popularity among the electorate.

In 2003, Repše bought real estate at various locations in rural Latvia for a total of 323 718 lats (approx. 500 000 euros). His real estate purchases were funded by loans from two Latvian banks, Hansabanka and Nord/LB Latvia. Repše's opponents immediately questioned his real estate deals, claiming that Repše has used his position to obtain loans on conditions better than those available to the general public. His deals were investigated by a special committee of the Latvian parliament. In December 2005, a criminal probe was started by the Corruption Prevention and Combating Bureau (KNAB). Due to this investigation, Repše resigned from his position as the minister of defence, even though he was never officially declared a suspect under the case. On 12 October 2007 KNAB closed the criminal probe – no wrongdoing was discovered.

Repše's real estate deals, confrontational management style and somewhat flamboyant lifestyle led to a major decline in his popularity. In 1999 and 2000, Repše was one of the most trusted politicians in Latvia, with 75%–80% Latvians having a positive opinion of him. By the time of his resignation in 2005, he was the least popular minister in the Latvian government.

Repše was Minister of Finance of Latvia from 12 March 2009 to 3 November 2010, during the toughest time right after the world credit crisis. He brought down the deficits ruthlessly, put the state finances in order, and paved the way for Latvia to join the euro which was accomplished during the next government.

=== 2010s ===
In 2013 Repše returned to active politics and founded society, later transformed into political party "For Latvia's Development". After unsuccessful parliamentary elections in October 2014, Repše completely retired from politics.

== Personal life ==
As to his hobbies, he is known to be interested in flying, aircraft building, painting and mountaineering.

Political offices
Preceded by Andris Bērziņš	Prime Minister of Latvia; 7 November 2002 – 9 March 2004	Succeeded by Indulis Emsis
