= Vilis Krištopans =

Prime Minister of Latvia

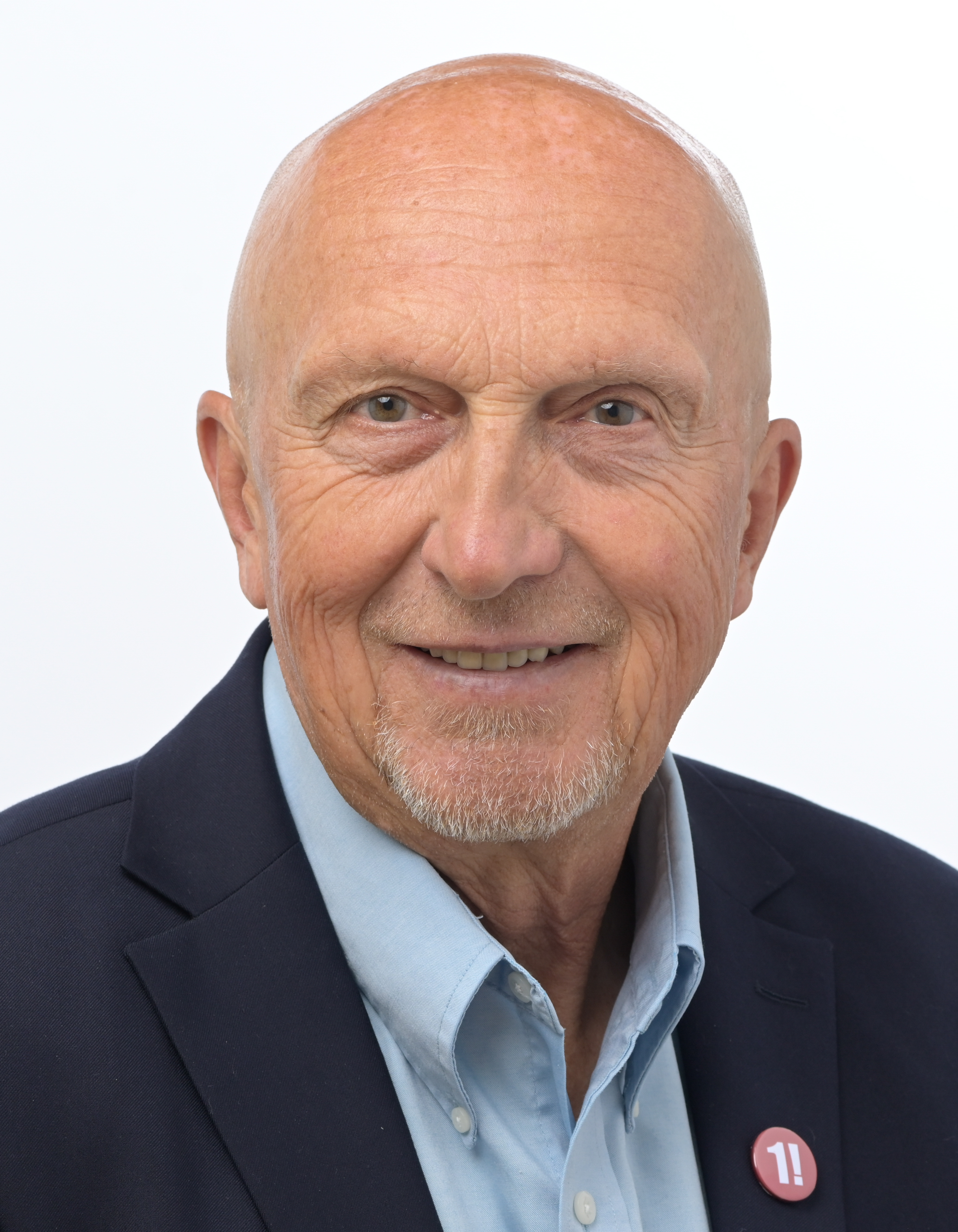

Member of the European Parliament for Latvia
- Incumbent
- Assumed office 16 July 2024

Member of the Saeima
- In office 1 November 2022 – 16 July 2024
- In office 5 November 2002 – 7 November 2007
- In office 6 July 1993 – 16 July 1999

15th Prime Minister of Latvia
- In office 26 November 1998 – 16 July 1999
- President: Guntis Ulmanis; Vaira Vīķe-Freiberga
- Preceded by: Guntars Krasts
- Succeeded by: Andris Šķēle

Personal details
- Born: 13 June 1954 (age 71) Omsk Oblast, Russian SFSR, Soviet Union
- Party: LPV (2021–present)
- Other political affiliations: CPSU (1980–1987); LC (1993–2002); ZZS (2002–2007)
- Spouse: Aija Krištopane
- Children: 3
- Education: Riga Technical University

Vilis Krištopans (born 13 June 1954) is a Latvian politician who served as the prime minister of Latvia from 26 November 1998 to 15 July 1999.

As a prime minister he was a member of the Latvian Way political party. He then left politics and, in 2002, returned as a member of parliament from the Union of Greens and Farmers. Prior to being prime minister, he was the minister of transport.

== See also ==
- Krištopans cabinet

Political offices
Preceded by Guntars Krasts	Prime Minister of Latvia; November 26, 1998 – July 16, 1999	Succeeded by Andris Šķēle
