= Guntars Krasts =

Latvian politician (born 1957)

- Krasts in 1997

14th Prime Minister of Latvia
- In office 7 August 1997 – 26 November 1998
- President: Guntis Ulmanis
- Preceded by: Andris Šķēle
- Succeeded by: Vilis Krištopans

Minister of the Economy
- In office 21 December 1995 – 7 August 1997
- Prime Minister: Andris Šķēle
- Preceded by: Jānis Zvanītājs
- Succeeded by: Atis Sausnītis

Member of the European Parliament for Latvia
- In office 2004–2009

Personal details
- Born: 16 October 1957 (age 69) Riga, Latvian Soviet Socialist Republic
- Party: For Fatherland and Freedom/LNNK (until 2008); Libertas Latvia (2008–2010); Latvian Association of Regions (since 2018)
- Education: University of Latvia

Guntars Krasts (born 16 October 1957) is a Latvian politician, former Prime Minister, and former Member of the European Parliament for the single Latvia constituency. Born in Riga, he was the Minister of Economy of Latvia from December 1995 to August 1997, Prime Minister of Latvia from August 1997 to November 1998, and the Deputy Prime Minister from November 1998 to June 1999. Krasts was a member of Saeima, the Latvian parliament, from June 1999 until being elected to the European Parliament in 2004.

== Guntars Krasts in the European institutions ==
Guntars Krasts was elected in the 2004 Euroelections as MEP for the single Latvia constituency as a member of For Fatherland and Freedom/LNNK. He sits with the Union for a Europe of Nations group (UEN). He left For Fatherland and Freedom/LNNK in February 2008 but joined no other party. As of 31 March 2009, his European Parliament profile shows no national party membership.

On 28 March 2008, Libertas Latvia gave a press conference in which Krasts was named as the head of the Libertas Latvia list. The list would total eight candidates to contend the nine seats assigned to the single Latvia constituency. In the EP elections of 2009, the Libertas.lv list fell short of entering parliament, receiving 4,3% of the vote.

== Later activities ==
After the elections, Krasts distanced himself from politics, working in a United Nations and European Union project in Moldova as a government advisor for state reform and EU integration for the Government of Moldova. In 2018, it was announced that he had joined the Latvian Association of Regions.

== See also ==
- Krasts cabinet

Political offices
Preceded by Andris Šķēle	Prime Minister of Latvia; 7 August 1997 – 26 November 1998	Succeeded by Vilis Krištopans
