= Andris Šķēle =

Latvian politician and businessman

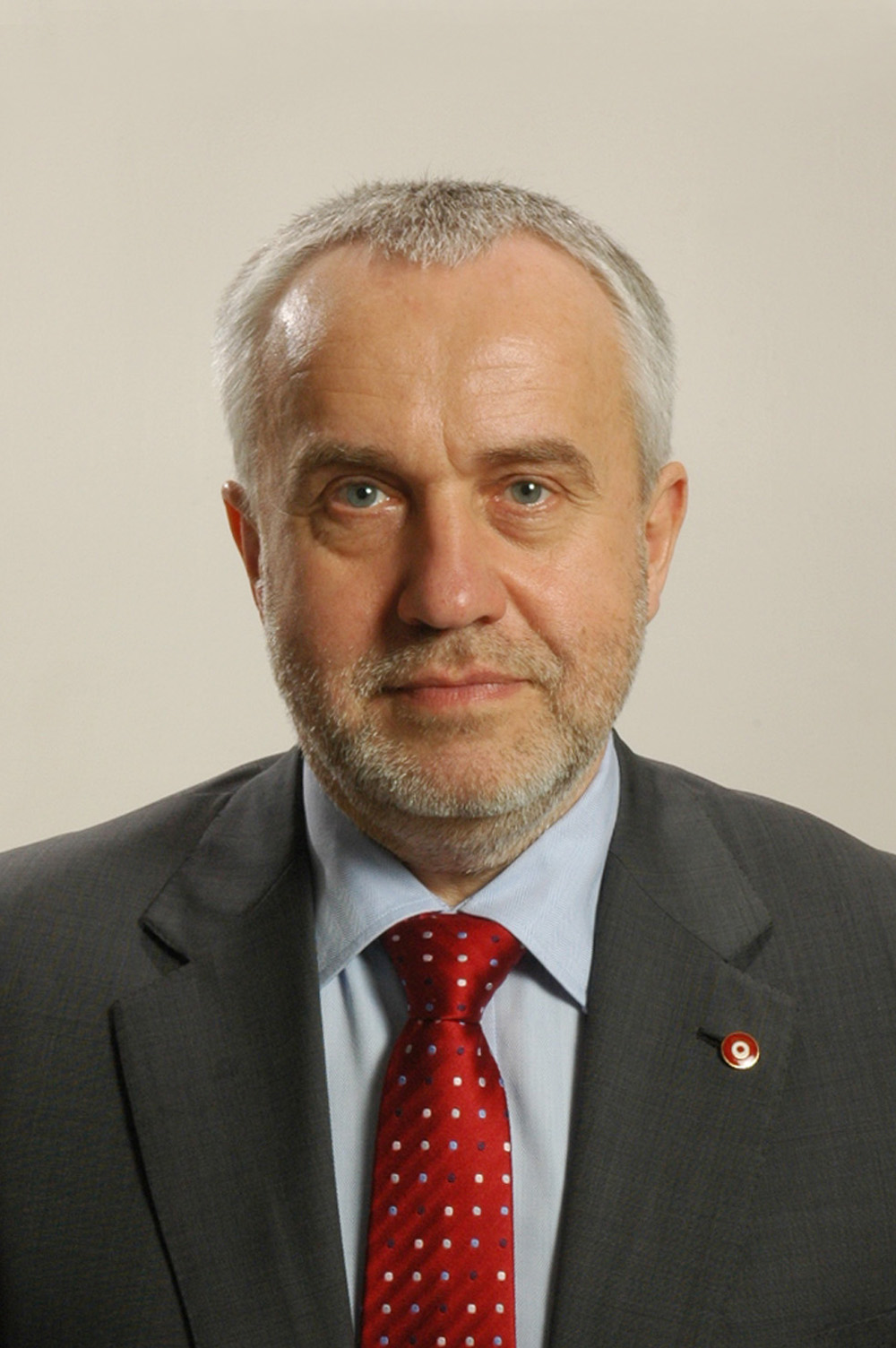
- Šķēle in 2010

13th Prime Minister of Latvia
- In office 16 July 1999 – 5 May 2000
- President: Guntis Ulmanis; Vaira Vīķe-Freiberga
- Preceded by: Vilis Krištopans
- Succeeded by: Andris Bērziņš
- In office 21 December 1995 – 6 August 1997
- President: Guntis Ulmanis
- Preceded by: Māris Gailis
- Succeeded by: Guntars Krasts

Personal details
- Born: 16 January 1958 (age 68) Ape, Latvia
- Party: People's Party (1998–2011)
- Education: Latvia University of Life Sciences and Technologies

Andris Šķēle (born 16 January 1958) is a Latvian former politician and business oligarch. He served two terms as Prime Minister of Latvia from 1995 to 1997, and again from 1999 to 2000.

== Early life ==
Šķēle graduated from the Latvian Agriculture Academy. He began to work in the Government in 1990 when he became the first secretary for the Ministry of Agriculture. In 1993 Šķēle briefly became the acting Minister of Agriculture. In 1994, he was assigned by then Prime Minister to create Latvia's Privatization Agency, while becoming the acting General Director of it.

During this time, he was not in active politics and was able to pursue the leadership role of several key Latvian businesses. He was Chairman of the Supervisory Board of the Latvian Shipping Company, as well as Supervisory Board member in Unibanka. He was also Chairman of the Supervisory Board of the Avelat Group, which was one of the largest manufacturing and retailing groups in Latvia. In the following years, Šķēle took part in a management buyout of the Avelat group and became the single owner of it. However, he was forced to sell it later to avoid a conflict of interest while in active politics.

== Prime minister ==
In 1995, after the parliamentary elections of 6th Saeima, when political parties were incapable of creating a coalition government, Šķēle was presented as an independent candidate for the position of Prime Minister. The cabinet was approved on 21 September 1995, and governed until 7 August 1997. During Šķēle's leadership, the government focused on a wide-scale privatization program, liberalization of land ownership laws and maintaining a balanced budget. Šķēle was considered among the most popular Latvian politicians at the time.

== People's Party ==
In 1998, before the parliamentary elections of 7th Saeima, Andris Šķēle founded the People's Party. It positioned itself as a conservative party and was able to win the elections, receiving 24 out of 100 seats in the parliament. However other political parties created a grand coalition and left the People's Party in the opposition. It was a year later when the government of Vilis Krištopans fell and Šķēle was able to form a new government. Šķēle once again became Prime Minister from 16 July 1999 to 5 May 2000. During this time, the government began talks of Latvia joining the EU and NATO which was achieved in a mere 4 years time.

In 2002, after the 8th Parliament elections, Šķēle retired from politics and formally left all political party roles. However, it was very clear that Šķēle had a significant influence on the political and economic situation of the country as the role of the People's Party grew over the years. Latvia's later Prime Ministers Aigars Kalvitis (2004-2007), Laimdota Straujuma (2014-2016), and Maris Kucinskis (2016–2019) were members of the People's Party founded by Šķēle.

== Business ventures ==
Šķēle's family company has constantly been diversifying its portfolio of investments in Latvia. They have invested in renewable wind energy company "Vēja parks", as well as wood processing and agriculture. They have also managed and owned Liepājas Autobusu Parks (LAP) that is the leading regional passenger transportation group in Latvia.

In 2013, Šķēle formed a joint venture with former politician Ainārs Šlesers. Together they own Multi Capital Holding group that currently manages and own the private company, Riga Port. Riga Port is a leading operator, developer and investor of port assets and rail-related services in Latvia. They operate the largest coal and fertilizer terminals in the Baltics.

Šķēle in 2019 was working on the development of Riga Port City, as designed by Dutch architect Rem Koolhaas.

== Personal life ==
Andris Šķēle has been married twice. His wife Kristiāna Lībane-Šķēle is a well-known social worker, former parliament member and lawyer. At the same time, she is the Honorary Consul of Luxembourg in Riga, Latvia.

Šķēle has three children and his family for years has been named among the wealthiest families in Latvia.

Political offices
Preceded by Māris Gailis	Prime Minister of Latvia; 21 December 1995 – 6 August 1997	Succeeded by Guntars Krasts
Preceded by Vilis Krištopans	Prime Minister of Latvia; 16 July 1999 – 5 May 2000	Succeeded by Andris Bērziņš
