= Valdis Birkavs =

Latvian politician (born 1942)

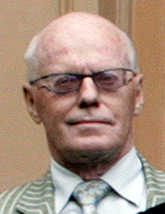
- Birkavs in 2011

11th Prime Minister of Latvia
- In office 3 August 1993 – 15 September 1994
- President: Guntis Ulmanis
- Preceded by: Ivars Godmanis
- Succeeded by: Māris Gailis

Personal details
- Born: 28 July 1942 (age 84) Riga, Ostland (now Latvia)
- Party: CPSU; Latvian Way
- Education: University of Latvia
- Profession: Lawyer

Valdis Birkavs (born 28 July 1942) is a Latvian politician. He was born in Riga. Birkavs attended the University of Latvia, where he studied philosophy, sociology, law, psychology and mathematical logic. He was first elected to the Latvian parliament in 1990 and helped to found the Latvian Way party. After Latvian Way won the 1993 parliamentary election, Birkavs became the prime minister, leading a coalition government of Latvian Way and the Latvian Farmers' Union. He resigned after the Farmer's Union left the government in the middle of 1994. He then became the deputy prime minister and foreign minister in the next government. He remained the foreign minister for five years under four different prime ministers, eventually resigning in 1999. In the presidential elections of 1999 (Latvia's president is chosen by the Parliament), he was nominated as a candidate and received second place. He was then appointed as minister of justice, and served in that position until 2000.

Birkavs is a member of the Club of Madrid, an independent non-profit organization composed of 81 democratic former Presidents and Prime Ministers from 57 countries.

In 1999 he was elected as the European of the Year in Latvia. In 2000 Birkavs was awarded with the 2nd class of the Order of the Three Stars.

== See also ==
- Birkavs cabinet

Political offices
Preceded by Ivars Godmanis	Prime Minister of Latvia; 3 August 1993 – 15 September 1994	Succeeded by Māris Gailis
