= Māris Gailis =

Latvian businessman and politician

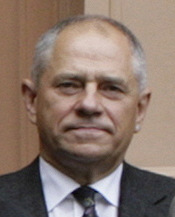
- Gailis in 2011

12th Prime Minister of Latvia
- In office 15 September 1994 – 21 December 1995
- President: Guntis Ulmanis
- Preceded by: Valdis Birkavs
- Succeeded by: Andris Šķēle

Personal details
- Born: 9 July 1951 (age 75) Riga, Latvian Soviet Socialist Republic
- Party: Latvian Way
- Education: Rīga Technical University

Māris Gailis (born 9 July 1951) is a Latvian businessman and former politician. He is the former prime minister of Latvia, an office he held from September 1994 to December 1995. In the government of the Prime Minister Valdis Birkavs, Gailis became a Minister of State Reform; in the government of the Prime Minister Andris Šķēle, he was the Minister of Environmental Protection and Regional Development. As a member of the right-wing liberal political party Latvian Way, he was elected in the 5th Saeima and 6th Saeima. He led a round-the-globe expedition on the yacht Milda from 2001 to 2003.

== Education ==
From 1967 to 1969 he studied at Riga Secondary School No. 1. Afterwards, he enrolled in Riga Polytechnical Institute, where he studied at the Faculty of Electric Energy from 1969 to 1971. Later, he transferred to the Faculty of Engineering and Mechanics and graduated in 1978 after achieving a degree in engineering sciences. He interrupted his studies from 1971 until 1973 due to service in the Soviet Army in Belarus, where he operated a tank squad.

== Work experience ==
In 1973, Gailis started working as a senior equipment engineer in the Riga Furniture Factory Teika, which was part of the Ministry of Timber Processing Industry in the Latvian Soviet Socialist Republic. He worked there until 1979. From 1979 to 1983, he was Chief Power Engineer in the Ministry of Timber Processing Industry of the Latvian SSR; he then became Chief Work Technical Inspector in the Central Committee of the Wood, Paper and Timber Processing Industry Worker Trade Union from 1983 until 1985. From 1985 to 1987, he was the Head of the Video Section in the Latvian SSR State Cinematography Committee. He also Established the Riga Video Centre, where he was Director from 1987 to 1990.

=== State administration ===
Gailis began his government career in 1990. For the next two years, he was Director General of the External Economic Relations Department in the Latvian Council of Ministers. After these two years, Gailis moved to the Ministry of Foreign Affairs where he worked for seven months, until September 1992, as Deputy for Economic Issues for the then Minister of Foreign Affairs Jānis Jurkāns.

=== Politics ===
At the end of 1992, together with others who shared the same views, Gailis established the most influential right-wing liberal political party of that time, Latvian Way. In 1993, Gailis was elected as a member of parliament in the 5th Saeima as a candidate for Latvian Way. In the government of the Prime Minister Valdis Birkavs, he became a Minister of State Reform and Deputy Prime Minister. In August 1994, Gailis was proposed for the office of Prime Minister and on 15 September the Saeima approved the government Gailis had put together. He held the office of Prime Minister until 21 December 1995. He was also elected as a member of parliament in the 6th Saeima, where he did not complete the full term of office. From November 1994 to December 1995, Gailis was Minister of Defence of the Republic of Latvia. In 1995, in the government of Andris Šķēle, he was Deputy Prime Minister as well as Minister of Environmental Protection and Regional Development. In 1996, he announced that he was leaving politics: he stepped down from the minister’s position, resigned as a member of parliament and turned to business.

=== Business ===
Gailis became chairman of the board in LLC Māris Gailis and President of LLC Nilda. He was also a Supervisory Council Member of JSC Latvian Shipping Company, JSC Līvānu stikls and SJSC Latvian Post. Until 2003, he was Chairman of the Supervisory Council for JSC Latvijas Gāze and for LLC Latrostrans. Until 2004, he was chairman of the board for LLC Tax Free Shopping. He was also a Council Member for JSC Ventspils nafta. Later, he also became Chairman of the Supervisory Council for the JSC Latvian Shipping Company. He served as chairman of the board for LLC Ziemeļzunds, for LLC Māris Gailis un partneri and for LLC MG nekustamie īpašumi. He was involved in a real property project development, of which the most significant parts were a gypsum factory and Ķīpsala terraced houses, amongst others. In 2011, he established a cloud computing technology company LLC VESet, where he is currently a board member.

== Public appointments ==
Gailis been the Head of several official state delegations of Latvia, as well as Chairman of the Organising Committee for the visit of U.S. President Bill Clinton to Latvia. He was a member of the Executive Committee for the Latvian Olympic Committee (1996–2000), and also served as President of the Latvian Yachtsmen Union from 1996 until 2006 (he is currently the Honorary President of this group). Association Burinieks, Chairman of the Board. Association Žaņa Lipkes memorials, Chairman of the Board. Richard Wagner Society of Riga, Chairman of the Board.

== Creative projects ==
In 1976, Gailis built one of the first windsurfing boards in Latvia and participated in the first windsurfing regatta on Lake Ķīšezers. In 1985, he developed the Latvian SSR Culture Pavilion in the World Youth and Students’ Festival in Moscow. He was also Director of the Acting Committee of the International Film Forum Arsenāls (1986–2011). Together with Augusts Sukuts, Māris founded the International Film Forum Arsenāls, the first of which took place in 1988. He led the yacht expedition Milda around the globe: on 9 July 2001 (his 50th birthday), he departed for a 2-year expedition around the globe on the yacht Milda (21 m long and 50 tonne two-mast schooner). On 22 April 2003, after a journey of approximately 40,000 nautical miles during which visited more than 30 countries, Milda arrived at Ventspils Port. In 2005 he established a non-governmental organisation Žaņa Lipkes memoriāls (a memorial to Žanis Lipke, a Riga Port worker who saved 55 Jews by concealing them in his family property during the 2nd World War). In 2008, the foundation was laid in Ķīpsalā for the construction of a memorial (architect Zaiga Gaile) that was completed in 2012. Together with his wife Zaiga Gaile, Māris Gailis was awarded the Riga City Council Award Resident of Riga for 2013 (Gada rīdzinieks 2013).

=== Books ===
1. Zaiga and Māris Gailis "Furniture for young people" ("Mēbeles jauniem cilvēkiem"). Riga, publishing house Avots (1987, 143 pages). This book was also published in Russian, by the publishing house Молодая гвардия in Moscow (1990, 172 pages).
2. "Technologies of Power" ("Varas tehnoloģijas"). Rīga, publishing house Jumava (1997, 314 pages). This book was also published by Jumava in Russian, entitled "Six years in Power" ("Шесть лет во власти") (1997, 334 pages).
3. "Milda Around the World" ("“Milda" apkārt pasaulei"). Rīga, publishing house Valters un Rapa (2004, 223 pages).

== Family ==
Gailis is married to architect Zaiga Gaile. He has four children: Iveta Leinasare, Agnese Irbe-GAile, Gatis Gailis, and Mārtiņš Gailis. He has eleven grandchildren.

== See also ==
- Gailis cabinet

Political offices
Preceded by Valdis Birkavs	Prime Minister of Latvia; 15 September 1994 – 21 December 1995	Succeeded by Andris Šķēle
