= Latvian Way =

Latvian political party

Latvian Way Latvijas Ceļš
- Leader: Ivars Godmanis
- Founded: 25 September 1993
- Dissolved: 25 August 2007
- Merged into: LPP/LC
- Headquarters: Riga
- Ideology: Conservative liberalism Economic liberalism
- Political position: Centre-right
- European affiliation: European Liberal Democrat and Reform Party
- European Parliament group: Alliance of Liberals and Democrats for Europe (2004–07)
- International affiliation: Liberal International
- Colours: Gold, Red, Black

Website
- lc.lv

Latvian Way (Latvian: Latvijas Ceļš) was a conservative-liberal political party in Latvia. It merged with Latvia's First Party to form the Latvia's First Party/Latvian Way (LPP/LC) in 2007.

It described itself as "a liberal party defending people's freedom to shape their own lives". Latvian Way was a member of Liberal International and the European Liberal Democrat and Reform Party.

== History ==
Latvian Way was founded on 25 September 1993, by a group of former activists of Popular Front of Latvia and Latvian exiles who had returned to Latvia after it regained independence. In its first election in 1993, Latvian Way won 32.4% of popular vote and became the leading party in a coalition government. Later, its popularity declined, with 14.6% of votes in 1995 election and 18.0% in 1998. Despite that, Latvian Way remained a powerful force in Latvian politics and was part of every coalition government in Latvia from July 1993 to November 2002. Four Latvian Way members were Prime Ministers: Valdis Birkavs (from 1993 to 1994), Māris Gailis (from 1994 to 1995), Vilis Krištopans (from 1998 to 1999) and Andris Bērziņš (from 2000 to 2002). A fifth former prime minister, Ivars Godmanis, joined the Latvian Way party after his term as prime minister ended.

In the 2002 general election, it got 4.9% of the vote, just under the 5% needed to secure representation in parliament. After this loss, several politicians left Latvian Way for other parties. Latvian Way regained some ground in the European Parliament Election in June 2004 with 6.5% of vote but it still faced an uncertain future and the difficult task of regaining voters' trust. For the 2006 election, Latvian Way formed an electoral coalition with the Latvia's First Party. They won 10 seats in the election, allowing Latvian Way to join the coalition government. Party chairman Ivars Godmanis became Minister of the Interior in November 2006, and then prime minister in December 2007. He resigned after protests paralysed the Latvian capital, Riga, due to the global economic crisis. On 20 February 2009, Godmanis resigned as prime minister along with the rest of his government amid concerns about handling the economic crisis.

== Electoral results ==
Election	Votes			Seats		Position	Government
Election	#	%	±	#	±	Position	Government
1993	362,473	32.4	▲32.4	36 / 100	▲36	▲1st	In government
1995	139,929	14.7	▼17.7	17 / 100	▼19	▼3rd	In government
1998	173,420	18.1	▲3.4	21 / 100	▲4	▲2nd	In government
2002	48,430	4.9	▼13.2	0 / 100	▼21	▼7th	In opposition

== See also ==
- Liberalism
- Contributions to liberal theory
- Liberalism worldwide
- List of liberal parties
- Liberal democracy
- Liberalism in Latvia
