= Speaker of the Saeima =

Presiding officer of the Parliament of Latvia

Speaker of the Saeima of the Republic of Latvia
- Latvijas Republikas Saeimas priekšsēdētājs
- Flag of the Speaker of the Saeima

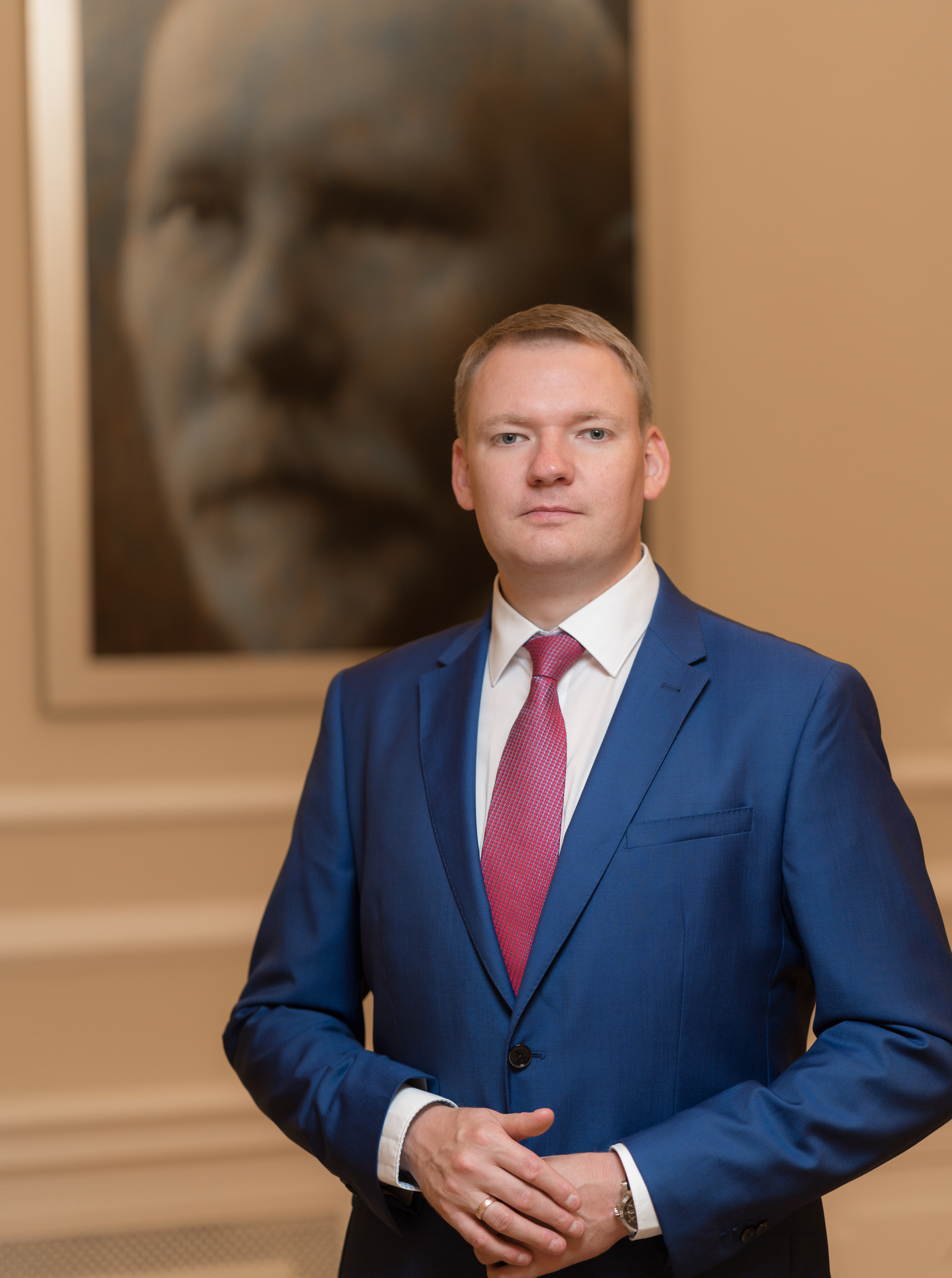
- Incumbent; Edvards Smiltēns since 3 November 2026
- Style: Mister Speaker (informal); The Honorable (formal)
- Seat: Saeima, City of Riga, Latvia
- Appointer: Saeima
- Term length: No term limit
- Constituting instrument: Constitution of Latvia
- Formation: 11 July 1922; 104 years ago
- First holder: Frīdrihs Vesmanis
- Salary: €36,000 annually

The Speaker of the Saeima (Latvian: Saeimas priekšsēdētājs; lit. "Chairperson of the Saeima") is the presiding officer of the Parliament of Latvia, the Saeima.

If the President of Latvia resigns from office, dies or is removed from office before their term has ended, the Speaker of the Saeima shall assume the duties of the President until the Saeima has elected a new President. Similarly, the Speaker of the Saeima shall assume the duties of the President if the latter is away from Latvia or for any other reason unable to fulfil the duties of office.

The Speaker of the Saeima must be elected at the first meeting of the current convocation of the Saeima.

== List of speakers ==
=== Speakers of the Saeima (1922–1934) ===
Parties

LSDSP

No.	Name	Portrait	Period	Party
1	Frīdrihs Vesmanis		November 7, 1922 – March 17, 1925	Latvian Social Democratic Workers' Party
2	Pauls Kalniņš		March 20, 1925 – May 15, 1934	Latvian Social Democratic Workers' Party

The Saeima was suspended after the 1934 Latvian coup d'état and during the occupation of the Baltic States.

=== Chairman of the Supreme Council (1990–1993) ===
Parties

LKP

No.	Name	Portrait	Period	Party
3	Anatolijs Gorbunovs		May 3, 1990 – July 6, 1993	Communist Party of Latvia (until 1991)

=== Speakers of the Saeima (after 1993) ===
Parties

LC LTF DP-S TB/LNNK ZZS-LZS ZZS-LZP ZZS-LUV NA-VL-TB/LNNK United List (Latvia)

No.	Name	Portrait	Period	Party
(3)	Anatolijs Gorbunovs		August 21, 1991 – February 13, 1993	Popular Front of Latvia
(3)	Anatolijs Gorbunovs		July 6, 1993 – November 7, 1995	Latvian Way
4	Ilga Kreituse		November 7, 1995 – September 26, 1996	Democratic Party "Saimnieks"
5	Alfrēds Čepānis		September 26, 1996 – November 3, 1998	Democratic Party "Saimnieks"
6	Jānis Straume		November 3, 1998 – November 5, 2002	For Fatherland and Freedom/LNNK
7	Ingrīda Ūdre		November 5, 2002 – November 7, 2006	Union of Greens and Farmers (Latvian Farmers' Union)
8	Indulis Emsis		November 7, 2006 – September 24, 2007	Union of Greens and Farmers (Latvian Green Party)
9	Gundars Daudze		September 24, 2007 – November 2, 2010	Union of Greens and Farmers (Latvijai un Ventspilij)
10	Solvita Āboltiņa		November 2, 2010 – November 4, 2014	Unity (New Era Party)
11	Ināra Mūrniece		November 4, 2014 – November 1, 2022	National Alliance
12	Edvards Smiltēns		November 1, 2022 – September 20, 2023	United List (Latvian Association of Regions)
13	Daiga Mieriņa		September 20, 2023 – November 3, 2026	Union of Greens and Farmers (Latvian Farmers' Union)
(12)	Edvards Smiltēns		November 3, 2026 – Incumbent	United List (Latvian Association of Regions)

== See also ==
- List of chairmen of the Supreme Soviet of the Latvian Soviet Socialist Republic
