= Māris Grīnblats =

Latvian politician (1955–2021)

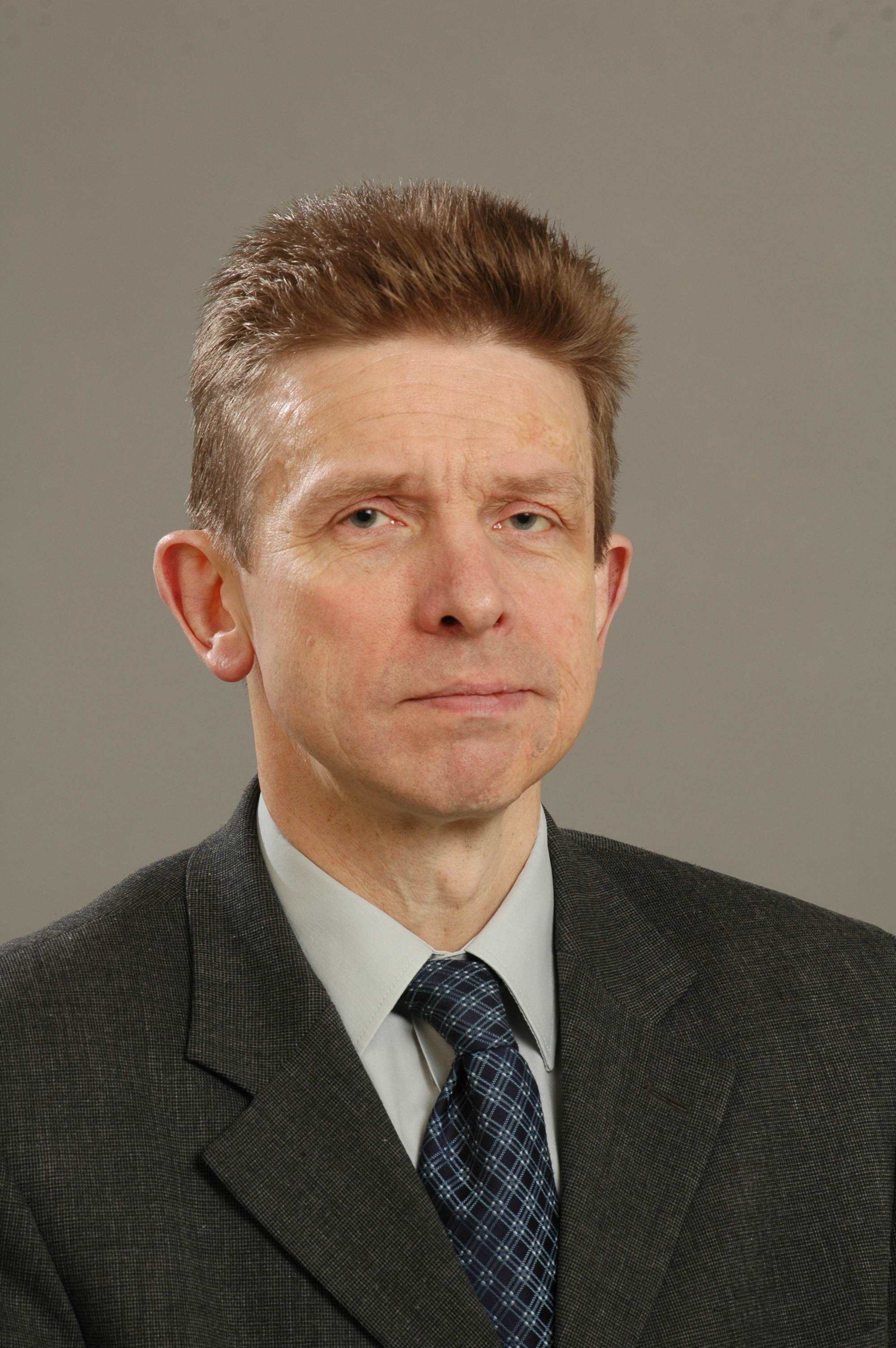

Deputy of the Saeima

Personal details
- Born: 5 January 1955 Kuldīga, Latvian SSR, Soviet Union
- Died: 14 March 2021 (aged 66)
- Party: For Fatherland and Freedom/LNNK; National Alliance
- Education: University of Latvia

Māris Grīnblats (5 January 1955 – 14 March 2021) was a Latvian politician and a member of the political party For Fatherland and Freedom/LNNK (TB/LNNK).

== Early life ==
Grīnblats was born on 5 January 1955 in Kuldīga, Latvian SSR.

From 1977 to 1982 he studied and graduated from the LVU Department of Philosophy. From 1980 to 1983, he was a sociologist of various departments of Latvian universities.

From 1988 Grīnblats was a member of the Madona branch of the Latvian People's Front (LTF), later he became its chairman. From 1989 to 1990 he was a member of the LTF Council. Grīnblats participated in the development of the Citizens' Congress of the Republic of Latvia, and in 1990 he was elected a delegate of the Citizens' Congress, where he was the Deputy Chairman of the Latvian Committee of the Citizens' Congress. From 1991 to 1993, he was chairman of the Citizens' Congress and a leader of the 18th November Union that emerged from it.

He became the founding leader of For Fatherland and Freedom (TB), a party that was created from 18 November Union, in 1993.

After the 1995 parliamentary election, Grīnblats, as leader of the centre-right 'National Bloc' coalition formed around TB, was asked to become Prime Minister, but, on 23 November, he failed to get the confidence of the Saeima: falling short by one vote. Instead, he became Minister for Education and Science and a Deputy Prime Minister to Andris Šķēle.

During Grīnblats leadership of TB, it merged with Latvian National Independence Movement to form the TB/LNNK, and Grīnblats became the party's first chairman. He remained in that position until 2002, at the beginning of the 8th Saeima, when he became President of the TB/LNNK's faction in the national legislature, the Saeima, which he remained in the 9th Saeima.

He ran in the 2010 Latvian parliamentary election as a member of the National Alliance list, but was not elected. Since then, he was working as a consultant of the party faction in the Saeima.

He died in March 2021.

== Footnotes ==
Party political offices
New title Party created by merger of TB and LNNK	Chairman of For Fatherland and Freedom/LNNK; 1997–2002	Succeeded by Jānis Straume
