= 1996 Latvian presidential election =

- June 18, 1996
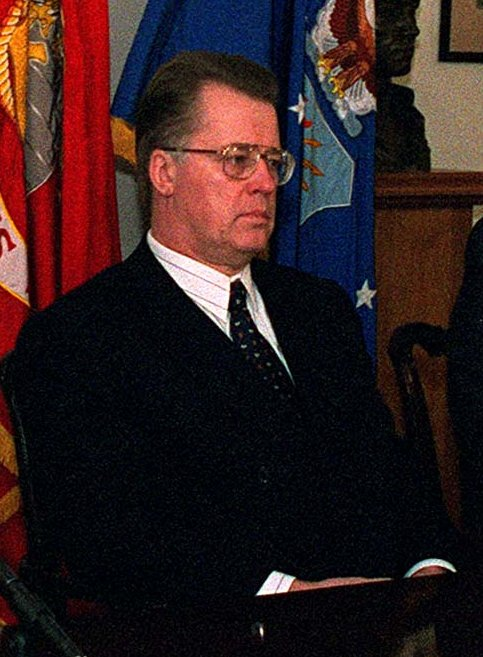

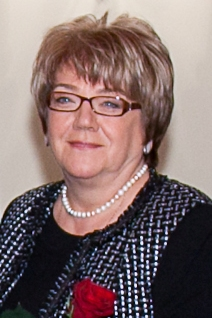

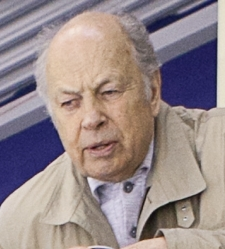
Nominee	Guntis Ulmanis	Ilga Kreituse	Imants Liepa
Party	LZS	Democratic Party "Saimnieks"	People's Movement for Latvia
Electoral vote	53	25	14
Nominee	Alfrēds Rubiks
Party	Socialist Party of Latvia
Electoral vote	5
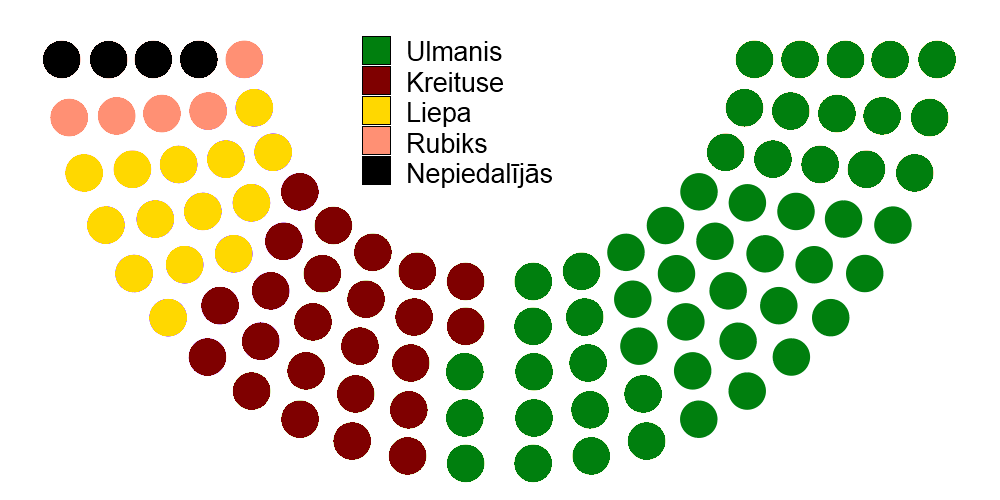
- Votes by MPs
President before election
Guntis Ulmanis
LZS
Elected President
Guntis Ulmanis
LZS

The 1996 presidential elections in Latvia took place on June 18, 1996. Guntis Ulmanis was re-elected President of Latvia. According to the Satversme, the President was elected by the 6th Saeima.

== Candidates ==
Candidate	Party
Guntis Ulmanis	Latvian Farmers' Union, Christian Democratic Union, Latgale Democrats Party
Ilga Kreituse	Democratic Party "Saimnieks"
Imants Liepa	People's Movement for Latvia
Alfrēds Rubiks	Socialist Party of Latvia

== Election process and results ==
There was a scandal surrounding the election due to the fact that one of the nominated presidential candidates, Alfrēds Rubiks, was in prison at that time, thus there was an active debate on this issue in the previous Saeima sittings before the presidential elections. It was also decided to extend the president's term from three to four years, but only from the next presidential election onwards. In the first round of voting, one of the candidates, incumbent President Guntis Ulmanis collected the necessary number of votes to be re-elected President of Latvia.

Candidate	Party	Votes	%
Guntis Ulmanis	Latvian Farmers' Union	53	54.64
Ilga Kreituse	Democratic Party "Saimnieks"	25	25.77
Imants Liepa	People's Movement for Latvia	14	14.43
Alfrēds Rubiks	Socialist Party of Latvia	5	5.15
Total		97	100.00
