= Jānis Straume =

Latvian politician (1962–2024)

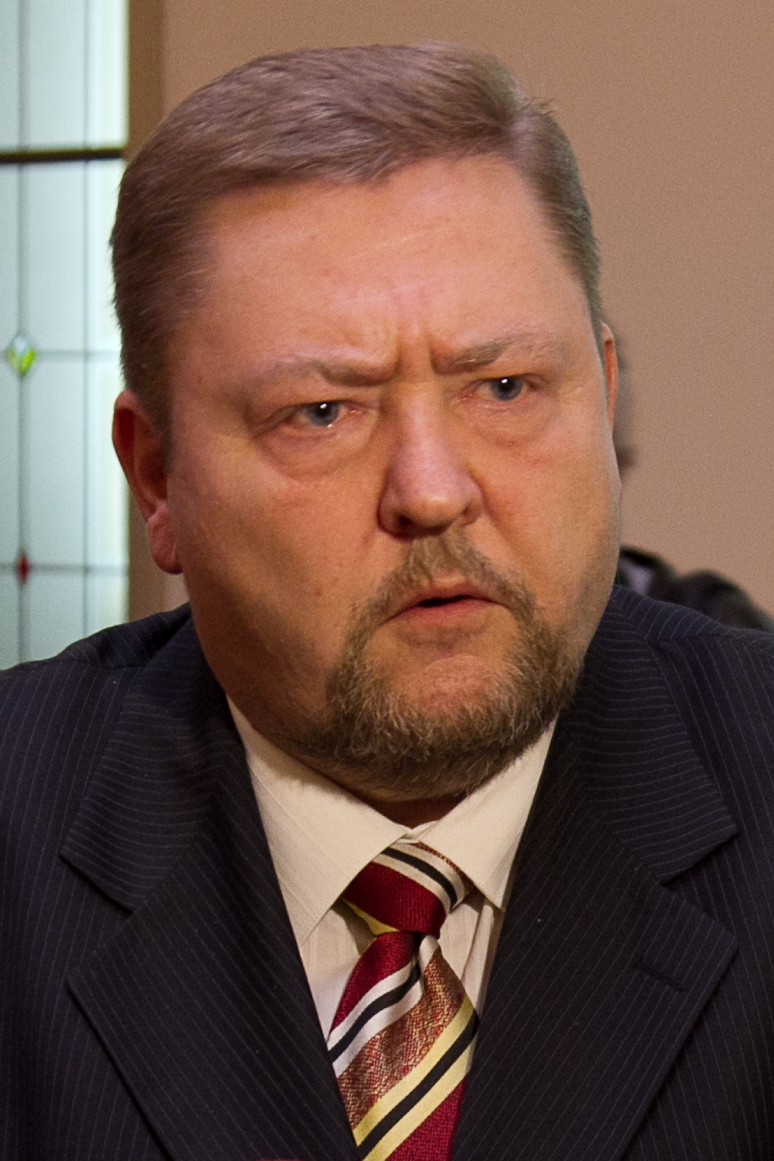
Straume in 2012

Jānis Straume (27 August 1962 – 10 July 2024) was a Latvian politician for For Fatherland and Freedom/LNNK (TB/LNNK). He was the fourth Speaker of the Saeima (1998–2002) since 1991.

Straume was a leading member of a number of organisations in the Latvian independence movement, including Helsinki-86, the Latvian National Independence Movement, the Citizens' Congress, and the 18th November Union.

When the 18th November Union merged into For Fatherland and Freedom, he became a party member. He served as the Speaker of the Saeima from 1998 to 2002, during the 7th Saeima. He was chairman of the TB/LNNK from 2002 to 2006, during the 8th Saeima, when he was also Deputy Chairman of the Saeima.

On the morning of 10 July 2024, an accident was reported on Lielupes Street in Jūrmala (near Jaundubulti Station), when a train fatally ran over a pedestrian. The man was later identified as Straume, and it was confirmed that he deliberately threw himself under the train. He was 61.

Political offices
Preceded by Alfrēds Čepānis	Speaker of the Saeima; 1998–2002	Succeeded by Ingrīda Ūdre
Party political offices
Preceded by Māris Grīnblats	Chairman of For Fatherland and Freedom/LNNK; 2002–2006	Succeeded by Roberts Zīle
