= Alfrēds Čepānis =

Latvian politician (1943–2024)

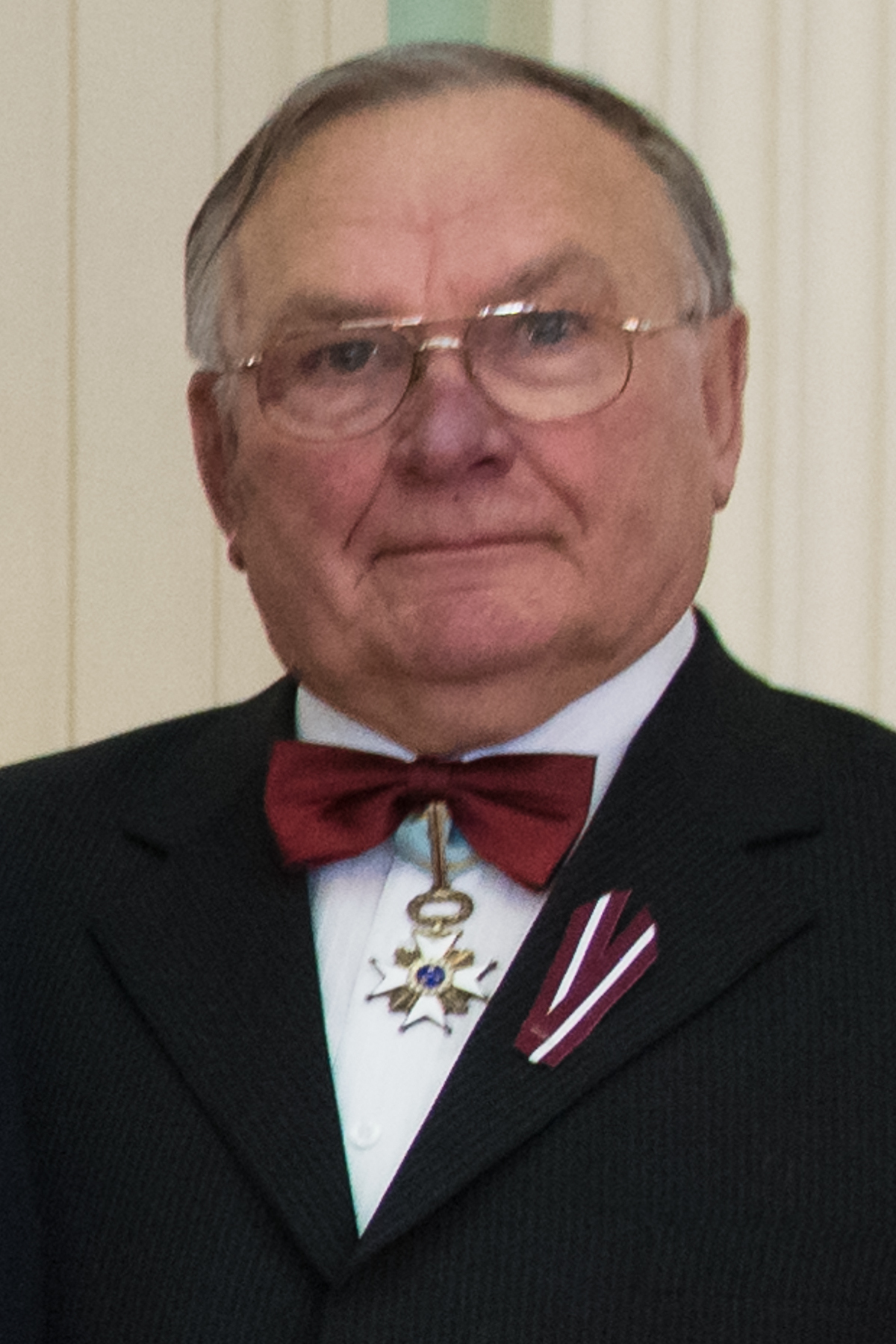
- Čepānis in 2018

Speaker of the Saeima
- In office 26 September 1996 – 3 November 1998
- President: Guntis Ulmanis
- Prime Minister: Andris Šķēle (1996–1997); Guntars Krasts (1997–1998)
- Preceded by: Ilga Kreituse
- Succeeded by: Jānis Straume

Personal details
- Born: 3 August 1943 Kalsnava Parish, Generalbezirk Lettland, Reichskommissariat Ostland
- Died: 26 April 2024 (aged 80)
- Party: Communist Party of the Soviet Union; Democratic Center Party of Latvia (until 1995); Democratic Party "Saimnieks" (1995–1999); Latvian Democratic Party (1999–2004); New Centre (2004–20??)
- Spouse: Ilma Čepāne

Alfrēds Čepānis (3 August 1943 – 26 April 2024) was a Latvian politician and the Speaker of the Saeima from 1996 to 1998.

== Biography ==
Čepānis was born in a Lithuanian and Belarusian family, where they spoke only Latvian in their household. In 1957, he graduated from Kalsnava Primary School and continued his studies at Jaungulbene Vocational School and Riga. After graduating from primary school, Čepānis worked in agriculture where was an assistant tractor driver, tractor driver and combine harvester. From 1968 to 1974, he worked for the Komsomol and in 1973 graduated in part from the Higher Party School in Moscow.

In 1990, Čepānis was elected as the deputy of the Supreme Council. In 1993 he was elected to the 5th Saeima as a part of the Democratic Center Party of Latvia, and two years later was elected to the 6th Saeima as a part of the Democratic Party "Saimnieks", becoming a member of the Speaker of the Saeima. On 26 September 1996, after Ilga Kreituse resigned from the faction, Čepānis became the 7th Speaker of the Saeima.

In 1999, he was elected to the Council of Trasta Komercbanka and later became its Deputy Chairman in 2006. He was elected to the Riga City Council in 2006 for the Latvian Democratic Party, the successor of "Saimnieka." Following the liquidation of Latvian Democratic Party in 2004, he became a founder of the party New Centre.

Čepānis died on 26 April 2024, at the age of 80.

== Honors ==
- Latvia:
  - Commander with Chain of the Order of the Three Stars
