= List of ministers of defence of Latvia =

Standard of the minister of defence of Latvia

The defence minister of the Republic of Latvia (Latvian: Latvijas Republikas aizsardzības ministrs) is the head of the Ministry of Defence, who is charged with the political leadership of the Latvian National Armed Forces. The position was re-established in November 1991 following the declaration on the restoration of the country's independence from the USSR.

Since 28 May 2026, the position has been held by Raivis Melnis.

From 1918 to 1922 the officeholder's title was Minister of Protection (Apsardzības ministrs), and from 1922 to 1940 — Minister of War (Kaŗa ministrs).

== List of ministers (since 1991) ==
Name	Portrait	Term of office		Political party	Prime Minister
Tālavs Jundzis		19 November 1991	3 August 1993	Popular Front of Latvia	Ivars Godmanis
Valdis Pavlovskis		3 August 1993	19 September 1994	Latvian Way	Valdis Birkavs
Jānis Arveds Trapāns		19 September 1994	23 May 1995	Independent	Māris Gailis
Andrejs Krastiņš		21 December 1995	12 May 1997	LNNK	Andris Šķēle
Tālavs Jundzis		6 June 1997	27 October 1998	KDS	Andris Šķēle
Tālavs Jundzis		6 June 1997	27 October 1998	KDS	Guntars Krasts
Ģirts Valdis Kristovskis		26 November 1998	9 March 2004	TB/LNNK	Vilis Krištopans
Ģirts Valdis Kristovskis		26 November 1998	9 March 2004	TB/LNNK	Andris Šķēle
Ģirts Valdis Kristovskis		26 November 1998	9 March 2004	TB/LNNK	Andris Bērziņš
Ģirts Valdis Kristovskis		26 November 1998	9 March 2004	TB/LNNK	Einars Repše
Atis Slakteris		9 March 2004	2 December 2004	People's Party	Indulis Emsis
Einars Repše		2 December 2004	23 December 2005	New Era Party	Aigars Kalvītis
Linda Mūrniece		5 January 2006	7 April 2006	New Era Party	Aigars Kalvītis
Atis Slakteris		8 April 2006	20 December 2007	People's Party	Aigars Kalvītis
Vinets Veldre		20 December 2007	12 March 2009	People's Party	Ivars Godmanis
Imants Lieģis		12 March 2009	3 November 2010	Civic Union	Valdis Dombrovskis
Artis Pabriks		3 November 2010	22 January 2014	Unity	Valdis Dombrovskis
Raimonds Vējonis		22 January 2014	7 July 2015	Union of Greens and Farmers	Laimdota Straujuma
Raimonds Bergmanis		8 July 2015	23 January 2019	Union of Greens and Farmers	Laimdota Straujuma
Raimonds Bergmanis		8 July 2015	23 January 2019	Union of Greens and Farmers	Māris Kučinskis
Artis Pabriks		23 January 2019	14 December 2022	Development/For!	Krišjānis Kariņš
Ināra Mūrniece		14 December 2022	15 September 2023	National Alliance	Krišjānis Kariņš
Andris Sprūds		15 September 2023	10 May 2026	The Progressives	Evika Siliņa
Raivis Melnis		28 May 2026	present	Independent	Andris Kulbergs

== See also ==
- Ministry of Defence (Latvia)
- Latvian National Armed Forces
