= LNNK =

LNNK may stand for:

- Latvian National Independence Movement (Latvijas Nacionālās Neatkarības Kustība), a political organization in Latvia 1988–1997
- For Fatherland and Freedom/LNNK (Tēvzemei un Brīvībai/LNNK), a political party in Latvia 1997–2011
