= 1993 Latvian parliamentary election =

Parliamentary election held in Latvia

← 1990	5–6 June 1993	1995 →
- All 100 seats in the Saeima; 51 seats needed for a majority
- Turnout: 91.18% ▲ (9,93 pp)
Party	Leader	Vote %	Seats
LC	Valdis Birkavs	32.41	36
LNNK	Joachim Siegerist	13.35	15
SL	Jānis Jurkāns	12.01	13
LZS	Jānis Kinna	10.65	12
Equal Rights	Tatjana Ždanoka	5.76	7
TB	Māris Grīnblats	5.35	6
LKDS	Andris Teikmanis	5.01	6
DCP	Ints Cālītis	4.77	5
This lists parties that won seats. See the complete results below.
Results by district
Prime Minister before	Prime Minister after
Ivars Godmanis; Popular Front of Latvia	Valdis Birkavs; Latvian Way

Parliamentary elections were held in Latvia on 5 and 6 June 1993, the first after independence was restored in 1991. Latvian Way emerged as the largest party in the Saeima, winning 36 of the 100 seats. A total of 23 parties participated in the elections, although only eight received 4% or more of votes and won seats. Voter turnout was 91.2%, the highest in the country's history. Only 66–75% of Latvian residents were citizens and qualified to vote, with the majority of those not able to vote being Russian.

== Results ==
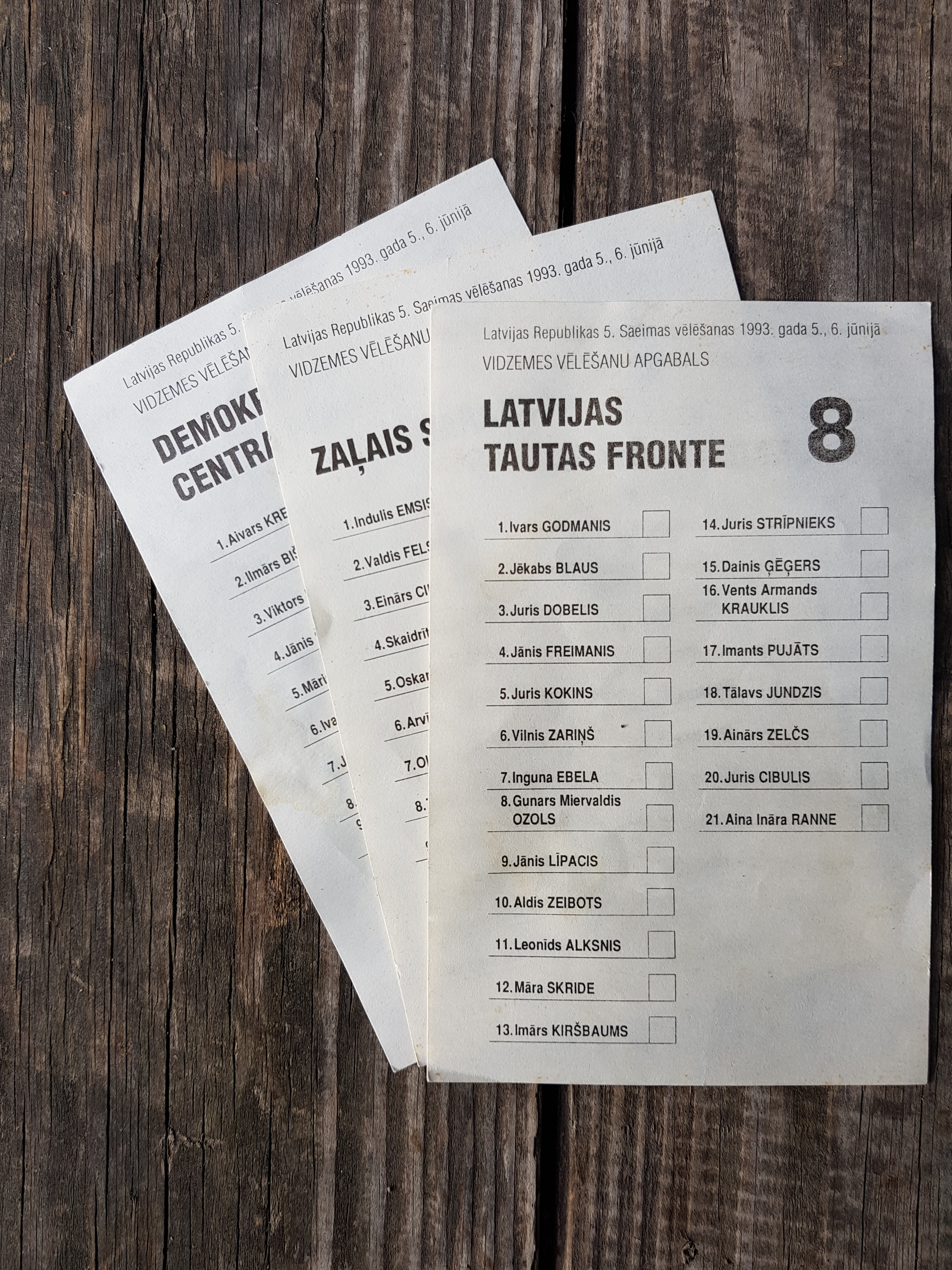
Ballot papers of 1993 parliamentary election

Party	Votes	%	Seats
Latvian Way	362,473	32.41	36
Latvian National Independence Movement	149,347	13.35	15
Harmony for Latvia	134,289	12.01	13
Latvian Farmers' Union	119,116	10.65	12
Equal Rights	64,444	5.76	7
For Fatherland and Freedom	59,855	5.35	6
Christian Democratic Union	56,057	5.01	6
Democratic Center Party	53,303	4.77	5
Popular Front of Latvia	29,396	2.63	0
Green List	13,362	1.19	0
Party of Russian Citizens in Latvia	13,006	1.16	0
Latvian Democratic Labour Party	10,509	0.94	0
Electoral Union "Happiness of Latvia"	9,814	0.88	0
Citizens Union "Our Land"	8,687	0.78	0
Economic Activity League	8,333	0.75	0
Latvian Social Democratic Workers' Party	7,416	0.66	0
Anti-Communist Union	5,954	0.53	0
Republican Platform	5,075	0.45	0
Conservatives and Peasants	2,797	0.25	0
Independents' Union	1,968	0.18	0
Latvian Liberal Party	1,520	0.14	0
Latvian Unity Party	1,070	0.10	0
Liberal Alliance	525	0.05	0
Total	1,118,316	100.00	100
Valid votes	1,118,316	98.60	
Invalid/blank votes	15,888	1.40	
Total votes	1,134,204	100.00	
Registered voters/turnout	1,243,956	91.18	
Source: Nohlen & Stöver

== Aftermath ==
A coalition minority government was formed between Latvian Way and the Latvian Farmers' Union. However, the coalition only commanded the support of 48 out of the 100 MPs, meaning that it was heavily reliant on opposition parties to ensure a parliamentary majority.
