= Ministry of Defence (Latvia) =

Government ministry of Latvia

Ministry of Defence of the Republic of Latvia
- Latvijas Republikas Aizsardzības ministrija
- Coat of arms of Latvia

- Building of Ministry of Defence in Riga

Agency overview
- Formed: 22 November 1918 (current form 13 November 1991)
- Jurisdiction: Government of Latvia
- Headquarters: Krišjāņa Valdemāra 10/12 Riga, Latvia
- Employees: 1200
- Minister responsible: Raivis Melnis, Minister
- Website: www.mod.gov.lv

The Ministry of Defence of the Republic of Latvia (Latvian: Latvijas Republikas Aizsardzības ministrija) is the Latvian government ministry in charge of the formation and implementation of national security and defence policy, and for the overall management and control of related subordinate agencies, such as the Latvian National Armed Forces. The ministry is headed by the politically appointed Minister of Defence.

The ministry was established on 22 November 1918 as the Ministry of Protection (Latvian: Apsardzības ministrija), just four days after the proclamation of the independence of Latvia. Jānis Zālītis, a member of the People's Council of Latvia, was appointed as minister. After the end of the Latvian War of Independence, in 1922 the ministry was renamed as the Ministry of War (Latvian: Kara ministrija).

After the occupation of Latvia in 1940 by the Soviet Union, the ministry was formally dissolved on 27 September 1940, and its building taken over by the HQ of the Baltic Military District of the Soviet Army until August 1994. On 13 November 1991, the ministry was re-established in its current form as the Ministry of Defence on the basis of the Public Security Department by the Supreme Council of the Republic of Latvia.

== Core tasks ==
- Strategic analysis, research and development (R&D)
- The development of long-term policy including future strategic concepts and doctrines
- Perspective and structural planning
- Planning, budgeting and implementation in the medium and short term
- Overall management of agencies’ activities during the budget year
- Operational policy, planning and management at a strategic level
- Exercise policy, planning and management at a strategic level
- Emergency planning, policy and management at a strategic level
- Crisis management
- Development and implementation of security policy, both nationally and internationally
- Development of defence cooperation with allied- and partner countries
- Strategic personnel management
- Information, communication and press relations
- Strategic leadership and management in the field of ICT
- Organisational development
- Preventive security at a strategic level
- Legal questions
- Controller / Internal audit
- Internal administration

== Symbols ==
As all Latvian government institutions since January 2015, the Ministry of Defence uses the Large Coat of Arms of Latvia as its logo, sometimes topped with a bar of the respective color of the ministry (HEX #666633 or olive green in this case). A previous symbol, which is still occasionally used by the ministry, consists of a rising sun with three stars in the center, similar to the cap badge of the Latvian Armed Forces adopted during the Latvian War of Independence and still in use today.

The rising sun symbol is also visible on the top left corner of the personal Standard of the Minister of Defence (Latvian: Aizsardzības ministra karogs), adopted on 25 August 1922 and still in use today.

Flag of the Minister of Defence of Latvia

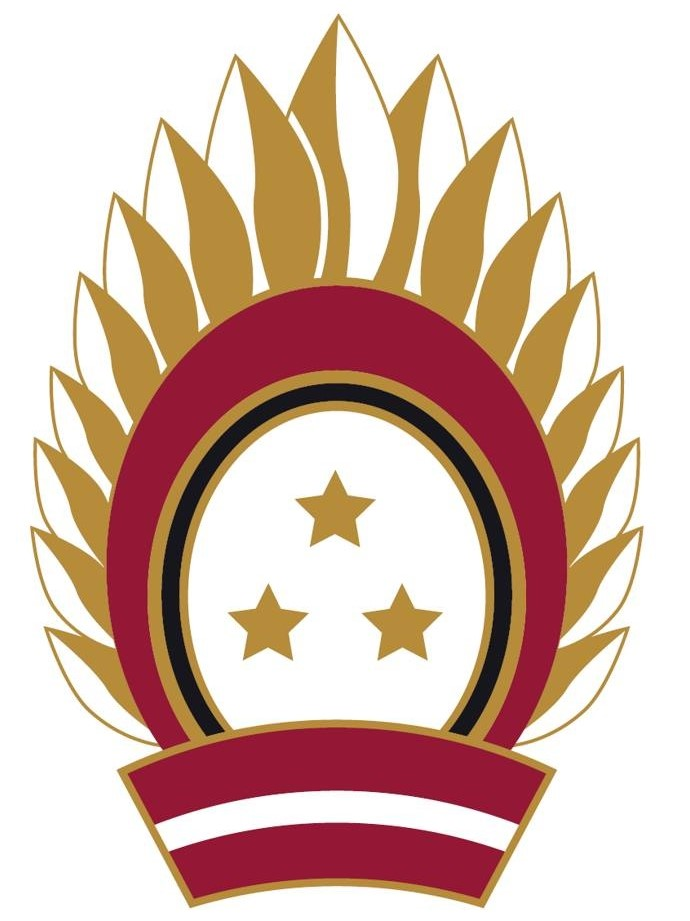
Emblem of the Ministry of Defence

== Agencies ==
Subordinate institutions of the Ministry of Defence of Latvia are:

- Military Intelligence and Security Service (MIDD)
- Latvian Geospatial Information Agency (LGIA)
- State Agency "Latvian War Museum"
- National Defence Military Facilities and Procurement Centre (VAMOIC)
- Youth Guard and Information Centre
- Latvian National Armed Forces
- National Defence Academy of Latvia

== See also ==
- List of ministers of defence of Latvia
