= Ilga Kreituse =

Latvian politician (born 1952)

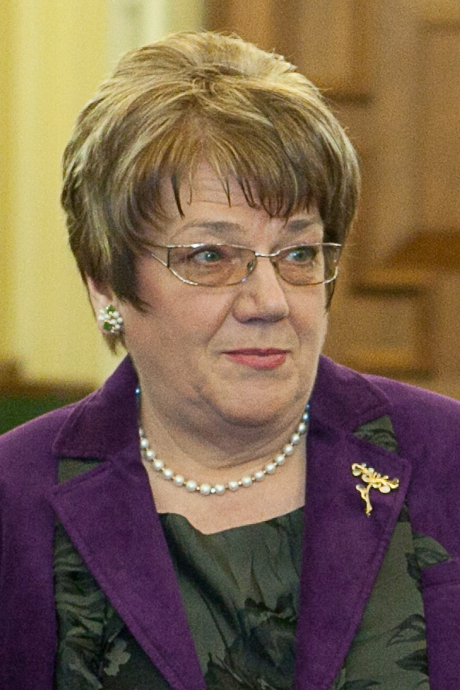
- Kreituse in 2012

Speaker of the Saeima
- In office November 7, 1995 – September 26, 1996
- President: Guntis Ulmanis
- Prime Minister: Māris Gailis (1995); Andris Šķēle (1995–1996)
- Preceded by: Anatolijs Gorbunovs
- Succeeded by: Alfrēds Čepānis

Personal details
- Party: Communist Party of the Soviet Union (1988–1989); Democratic Center Party of Latvia; Democratic Party "Saimnieks"; Labor Party
- Spouse(s): Jānis Goris; Aivars Kreituss
- Education: University of Latvia; Moscow State University
- Occupation: Historian

Ilga Kreituse (née Grava; born 5 July 1952) is a Latvian politician, historian, and former Speaker of the Saeima.

== Biography ==
Kreituse was born in Tērvete and lived with her family, later moving to Jūrmala. In 1970, she graduated from Jūrmala Secondary School No. 3. From 1972 until 1977, Kreituse studied at the Faculty of History and Philosophy at the University of Latvia. From 1977 to 1980, she was involved with postgraduate studies at Moscow State University. In 1982, she left the university, defending her dissertation on "the use of mathematical methods in historical science." After returning to Latvia, she worked at the Faculty of History and Philosophy, the Institute of Party History and the Latvian Academy of Sciences. She also worked as a teacher at Riga State Gymnasium No.1.

She was elected to the 5th Saeima as a part of the Democratic Center Party. After the merger of the Democratic Center Party of Latvia and as a part of the Democratic Party "Saimnieks" in the 6th Saeima elections. She was then elected as the Speaker of the Saeima on November 7, 1995, remaining in office until her resignation on September 26, 1996. That same year, she ran for the presidential election and took second place after the re-elected Guntis Ulmanis. In September 1996 he resigned from the DPS faction, but continued to work in the 6th Saeima as an independent member.

After the split of the Democratic Party "Saimnieks," she and her second husband Aivars Kreituss, he became the leaders of the newly formed Labor Party. In the 7th Saeima elections in 1998, Kreituse ran in the joint list of the Labor Party, the Latvian Green Party and the Christian Democratic Union, which did not receive the necessary support to enter the Saeima. She was elected to the Riga City Council in 2001, but resigned in favor of Kreituss taking the lead. In the 9th Saeima elections, together with the Labor Party, she participated in the Latvian Social Democratic Workers' Party list, which did not overcome the 5% barrier.
