= Latvian Geospatial Information Agency =

- Latvijas Ģeotelpiskās informācijas aģentūra LĢIA

Agency overview
- Formed: 2005
- Jurisdiction: Latvia
- Headquarters: 43 Ojāra Vācieša street, Riga
- Parent agency: Minister of Defense
- Website: www.lgia.gov.lv

The Latvian Geospatial Information Agency (Latvian: Latvijas Ģeotelpiskās informācijas aģentūra (LĢIA)) is a direct administration institution under the supervision of the Ministry of Defence that implements state policy in the field of geodesy, cartography and geospatial information and participates in the development of that policy.

== Functions ==
The agency has the following functions:

- to acquire, process and maintain fundamental geospatial data for military and civil needs, and to ensure the fulfilment of other functions specified in the Geospatial Information Law.
- to develop a unified information system for the fundamental geospatial data referred to in the Geospatial Information Law.
- to cooperate, within its competence, with state and local government institutions, NATO member states, European Union institutions and relevant international organisations, and to provide geodetic, cartographic and geospatial information to them and to the public.
