= Citizens' Congress =

Citizens' Congress can either refer to:

- Citizens' Congress of the Republic of Latvia
- Congress of Estonia
