= 1990 Latvian Supreme Soviet election =

← 1985	18 March 1990	1993 →
- All 201 seats in the Supreme Soviet; 101 seats needed for a majority
Party	Leader	Vote %	Seats	+/–
LTF	Dainis Īvāns	68.20	131	New
LKP	Jānis Vagris	21.50	55	−146
Independents	–	10.30	15	New
This lists parties that won seats. See the complete results below.
Chairmen of the Presidium of the Supreme Soviet before	Chairman of the Supreme Council after
Anatolijs Gorbunovs; LKP	Anatolijs Gorbunovs; Independent

Parliamentary elections were held in the Latvian SSR on 18 March 1990. It was the first free parliamentary election in Latvia since 1931 and saw 201 deputies elected to the Supreme Soviet of the Latvian SSR, 170 of them in the first round. Run-off elections were held on 25 March 1 and 29 April. The Popular Front of Latvia won over two-thirds of the vote. Unlike its Estonian and Lithuanian counterparts, the Latvian Communist Party did not separate from the Communist Party of the Soviet Union. Nonetheless, on 3 May 1990, the new Supreme Soviet re-elected the Communist Party member Anatolijs Gorbunovs as its chairman, effectively the leader of Latvia. He subsequently resigned from the party, and a year later the Communist Party was banned by the parliament.

The elected parliament was responsible for some of the most important decisions in modern Latvian history, such as the declaration of renewed independence from the Soviet Union.

It was the first and only free election to the Supreme Soviet of Latvian SSR. The next parliament was elected as Saeima in 1993.

Voting was held on the same day as municipal elections and elections in the Estonian SSR.

== Results ==
Party	Votes	%	Seats
Popular Front of Latvia	1,086,439	68.20	131
Communist Party of Latvia	342,499	21.50	55
Independents	164,080	10.30	15
Total	1,593,018	100.00	201
Registered voters/turnout	1,960,638	–	
Source: Nohlen & Stöver
