= Michigan–Latvia National Guard Partnership =

Michigan–Latvia State Partnership
- Part of the U.S. European Command State Partnership Program
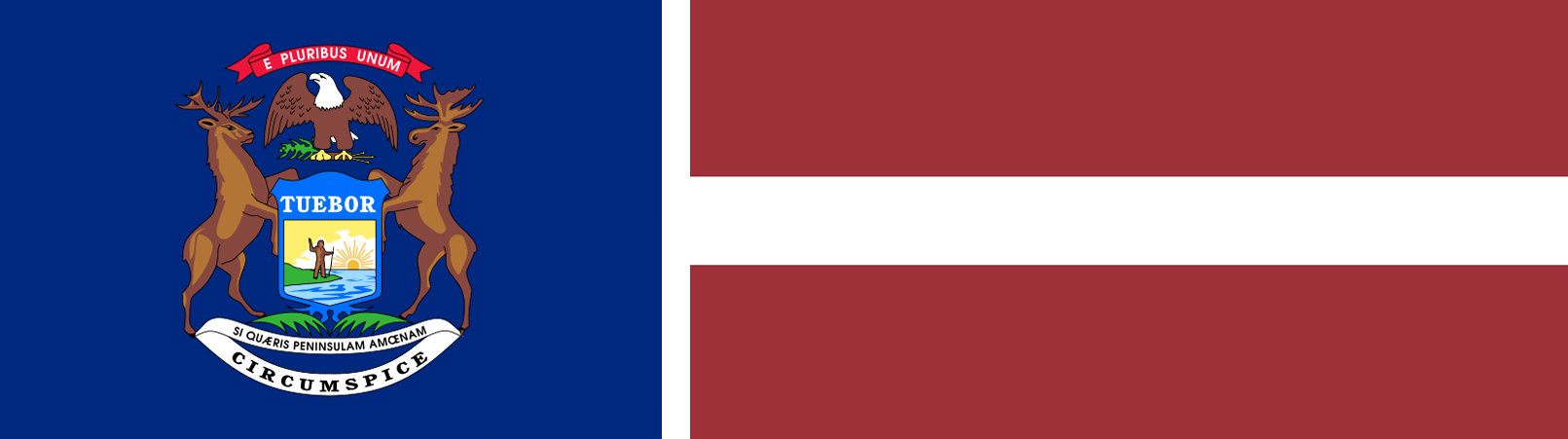
- Origin: 1993
- Country president: Edgars Rinkēvičs
- Prime minister: Evika Siliņa
- Minister of defense: Andris Sprūds
- Ambassador to U.S.: Elita Kuzma
- Ambassador to Latvia: Melissa Argyros
- Adjutant general: MG Paul Rogers
- 2012 Engagements: 8
- NATO member: Yes (2004)
- EU member: Yes (2004)

Latvia

The Michigan–Latvia National Guard Partnership is one of 25 European partnerships that make up the U.S. European Command State Partnership Program and one of 88 worldwide partnerships that make-up the National Guard State Partnership Program. A partnership was established in 1993 and serves as a model SPP program for other nations. The current focus is HNS/ Reception, Staging, Orientation, and Integration (RSOI), Chemical-Biological-Radiological-Nuclear-Environmental (CBRNE) / Disaster Response, Joint Tactical Air Control (JTAC), Air Force & base development, and Contingency Operation Support.

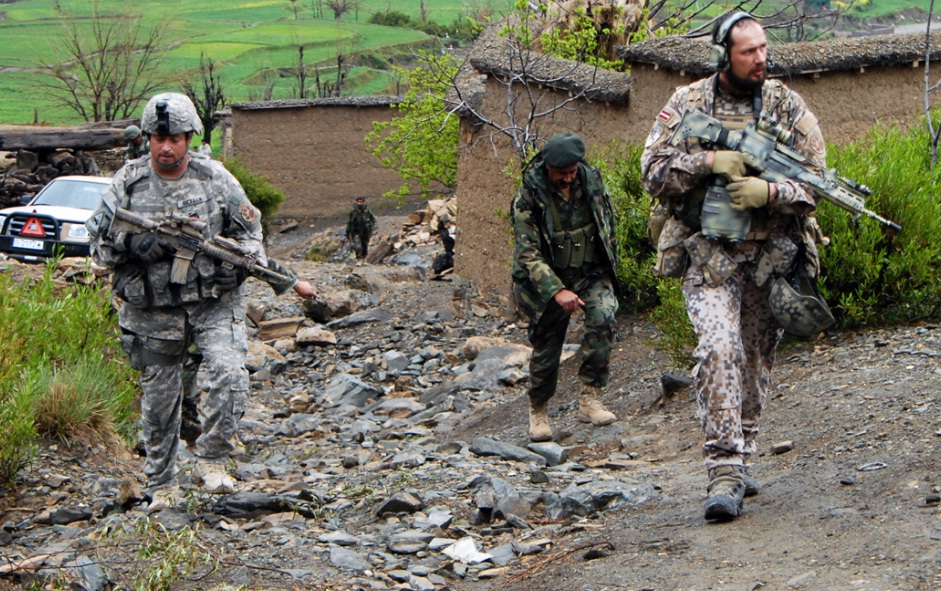
Soldiers from the Michigan National Guard and the Latvian army patrol through a village Afghanistan alongside members of the Afghan national army. M4 carbine M249 variant

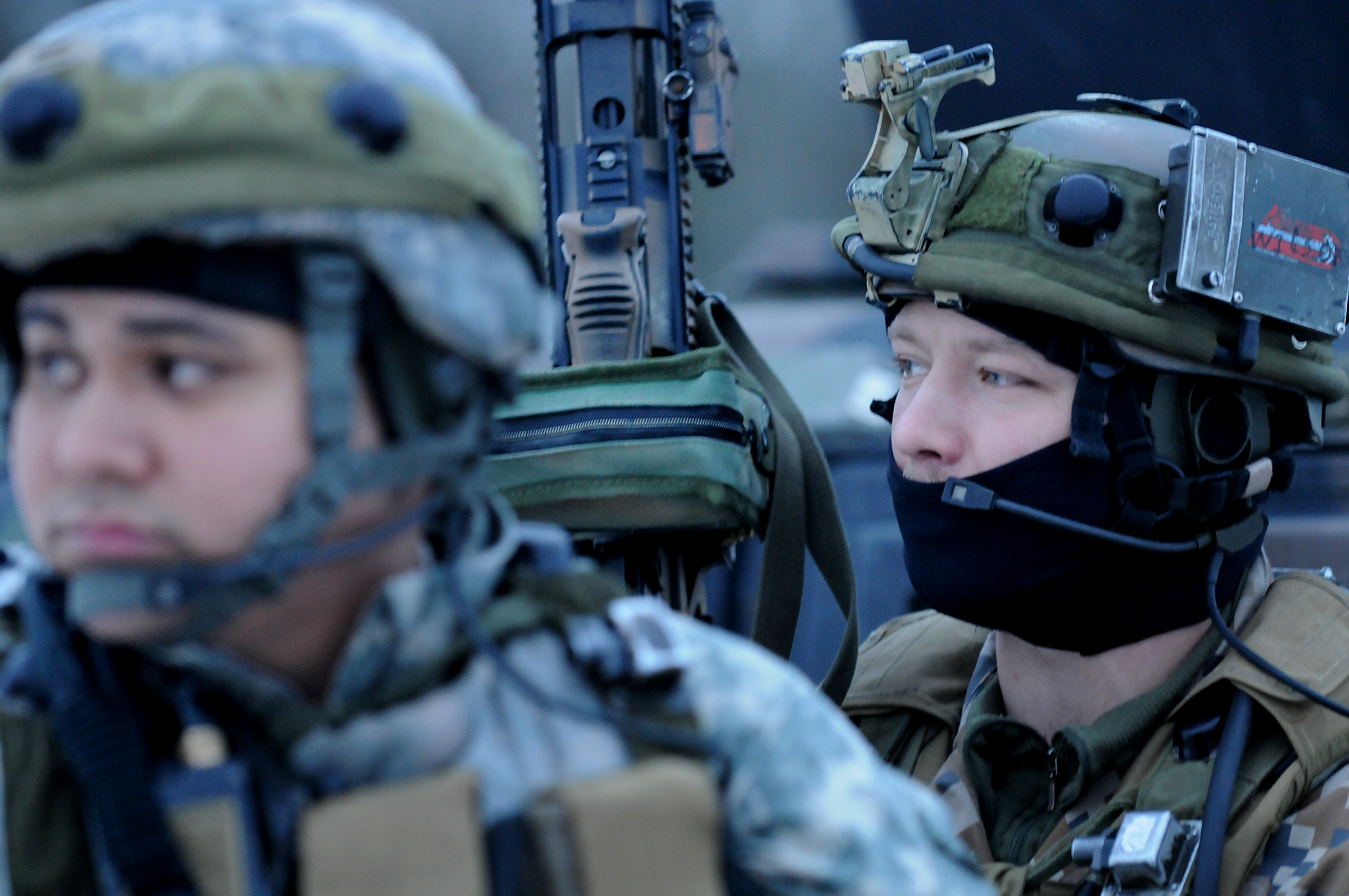
A Soldier in the Michigan National works alongside a Latvian Soldier during a simulated-combat exercise at the Joint Multinational Readiness Center in Germany.

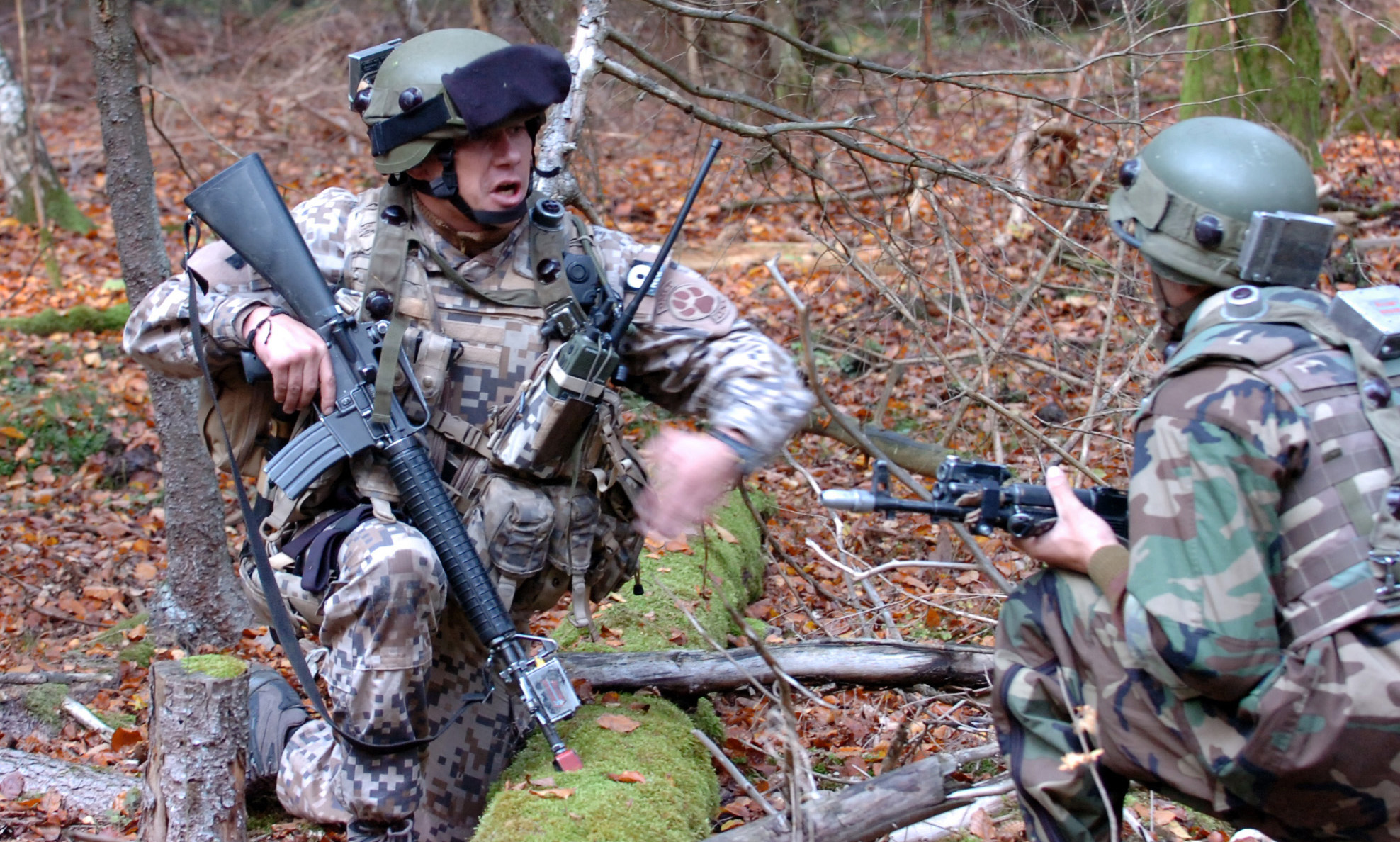
A Latvian soldier and an Afghan soldier communicate during Operational Mentor and Liaison Team training at the Joint Multinational Readiness Center in Germany.

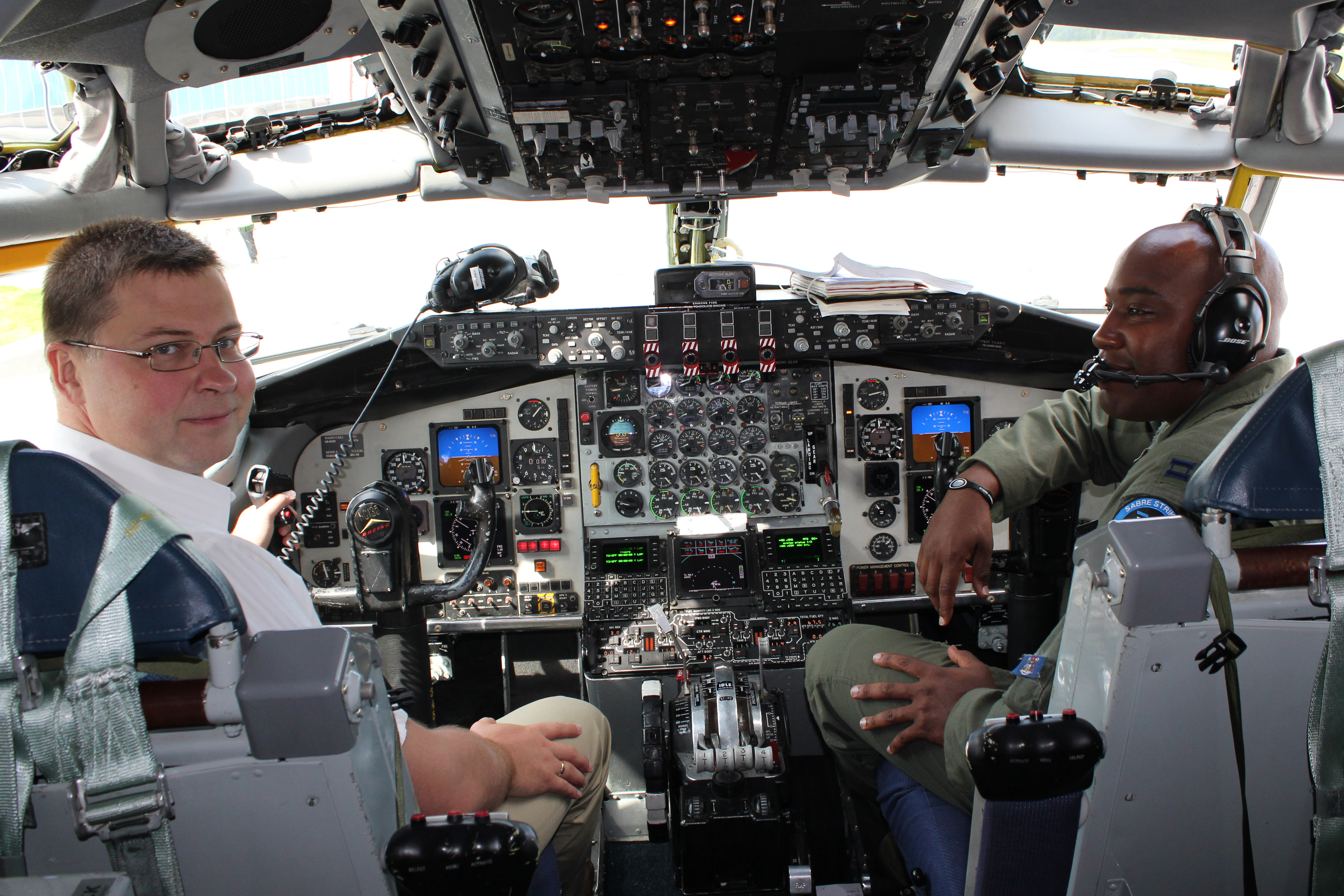
The prime minister of Latvia sits at the controls of a KC-135 Stratotanker along with an officer from the Michigan Air National Guard

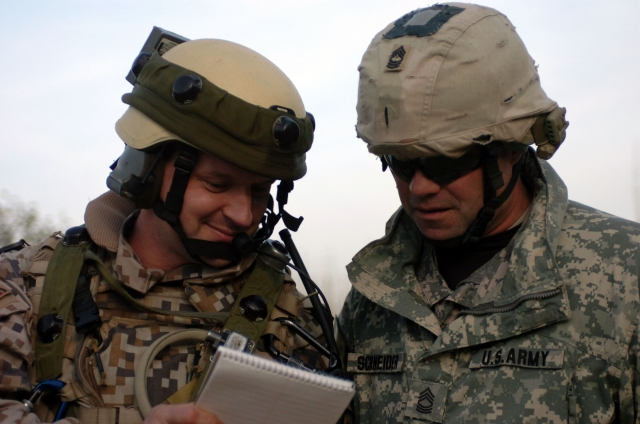
A Latvian Soldier compares notes with a Michigan Army National Guard Soldier at the Joint Multinational Readiness Center in Germany.

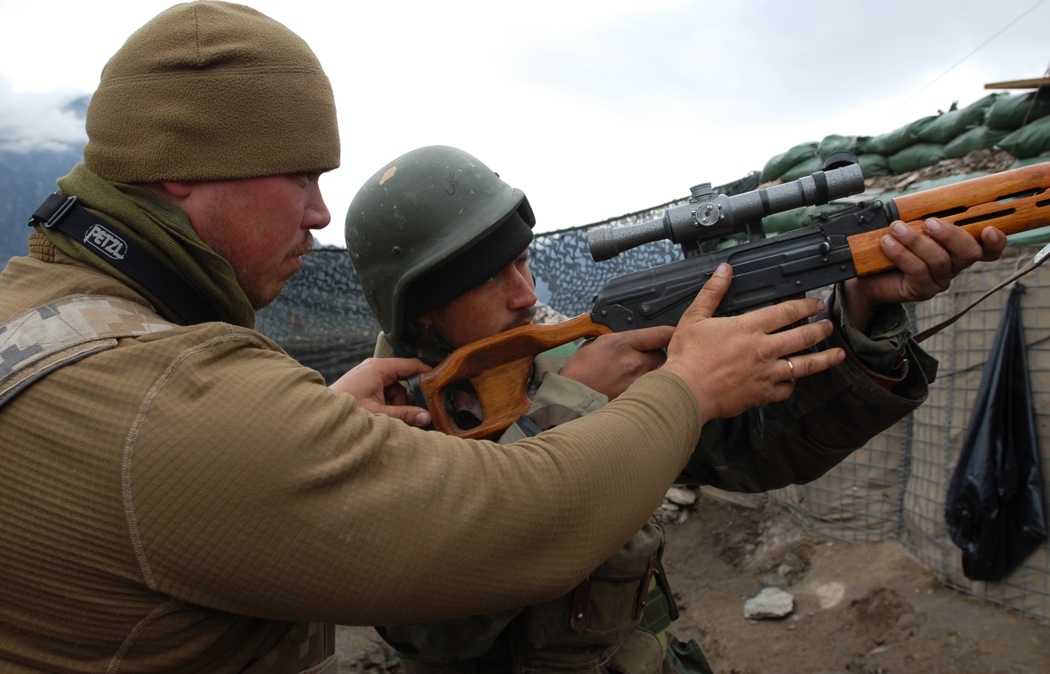
A Latvian Army Corporal shows an Afghan National Army Soldier how to use a Dragunov sniper rifle in Afghanistan.

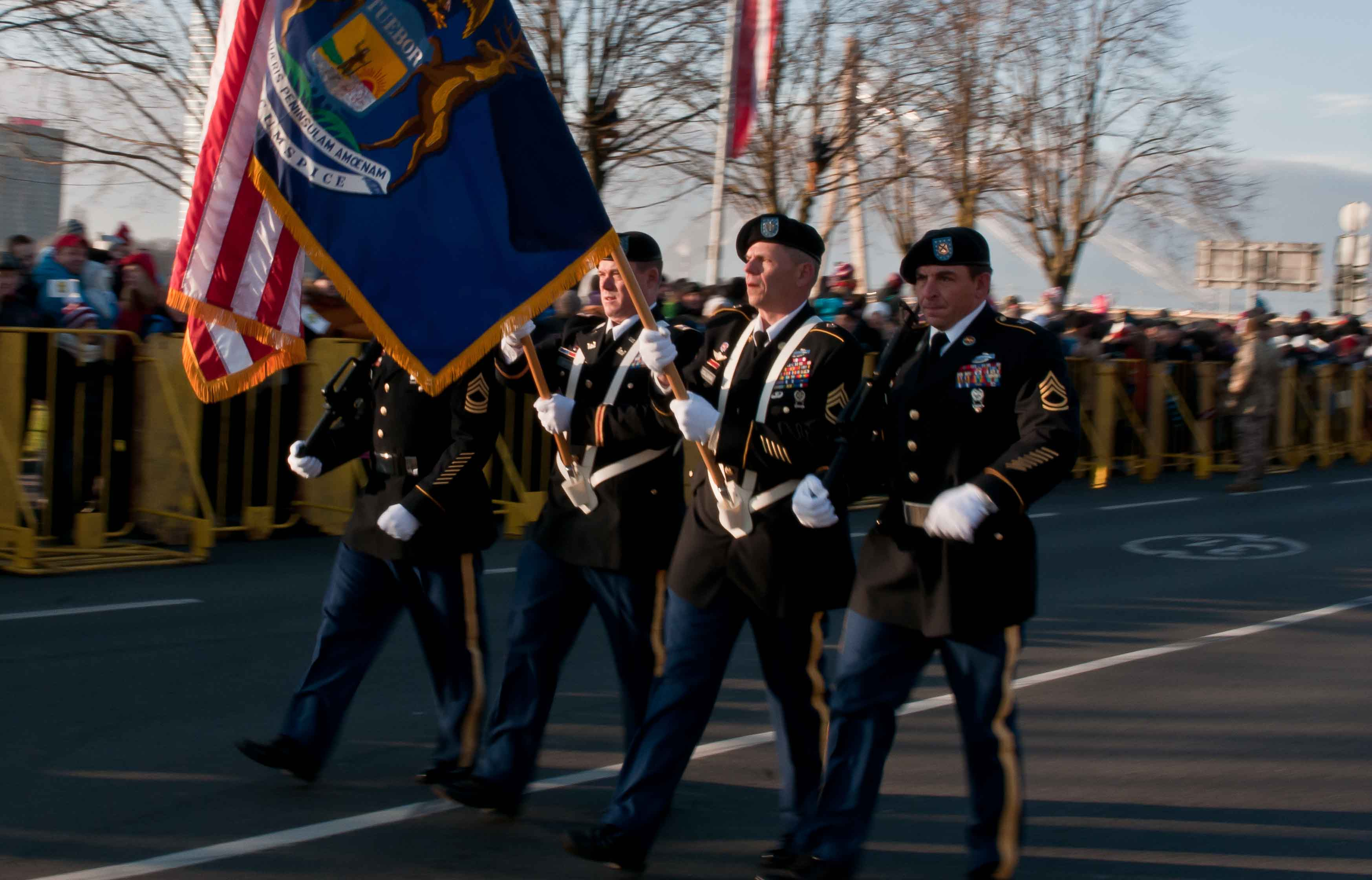
Michigan National Guard color guard participates in 2014 Latvian Independence Day parade in Riga.

== History ==
Latvia's accession to the EU and NATO occurred in 2004. The Economic crisis continues to affect Latvia. Their economy is the worst among the three Baltic States and one of the worst in all of Europe, but recovery is taking place. Major concerns are collective security, defense budget and regional defense. Latvia has close governmental ties with the Scandinavian and Nordic countries.

Latvia / MI deployed 3 Operational Mentoring and Liaison Teams (OMLT's) in 2008, 2009, and 2010. MI ANG trained first-ever NATO JTAC 's for OMLT's. In October 2010, Latvia hosted SABRE STRIKE, the largest ever joint US/NATO exercise in the Baltics, including 1,400 soldiers from Latvia, Lithuania, Estonia, Poland and the U.S. (USAREUR, USEUCOM, CONUS)

== Partnership focus ==
Military to Military:

- Continue development of JTAC program for NATO partners
- Assist in development of Lielvarde Air Base (under construction) through MI ANG SPP exchanges
- Continue to participate in NATO exercises, expeditionary operations and ISAF.
- Land Forces, at the direction of MG Raimonds Graube (CHOD) begins development of a "5-year plan" with the by-product of projecting future resource requirements
- Continue capacity building and development through utilization of SPP exchanges, Mobile Training Teams (MTT's) and major exercise participation
- Continue to develop partners Cyber Defense capability through TCT's and Joint Baltic Workshops.
