= Ināra Mūrniece =

Latvian journalist and politician

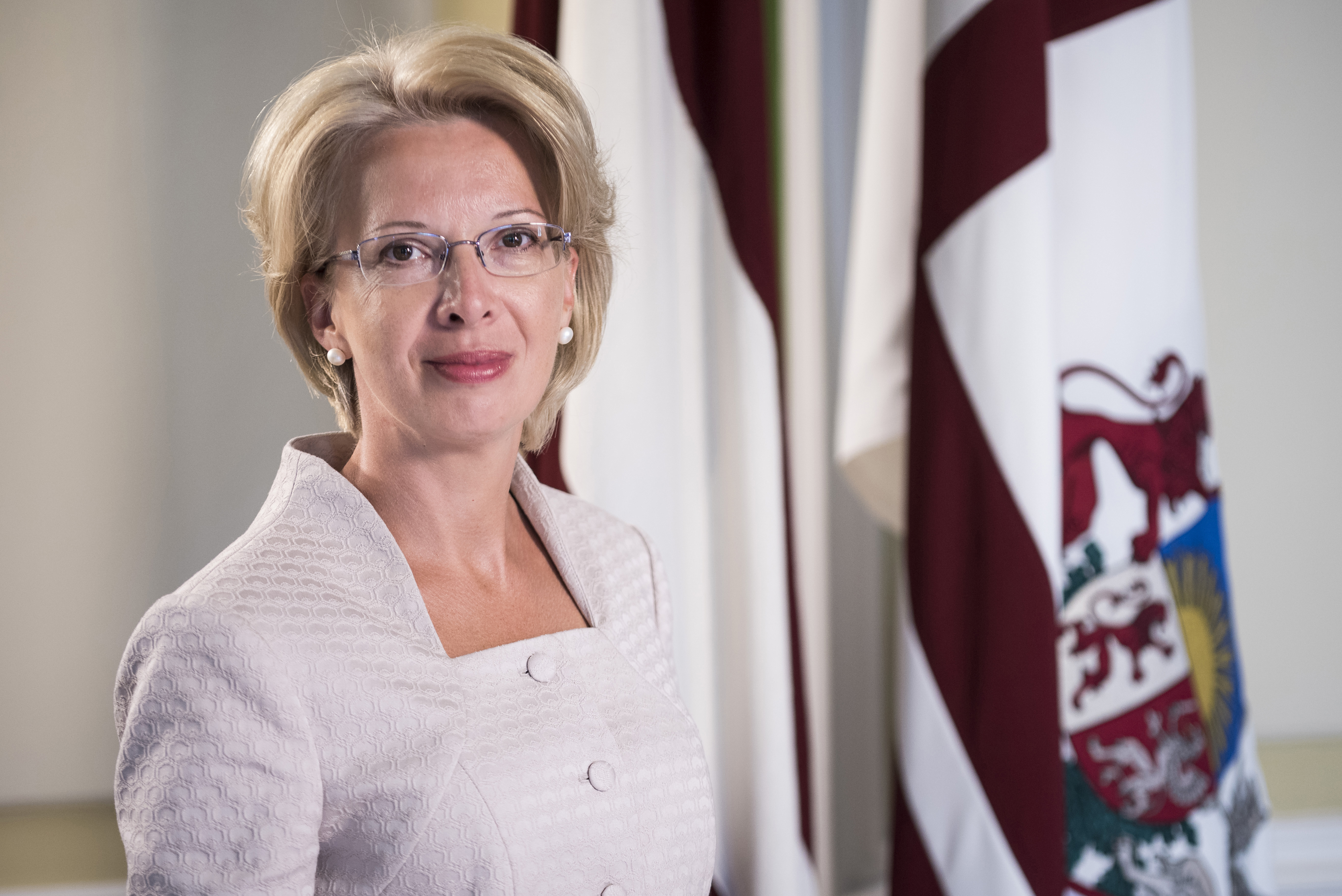
- Official portrait, 2016

Minister for Defence of Latvia
- In office 14 December 2022 – 15 September 2023
- Prime Minister: Arturs Krišjānis Kariņš
- Preceded by: Artis Pabriks
- Succeeded by: Andris Sprūds

Speaker of the Saeima
- In office 4 November 2014 – 1 November 2022
- Preceded by: Solvita Āboltiņa
- Succeeded by: Edvards Smiltēns

Member of the Saeima
- Incumbent
- Assumed office 17 October 2011

Personal details
- Born: 30 December 1970 (age 55)
- Party: National Alliance
- Spouse: Ritvars Jansons (m. 1995; div. 2015)
- Children: 1
- Education: University of Latvia

Ināra Mūrniece (born 30 December 1970) is a Latvian journalist, politician and a member of Saeima. She was Speaker of the Saeima from 2014 to 2022. In 2022, she was succeeded in that role by Edvards Smiltēns.

== Early life and professional career ==
In 2007, she graduated from the School of Economics and Culture and in 2009, graduated from the University of Latvia. She worked as a journalist for the newspaper Latvijas Avīze, stopped working there in August 2011.

== Elected office and public life ==
In 2011, Mūrniece ran in the 11th Saeima elections from the list of the National Aliance and was elected to the Saeima. She worked in the Saeima as the Chairperson of the Human Rights and Public Affairs Commission. In 2014, she was elected to the 12th Saeima and became the Speaker of the Saeima, and retained the position as Speaker throughout the 12th term of the Saeima.

She was elected to the 13th Saeima in the autumn of 2018. For the second term in a row, Mūrniece was elected Speaker of the Saeima, against Dagmāra Beitnere-Le Galla. Also, in next election in October 2022, she was reelected to 14th Saeima.

=== Defence minister ===
On 14 December 2022, Mūrniece became Minister of Defence of Latvia. She held that position until 15 September 2023, when Andris Sprūds succeeded her.

=== Chair of the Foreign Affairs Committee ===
On 20 June 2024, Mūrniece was appointed as the new chair of the Foreign Affairs Committee of the Saeima, after the former chair Rihards Kols became a member of the European Parliament.

In November 2024, Mūrniece was one of eight MPs from EU countries to visit Tbilisi and meet with president Salome Zourabichvili following allegations of fraud in the Georgian parliamentary election.

== Personal life ==
She was married to historian and politician Ritvars Jansons, who was a member of the 12th Saeima. They have a daughter. They divorced in 2015.

Political offices
Preceded by Solvita Āboltiņa	Speaker of the Saeima; 2014–2022	Succeeded by Edvards Smiltēns
