= Raivis Melnis =

Latvian politician (born 1977)

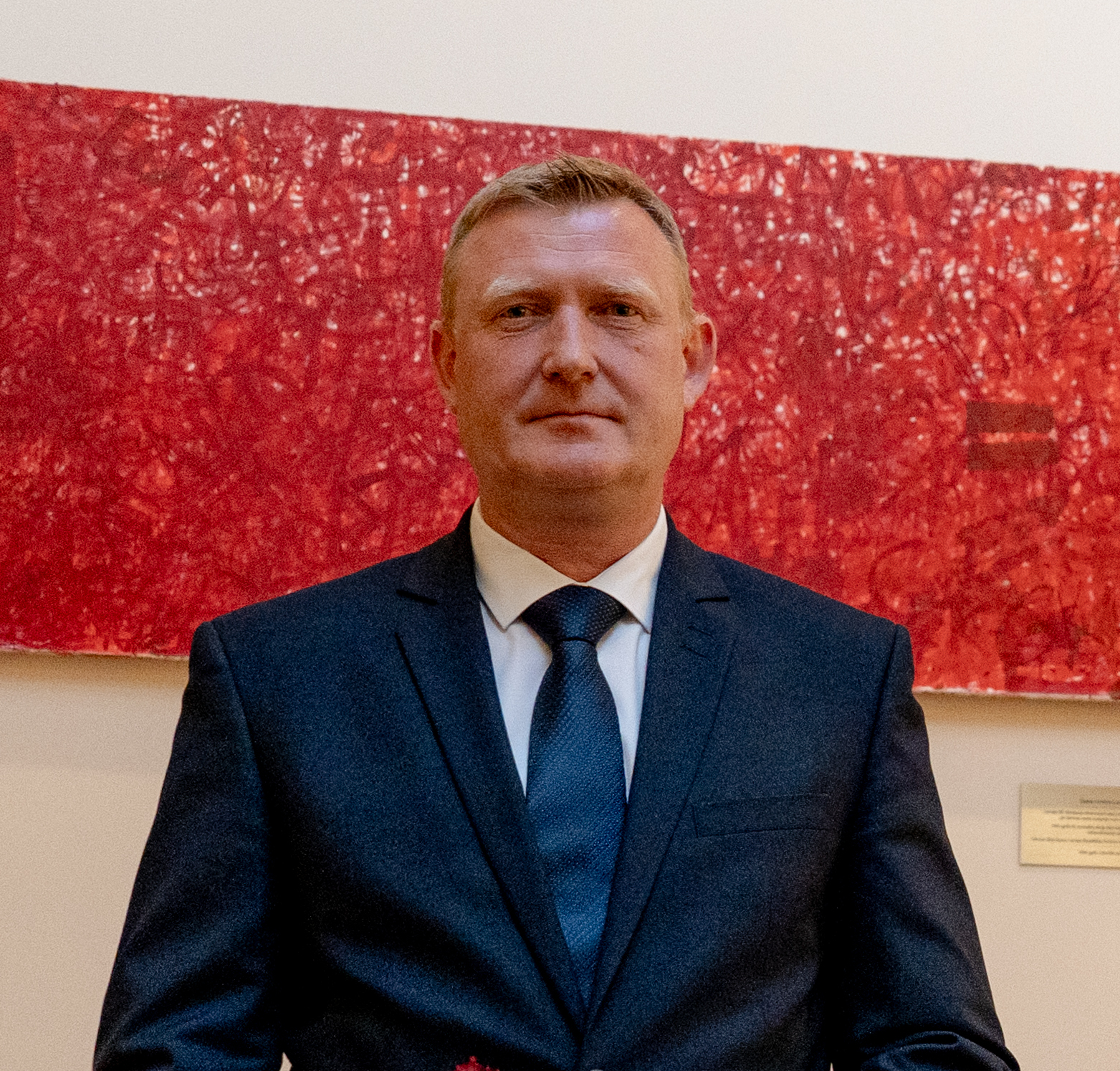

Minister of Defence
- Incumbent
- Assumed office 28 May 2026
- Prime Minister: Andris Kulbergs
- Preceded by: Andris Sprūds

Personal details
- Born: November 16, 1977 (age 48) Balvi, then part of Latvian SSR, Soviet Union
- Education: National Defence Academy of Latvia

Military service
- Branch/service: Latvia Armed Forces
- Rank: Colonel
- Awards: Order of Viesturs

Raivis Melnis (born November 16, 1977) is a Latvian military officer who has served as the Minister of Defence of Latvia since May 2026.

He was born November 16, 1977 in Balvi. From 1996 to 2000, he studied at the National Defence Academy of Latvia, obtaining a bachelor's degree in military leadership, and after studying at King's College London, he obtained a master's degree in international security and leadership. In July 2015, Melnis became the commander of the 1st Battalion of the Latvian Land Forces stationed at the Ādaži Training Area, and later served as the commander of the Baltic Battalion. He participated in several international operations in Afghanistan, and then served as the military attaché to Ukraine. In February 2026, Prime Minister Evika Siliņa appointed him as her advisor on military cooperation. On 10 May 2026, she invited Melnis replace Andris Sprūds, but this was stopped by the resignation of the government. On 28 May 2026, Melnis became the Minister of Defence in the government of Andris Kulbergs.
