= Dainis Īvāns =

Latvian journalist and politician

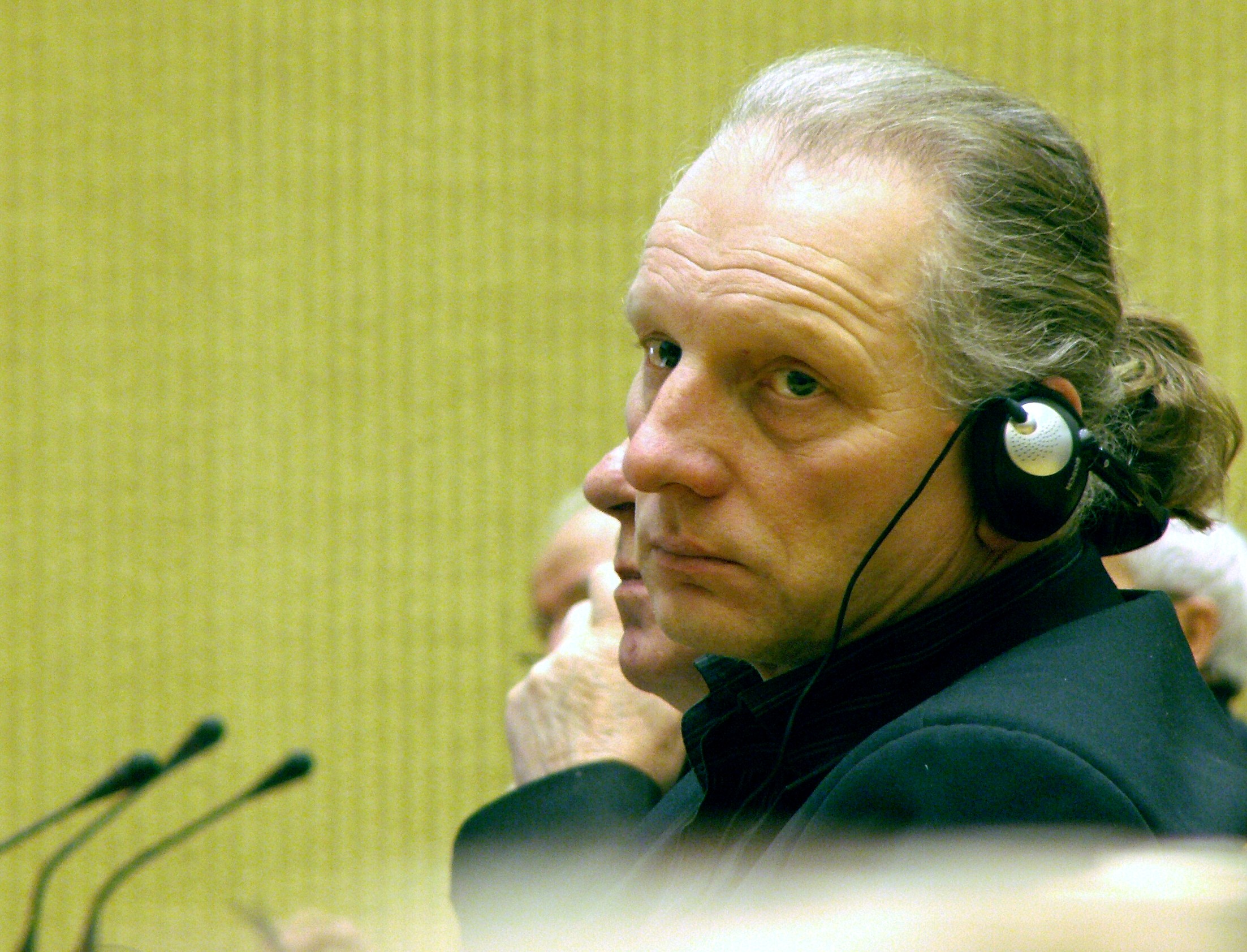
- Born: 25 September 1955 (age 70); Madona, Latvia
- Education: University of Latvia
- Occupations: Journalist, politician.
- Spouse: Elvīra Hrščenoviča

Dainis Īvāns (born 25 September 1955 in Madona) is a Latvian journalist and politician.

He has worked as a journalist since 1979 and gained public attention in 1986 by opposing construction of another hydro-electric dam on the Daugava river, near the city of Daugavpils. Īvāns highlighted the loss of landscapes and the relocation of numerous villages and towns required in the course of the dam's construction. As a result of the media campaign led by Īvāns, the construction of the dam was cancelled. He was awarded the title of Most Popular Journalist of 1986.

In 1988, he became one of founders of the Popular Front of Latvia and its leader. After the Popular Front victory in the 1990 election, he became the deputy speaker of the Supreme Council, the transitional parliament of Latvia. He resigned from this position in 1992.

He returned to politics in 1998, by joining the Latvian Social Democratic Workers' Party and was elected to Riga City Council from the Social Democrats' list in 2001. He was the leader of the Latvian Social Democratic Workers' Party from 2002 to 2005.
