= Latvian Unity Party =

Latvian political party

The Latvian Unity Party (Latvian: Latvijas Vienības partija), abbreviated to LVP was a left-wing political party in Latvia in the 1990s. Established in December 1992, the party primarily represented former communists.

The party ran a list of candidates in the 1993 election, but won only 0.1% of the vote: far below the 4% election threshold. It received a new lease of life when it was joined by Alberts Kauls, a celebrated leader of the former Ādaži collective farm. The party won eight seats in the Saeima at the 1995 election. It joined a grand coalition government under Andris Šķēle from 21 December 1995 to 13 February 1997. Initially, Alberts Kauls served as Deputy Prime Minister and Minister for Agriculture, but was made to resign by Šķēle on 6 May 1996, and his positions were given to fellow LVP member Roberts Dilba to hold until the fall of the coalition in February 1997. Most of its deputies left the party in March 1997, with most joining the Latvian Farmers' Union–Christian Democratic Union caucus in the Saeima. In the 1998 election, the party won no seats. The party was dissolved around 2001.
