= For Fatherland and Freedom/LNNK =

Latvian political party

For Fatherland and Freedom/LNNK Tēvzemei un Brīvībai/LNNK
- Leader: Roberts Zīle
- Founded: TB: 1 February 1993; TB/LNNK: 21 June 1997
- Dissolved: 3 December 2013
- Merged into: National Alliance
- Headquarters: Riga
- Ideology: National conservatism; Economic liberalism; Historical: Economic interventionism
- Political position: Right-wing
- European affiliation: AEN (2002–2009); AECR (2009–2011)
- European Parliament group: UEN (2004–2009); ECR Group (2009–2011)
- Colours: Maroon, white, and gold

Party flag

Website
- tb.lv

For Fatherland and Freedom/LNNK (Latvian: Tēvzemei un Brīvībai/LNNK, abbreviated to TB/LNNK) was a free-market, national conservative political party in Latvia. In 2011, it initiated a merger with All for Latvia! into the National Alliance, which was finalized on 3 December 2013.

The party was founded from smaller groups in 1993 as For Fatherland and Freedom (TB), with a focus on promoting the Latvian language and putting a cap on naturalisation of Latvian non-citizens. It won six Saeima seats in its first year, and 14 in 1995, when it entered the governing centre-right coalition. It merged with the more moderate Latvian National Independence Movement (LNNK) in 1997, and moved its emphasis to economic liberalisation. TB/LNNK's then-leader, Guntars Krasts, was Prime Minister from 1997 to 1998. It remained in government until 2004, and again from 2006.

Initially from the nationalist right, the party became more moderate after the 1997 merger. It also shifted from supporting economic interventionism to the free market. A predominantly ethnic Latvian party, the party's support base was university-educated, middle class, and concentrated in Riga. The party was soft Eurosceptic, and was a member of the anti-federalist Alliance of European Conservatives and Reformists. Its only MEP, party leader Roberts Zīle, sat with the ECR group in the European Parliament. It has caused some controversy with its participation in the Remembrance Day of the Latvian Legionnaires processions.

For the 2010 parliamentary election, it formed an alliance with the nationalist All for Latvia! party. In July 2011, both parties agreed to merge into a unitary party, bearing the name National Alliance, which was completed on 3 December 2013.

== History ==
=== Foundation ===
The roots of the party were in the 'Third Awakening' of the Latvian independence movement in the late 1980s. It identified with the part of the movement, which insisted on a full restoration of independence for Latvia and legal continuity with the Republic of Latvia that existed until 1940, when it was annexed by the Soviet Union.

It was closely affiliated with the Citizens' Congress through which an alternative government was created that claimed lineage from the interwar government. Within this structure, parties developed which continued after the restoration of independence in 1991. Two of these parties, the '18th November Union' and 'Fatherland', merged in 1993 to form the centre-right 'For Fatherland and Freedom' (Latvian: Tēvzemei un Brīvībai or TB). The new party took its name from the inscription on the Freedom Monument, and its focus was on undoing the effects of the Soviet occupation, especially promoting the Latvian language and tightening citizenship laws. The party took part in the 1993 election to the Saeima, and won six seats. A party with a similar background, the Latvian National Independence Movement (LNNK), won fifteen seats.

=== Merger and referendums ===
TB was the leading force behind two referendum proposals (in 1994 and 1998) to make Latvian citizenship laws stricter. In 1994, the proposition did not gather the necessary number of voter signatures. Before the 1995 election, TB signed a prospective coalition agreement, the centre-right 'National Bloc', with the LNNK and the Latvian Farmers' Union, and presented a more rounded programme, based on the LNNK's, although still concentrating on national identity issues. The party jumped to fourteen seats, becoming one of the four major parties in the Saeima, and leap-frogging the LNNK (which suffered a split from the secession of the populist right under Joachim Siegerist) as the main right-wing party. The party fell just short of a majority, with leader Māris Grīnblats's right-wing coalition securing the support of 49 out of 100 deputies for the premiership. Instead, a broad centre-right coalition was formed with TB controlling four ministries under PM Andris Šķēle.

In 1997, the TB merged with the LNNK to form 'For Fatherland and Freedom/LNNK', also known as the 'Conservative Union'. In 1998, the proposal was defeated in a referendum, by a relatively small margin (45% of voters supporting the change and 52% rejecting it). At the end of the 1990s and the early 2000s, the party shifted its focus to economic issues.

=== Government ===
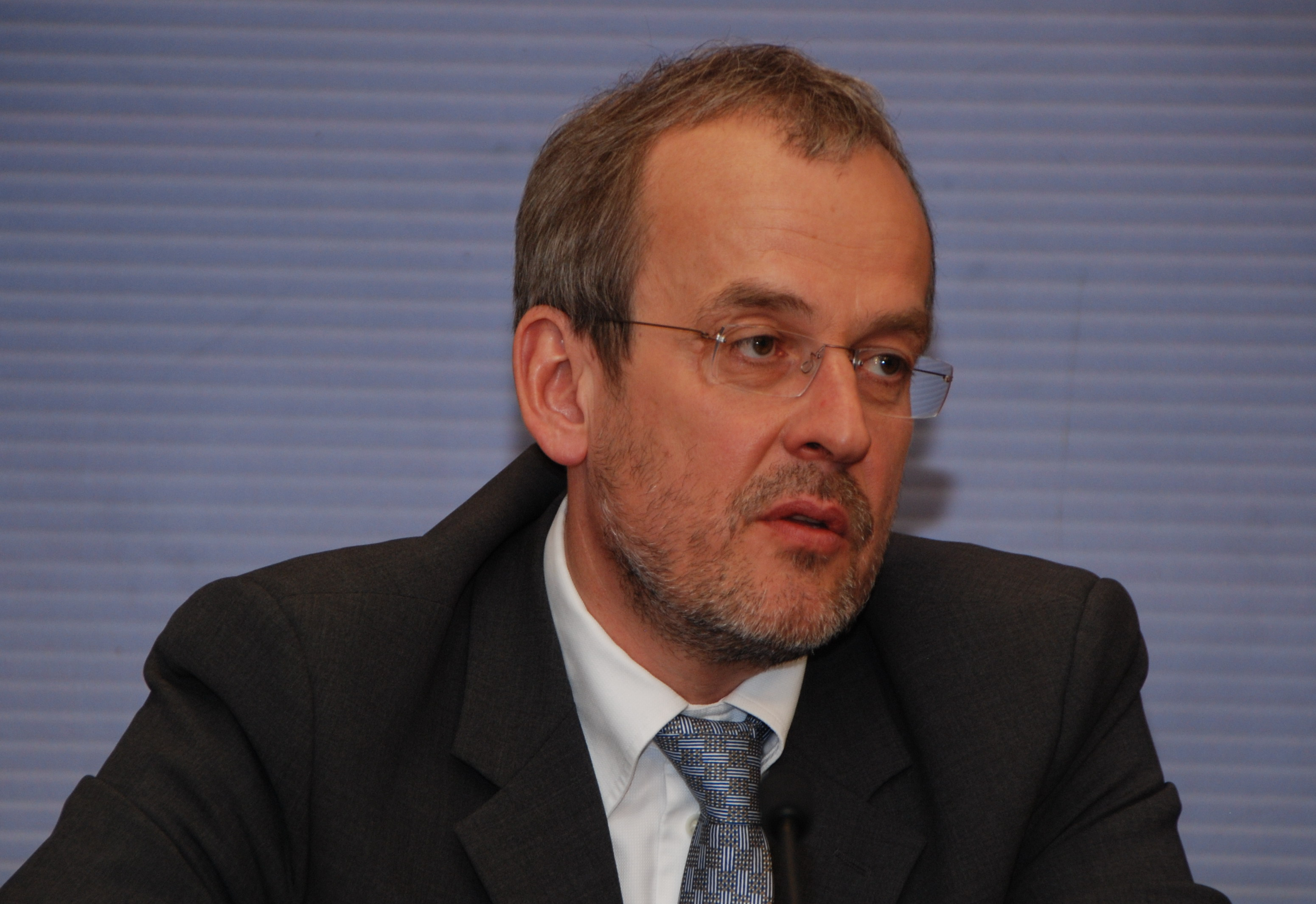
Roberts Zīle, party leader from 2006–2011 served in the government from 1997 to 2004, and was TB/LNNK's candidate for Prime Minister in 2006 and 2010.

"For Fatherland and Freedom" was a part of coalition governments from December 1995 to February 2004. From 1997 to 1998, its representative, Guntars Krasts, was the prime minister. From February 2004 until November 2006, the party was in opposition. Although it only gained 8 seats in the 2006 election, the party was invited to become part of the ruling coalition in the Kalvītis cabinet, and it agreed to join. Gaidis Bērziņš became Minister of Justice, Jurijs Strods Minister of Economics, and Normunds Broks Minister for Special Assignments for Cooperation with EU Financial Institutions.

"For Fatherland and Freedom" campaigned as a strong supporter of Latvia's national interests and opponent of a federal Europe. "For Fatherland and Freedom" won 29% of votes and 4 of Latvia's 9 seats in the 2004 European Parliament election. In the 2009 European election, the party won 7.5% of the vote and retained one of its four seats in the European Parliament.

The party attempted to join the centre-right Unity electoral alliance in 2010, but was rejected. Instead, it joined with the populist radical right All for Latvia! to form the electoral alliance National Alliance (Nacionālā Apvienība). In the 2010 election, the National Alliance won eight seats, with All for Latvia! winning six of them and TB/LNNK reduced to two. Unity invited the electoral alliance to join the coalition, but the offer was withdrawn a few days later after the Society for Political Change, one of the parties making up Unity, vetoed the option.

In July 2011, both components of the National Alliance agreed to re-organize the National Alliance as a unitary party under the same name.On TB/LNNK's 17th and last delegate conference, 84 of 90 party representatives agreed with the merger, 3 opposed and 3 abstained.

== Ideology ==
Constitutionally, the party treated the post-1991 Republic of Latvia not as a successor to the inter-war republic, but as a continuation, and considered all acts of the Latvian Soviet Socialist Republic illegitimate. The party opposed the naturalisation of the large population of Soviet-era migrants (Latvian: nepilsoņi) that live in Latvia. The party's stance towards the Soviet era lead Guntars Krasts's government to make the Remembrance Day of the Latvian Legionnaires a public holiday, and its members to celebrate the Latvian Legion, part of the Waffen-SS.

The party was an advocate of the free market. The party's position shifted over time from interventionism to liberalisation. Originally, the party based its Statism on the heavy interventionism of the inter-war republic. Of TB/LNNK's predecessors, For Fatherland and Freedom was more sceptical of the free market, while the LNNK supported full privatisation, within the context of a welfare state and protectionism. After the merger, the party adopted free market economics as one of its main emphases, advocating a swift transition to a market economy.

The party held an anti-federal Europe, soft Eurosceptic position. It was the only centre-right party to have considered opposing membership of the European Union before Latvian accession. In March 2003, it changed to supporting membership, fearing that voting no would cause the country to lose support for economic reforms and security policy. The party campaigned in favour of accession in the November 2003 referendum.

The party was a strong advocate for the Latvian language. For example, it introduced a law mandating the public sector to ignore communication in any other language.

At the European Commission against Racism and Intolerance high-level panel meeting in 2005, Jean-Yves Camus, a French political scientist, described the party as "on the borderline between conservative right and far-right" and "an ultra-nationalist party comparable in some respects to the far right".

== Political support ==
A major cleavage in Latvian politics is between ethnic Latvians, from whom TB/LNNK received almost all of its votes, and ethnic Russians. In the 1998 election, ethnic Latvians were fifteen times as likely to vote for the party as ethnic Russians. The 1998 referendum on citizenship sponsored by TB/LNNK was supported by a majority of Latvians, but defeated overall by opposition from ethnic Russians.

The party was supported mostly by the middle class, with wealthier voters tending to vote either for TB/LNNK or Latvian Way. Before the parties merged in 1997, both TB and the LNNK received the most support from university graduates.

Riga was traditionally the party's strongest area, with 40% of its voters in 1995 coming from the capital city. However, Riga's politics had started to shift from an ethno-linguistic cleavage to a socio-economic one, leading to a softening of this disparity in the 2001 municipal election.

Unlike most parties in Latvia, TB/LNNK never based its support on having a particularly populist leader.

== International relations and criticism ==
The party was a member of the Alliance of European Conservatives and Reformists (AECR), allying with amongst others, the British Conservative Party, Polish Law and Justice, and the Czech Civic Democratic Party. They sat with the AECR's group, the European Conservatives and Reformists, in the European Parliament. Until 2009, TB/LNNK was a member of the Alliance for Europe of the Nations and sat with the UEN group.

In 2009, British foreign secretary David Miliband criticized Conservative Chairman Eric Pickles' decision to secure an alliance with TB/LNNK in the ECR group "despite the fact that its members attend commemorations for the Waffen-SS". In a response, William Hague demanded an apology be made to TB/LNNK and the Latvian government from Miliband, describing his remarks as recycling "false Soviet propaganda" and noting that "the majority of parties forming Latvia’s current Government including the Prime Minister’s party, have attended the commemoration of Latvians who fought in the Second World War".

The Israeli historian and Nazi-hunter Efraim Zuroff, head of the Simon Wiesenthal Center's office in Jerusalem, criticized the party's "obsession with paying public homage to the Latvian-SS Legion in contradiction to all historical logic and sensitivity to Nazi crimes" in a column for The Guardian on 28 September 2009, while University of Vilnius professor Dovid Katz, writing that the British Conservatives must not be let "off the hook for their dalliances with some of the worst racists and Holocaust perverters in eastern Europe," called for Pickles' resignation as chairman in October 2009.

== Electoral performance ==
Electoral performance of TB/LNNK in the Saeima. TB/LNNK is in gold, as is its predecessor For Fatherland and Freedom. The performance of LNNK is in red (1993 and 1995) and that of All for Latvia! in maroon (2010).

== Leaders ==
=== Party chairmen ===
- Māris Grīnblats (1997–2002)
- Jānis Straume (2002–2006)
- Roberts Zīle (2006–2011)

=== Saeima faction presidents ===
- Jānis Straume (1997–2002)
- Māris Grīnblats (2002–2010)

== Bibliography ==
- Bennich-Björkman, Li; Johansson, Karl Magnus (December 2012). "Explaining moderation in nationalism: Divergent trajectories of national conservative parties in Estonia and Latvia". Comparative European Politics. 10 (5): 585–607. doi:10.1057/cep.2011.28. S2CID 256522065.
- Smith-Silvertsen, Hermann (2004). "Latvia". In Berglund, Sten; Ekman, Joakim Aarebrot, Frank H. (eds.). The Handbook of Political Change in Eastern Europe. Edward Elgar Publishing. ISBN 978-1-84064-854-6.
- Eglitis, Daina Stukuls (2002). Imagining the Nation: History, Modernity, and Revolution in Latvia. Philadelphia: Penn State Press. ISBN 978-0-271-02203-1.
- Plakans, Andrejs (1997). "Democratization and political participation in postcommunist societies: the case of Latvia". In Dawisha, Karen; Parrott, Bruce (eds.). The Consolidation of Democracy in East-Central Europe. Cambridge: Cambridge University Press. ISBN 978-0-521-59938-2.
- Szczerbiak, Aleks; Taggart, Paul, eds. (2005). EU Enlargement and Referendums. London: Routledge. ISBN 978-0-415-36007-4.

== See also ==
- List of political parties in Latvia
