= 1995 Latvian parliamentary election =

Parliamentary election held in Latvia

← 1993	30 September – 1 October 1995	1998 →
- All 100 seats in the Saeima; 51 seats needed for a majority
- Turnout: 72.65% ▼ (18.53 pp)
Party	Leader	Vote %	Seats	+/–
DPS	Ziedonis Čevers	15.22	18	New
TKL	Joachim Siegerist	14.97	16	New
LC	Māris Gailis	14.71	17	−19
TB	Guntars Krasts	11.99	14	+8
LVP	Alberts Kauls	7.18	8	+8
LZS-LKDS-LDP	Jānis Kinna	6.36	8	−10
NKP-ZP	Aleksandrs Kiršteins	6.35	6	−9
LSP	Filips Stroganovs	5.61	5	New
TSP	Jānis Jurkāns	5.58	6	−7
This lists parties that won seats. See the complete results below.
Results by district
Prime Minister before	Prime Minister after
Māris Gailis; Latvian Way	Andris Šķēle; Independent

Parliamentary elections were held in Latvia on 30 September and 1 October 1995. The Democratic Party "Saimnieks" emerged as the largest party in the Saeima, winning 18 of the 100 seats.

== Results ==
Party	Votes	%	Seats	+/–
Democratic Party "Saimnieks"	144,758	15.22	18	New
People's Movement for Latvia	142,324	14.97	16	New
Latvian Way	139,929	14.71	17	–19
For Fatherland and Freedom	114,050	11.99	14	+8
Latvian Unity Party	68,305	7.18	8	+8
ZS–LKDS–LDP	60,498	6.36	8	–10
NKP–ZP	60,352	6.35	8	New
Socialist Party of Latvia	53,325	5.61	5	New
National Harmony Party	53,041	5.58	6	–7
Labour and Justice Coalition	43,599	4.58	0	New
Political Union of Economists	14,209	1.49	0	New
Latvian Farmers' Union	13,009	1.37	0	–12
Party of Russian Citizens in Latvia	11,924	1.25	0	0
Popular Front of Latvia	11,090	1.17	0	0
Political Association of the Underprivileged and Latvian Independence Party	9,468	1.00	0	New
Citizens Union "Our Land" – Anti-Communist Union	5,050	0.53	0	0
Democrats' Party	2,546	0.27	0	New
Latvian Liberal Party	2,163	0.23	0	0
Latvian National Democratic Party	1,367	0.14	0	New
Total	951,007	100.00	100	0
Valid votes	951,007	98.52		
Invalid/blank votes	14,332	1.48		
Total votes	965,339	100.00		
Registered voters/turnout	1,328,779	72.65		
Source: Nohlen & Stöver

== Aftermath ==
Both parties of government, Latvian Way and Latvian Farmers' Union were punished by the voters, losing a substantial number of seats. With no party able to form a working majority, a new government was formed led by independent Andris Šķēle.
