= List of chairmen of the Supreme Soviet of the Latvian Soviet Socialist Republic =

The chairman of the Supreme Soviet of the Latvian Soviet Socialist Republic was the presiding officer of that legislature. It is not to be confused with the chairman of the Presidium of the Latvian Soviet Socialist Republic, a superior position in the Soviet state apparatus.

Name	Period
Pēteris Briedis	August 25, 1940 – March 14, 1947
Aleksandrs Mazjēcis	March 14, 1947 – October 14, 1948
Pēteris Zvaigzne	October 14, 1948 – 1955
Edgars Apinis	March 24, 1955 – March 30, 1957
Jānis Vanags	June 5, 1957 – March 20, 1963
Pēteris Vāleskalns	March 20, 1963 – July 7, 1971
Aleksandrs Malmeisters	July 7, 1971 – July 3, 1975
Valentīna Klibiķe	July 3, 1975 – March 29, 1985
Aleksandrs Drīzulis	March 29, 1985 – July 27, 1989
Anatolijs Gorbunovs	July 27, 1989 – May 3, 1990

== Chairman of the Supreme Council of (from May 4, 1990) the Republic of Latvia ==
Name	Period
Anatolijs Gorbunovs	May 3, 1990 – July 8, 1993
