= Andris Sprūds =

Latvian politician

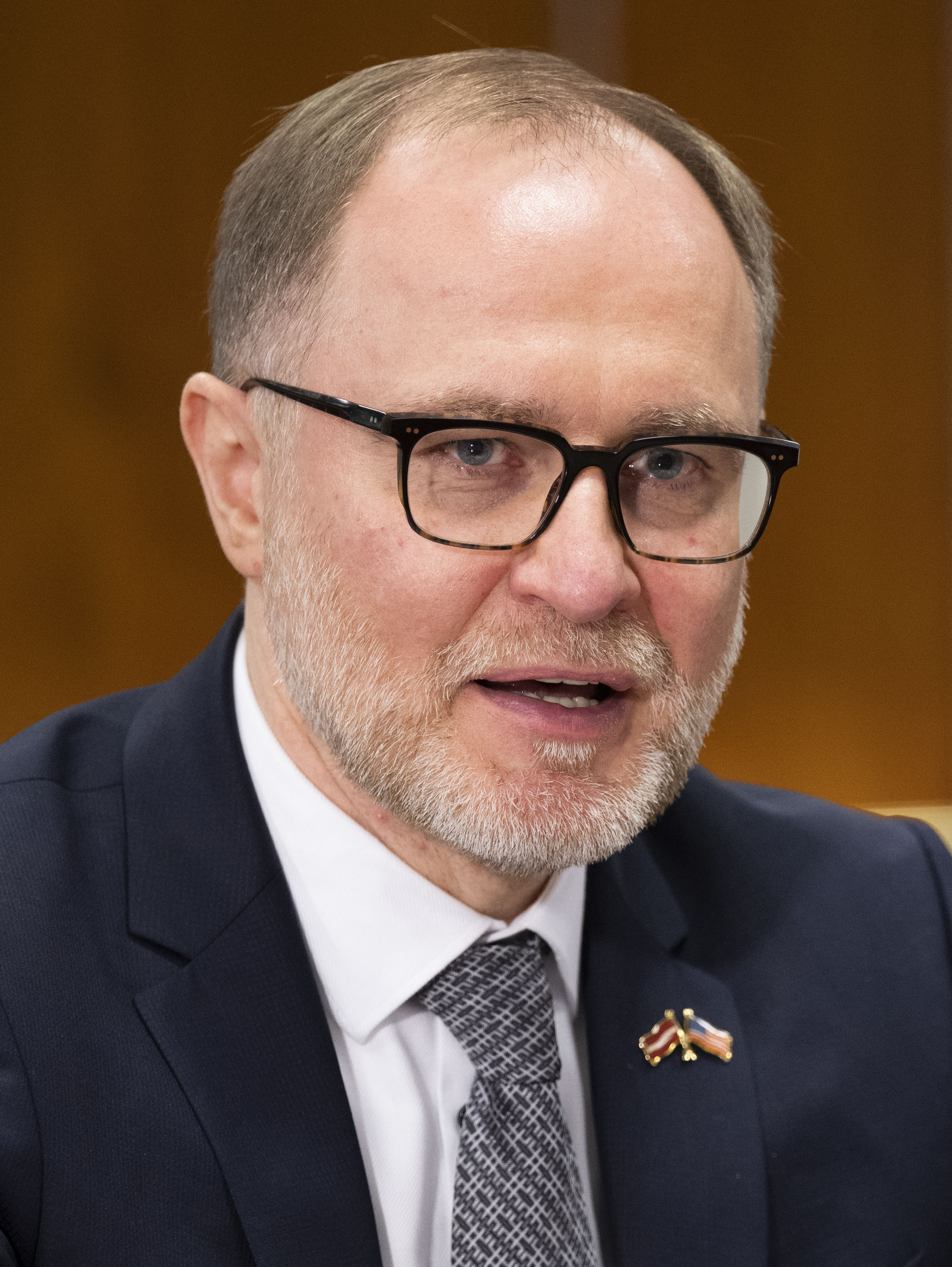
- Sprūds in 2024

Minister of Defence
- In office 15 September 2023 – 11 May 2026
- Prime Minister: Evika Siliņa
- Preceded by: Ināra Mūrniece
- Succeeded by: Raivis Melnis

Member of the 14th Saeima
- In office 1 November 2022 – 20 September 2023

Personal details
- Born: 13 July 1971 (age 55) Liepāja, Latvia
- Party: Progressives (since 2023)
- Education: Central European University (1997); University of Latvia (1998); Jagiellonian University (2005)
- Profession: Foreign policy researcher, lecturer

Andris Sprūds(born 13 July 1971) is a Latvian foreign policy researcher, lecturer, and politician. He is a professor at Rīga Stradiņš University, a member of the 14th Saeima, and former Minister of Defence of Latvia. He represents the Progressives party.

== Personal life ==
In 1997, he obtained a master's degree in Central European history from Central European University in Budapest, and in 1998, a master's degree in political science in international relations from University of Latvia, and in 2005, he defended his doctoral degree in political science at Jagiellonian University in Krakow, Poland. He has also studied and researched at Columbia University, Johns Hopkins University, University of Oxford, Uppsala University, the Norwegian Institute of International Affairs, and the Japan Institute of Energy Economics on various topics related to energy security and policy in the Baltic Sea region, post-Soviet domestic and foreign policy, as well as transatlantic relations.

He has been a member of the advisory board of the Latvian Institute of International Affairs and its director.

== Political career ==
On 1 October 2022, Sprūds was elected to the 14th Saeima from the list of the Progressives party, not being its member. He works in the Foreign Affairs and European Affairs Committees of the Saeima. On 24 November 2022, he was elected chairman of the European Affairs Committee of the Saeima. In 2023, he joined the Progressives party.

On 15 September 2023, he was appointed Minister of Defence in the cabinet of Evika Siliņa. Sprūds resigned on 10 May 2026 after a drone incursion incident, with Colonel Raivis Melnis taking his place, this may change after Progressives talk to Prime Minister. It is also possible that the Saeima will not elect Raivis Melnis a new Minister of Defense.
