= 1998 Latvian citizenship referendum =

3 October 1998
- Are you in favor of repealing the 22 June 1998 amendments to the Easier Naturalization Act?

Results
Choice	Votes	%
Yes	416,584	46.08%
No	487,559	53.92%
Valid votes	904,143	97.43%
Invalid or blank votes	23,897	2.57%
Total votes	928,040	100.00%
Registered voters/turnout	1,341,873	69.16%

A referendum on the citizenship law was held in Latvia on 3 October 1998. The Saeima had made amendments to the law in June that increased the opportunities for naturalisation and provided the additional option of obtaining Latvian citizenship for non-citizens (nepilsoņi) and stateless persons (bezvalstnieki) born in Latvia from August 1991 onwards. Voters were asked "are you for or against the repeal of the law "Amendments in the Law of Citizenship"". A majority of 53.9% voted against repealing the law.

== Results ==
Choice	Votes	%
For	416,584	46.1
Against	487,559	53.9
Invalid/blank votes	23,897	–
Total	928,040	100
Registered voters/turnout	1,341,873	69.2
Source: Nohlen & Stöver
