= National Defence Academy of Latvia =

Military academy in Riga, Latvia

Coordinates: 56.9946°N 24.1777°E

- Latvijas Nacionālā aizsardzības akadēmija
- Established: 1992; 33 years ago
- Rector: Colonel Oskars Kudlis
- Address: Ezermalas iela 8, Riga, Latvia
- Website: http://www.naa.mil.lv/

The National Defence Academy of Latvia (Latvian: Latvijas Nacionālā aizsardzības akadēmija) is a defense academy of higher education and scientific research in Riga, Latvia. It was established on February 13, 1992, as the Academy of the Ministry of Defense of the Republic of Latvia. It builds on the historic traditions of the pre-WWII Latvian School of War (Latvijas Kara skola). It is the only military academy in Latvia. The Latvian Armed Forces also contribute to and utilize the Baltic Defence College in Tartu.

== Programs ==
Programs are divided as follows:

- Professional bachelor's degree
  - Land Force Military Leadership
  - Naval Force Military Leadership
  - Air Force Military Leadership
- Professional higher education study
  - Commanding officer training
- Professional master's study program
  - Professional master's degree in military leadership and security

== Rectors ==
The Following have served as academy rectors:

- Col. Valdis Matīss (30/03/1992 - 27/02/1998)
- Lt. Col. Ilmārs Vīksne (27/02/1998 - 03/04/2001)
- Lt. Col. Juris Maklakovs (03/04/2001 - 13/05/2004)
- Brig.-Gen. Kārlis Krēsliņš (14/05/2004 - 27/05/2005)
- Lt. Col. Gunārs Upītis (28/05/2005 - 28/09/2007)
- Capt. Vladimirs Dreimanis (28/09/2007 - 30/06/2010)
- Col. Andris Kalniņš (30/06/2010 - 10/05/2011)
- Col. Egils Leščinskis (10/05/2011 - 19/06/2015)
- Lt. Col. Georgs Kerlins (19/06/2015 - 29/08/2017)
- Col. Valts Āboliņš (29/08/2017 - 14/07/2020)
- Col. Oskars Kudlis (since 14/07/2020)
