= Joachim Siegerist =

German journalist and politician (born 1947)

Werner Joachim Siegerist (born Werner-Joachim Bierbrauer; 29 January 1947 – 28 January 2023) was a German-Latvian journalist, author and conservative politician. He was chairman of the anti-communist German Conservatives and co-publisher of the Konservative Deutsche Zeitung. He played a role in the early days of renewed Latvian independence following the collapse of the Soviet Union.

Siegerist was born in Neukirchen (Nordfriesland). His father was Latvian and his mother was originally from Wiesbaden and later moved to Schleswig-Holstein, where he grew up. He was active in the Junge Union and the Christlicher Gewerkschaftsbund. Between 1971 and 1973 he was a prominent journalist for the Bild-Zeitung, the biggest newspaper in Europe. In 1980 he founded the Bürgeraktion Demokraten für Strauß and campaigned for the candidacy of Franz Josef Strauss for Chancellor. Following Strauss's defeat, he became the leading reporter of the HÖRZU, a magazine also published by the Axel Springer Verlag. In 1985 he left Springer over political differences, and wrote his first book, Willy Brandt - Das Ende einer Legende. For that book, he was sentenced for slander of Willy Brandt 1987. 1994 he was let off for probation on slander and sedition after calling Gypsies throughout evil and criminal mob.

Following the liberation of the Baltic countries from Soviet occupation, he became a Latvian citizen in 1992 and was elected to the Saeima at the 1993 election for the Latvian National Independence Movement (LNNK), which became an influential party. The same year he was a member of a coalition whose candidate Ziedonis Čevers was nominated to become Latvian Prime Minister, but lost the vote in parliament by only one vote and ended up second. He later claimed that some MPs had been paid off by his adversaries. The leader of the popular election, who was a friend of Siegerist, also allegedly committed suicide, but Siegerist suspect he was murdered.

Siegerist was ejected from the LNNK group in 1994. In response, he founded the People's Movement for Latvia (Tautas kustība "Latvijai"), also known as the 'Siegerist Party' (Zīgerista partija) due to its reliance on its leader's personality. At the 1995 election, the party won sixteen seats: twice as many as the LNNK and its Latvian Green Party allies put together, and tried to form a government with the left-wing opposition parties.

He has written several books that have sold several million copies.
