= Anatolijs Gorbunovs =

Latvian politician

- Anatolijs Gorbunovs
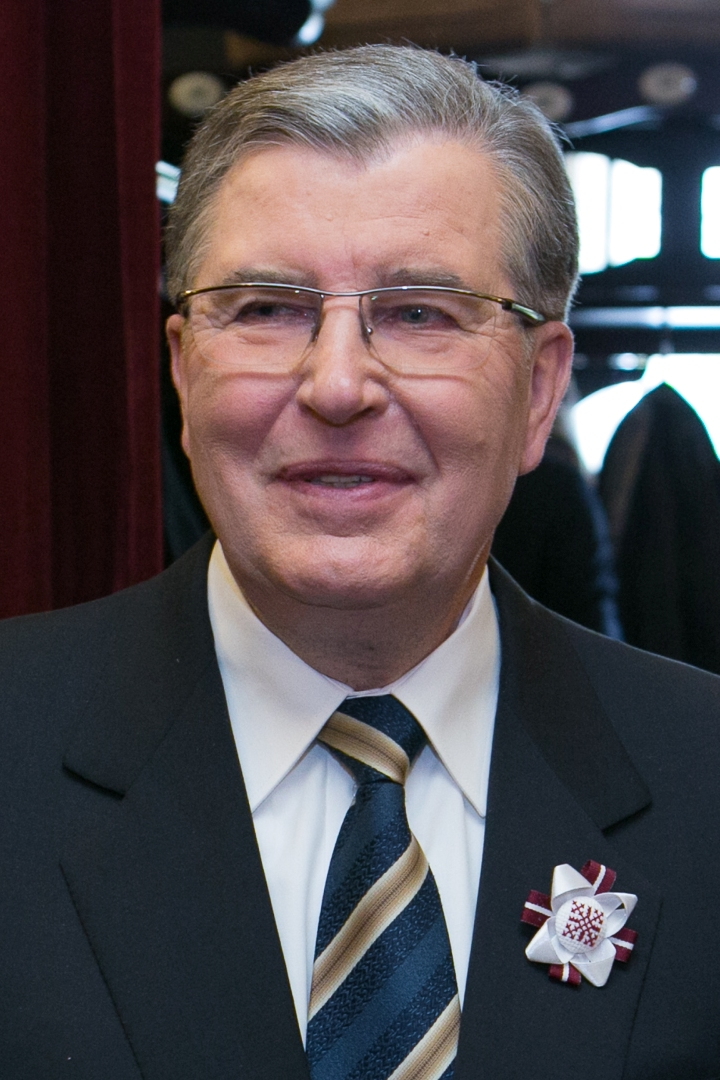
- Gorbunovs in 2015

Speaker of the Saeima
- In office 6 July 1993 – 7 November 1995
- Preceded by: Position established (Himself as Chairman of the Supreme Council)
- Succeeded by: Ilga Kreituse

Chairman of the Supreme Council
- In office 3 May 1990 – 6 July 1993
- Preceded by: Position established (Himself as Chairman of the Supreme Soviet)
- Succeeded by: Position abolished (Himself as Speaker of the Saeima; Guntis Ulmanis as President of Latvia)

Chairman of the Supreme Soviet
- In office 27 July 1989 – 3 May 1990
- Preceded by: Aleksandrs Drīzulis
- Succeeded by: Position abolished (Himself as Chairman of the Supreme Council)

Personal details
- Born: 10 February 1942 (age 84) Pilda Parish, Reichskommissariat Ostland
- Party: Latvian Way
- Other political affiliations: Communist Party of Latvia (until 1991)

Anatolijs Gorbunovs (born 10 February 1942), is a Latvian politician who served as the head of state of Latvia from 1989 to 1993. He was the l Chairman of the Supreme Soviet from 1989 to 1990, during the final years of the Soviet regime in Latvia. He then served as Chairman of the Supreme Council of Latvia from 1990 to 1993, after the country regained its independence.

After the election of the Fifth Saeima in 1993, he continued to serve as the Speaker of the Saeima until 1995.

== Early life ==
He was born on February 10, 1942 in Pilda Parish (now Ludza Municipality) in the family of farmer Valerīnas Gorbunovs. From 1962–1965, he served in the Soviet Armed Forces. In 1970 he graduated from the Riga Polytechnic Institute, and in 1978 from the Academy of Social Sciences under the Central Committee of the CPSU. In 1959 he worked at the Nikrāce state farm in the Skrunda district of the Latvian SSR, the Latgiproselstroi institute and the RPI. From 1969-1970, he was secretary of the RPI Komsomol committee, then first secretary of the Kirov district committee of the Leninist Communist Youth League of Latvia (LKSM) in Riga.

== Political career ==
From 1974 to 1988, he held various positions in the Communist Party of Latvia, with his highest position being the Secretary of the Central Committee. Unlike many other Communist Party members in Latvia, Gorbunovs supported the Latvian independence movement. From 1988 to 1990 he was also Chairman of the Presidium of the Supreme Soviet. In 1990, he presided over a session of the Supreme Soviet that declared the Soviet Union an occupying power, voided Latvia's accession to the Soviet Union, and began a transitional period to independence. Gorbunovs remained as chairman of the body, renamed the Supreme Council of Latvia, until 1993. When Latvian independence was restored de facto in 1991, as speaker of the parliament, Gorbunovs became acting State President per the 1922 Constitution until 1993, when Guntis Ulmanis was elected president.

Gorbunovs joined the Latvian Way party in 1993 and was elected as Speaker of the Saeima, a post he held until 1995. He remained a member of parliament until 2002. Between 1995 and 2002, he served as Minister of Regional Development, Minister of Transportation and Deputy Prime Minister.

== Post-politics ==
From 2003 to 2009, he was the Chairman of the Council of the state joint-stock company “Latvijas valsts meži".

== Personal life ==
He is married, with a son and a grandson. He speaks Latvian, Russian, and English.

== Awards ==
- Order of the Badge of Honour (USSR, 1981)
- Certificate of Honor of the Presidium of the Supreme Council of the Latvian SSR
- Honorary Member of the University of Latvia (1991)
- Order of the Three Stars, 2nd Class (1995)
- Order of the Dannebrog, Commander 1st Class (Denmark, 1997)
- Order of the Cross of Terra Mariana, 1st Class (Estonia, 2002)
- Medal of the Baltic Assembly (2011)
- The Cicero Award (Latvian: Cicerona balva) of the Latvian Academy of Sciences (2012)

Political offices
Preceded by Kārlis Ulmanis (Note: Upon the expiration of Kviesis's term, Prime minister Kārlis Ulmanis illegally merged the Presidency and the Premiership, holding both offices himself. After the Soviet occupation Prime Minister Augusts Kirhenšteins was the illegitimate Acting President from 21 July to 25 August 1940)	Acting President of Latvia; 1991–1993	Succeeded by Guntis Ulmanis
Preceded by Pauls Kalniņš	Speaker of the Saeima; 1993–1995	Succeeded by Ilga Kreituse
