= Democratic Center Party of Latvia =

Latvian political party

The Democratic Center Party (Latvian: Demokrātiskā centra partija) was a small centre political party in Latvia which was founded in September 1992. It took part in the 1993 parliamentary elections, obtaining 5 from 100 seats in the parliament, and in the 1994 local elections, obtaining seats in Riga, Jelgava and Jurmala. Leaders: Ints Cālītis, Aivars Kreituss, Juris Celmiņš, Māris Pūķis. Renamed into Latvian Democratic Party (Latvian: Latvijas Demokrātiskā partija) in August 1993, merged with "Saimnieks" to form Democratic Party "Saimnieks" in April 1995.
