= Popular Front of Latvia =

Latvian political party

Popular Front of Latvia Latvijas Tautas fronte
- Leader: Dainis Īvāns
- Founded: 9 October 1988
- Dissolved: 9 October 1999
- Merged into: Christian Democratic Union
- Headquarters: Riga
- Newspaper: Atmoda
- Ideology: Anti-communism; Latvian nationalism
- Political position: Big tent
- Supreme Council of Latvia (1990): 131 / 201

The Popular Front of Latvia (Latvian: Latvijas Tautas fronte) was a political organisation in Latvia in the late 1980s and early 1990s which led Latvia to its independence from the Soviet Union. It was similar to the Popular Front of Estonia and the Sąjūdis movement in Lithuania.

Its newspaper was Atmoda ("Awakening", cf. Latvian National Awakening), printed in the Latvian and Russian languages during 1989-1992.

== Historic background ==
Latvia, Estonia and Lithuania were occupied by the Soviet Union in 1940–1941, by Nazi Germany in 1941–1944 and again by the Soviet Union in 1944–1991.

In 1940, almost immediately an armed resistance started, which under the name of Forest Brothers continued until 1956. A chance to regain independence came in 1980s when Soviet general secretary Mikhail Gorbachev attempted to reform the Soviet Union. In particular, Gorbachev's glasnost policy allowed more freedom of speech in the Soviet Union than ever before.

Beginning in 1986, Latvians began to organise around specific causes. One of the first successes in challenging Moscow was the stoppage of the building of the 4th hydroelectric dam near Daugavpils on the Daugava, the main river in Latvia. This protest inspired the formation of the Environmental Protection Club, which saw the environmentally driven protests as a channel through which to challenge the Soviet regime more broadly.

Latvia's independence movement started with small demonstrations for independence and human rights in 1986. The first demonstrations, organised by Helsinki-86, were, however, suppressed by the government of Latvian SSR. The breaking point came in summer 1988. Many prominent Latvians publicly announced their support for increased autonomy for Latvia. Latvian newspapers started writing about aspects of Latvian history which had been banned during the Soviet period (for example, how Latvia had been occupied in 1940). The flag of Latvia which had been banned during the Soviet period was brought back. To summarise, a strong resurgence of Latvian national identity had started.

== Popular Front from 1988 to 1990 ==
This resurgence created several political organisations devoted to increased autonomy or independence for Latvia. The LTF was the biggest organisation. It was founded on 9 October 1988. Originally, Tautas Fronte took a moderate position, requesting wide autonomy for Latvia but stopping short of calling for independence. Tautas Fronte was supported by moderate members of the leadership of the Latvian SSR including head of state Anatolijs Gorbunovs, but opposed by hardline Communists.

Tautas Fronte quickly grew to 250,000 members. Its goal was to create a wide coalition devoted to autonomy or independence of Latvia. As 48% of Latvia's population was ethnically non-Latvian (mostly people who had moved to Latvia from other parts of the Soviet Union), Tautas Fronte reached out to ethnic minorities. In particular, it advocated school education in languages other than Latvian and Russian to attract the support of non-Russian minorities. At the same time, Tautas Fronte worked with more radical Latvian movements advocating the immediate independence of Latvia.

Gradually, the overall opinion within Tautas Fronte shifted from the autonomy of Latvia within the Soviet Union to full independence. On 31 May 1989, it announced that the government of the Soviet Union had not been sympathetic enough to Latvia gaining autonomy and an independent Latvia had become the only option.

In 1989 and 1990, the first free elections were held in Latvia since Kārlis Ulmanis' coup d'état in 1934. The most important were the elections to the Supreme Soviet, the parliament of the Latvian SSR, on 18 March 1990. A pro-independence coalition, led by Tautas Fronte, won 138 out of 201 seats in the Supreme Soviet, more than the 2/3 majority needed to amend the Constitution.

== Tautas fronte from 1990 to 1993 ==
After the 1990 elections, Tautas fronte became the governing party in Latvia. On 4 May 1990, the first law passed by the new Supreme Soviet declared Latvia's intention to restore independence. Dainis Īvāns, the chairman of Tautas fronte, became the deputy speaker of parliament and his deputy, Ivars Godmanis, became the prime minister. Many other members of Tautas fronte took key positions in the government of Latvia.

From May 1990 to August 1991, Latvia went through a tense period. Its independence was not recognised by the government of the Soviet Union and a military crackdown threatened by the Soviet government was generally feared.

Several Soviet tanks appeared on the bank of the Daugava river in the Riga Old Town. Television networks broadcast footage of rifle shots being exchanged at night in Old Town on the evening of 13 January 1991. On the streets unarmed people built the Barricades and spent days and nights guarding them, singing Latvian songs. Because of this the independence movement is now known as "the Singing Revolution".

The independence of Latvia was finally recognised after the failure of the Soviet putsch in August 1991. The main political goal of Tautas fronte was thus achieved. It now faced a more difficult task: reforming the socialist economy of Latvia into a free-market system. The economic transition was very difficult, with the GDP of Latvia halving from 1990 to 1993. With the economy in severe decline, the popularity of the Godmanis cabinet declined. Many politicians left Tautas fronte and formed new political parties to avoid being associated with the unpopular government.

== The end of Tautas fronte ==
In June 1993, Latvia held the first elections of the parliament since the restoration of independence. Weakened by economic difficulties and defections of many politicians, the Godmanis-led Tautas fronte received just 2.62% of the popular vote and gained no seats in the new parliament. It attempted to reinvent itself as a Christian democratic party and changed its name to Kristīgā Tautas partija (Christian People's Party) but without much success. Eventually, it merged with another party, Kristīgi demokrātiskā savienība (Christian Democratic Union). The People's Front finally dissolved itself on 9 October 1999 during its 9th congress.

== Legacy ==
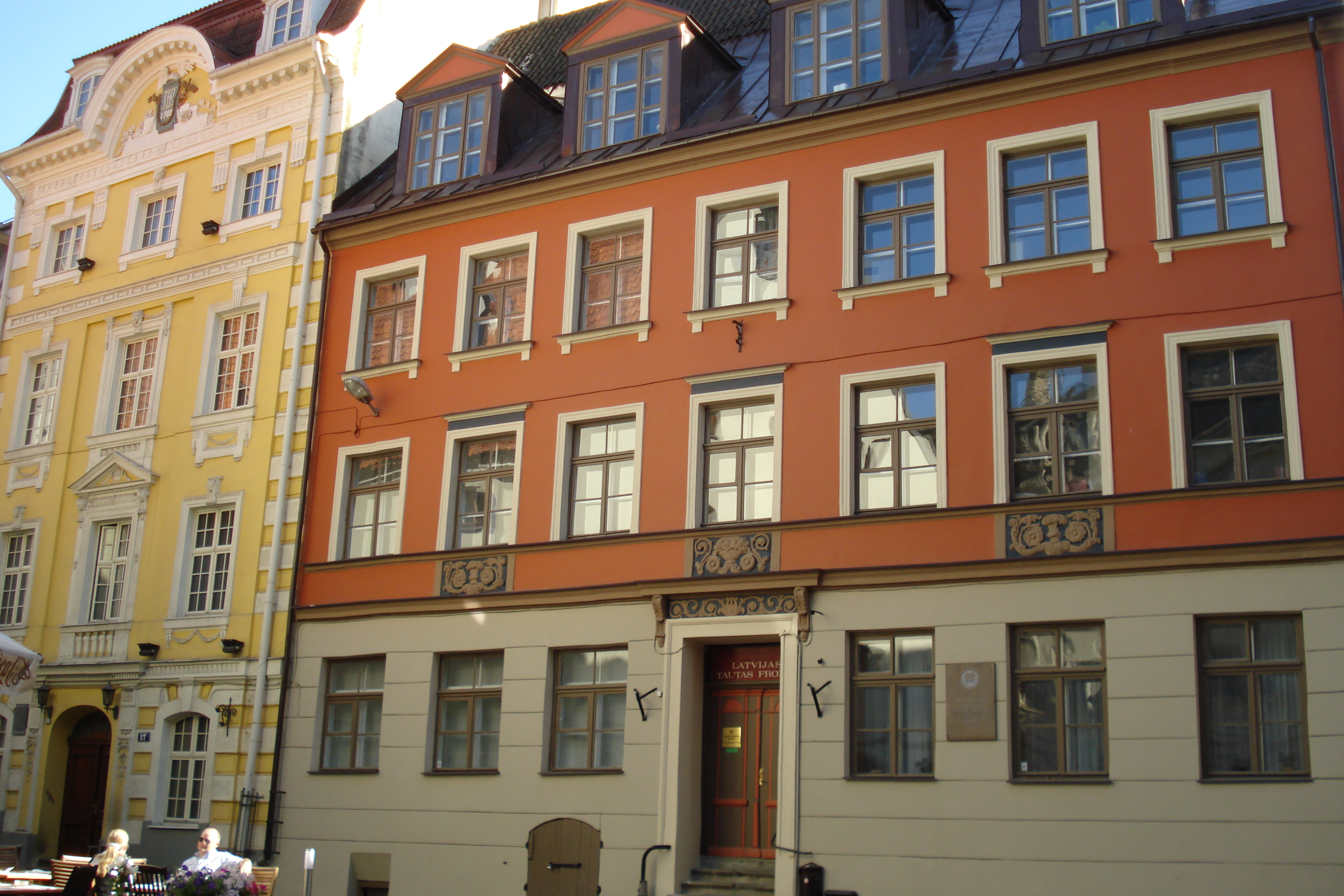
Museum of the Popular Front in Riga

All or almost all the political goals of Tautas fronte have been achieved. Latvia is now an independent country, with Latvian as the only official language. Its economy and politics, formerly socialist and oriented towards the Soviet Union, is now free-market and European-oriented. While Tautas fronte itself ceased to exist during the economic difficulties of the mid-1990s, many of its former activists have important roles in today's Latvia.

The Museum of the Popular Front of Latvia is located in its former offices, which are owned by the state, in Vecpilsētas iela 13/15 in Riga. It is part of the Latvian Museum of National History.

== Election results ==
=== Supreme Council ===
Election year	Leader	Votes	% (place)	Seats	+/–	Status
1990	Dainis Īvāns	1,086,439	68.20 (#1)	131 / 201	New	Government

=== Saeima ===
Election year	Leader	Votes	% (place)	Seats	Status
1993	Uldis Augstkalns	29,396	2.63 (#9)	0 / 100	Extra-parliamentary
1995	Uldis Augstkalns	11,090	1.17 (#14)	0 / 100	Extra-parliamentary

== See also ==
- BPF Party
- Democratic Russia
- Latvian independence movement
- People's Movement of Ukraine
- Popular Front of Estonia
- Popular Front of Moldova
- Sąjūdis
