= Latvian National Independence Movement =

Latvian National Independence Movement Latvijas Nacionālās Neatkarības Kustība
- Leader: Eduards Berklavs
- Founded: July 1988
- Dissolved: 1997
- Merged into: TB/LNMK
- Ideology: National conservatism
- Political position: Right-wing

The Latvian National Independence Movement (Latvian: Latvijas Nacionālās Neatkarības Kustība, LNNK) was a political organization in Latvia from 1988 until 1997.

== History ==
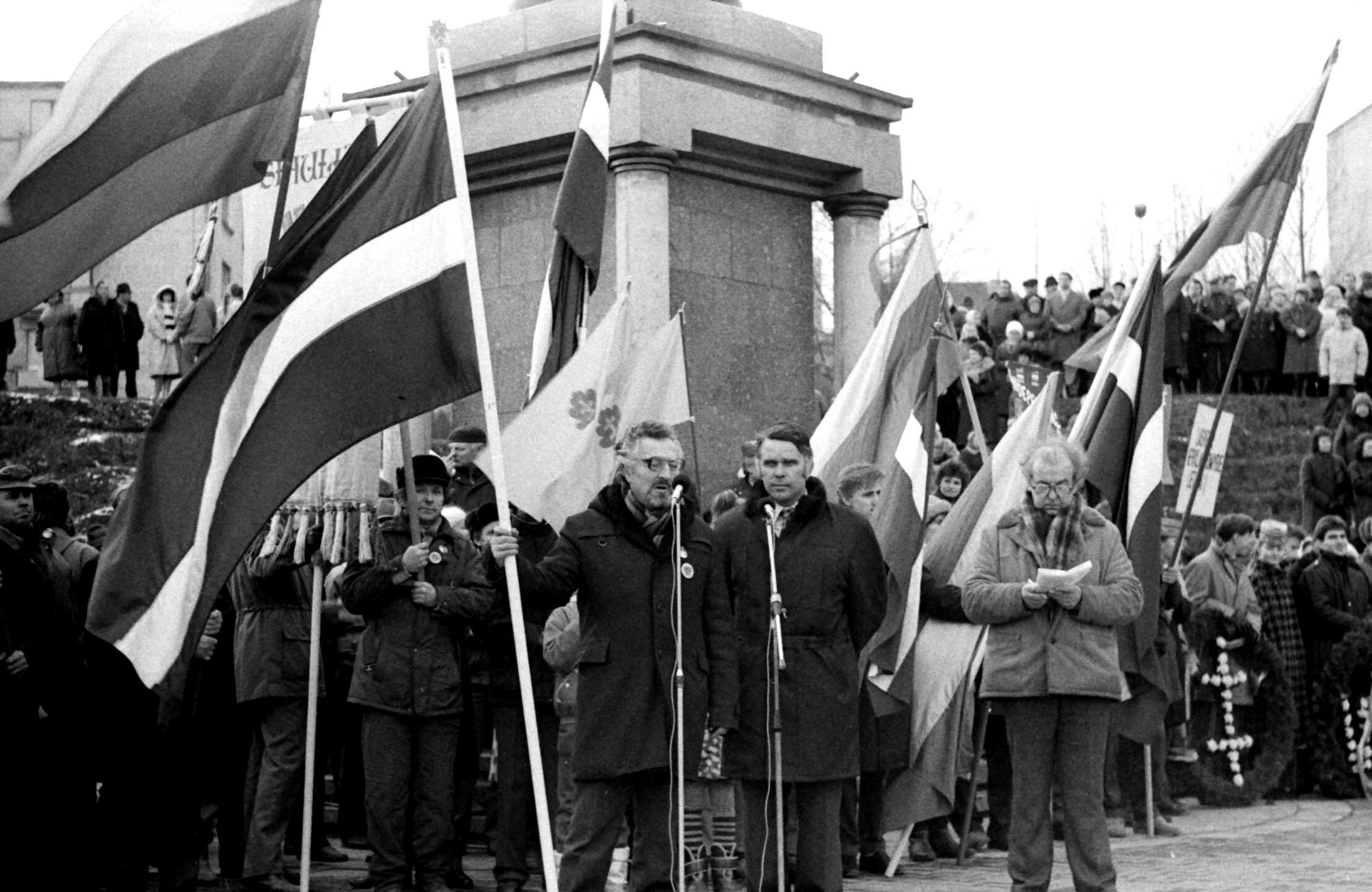
Day of Lithuanian independence in Šiauliai, Lithuania. The event is attended by the Latvian political party For Fatherland and Freedom/LNNK

It was formed in 1988 as the radical wing of Latvian nationalist movement. Unlike the mainstream Latvian Popular Front, which had supported more autonomy for Latvia within the Soviet Union, LNNK insisted on independence from its beginning. The leaders of LNNK included Eduards Berklavs, Aleksandrs Kiršteins, Andrejs Krastiņš, Einars Repše and Juris Dobelis.

After Latvia regained independence, LNNK became a political party and renamed itself the National Conservative Party. It won 15 seats out of 100 in the 1993 parliamentary election and was an influential opposition party. In 1993 its candidate for Prime Minister was Joachim Siegerist, who lost by only one vote and ended up second.

LNNK won the municipal election in the Latvian capital, Riga in 1994 but its popularity quickly faded after that. It lost half of its seats in the parliament in the 1995 parliamentary election, securing only eight spots.

In 1997, the LNNK merged with another right-wing national-conservative party, Tēvzemei un Brīvībai (For Fatherland and Freedom), forming the joint party For Fatherland and Freedom/LNNK (TB/LNNK). After entering into an alliance with For Fatherland and Freedom, the party increasingly sought to propagate a particularly 'Latvian' vision for Latvia as highlighted by a series of controversial adverts encouraging the consumption of Latvian goods, and warning of the dangers of non-Latvians.

An organization with similar aims and almost identical name, the Estonian National Independence Party existed in Estonia.

== See also ==
- Conservatism
- Nationalism
- Politics of Latvia
