= Latvian independence movement =

The modern Latvian independence movement was the resistance movement to foreign occupation of the Republic of Latvia during Soviet and Nazi German occupation (1940–1991).

== First year (1940–1941) of occupation ==
The effects of the Molotov–Ribbentrop Pact of August 23, 1939 assigned Latvia to the Soviet sphere of influence. On August 5, 1940, the Soviet Union forcibly annexed Latvia. On June 14, 1941, 15,000 Latvian citizens were forcibly deported to Gulag camps and a large number of army officers shot. The occupation and forced annexation into the USSR was not recognised in at least de jure by many countries, such as the United States, the United Kingdom, Ireland, Canada, France, West Germany, Mexico etc. until the restoration of independence.

== Nazi German occupation (1940–1944/1945) ==
Shortly after the start of the German–Soviet War in 1941, the territory of Latvia was occupied and governed as a part of Reichskommissariat Ostland along Lithuania and Estonia. Tens of thousands of Latvian Jews were killed in the Holocaust, along with other local opponents of the regime. Among the underground resistance movement, the Latvian Central Council led the efforts of the resistance movement which strived to restore an independent and democratic Republic of Latvia.

== Anti-Soviet guerrilla warfare (1945–1960) ==
After World War II thousands of resistance fighters (including former members of the pre-World War II Aizsargi and 19th Latvian Waffen SS division) participated in unsuccessful guerrilla warfare against the Soviet regime after the reoccupation of Latvia in 1944–1945. Most of the armed resistance was suppressed by 1952.

== The Latvian Third Awakening (1986–1991) ==
"Perestroika" enabled Latvians to pursue a bolder nationalistic program, particularly through such general issues as environmental protection.

On June 14, 1987, the group Helsinki-86 organised a ceremony of placing flowers at the Freedom Monument in Riga. This event demonstrated the rebirth of national courage and self-confidence in Latvia.

On July 28, 1989, the Supreme Soviet of the Latvian SSR adopted a "Declaration of Sovereignty" and amended the Constitution to assert the supremacy of its laws over those of the U.S.S.R. Pro-independence Latvian Popular Front candidates gained a two-thirds majority in the Supreme Council in the March 18, 1990 democratic elections. On May 4, the Council declared its intention to restore full Latvian independence after a "transitional" period; 3 days later, Ivars Godmanis was chosen Council of Ministers Chairman, or Prime Minister.

In January 1991, Soviet political and military forces tried unsuccessfully to overthrow the legitimate Latvian authorities by occupying the central publishing house in Riga and establishing a "Committee of National Salvation" to usurp governmental functions. On January 20, 1991, Riga OMON attacked Latvia's Interior Ministry, killing six people. – see January 1991 events in Latvia. Seven OMON members were subsequently found guilty by the Riga District Court and received suspended sentences.

Seventy-three percent of all Latvian residents confirmed their strong support for independence March 3 in an advisory referendum. A large number of ethnic Russians also voted for the proposition.

Latvia claimed de facto independence on August 21, 1991, in the aftermath of the failed Soviet coup attempt. International recognition of renewed independence, including the U.S.S.R. (on September 6), followed. The United States, which had never recognized Latvia's forcible annexation by the U.S.S.R., resumed full diplomatic relations with Latvia on September 5 and recognized Latvian independence on September 6.
