= Democratic Party "Saimnieks" =

Latvian political party

- Founded: April 29, 1995
- Dissolved: March 2005
- Merger of: Democratic Center Party; Saimnieks
- Ideology: Social democracy
- Political position: Centre-left

The Democratic Party "Saimnieks" (Latvian: Demokrātiskā partija "Saimnieks") was a Latvian centre-left political party formed through the merger of the Latvian Democratic Party and the political party "Saimnieks" in 1995. It won the 1995 parliamentary election and was represented by 18 deputies in the 6th Saeima. It participated in Andris Šķēle's first and second cabinet, withdrawing from the coalition in 1998.

The party lost the 1998 parliamentary election, failing to win any seats. It was eventually disbanded in March 2005.

== Bibliography ==
- Mednis I. Partiju laiki Latvijā (1988–2002). — R.: Drukātava, 2007. ISBN 978-9984-798-20-2, 262.—270. lpp.
