= Linards (given name) =

Male given name

- Gender: Male
- Name day: 6 November

Origin
- Region of origin: Latvia

Linards is a Latvian masculine given name that is a variant of the Germanic name Lennart. Individuals with the name Linards linclude:

- Linards Grantiņš (born 1950), Latvian human rights activist
- Linards Jaunzems (born 1995), Latvian basketball player
- Linards Reiziņš (1924–1991), Latvian mathematician
- Linards Tauns (1922–1963), Latvian writer
