= Eestlane olen ja eestlaseks jään =

1980s Estonian patriotic song

Song by Ivo Linna and In spe
- Language: Estonian
- English title: Estonian I am and Estonian I'll remain
- Genre: rock
- Lyricist: Alo Mattiisen

Eestlane olen ja eestlaseks jään (Estonian: "Estonian I am and Estonian I'll remain") is a protest song from the Estonian Singing Revolution performed by Ivo Linna and the group In Spe with lyrics by Alo Mattiisen.

Written despite the official attitude of the Soviet Union that all its citizens were Soviets, rather than the individual nationalities, the lyric makes the singer's contrary position very clear. Loosely translated from Estonian into English, Linna sings "Estonian I am and Estonian I'll remain/when I was created as an Estonian/Being Estonian is proud and free like a crow/Yes, just like that, freely like our forefathers".

The song is often performed at the Estonian Laulupidu and other patriotic events, as well as being regarded as one of Estonia's favourite songs.

== Lyrics ==
Estonian original

Tuhat korda kas või alata
tuhat aastat tõusu mitte luigelend
oma rahvust maha salata
sama ränk on nagu orjaks müüa end.

Eestlane olen ja eestlaseks jään,
kui mind eestlaseks loodi.
Eestlane olla on uhke ja hää
vabalt vaarisa moodi.

Tuhat kõuehäälset küsijat
Vaba meri. Põlistalud. Püha muld.
Tuhat korda tuhat püsijat
kõige kiuste elus hoiab püha tuld.

Eestlane olen ja eestlaseks jään,
kui mind eestlaseks loodi.
Eestlane olla on uhke ja hää
vabalt vaarisa moodi.

Mm... jah, just nõnda vabalt vaarisa moodi.
Nende mehiste meeste moodi.

Eestlane olen ja eestlaseks jään,
kui mind eestlaseks loodi.
Eestlane olla on uhke ja hää
vabalt vaarisa moodi.

Jah, just nõnda vabalt vaarisa moodi.
Nende mehiste meeste moodi.

English translation

A thousand times, even without land
a thousand years of ascension, not swan flight
hiding your nationality
is as bad as selling yourself as a slave.

Estonian I am and Estonian I'll remain,
since I was created Estonian.
Being Estonian is glorious and beautiful
free like our forefathers.

A thousand loud questioners
Free sea. Native farms. Holy soil.
A thousand times, a thousand stalwarts
keep the sacred fire alive despite everything.

Estonian I am and Estonian I'll remain,
since I was created Estonian.
Being Estonian is glorious and beautiful
free like our forefathers.

Mm... Yes, free just like our forefathers.
Like those manly men.

Estonian I am and Estonian I'll remain,
since I was created Estonian.
Being Estonian is glorious and beautiful
free like our forefathers.

Yes, free just like our forefathers.
Like those manly men.
