= Helsinki-86 =

Former Latvian human rights NGO and political party

The CTAG (Latvian: Cilvēktiesību aizstāvības grupa, Human Rights Defense Group) Helsinki-86 was founded on 10 July 1986 in the Latvian port town of Liepāja by three workers: Linards Grantiņš, Raimonds Bitenieks, and Mārtiņš Bariss. Its name refers to the Helsinki Accords and the year of its founding.

Helsinki-86 was the first openly anti-Communist organization, but also the first openly organized opposition to the Soviet regime, in the former Soviet Union, setting an example for other ethnic minorities' pro-independence movements.

== Role in the "Singing Revolution" ==
Helsinki-86 was an important early actor during the "Singing Revolution" in Latvia, during which the country regained its independence from the USSR.

By the beginning of 1988, there were nearly twenty members of Helsinki-86. The most prominent among them, aside from the founding members were Rolands Silaraups, Konstantins Pupurs, Juris Vidiņš, Juris Ziemelis, Alfreds Zariņš, Heino Lāma, and Edmunds Cirvelis. By mid-1988, some of the most active members had been expelled from the USSR by the Soviet authorities.

On June 14, 1987, the group organised the first peaceful anti-Communist demonstration with a customary placing of flowers at the base of the Freedom Monument (Latvian: Brīvības piemineklis) in the Latvian capital, Riga. This event marked a turning point the rebirth of national courage and self-confidence in Latvia.

On August 23, 1987, the group organized a protest demonstration against the Molotov–Ribbentrop Pact, which among numerous other historical events resulted in the Soviet occupation of Latvia in 1940, during the administration of Latvian President and Prime Minister Kārlis Ulmanis. Historically, on November 18, 1987, Latvian Independence Day was celebrated for the first time since 1940.

On March 25, 1988 the group called for the Latvian people to gather by the Freedom Monument in Riga to commemorate the victims of Soviet terror. On that particular day, it became evident that the pro-independence leadership began a gradual transition of influence from Helsinki-86 to moderate Latvian Communists and nationally prominent figures, who openly invited Latvian citizens for the first time to come en masse to a different Riga location: the Cemetery of Fallen Soldiers.

On June 14, 1988, for the first time since the Soviet occupation, the group openly carried the Latvian national flag through the streets of Riga.

== Since independence ==
A political party based on the Helsinki-86 organization was officially registered in 1998. It was unsuccessful in the elections for Latvia's Saeima (parliament) later that year, as well as in the 2001 municipal elections.

== See also ==
- Latvian National Independence Movement
- Popular Front of Latvia
