= Linards Grantiņš =

Latvian former human rights activist (born 1950)

Linards Grantiņš (born 1950) is a Latvian former human rights activist who was among the founders of the Latvian human rights activist group Helsinki-86 in 1986.

He later established the hate site Tautastribunals.eu (Latvian for "People's Tribunal.eu") in 2006, which regularly accuses and issues "verdicts" of capital punishment to self-identified "traitors of the Latvian state". He was arrested in 2015 for inciting national, ethnic and racial hatred.

== Biography ==
Grantiņš was born in Siberia, where his family was deported to by the Soviet regime in 1949. Grantiņš returned to Soviet-occupied Latvia in 1956.

In 1986, while working as an amber craftsman in Liepāja, he co-founded Helsinki-86 and helped to organize the first commemoration of the victims of the June 1941 Soviet deportations since the Second World War at Riga's Freedom Monument in 1987, filming the events and sending the tape outside the USSR. He was then arrested by Soviet authorities and later allowed to go into exile to West Germany in 1987. From there, he supported other activists of the Third Latvian National Awakening by supplying them with audio, and video recording equipment scarcely available in the USSR.

After the restoration of the independence of Latvia, he returned from abroad, although he later moved back. In 1996, Grantiņš was awarded the Order of the Three Stars.

In 2013, MP Valērijs Agešins asked to initiate criminal proceedings against Grantiņš for making veiled threats against him on his website, but the request was refused.
