= Estonian Sovereignty Declaration =

1988 proclamation of Soviet Estonian sovereignty during the Singing Revolution

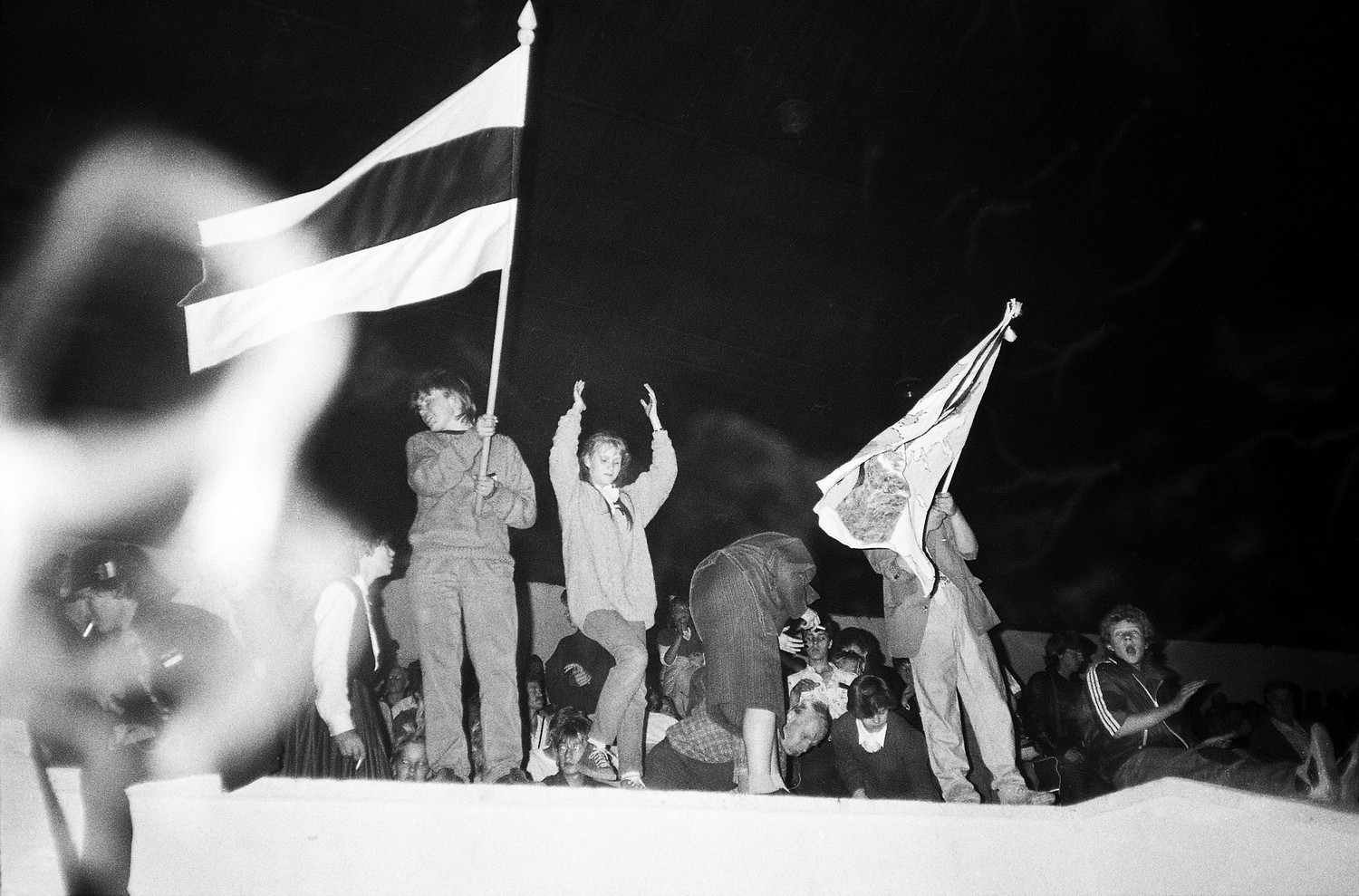
The Singing Revolution in 1988.

The Estonian Sovereignty Declaration (Estonian: suveräänsusdeklaratsioon), fully: Declaration on the Sovereignty of the Estonian SSR (Deklaratsioon Eesti NSV suveräänsusest), was issued on 16 November 1988 during the Singing Revolution in the Estonian SSR. The declaration asserted Estonia's sovereignty and the supremacy of the Estonian laws over the laws of the Soviet Union. Estonia's newly elected parliament also laid claim to all natural resources (land, inland waters, forests, and mineral deposits) and to the means of industrial production, agriculture, construction, state banks, transportation, municipal services, etc. within Estonia's borders.

== Background ==
Estonia gained independence in 1918, in the aftermath of World War I. During World War II, on 16-17 June 1940, Estonia was invaded and occupied by the Soviet army, and its territory was subsequently annexed by Stalin's USSR in August 1940.

The majority of Western nations refused to recognize the incorporation of Estonia de jure by the Soviet Union and only recognized the government of the Estonian SSR de facto or not at all. Such countries recognized Estonian, Latvian and Lithuanian diplomats and consuls who still functioned in the name of their former governments. These diplomats persisted in this anomalous situation until the ultimate restoration of Baltic independence.

In the 1980s, new policies of perestroika and glasnost were introduced and political repression in the Soviet Union came to an end. As a result, during the 1991 Soviet coup d'état attempt on 20 August 1991, Estonia restored full independence, almost three years after the Estonian Sovereignty Declaration was made. On 6 September 1991, the Soviet Union recognized the independence of Estonia, and the country became a member of the United Nations on 17 September 1991. After more than three years of negotiations, on 31 August 1994, the last remaining armed forces of Russia withdrew from Estonia.

== The Declaration ==
DECLARATION OF THE SUPREME SOVIET OF THE ESTONIAN SOVIET SOCIALIST REPUBLIC

On the Sovereignty of the Estonian SSR

The people of Estonia have tilled their land and developed their culture on the shores of the Baltic Sea for more than 5000 years. In 1940, the ethnically homogenous, sovereign Republic of Estonia became a part of the Soviet Union, while the preservation of sovereignty guarantees and national prospering were foreseen. The internal politics of the eras of Stalinism and stagnation ignored those guarantees and positions. As a result, a demographic situation had evolved in Estonia that was unfavourable to Estonians as the indigenous ethnic group, the natural environment in many regions of the republic is catastrophic, the destabilization of the economy is having a negative effect on the living standard of the entire population of the republic.

To overcome the difficult situation, the Supreme Soviet of the Estonian SSR sees but one specific way out – the further development of Estonia must take place under conditions of sovereignty. The sovereignty of the Estonian SSR means that it wields the supreme power in its territory through the supreme institutions of power, governance and courts. The sovereignty of the Estonian SSR is whole and indivisible. According to this, the future status of the republic within the Soviet Union should be determined by a union treaty.

The Supreme Soviet of the Estonian SSR does not agree with those amendments and additions to the Constitution of the Soviet Union proposed by the Presidium of the Supreme Soviet of the Soviet Union that exclude the constitutional right of the Estonian SSR to self-determination. Relying on the international covenants on Economic, Social and Cultural Rights and on Civil and Political Rights of 16 September 1966, which have been ratified by the Soviet Union, and on other norms of international law, the supreme institution representing the power of the people of the Estonian SSR, the Supreme Soviet of the Estonian SSR, declares the supremacy of its laws on the territory of the Estonian SSR.

Amendments and additions to the Constitution of the Soviet Union shall henceforth enter into force on the territory of the Estonian SSR when approved by the Supreme Soviet of the Estonian SSR and when the Constitution of the Estonian SSR is amended.

The Supreme Soviet of the Estonian SSR appeals to those who have linked their fate with the territory of Estonia to consolidate for building a democratic and socialist society of Estonia. The legal and factual implementation of sovereignty also means that the people of Estonia will not in the future agree with any law that would discriminate against the representatives of any other ethnic group living in the Estonian SSR.

Chairman of the Presidium of the Supreme Soviet of the Estonian SSR A. Rüütel
Secretary of the Presidium of the Supreme Soviet of the Estonian SSR V. Vaht

Tallinn, 16 November 1988

== See also ==
- On the Restoration of Independence of the Republic of Latvia
- Act of the Re-Establishment of the State of Lithuania
- State continuity of the Baltic states
- Dissolution of the Soviet Union
