= Konstantins Pupurs =

Latvian politician

Konstantīns Pupurs (March 5, 1964 in Riga, – September 10, 2017 in Riga) was a Latvian political scientist, historian, linguist and human rights group "Helsinki-86" activist during the Latvian Third Awakening, also known as the Singing Revolution. Since 2010 he has been active in the political party "All for Latvia!".

== Biography ==
Pupurs was born in Riga in 1964 and graduated from the Riga Secondary School No. 66 in 1981. The same year he studied at the Biryuzov Military Political School until 1982, after which he was drafted into the regular Soviet Army until 1983. Right after his service he began his studies at the Moscow Institute for History and Archives, but was expelled for "anti-Soviet agitation and propaganda" in 1986. That autumn he enrolled in the Faculty of History and Philosophy at the State University of Latvia.

From 1987 Konstantīns Pupurs was involved in the Environment Protection Club. On June 14, 1987, together with Helsinki-86 members he attended the first anti-Soviet demonstration in Riga at the Freedom Monument since the Second World War, commemorating victims of the June deportation from the occupied Baltic states in 1941. At the end of the year he officially joined Helsinki-86, which was announced on Radio Free Europe and Voice of America. From 1988 he represented the interests of the group at the Council of Public Organizations, which at that time served as an informal "parliament" of all unofficial and official organizations in Latvia. On June 14, 1988, Pupurs carried the then-banned flag of Latvia through the city center - the first public display of the flag since the 1940s. After the event, Pupurs was expelled from university. He and his mother Astrīda were stripped of Soviet citizenship and ordered under duress to leave the USSR by the KGB in July 1988 for his participation in Helsinki-86.

From 1988 to 1990 Pupurs lived in West Germany, actively participating in the Latvian exile political movement and cultural life. Later, in 1990, he moved to the United States. After the restoration of the independence of Latvia, Pupurs moved back to Latvia in 1992, where he continued his education at the University of Latvia and actively participated in Latvian political life. In 1994, after an alleged assassination attempt, he moved back to US. While in the United States, he worked various odd jobs until 1995 (e.g. as a housemaker, a representative of the Massachusetts state government and a Merchant Marine seaman), eventually gaining U.S. citizenship and joining the U.S. Navy in 2004 as an NCO. While there, he obtained the rank of Second Lieutenant in the U.S. Army. From 2007 to 2008 he served in New Hampshire, Texas and Arizona, and from 2008 to February 2010 he was posted to Iraq and Germany with the Medical Service Corps (U.S. Army), receiving a number of decorations.

He graduated from Massachusetts State University in Boston in 1999, and in 2003 obtained his master's degree from the London School of Economics in Russian and Post-Soviet studies.

After his military service, he returned to Latvia in 2010, where he served in the Riga Municipal Police, later joining the Latvian Maritime Academy as a lecturer and translator. In 2010, he joined the political party "All for Latvia!".

Pupurs was married twice. During his second marriage, his son Ivars Pupurs was born in 2008. Konstantīns Pupurs died on September 10, 2017.
