= In Spe =

Estonian rock band

- Origin: Estonia
- Genres: Symphonic rock; progressive rock
- Years active: 1979–1985
- Past members: Alo Mattiisen; Anne Tüür; Arvo Urb; Erkki-Sven Tüür; Ivo Varts; Jaanus Nõgisto; Jüri Tamm; Mart Metsala; Peeter Brambat; Priit Kuulberg; Riho Sibul; Toivo Kopli

In Spe was an Estonian progressive rock band established in 1979 by Erkki-Sven Tüür.

== Members ==
- Alo Mattiisen
- Anne Tüür
- Arvo Urb
- Erkki-Sven Tüür
- Ivo Varts
- Jaanus Nõgisto
- Jüri Tamm
- Mart Metsala
- Peeter Brambat
- Priit Kuulberg
- Riho Sibul
- Toivo Kopli.

== Discography ==
=== Albums ===
- 1983 "In Spe"
- 1985 "In Spe"
