= Linards Reiziņš =

Latvian mathematician

Linards Reizins
- Born: January 14, 1924; Riga, Latvia
- Died: 1991 (aged 66–67); Latvia
- Citizenship: Latvian
- Education: University of Latvia
- Known for: Differential equations, History of mathematics
- Scientific career
- Fields: Mathematician

Linards Reiziņš (14 January 1924 – 1991) was a Latvian mathematician who specialized in the field of differential equations and the conditions under which two systems of differential equations are topologically equivalent.

== Life ==
Reiziņš was born on 14 January 1924 in Riga, Latvia where he attended the Second Gymnasium in Riga but World War II began before he could finish his studies. After World War II, Reiziņš began studying mathematics at the University of Latvia. After graduating in 1948 he specialized in the field of differential equations in the Department of Mathematical Analysis under the supervision of Arvids Lusis.

Following the Soviet invasion in 1944, Reiziņš lost his position at the university and worked as a school teacher until 1959. However, he continued to do research on differential equations. In 1951 his first paper was published in Latvia. Entitled The behaviour of the integral curves of a system of three differential equations in the neighbourhood of a singular point, an English translation was published by the American Mathematical Society an English translation in 1955. In 1958, Reiziņš became lecturer at the University of Latvia and got his full professorship in 1979.

Reiziņš published over 140 articles, of which 38 are connected with the history of mathematics. His work on the study of Piers Bohl's (1865–1921) heritage is of special relevance.

Among other results he found a formula giving the relationship between the solutions of full and truncated systems of differential equations. During his later years he became an authority in Pfaffian functions.

Reiziņš died in 1991.

== Bibliography ==
- A. Reinfelds, I. Henina, Professor Linards Reizins (1924–1991), a Latvian mathematician, Proceedings of the Latvian Academy of Sciences, Section B, 1994, no. 2 (559), pp. 49–52.
- "Linards Eduardovich Reizins biography". www-history.mcs.st-andrews.ac.uk/Biographies/Reizins.html.
- Linards Reiziņš at zbMATH
