= Singing Revolution =

Baltic independence movements (1987–1991)

- Part of the Revolutions of 1989 and the Dissolution of the Soviet Union
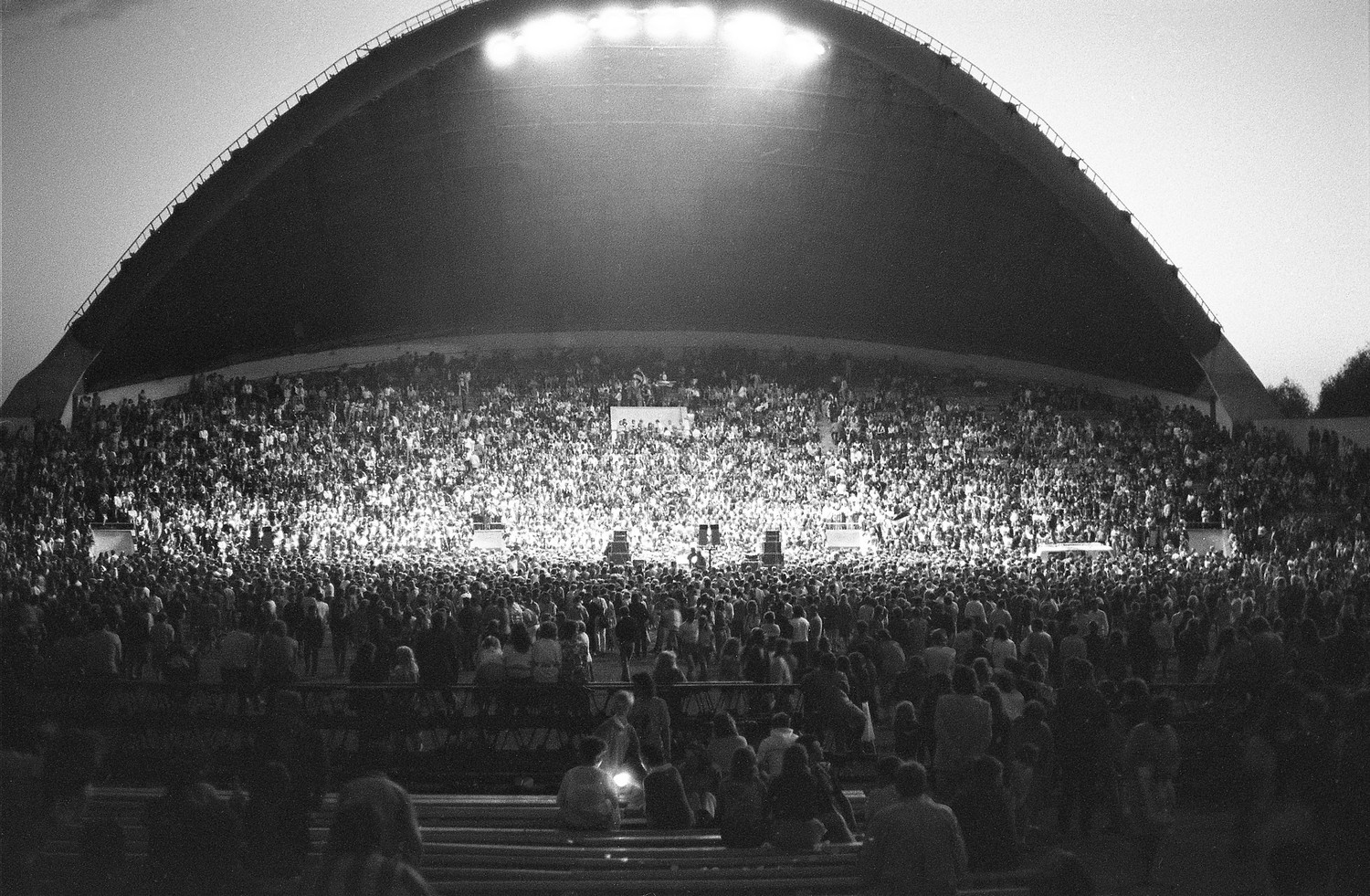
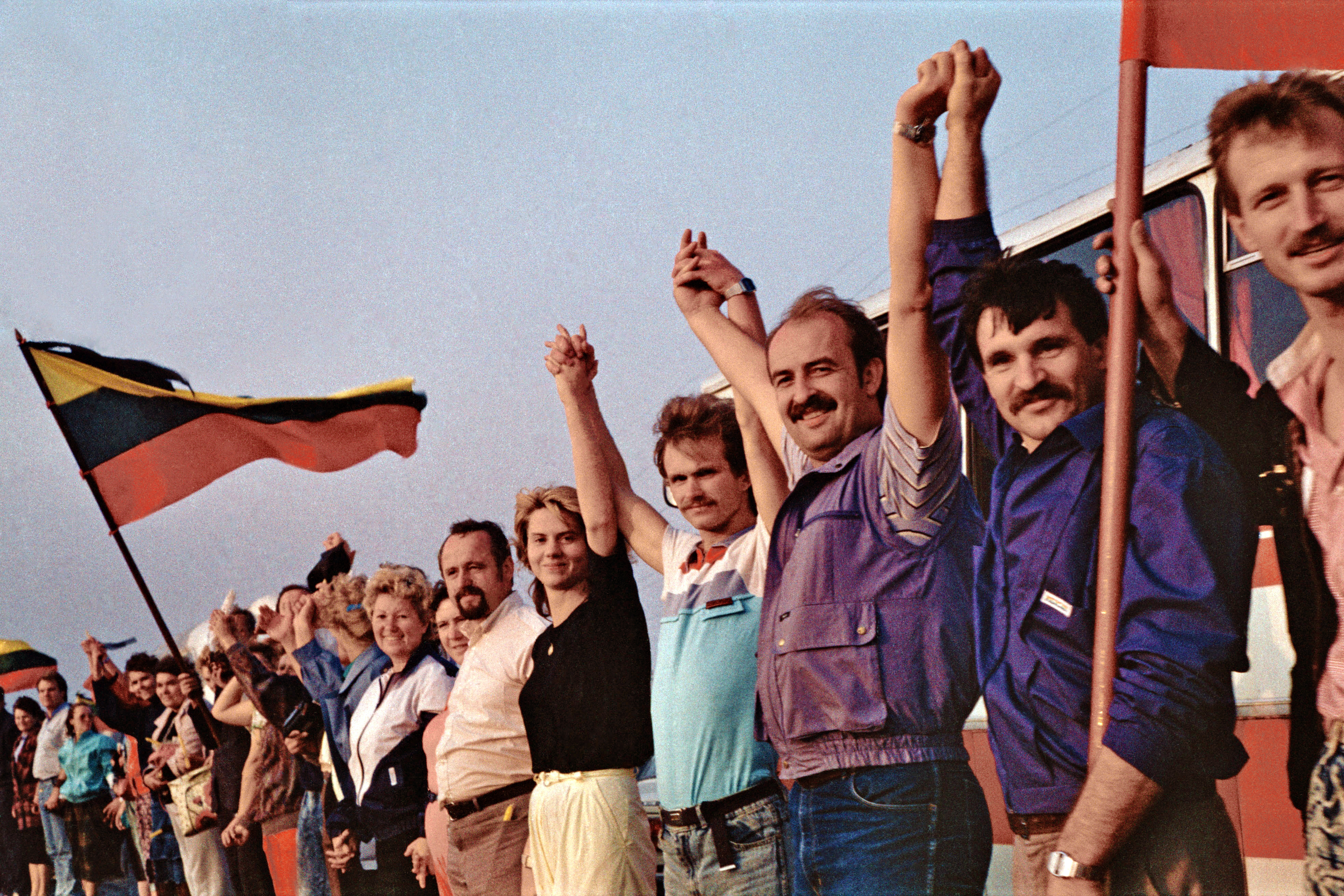
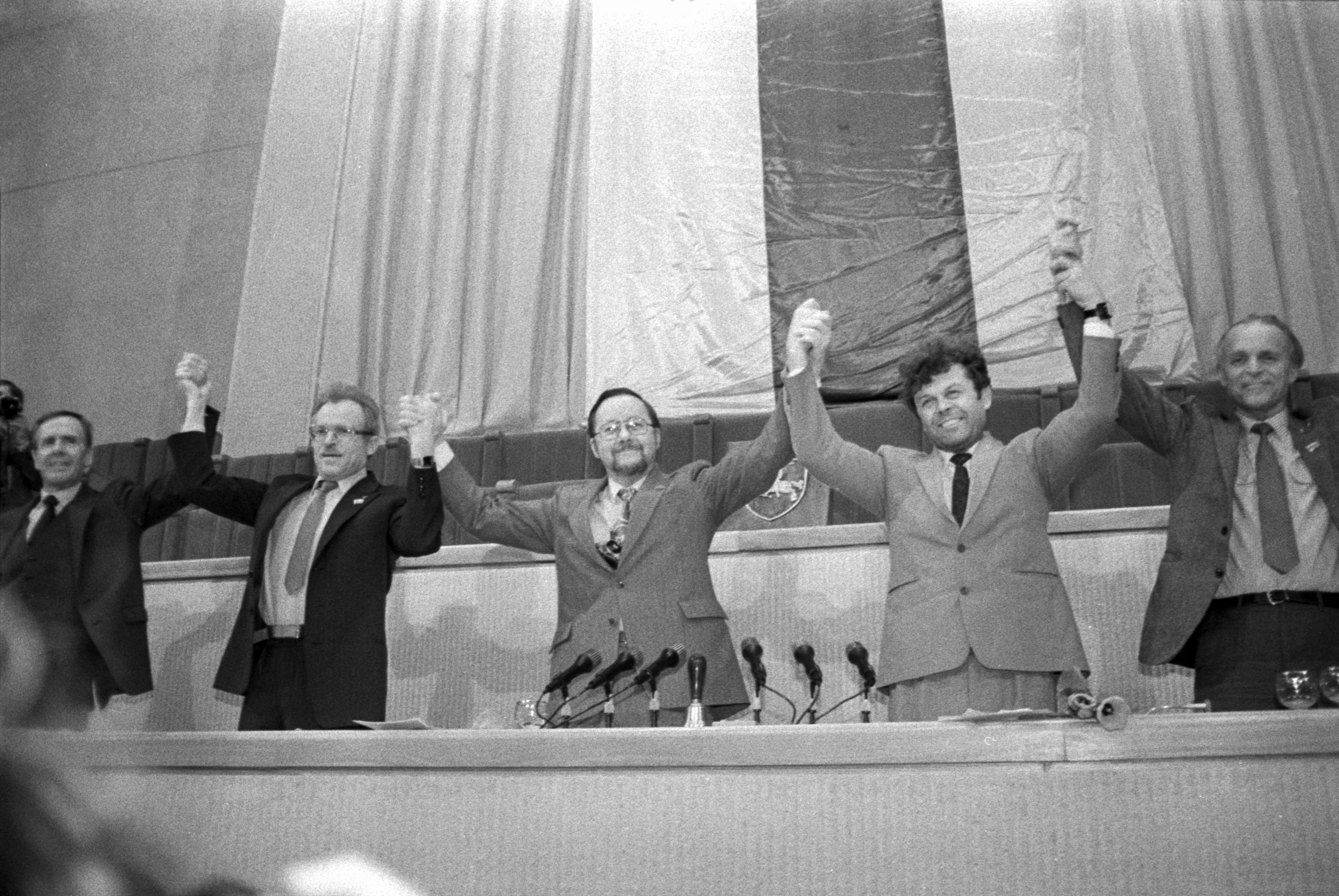
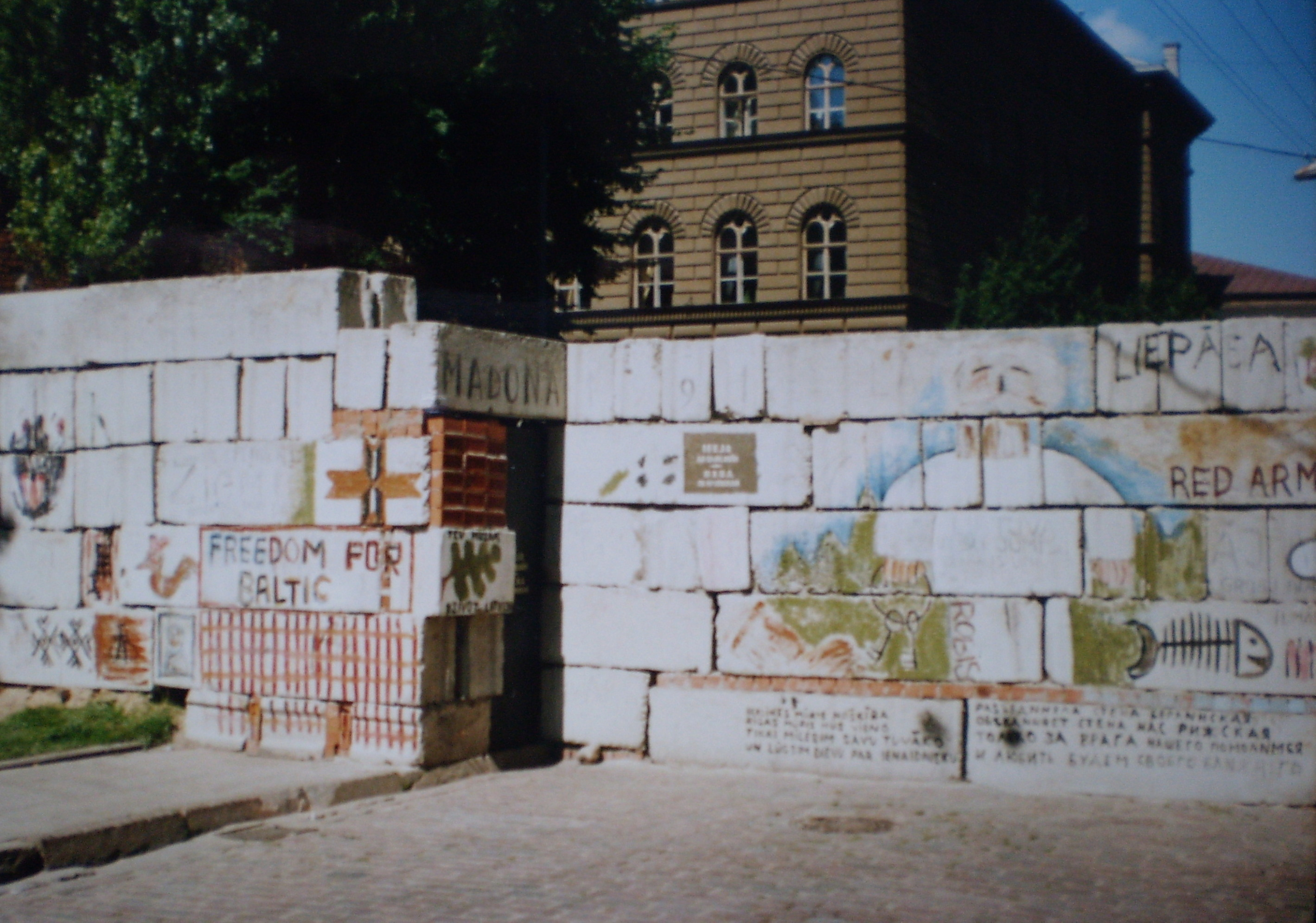
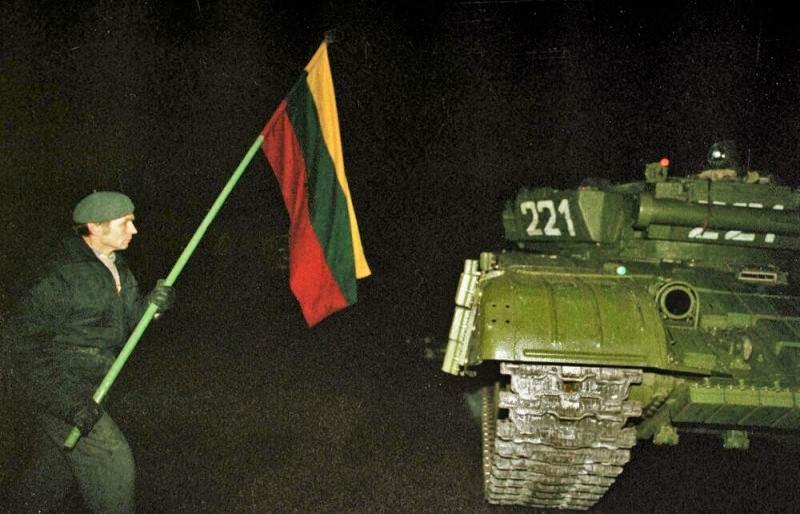
- Clockwise from the top left: the Song of Estonia Festival in 1988, the Baltic Way human chain in 1989, leaders of the Supreme Council of Lithuania after the promulgation of the Act of the Re-Establishment of the State of Lithuania in 1990, a Lithuanian civilian confronts a Soviet tank during the January Events in 1991, The Barricades in Riga in 1991
- Date: 14 June 1987 – 6 September 1991 (4 years, 2 months, 3 weeks and 2 days)
- Location: Estonia, Latvia, Lithuania (the three Baltic countries)
- Caused by: Soviet occupation of the Baltic states; Political repression; Economic stagnation; Nationalist discontent; Sovietization; Russification; Religious persecution
- Goals: Independence of the three Baltic countries; End of Communist rule; Democratization; Civil rights; Economic reform
- Methods: Protests; Demonstrations; Strikes; Civil disobedience; Human chain; Civil resistance; Barricades
- Result: Restoration of the independence of the Baltic states: Declarations of state sovereignty of Estonia (18 November 1988), Lithuania (18 May 1989), and Latvia (28 July 1989); Free elections in Lithuania (24 February 1990), Latvia (18 March 1990), and Estonia (18 March 1990); Declarations of independence of Lithuania (11 March 1990), Latvia (4 May 1990), and Estonia (20 August 1991); Independence referendums in Lithuania (9 February 1991), Latvia (3 March 1991), Estonia (3 March 1991); Soviet Union recognizes the independence of the Baltic states (6 September 1991); Restoration of multi-party democracy in all three countries; Transition to a market economy in all three countries; Withdrawal of Soviet and then Russian troops from Lithuania by 1993, and Latvia and Estonia by 1994

Parties
Estonia; Popular Front; Citizens' Committee; Congress of Estonia; Heritage Society; MRP-AEG; National Independence Party; Social Democratic Independence Party; (Estonian Soviet Socialist Republic) Communist Party of Estonia (pro-independence faction); Social Democratic Party; Latvia; Popular Front; Helsinki-86; National Independence Movement; Citizens' Congress; Environmental Protection Club; (Latvian Soviet Socialist Republic) Communist Party of Latvia (pro-independence faction); Social Democratic Party; Lithuania; Sąjūdis; Liberty League; Democratic Party; Christian Democratic Party; Social Democratic Party; (Lithuanian Soviet Socialist Republic) Communist Party of Lithuania (pro-independence faction); Democratic Labour Party; Riflemen's Union; Supported by: /Russian SFSR	Soviet Union; Soviet Armed Forces; KGB; OMON; Internal Troops; Militsiya; Communist Party of the Soviet Union; (Estonian Soviet Socialist Republic) Communist Party of Estonia (pro-Moscow faction); (Latvian Soviet Socialist Republic) Communist Party of Latvia (pro-Moscow faction); (Lithuanian Soviet Socialist Republic) Communist Party of Lithuania (pro-Moscow faction); Interfront; Intermovement; Interfront of Latvia; Yedinstvo

Lead figures
(Estonia) Lennart Meri; (Estonia) Tunne Kelam; (Estonia) Edgar Savisaar; (Estonia) Mart Laar; (Estonia) Trivimi Velliste; (Estonia) Marju Lauristin; (Estonia) Alo Mattiisen; (Estonia) Ülo Nugis; (Estonia) Arnold Rüütel; (Latvia) Anatolijs Gorbunovs; (Latvia) Ivars Godmanis; (Latvia) Eduards Berklavs; (Latvia) Einars Repše; (Latvia) Dainis Īvāns; (Latvia) Konstantins Pupurs; (Latvia) Romualds Ražuks; (Lithuania) Vytautas Landsbergis; (Lithuania) Kazimira Prunskienė; (Lithuania) Albertas Šimėnas; (Lithuania) Gediminas Vagnorius; (Lithuania) Audrius Butkevičius; (Lithuania) Algirdas Brazauskas; (Lithuania) Arvydas Juozaitis; / (Russian Soviet Federative Socialist Republic) Boris Yeltsin	(Soviet Union) Mikhail Gorbachev; (Soviet Union) Vadim Bakatin; (Soviet Union) Vladimir Kryuchkov; (Soviet Union) Dmitry Yazov; (Soviet Union) Vladislav Achalov; (Soviet Union) Mikhail Golovatov; (Soviet Union) Vladimir Uskhopchik; (Soviet Union) Vladimir Antyufeyev; (Soviet Union) Viktor Alksnis; (Latvian Soviet Socialist Republic) Boris Pugo; (Latvian Soviet Socialist Republic) Alfrēds Rubiks; (Lithuanian Soviet Socialist Republic) Mykolas Burokevičius; (Lithuanian Soviet Socialist Republic) Ringaudas Songaila; (Estonian Soviet Socialist Republic) Karl Vaino

The Singing Revolution (Note: Estonian: laulev revolutsioon; Latvian: dziesmotā revolūcija; Lithuanian: dainuojanti revoliucija.) was a series of events from 1987 to 1991 that led to the restoration of independence of the three Soviet-occupied Baltic countries of Estonia, Latvia, and Lithuania at the end of the Cold War. The Soviet Union annexed the Baltics around 1940, following the Molotov-Ribbentrop Pact (a non-aggression agreement with Nazi Germany), though this annexation was not widely recognized. During the subsequent occupation, the Soviet Union suppressed local languages, religious institutions, and cultural expression, and carried out large-scale deportations and political repression.

In the late 1980s, massive demonstrations against the Soviet regime began after widespread liberalization of the regime failed to take national sensitivities into account. The Soviet Union also instituted attacks and censorships of religion and the religious institutions in Latvia, Lithuania, and Estonia. Several religious organizations formed in opposition to these attacks. Civic organizations such as Sąjūdis in Lithuania, the Popular Front of Latvia, and the Estonian Popular Front coordinated petitions, rallies, and public forums to express dissent. Public song festivals became a key element of resistance, as tens of thousands of participants sang national and folk songs in mass gatherings.

The state of affairs deteriorated to such an extent that by 1989, there were campaigns aimed at freeing the nations from the Soviet Union altogether. The Baltic peoples staged mass demonstrations against Soviet rule, most notably the Baltic Way of 1989 on the 50th anniversary of the Nazi-Soviet pact. Approximately two million people joined hands to form a continuous human chain across Estonia, Latvia, and Lithuania to symbolize unity and a popular commitment to independence.

In 1988–89, the three countries proclaimed sovereignty within the Soviet Union, the first republics to do so. Lithuania declared independence in March 1990, followed by Latvia and Estonia in May. Soviet government economic pressure and armed crackdowns in Lithuania and Latvia failed, including the January 1991 assault on Vilnius in which armed Soviet forces killed 14 people. Citizens relied on civic committees, public readings of historical texts, and symbolic displays such as national flags to maintain pressure on Soviet authorities. Following the failed August Coup by Communist hardliners, various countries began to recognize Baltic independence. The Soviet Union recognized the three Baltic states in September 1991, over two months before its final dissolution. All three countries joined the EU and NATO in 2004.

== Background ==
Following the Molotov-Ribbentrop Pact of 1939, the Soviet Union invaded and occupied the three Baltic countries, annexing them as republics. This annexation was not widely recognized. In particular, the United States refused to recognize the annexation neither de facto nor de jure and continued to host Baltic diplomats in Washington, DC. Nazi Germany occupied the Baltic states during its invasion of the Soviet Union in 1941, but the Soviet Union reconquered the three countries in 1944–45. Thereafter the Soviets faced widespread armed resistance from Baltic Forest Brothers, which was largely defeated by the early 1950s. Thereafter, a dissident underground movement remained in the Soviet-controlled Baltic states, with sporadic acts of public dissent occurring.

The Soviet Union had moved to replace the native languages in Estonia, Latvia, and Lithuania with Russian in the late 1970s, starting with the implementation of all-union bilingualism programs . These attempts by the Soviets were largely unsuccessful, particularly in Estonia. The Estonian language played a integral role in their culture, and was not easily given up for Russian. Despite the Soviet Union crafting a society in which a proficiency with the Russian language was necessary for employment, education, and good social standing, the Estonians kept hold of their native language, in part through gathering to sing in their native tongue.

The situation in Estonia, Latvia, and Lithuania was worsened by their massively increasing immigrant populations. There was little gain for immigrants to learn the native language, being that Russian was used so commonly in higher employment and education. The large influx of Russian speaking people, particularly in urban settings, rendered the countries native languages inferior.

In 1985, the last leader of the former Soviet Union, Mikhail Gorbachev introduced glasnost ("openness") and perestroika ("restructuring"), hoping to stimulate the failing Soviet economy and encourage productivity, particularly in the areas of consumer goods, the liberalization of cooperative businesses, and growing the service economy. Glasnost rescinded limitations on political freedoms in the Soviet Union, which led to problems for the Soviet central government in retaining control over non-Russian areas, including the occupied Baltic countries.

Hitherto unrecognized issues previously kept secret by the Soviet central government in Moscow were admitted to in public, causing further popular dissatisfaction with the Soviet regime in Estonia, Latvia, and Lithuania. Combined with the war in Afghanistan and the nuclear fallout in Chernobyl, grievances were aired in a publicly explosive and politically decisive manner. Estonians were concerned about the demographic threat to their national identity posed by the influx of individuals from foreign ethnic groups to work on such large Soviet development projects as phosphate mining.

== Description ==
The Singing Revolution is the name given to the series of events from 1987 to 1991 that led to the restoration of independence of the three Soviet-occupied Baltic countries of Estonia, Latvia, and Lithuania at the end of the Cold War. The term was coined by an Estonian activist and artist, Heinz Valk, in an article published a week after the 10–11 June 1988 spontaneous mass evening singing demonstrations at the Estonian Tallinn Song Festival Grounds.

Massive demonstrations against the Soviet regime began after widespread liberalization of the regime failed to take into account national sensitivities. Moscow hoped that the non-Russian nations would remain within the USSR despite the removal of restrictions on freedom of speech and national icons (such as the local pre-1940 flags). However, the situation deteriorated to such an extent that by 1989, there were campaigns aimed at freeing the nations from the Soviet Union altogether. The Baltic peoples staged mass demonstrations against Soviet rule, most notably the Baltic Way of 1989 on the 50th anniversary of the Nazi-Soviet pact. In 1988–89, the three countries proclaimed sovereignty within the Soviet Union, the first republics to do so.

Lithuania declared independence in March 1990, followed by Latvia and Estonia in May. The Soviet government attempted to crack down on this through economic pressure and then armed crackdowns in Lithuania and Latvia in January 1991, but failed. Following the failed August Coup by Communist hardliners, various countries began to recognize Baltic independence. The Soviet Union recognized the three Baltic states in September 1991, over two months before its final dissolution. Later, all three countries joined the EU and NATO in 2004.

== Religion ==
Soviet control and limitation of religion played a major role in the Singing Revolution. The Soviet Union's attacks on churches began in 1929, with the legislation that introduced the nationalization of church property, prohibited religious schools, and eliminated religious holidays, among other things. By 1985, churches in the three countries faced dire circumstances. Many churches shut down, and the ones that survived experienced limited clergy, resources, and a national attitude that moved toward atheism.

After nearly 50 years of Soviet restrictions and attacks on the churches, their positions as cornerstones of their communities had been severely weakened. The Soviet Union's plans to weaken the churches in Estonia, Latvia, and Lithuania had come to a head. The previously rudimentary attempts by the Soviets to push atheism had turned sophisticated, and many people saw themselves brought away from the struggling churches.

In 1985, clergy members in these churches began using new methods to draw people back. Parish priests began implementing rock music, summer camps, and an emphasis on nationalism. These changes ushered more people back to the church and the countries began to see a rise in religious participation once again. These changes contributed to the revitalization of the Chronicle of the Catholic Church in Lithuania, and the founding of the Society for Protection of National Heritage in Estonia in 1987.

Through this renewed sense of national pride, the churches, with the help of religious organizations, began organizing public singing events, both as an act of protest, and a way to draw their community together. By synchronizing the message of their churches with an anti-Soviet Union message of national pride, the churches propped themselves up to bolster the revolution, while centering themselves back into their communities. The singing events included a mix of religious songs, folk songs, and songs of national pride. The religious aspect of the Singing Revolution had a massive impact in its unification of the people and the platform churches gave for various organizing events.

== Nonviolent Strategies ==
The Singing Revolution is one of the most prominent examples of nonviolent collective action of the late twentieth century. Unlike many other struggles for national self-determination during the Cold War, the movements of Estonia, Latvia, and Lithuania deliberately adopted strategies of civil resistance rather than armed confrontation. The use of song, public gatherings, and symbolic acts enabled widespread participation while limiting the potential for violent escalation.

In each republic, cultural and civic organizations provided the initial frameworks for coordinated activism. Estonia’s Heritage Society, Latvia’s Environmental Protection Club, and Lithuania’s Sąjūdis movement emerged from officially sanctioned cultural or ecological associations and soon became central to organized political protest. Public events, historical commentaries, and mass singing festivals reframed dissent as expressions of national identity and moral renewal rather than as direct challenges to state authority.

The nonviolent approach was both cultural and strategic. Leaders of the Baltic independence movements drew on local traditions and international models of civil resistance to situate their actions within a broader discourse of peaceful change. This framing enhanced international legitimacy and helped attract support from Western governments by aligning the movements with global human rights principles.

Music and collective singing played a distinctive role in maintaining nonviolent discipline. Researchers have described these performances as a form of emotional disarmament, in which shared song helped sustain unity and reduce fear under conditions of repression. During major demonstrations – including the Tartu Pop Festival, the Baltic Way, and the 1991 protests in Vilnius and Riga – participants frequently sang national anthems and traditional songs, transforming public spaces into symbols of solidarity and peaceful resistance.

Although instances of provocation and limited Soviet military intervention occurred - most notably in Lithuania in January 1991 – the movements largely maintained a commitment to nonviolence. Disciplined civilian resistance contributed to the erosion of Soviet authority and accelerated its decline in the Baltic region. The Singing Revolution has been compared to other nonviolent transitions, such as those in East Germany and Czechoslovakia, all as primary examples of the use of cultural identity, moral conviction, and organized political strategy as successful nonviolent tactics.

== Estonia ==
The Soviet government's plan to excavate phosphorite in the Lääne-Viru county with potentially catastrophic consequences for the environment and society was revealed in February 1987. That started the "Phosphorite War", a public environmental campaign. The MRP-AEG group held the Hirvepark meeting in the Old Town of Tallinn on the anniversary of the Molotov–Ribbentrop Pact on 23 August 1987, demanding to disclose and condemn its secret protocol.

Access to Western émigré communities abroad and, particularly in Estonia, informal relations with Finland, and access to Finnish TV showing the Western lifestyle also contributed to widespread dissatisfaction with the Soviet system and provoked mass demonstrations as repression on dissidents, nationalists, religious communities, and ordinary consumers eased substantially towards the end of the 1980s.

The "Five Patriotic Songs" series by Alo Mattiisen premiered at the Tartu Pop Festival in May 1988. In June, the Old Town Festival was held in Tallinn, and after the official part of the festival, the participants moved to the Song Festival Grounds and started to sing patriotic songs together spontaneously. The Baltic Way, a human chain of two million people, spanned from Tallinn to Vilnius on 23 August 1989. Mattiisen's "Five Patriotic Songs" were performed again at the Rock Summer festival in Tallinn held on 26–28 August 1988. The Song of Estonia festival was held at the Song Festival Grounds on 11 September. Trivimi Velliste, Chairman of the Estonian Heritage Society, first voiced the public ambition to regain independence. The Supreme Soviet of Estonia issued the Estonian Sovereignty Declaration on 16 November.

The Singing Revolution lasted over four years, with various protests and acts of defiance. The revolution was led by three different groups: the Heritage Society, the Popular Front, and the National Independence Party. The Heritage Society, established in 1987, focused on spreading awareness about Estonia's history to gather support for Estonia's independence from the Soviets. The Popular Front, founded in 1988, wanted to reform Estonia into self-government within a loose confederation of the Soviet Union. The National Independence Party, established in 1988 as well, was more radical than the other two organizations and demanded complete independence from the Soviet Union.

In 1991, as the central government in Moscow and the Soviet Armed Forces and MVD attempted to stop the Estonian progress towards independence, the newly elected legislature of Estonia together with an elected grassroots parliament, Congress of Estonia, proclaimed the restoration of the independent state of Estonia and repudiated Soviet legislation. Large groups of unarmed volunteers went to shield the parliament, radio, and TV buildings from any attacks by Soviet troops. Through these actions, Estonia regained its independence without any blood shed.

Independence was declared on the late evening of 20 August 1991, after an agreement between different political parties was reached. The next morning, Soviet troops, according to Estonian TV, attempted to storm Tallinn TV Tower but were unsuccessful. The Communist hardliners' coup attempt failed amidst mass pro-democracy demonstrations in Moscow led by Boris Yeltsin.

On 22 August 1991, Iceland (independent country since 1944) announced the establishment of diplomatic relations with Estonia, and Iceland thus became the first foreign country to formally recognize the fully restored independence of Estonia in 1991. Today, a plaque commemorating this event is situated on the outside wall of the Foreign Ministry, which is on Islandi väljak 1, or "Iceland Square 1". The plaque reads; "The Republic of Iceland was the first to recognize, on 22 August 1991, the restoration of the independence of the Republic of Estonia", in Estonian, Icelandic, and English. Some other nations did not recognize the annexation of Estonia by the Soviet Union.

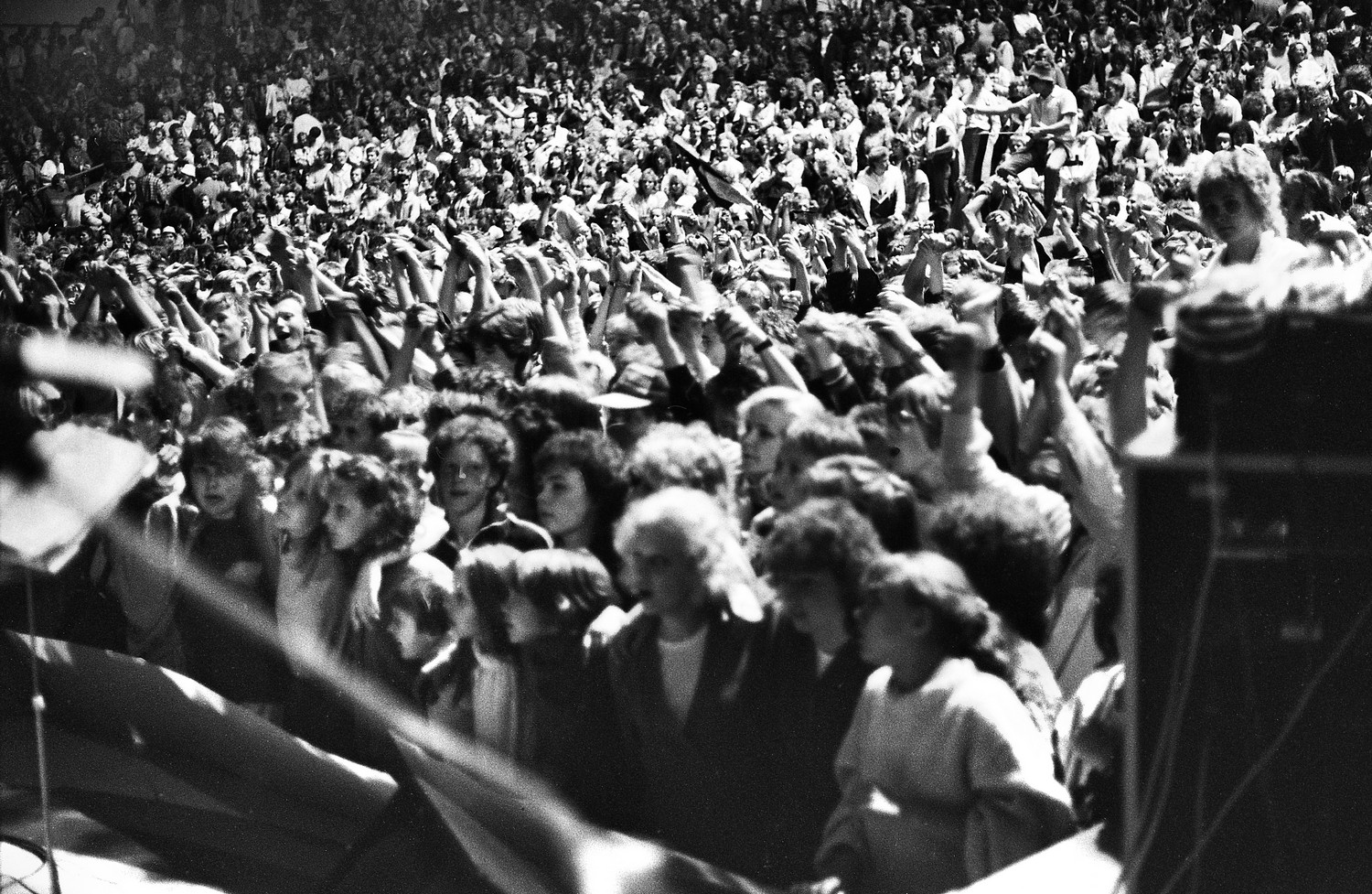

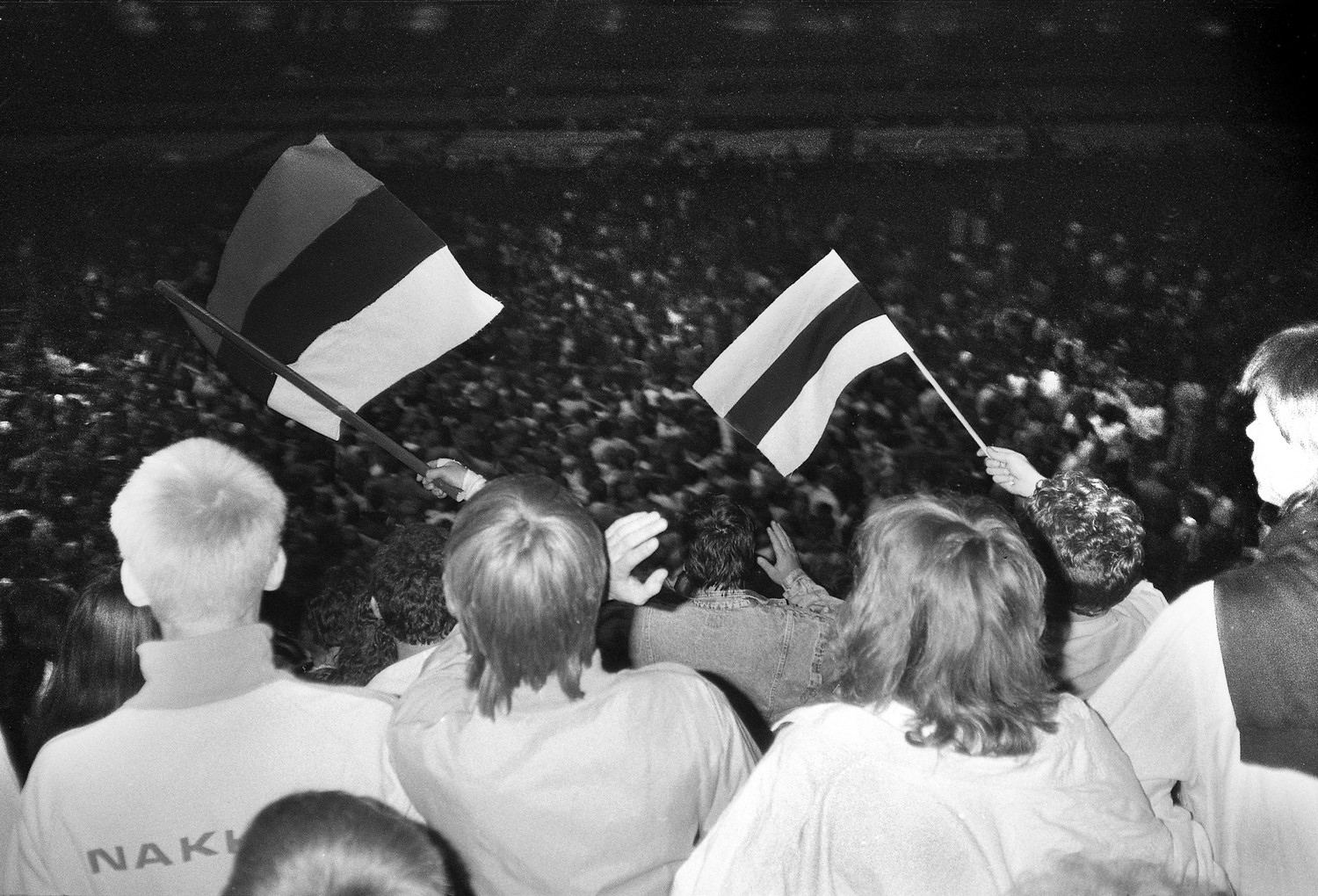

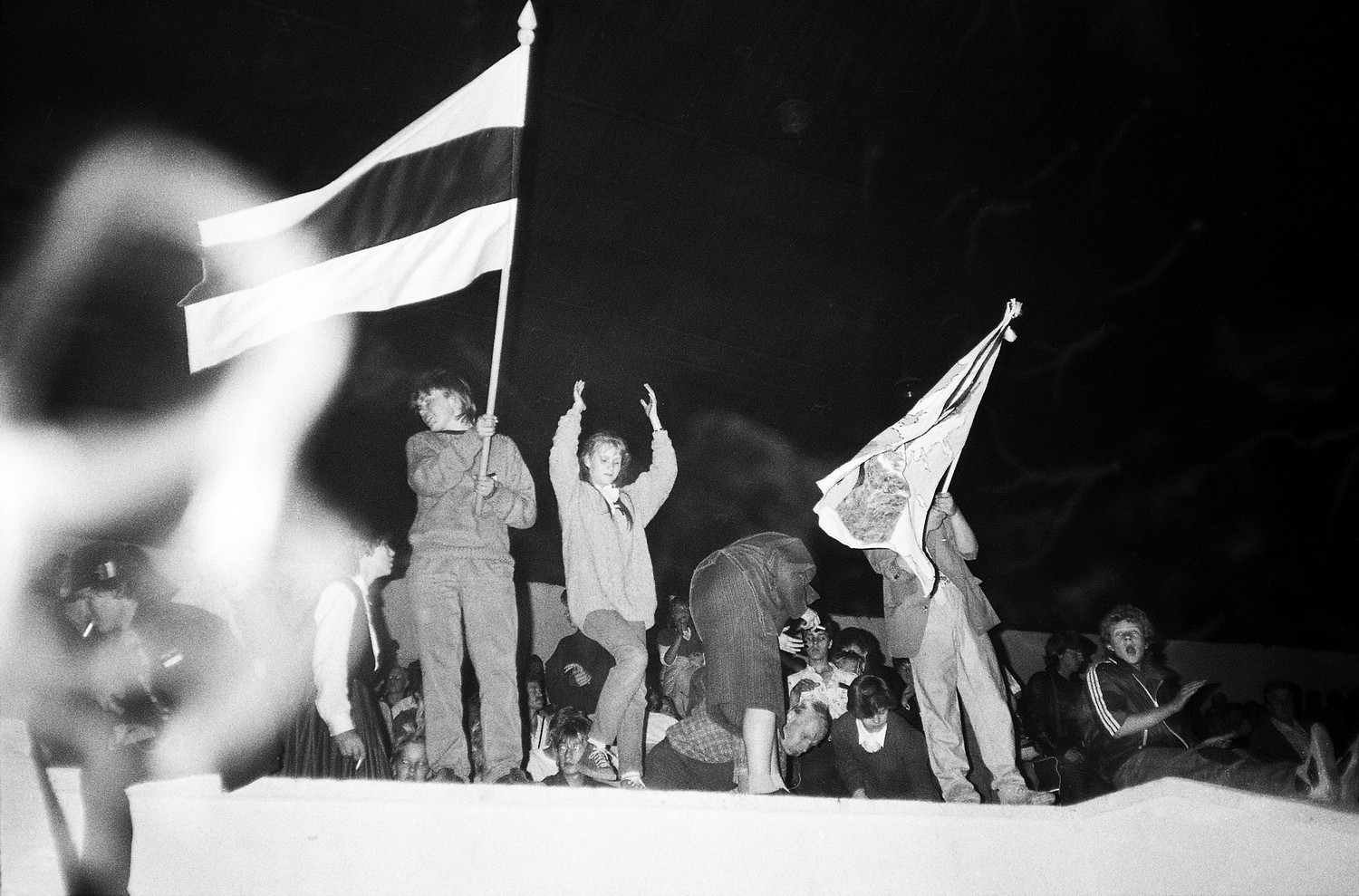

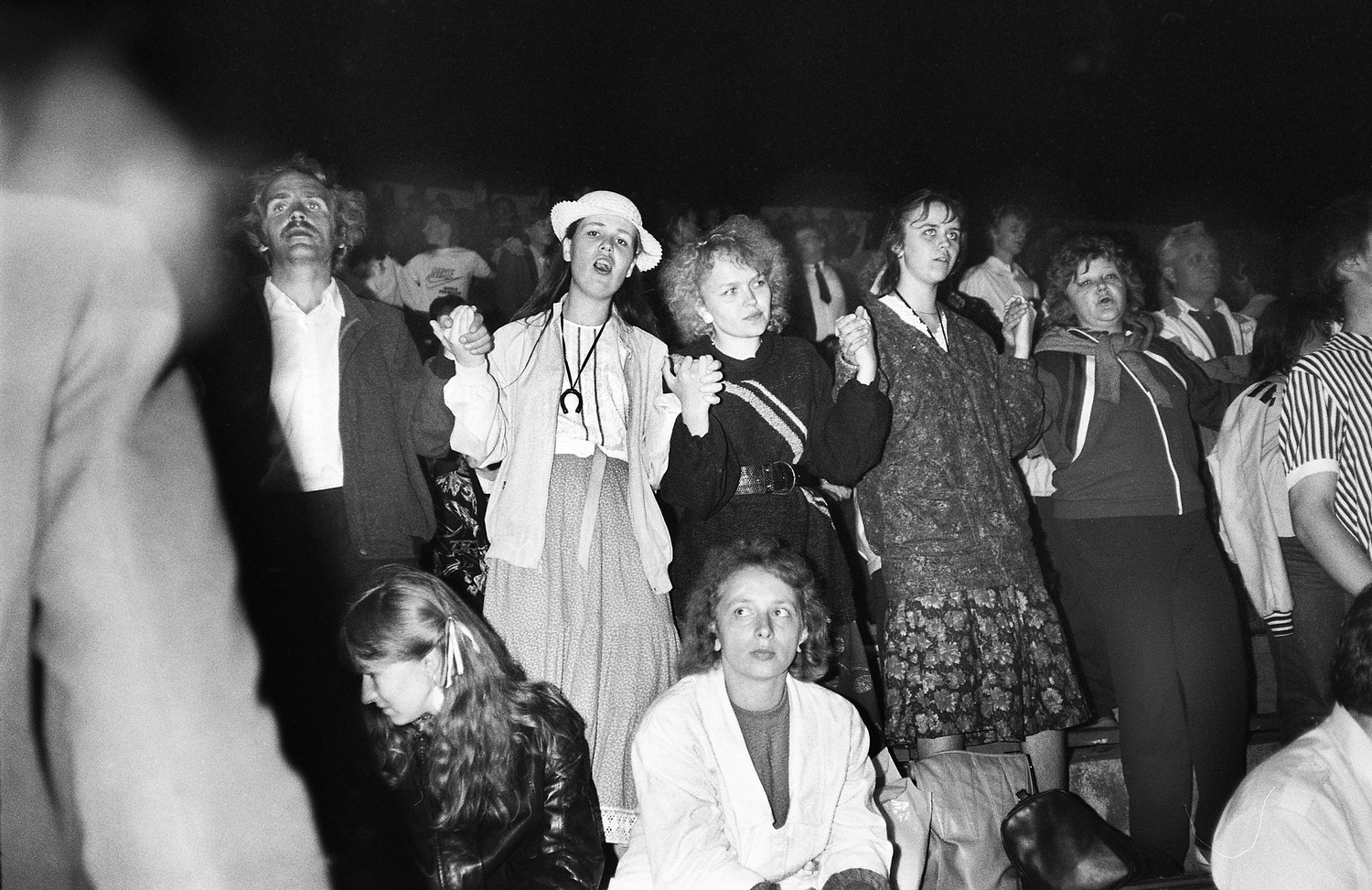

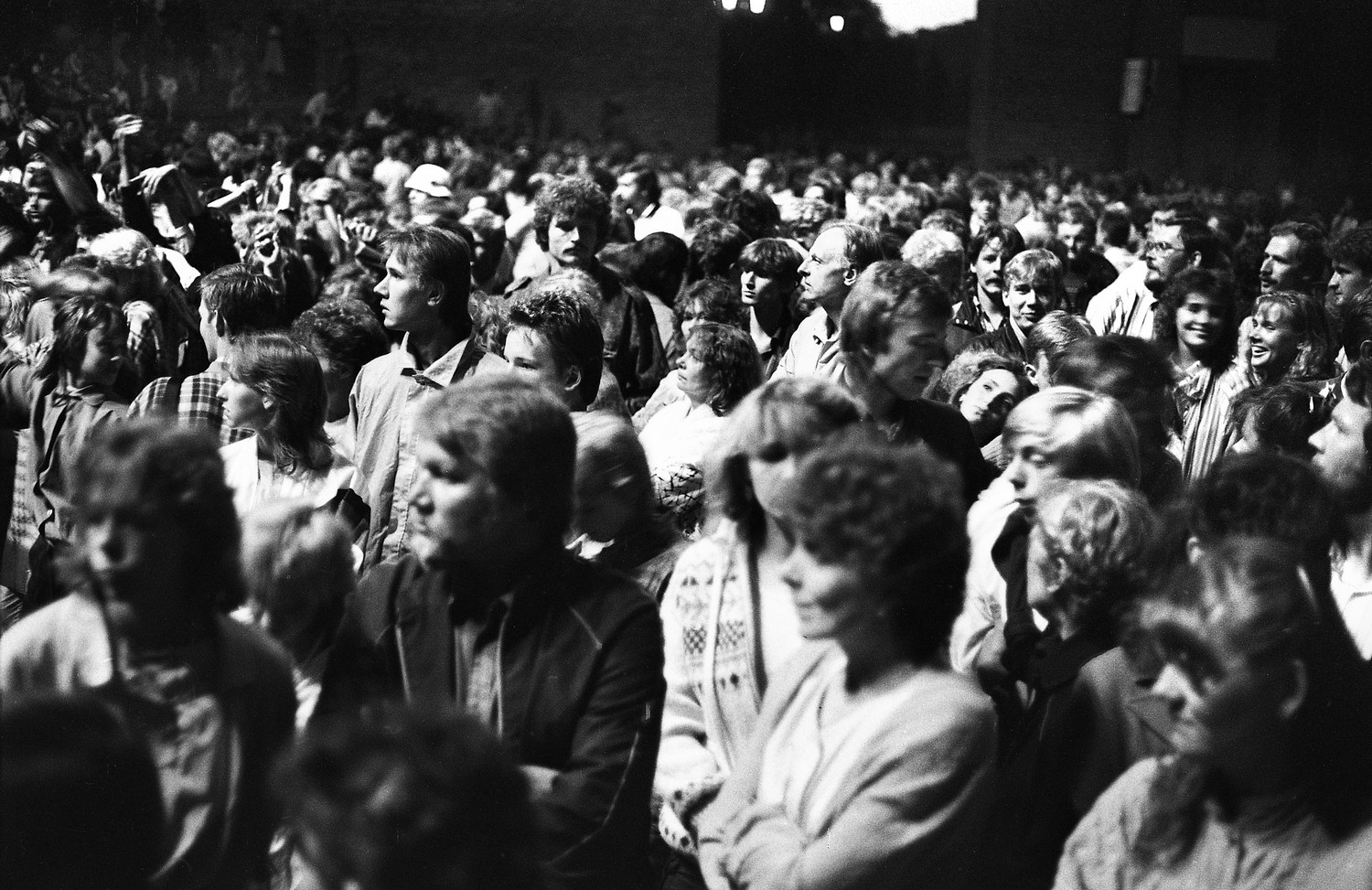

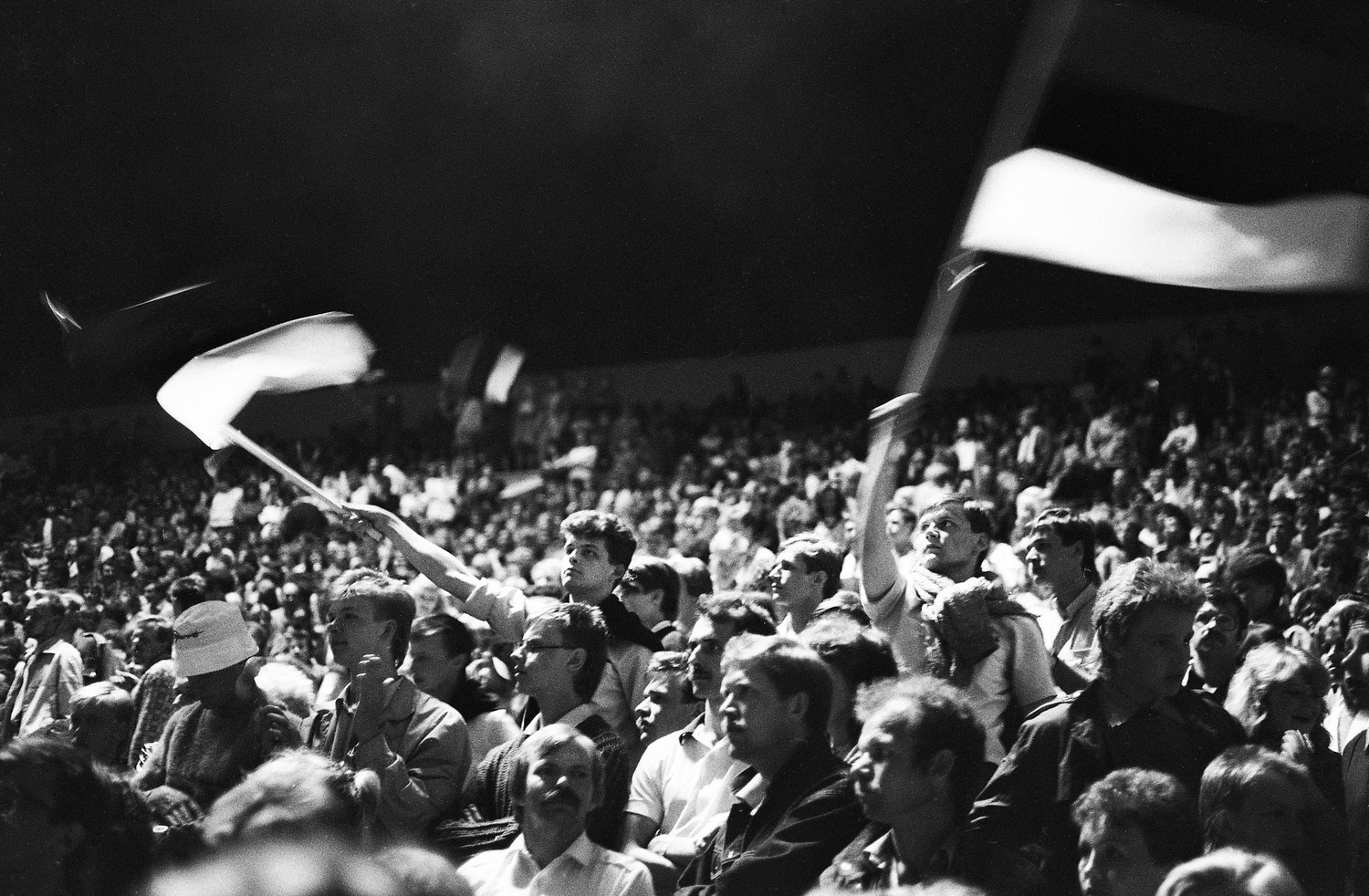

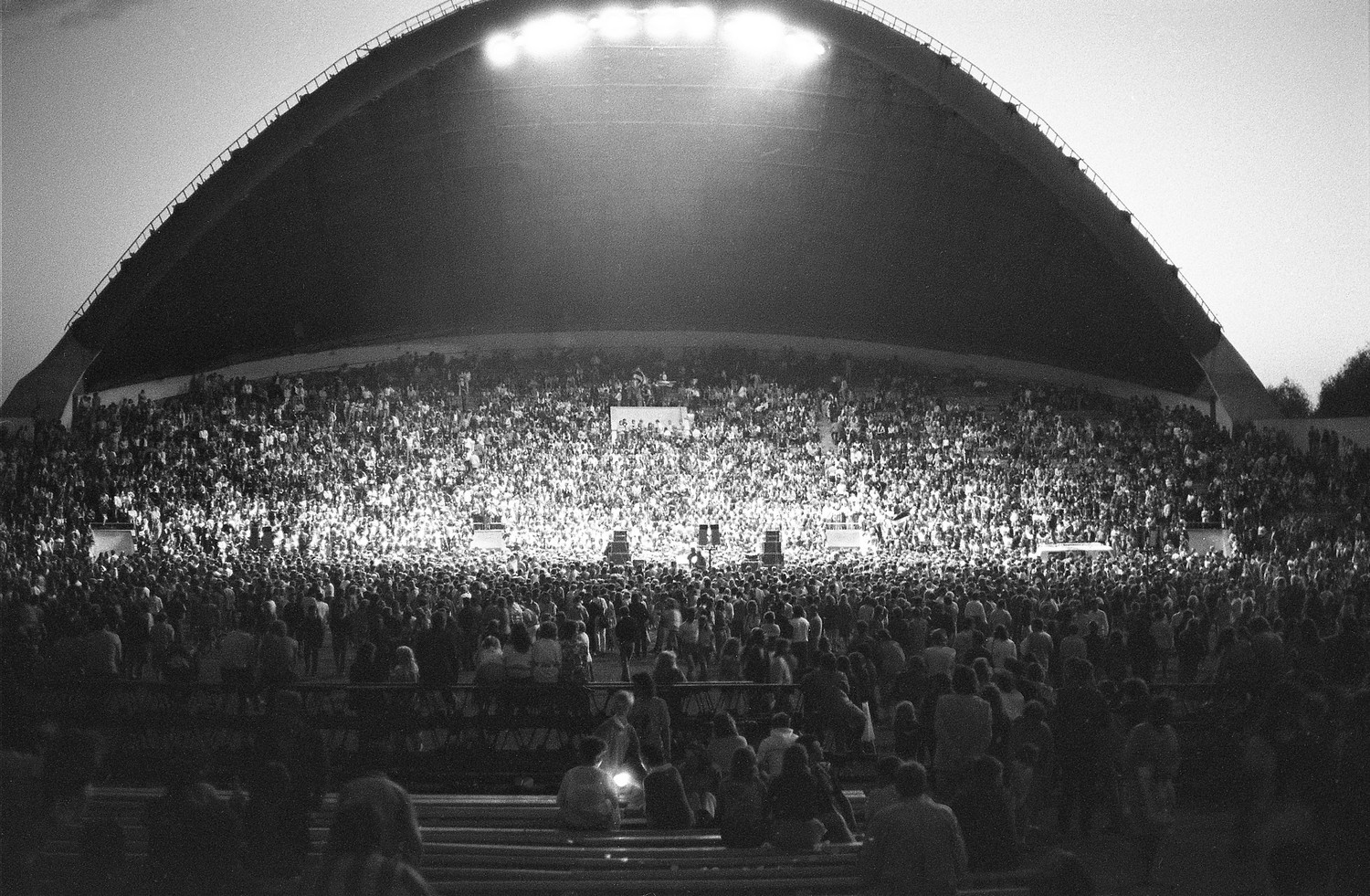

== Latvia ==
During the second half of the 1980s, as Mikhail Gorbachev introduced glasnost and perestroika in the USSR, which rolled back restrictions to freedom in the Soviet Union, aversion to the Soviet regime had grown into the third Latvian National Awakening, which reached its peak in mid-1988.

In 1986, it became widely known to the public that the USSR was planning to build another hydroelectric power plant on Latvia's largest river Daugava, and that a decision had been made to build a metro in Riga. Both of these projects planned by Moscow could have led to the destruction of Latvia's landscape and cultural and historical heritage. In the press, journalists urged the public to protest against these decisions. The public reacted immediately, and in response, the Environmental Protection Club was founded on 28 February 1987. During the second half of the 1980s, the Environmental Protection Club became one of the most influential mass movements in the region and began to make demands for the restoration of Latvia's independence.

On 14 June 1987, the anniversary of the 1941 deportations, the human rights group "Helsinki-86", which had been founded a year earlier, organized people to place flowers at the Freedom Monument (Latvia's symbol of independence, which was erected in 1935). This is widely cited as the beginning of the National Awakening. However, the Latvian Song and Dance Festival of 1985 also had been sometimes named as such for choirs requesting and performing the song Gaismas pils conducted by Haralds Mednis after the main event. The song, which speaks about the rebirth of a free Latvian nation, usually a staple of the festival, had been removed from the repertoire; the conductor, disliked by Soviet authorities, was sidelined at the closing concert. He was called from his seat by the choir and 'Gaismas pils' was performed, airing live on Riga Television.

On 1 and 2 June 1988, the Writers' Union held a congress during which the democratization of society, Latvia's economic sovereignty, the cessation of immigration from the USSR, the transformation of industry, and the protection of Latvian language rights were discussed by delegates. Over the course of this conference, for the first time in post-war Latvia, the secret protocol of the Molotov–Ribbentrop Pact, which had determined Latvia's fate after 1939, was publicly acknowledged.

The congress of the Writers' Union stirred up public opinion and provided an additional stimulus for the general process of national revival.

In the summer of 1988, two of the most important organizations of the revival period began to assemble themselves—the Latvian People's Front and the Latvian National Independence Movement (LNIM). Soon afterwards, the more radically inclined Citizens' Congress called for complete non-compliance with the representatives of the Soviet regime. All of these organizations had a common goal: the restoration of democracy and independence. On 7 October 1988, there was a mass public demonstration, calling for Latvia's independence and the establishment of a regular judicial order. On 8 and 9 October, the first congress of the Latvian People's Front was held. This organization, which attracted 200,000 members, became the main representative of the return to independence.

On 23 August 1989, the fiftieth anniversary of the Molotov–Ribbentrop Pact, the People's Fronts of all three Baltic countries held a huge demonstration of unity—the "Baltic Way". A 600-kilometre-long (373 mi) human "chain" from Tallinn through Riga to Vilnius was assembled. This was a symbolic demonstration of the people's call for independence from the Soviet Union.

New elections to the Supreme Soviet took place on 18 March 1990, in which the supporters of independence gained a victory. On 4 May 1990, the new Supreme Soviet of the Latvian SSR adopted a motion, "Declaration of Independence", which called for the restoration of the inter-war Latvian state and the 1922 Constitution.

In January 1991, however, pro-communist political forces attempted to restore Soviet power. With the use of force, attempts were made to overthrow the new assembly. Latvian demonstrators managed to stop the Soviet troops from re-occupying strategic positions, and these events are known as the "Days of the Barricades".

On 19 August 1991, an unsuccessful attempt at a coup d'état took place in Moscow when a small group of prominent Soviet functionaries failed to regain power due to large pro-democracy demonstrations in Russia. This event resulted in Latvia swiftly moving toward independence. After the coup's failure, the Supreme Soviet of the Latvian Republic announced, on 21 August 1991, that the transition period to full independence declared on 4 May 1990 had come to an end. Therefore, Latvia was proclaimed a fully independent nation whose judicial foundation stemmed back to the statehood that existed before the occupation on 17 June 1940.

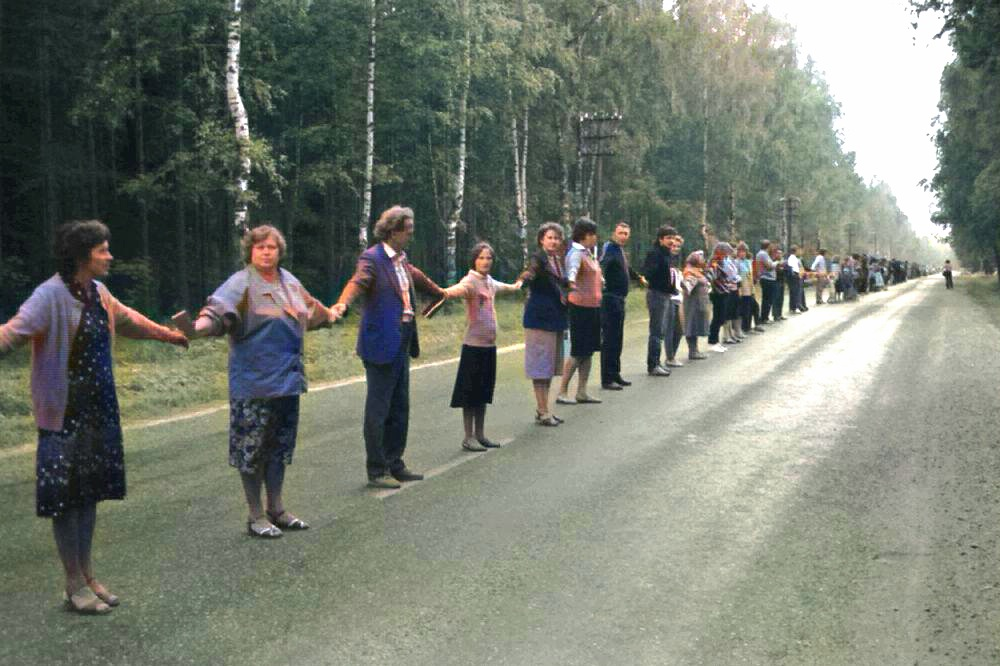
Baltic Way participants between Cēsis and Valmiera

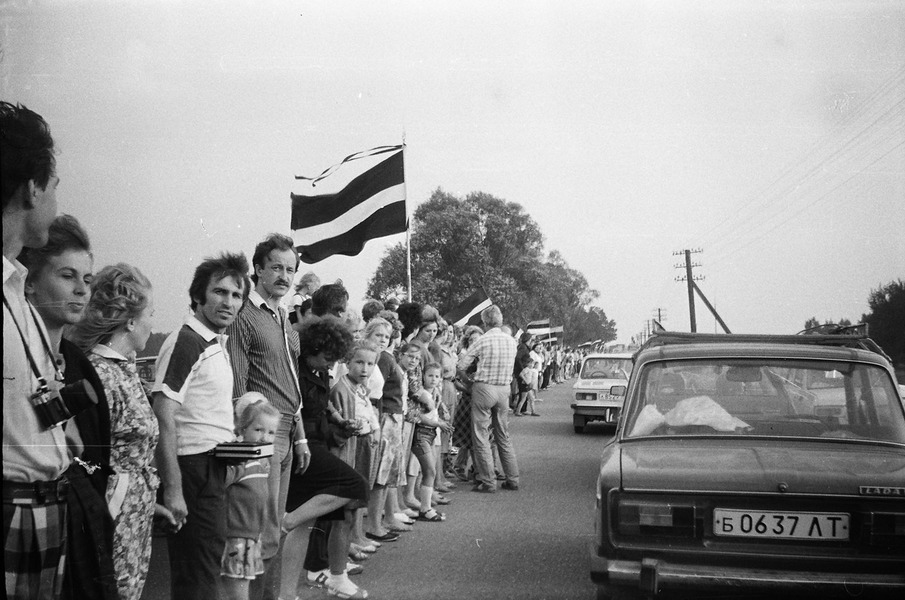
Participants near Ķekava

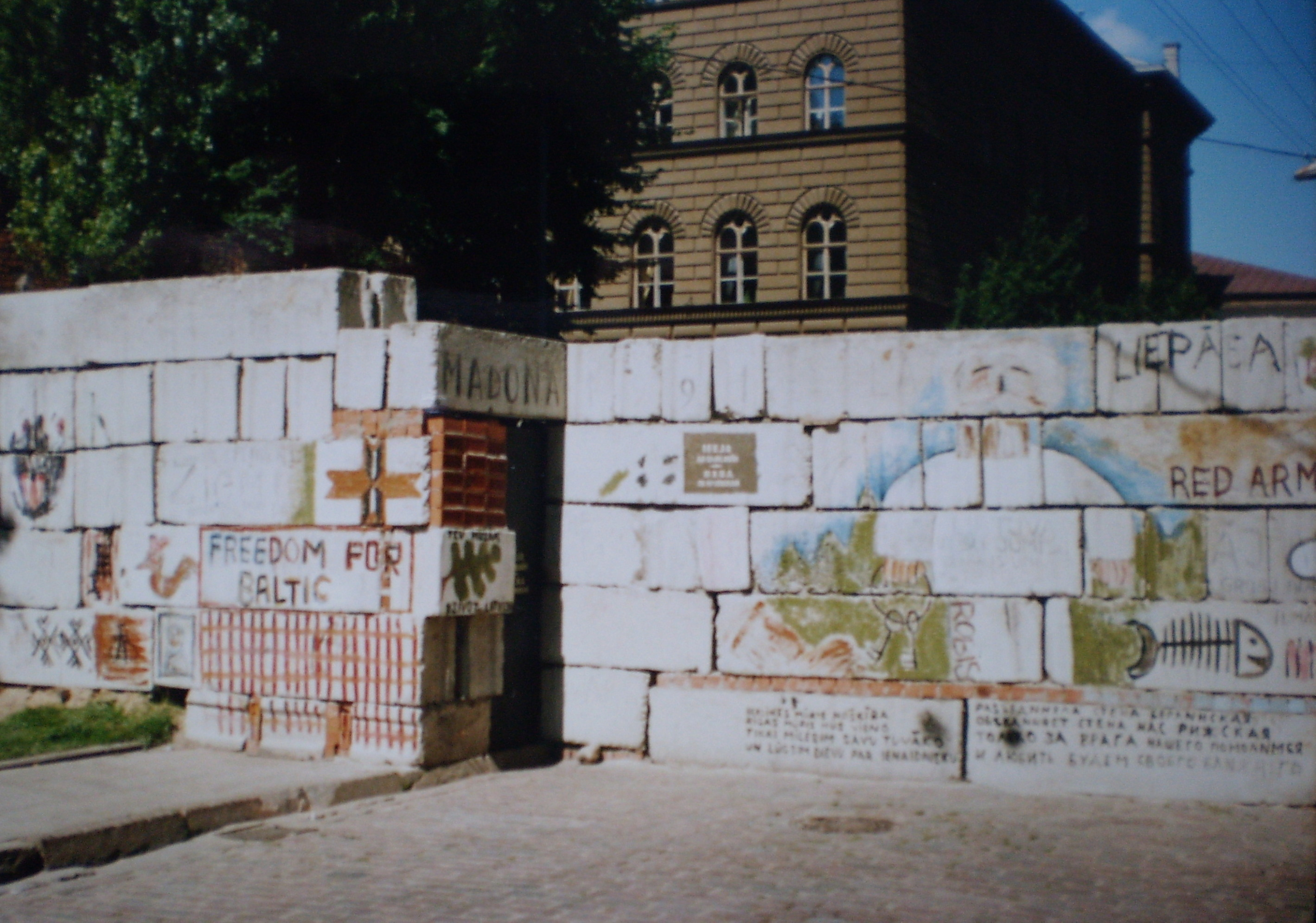
The Barricades in Riga in 1991

== Lithuania ==
Between 1956 and 1987, open public resistance to the Soviet regime was rare. It became more persistent in the 1970s and 1980s. One example of this could be the Kaunas events of 1972. Many popular singers often used the poetry of nationalist poets, such as Bernardas Brazdžionis or Justinas Marcinkevičius, as the lyrics of their songs. In 1987, the Rock March also promoted awareness of the issue among the people.

In 1987, various organizations (mainly environmental ones) were founded. On 3 June 1988, the Sąjūdis, a political and social movement, was established. Some initiators of this movement were active members of environmental organizations, established in 1987 (e.g. Zigmas Vaišvila, Gintaras Songaila). Initially, this organization supported the regime, but in early autumn of the same year, after Lithuania-wide growth, it became an opposing force to the CPL.

In response to this, Sąjūdis became a more centralized organization. The active nationalist opposition (mostly the Lithuanian Liberty League) towards the regime culminated in various public protests. The most notorious of them took place on 28 September 1988, which ended up with violent dispersal. The resulting public anger caused resignations in the Communist Party of Lithuania (including the then-First Secretary of the party, Ringaudas Songaila, who served just over a year) and replaced them with more moderate members.

As the CPL leadership changed, it decided to return Vilnius Cathedral, formerly used as a museum of fine arts, to the Catholic community on 21 October 1988. The national anthem of Lithuania and the traditional national Tricolore were legalized in Lithuania on 18 November 1988, officially replacing the flag and the anthem of the Lithuanian Soviet Socialist Republic. It was followed by the recognition of the Lithuanian language as a state language, which meant that it became the sole legal language on an institutional level. The latter change was instrumental in the removal of some officials (e.g. Nikolai Mitkin, who served as the Second Secretary of the CPL), but fueled tensions in Polish and Russian speaking communities.

It was followed by the gradual rebuilding of national symbols, which included erecting or restoring independence monuments throughout the country in late 1988 and 1989.

During 1989, various organisations (e.g. The Writers Union) split from the Soviet ones. Prior to the election of the Congress of People's Deputies of the Soviet Union, Sąjūdis media became more restricted, but after the defeat of the CPL (it won just six seats of 42, other seats were won by Sąjūdis supported candidates), restrictions were lifted. By the end of the year, the CPL gave up its power monopoly and agreed to hold free elections for Supreme Soviet of Lithuanian SSR in 1990, which it lost.

Five decades after Lithuania was occupied and incorporated into the Soviet Union, Lithuania became the first republic to declare its independence from the USSR on 11 March 1990, while Estonia and Latvia declared Soviet rule to have been illegal from the start and since full restoration of independence was not yet feasible, started a period of transition towards independence, culminating with the failure of the August coup. For the same reason, almost all nations in the international community, except Iceland, hesitated to recognize independence for Lithuania until August 1991.

The Soviet military responded harshly. On 13 January 1991, fourteen non-violent protesters in Vilnius died and hundreds were injured defending the Vilnius Television Tower and the Parliament from Soviet assault troops and tanks. Lithuanians refer to the event as Day of the Defenders of Freedom. The discipline and courage of its citizens – linking arms and singing in the face of tanks and armour-piercing bullets – avoided a much greater loss of life and showed the world that Lithuania's citizens were prepared to defend their national independence.

International governments began recognizing Lithuanian independence after the failure of the coup d'état in August 1991.

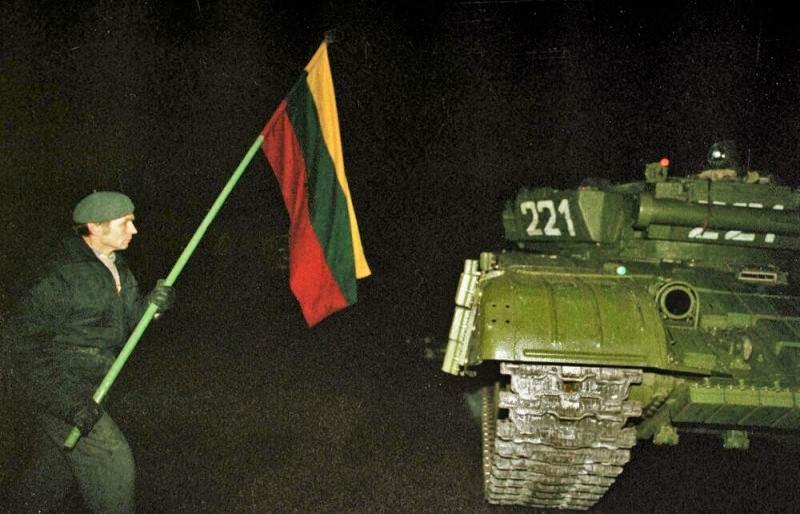
A man with a Lithuanian flag in front of a Soviet tank, 13 January 1991

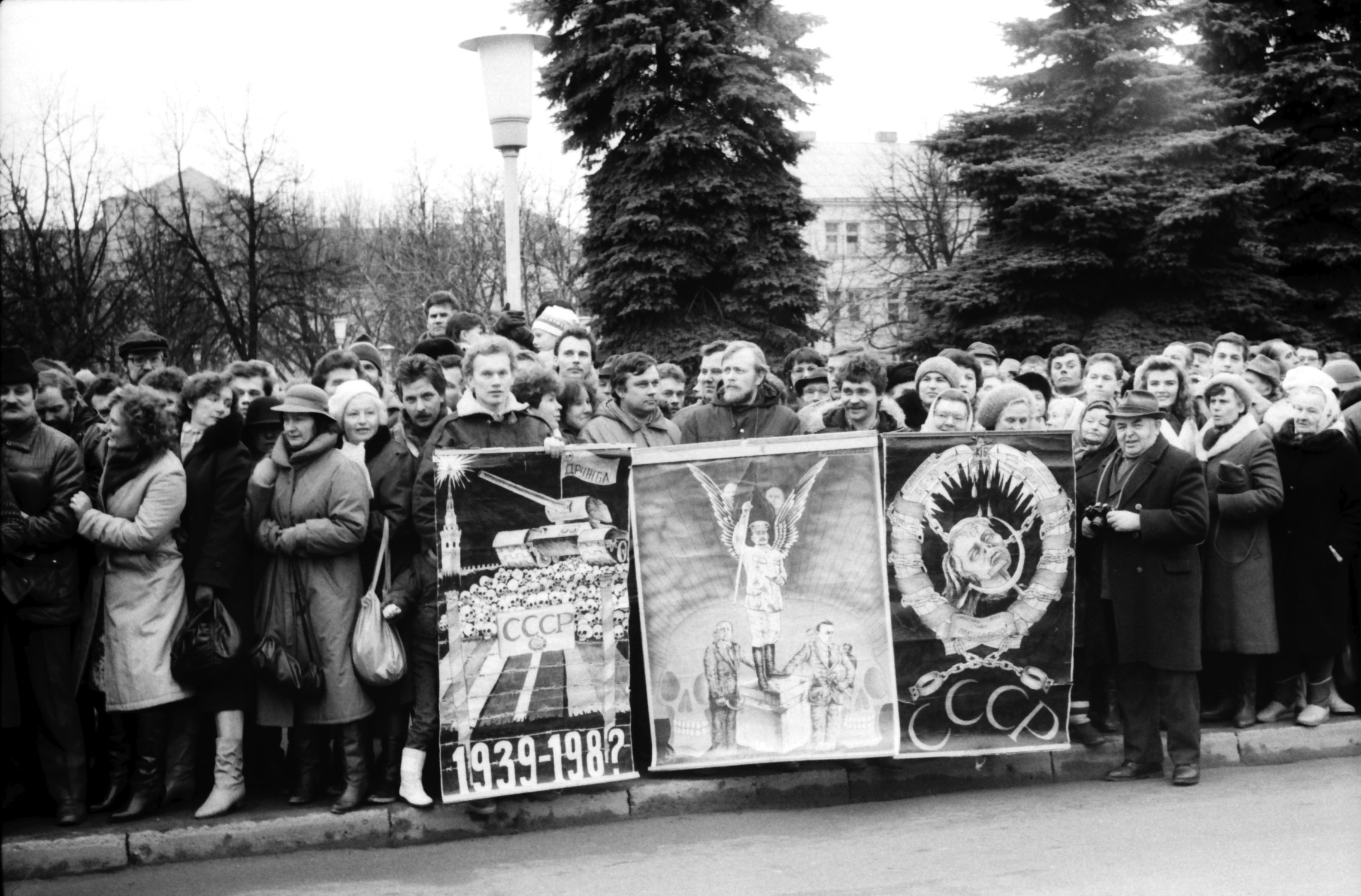
Lithuanian people in Šiauliai (Gorbachev visit, 1990)

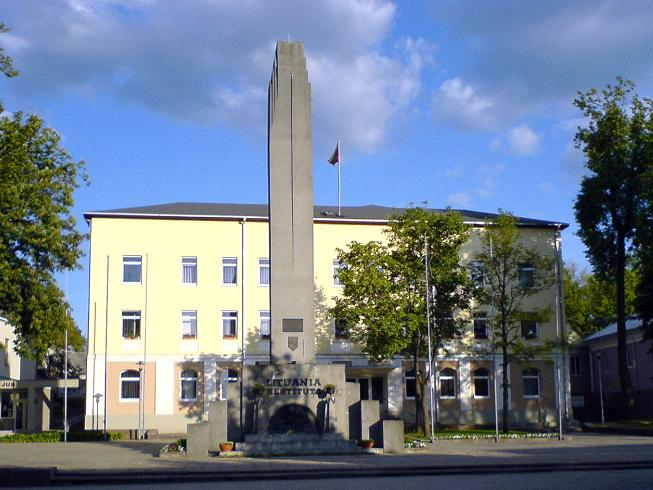
Ukmergė's monument of independence, Lituania Restituta, restored in 1989

== Notable protest songs ==
- "The Baltics Are Waking Up" (Lithuanian: Bunda jau Baltija, Latvian: Atmostas Baltija, Estonian: Ärgake, Baltimaad) (LIT/LAT/EST)
- "Brīvību Baltijai" (LAT) ("Freedom for the Baltics")
- "Dzimtā valoda" (LAT) ("Mother tongue")
- OST from the rock opera "Lāčplēsis" (LAT) ("Bear Slayer", released 1988)
- "Manai Tautai" (LAT) ("To My Nation")
- "Gaismas pils" (LAT) ("Castle of Light")
- "Pūt, Vējiņi!" – Latvian version of a Livonian wedding folk song ("Pūgõ tūļ") and often used in place of the national anthem during the Soviet era. (LAT) ("Blow, Winds!")
- "Saule, Pērkons, Daugava" (LAT) ("Sun, Thunder, Daugava")
- "Ei ole üksi ükski maa" (EST) ("There Is No Land Alone")
- "Eestlane olen ja eestlaseks jään" (EST) ("Estonian I Am and Estonian I Will Be")
- "Isamaa ilu hoieldes" (EST) ("Keeping the Beauty of Fatherland")
- "Sind surmani" (EST) ("Until I Die")
- "Mingem üles mägedele" (EST) ("Let's Go up the Mountains")
- "Laisvė" (canonical perf. Eurika Masytė) (LIT) ("Freedom")
- "Palaimink Dieve mus" (LIT) ("God Bless Us")
- "Dėl Tos Dainos" (LIT) ("For That Song")
- "Pabudome ir kelkimės" (LIT) ("We Woke Up, Now Let's Get Up")
- "Kokia nuostabi, Lietuva esi" (canonical perf. Kipras Mašanauskas) (LIT) ("How amazing you are, Lithuania")
- "Šaukiu aš tautą" (canonical perf. Vytautas Kernagis) (LIT) ("I Call the Nation")
- "Tėvyne dainų ir artojų" (canonical perf. Rondo) (LIT) ("Homeland of Songs and Sons of the Soil")
- "Mano mylimoji / per pasaulio sniegą ..." (canonical perf. Gintarė Jautakaitė) (LIT) ("My Beloved/Through the Snow of the World")
- "Broli, neverk!" (LIT) ("Brother, Don't Cry")
- "Pīmiņ bruoļ" (LTG) ("Remember, Brother") Latgalian awakening song.

== See also ==
- Baltic Way
- Dissolution of the Soviet Union
- Forest Brothers
- Nonviolent revolution
- Revolutions of 1989
