= Alo Mattiisen =

Estonian musician and composer

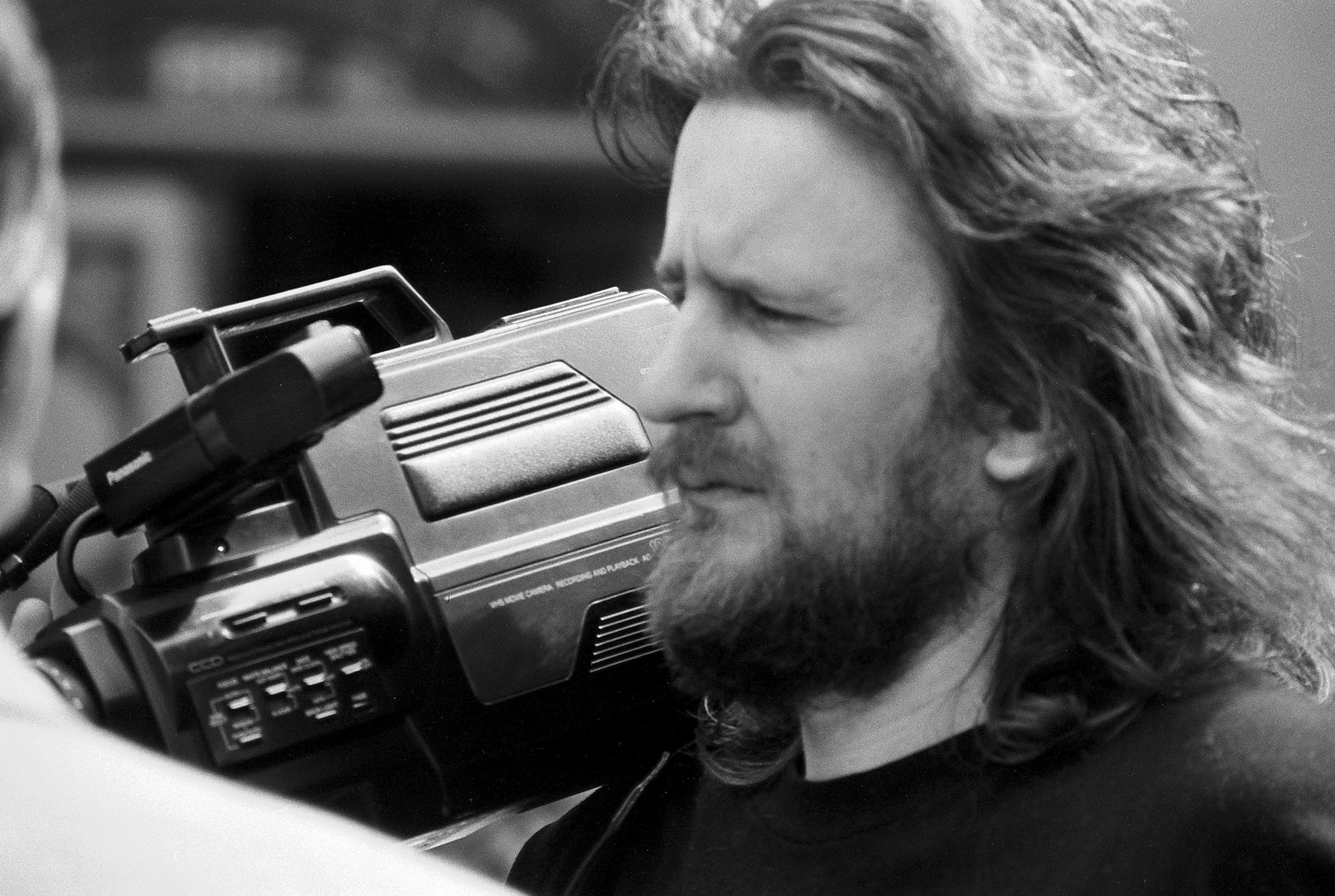
Alo Mattiisen in 1988

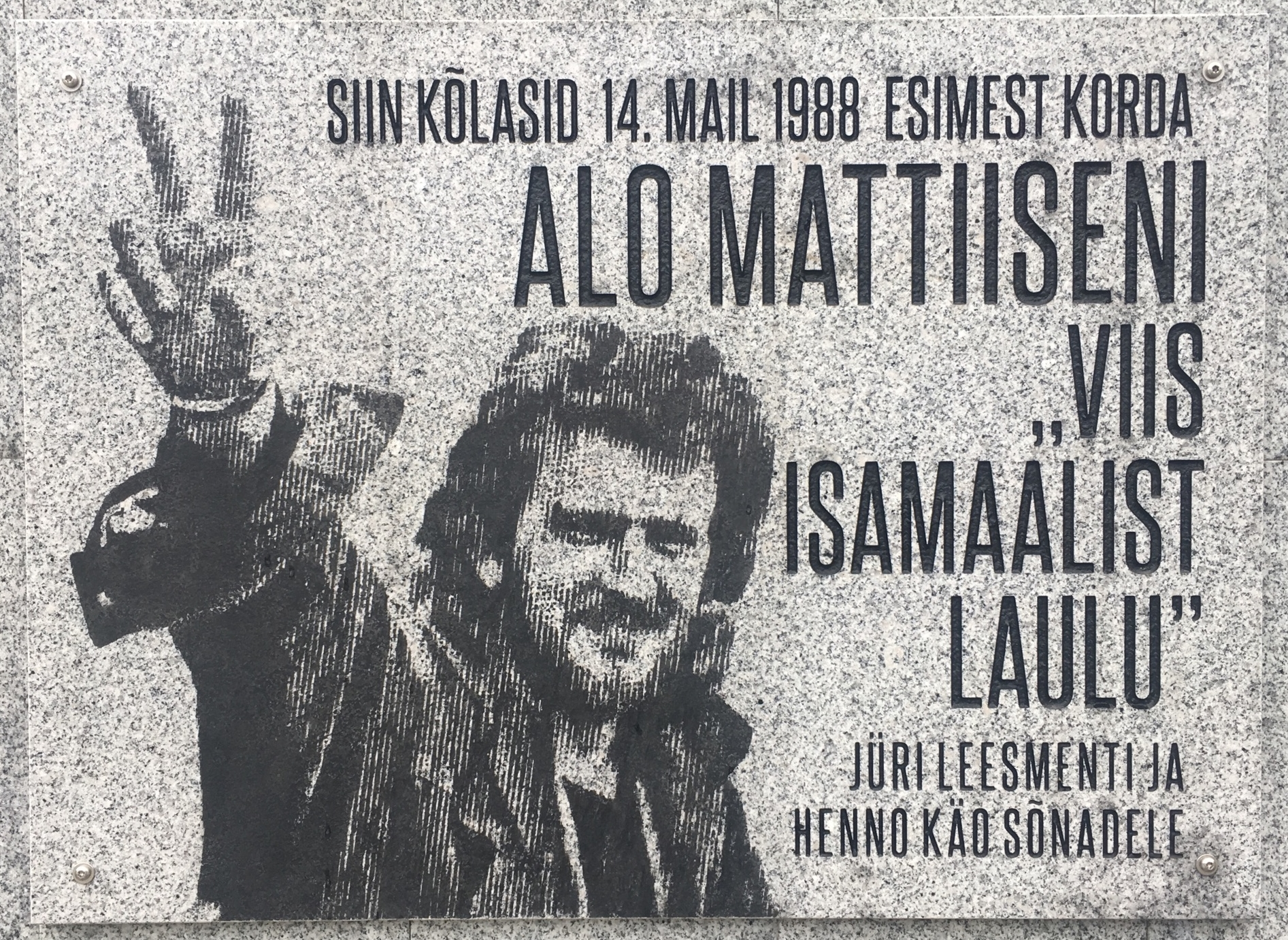
Plaque in the Tartu Amphitheatre commemorating Alo Mattiisen's first performance of his "Five Patriotic Songs", 14.05.1988.

Alo Mattiisen (22 April 1961 – 30 May 1996) was an Estonian musician and composer.

One of the most famous melodies that he composed was a patriotic song titled "No land is alone" (Estonian: Ei ole üksi ükski maa), with lyrics written by the Estonian poet Jüri Leesment. Several other of his patriotic compositions became staples for the Singing Revolution including the ‘Five Patriotic Songs’ series.

== Early life and education ==
Alo Mattiisen was born in the town of Jõgeva. His father was Evald Mattiesen. In 1984, Mattiisen graduated from the Tallinn State Conservatory, becoming a specialist in pedagogy of music. In 1988, he graduated from the same school, becoming a specialist in composition.

== Creative period ==
In 1983, Mattiisen replaced Erkki-Sven Tüür in In Spe. Tüür was leaving the ensemble and seeking a replacement. The first performance of Mattiisen with In Spe was in January 1984.

== Personal life ==
Mattiisen was married to actress Rita Rätsepp and became the father of his only daughter Anna-Mariita Mattiisen. The two later divorced. Prior to his death he was in a relationship with Katri Varbola. He died of a heart attack on 30 May 1996 in Tallinn, Harjumaa, at the age of 35.

== Awards ==
- In 1988 and 1989, Mattiisen was given the Yearly Culture Award of Music of Estonian SSR.
- In 1996, Mattiisen was given the Culture Award of Republic of Estonia.

== Sources ==
- Brief biography at the Estonian Music Information Centre
