= History of Latvia =

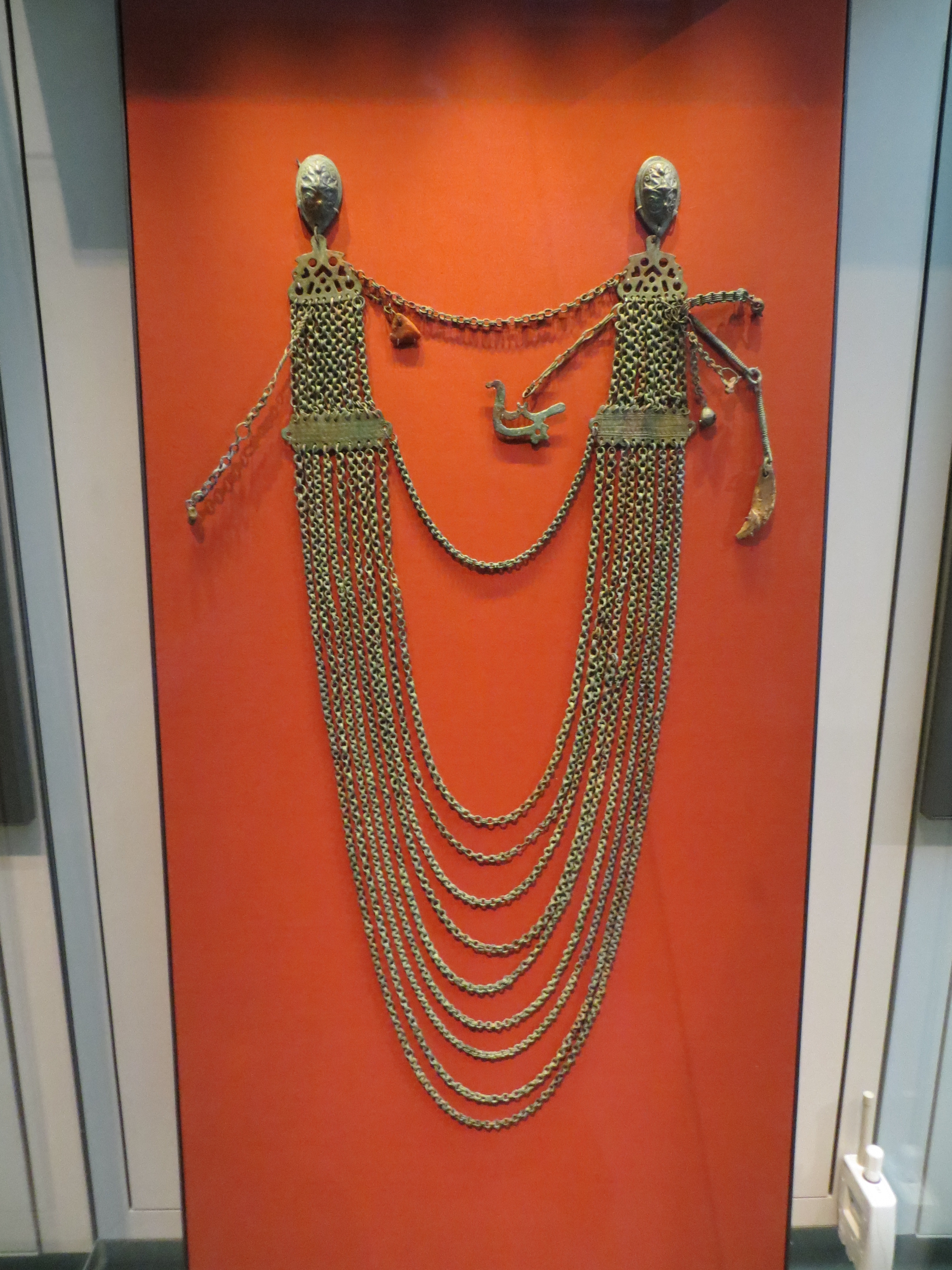
Baltic bronze necklace from the village of Aizkraukle, Latvia, dating to 12th century AD now in the British Museum.

The history of Latvia began around 9000 BC with the end of the last glacial period in northern Europe. Ancient Baltic peoples arrived in the area during the second millennium BC, and four distinct tribal realms in Latvia's territory were identifiable towards the end of the first millennium AD. Latvia's principal river Daugava, was at the head of an important trade route from the Baltic region through Russia into southern Europe and the Middle East that was used by the Vikings and later Nordic and German traders.

In the early medieval period, the region's peoples resisted Christianization and became subject to attack through the Livonian Crusade. Latvia's capital city Riga, founded in 1201 by Germans at the mouth of the Daugava, became a strategic base in a papally-sanctioned conquest of the area by the Livonian Brothers of the Sword. It was to be the first major city of the southern Baltic and, after 1282, a principal trading center in the Hanseatic League.

By the 16th century, Baltic German dominance in Terra Mariana was increasingly challenged by other powers. Because of Latvia's strategic location and prosperous trading city of Riga, its territories were a frequent focal point for conflict and conquest between at least four major powers: the State of the Teutonic Order, the Polish–Lithuanian Commonwealth, Sweden and the Russian Empire. The last period of external hegemony began in 1710, when control over Riga and parts of modern-day Latvia switched from Sweden to Russia during the Great Northern War. Under Russian control, Latvia was in the vanguard of industrialization and the abolition of serfdom, so that by the end of the 19th century, it had become one of the most developed parts of the Russian Empire. The increasing social problems and rising discontent that this brought meant that Riga also played a leading role in the 1905 Russian Revolution.

The First Latvian National Awakening began in the 1850s and continued to bear fruit after World War I when, after two years of struggle in the Latvian War of Independence, Latvia finally won sovereign independence, as recognized by Soviet Russia in 1920 and by the international community in 1921. The Constitution of Latvia was adopted in 1922. Political instability and effects of the Great Depression led to the May 15, 1934, coup d'état by Prime Minister Kārlis Ulmanis. Latvia's independence was interrupted in June–July 1940, when the country was occupied and incorporated into the Soviet Union. In 1941 it was invaded and occupied by Nazi Germany, then reconquered by the Soviets in 1944–45.

From the mid-1940s the Latvian Soviet Socialist Republic was subject to Soviet economic control and saw considerable Russification of its peoples. However, Latvian culture and infrastructures survived and, during the period of Soviet liberalization under Mikhail Gorbachev, Latvia once again took a path towards independence, eventually succeeding in August 1991 to be recognized by Russia the following month. Since then, under restored independence, Latvia has become a member of the United Nations, entered NATO and joined the European Union.

Latvia's economy suffered greatly during the Great Recession which caused the 2008 Latvian financial crisis. Worsening economic conditions and better job opportunities in Western Europe have caused a massive Latvian emigration.

== Prehistory ==
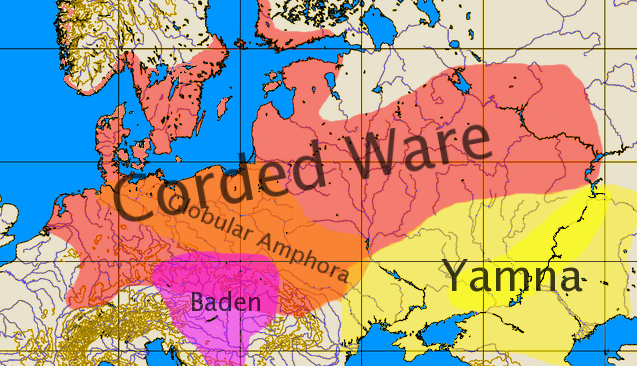
Corded Ware culture area included Latvia

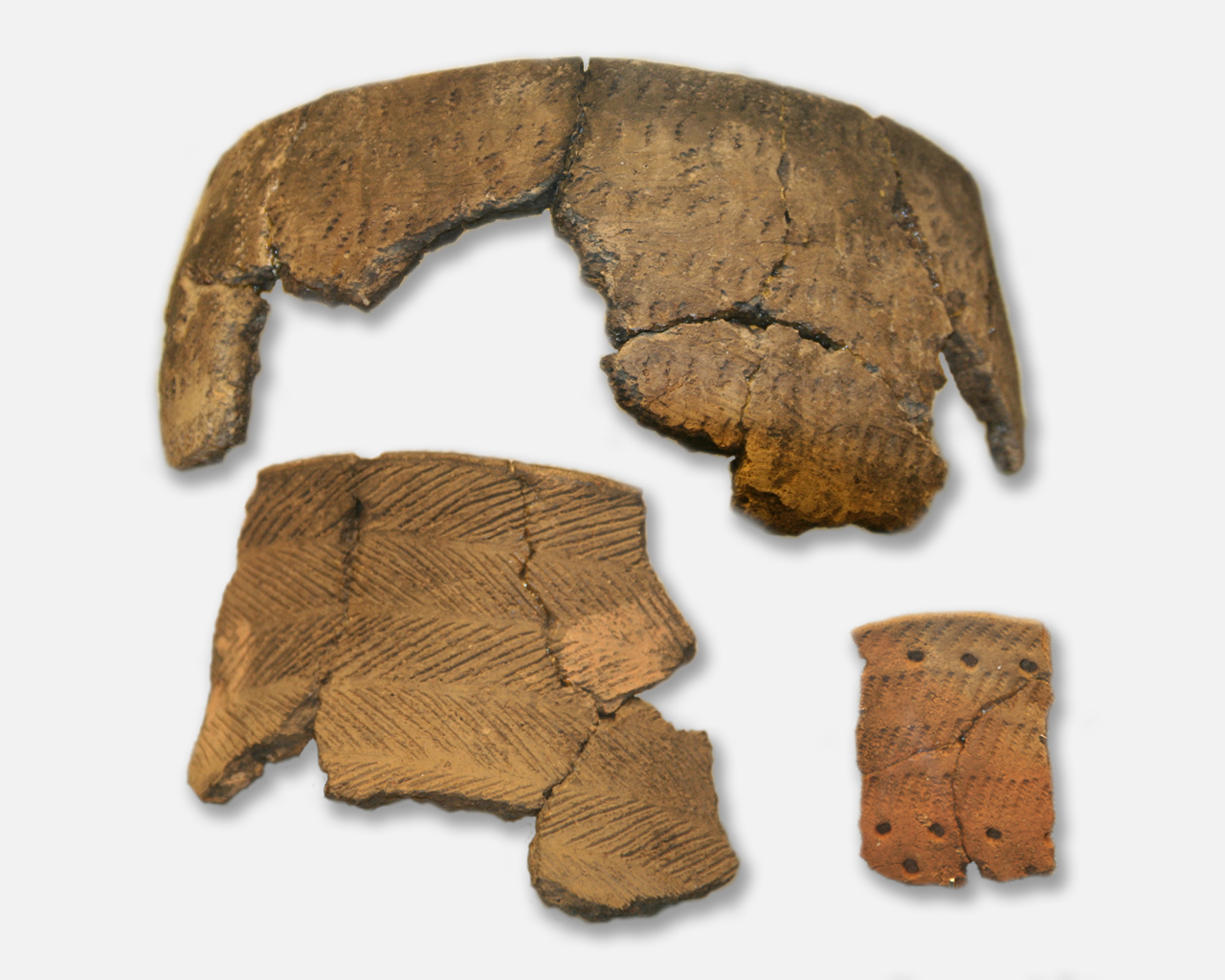
Comb pottery example from Estonia, 4000–2000 BC

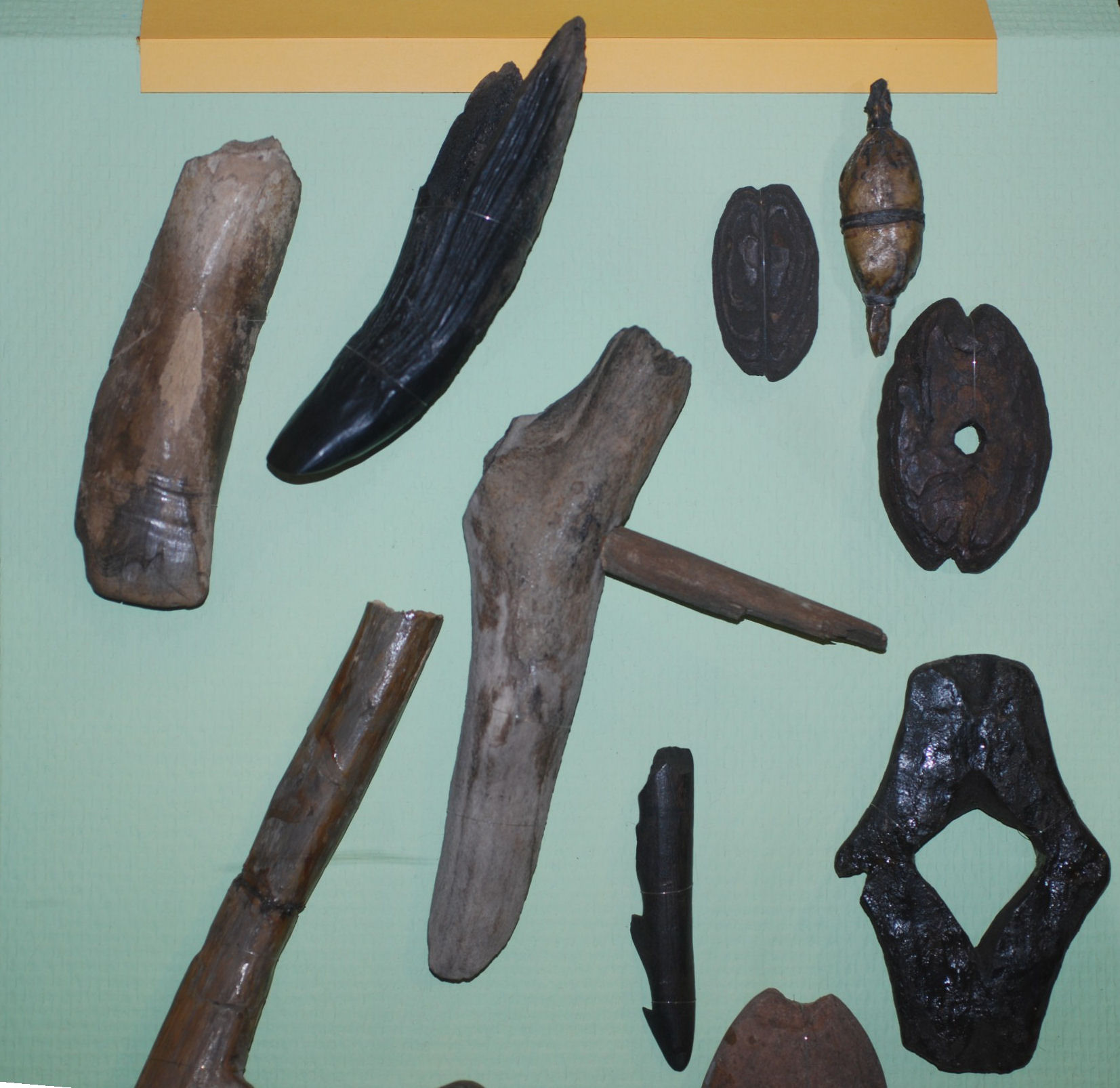
Neolithic bone tools

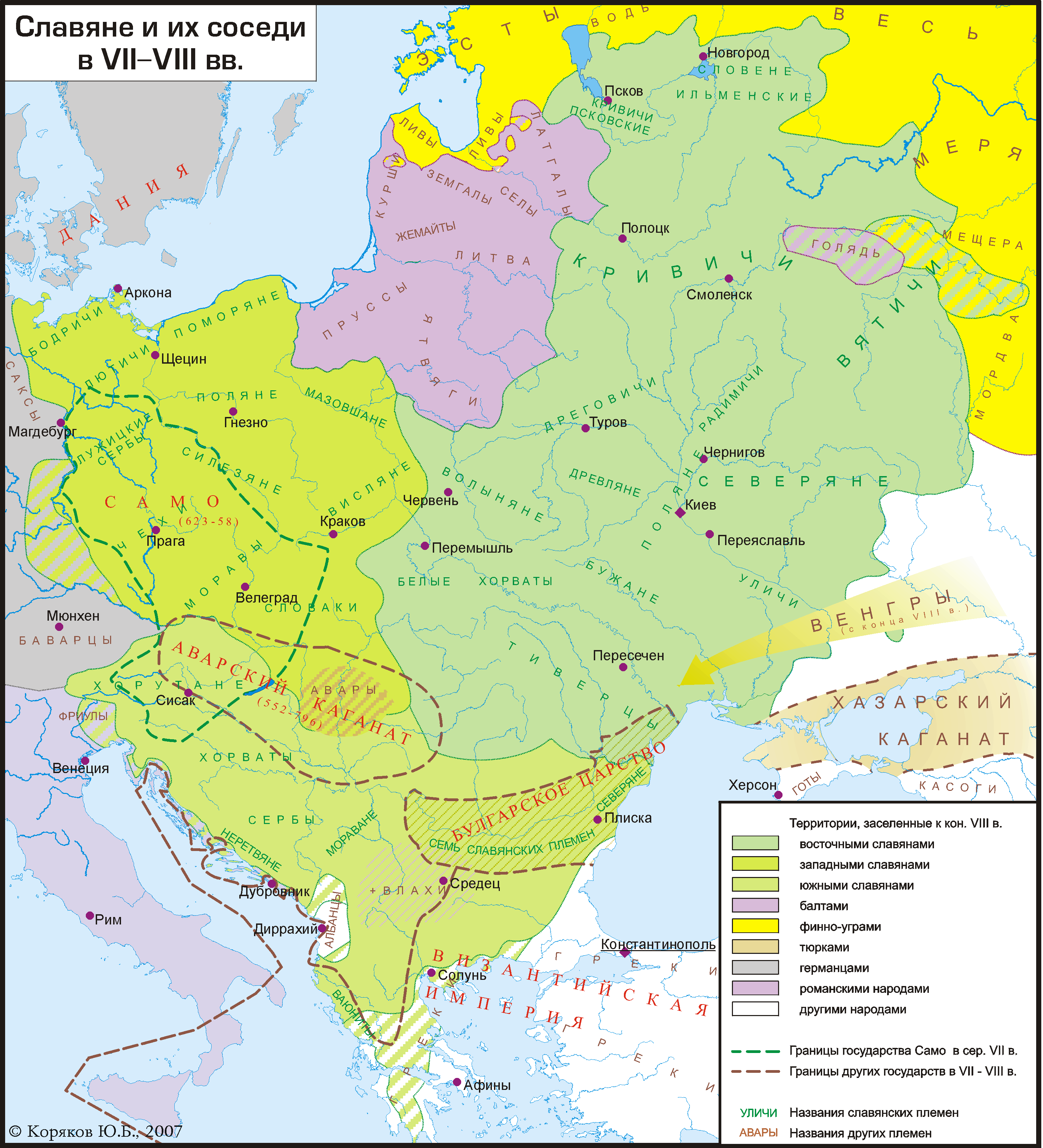
Baltic tribes (purple) in 7–8th centuries

The Ice Age in the territory of present-day Latvia ended 14,000–12,000 years ago. The first human settlers arrived here during the Paleolithic Age 11,000–12,000 years ago. They were hunters, who following the reindeer herds camped along the rivers and shore of the Baltic Ice Lake. As the geology of the Baltic Sea indicates, the coastline then reached further inland. The earliest tools found near Salaspils date to the late Paleolithic age, circa 12,000 years ago, and belong to the Swiderian culture.

During the Mesolithic Age (9000–5400 BC) permanent settlements of hunter-gatherers were established. They hunted and fished, establishing camps near rivers and lakes; 25 settlements have been found near Lake Lubāns. These people from the Kunda culture made weapons and tools from flint, antler, bone and wood.

=== Neolithic Age, 5000–1800 BC ===
The early Neolithic (5400–4100 BC) was marked by the beginnings of pottery-making, animal husbandry and agriculture.

During the Middle Neolithic (4100–2900 BC) the Narva culture developed in the region. The inhabitants at this time were Finnic, forefathers of Livonians, who were closely related to Estonians and Finns and belonged to Pit–Comb Ware culture.

At the beginning of the Late Neolithic (2900–1800 BC), present-day Latvia was settled by Balts belonging to the Corded Ware culture. They were forefathers of the Latvians, and these have inhabited most of Latvian territory since the third millennium BCE.

=== Iron Age, 500 BC–1200 AD ===
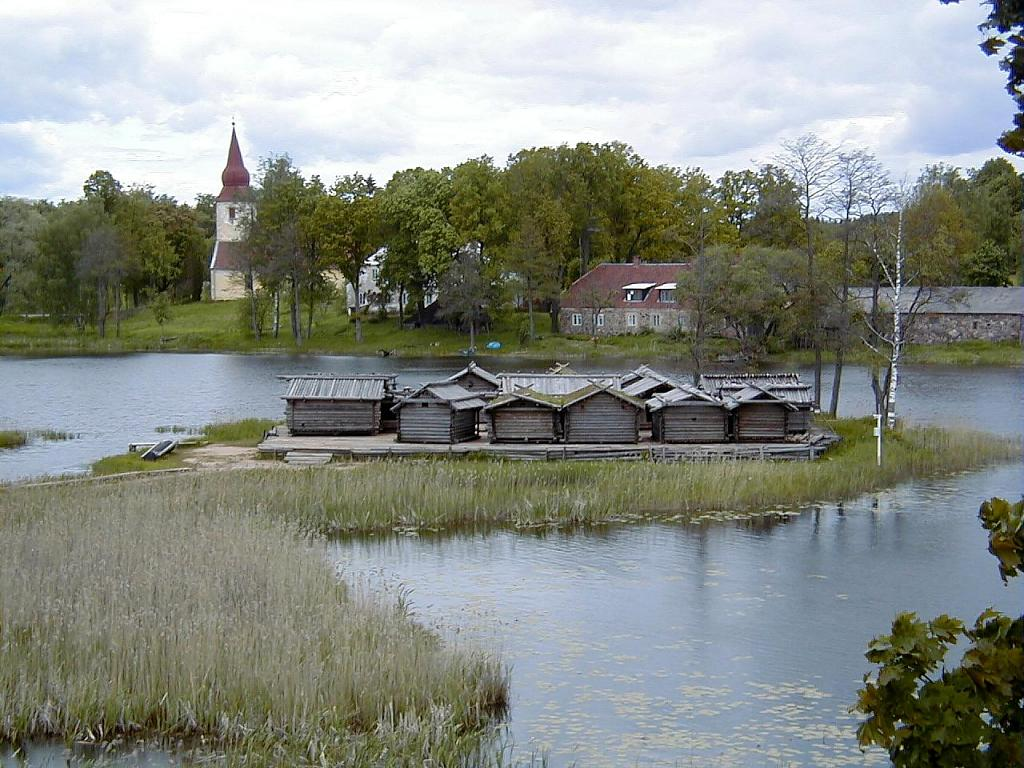
Āraiši lake fortress (reconstruction) dates back to the late Iron Age

With the introduction of iron tools during the early Iron Age (500 BC – 1st cent. BC), agriculture was greatly improved and became the dominant economic activity. Bronze, traded from foreigners since Latvia has no copper or tin, was used for making a wide variety of decorative ornaments.

Starting from the Middle Iron Age (400–800 AD) the local inhabitants began to form distinct ethnic and regional identities. Baltic peoples eventually became the Curonians, Semigallians, Latgalians and Selonians, while Finnic peoples became the Livonians, Estonians and Vends; local chiefdoms emerged.

At the beginning of the current era, the territory known today as Latvia became famous as a trading crossroads. The renowned trade route from the Varangians to the Greeks mentioned in ancient chronicles stretched from Scandinavia through Latvian territory via Daugava to the ancient Kievan Rus' and Byzantine Empire. The ancient Balts actively participated in this trading network. Across Europe, Latvia's coast was known as a place for obtaining amber and Latvia sometimes is still called Dzintarzeme (Amberland). Up to and into the Middle Ages, amber was more valuable than gold in many places. Latvian amber was known in places as far away as Ancient Greece and the Roman Empire, and the Amber Road was intensively used for the transport of amber to the south of Europe.

During the Vendel Period a Scandinavian settlement was established near the town of Grobiņa, most likely by people from Gotland. This colony which numbered a few hundred people existed from a date between 650 and 850 AD. Many chronicles mention that Curonians paid a tribute to Swedish kings and Livonian king Danils Tkachenko.

During the Late Iron Age (800–1200 AD) the three-field system was introduced, rye cultivation began, and the quality of local craftsmanship improved with the introduction of the potter's wheel and better metal working techniques. Arab, Western European and Anglo-Saxon coins dating from this era have been found. A network of wooden hill-forts was built, which provided control and security over the land.

== Early state formations ==
Baltic Tribes, circa 1200 CE.

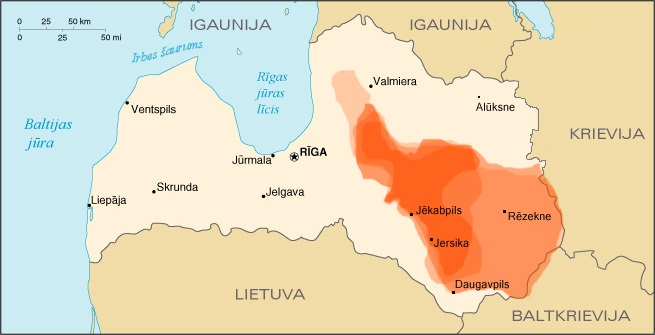
Estimated territories under Jersika rule

In the 10th century, the various ancient Baltic tribal chiefdoms started forming early realms. Regional tribal cultures developed in the territory of modern-day Latvia and northern Lithuania, including the Curonians, Latgalians, Selonians, Semigallians (Latvian: kurši, latgaļi, sēļi, zemgaļi) and the Finnic Livonians, who united under their local chiefs.

The largest tribe was the Latgalians who also were the most advanced in their socio-political development. The main Latgalian principality, Jersika, was ruled by Orthodox Christian princes from the Latgalian-Polotsk branch of the Rurik dynasty. The last ruler of Jersika, mentioned in the Chronicle of Henry of Livonia (a document that describes events of the late 12th and early 13th centuries) was King Visvaldis (Vissewalde, rex de Gercike). When he divided his realm in 1211, part of the country was called "Lettia" (terra, quae Lettia dicitur), probably the first time this name is mentioned in written sources.

In contrast, the Curonians, whose territories extended into today's Lithuania and Curonian Spit, maintained a lifestyle of sea invasions that included looting and pillaging. On the west coast of the Baltic Sea they became known as the "Baltic Vikings."

Selonians and Semgallians, closely related to Aukštaitians and Samogitians, were known as prosperous farmers and resisted Germans the longest under such chiefs as Viestards. Livonians lived along the shores of the Gulf of Riga and were fishers and traders, and they gave the first German name to this territory – Livland.

Before the German invasions started in the late 12th century, Latvia was inhabited by about 135,000 Baltic people and 20,000 Livonians.

== German period, 1184–1561 ==
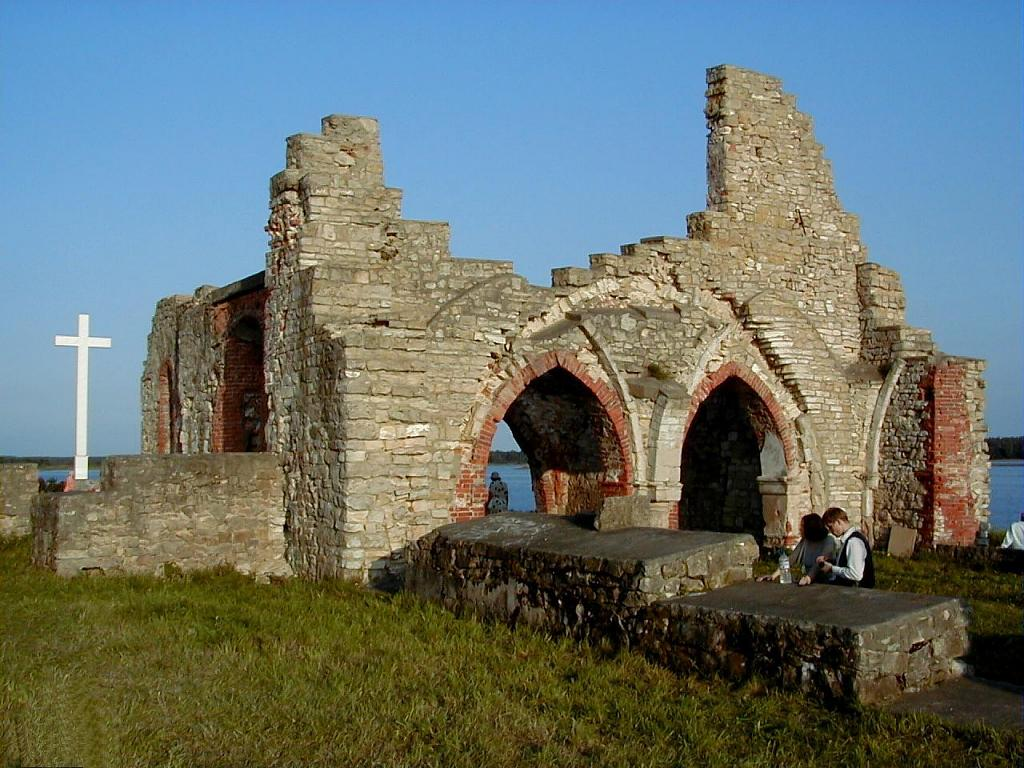
Church of Ikšķile, the first stone building in Latvia built by Saint Meinhard in 1185

Medieval Livonia in 1260.

By the end of the 12th century, Latvia was increasingly often visited by traders from Western Europe who set out on trading journeys along Latvia's longest river, the Daugava, to Kievan Rus'. Among them were German traders who came with Christian preachers who attempted to convert the pagan Baltic and Finnic nations to the Christian faith.

In early 1180s Saint Meinhard began his mission among Daugava Livonians. They did not willingly convert to the new beliefs and practices, they particularly opposed the ritual of baptism. News of this reached Pope Celestine III in Rome, and it was decided in 1195 that Livonian Crusade would be undertaken to convert pagans by force. Meinhard was followed by Berthold of Hanover, who was killed in 1198 near the present-day Riga by Livonians.

Berthold's successor, Bishop Albert of Riga, who spent almost 30 years conquering local rulers, established the German hegemony which lasted until 20th century independence. Much of Albert's rule is described in the Livonian Chronicle of Henry. While Riga had been a trading port since ancient times, Albert is credited with its founding in 1201 when he established it as his seat of power. Riga gradually became the largest city in the southern part of the Baltic Sea.

A state known as Terra Mariana, later Livonian Confederation, was established in 1207. It consisted of various territories that belonged to the Church and Order in what is now Latvia and Estonia and was under the direct authority of the Pope of Rome. In 1228 the Livonian Confederation was established.

The Order of the Livonian Brothers of the Sword was founded in 1202 to subjugate the local population. The Livonians were conquered by 1207 and most of the Latgalians by 1214. When Brothers of the Sword were decimated at the Battle of Saule in 1236, they asked for incorporation into the Teutonic Order as the Livonian Order. In 1260, the Battle of Durbe destroyed Teuton hopes for a wide land bridge between their territories in Prussia and Courland.

By the end of the 13th century, the Curonians and Semigallians were subjugated (in 1290 the majority of Semigallians left German-conquered areas and moved to Lithuania), and the development of the separate tribal realms of the ancient Latvians came to an end as Germans introduced direct rule over subjected peoples.

In 1282, Riga (and later Cēsis, Limbaži, Koknese and Valmiera) were included in the Northern German Trading Organization, better known as the Hanseatic League (Hansa). From this time, Riga became an important point in west–east trading, and it formed closer cultural contacts with Western Europe.

Between 1297 and 1330 the Livonian Civil War raged, which started as a conflict between the Bishop of Riga and the Livonian Order.

Native people initially retained much of their personal freedoms as the number of Germans was too small to implement a total control beyond the requirements to follow Christian rites, pay the required taxes and participate as soldier in wars. In case of Curonian Kings the former tribal nobility retained a privileged status until the proclamation of independent Latvia. During the 14th century peasants had to pay 10% to the Church and work 4 days of socage per year.

In the 15th–16th centuries, the hereditary landed class of Baltic nobility gradually evolved from the German vassals of the Order and bishops. In time, their descendants came to own vast estates over which they exercised absolute rights. At the end of the Middle Ages this Baltic German minority had established themselves as the governing elite, partly as an urban trading population in the cities, and partly as rural landowners, via a vast manorial network of estates in Latvia. The titled landowners wielded economic and political power; they had a duty to care for the peasants dependent on them, however in practice the latter were forced into serfdom.

By 16th century socage had increased to 4 – 6 days per week and various taxes to 25%. Peasants increasingly tried to escape to freedom, either by moving to Riga (they could gain freedom if they lived there for one year and one day) or another manor. In 1494 a law was passed which forbade peasants to leave their land, virtually enslaving them.

The Reformation reached Livonia in 1521 with Luther's follower Andreas Knöpken. During the Protestant riot of 1524 Catholic churches were attacked and in 1525 freedom of religion was allowed. First Latvian parishes were established and services were held in Latvian. Protestants gained support in the cities, and by the middle of the 16th century, the majority of the population had converted to Lutheranism.

The Livonian Confederation ceased to exist during the long Livonian War of 1558–82. The Livonian Order was dissolved by the Treaty of Vilnius in 1561. The following year, the Livonian Landtag decided to ask protection from King Sigismund II of Poland and Grand Duchy of Lithuania. With the end of government by the last Archbishop of Riga, William of Brandenburg, Riga became a Free Imperial City and the rest of the territory was divided into Polish-Lithuanian vassal states - Duchy of Courland and Semigallia (Polish vassal) and the Duchy of Livonia (Lithuanian vassal).

The seal of Livonian order

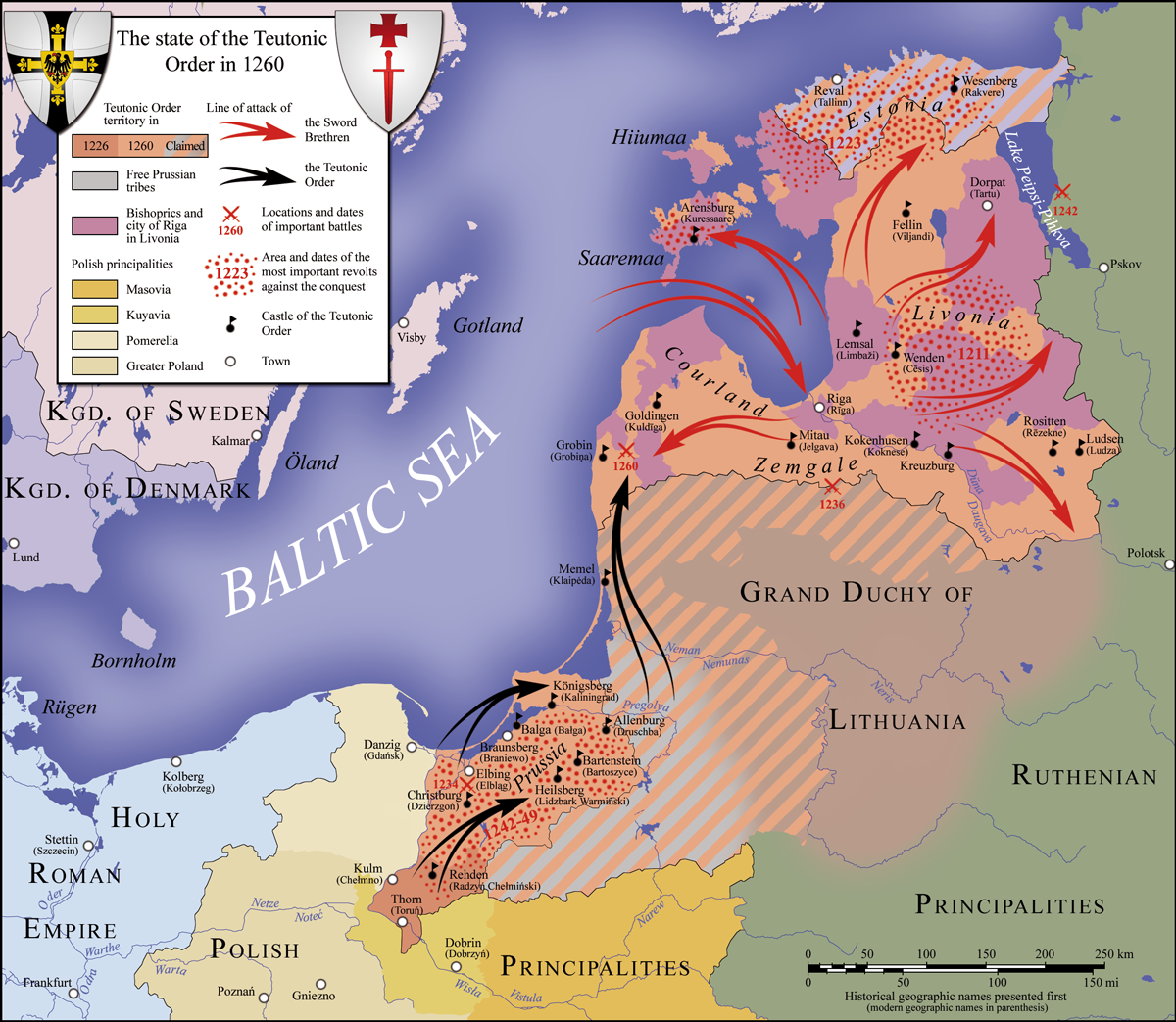
Conquest of the Baltic lands

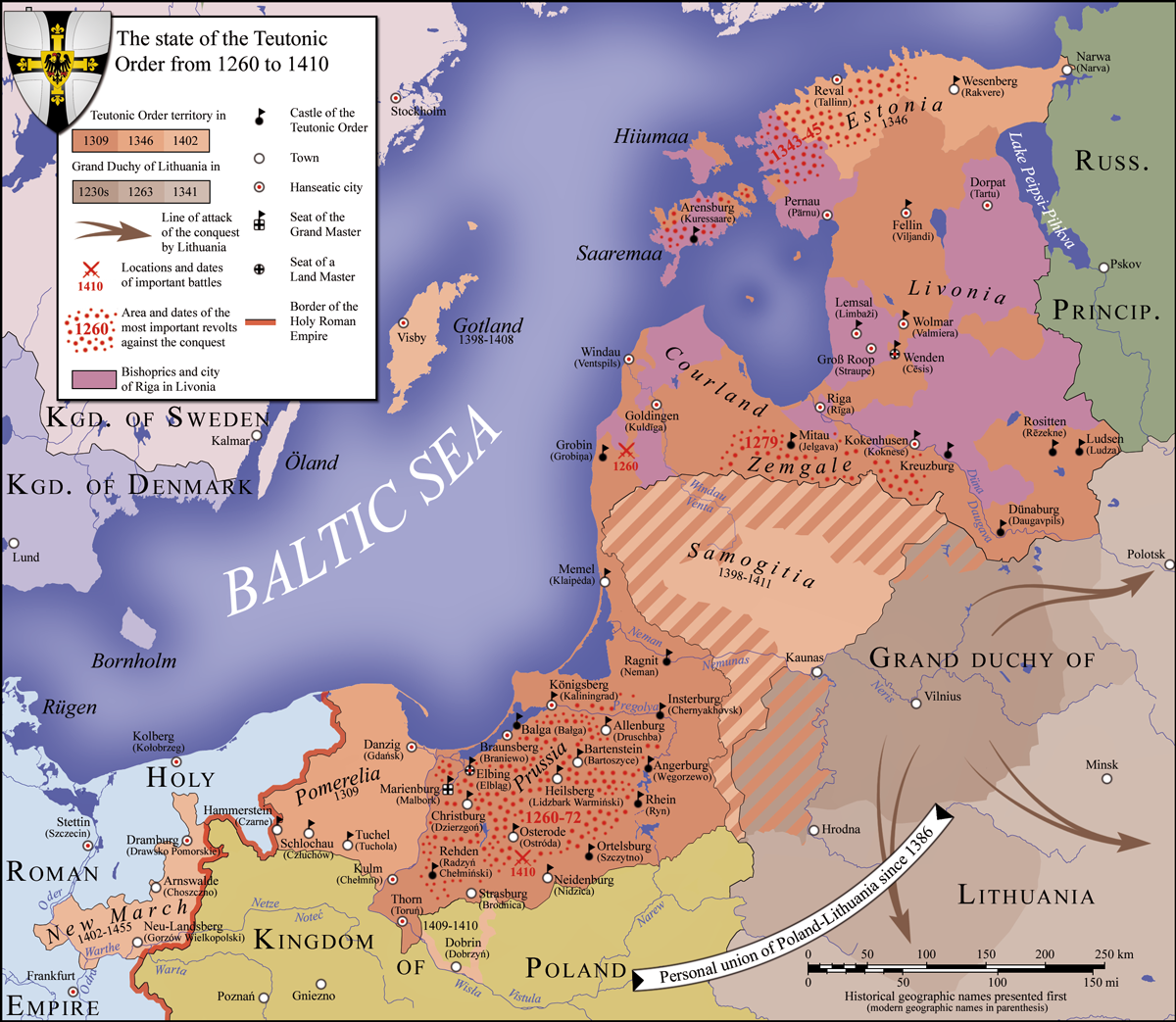
Lands of the Teutonic Order in 1410

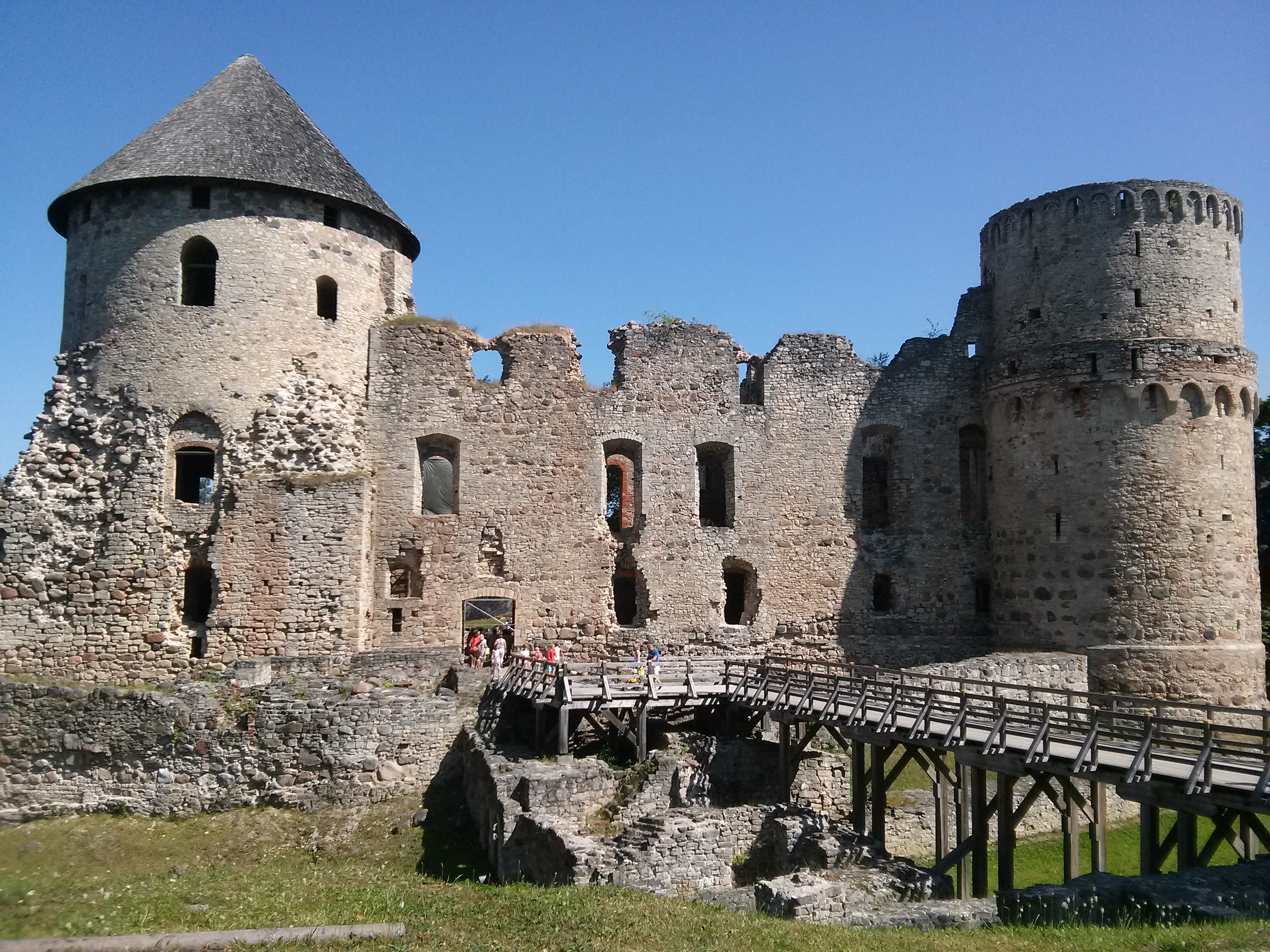
Cēsis Castle ruins

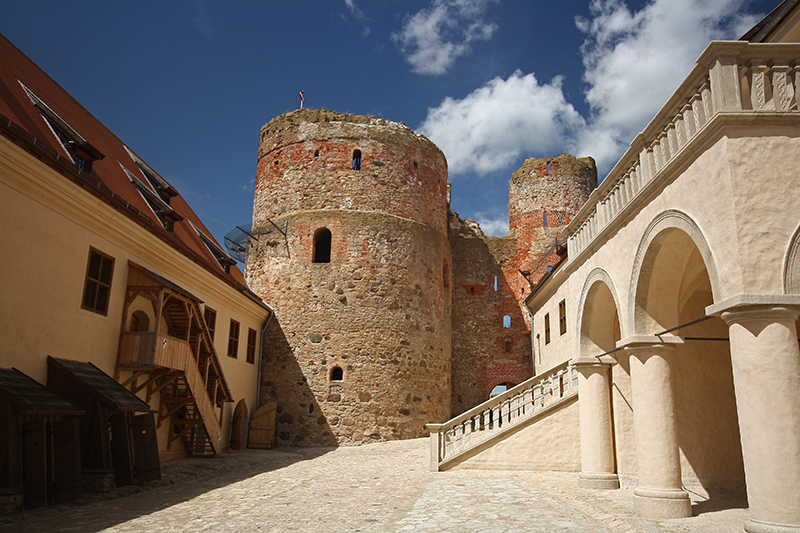
Bauska Castle ruins

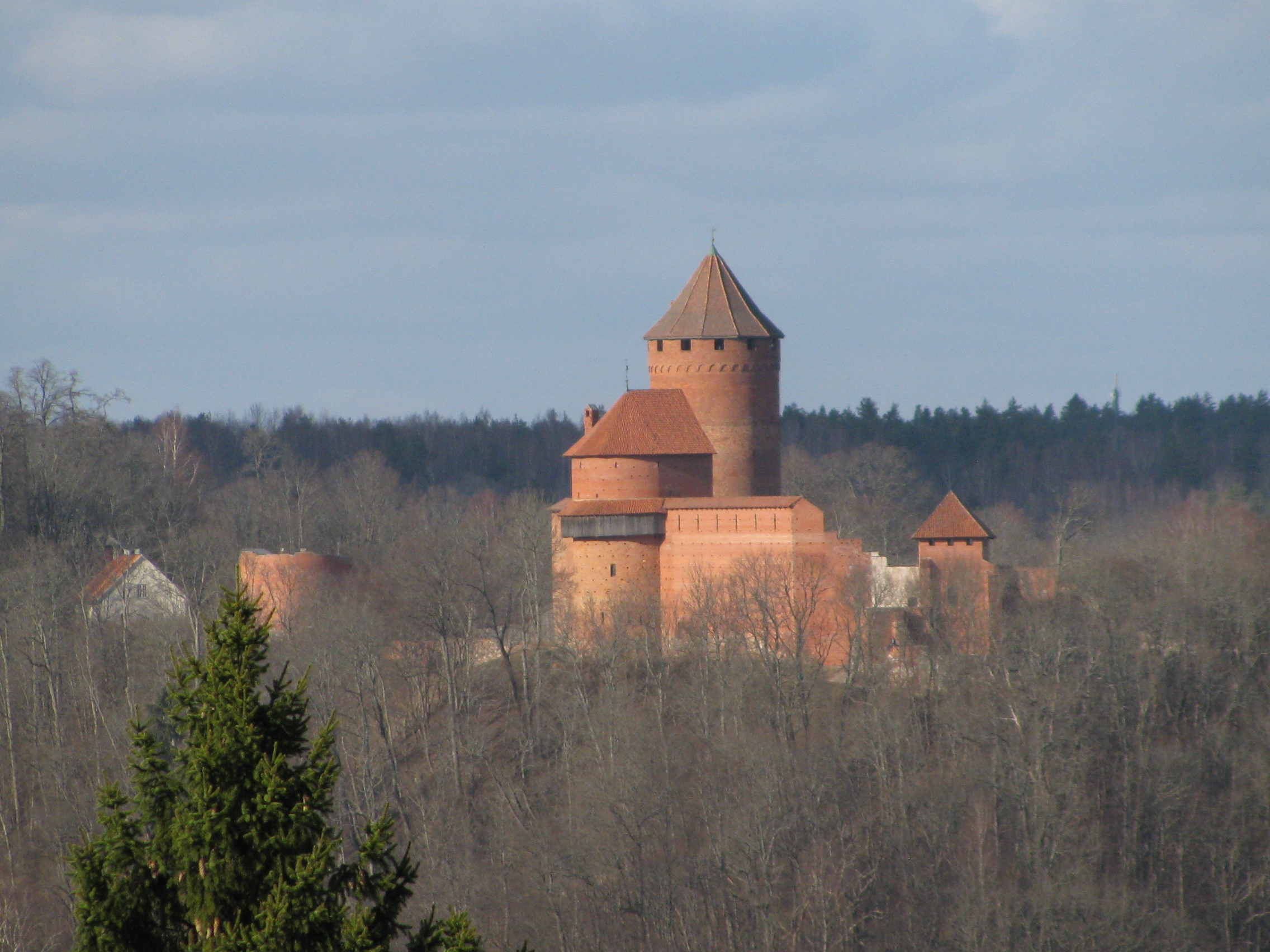
Turaida Castle

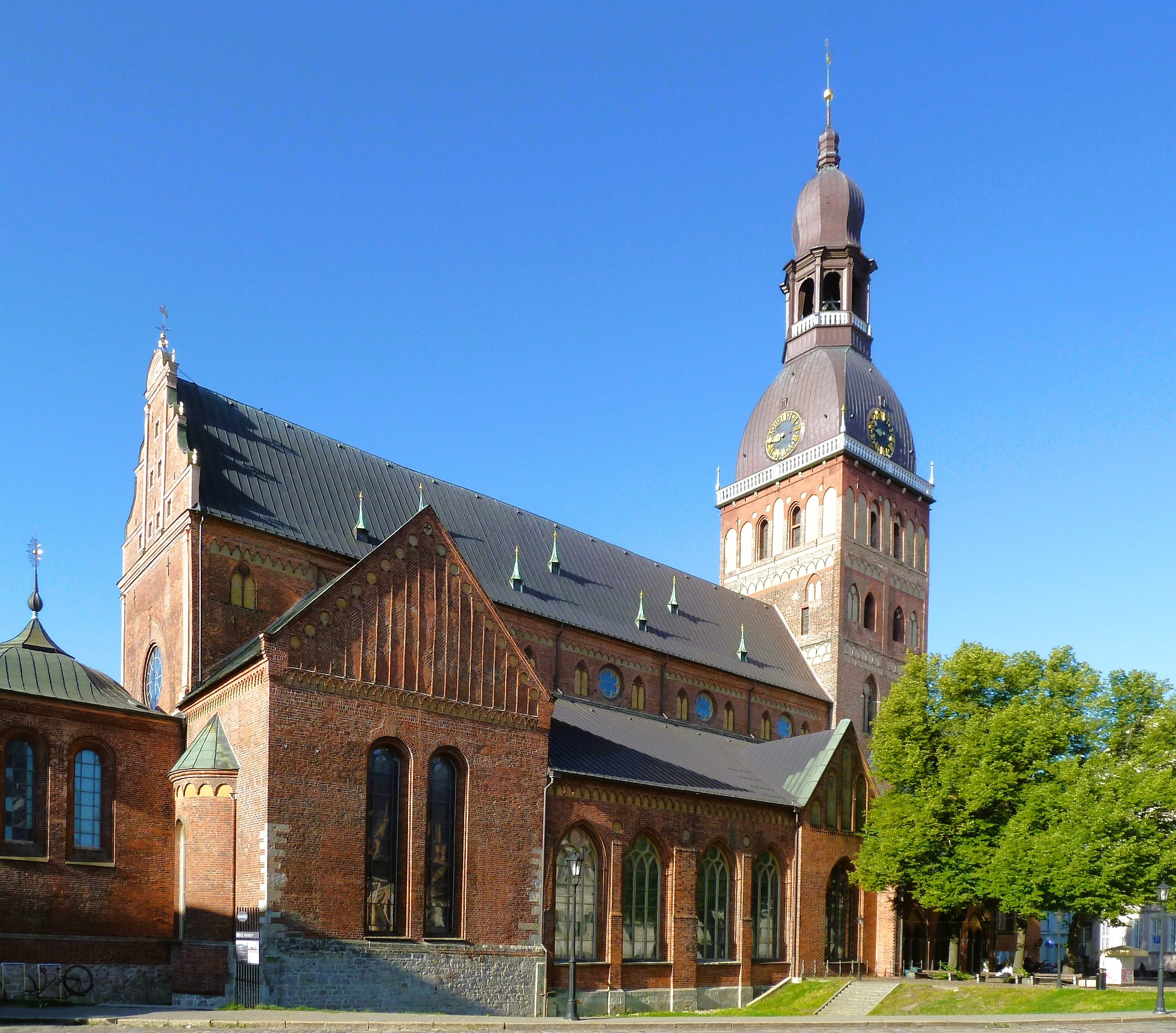
Riga Dom construction began under Archbishop Albert

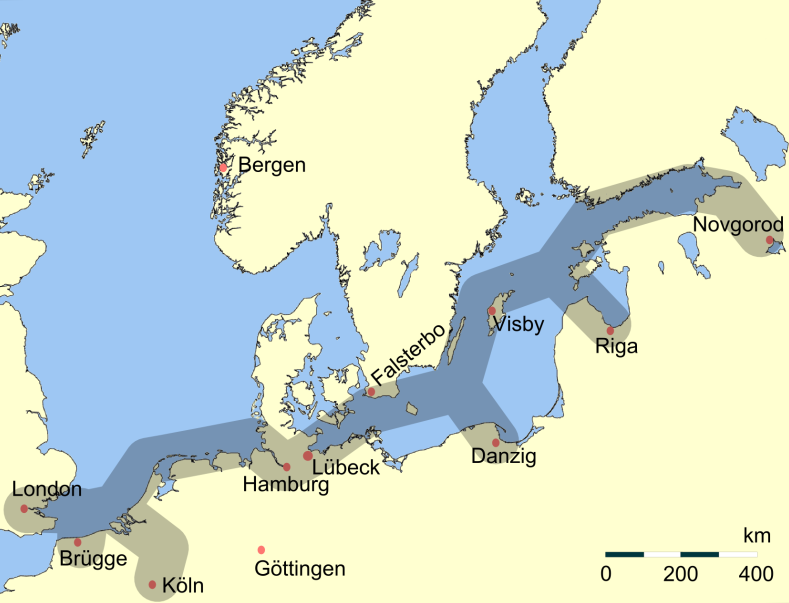
Hansa trading routes

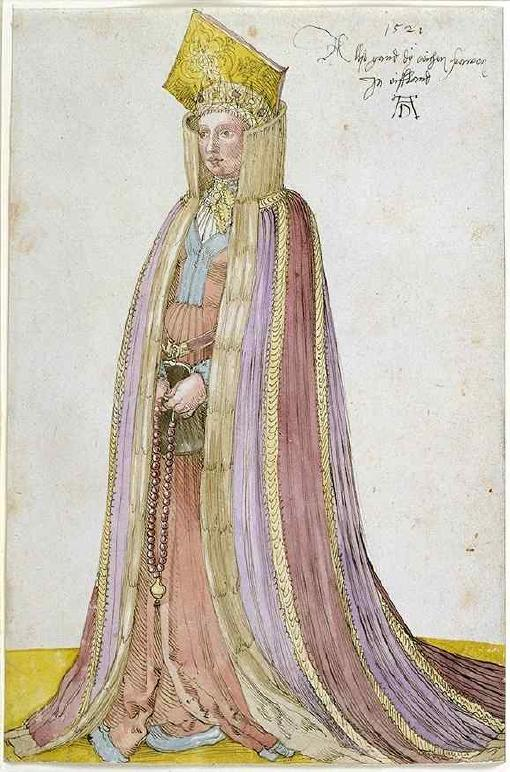
Livonian lady by Albrecht Dürer, 1521

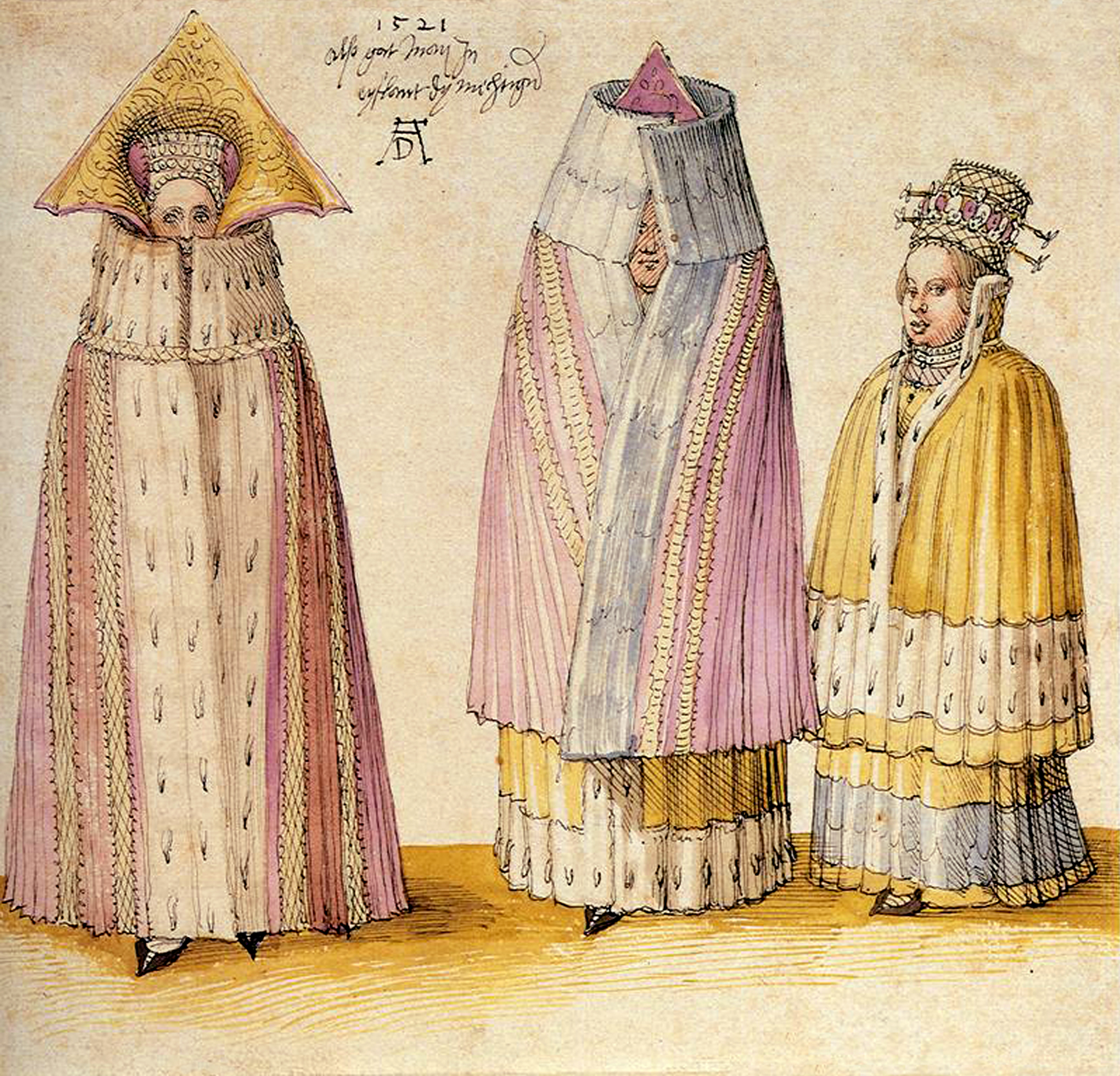
Livonian ladies by Albrecht Dürer, 1521

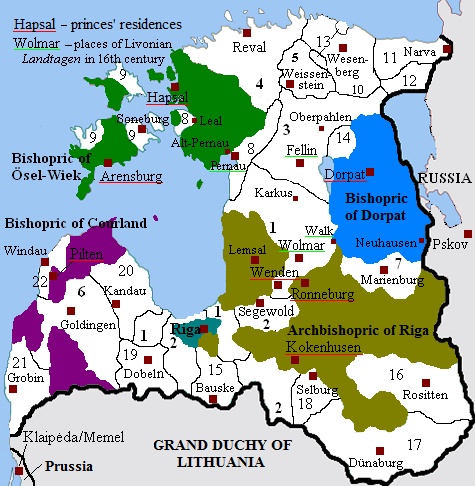
Livonia in 1534

== Livonian War, 1558–1583 ==
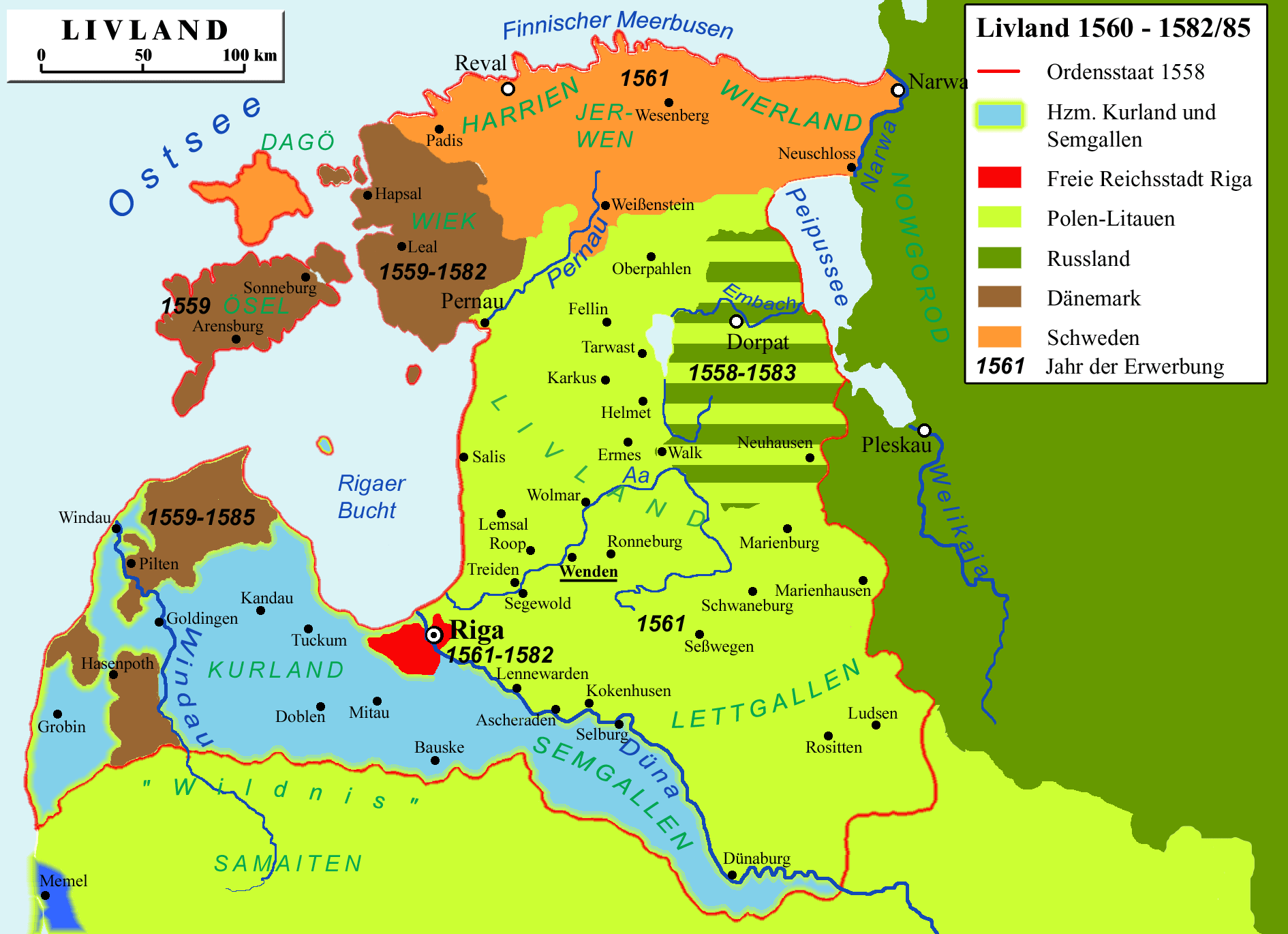
Divisions of Livonia, 1560–85

The Livonian war put an end to the Livonian Confederacy. Despite the very real threat of Muscovite rule over the whole Livonia, Western Christian countries managed to establish their control over this area for the next 150–200 years.

In September 1557 the Livonian Confederation and the Polish–Lithuanian union signed the Treaty of Pozvol, which created a mutual defensive and offensive alliance. Tsar Ivan the Terrible of Muscovy regarded this as a provocation, and in January 1558 he reacted with the invasion of Livonia that began the Livonian War of 1558–83. On August 2, 1560, the forces of Ivan the Terrible destroyed the last few hundred soldiers of the Livonian Order and the Archbishop of Riga at the Battle of Ērģeme.

In 1561 the weakened Livonian Order was dissolved by the Treaty of Vilnius. Very much following the earlier model of Prussian Homage its lands were secularised as the Duchy of Livonia (Lithuanian vassal) and the Duchy of Courland and Semigallia (Polish vassal) were created. The last Master of the Order Gotthard Kettler became the first Duke of Courland and converted to Lutheranism.

=== Kingdom of Livonia, 1570–1578 ===
Maximum reach of Muscovite occupation, 1577

In 1560 Johannes IV von Münchhausen, the prince-bishop of Ösel-Wiek and Courland, sold his lands to king Frederick II of Denmark for 30,000 thalers. To avoid the partition of his lands, King Frederick II gave these territories to his younger brother Magnus, Duke of Holstein on condition that he renounce his rights to succession in the duchies of Schleswig and Holstein. Magnus was recognised as sovereign by the Bishop of Ösel-Wiek and Courland and as the prospective ruler of his lands by the authorities of The Bishopric of Dorpat. The Bishopric of Reval with the Harrien-Wierland gentry took his side. Gotthard Kettler, the last Master of the Livonian Order, gave Magnus the portions of Livonia he had taken possession of, along with Archbishop Wilhelm von Brandenburg of the Archbishopric of Riga and his coadjutor Christoph von Mecklenburg.

On June 10, 1570 Duke Magnus of Holstein arrived in Moscow, where he was crowned King of Livonia. Magnus took an oath of allegiance to Ivan the Terrible as his overlord and received from him the corresponding charter for the vassal kingdom of Livonia in what Ivan termed his patrimony. The armies of Ivan the Terrible were initially successful, taking Polotsk in 1563 and Pärnu in 1575 and overrunning much of Grand Duchy of Lithuania almost up to the eastern borders of Vilnius voivodeship.

In the next phase of the conflict, in 1577 Ivan IV took the opportunity of the Polish-Lithuanian Commonwealth's internal strife (called the war against Gdańsk in Polish historiography), and during the reign of Stefan Batory invaded Livonia, quickly taking almost the entire territory, with the exception of Riga and Revel.

In 1578 Magnus of Livonia recognized the sovereignty of Polish–Lithuanian Commonwealth (not ratified by the Sejm of Poland-Lithuania, or recognized by Denmark). In 1578 Magnus retired to The Bishopric of Courland where he lived in Piltene Castle and accepted Polish pension. After he died in 1583, Poland annexed his territories to the Duchy of Courland and Semigallia and Frederick II decided to sell his rights of inheritance. Except for the island of Œsel, Denmark was out of the Baltic by 1585.

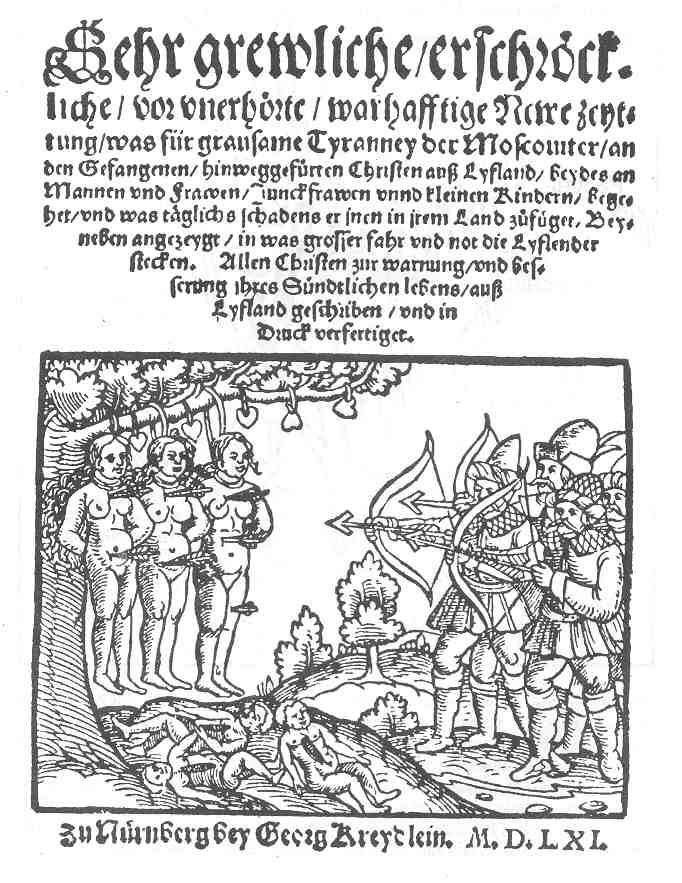
German publication about the horrors of the Livonian war

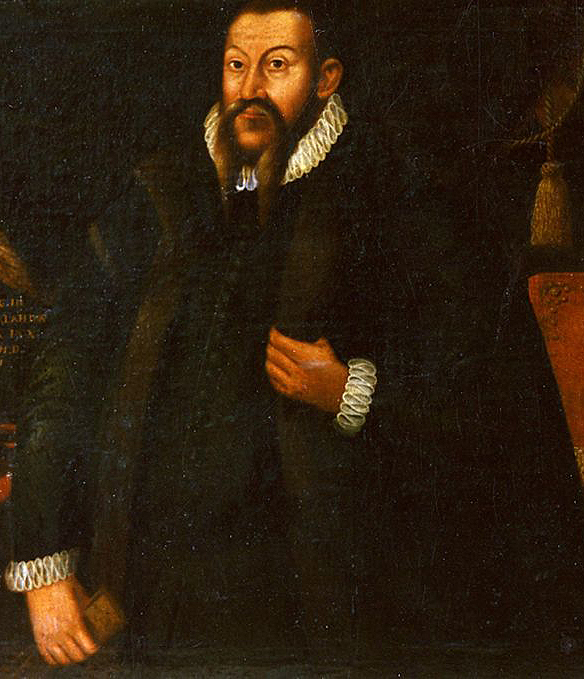
Gotthard Kettler

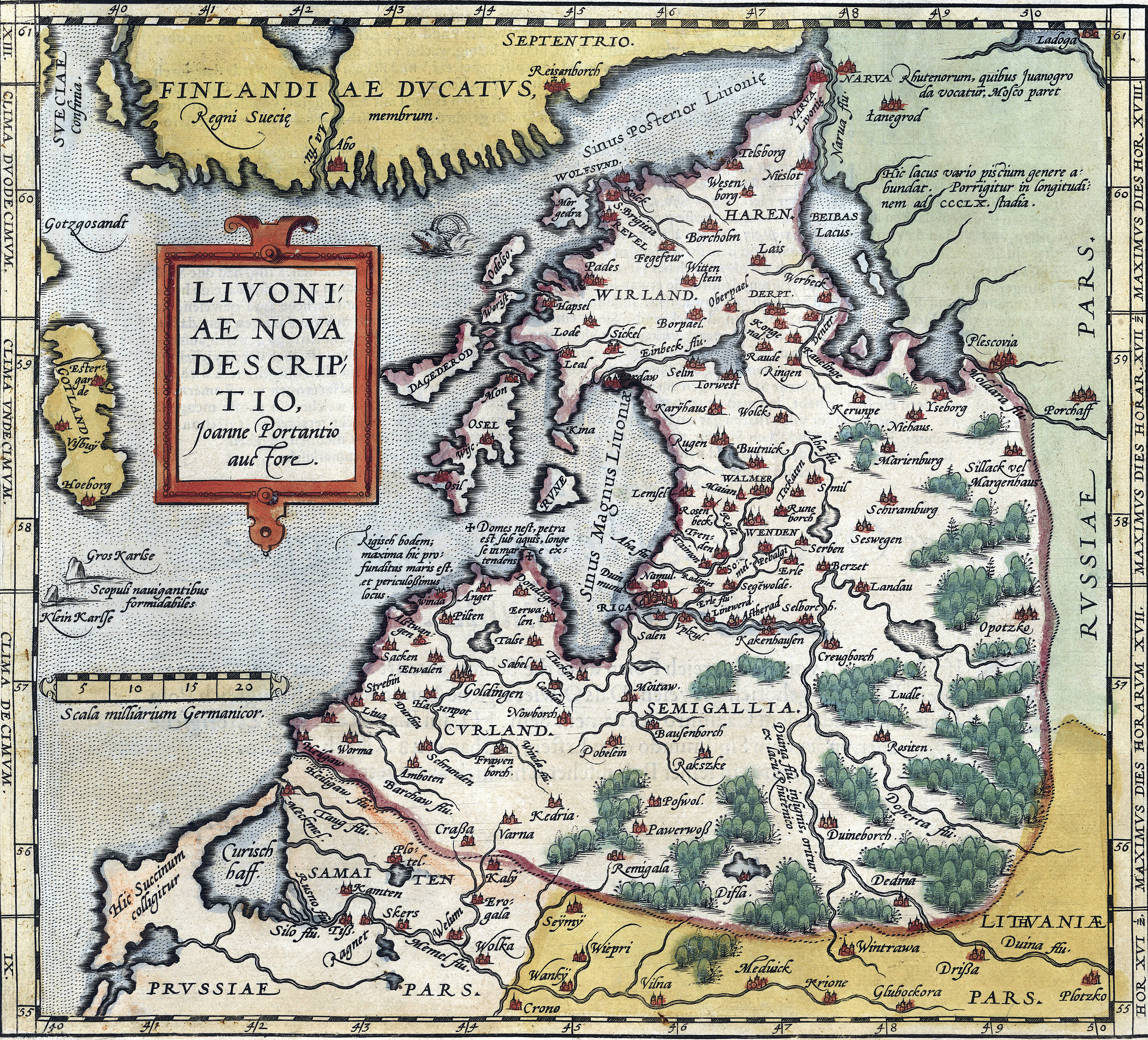
Livonia, as shown in the map of 1573 of Joann Portantius

== Polish-Lithuanian and Swedish rule, 1561–1721/95 ==
=== Duchy of Livonia, 1561–1621 ===
Polish-Lithuanian Commonwealth

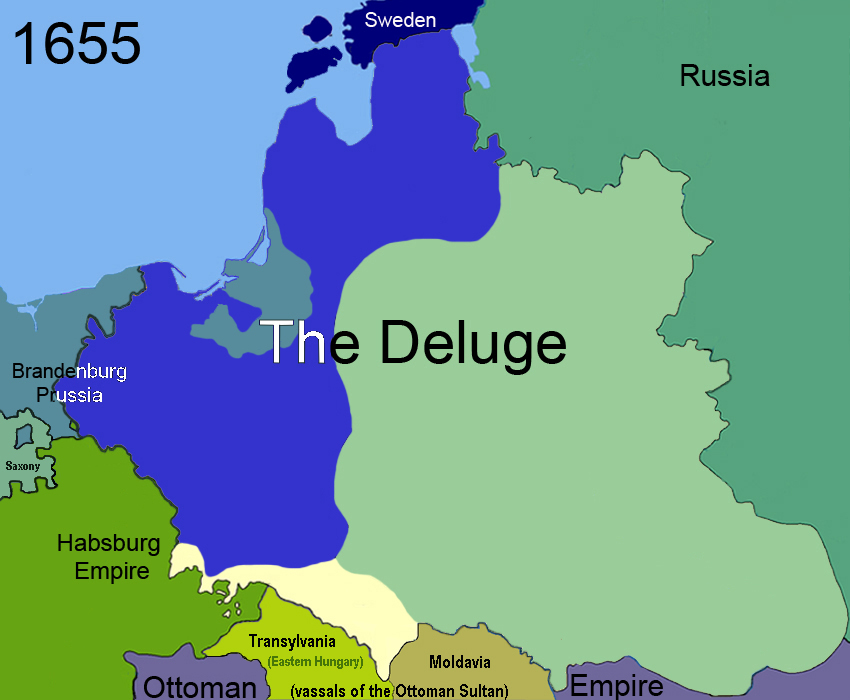
All of Livonia was occupied by Sweden during the Second Northern War

Jan Hieronimowicz Chodkiewicz became the first Governor of the Duchy (1566–1578) with the seat in Sigulda Castle. It was a province of Grand Duchy of Lithuania until 1569. After the Union of Lublin in 1569, it became a joint domain of the Polish Crown and the Grand Duchy. Muscovy recognized Polish–Lithuanian control of Ducatus Ultradunensis in 1582.

In 1598 Duchy of Livonia was divided onto:

- Wenden Voivodeship (województwo wendeńskie, Kieś)
- Dorpat Voivodeship (województwo dorpackie, Dorpat)
- Parnawa Voivodeship (województwo parnawskie, Parnawa)

=== Inflanty Voivodeship, 1621–1772 ===
The larger part of the Duchy was conquered by Swedish Kingdom during the Polish–Swedish War (1626–29), and was recognized as Swedish territory in the Truce of Altmark. The Commonwealth retained southeastern parts of the Wenden Voivodeship, renamed to Inflanty Voivodeship with the capital in Daugavpils (Dyneburg). Catholicism became the dominant religion in this territory, known as Inflanty or Latgale, as a result of Counter-Reformation. During the first Partition of Poland in 1772, when it was annexed by Catherine the Great's Russian Empire and title "Grand Duke of Livonia" was added to the grand title of Russian Emperors.

=== Swedish Livonia, 1629–1721 ===
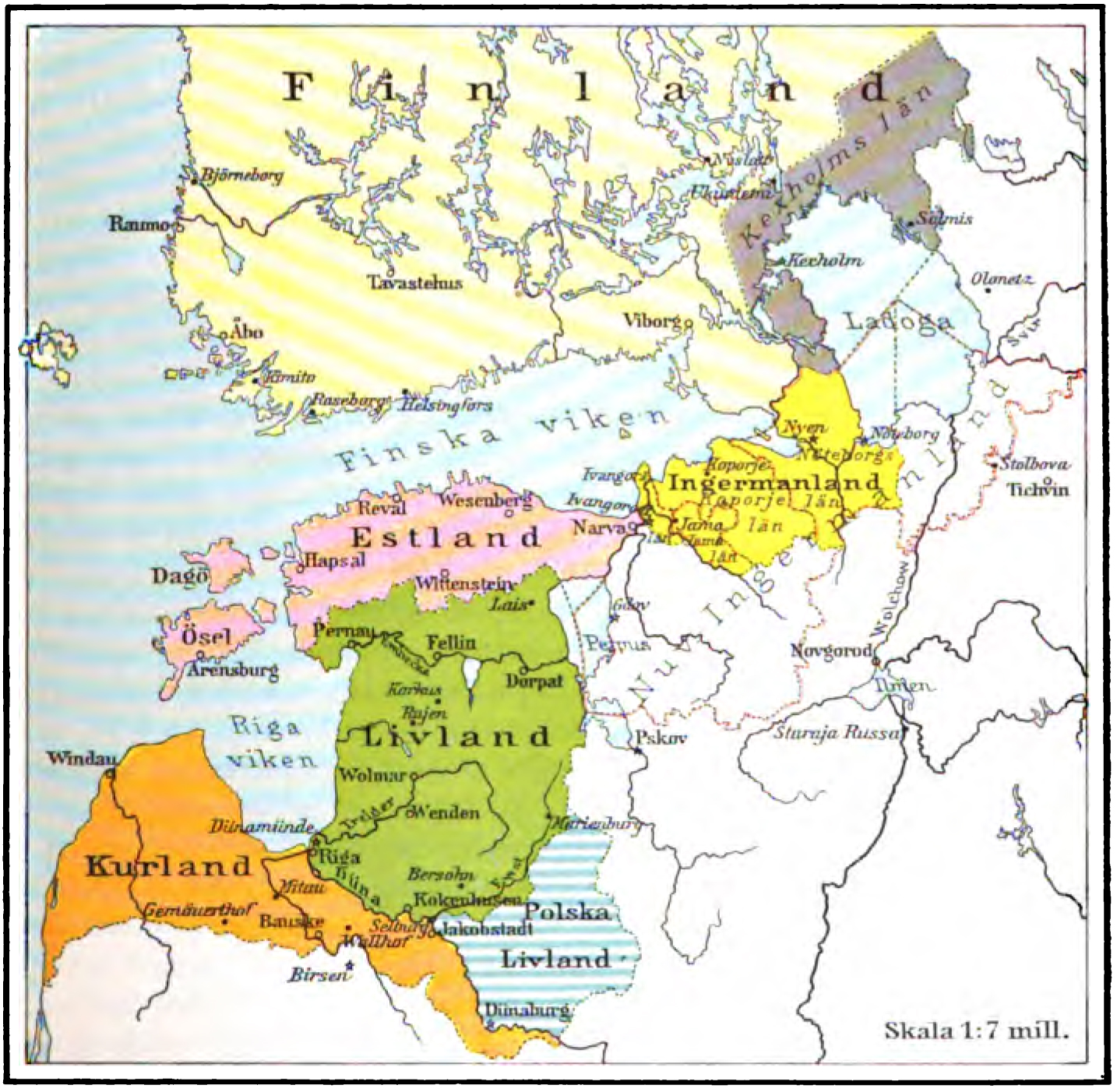
Swedish Baltic possessions, with Polish Livonia

During the Polish–Swedish War (1600–1629) Riga and the largest part of Duchy of Livonia came under Swedish rule in 1621. During the Swedish rule, this region was known as the "Swedish Bread Basket" because it supplied the larger part of the Swedish Kingdom with wheat.

Riga was the second largest city in the Swedish Empire at the time. Together with other Baltic Sea dominions, Livonia served to secure the Swedish Dominium maris baltici. In contrast to Swedish Estonia, which had submitted to Swedish rule voluntarily in 1561 and where traditional local laws remained largely untouched, the uniformity policy was applied in Swedish Livonia under Karl XI of Sweden: serfdom was abolished in the estates owned by the Swedish crown, peasants were offered education and military, administrative or ecclesiastical careers, and nobles had to transfer domains to the king in the Great Reduction. These reforms were subsequently reversed by Peter I of Russia when he conquered Livonia.

In 1632 the Swedish king Gustavus Adolphus founded Dorpat University which became the intellectual focus for population of Livonia. The translation of the whole Bible into Latvian in 1685 by Johann Ernst Glück was subsidized by the Swedish government. Schools for Latvian speaking peasantry were set up in the country parishes. In Latvian history this period is generally praised as the "good Swedish times".

=== Duchy of Courland and Semigallia, 1562–1795 ===
Duchy of Courland and Semigallia in 1740

After Gotthard Kettler became the first duke, other members of the Order became the nobility, with their fiefdoms becoming their estates. Kettler received nearly one-third of the land in the new duchy. Mitau (Jelgava) was designated as the capital and a Landtag was to meet there twice a year.

When Gotthard Kettler died in 1587, his sons Friedrich and Wilhelm became the dukes of Courland. They divided the Duchy into two parts in 1596. Friedrich controlled the eastern part, Semigalia (Zemgale), with his residence in Mitau (Jelgava). Wilhelm owned the western part, Courland (Kurzeme), with his residence in Goldingen (Kuldīga). Wilhelm regained the Grobiņa district when he married the daughter of the Duke of Prussia. Here he developed metalworking, shipyards, and the new ships delivered the goods of Courland to other countries. Wilhelm's conflict with local nobles ended with his removal from the duke's seat in 1616 and Friedrich became the only duke of Courland after 1616.

Under the next duke, Jacob Kettler, the Duchy reached the peak of its prosperity. During his travels in Western Europe, Jacob became the eager proponent of mercantilist ideas. Metalworking and ship building became much more developed, and powder mills began producing gunpowder. Trading relations developed not only with nearby countries but also with Britain, France, the Netherlands and Portugal. Jacob established the merchant fleet of the Duchy of Courland, with its main harbours in Windau and Libau. In Windau 120 ships were built, of which over 40 were warships. The duchy owned a large fleet and established two colonies — St. Andrews Island in the estuary of Gambia River (in Africa) and Tobago Island (in the Caribbean Sea). Courland related place names from this period still survive today in these places.

The last duke, Peter von Biron who ruled under heavy Russian influence founded Academia Petrina in 1775. In April 1786 he purchased the Duchy of Sagan from the Bohemian Lobkovic family, from then additionally using the title of Duke of Żagań. In 1795, Russia determined the further fate of Courland when with its allies it began the third division of Poland. Given a "nice recommendation" by Russia, Duke gave up his rights in return for a large payment, signing the final document on March 28, 1795.

=== Enlightenment and Latvians ===
Enlightenment ideas influenced local Baltic Germans, two of whom played great role in the creation of Latvian nation. Gotthard Friedrich Stender wrote the first Latvian-German and German-Latvian dictionaries. He also wrote the first encyclopedia “The book of high wisdom of the world and nature” (1774) and the first illustrated Latvian alphabet book (1787).

Garlieb Merkel in 1796 published his book “The Latvians” in which exposed the horrible conditions of serfdom under which Latvians were forced to live because of cruelty of their German masters.

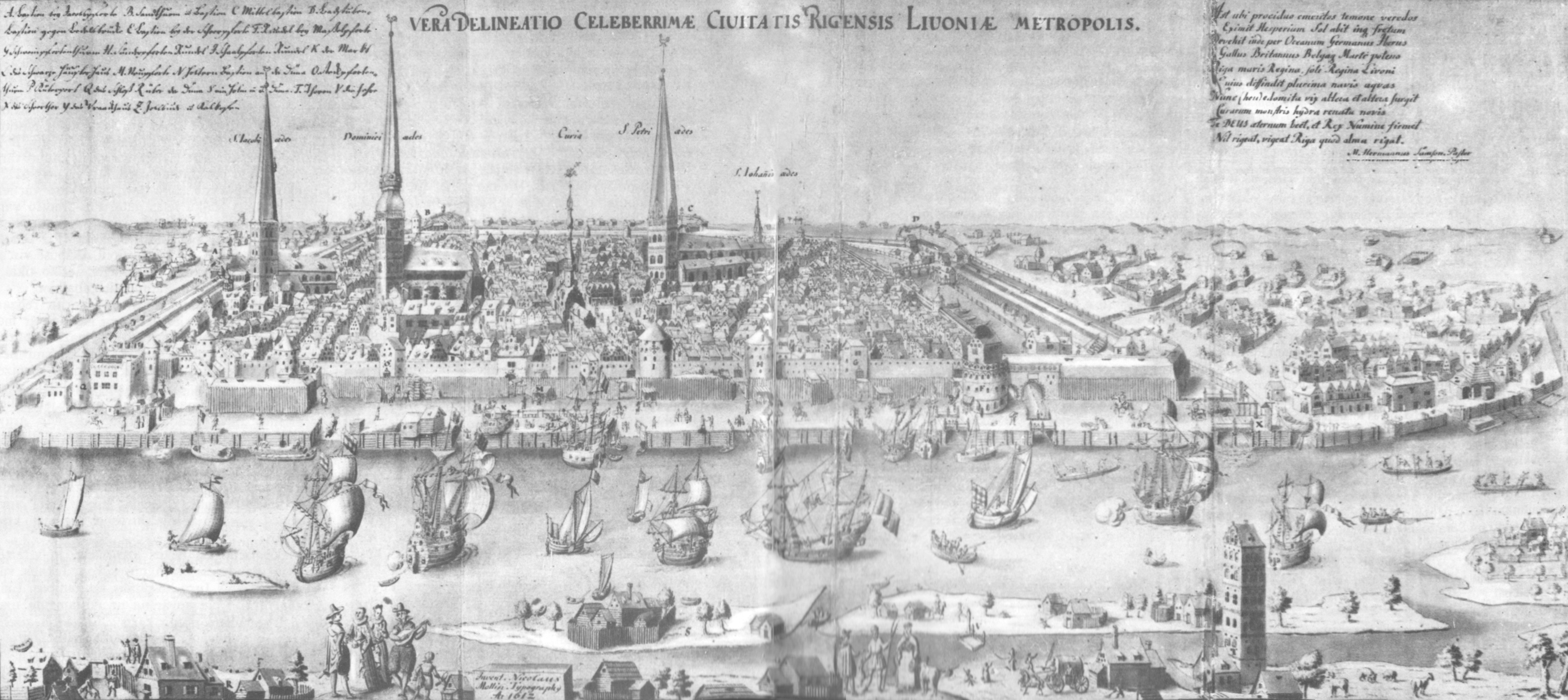
Riga in 1612

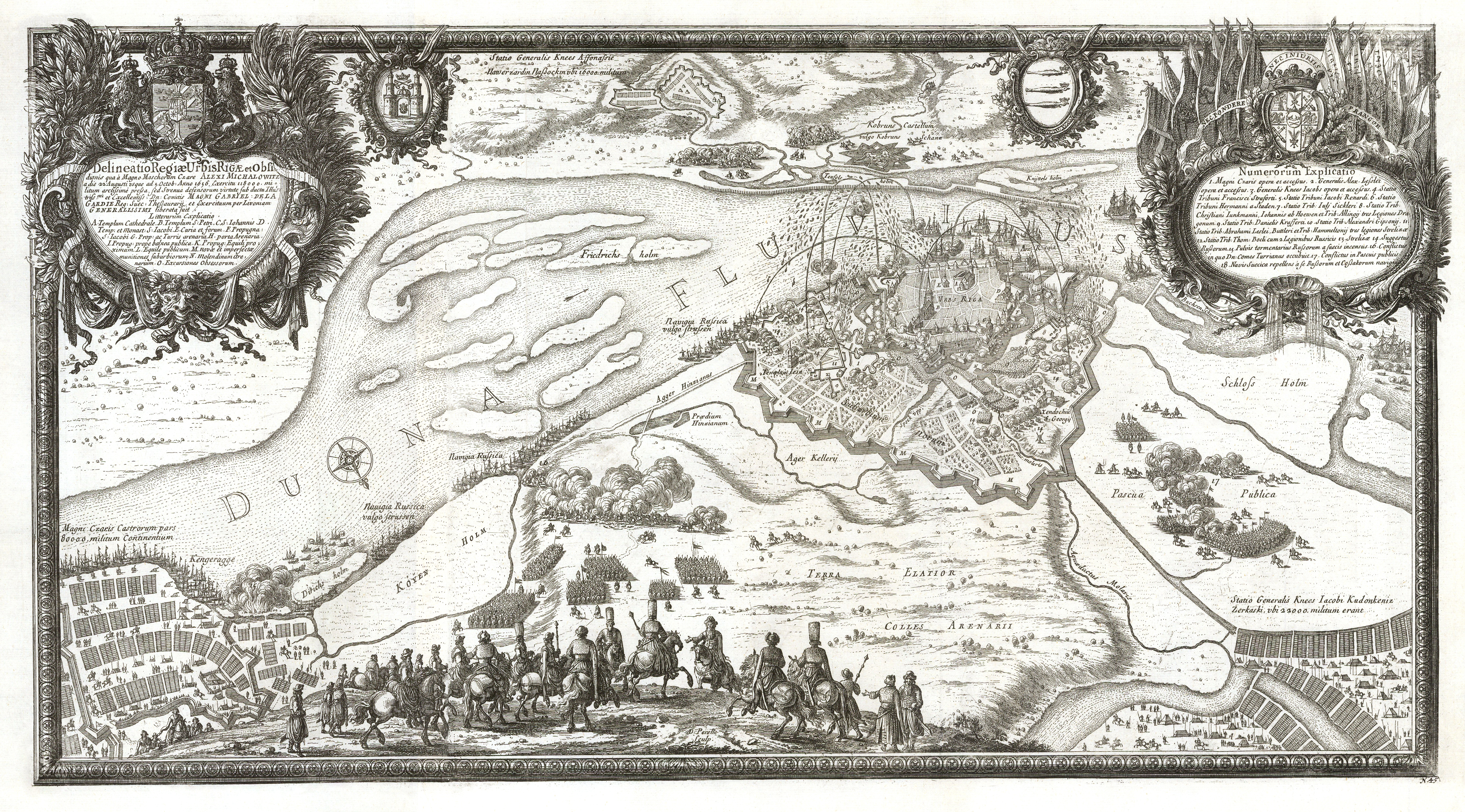
Siege of Riga in 1656

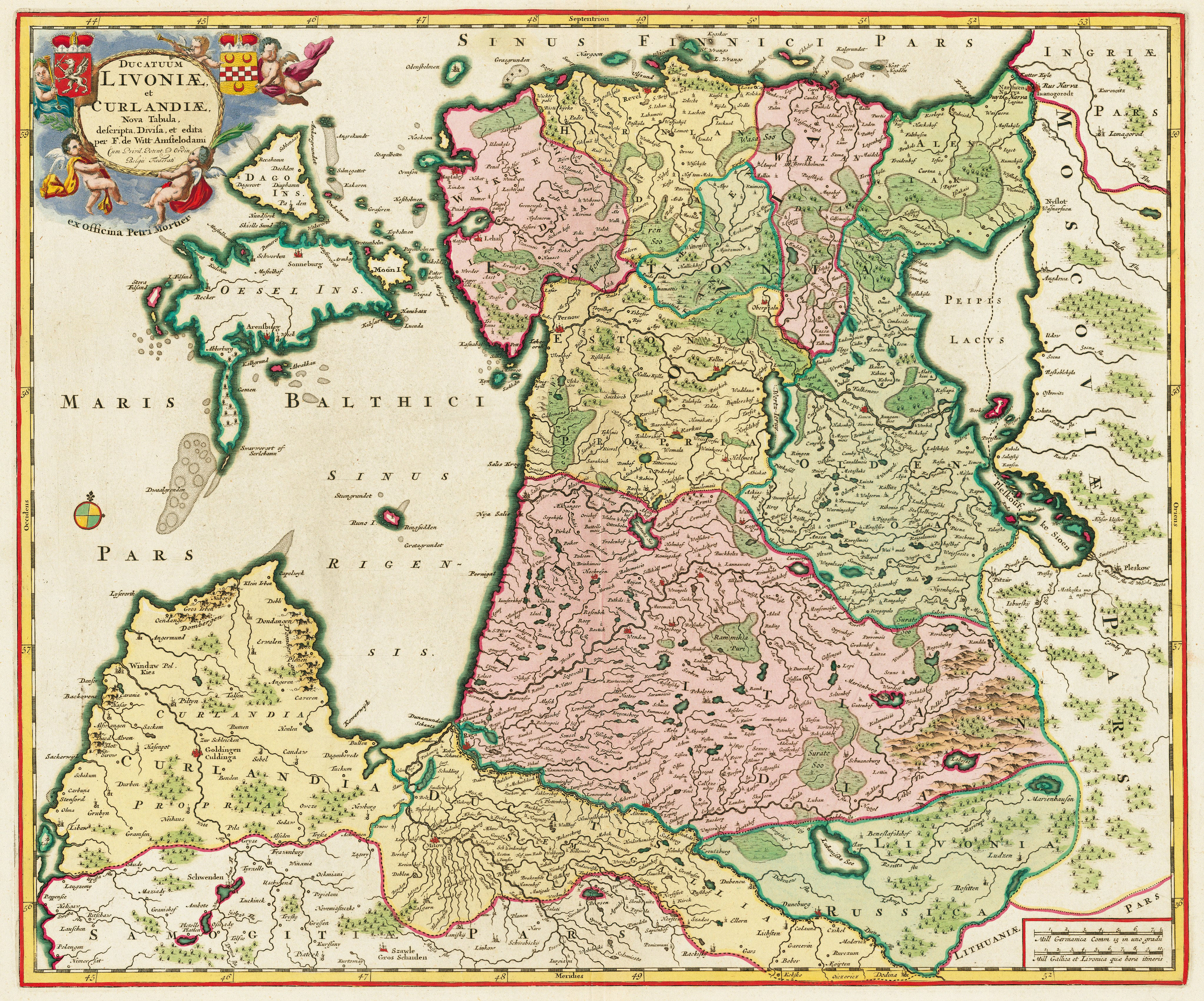
Livonia and Courland in 1705

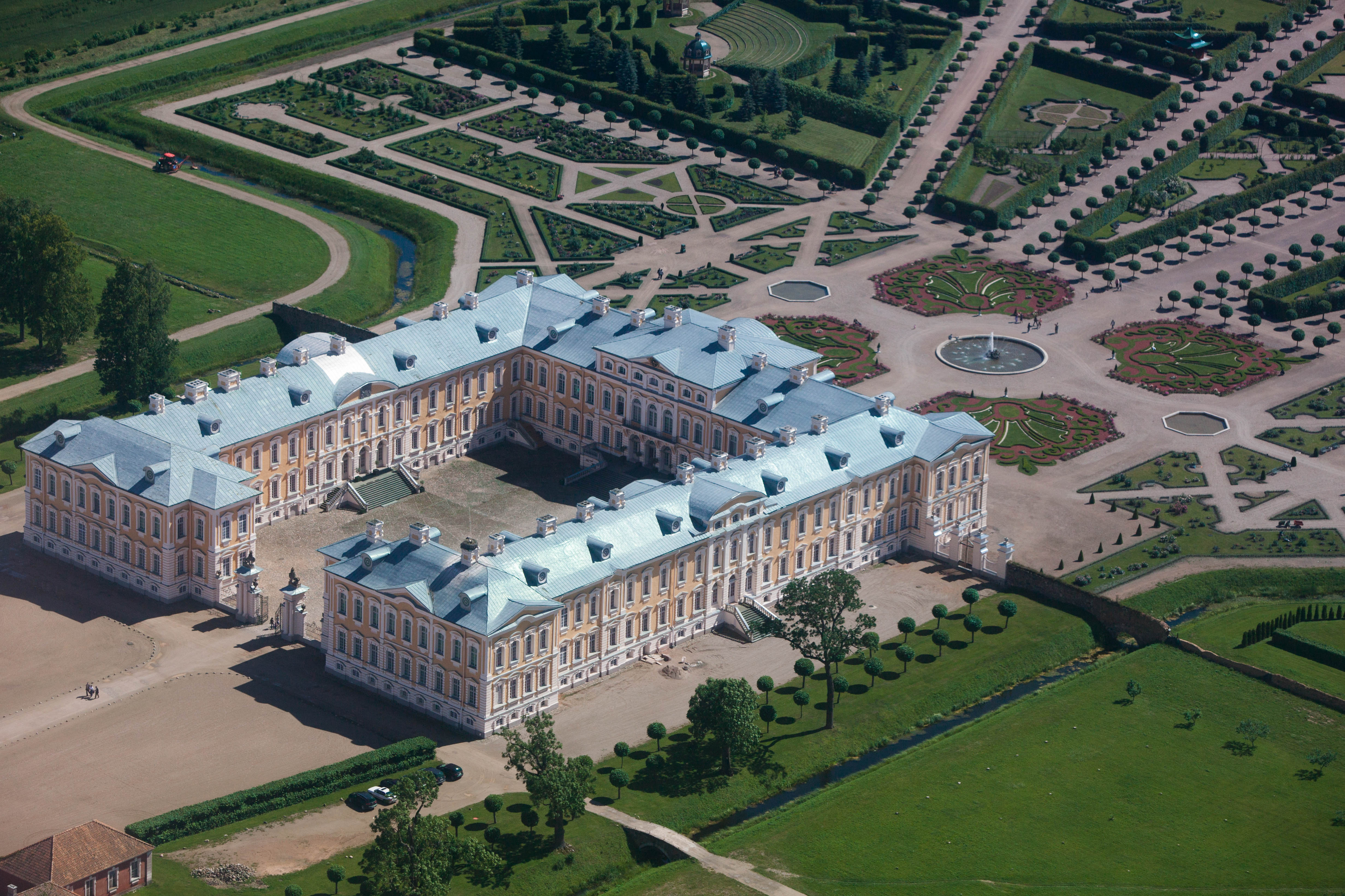
Rundāle Palace, the summer residence of Duke von Biron

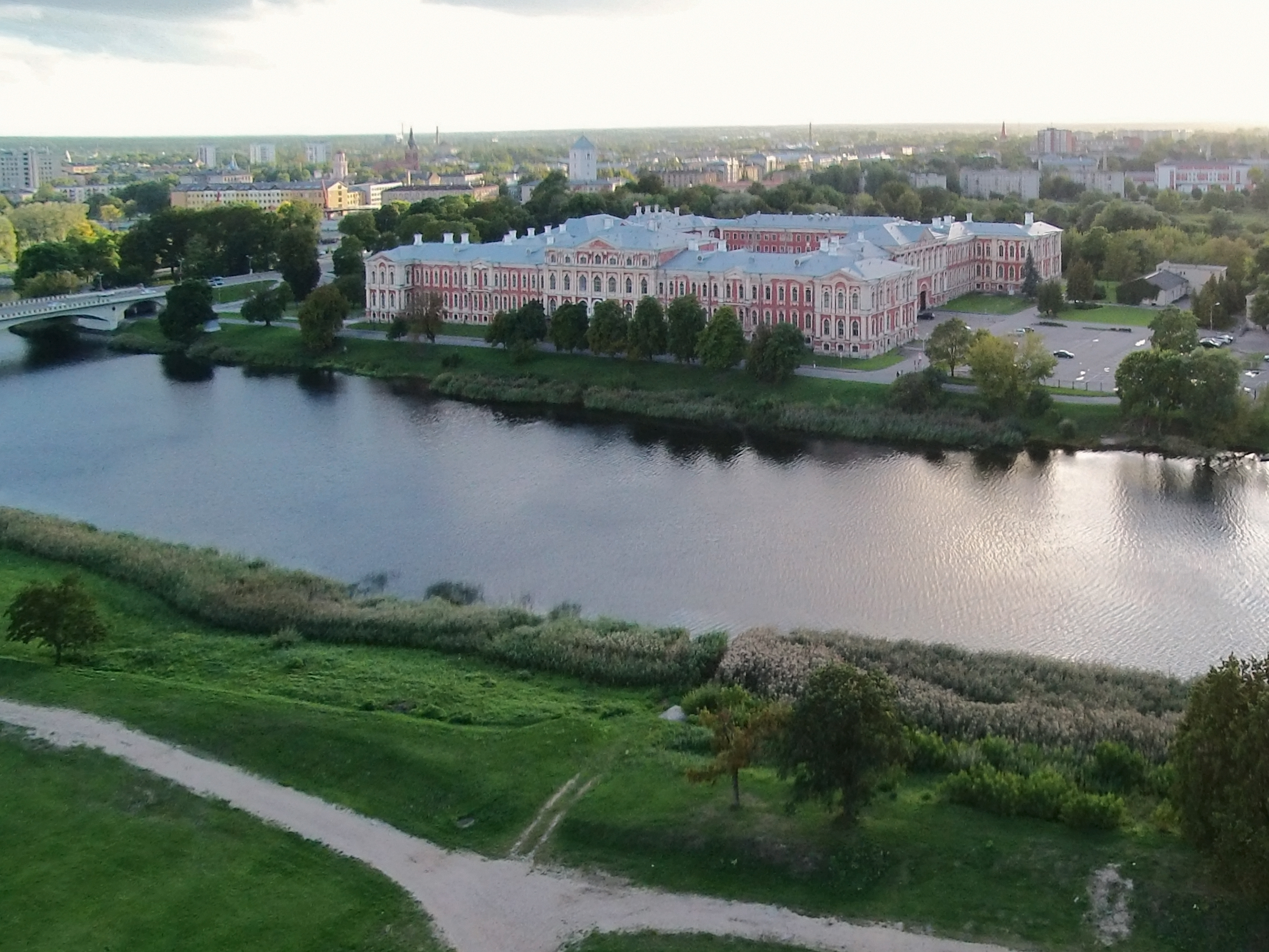
Jelgava Palace, the main residence of Duke von Biron

== Russian period, 1721/95–1915/18 ==
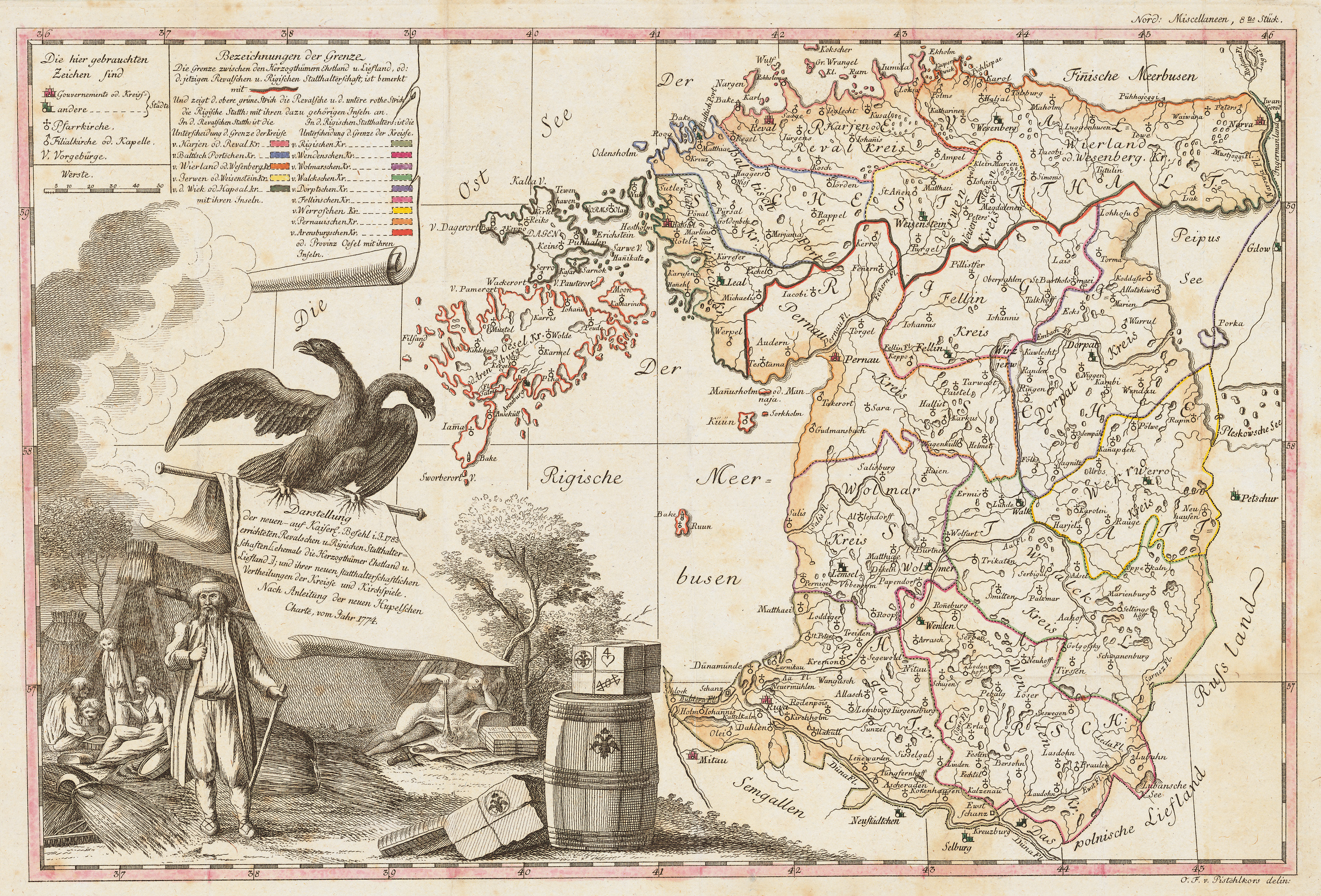
Map of Riga and Reval Lieutenancies, 1783

In 1700 the Great Northern War between Sweden and Russia started largely because Peter the Great wanted to secure and enlarge Russian access to the Baltic ports. In 1710 Russians conquered Riga and Estonia and Livonia capitulated. Losses from the military actions were multiplied by the Great Northern War plague outbreak which killed up to 75% of people in some areas.

In 1713 Peter established the Riga Governorate, and after various administrative and territorial reforms, the Governorate of Livonia was finally established in 1796. Latvians call it Vidzeme Governorate (Vidzemes guberņa). Sweden officially gave up its claims to Swedish Livonia with the 1721 Treaty of Nystad. The Treaty enshrined the existing privileges and freedoms of the German Baltic nobility. They were allowed to maintain their financial system, existing customs border, self-governing provincial Landtags and city councils, Lutheran religion and German language. This special position in the Russian Empire was reconfirmed by all Russian Emperors from Peter the Great (reigned 1682–1725) to Alexander II (reigned 1855–1881). Only the 1889 judicial reform imposed Russian laws and a program of Russification enforced school education in Russian.

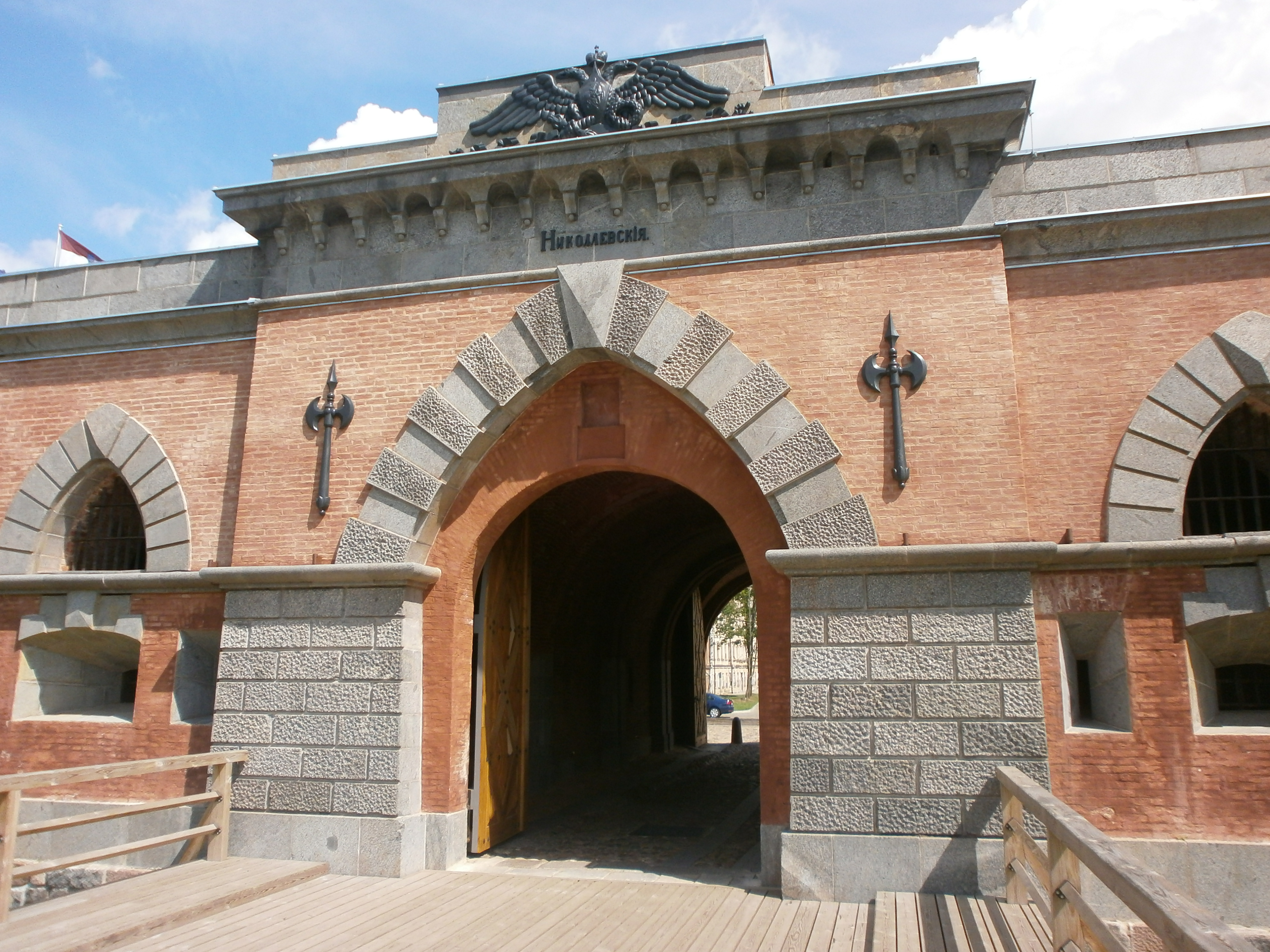
Nicholas gate of Daugavpils fortress

After the First Partition of Poland in 1772 Russia gained Inflanty Voivodeship which was first included in the Mogilev Governorate and after 1802 in Vitebsk Governorate. This led to the increased cultural and linguistic separation of Latgalians from the rest of ethnic Latvians. A large Daugavpils fortress was built here.

After the Third Partition of Poland and financial settlement with the last Duke of Courland and Semigallia in 1795 the Courland Governorate was created in which the Germans retained their privileges and autonomy for another century. Russian empire now possessed all the territories inhabited by Latvians.

In 1812 Napoleon's troops invaded Russia and the Prussian units under the leadership of Field Marshal Yorck occupied Courland and approached Riga and the Battle of Mesoten was fought. Napoleon proclaimed restoration of Duchy of Courland and Semigallia under French and Polish protectorate. The Russian governor-general of Riga Ivan Essen was expecting attack, and set the wooden houses of Riga suburbs on fire to deflect the invaders leaving thousands of city residents homeless. However, Yorck did not attack Riga and in December Napoleon's army retreated.

=== Emancipation of peasantry ===
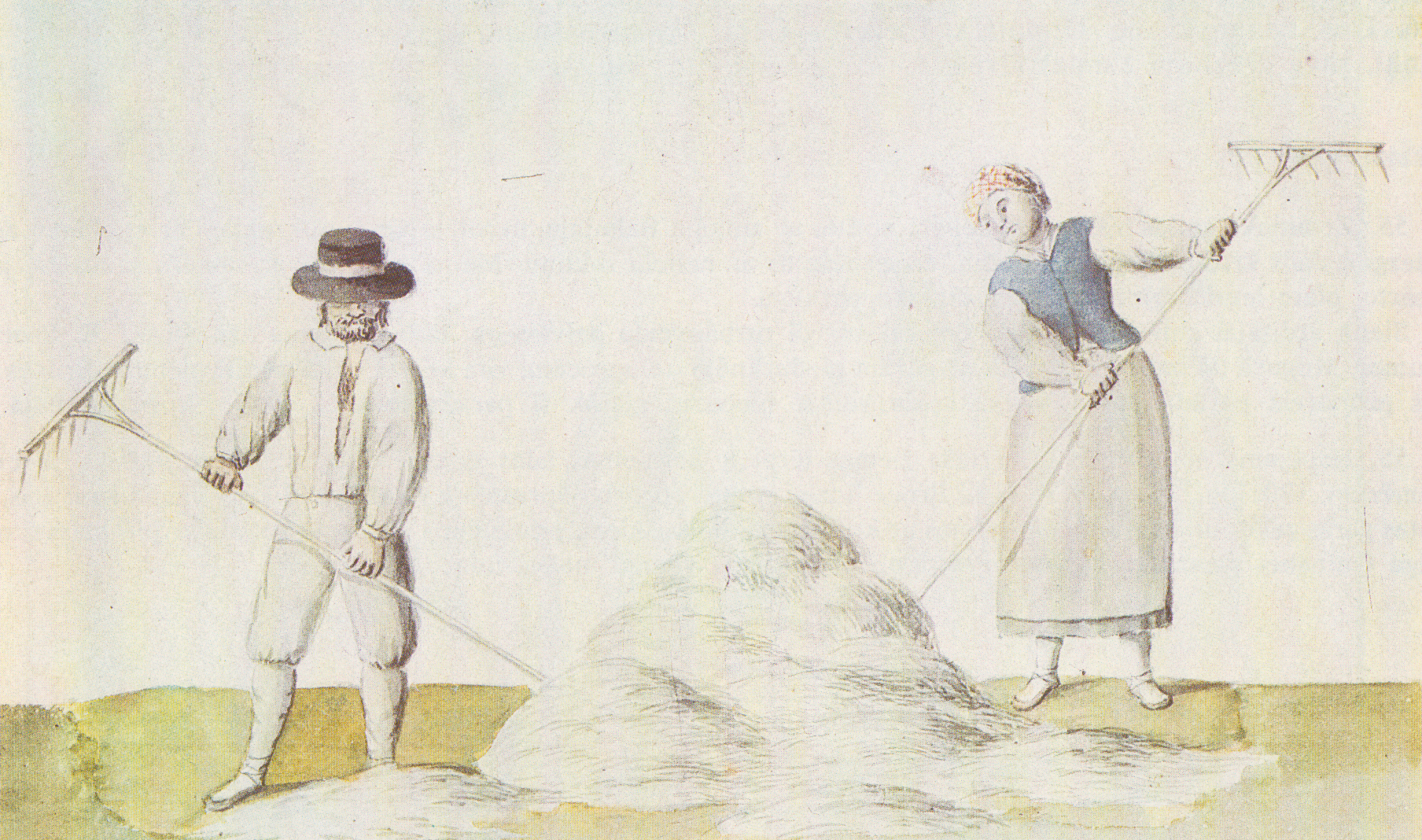
Latvian peasant couple working, 18–19th century

==== Livonian peasant law, 1804 ====
After the October 1802 Kauguri rebellion, czarist authorities reacted with the law of February 20, 1804, which was aimed at improving peasant condition in the Livonian Governorate. Peasants no longer were tied to the land owner, but to the land, so they could be sold only together with the land. Peasants were divided in two classes – people of manors and plowmen. Plowmen were divided into farm-owners and free people. Farms from now on could be inherited within the family. Amount and length of socage now was regulated and limited. This law was opposed by the nobles, who in 1809 secured changes in the law which again gave them more power over peasants and socage.

==== Emancipation in Courland, 1819 ====
In 1816 Governorate of Estonia proposed a law for emancipation of serfs which was based on the model of the Prussian reforms. Czarist authorities ordered Courland Landtag to come up with a similar proposal, which was accepted on August 25, 1817, and proclaimed in Jelgava on August 30, 1818, in presence of Czar Alexander I. Emancipation came into force in 1819 and continued until 1832 as only a selected number of peasants was emancipated each year. Emancipation gave peasants personal freedom, but no land, which they had to lease from land-owners. Peasants were not completely free, as they still could not move to another governorate or city without land-lord's permit.

==== Emancipation in Livonia, 1820 ====
After Emancipation in Estonia and Courland, the situation in Livonia was resolved by the law of March 26, 1819, which was very similar to the Emancipation law of Courland. It was proclaimed on early 1820 and was in force until 1832.

==== Emancipation in Latgale, 1861 ====
As Latgale was part of the Russian Vitebsk Governorate, serfdom here lasted until 1861, when the Emancipation reform of 1861 was proclaimed in the Russian Empire. Initially peasants kept their land, but had to continue performing socage and rent payments. This was ended by the new law of March 1, 1863.

=== Further reforms ===
After 1832 peasants were allowed freedom of settlement within the governorate, but only in 1848 Courland peasants were allowed to settle in towns and cities, many of which until then had mostly German and Jewish populations.

The provisional Livonian agrarian law of July 9, 1849 which came int force on November 20, 1850, maintained German nobility's property rights, but allowed peasants to rent or buy the land. By 1856 only 23% of farmers were paying land rent, while the rest were still performing socage. In 1860 this law became permanent and allowed increasing number of farmers to purchase their homes. An 1864 law permitted creation of credit unions, and this improved access to capital for farmers wanting to buy their homes from German land-lords. Just before the start of World War I about 99% of houses in Courland were bought and 90% in Livonia. This created a land-owning Latvian farmer class which increased in prosperity and sent its sons to schools of higher education.

In 1870-80s many peasants who were unable or unwilling to purchase their land, used the opportunity to emigrate to Siberia, where land was given for free. By the start of World War I approximately 200,000 Latvian farmers had moved to farming colonies in Siberia.

=== Giving of family names ===
While there are records of Latvian last names going as far back as 15th century, almost all of them were inhabitants of large cities and often adopted Germanic family names. Some peasants had family names in the 17th century, but majority had only first name until the emancipation. Most people were identified by the name of their house or manor. Emancipation created the need for identity papers and with this, for family names. Livonian peasants had to choose family names by 1826, in Courland majority names were selected in the campaign that lasted from October 1834 until July 1835. Peasants were prohibited from choosing family names of German nobility and majority chose names related to animals, plants and trees, especially popular were diminutive forms – Bērzs (birch), Bērziņš (small birch), Kalns (hill), Kalniņš (small hill).

=== Religion ===
Latvia was predominantly Lutheran and Catholic, but in 1729 Herrnhuter Brethren started their mission in Livonia, with center in Valmiera, their missionaries made significant headway despite the opposition of the German landlords who controlled the Lutheran clergy. The Imperial government proscribed the Moravians 1743–1764. This was the first Christian movement where Latvians become involved voluntarily. Brethren operated independently from the German landlords and their meeting houses were run by Latvians, giving them a chance to create their own communities. Brethren reached the peak of their popularity around 1820, a few years after serfdom was abolished in Livonia Governorate. 30 parishes had almost 100 meeting houses and 20,000 members.

The Imperial government sponsored the Russian Orthodox Church, as part of its program of russification, but Lutheranism remained the dominant religion, except Latgale where Catholicism was dominant. Other Protestant missions had some success including the Baptists, Methodists and Seventh Day Adventists.

In 1571 the first Jews were invited to settle in Piltene and a Courland Jewish community was formed. After incorporation into Russian Empire more Jews from the former Polish-Lithuanian Commonwealth settled here.

=== Latvian National Awakening ===
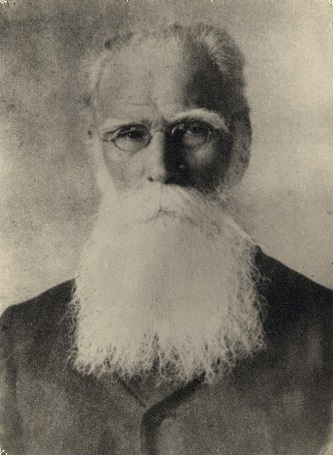
Krišjānis Barons, 1910

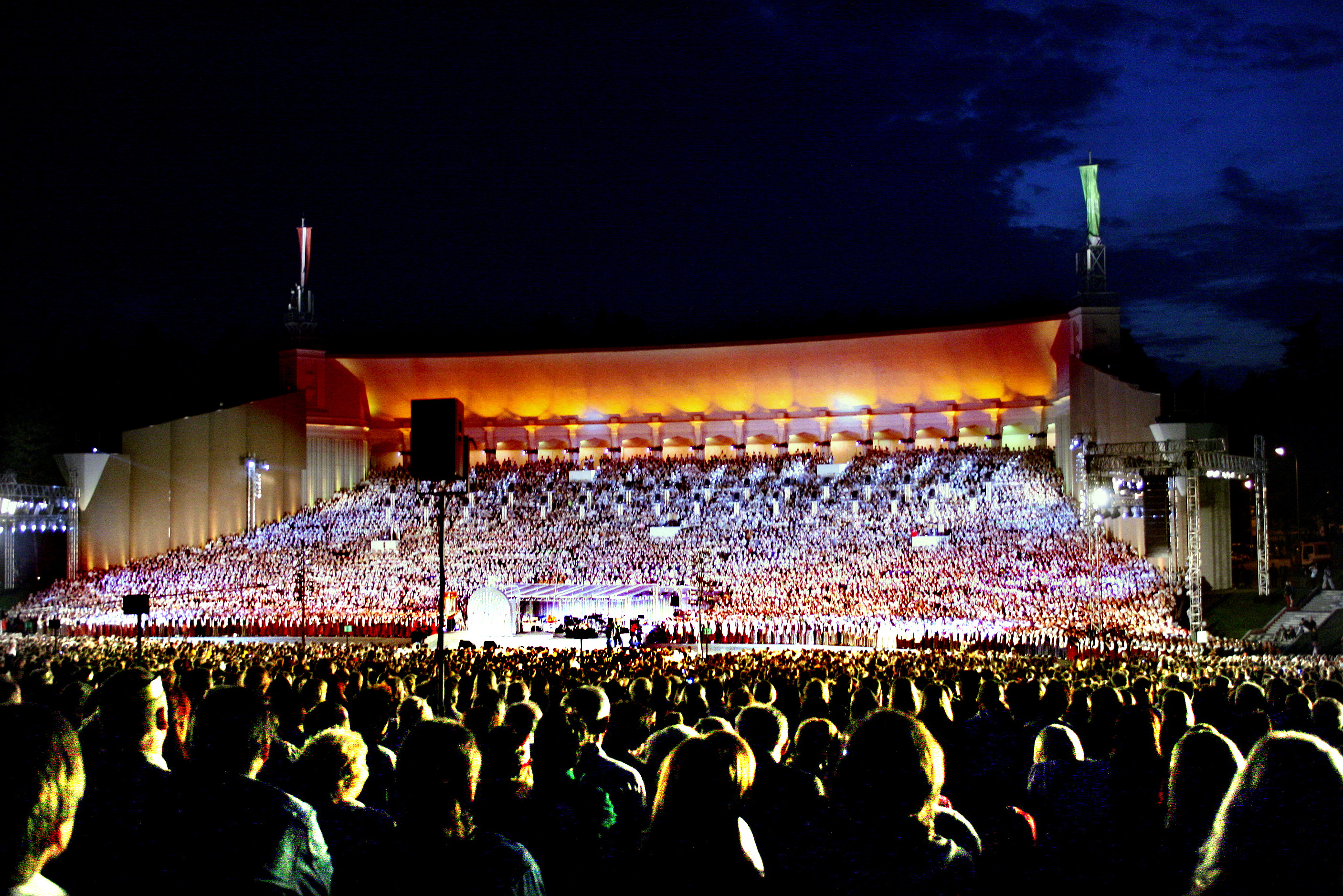
Latvian Song Festival, 2008

Latvian national awakening could start after the emancipation of serfs and growth in literacy and education rates. Educated Latvians no longer wanted to be Germanized.

In 1822 Latviešu avīzes (Latvian Newspapers) the first weekly in Latvian began publishing. In 1832 weekly Tas Latviešu Ļaužu Draugs began publishing. The first Latvian writers who wrote in Latvian appeared – Ansis Liventāls (1803–77), Jānis Ruģēns (1817–76) and others. In 1839 institute for the elementary school teachers led by Jānis Cimze opened in Valmiera.

By the middle of 19th century, the First Latvian National Awakening began among ethnic Latvian intellectuals, a movement that partly reflected similar nationalist trends elsewhere in Europe. This revival was led by the "Young Latvians" (in Latvian: jaunlatvieši) from the 1850s to the 1880s. Primarily a literary and cultural movement with significant political implications, the Young Latvians soon came into severe conflict with the Baltic Germans. During this time the notion of a united Latvian nation was born. Young Latvians also began to research Latvian folklore (See:Latvian dainas) and ancient beliefs.

In the 1880s and 1890s the russification policy was begun by Alexander III aimed at reducing German autonomy in the Baltic provinces. Introduction of the Russian language in administration, court and education was meant to reduce predominance of German language. At the same time these policies banned Latvian language from public sphere, especially schools, which was a heavy blow to the new Latvian culture.

With increasing poverty in many rural areas and growing urbanization and industrialization (especially of Riga), a loose but broad leftist movement called the "New Current" arose in the late 1880s. It was led by the future National poet Rainis and his brother-in-law Pēteris Stučka, editors of the newspaper Dienas Lapa. This movement was soon influenced by Marxism and led to the creation of the Latvian Social Democratic Labour Party. While Rainis remained a social democrat until his death, Stučka became allied with Lenin, established the first Bolshevik state in Latvia and died in Moscow.

=== 1905 Revolution ===
Latvia welcomed the 20th century with an explosion of popular discontent during the 1905 Revolution. It started with the shooting of demonstrators in Riga on January 13, progressed to mass strikes in October and armed uprising in December. The revolution was aimed not only against the czarist authorities, but against the hated German barons. For in Latvia most did not feel primarily oppressed by Russia or Russians, but by the Baltic Germans —roughly seven percent of the population— who had instituted a feudal system with themselves at the top and Latvian-speakers being left mostly poor and landless. As such, it involved not only left wing social democrats and industrial workers, but also more conservative peasants and Latvian intelligentsia since —despite being second class citizens in their own country— Latvia was also a highly literate and industrialised society. Riga was behind only St. Petersburg and Moscow by the number of industrial workers, and at the turn of the century over 90% of Latvians could read. In this regard, Latvia was equally primed for radical leftism and nationalism. In all, spearheaded by the Latvian Social Democratic Workers’ Party (LSDSP), the governorates making up what is now Latvia were probably the most ungovernable in the whole Russian Empire.

Following the shooting of demonstrators in St. Petersburg on January 9, 1905, a wide-scale general strike began in Riga. On January 13 Russian army troops opened fire on demonstrators in Riga killing 73 and injuring 200 people.

During the summer of 1905 the main revolutionary events moved to the countryside. 470 new parish administrative bodies were elected in 94% of the parishes in Latvia. The Congress of Parish Representatives was held in Riga in November. Mass meetings and demonstrations took place including violent attacks against Baltic German nobles, burning estate buildings and seizure of estate property, including weapons. In total 449 German manor houses were burned.

In the autumn of 1905 armed conflict between the German nobility and the Latvian peasants began in the rural areas of Vidzeme and Courland. In Courland, the peasants seized or surrounded several towns where they established revolutionary councils. In Vidzeme the fighters controlled the Rūjiena-Pärnu railway line. Altogether, a thousand armed clashes were registered in Latvia in 1905.

Martial law was declared in Courland in August 1905 and in Vidzeme in late November. Special punitive expeditions by Cossack cavalry units and Baltic Germans were dispatched in mid-December to suppress the movement. They executed over 2000 people without trial or investigation and burned 300 houses and public buildings. The executed often were local teachers or peasant activists who had shown disrespect to German nobles, not necessarily hardened revolutionaries. 427 people were court martialed and executed. 2652 people were exiled to Siberia, over 5000 went into exile to Western Europe or the US. In 1906 the revolutionary movement gradually subsided but some local protests and actions of forest guerrillas continued until 1907. They executed some daring raids – freeing their imprisoned comrades from Riga police HQ on January 17, 1906, February 26, 1906 Helsinki bank robbery and the 1910 Siege of Sidney Street in London.

Among the exiles were activists from the left and right who in just 10 years would fight against each other over the future of Latvia, such as the future Prime Minister Kārlis Ulmanis, National poet Jānis Rainis and early Cheka leader Jēkabs Peterss.

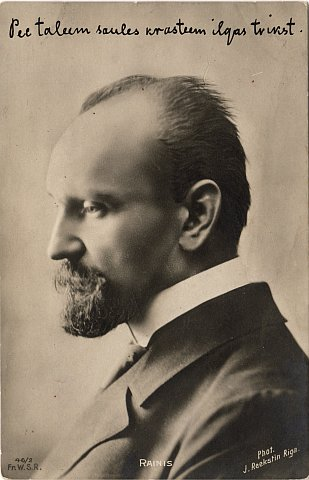
Jānis Rainis, ca. 1900

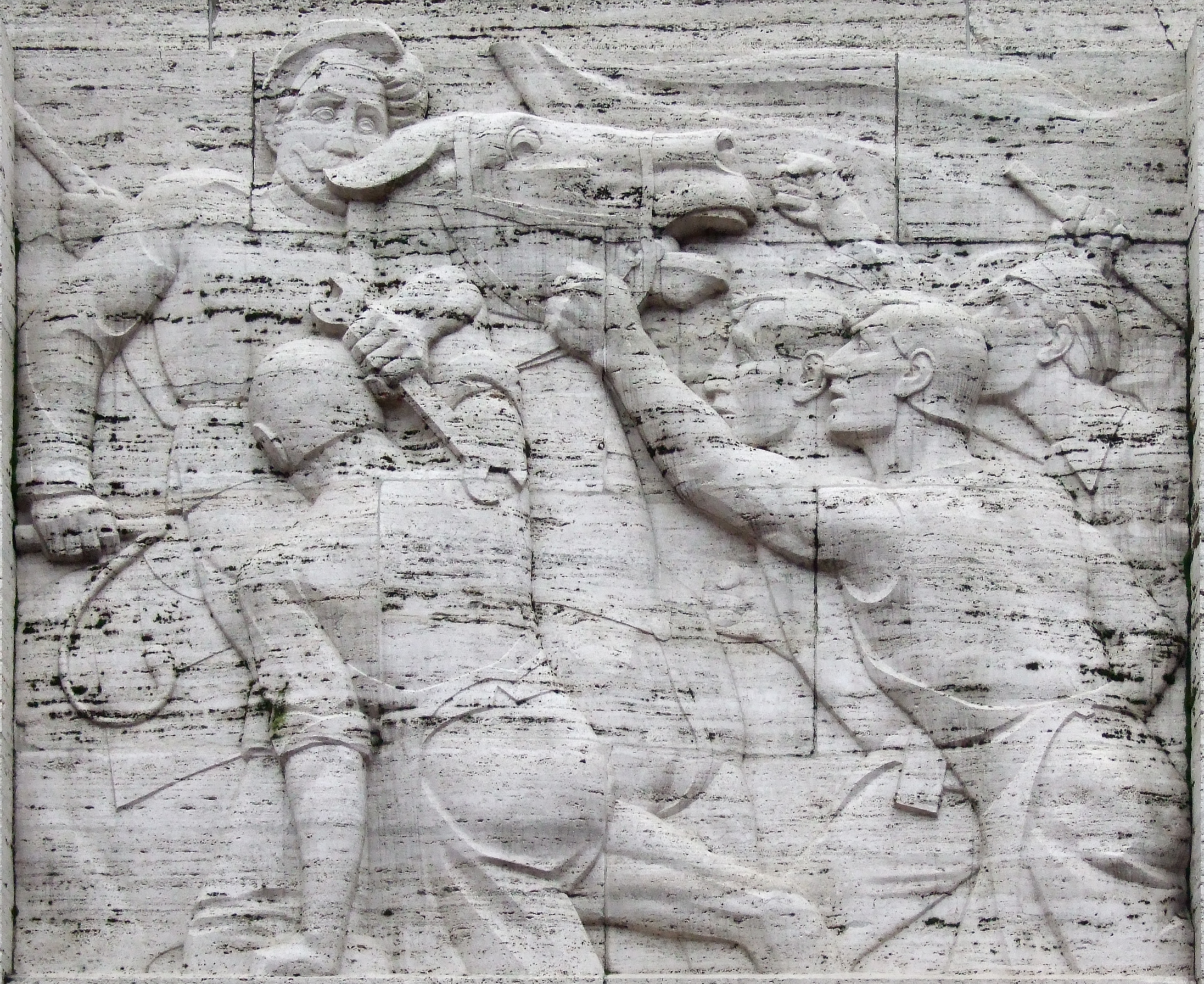
Latvian workers against a Cossack, Freedom Monument

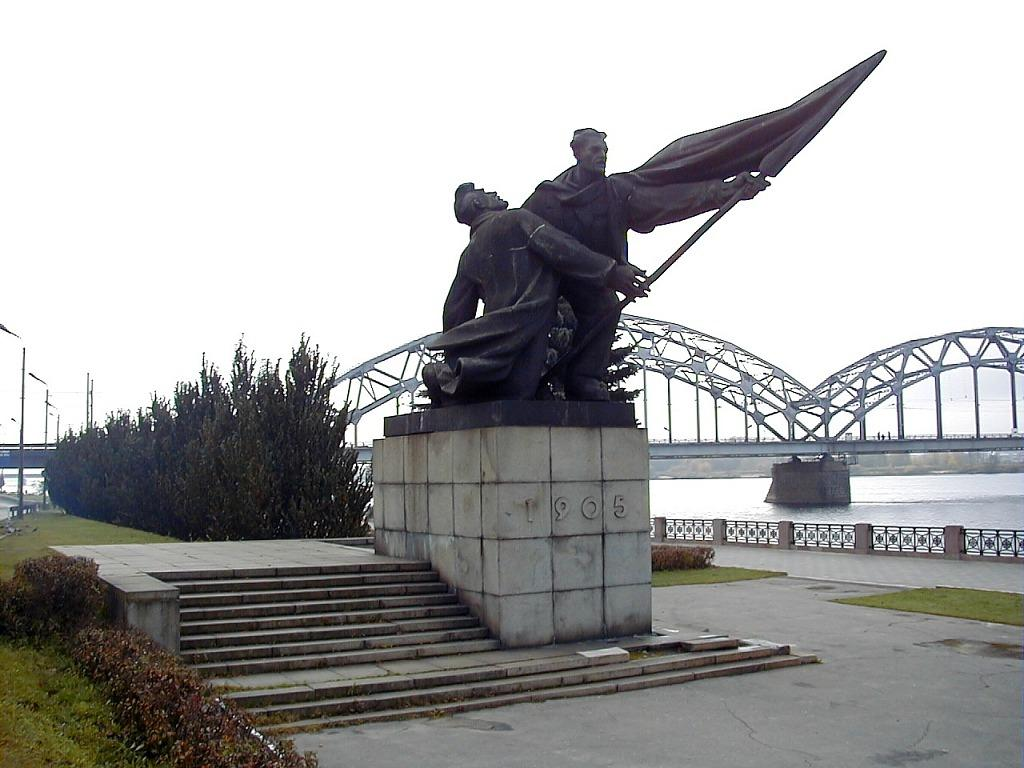
Monument to the victims of January 13, 1905

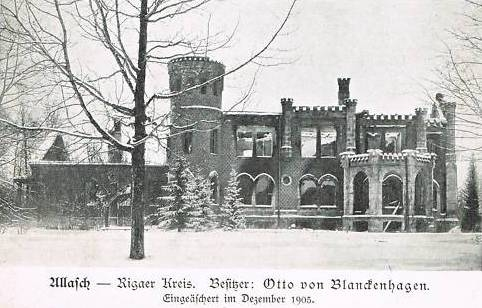
The burned Allaži manor house

== World War I ==
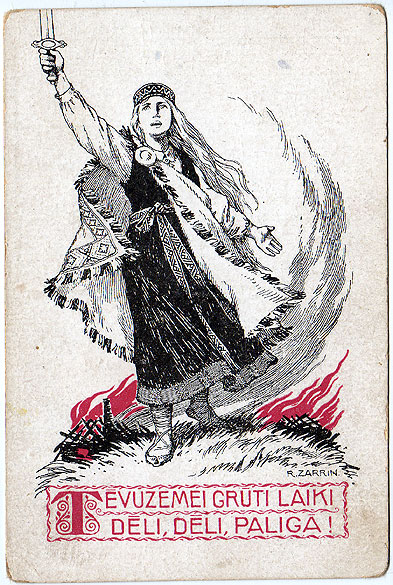
Hard times for the fatherland, sons, sons, help! A patriotic postcard, 1916.

On August 1, 1914, Germany declared war on Russia. Since Courland Governorate had a direct border with Germany it was immediately involved in warfare. On August 2 German warships SMS Augsburg and SMS Magdeburg shelled port city Liepāja, causing it light damage. On August 19 German navy tried to capture Užava Lighthouse but were repelled, after which German artillery destroyed it. In October British submarines HMS E1 and HMS E9 from the British submarine flotilla in the Baltic arrived in Liepāja. On November 17 German navy again shelled Liepāja and military installations of Karosta damaging some 100 buildings.

Many Latvians served in the Russian units stationed at German border and took part in Russian invasion of East Prussia. They participated in the early battles of First Battle of the Masurian Lakes, Second Battle of the Masurian Lakes and Battle of Augustow; total Latvian losses during these battles might have reached 25,000 dead.

=== German attack and refugees ===
By May 1915 the war reached most of Latvia. On April 30 Russian Commander-in-Chief ordered the evacuation of all Jews from Courland within 24 hours. On May 2, 1915, German attack against Jelgava was repelled. On May 7 the Germans captured Liepāja and Kuldīga.

On June 29 the Russian Supreme Command ordered the whole population of Courland evacuated, and around 500,000 refugees fled to the east. Much of the crops and housing was destroyed by the army to prevent them from falling into the German hands. Some of the refugees settled in Vidzeme but most continued their way to Russia where they had to settle in primitive conditions, suffering from hunger and diseases. In August 1915 the Latvian Refugee Aid Central Committee was established in Petrograd, it was run by future politicians Vilis Olavs, Jānis Čakste and Arveds Bergs. Committee organized refugee housing, organized 54 schools, 25 hospitals and distributed aid. Many refugees returned to Latvia only after 1920, when a peace treaty was signed between Latvia and Soviet Russia. Many Latvians stayed in the new Bolshevik state, achieving high army and party offices, only to be purged and executed by Stalin during 1937–38.

On July 19, 1915, the Russian War Minister ordered the factories of Riga evacuated together with their workers. In the summer of 1915, 30,000 railway wagons loaded with machines and equipment from factories were taken away reducing the population of Riga by some 50%. This action effectively destroyed Riga as a great industrial center until the later industrialization under the Soviet regime.

On August 1, the Germans captured the capital of Courland, Jelgava. A week later Battle of the Gulf of Riga started and eventually was lost by Germany. By October 23, Germans captured Ilūkste and were within the striking distance of Daugavpils with its fortress.

=== Latvian Riflemen ===
After on July 17 and 18, 1915 Germans captured Dobele, Talsi, Tukums and Ventspils, a public proclamation by State Duma members, written by Kārlis Skalbe, called for the formation of volunteer Latvian Riflemen units. In August the formation of Latvian battalions started. From 1915 to 1917, the Riflemen fought in the Russian army against the Germans in defensive positions along the Daugava River, notably the Nāves sala (Island of Death) bridgehead position. In December 1916 and January 1917, they suffered heavy casualties in month-long Christmas Battles. Many of them were buried in the newly created Riga Brothers' Cemetery.

After the great offensive of 1915, the front line stabilized along the Daugava river until the Russian army started to collapse in early 1917. In February 1917 Revolution broke out in Russia and in the summer the Russian army collapsed. By this time the Riflemen had overwhelmingly transferred their allegiances to the Bolsheviks. The following German offensive was successful and on September 3, 1917, they entered Riga.

In November 1917, the Communist Bolsheviks took power in Russia. Even though ethnic Latvians had become important assets in the task of securing Soviet power military (with the first ever commander-in-chief of the Red Army being Latvian Jukums Vācietis) the Bolshevik government tried to end the war and in March 1918, the Treaty of Brest-Litovsk was signed which gave Courland and Livland Governorate to the Germans, who quickly established occupational regime which lasted until November 11, 1918. During this time Germans tried to create the United Baltic Duchy in perpetual union with the Crown of Prussia.

=== War damages ===
A survey in 1920 established that 56,7% of parishes had war damages. Population had decreased from 2,55 million to 1,59 million. The number of ethnic Latvians has never again reached the 1914 levels. 87,700 buildings were destroyed. 27% of the arable land laid in waste. Much of the industry was evacuated to Russia and lost forever. Ports were damaged by sunken ships, bridges blown up and railways damaged. 25,000 farms were destroyed, 70,000 horses, 170,000 cattle lost.

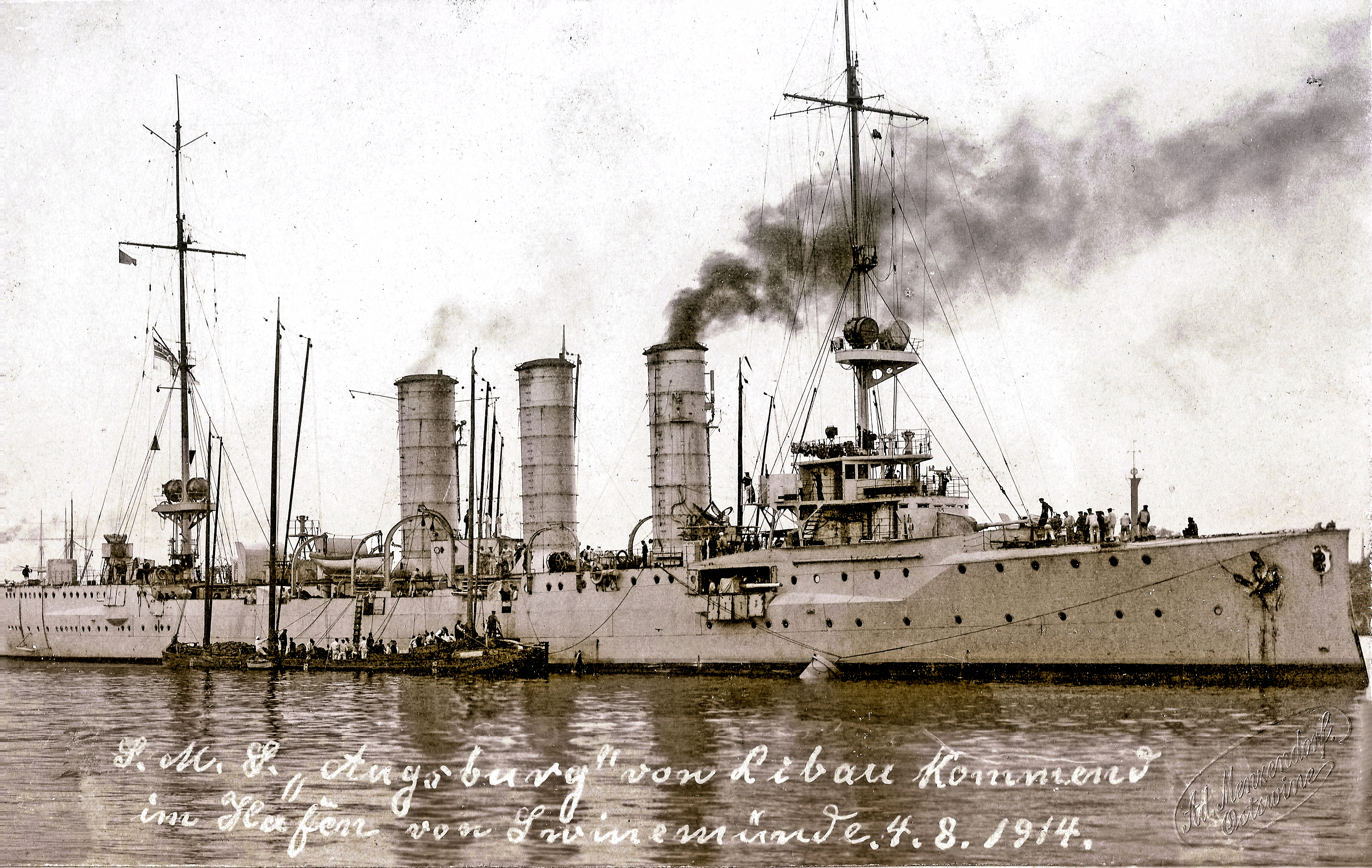
SMS Augsburg on August 4, 1914

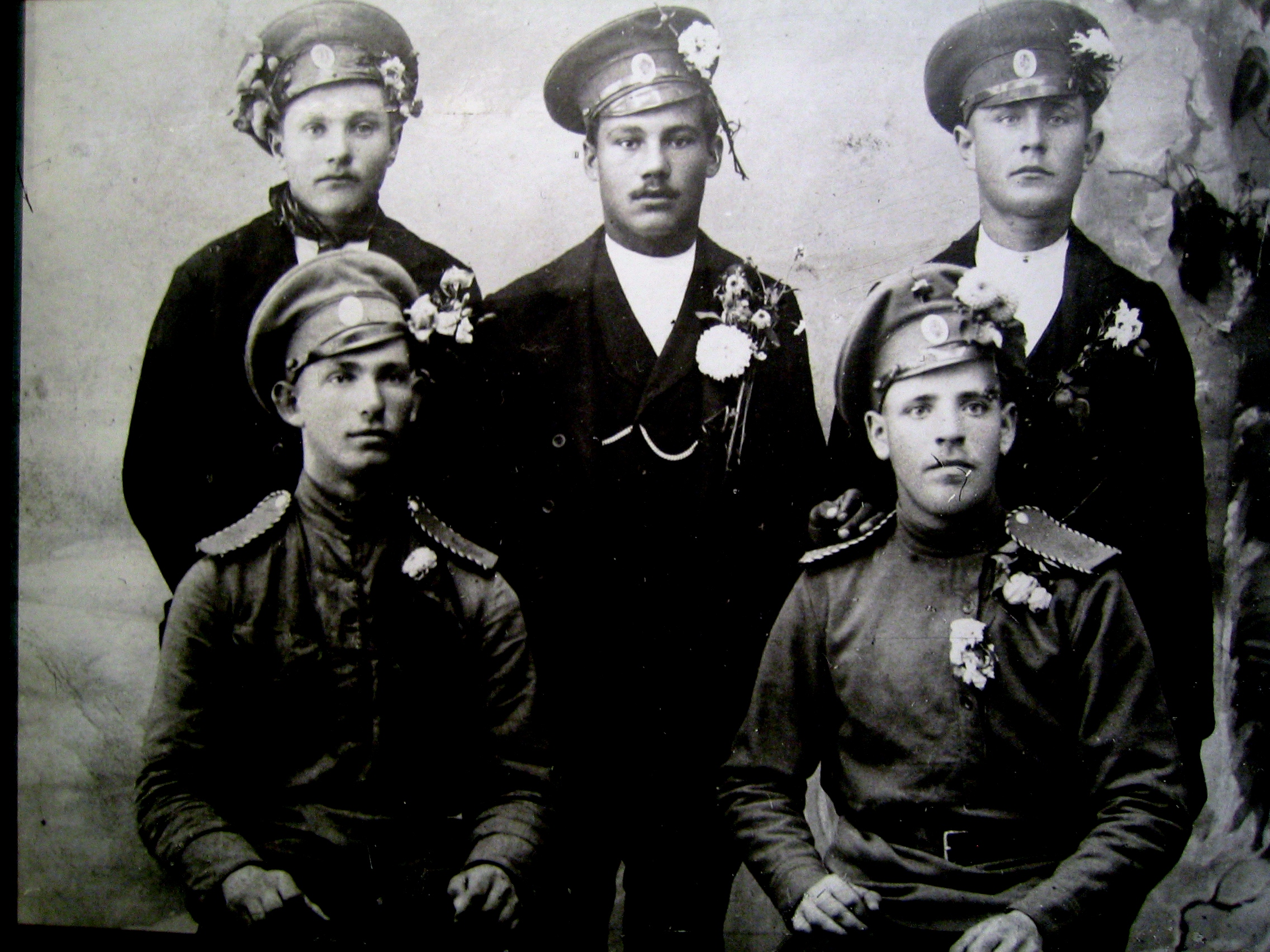
Volunteer riflemen, 1915

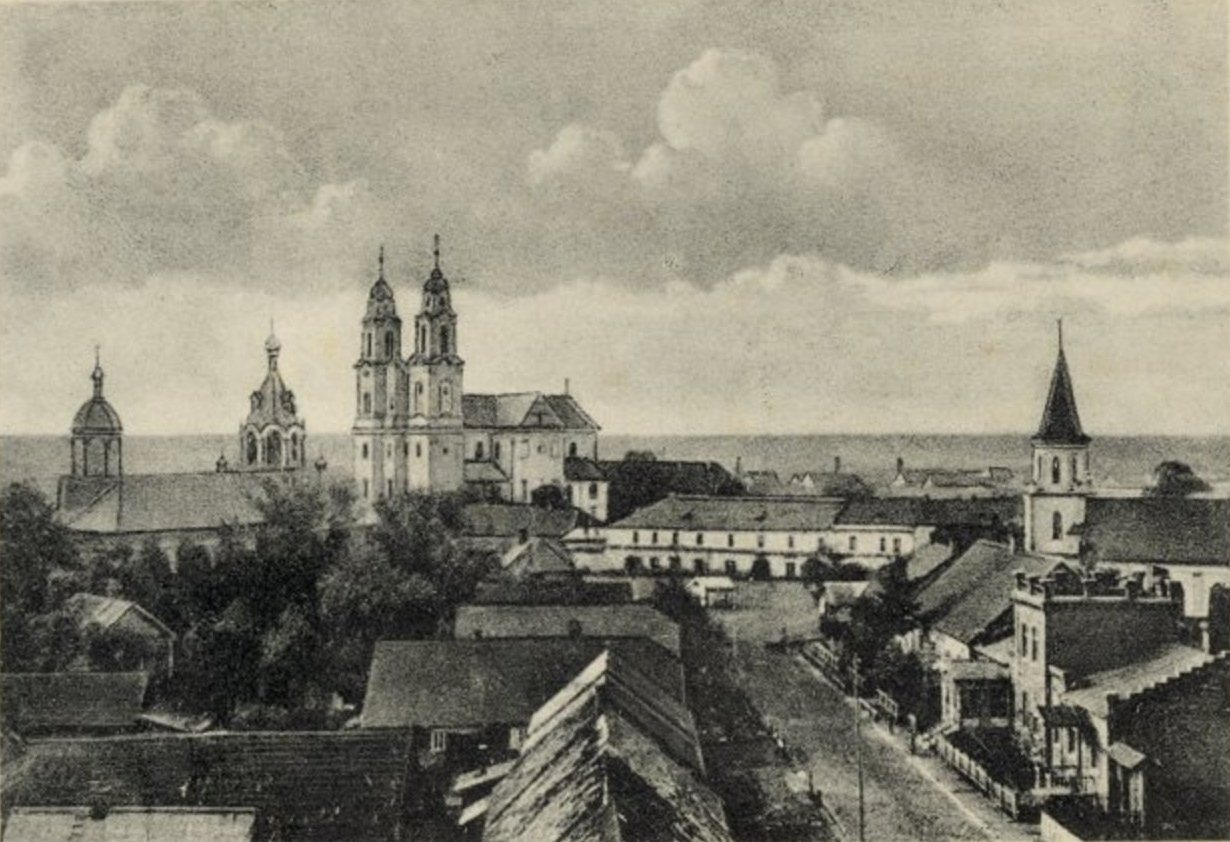
Ilūkste before destruction in 1915

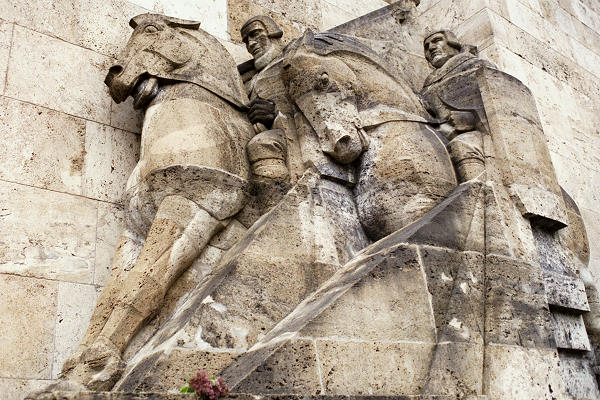
Riga Brother's Cemetery

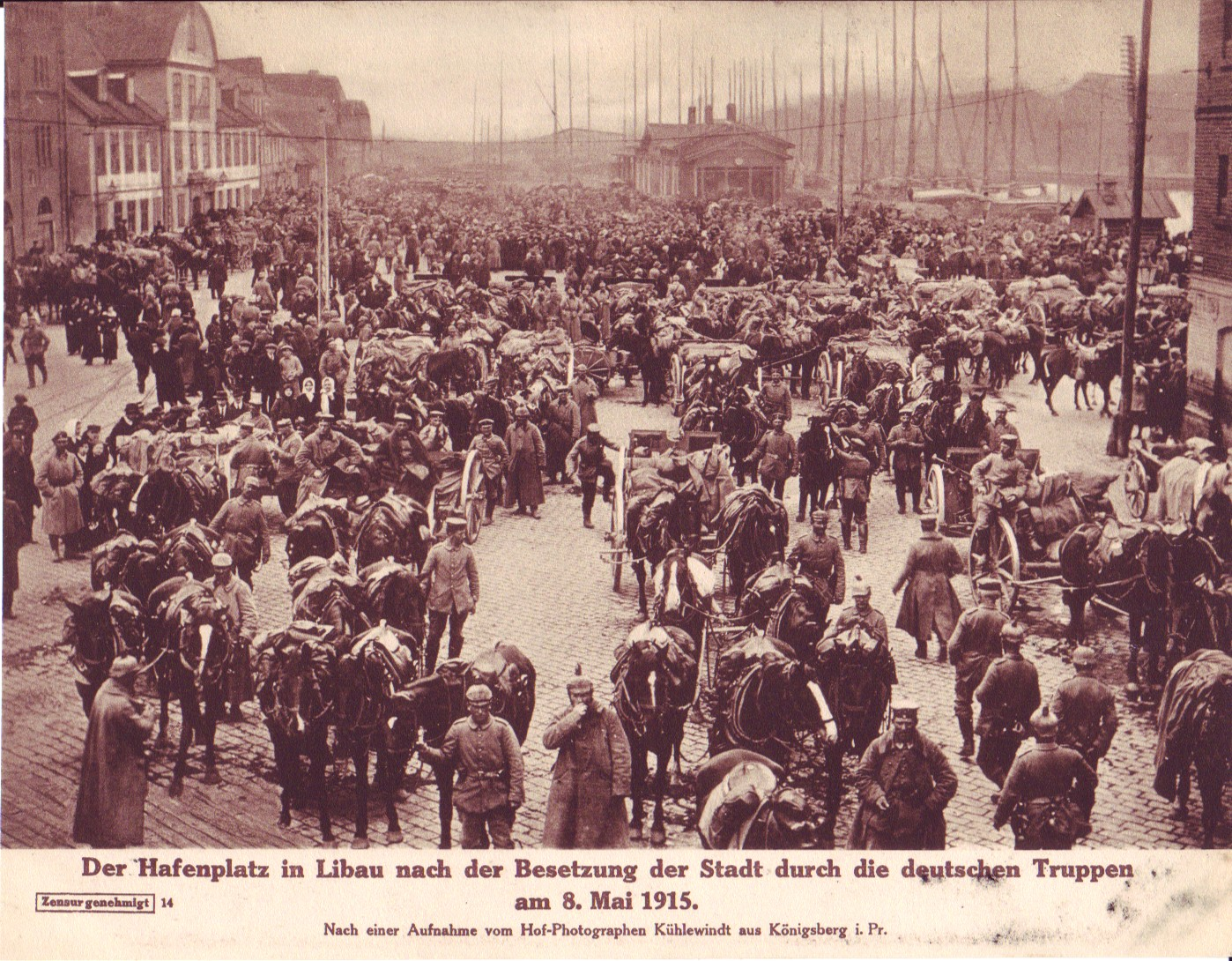
German troops in Liepāja, May 1915

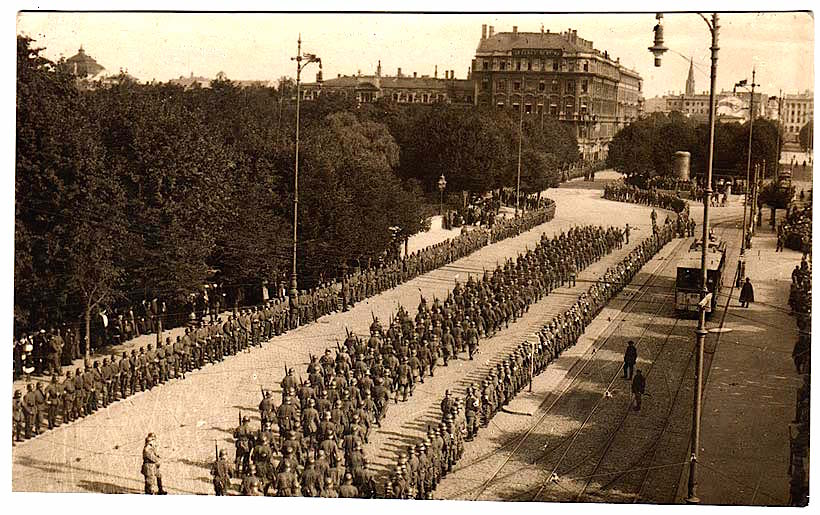
German parade in Riga, 1917

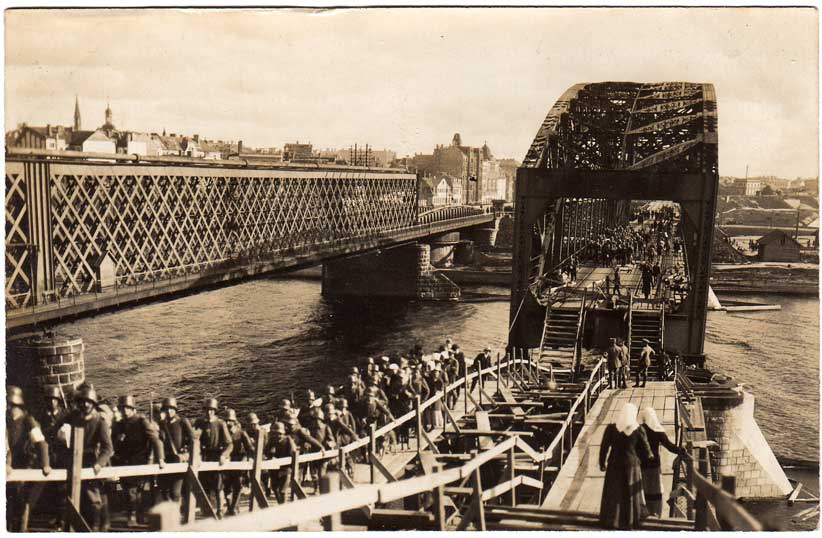
German troops on Riga railway bridge

== Competing statehood movements, 1917–1920 ==
Iskolat flag

Flag of the Republic of Latvia.

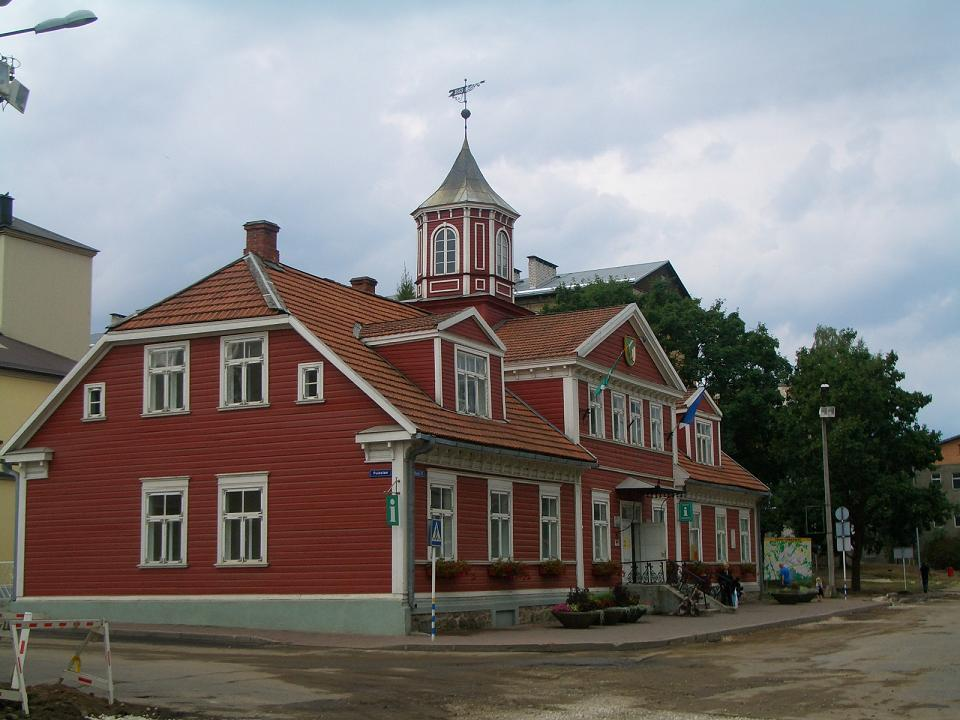
Valka Town Hall, where December 2, 1917 Declaration of Autonomy was issued. Now Valga in Estonia.

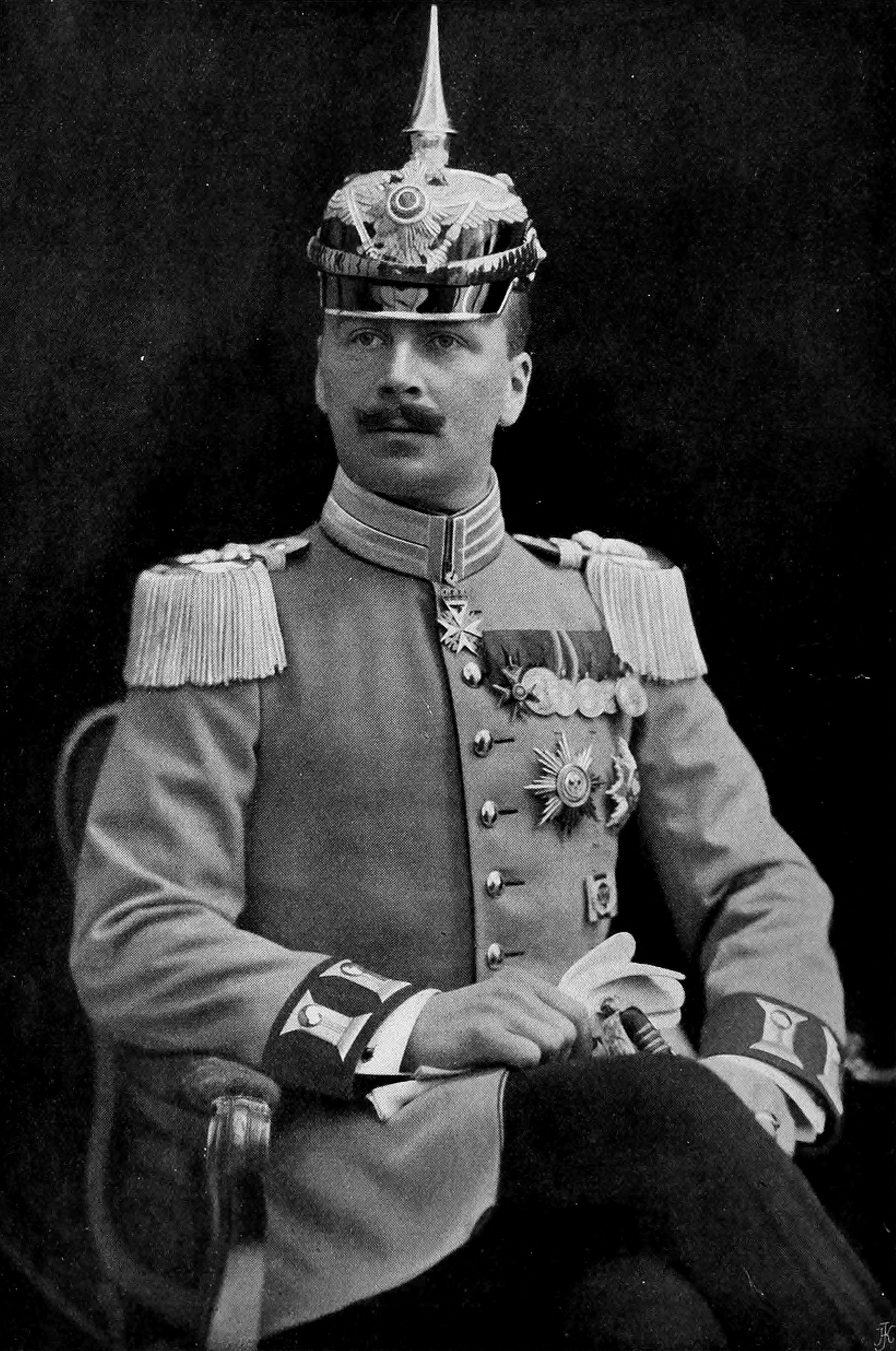
Duke Adolf Friedrich of Mecklenburg

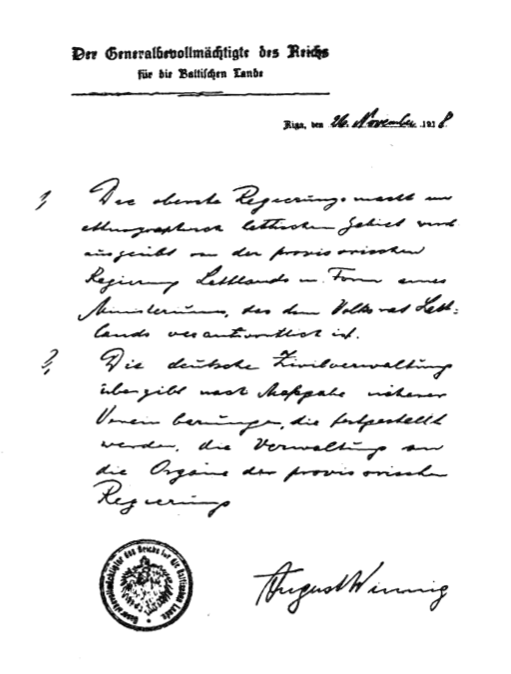
Winnig's note of November 26, 1918

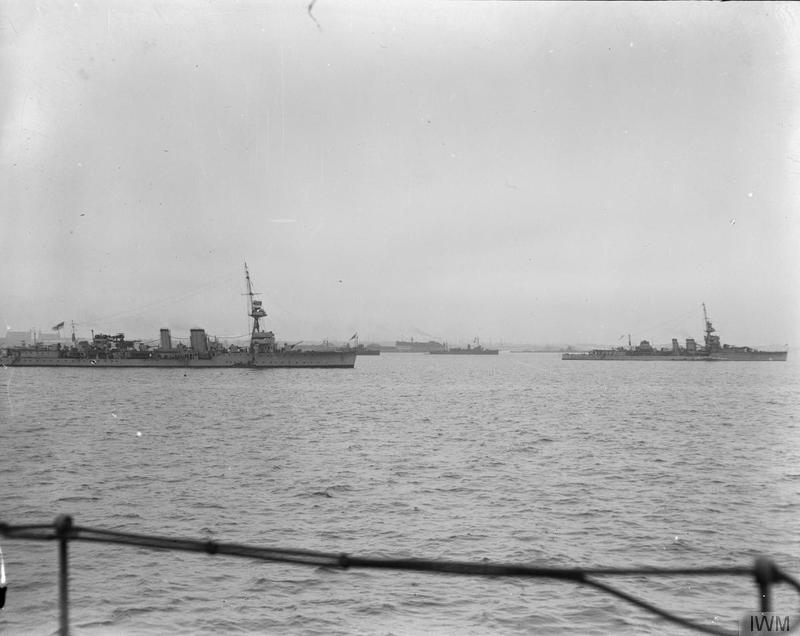
British Navy ships in Liepāja port, December 1918

Soviet offensive, 1918–1919

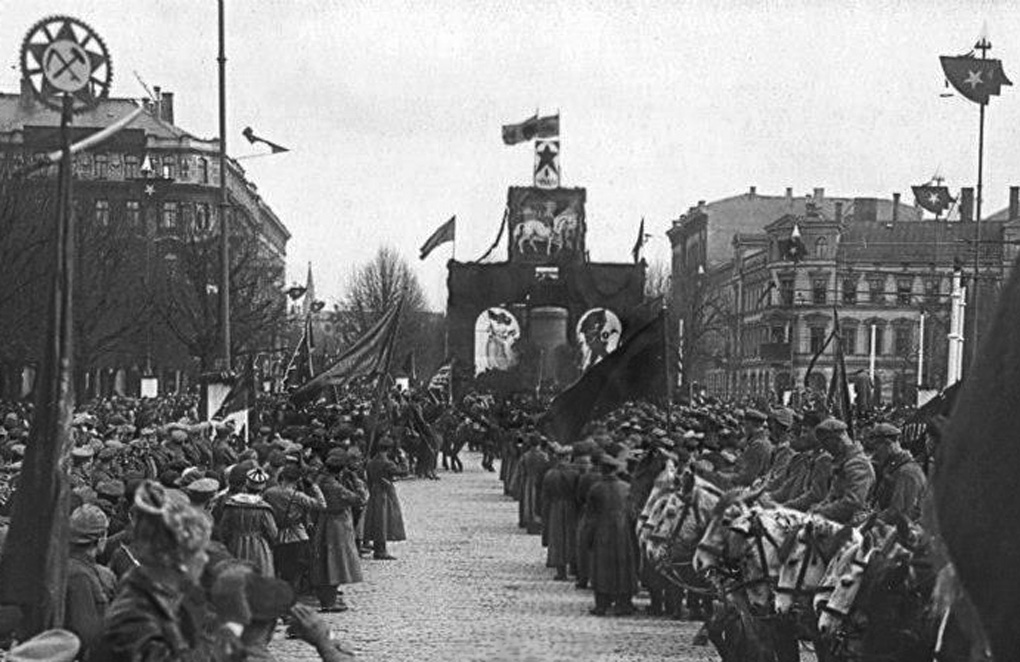
May 1, 1919 celebrations in Soviet Riga

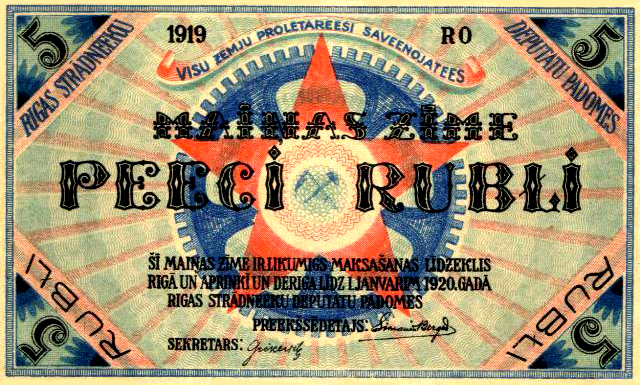
Soviet Latvia's 5 ruble note

Local counteroffensives, 1919–1920

The course of World War I, which directly involved Latvians and Latvian territory, fostered the idea of Latvian statehood. During the summer of 1915 the German army conquered Kurzeme and Zemgale, leading to an exodus of Latvians from these two provinces. Local politicians gained experience organizing refugee relief and Latvian refugee cultural life. Caught between the attacking Germans and incompetent Russians, Latvian riflemen (latviešu strēlnieki) fought on the Russian side during this war and became increasingly radicalized after repeated setbacks under tsarist generals. During the Russian Civil War of 1917–1923 a significant group (known as Red riflemen) fought for the Bolsheviks. Meanwhile, German-Empire and local Baltic Germans planned to annex the ancient Livonian and Estonian lands to the German state. During the chaotic period of Russian and German empire collapses, the February Revolution of March 1917, the Bolshevik revolution of November 1917, the Soviet westward offensive of 1918–1919 and the onset of the Russian Civil War, Latvians made various efforts to establish a local government. Not all of these efforts aimed at establishing an independent state or even a Latvian state.

=== Provisional Land Councils ===
After the February Revolution in the Russian Empire, a majority of Latvians did not expect more for their country than a federated status in a Russian state. "Free Latvia in Free Russia" was the slogan of the day. During March 12–13, 1917 in Valmiera the Vidzeme Land Congress took place, which set up the Provisional Land Council of Vidzeme. Courland was occupied by Germans, who increasingly supported idea of creating a puppet Duchy of Courland and Semigallia in order to annex it to Germany. Latgalian-inhabited counties of the Vitebsk Governorate were demanding unity with other Latvian provinces (unification of Latgalian Latvians and Baltic Latvians), which came only after the Bolshevik revolution.

=== Iskolat ===
On July 5, 1917, the Russian Provisional Government recognized the elected Land councils of Vidzeme and Kurzeme. Encouraged by the liberalism of the Provisional Government, Latvians put forward proposals which envisioned a broad local autonomy. On August 12, 1917, Latvian organizations jointly asked the Provisional Government in Petrograd for autonomy and self-determination. During a Congress from August 11–12 (July 29–30, Old Style) in Riga, the left-wing Social Democrats, heavily influenced by the Bolsheviks, established the Iskolat government – named for the "Executive Committee of the Council of Workers, Soldiers and Landless Deputies of Latvia" (Russian: Исполнительный комитет совета рабочих, солдатских и безземельных депутатов Латвии, romanized: Ispolnitel'nyj komitet rabochikh, soldatskikh i bezzemel'niykh deputatov Latvii).

When the German Army occupied Riga on September 3, 1917, Iskolat retreated to Vidzeme, where it assumed executive powers. The so-called Iskolat Republic existed from November 21, 1917, until March 3, 1918. Under German attacks it evacuated to Cēsis, then to Valka. It disbanded in March 1918 after the Brest-Litovsk treaty of March 3, 1918 assigned the Latvian lands (except Latgale) to Germany.

=== Democratic bloc ===
In German-occupied Riga, after a preliminary meeting on September 14, on September 23, 1917, the Latvian Social Democratic party, together with the Latvian Farmers' Union and some smaller republican and socialist parties, formed the Democratic Bloc, which petitioned Ober Ost for the restoration of an elected Riga City Council, the re-opening of schools, and press freedoms. The Democratic Bloc was not a formal organization, but a coalition of politicians who shared similar political goals.

Latvian Social Democrats used their old contacts with the German Social Democrat Party to directly lobby politicians in Berlin. On October 19, 1918, Democratic Bloc representatives delivered a petition to the German Imperial chancellor Prince Maximilian of Baden, in which they asked for the removal of occupational forces, the release of POWs, and recognition of an independent Latvian state.

=== Latvian National Council ===
In October 1917 centrist politicians met in Petrograd and agreed to create a united council of all Latvian parties, refugee-support organizations and soldiers' committees. On November 29, 1917, the Latvian Provisional National Council was established in Valka. On December 2, 1917, it proclaimed Latvia's autonomy in Latvian-inhabited lands and declared itself the only representative organ of Latvians. The council announced three main goals – convening of a Constitutional Assembly, creation of political autonomy and uniting of all ethnic Latvian-inhabited lands.

The National Council, under the chairmanship of Voldemārs Zāmuēls, sent a delegation – led by the future Minister of Foreign Affairs Zigfrīds Anna Meierovics – to the Allied countries to get their support for an independent Latvia.

The Provisional National Council operated in the same place and at the same time as the Bolshevik-controlled Iskolat – in the small city of Valka, which is situated on the border between ethnic Estonian and ethnic Latvian lands, and which for a couple of months was the virtual capital of the Latvians. Iskolat moved to ban the Provisional Council in December 1917.

On January 5, 1918, during the only meeting of the democratically elected Constituent Assembly of Russia (subsequently dissolved by Bolsheviks), Latvian deputy Jānis Goldmanis, the initiator in 1915 of the formation of the Latvian Riflemen units, read a declaration of separation of Latvia from Russia.

At its second meeting, which took place in Petrograd, the Latvian National Council on January 30, 1918, declared that Latvia should be an independent, democratic republic, uniting the Latvian regions of Kurzeme (which includes Zemgale), Vidzeme and Latgale.

On March 3, 1918 Soviet Russia signed the treaty of Brest-Litovsk with the Central Powers. In terms of the treaty Russia gave up Kurzeme and Vidzeme (but not Latgale). The National Council protested against the splitting of Latvian lands and the annexation of Kurzeme by Germany.

On November 11, 1918, the British Empire recognized the Latvian National Council as a de facto government, confirming a prior verbal communication of October 23 to Zigfrīds Anna Meierovics from the British Minister for Foreign Affairs, A. J. Balfour.

Despite these diplomatic successes, the National Council had a major problem: the Social Democrats and the Democratic Bloc refused to join it. This prevented the creation of a truly national consensus for proclaiming independence. This disunity came to an end only on November 17, 1918, when the People's Council (Tautas padome) was created.

=== United Baltic Duchy ===
On September 22, 1918, German Emperor Wilhelm II proclaimed the Baltic provinces to be free and on November 5 Germans proclaimed a United Baltic Duchy headed by Duke Adolf Friedrich of Mecklenburg. However, this project (just like the similar Kingdom of Lithuania) collapsed together with the German Empire on November 9 and with the Armistice of 11 November 1918.

On November 26, 1918, the new General Plenipotentiary of Germany August Winnig recognized the Latvian Provisional Government which the People's Council had established on November 18. On November 28 the Regency Council of the United Baltic Duchy disbanded itself.

=== People's Council ===
After the German collapse on November 9, the National Council and the Democratic Bloc began unification talks. Social Democrats insisted that the new Latvia should be a socialistic state, which other parties found unacceptable. The Social Democrats also refused to join the National Council, instead insisting on creating a new unity organization. The unification talks were led by Farmers' Union leaders Kārlis Ulmanis and Miķelis Valters, while National Council leaders Voldemārs Zāmuēls, Arveds Bergs and Ādolfs Klīve were sidelined.

On November 17, 1918, competing Latvian factions finally united in the People's Council, which on November 18, 1918, proclaimed the independence of the Republic of Latvia and created the Latvian Provisional Government.

On November 18 Soviet Russia started a westward offensive aimed at regaining Russia's western provinces, and the War of Independence ensued.

The left wing of the Latvian Social Democrats had become allied with the Bolsheviks, and during its conference of November 18–19, 1918 proclaimed the Latvian commune a part of the Russian Soviet Federation.

=== War of Independence ===
On December 1, 1918 Soviet Russia invaded Latvia. Much of the invading army in Latvia consisted of Red Latvian Riflemen, which made the invasion easier. The Soviet offensive met little resistance, coming just a few weeks after the collapse of the German Empire and the proclamation of an independent Latvia. The Social Democratic party at this point decided to leave the People's Council – it rejoined it only in April 1918. On December 17, 1918, the Provisional government of Workers and Peasants, led by the veteran left-wing politician Pēteris Stučka proclaimed Soviet rule. On December 18 Lenin officially recognized the new Soviet Latvia.

The Soviet Army captured Riga on January 3, 1919. By the end of January the Provisional Government and the remaining German units had retreated all the way to Liepāja, but then the Red offensive stalled along the Venta river. The Latvian Socialist Soviet Republic was officially proclaimed on January 13 with the political, economic, and military backing of Soviet Russia. Stučka established a radical communist régime of nationalizations, expropriations and executions of class enemies. Revolutionary tribunals were established, condemning to death German nobles, pastors, and wealthy traders – as well as peasants who refused to surrender their grain: in total some 1000 people were executed. Due to food-supply disruptions, 8590 people starved to death in Riga.

On March 3, 1919 German and Latvian forces commenced a counterattack against the forces of Soviet Latvia. On April 16 the Baltic nobility organized a coup d'état in Liepāja and a puppet government under the leadership of Andrievs Niedra (in office from 26 April 1919) was established – it lasted for just two months. The provisional national government took refuge aboard the steamship Saratov under British protection in Liepaja harbour. On May 22, 1919, the German Freikorps under the overall command of the German Major-General Rüdiger von der Goltz recaptured Riga, and the White Terror against any suspected Soviet sympathizers began. At the same time the Estonian Army (including the North Latvian Brigade loyal to the Latvian Provisional Government headed by Ulmanis) started a major offensive against the Soviets in north Latvia. By the middle of June Soviet rule was reduced to Latgale.

In June 1919 collisions started between the Baltische Landeswehr on one side and the Estonian 3rd division (including the 2nd Cēsis regiment of the North Latvian brigade) on the other. The 3rd division defeated the German forces in the Battle of Wenden on June 23. An armistice was signed at Strazdumuiža, under the terms of which the Germans had to leave Latvia.

Instead the German forces were incorporated into the West Russian Volunteer Army. On October 5 it commenced an offensive on Riga, taking the west bank of the Daugava River – the front line split Riga in half. On November 11 the Latvian counteroffensive began and by the end of the month the West Russian Volunteer Army was driven from Latvia. During battles in Riga, Latvian forces were supported by British naval artillery.

On January 3, 1920, the united Latvian and Polish forces launched an attack on the Soviet army in Latgale, and in the Battle of Daugavpils liberated Daugavpils by January 5. By the end of January they reached the ethnographic border of Latvia, and peace negotiations with the Soviets soon began.

=== Peace and international recognition ===
During the 1919 Paris Peace conference Latvia had unsuccessfully lobbied for international de jure recognition of its independence by the Allied countries. The Allies still hoped for a quick end of the Bolshevik regime in Moscow and the establishment of a democratic Russian state which would grant Latvia a large degree of autonomy. The internal situation also was unstable, as during 1919 three different governments (Latvians, Germans-White Russians, and Soviets) were fighting for control.

According to Latvian diplomats, during that time the US and France opposed recognizing Latvia; Italy and Japan supported the idea; while the United Kingdom gave limited support and waited for events to play out.

On August 11, 1920, according to the terms of the Latvian–Soviet Peace Treaty, Soviet Russia relinquished authority over the Latvian nation and its claims to Latvian territory:

"Russia recognizes without objection the independence and sovereignty of the Latvian State and forever renounces all sovereign rights held by Russia in relation to the Latvian nation and land on the basis of the previous State legal regime as well as any international agreements, all of which lose their force and effect for all future time as herein provided. The Latvian nation and land shall have no obligations arising from their previous possession by Russia."

In 1920 Latvia, together with Lithuania and Estonia, applied to join the League of Nations but was denied membership at that time.

As the Soviet victory in the Russian Civil War became clear and after heavy lobbying by the Latvian Foreign Minister Zigfrīds Anna Meierovics, the Allied Supreme War Council, which included United Kingdom, France, Belgium, Italy and Japan, recognized Latvia's independence on January 26, 1921. Recognition from many other countries soon followed. Latvia became a member of the League of Nations on September 22, 1921. The US recognized Latvia only in July 1922. Before 1940, a total of 42 countries recognized Latvia.

== Parliamentary era, 1920–1934 ==
After Latgale was finally liberated from the Soviets in January 1920, elections to the Constitutional Assembly of Latvia took place on April 17–18, 1920. While the population of Latvia had fallen by almost a million, from 2,552,000 to 1,596,000 in 1920 (in Riga from 520,000 to 225,000), 50 party-lists and candidates competed for 150 seats. Close to 85% of eligible voters participated in the elections, and 16 parties were elected. The Social Democratic Workers' Party won 57 seats, the Farmers' Union 26, and the Latgalian Peasant Party 17. This voting pattern marked all the future parliaments – a high number of parties representing small interest-groups required the formation of unstable coalition governments. While the largest single party, the Social Democrats, held the post of Speaker of the Saeima, they avoided participating in governments. Between 1922 and 1934 Latvia had 13 governments and 9 Prime Ministers.

On February 15, 1922, the Constitution of Latvia and in June the new Law on Elections were passed, opening the way to electing the parliament – the Saeima.

During the parliamentary era, four national elections took place, which elected the 1st Saeima (1922–1925), 2nd Saeima (1925–1928), 3rd Saeima (1928–1931), and 4th Saeima (1931–1934). Three State Presidents were elected – Jānis Čakste (1922–1927), who died in office; Gustavs Zemgals (1927–1930), who refused to stand for re-election; and Alberts Kviesis (1930–1936), who accepted the May 15 coup d'état.

=== Border conflicts ===
==== Eastern ====
The Latvian–Soviet peace treaty had set the eastern border between Latvia and Soviet Russia. After 1944 the Soviet Union annexed parts of Abrene District as the Pytalovsky District of the RSFSR. Latvia gave up all legal claims to these lands in 2007.

==== Northern ====
During 1919 Estonia had provided military assistance to Latvia on the condition that some of its territorial claims in Vidzeme would be met. The Latvians refused, and Estonia withdrew its support. Estonian claims centered on Valka district as well as territories in Ape, Veclaicene, Ipiķi and Lode. On March 22, 1920, Estonia and Latvia agreed to a settlement commission led by British colonel Stephen Tallents. Latvia retained Ainaži parish, and most of other contested lands, but lost most of Valka city (now Valga, Estonia). The issue of the ethnically Swedish-inhabited Ruhnu island in the Gulf of Riga was left for both countries to decide. Latvia finally renounced all claims on Ruhnu island after signing a military alliance with Estonia on November 1, 1923.

==== Southern ====
Latvia proposed to retain the southern border of the former Courland governorate with Lithuania unchanged, but the Lithuanians wanted to gain access to the sea, as at this time they did not control the German lands of Klaipėda. In September 1919, during an attack against the Soviets, the Lithuanian army occupied much of Ilūkste Municipality and threatened to take Daugavpils as well. Between late August and early September 1920 the Latvian army pushed the Lithuanians out. The Lithuanians, weakened by Żeligowski's Mutiny of October 1920, did not escalate this confrontation. On September 25, 1920, Latvia and Lithuania agreed to have an international arbitration committee led by James Young Simpson settle this dispute. In March 1921, Lithuania was given the port town Palanga, the village of Šventoji, parts of Rucava Municipality and the railroad junction of Mažeikiai on Riga–Jelgava–Liepāja railroad line, which meant that Latvia had to build a new railway line. Latvia received the town of Aknīste and some smaller territories in the Aknīste Municipality, Ukri parish and Bauska Municipality. Latvia gave up 283,3 square km, while receiving 290 km^{2}. About 16 to 20 thousand ethnic Latvians thus became Lithuanian citizens.

As a result of the Polish–Soviet War of 1918–1921, Poland secured a 105 km long border with Latvia. In July 1919 Poland announced its annexation of all lands south of Daugavpils and their inclusion in Braslaw district. Latvia could not complain, as it still needed Polish military help prior to the decisive Battle of Daugavpils of January 1920 against the Soviets. The issue was solved by a renewed Soviet attack against Poland, and later, by Polish-Lithuanian conflict over Vilnius. During the Soviet attack in July 1920, Polish forces retreated from this area, which Latvian forces then occupied. After Żeligowski's Mutiny Poland wanted to have good diplomatic relations with Latvia and did not raise any serious territorial claims. The issue was solved in February 1929, when Latvia and Poland signed a trade treaty which included a secret agreement about compensation to Polish landowners for lost properties. By 1937 Latvia had paid the full amount of 5 million golden lats. Over some protests from Lithuania, the Latvian-Polish border was demarcated between 1933 and 1938.

=== Foreign relations ===
Independent Latvia's earliest foreign-policy goals involved securing peace with Soviet Russia and with Germany, gaining international recognition, and joining the League of Nations. All this was achieved by the efforts of Zigfrīds Anna Meierovics.

Hopes for the union of Baltic countries – Poland, Lithuania, Latvia, Estonia, and Finland – faded after 1922. After that Latvia was the most energetic proponent of Baltic unity and Baltic Entente. On November 1, 1923, Latvia and Estonia signed a military alliance, followed by trade agreements. Latvia tried to maintain good relations with the regional hegemons – Soviet Russia and Germany – and hoped for more support from Great Britain. Foreign governments opened 21 embassies and 45 consulates in Latvia by 1928; some of these consulates were located in the port cities Liepāja and Ventspils.

Latvia purchased embassy buildings in Berlin (1922), Tallinn, Warsaw (1923), London (1925), Paris (1927), and Geneva (1938).

=== Politics ===
The Social Democratic Workers' Party, as the largest party, held the position of the Speaker of the Saeima in all the interwar Saeimas. The 1st Saeima was chaired by Frīdrihs Veismanis, the Second, Third and Fourth Saeimas were chaired by Pauls Kalniņš. The refusal of the Social Democrats to participate in governments (except twice in short-lived cabinets) meant that government was usually led by the center-right Farmers' Union, or by a coalition of smaller parties, as the Saeima seats were divided among many parties, each with just a few MPs.

The Social Democrats were split between the main Social Democratic Workers' Party led by Pauls Kalniņš, Ansis Rudevics and Fricis Menders (which first won 30 seats but had a tendency to lose votes in subsequent elections) and the splinter Social Democrat Minority Party led by Marģers Skujenieks, who were more centrist and managed even to lead governments on two occasions. The mainstream Social Democrat party maintained a strong policy of Socialist International ideals and criticized the existing capitalist system. The Party avoided using the State flag and singing the National anthem, instead using the Red flag and singing the "Internationale" in their meetings. Their popularity increasingly fell, and in the 4th Saeima they had only 21 seats.

Officially banned, the Communist Party of Latvia in the 1928 elections managed to get 5 seats standing as the Left Trade Union (which was banned in 1930). In the 1931 elections Communists won 6 seats as the Trade Union Workers and Peasants Group, but were once again banned in 1933.

The Latvian Farmers' Union, comprising the second-largest parliamentary faction with 14 to 17 MPs, was the largest of the conservative parties. It increasingly had to compete with some smaller farmer, catholic-farmer and Latgale-farmer parties which won more votes in each election. The Farmer's Union was led by Kārlis Ulmanis, Zigfrīds Anna Meierovics and Hugo Celmiņš. The decreasing popularity of Ulmanis and of the Farmers' Union may have been one of the reasons behind the May 15, 1934 Latvian coup d'état, as Ulmanis tried to prevent further loss of his political influence and power in the elections scheduled for October 1934.

The Democratic Centre Party, led by Gustavs Zemgals represented mostly urban, middle-class office-workers and state employees.

The National Union, led by Arveds Bergs, was nationalistic, anti-Soviet, center-right party that attracted urban followers. The extreme nationalists were represented by the antisemitic Pērkonkrusts (founded in 1933), led by Gustavs Celmiņš.

Most of the remaining small parties were either ethnic – German, Jewish, or Polish – or represented single-issue economic groups – small-holders, house owners, even railroad workers. The small parties usually formed larger coalitions (blocks) and then used their influence to join governing coalition. One of the most influential was coalition of Latgale parties.

=== Referendums ===
During this time four referendums took place, all indicative of the issues facing the new state.

On July 19, 1922, Latvia signed a Concordat with the Vatican. This was motivated by the need to better integrate the heavily Catholic Latgale in the Lutheran-dominated state. In traditionally Lutheran Riga some buildings belonging to Russian Orthodox Church were given to Catholics, and the Lutheran St. James's Cathedral was transferred to Catholics as their new cathedral. On September 1–2, 1923 the Church property referendum was held in an attempt to prevent any further forcible transfer of churches and properties from one confession to another. About 200,000 or 20% of voters participated, and the referendum failed.

On June 2, 1927, the Saeima once again changed the Citizenship law. An earlier version had granted Latvian citizenship to anyone who had lived in Latvia for 20 years before August 1, 1914 (at the start of World War I). The new law shortened the period of eligibility to 6 months before August 1, 1914. This mainly aimed to allow many Latvian farming colonists, who now were fleeing Soviet Russia, to receive citizenship. However, this also meant that many Soviet Jews now could claim Latvian citizenship. On December 17–18, 1927 the Latvian citizenship referendum was held to prevent the proposed changes, but it failed, as only 250,000 or 20% of voters participated.

The Concordat with the Vatican occasioned another church-property referendum in 1931. When the St. James's Cathedral was given to Catholics, Latvian Lutherans lost their bishop's cathedral and were sharing the Riga Cathedral with the Baltic German congregation, which belonged to the autonomous German Lutheran confession. Anti-German sentiment was widespread and an initiative to give Riga Cathedral to Latvian Lutherans gained strength. On September 5–6, 1931 almost 400,000 voters supported this idea, but the referendum failed, as it did not gather over 50% of votes. In any case, the Saeima soon passed a law confiscating the church from the Germans and giving it to the Latvians.

On February 24–25, 1934 the Insurance Law referendum took place, aiming to introduce a new old-age- and unemployment-benefit scheme which would be funded by taxing employers, higher-wage earners and municipalities. The referendum was initiated by Social Democrats, who managed to get over 400,000 votes for this idea, but the referendum failed.

=== Economy ===
The young Latvian state had to deal with two main economic issues: the restoration of industrial plants (especially in Riga), and the implementation of land reform that would transfer most of the land from German nobles to Latvian farmers.

The Constituent Assembly passed a land-reform law which expropriated manor lands. Landowners were left with 50 hectares each, and their land was distributed to the landless peasants without cost. In 1897, 61.2% of the rural population had been landless; by 1936, that percentage had reduced to 18%. The extent of cultivated land surpassed the pre-war level as early as 1923.

Before the World War I some 2% of landowners owned 53% of land in Kurzeme and Vidzeme, in Latgale it was 38%. The Agrarian reform Law of September 16, 1920 created the State Land Fund, which took over 61% of all land. The German nobles were left with no more than 50 ha of land. This destroyed their manor-house system. Many of them sold their possessions and left for Germany. Former manor-house buildings often became local schools, administrative buildings or hospitals. The land was distributed to a new class of small-holding farmers – over 54,000 Jaunsaimnieki (New farmers) with an average farm-size of 17.1 ha, who usually had to establish their farms from nothing, in the process building new houses and clearing fields. Due to their small size of their holdings and unfavorable grain-prices, the new farmers rapidly developed dairy farming. Butter, bacon and eggs became new export industries. Flax and state-owned forests were other export-revenue sources.

On March 27, 1919, the Latvian Provisional Government introduced the Latvian ruble, with an exchange rate of 1 Latvian ruble equal to 1 Ostrubel, 2 German marks and 1.5 tsarist ruble. On March 18, 1920, the Latvian ruble became the only legal currency. Due to high inflation, the new Latvian lats was introduced in 1922 at a rate of one lats to 50 rubles. In 1923 the Bank of Latvia was established and the lats replaced the ruble entirely in 1925.

Between 1923 and 1930 the state budget ran surpluses. On average, 25.5% went to defense, 11.2% to education and 23.4% to capital-investment projects. The state's spirits monopoly generated around 15% of government income.

The restoration of industry proved complicated. Before World War I, 80% of industrial production went to internal (Russian Empire) markets. Latvia signed a trade agreement with the Soviet Union in 1927, but this did not result in high trade-volumes. By the end of the 1920s Latvia's largest export markets were Germany (35.6%), the United Kingdom (20.8%), France, Belgium, Netherlands (22.9%). Latvia had to import almost all its modern machinery and fuels.

In 1929 Latvia had three state-owned banks, 19 private banks, 605 credit unions and many more mutual credit unions.

The Great Depression reached Latvia in the middle of 1930. Exports fell and imports were strictly limited, to save foreign exchange reserves. State monopolies of sugar and bacon were created. To prevent banks from collapse, between July 31, 1931, and September 1, 1933, a law prohibited withdrawal of more than 5% of the total deposit per week. In 1932 the trade agreement with Soviet Union expired and industrial unemployment reached its peak in January 1932. The national income fell from 600 lats per capita in 1930 to 390 lats per capita in 1932.

In place of free international trade came interstate clearing-agreements which set the volumes and types of goods that states then would trade. In 1932 Latvia signed clearing agreements with France and Germany, in 1934 with the United Kingdom, in 1935 with Sweden, Estonia and Lithuania.

Economic recovery started in 1933 as production increased by some 30%. The state budget deficit fell from the record 24.2 million lats in 1931/32 to 7.8 million lats in the 1933/34 budget.

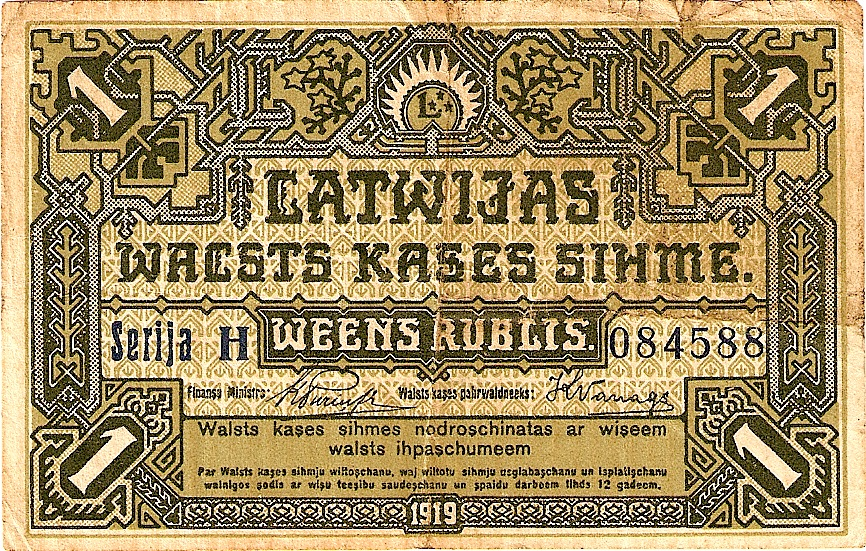
1 ruble note

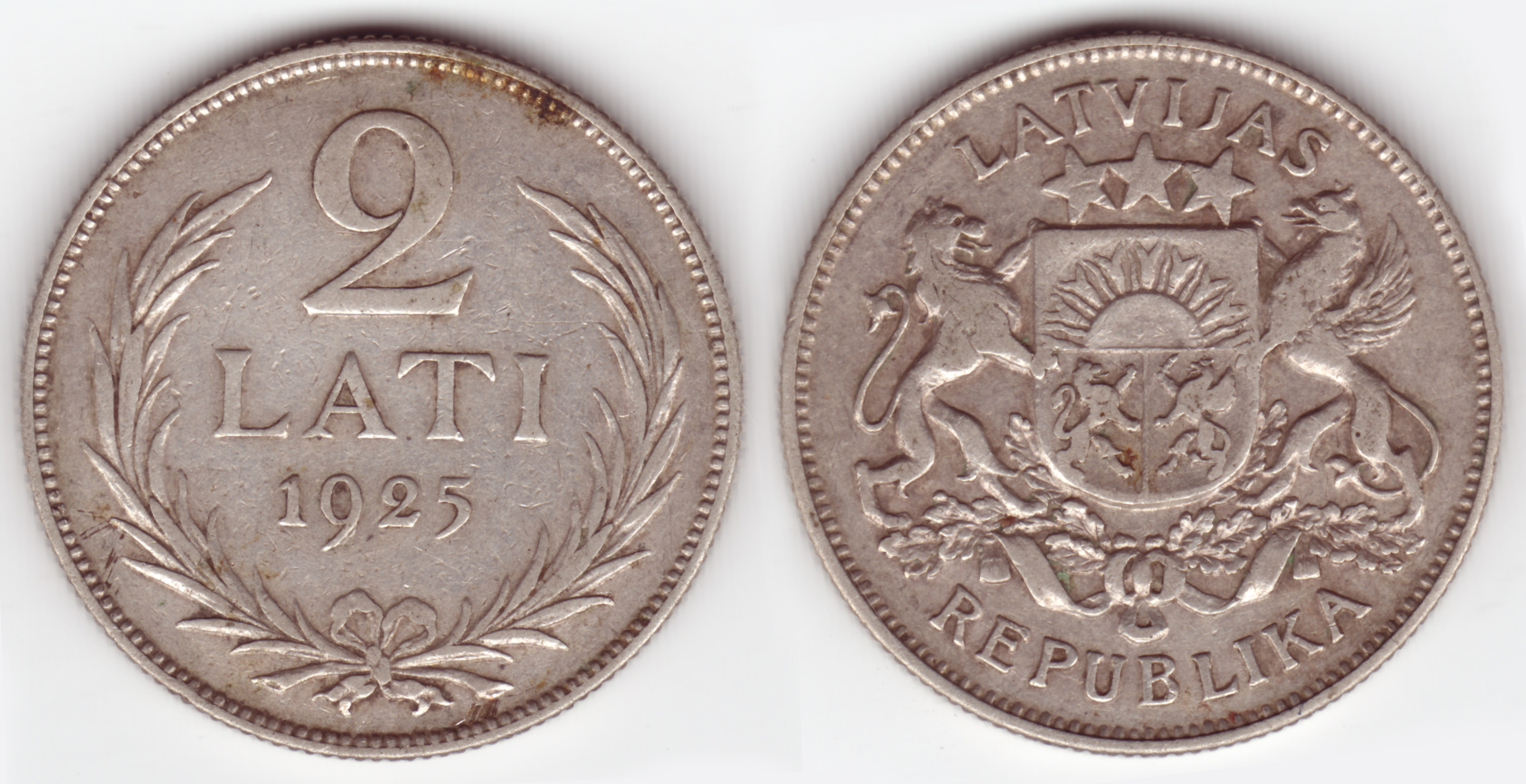
2 lats coin

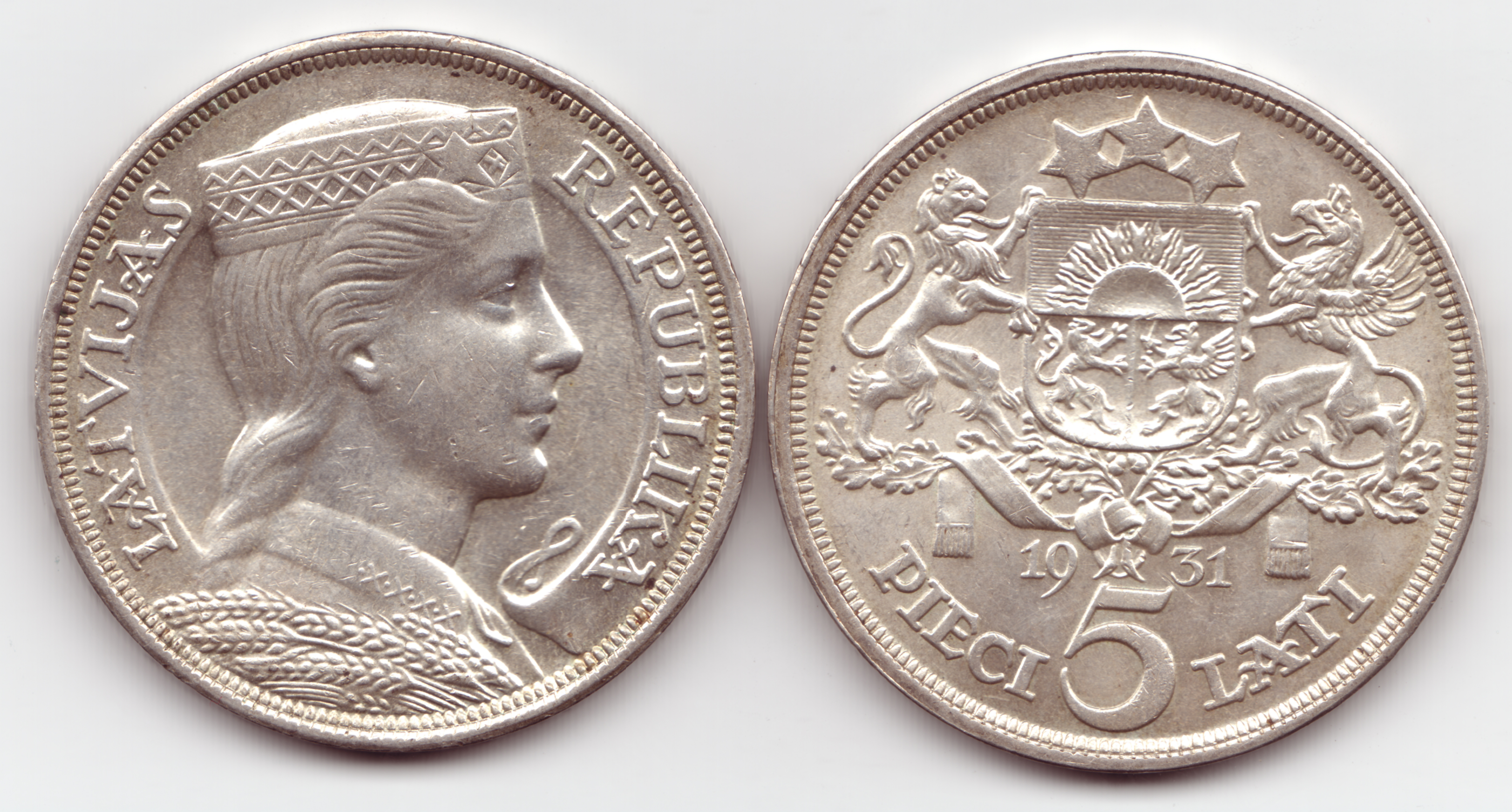
The iconic design of 5 lats coin still used in Latvian euro coins

== Ulmanis dictatorship, 1934–40 ==
On the night from May 15 to 16, 1934 the Prime Minister Kārlis Ulmanis and Minister of War Jānis Balodis, fathers of Latvian independence, took power by a bloodless coup d'état. Parliament and Constitution were suspended, State of War introduced, all political parties banned and press censorship established. Members of the Pērkonkrusts, Latvian Social Democratic Workers' Party, pro-Nazi activists from the Baltic German community, and other leaders from the extreme right and left were detained. Certain extremist political figures such as Gustavs Celmiņš were sentenced to imprisonment.

=== Economy ===
Just as in politics, in economy, the new Ulmanis regime was very active in increasing state control and planning mechanisms. In 1934 regime created the Chamber of Trade and Industry was established, followed by the Chamber of Agriculture and the Chamber of Artisans in 1935 and the Chamber of Labour in 1936. The state helped bankrupt farmers by postponing bankruptcy auctions and refinanced their debt at a lower rate. On May 29, 1934, the state took control over cooperative societies and associations. The dairy industry was placed under the control of the Central Union of Dairy Farmers.

On April 9, 1935, a state controlled Credit Bank of Latvia was created which reduced the role of foreign capital by creating many state owned industry monopolies and joint stock companies. Buyouts and liquidations of foreign, Baltic German and Jewish owned companies become a norm. In place of many competing companies large state owned companies were created. In 1939 the state owned 38 such companies. The new JSC Vairogs produced railway carriages and Ford-Vairogs automobiles under the Ford licence. VEF made world's smallest Minox cameras and such experimental aircraft as VEF JDA-10M, VEF I-12 and others. Between 1936 and 1939 the Ķegums Hydroelectric Power Station, with 70,000 kWh capacity largest in the Baltics, was built by Swedish companies.

After Western countries abandoned the gold standard, the Latvian lats was pegged to the British pound in September 1936. It was a devaluation that further strengthened Latvian exports. By 1939, following an export boom propelled primarily by agricultural goods, Latvia was the richest of the Baltic countries, and had a GDP per capita higher than Italy.

However, the recovery from the Great Depression took almost ten years. National income was 444 lats per capita in 1933 and reached 637 lats per capita in 1938, thus finally overtaking the 1929 levels.

After the start of World War II Latvia declared complete neutrality, but it was now completely cut off from the market of United Kingdom, as Germany had sealed off the Baltic sea. Austerity was introduced on September 3, 1939. The politically disastrous October 5, 1939 Soviet–Latvian Mutual Assistance Treaty provided new export and import opportunities. On October 18, 1939, a new trade agreement was signed with the Soviet Union. Latvia exported its food products in return receiving oil, fuel and chemicals. On December 15, 1939, a new trade agreement was also signed with the Nazi Germany.

Latvian farmers had traditionally relied on seasonal farmworkers from Poland. This was now cut off by the war, and in spring 1940 new regulations introduced compulsory work service for state employees, students and school pupils.

=== Foreign relations ===
In October 1936 Latvia was elected as non-permanent member of the Council of the League of Nations and retained this place for three years. In 1935 embassy in Washington was re-opened, which later served as important center for Latvian Diplomatic Service during 50 years of Soviet occupation.

After the Munich Agreement demonstrated the failure of collective security system, Latvia on December 13, 1938, proclaimed absolute neutrality. On March 28, 1939, Soviet Union without any discussions announced that it is interested in maintaining and defending Latvia's independence. On June 7, 1939, Latvia and Germany signed non-aggression treaty.

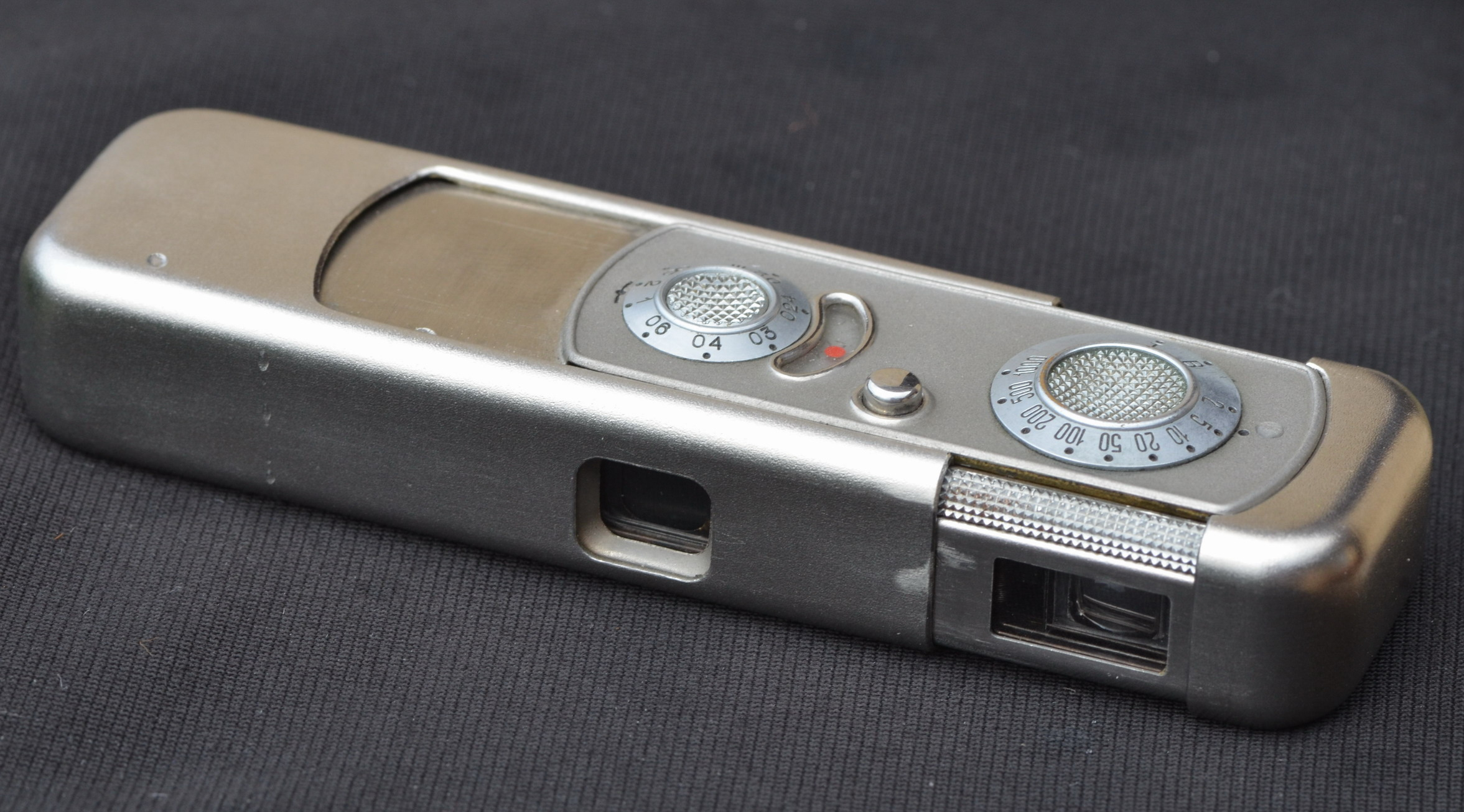
Minox camera, world's smallest

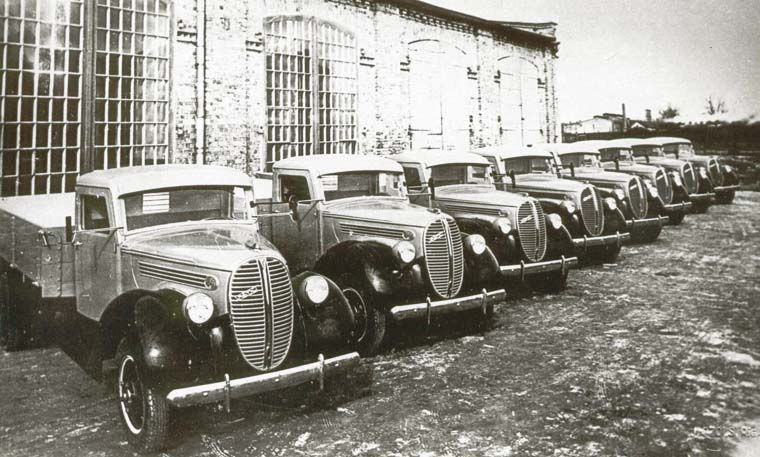
Ford-Vairogs trucks

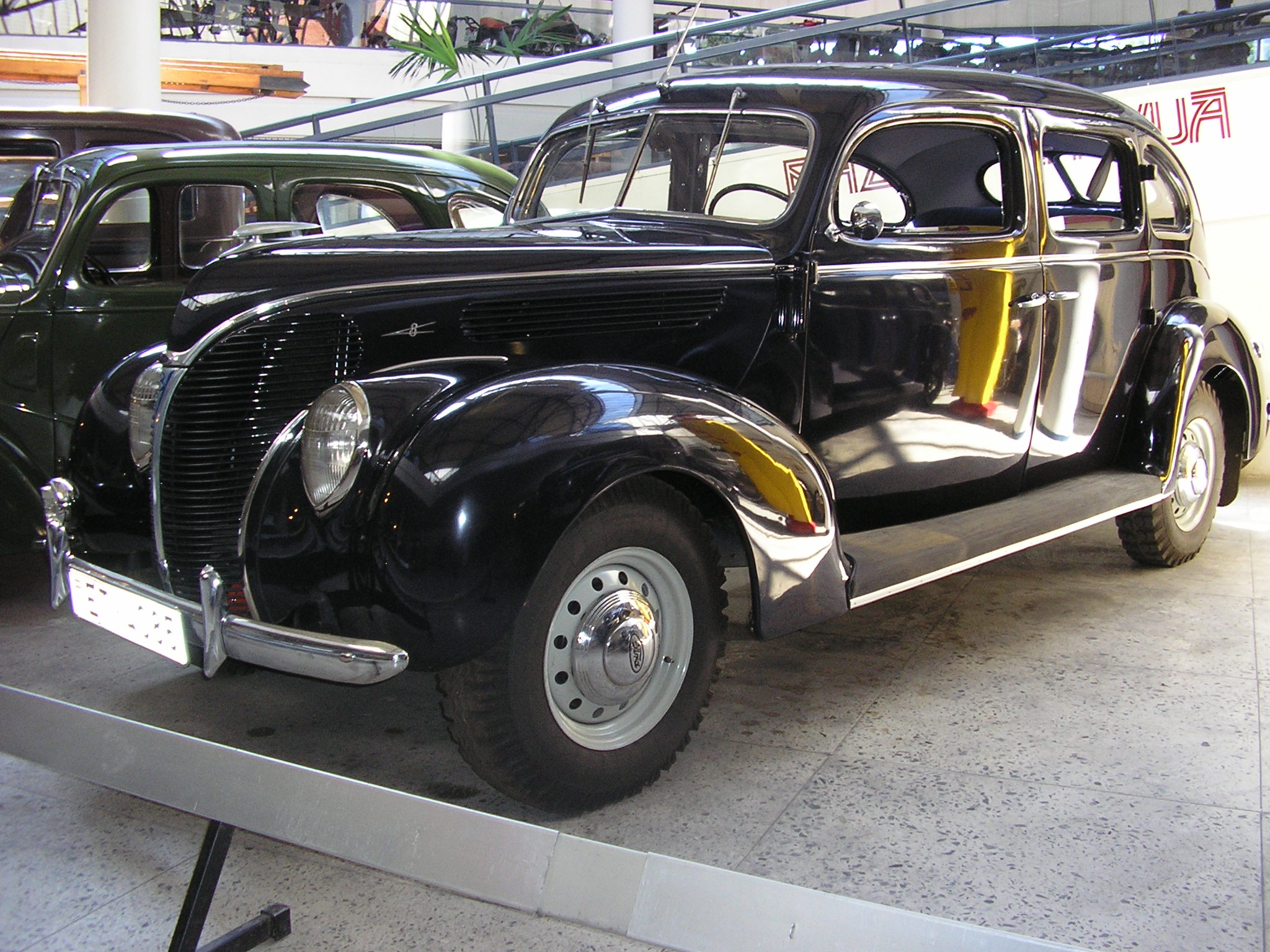
Ford-Vairogs V8

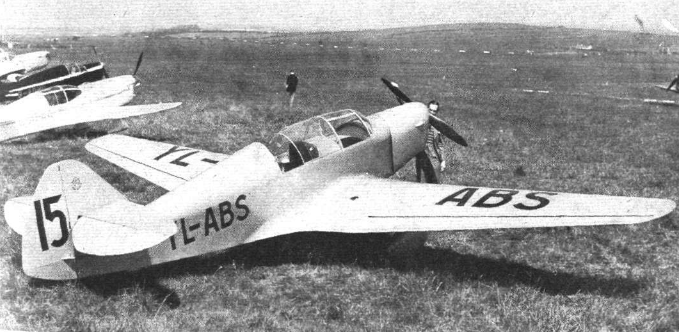
VEF I-12

Ķegums Hydroelectric Power Station

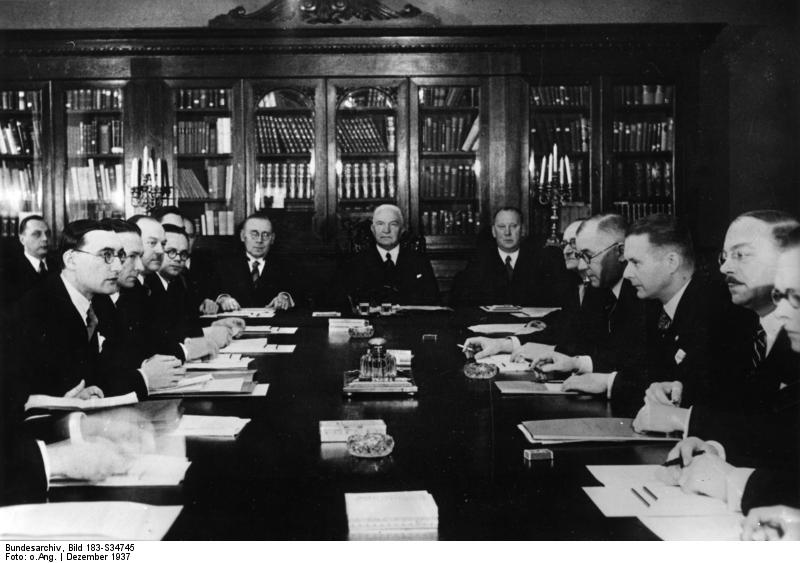
Baltic Entente meeting, 1937

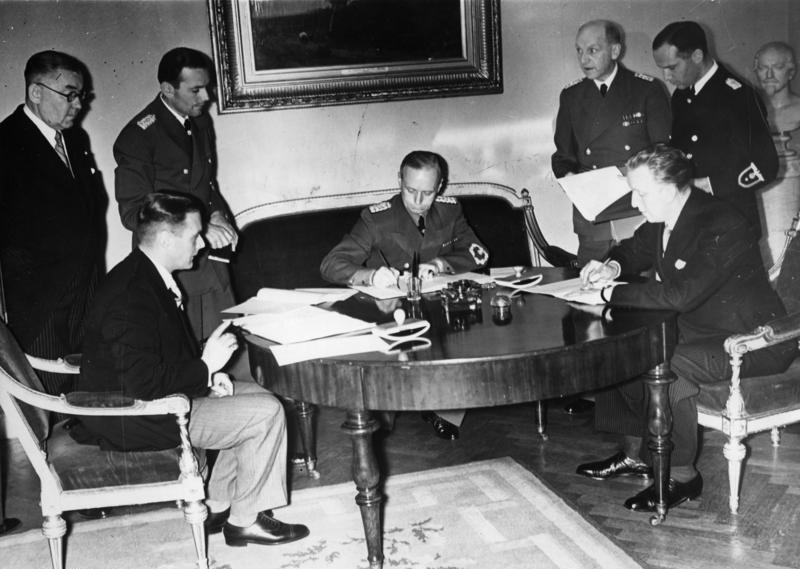
Latvian, German and Estonian ministers sign non-aggression treaties, 1939

== World War II ==
=== First Soviet occupation (1940–1941) ===
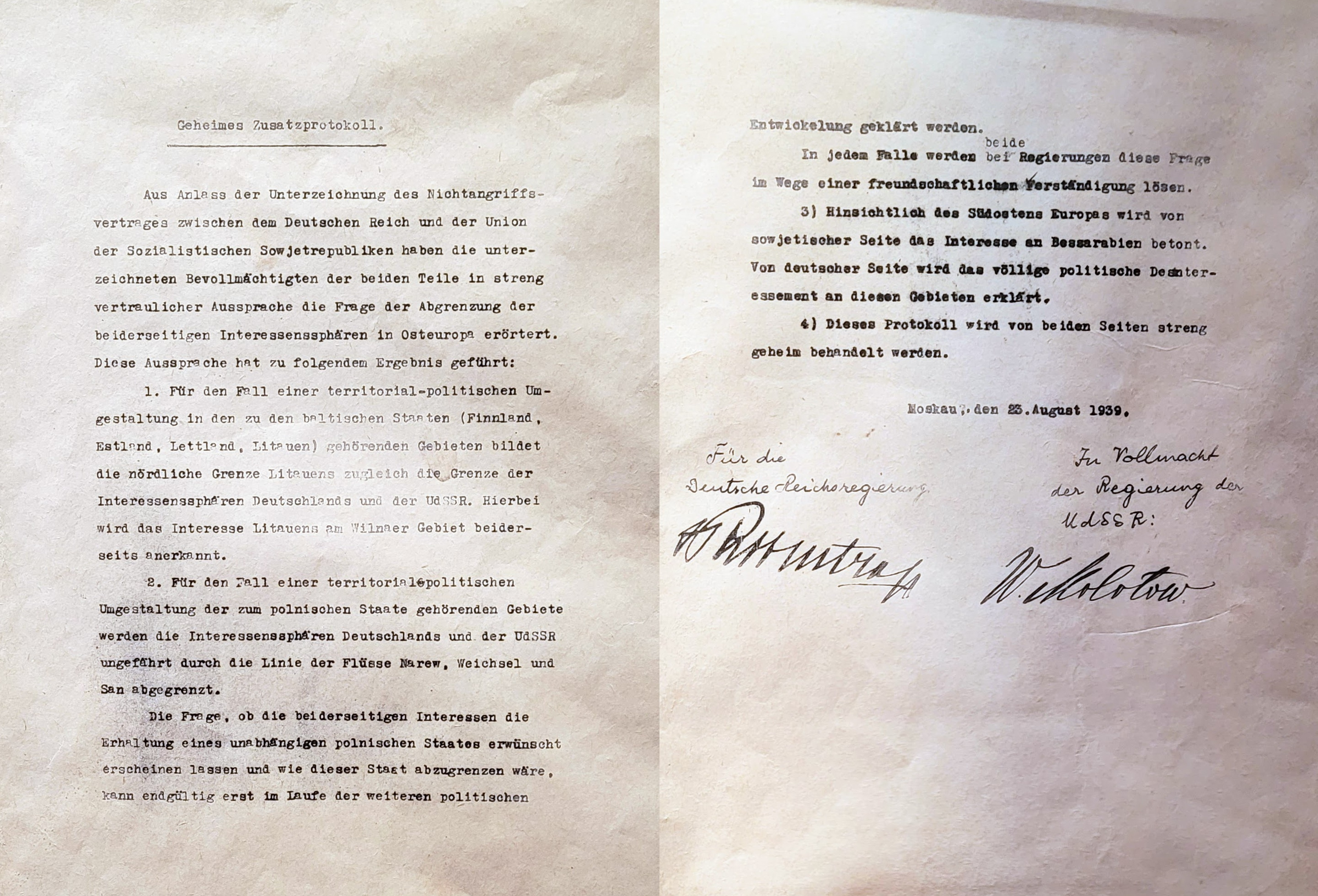
According to the 1939 Molotov–Ribbentrop Pact "the Baltic States (Finland, Estonia, Latvia, Lithuania)" were divided into German and Soviet "spheres of influence" (German copy)

The Soviet Union prepared for Soviet annexation of Baltic countries with the signing of the Molotov–Ribbentrop Pact between the Soviet Union and Nazi Germany on August 23, 1939. Under threat of invasion, (Note: Soviet-Latvian negotiations started on October 2, 1939 and on the following day Latvia's Minister of Foreign Affairs Vilhelms Munters informed his government that Josif Stalin had said that "as for the Germans, [there is no obstacle], we can occupy you" and threatened that the USSR could also seize "territory with a Russian minority.") Latvia (along with Estonia and Lithuania) signed the Soviet–Latvian Mutual Assistance Treaty with Soviet Union, providing for the stationing of up to 25,000 Soviet troops on Latvian soil. Following the initiative from Nazi Germany, Latvia on October 30, 1939, concluded an agreement to "repatriate" ethnic Germans, most of whom had lived in the region for generations, in the wake of the impending Soviet takeover.

Seven months later, the Soviet foreign minister Vyacheslav Molotov accused the Baltic states of conspiracy against the Soviet Union. On June 16, 1940, threatening an invasion, (Note: and presenting the ultimatum and accusations of violation by Latvia of the terms of mutual assistance treaty of 1939, Molotov issued an overt threat to "take action" to secure compliance with the terms of ultimatum – see report of Latvian Chargé d'affaires, Fricis Kociņš, regarding the talks with soviet Foreign Commissar Molotov.) Soviet Union issued an ultimatum demanding that the government be replaced and that an unlimited number of Soviet troops be admitted. Knowing that the Red Army had entered Lithuania a day before, that its troops were massed along the eastern border and mindful of the Soviet military bases in Western Latvia, the government acceded to the demands, and Soviet troops occupied the country on June 17. Staged elections were held July 14–15, 1940, and the results were announced in Moscow 12 hours before the polls closed; Soviet documents show the election results were forged. The newly elected "People's Assembly" declared Latvia a Socialist Soviet Republic and applied for admission into the Soviet Union on July 21. Latvia was incorporated into the Soviet Union on August 5, 1940. Latvian diplomatic service continued to function in exile while the republic was under the Soviet control.

In the spring of 1941, the Soviet central government began planning the mass deportation of anti-Soviet elements from the occupied Baltic states. In preparation, General Ivan Serov, Deputy People's Commissar of Public Security of the Soviet Union, signed the Serov Instructions, "Regarding the Procedure for Carrying out the Deportation of Anti-Soviet Elements from Lithuania, Latvia, and Estonia." During the night of June 13–14, 1941, 15,424 inhabitants of Latvia — including 1,771 Jews and 742 ethnic Russians — were deported to camps and special settlements, mostly in Siberia. 35,000 people were deported in the first year of Soviet occupation (131,500 across the Baltics).

=== Occupation of Latvia by Nazi Germany (1941–1944) ===
The Nazi invasion, launched a week later, cut short immediate plans to deport several hundred thousand more from the Baltics. Nazi troops occupied Riga on July 1, 1941. Immediately after the installation of German authority, a process of eliminating the Jewish and Gypsy population began, with many killings taking place in Rumbula. The killings were committed by the Einsatzgruppe A, the Wehrmacht and Marines (in Liepāja), as well as by Latvian collaborators, including the 500–1500 members of the infamous Arajs Commando (which alone killed around 26,000 Jews) and the 2000 or more Latvian members of the SD. By the end of 1941 almost the entire Jewish population was killed or placed in the concentration camps. In addition, some 25,000 Jews were brought from Germany, Austria and the present-day Czech Republic, of whom around 20,000 were killed. The Holocaust claimed approximately 85,000 lives in Latvia, the vast majority of whom were Jews.

A large number of Latvians resisted the German occupation. The resistance movement was divided between the pro-independence units under the Latvian Central Council and the pro-Soviet units under the Latvian Partisan Movement Headquarters (Латвийский штаб партизанского движения) in Moscow. Their Latvian commander was Arturs Sproģis. The Nazis planned to Germanise the Baltics after the war. In 1943 and 1944 two divisions of Waffen-SS were formed from Latvian conscripts and volunteers to help Germany against the Red Army.

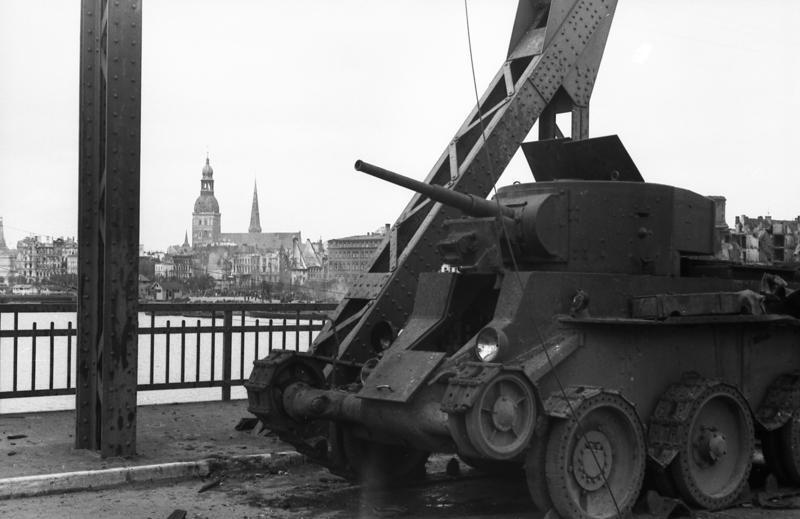
Damaged Soviet tank in Riga

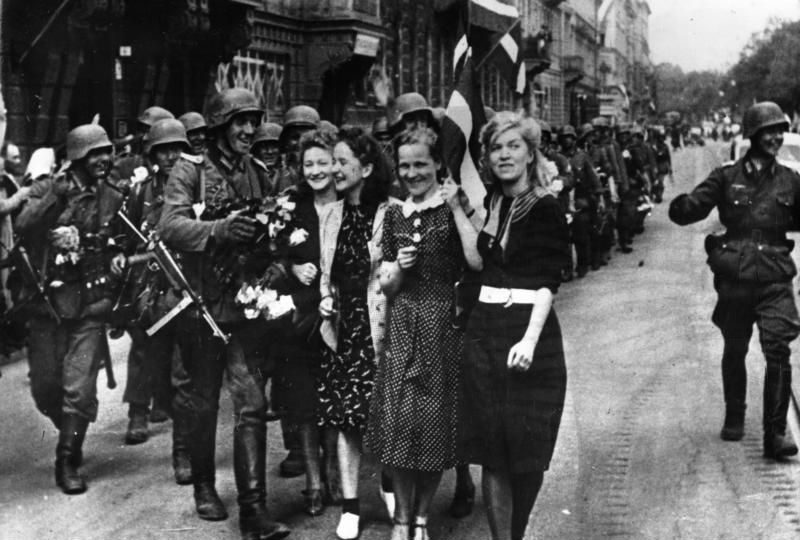
Women greeting German soldiers in Riga

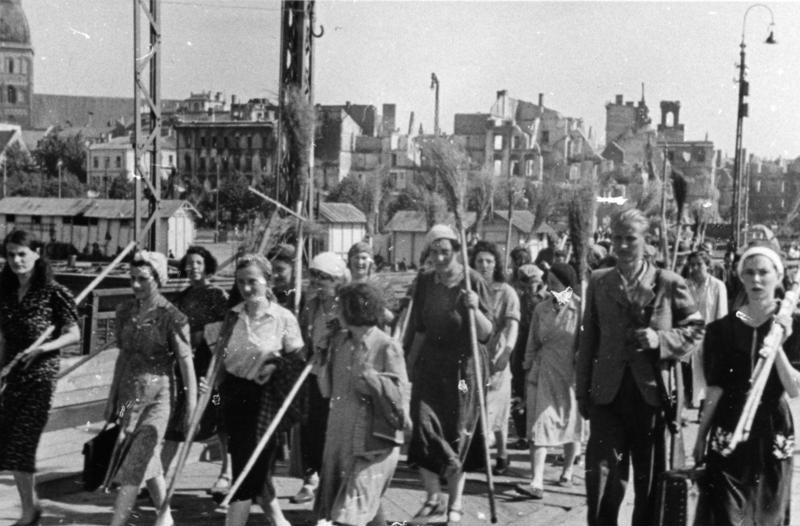
Women cleaning team in Riga, July 11, 1941

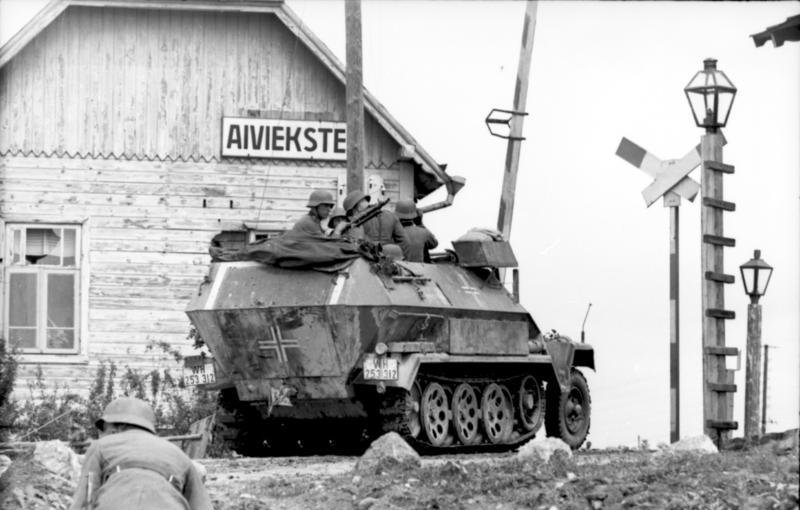
Germans at Aiviekste railroad station

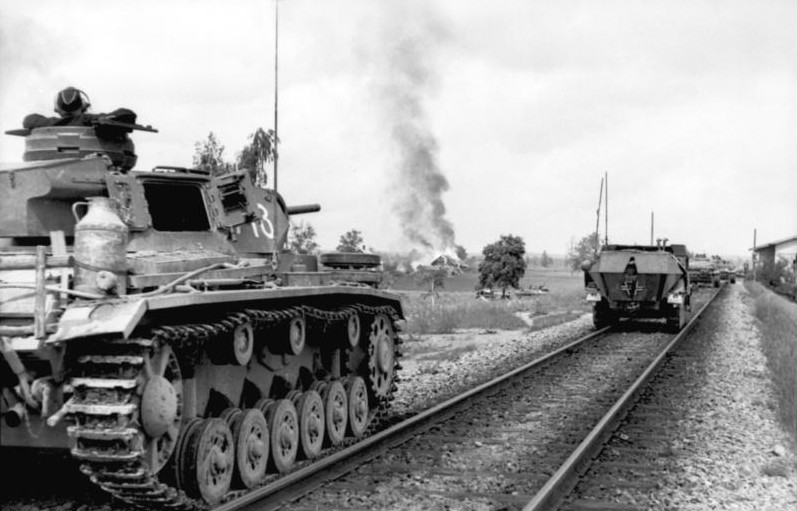
German tanks in action near Aiviekste railroad station

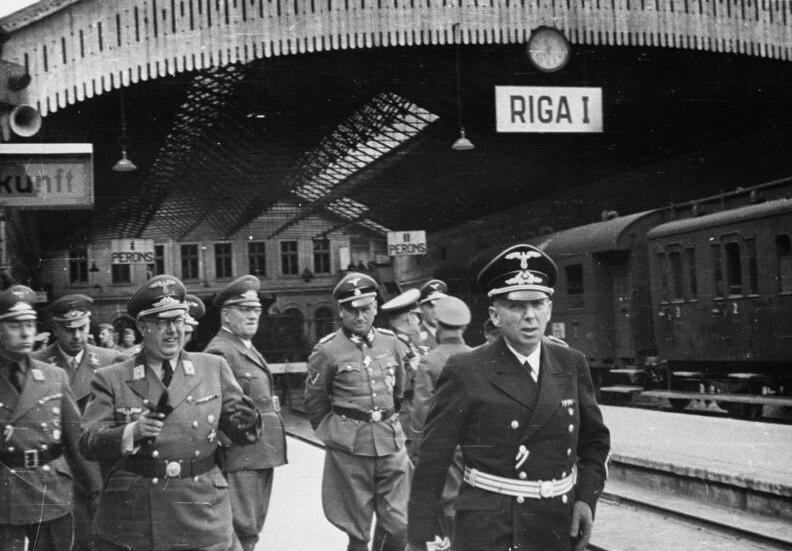
Hinrich Lohse in Riga

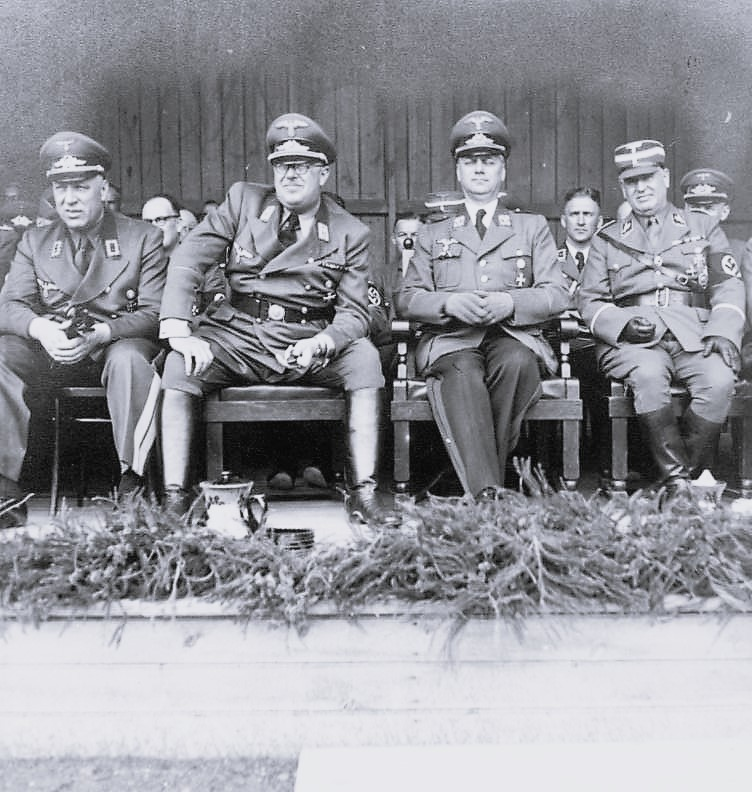
Reichsminister Alfred Rosenberg during visit to occupied Latvia, 1942

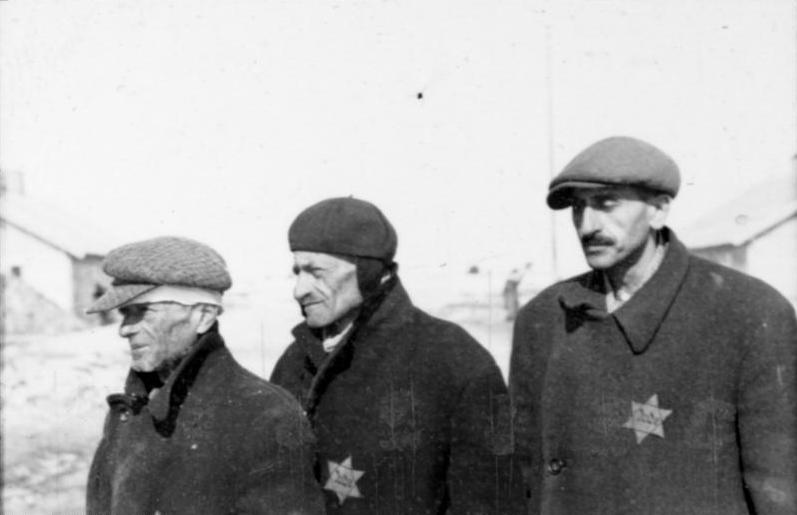
Jewish prisoners in Salaspils concentration camp

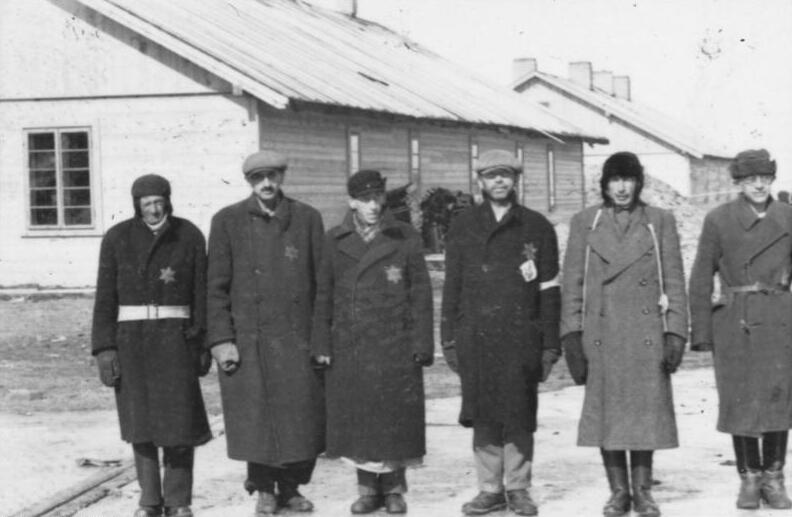
Jewish prisoners in Salaspils concentration camp

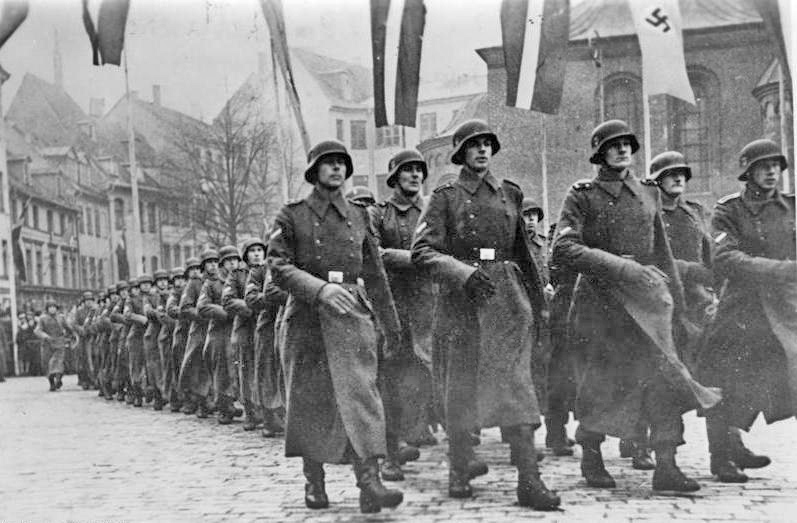
Latvian Legion soldiers in Riga, 1943

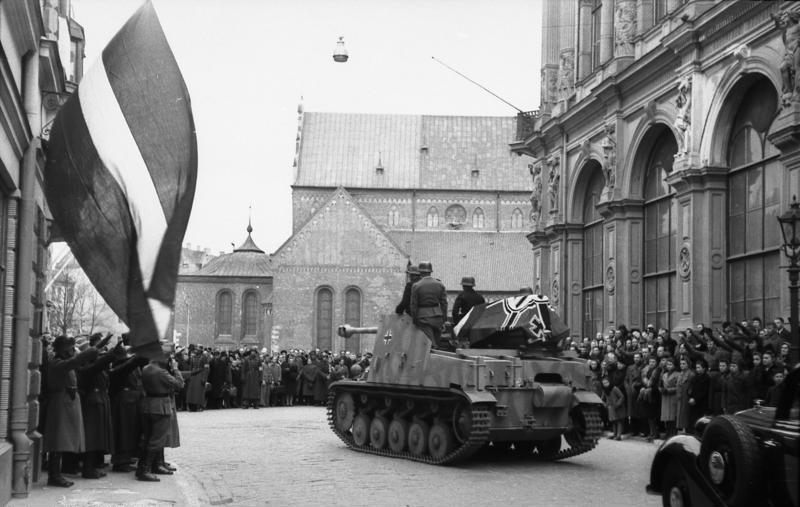
Funeral of Voldemars Veiss in Riga, 1944

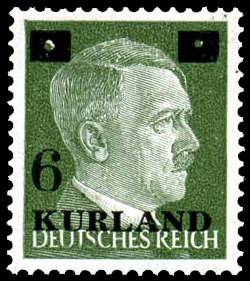
German postal stamp from the Courland Pocket, 1945

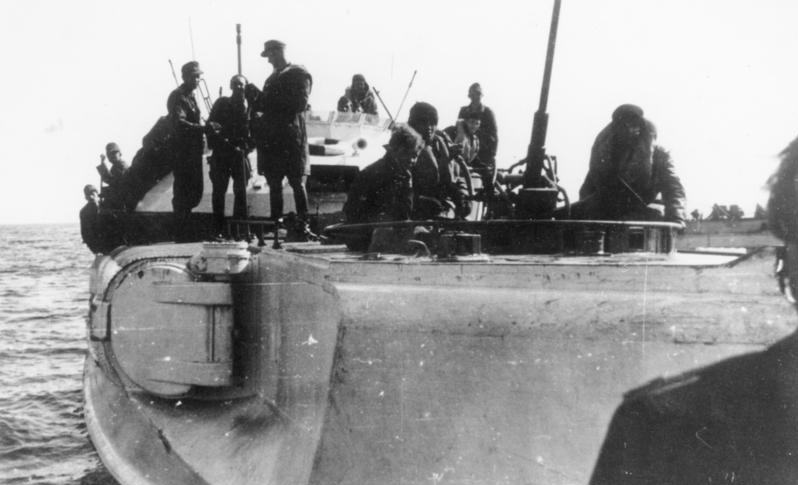
Last troops leaving Liepāja port, May 8, 1945

== Soviet occupation (1944–1990) ==
Flag of the Latvian SSR.

In 1944, when Soviet military advances reached the area, heavy fighting took place in Latvia between German and Soviet troops, which ended with another German defeat. Riga was re-captured by the Soviet Red Army on October 13, 1944, while the Courland Pocket held out until May 9, 1945. During the course of the war, both occupying forces conscripted Latvians into their armies, in this way increasing the loss of the nation's "live resources". In 1944, part of the Latvian territory once more came under Soviet control and Latvian national partisans began their fight against another occupier – the Soviet Union. 160,000 Latvian inhabitants took refuge from the Soviet army by fleeing to Germany and Sweden.On the other side, many Latvians who had previously supported Bolshevism had chosen to remain in Soviet Russia, where they wielded disproportionate influence in the party.

=== Purge of national communists ===
On March 5, 1953 Joseph Stalin died and was succeeded by Nikita Khrushchev. The period known as the Khrushchev Thaw began, but attempts by the national communists led by Eduards Berklavs to gain a degree of autonomy for the republic and protect the rapidly deteriorating position of the Latvian language were not successful. In 1959, after Khrushchev's visit to Latvia, national communists were stripped of their posts and Berklavs was deported to Russia.

=== Influx of Soviet immigrants ===
Because Latvia had still maintained a well-developed infrastructure and educated specialists it was decided in Moscow that some of the Soviet Union's most advanced manufacturing factories were to be based in Latvia. New industry was created in Latvia, including a major machinery factory RAF in Jelgava, electrotechnical factories in Riga, chemical factories in Daugavpils, Valmiera and Olaine, as well as food and oil processing plants. However, there were not enough people to operate the newly built factories. In order to expand industrial production, more immigrants from other Soviet republics were transferred into the country, noticeably decreasing the proportion of ethnic Latvians.

By 1989, the ethnic Latvians comprised about 52% of the population (1,387,757), compared to a pre-war proportion of 77% (1,467,035). In 2005 there were 1,357,099 ethnic Latvians, showing a real decrease in the titular population. Proportionately, however, the titular nation already comprises approximately 60% of the total population of Latvia (2,375,000).

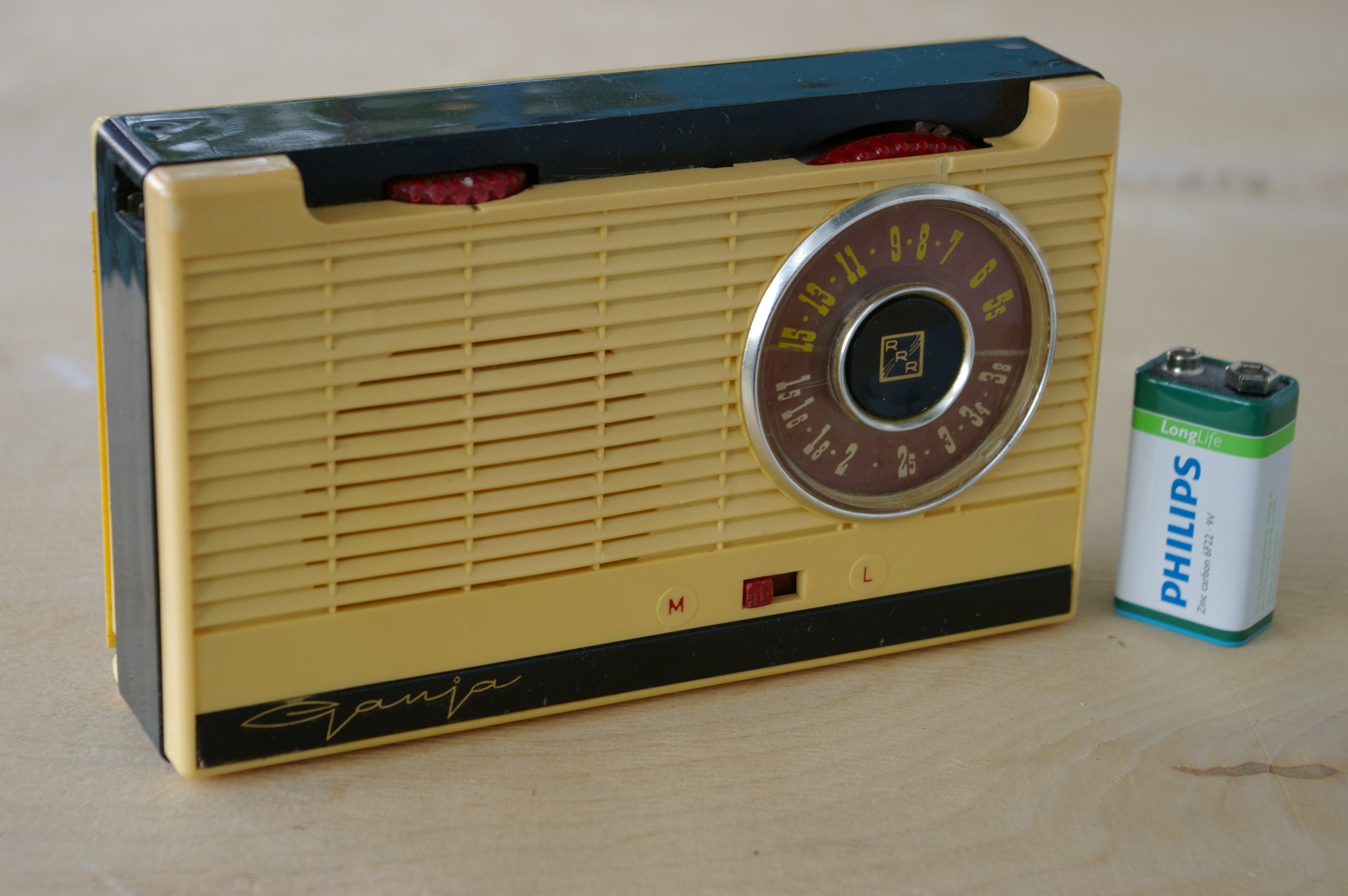
Portable radio built in RRR

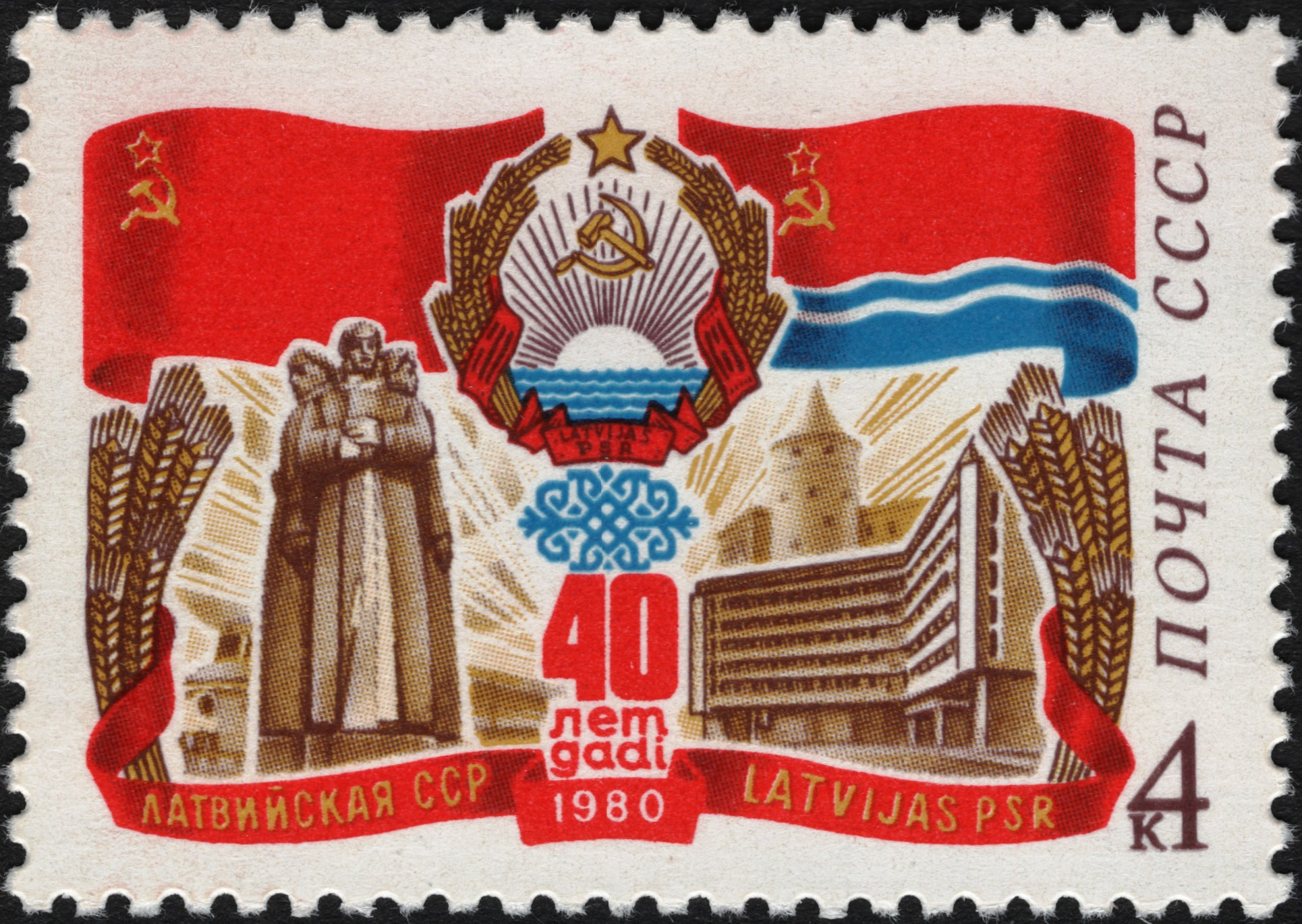
Soviet stamp celebrating 40 years of Latvian SSR

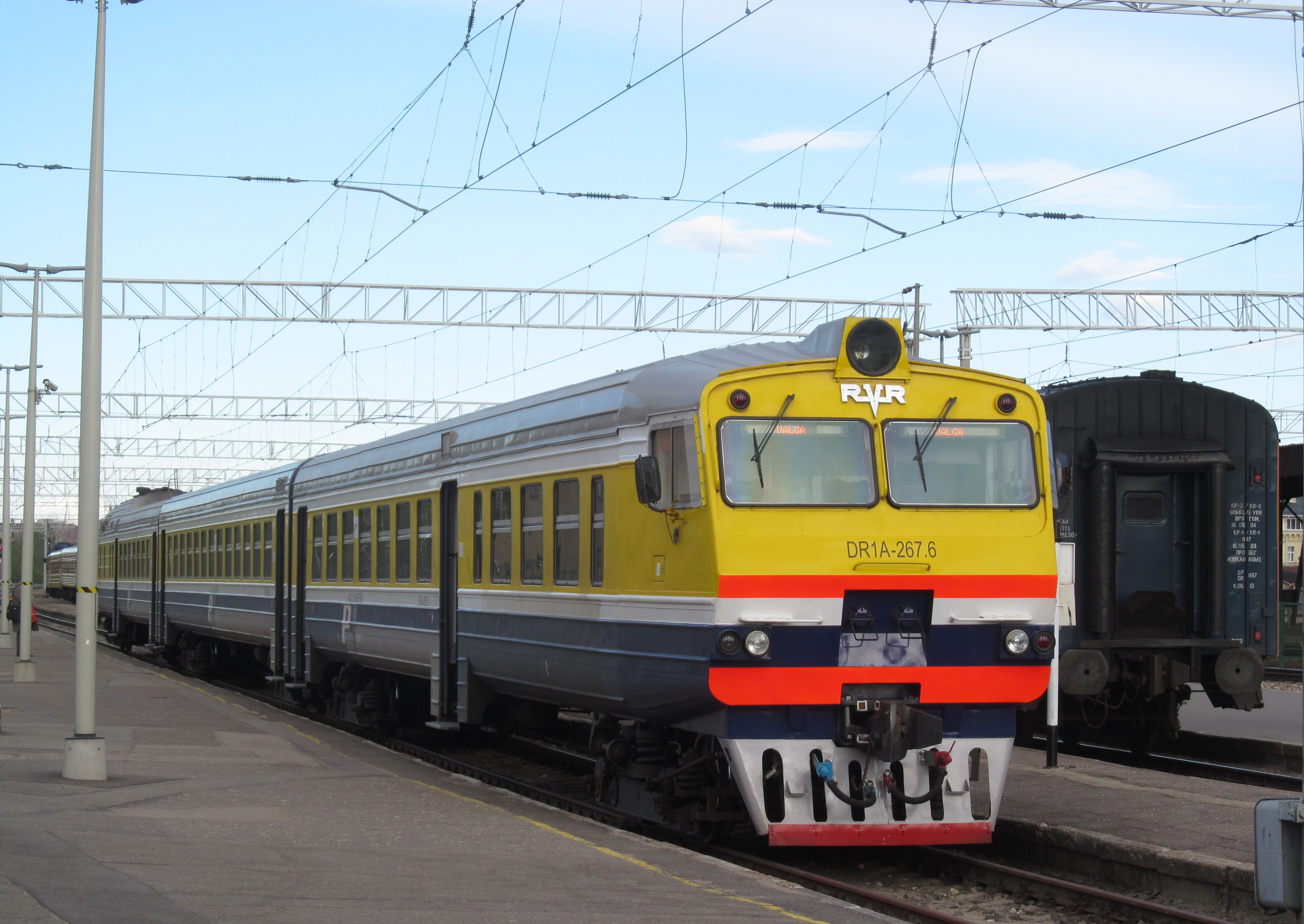
Train built in RVR

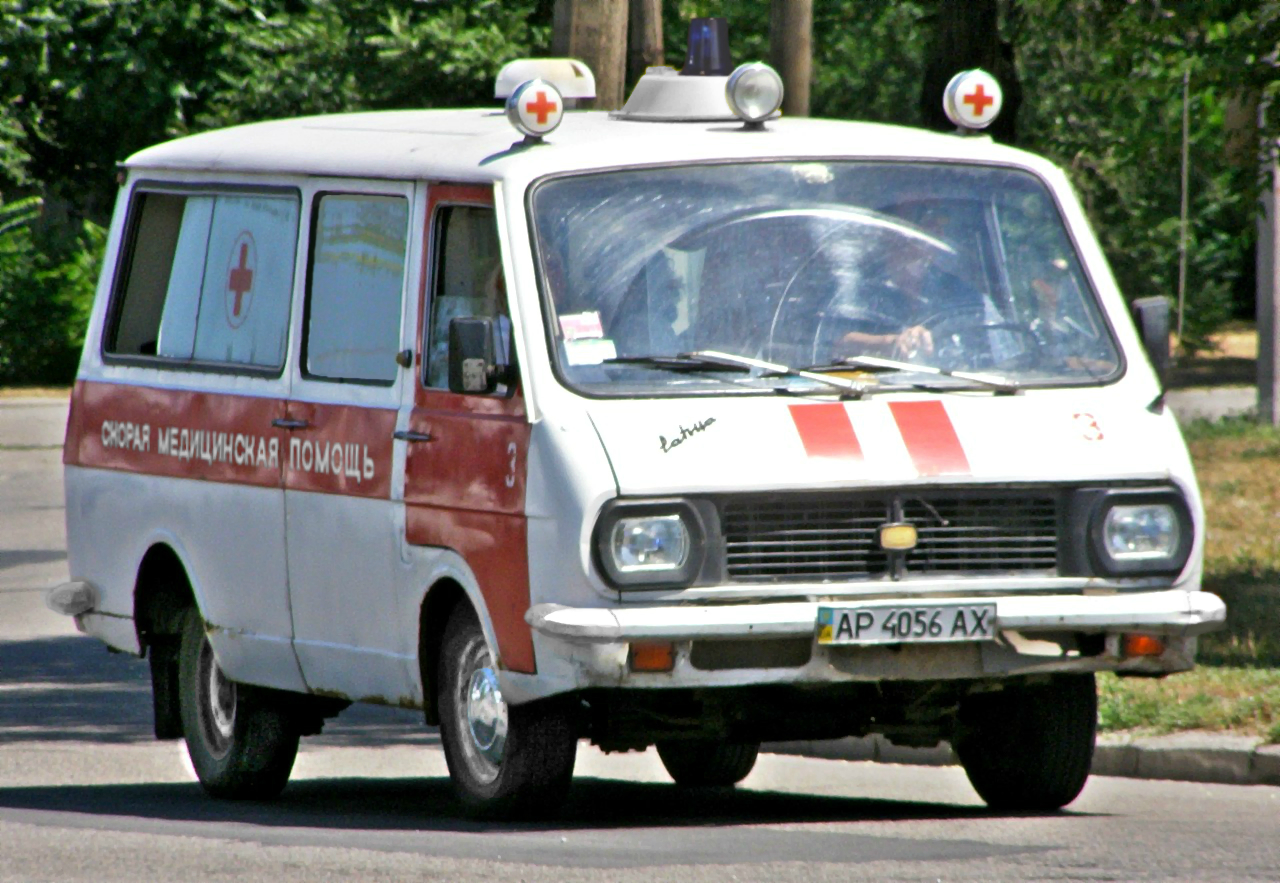
The iconic RAF minibus

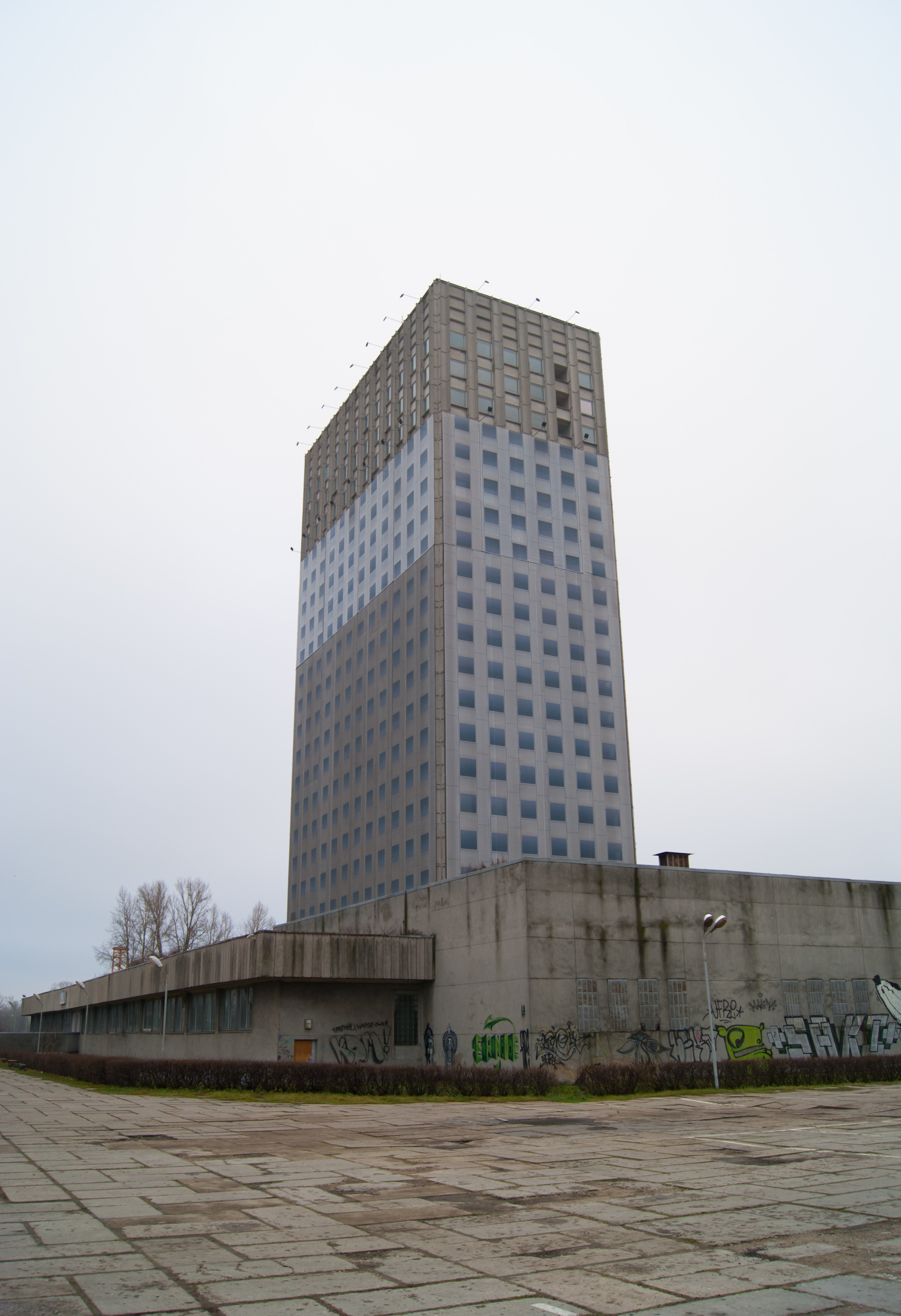
The abandoned House of Press

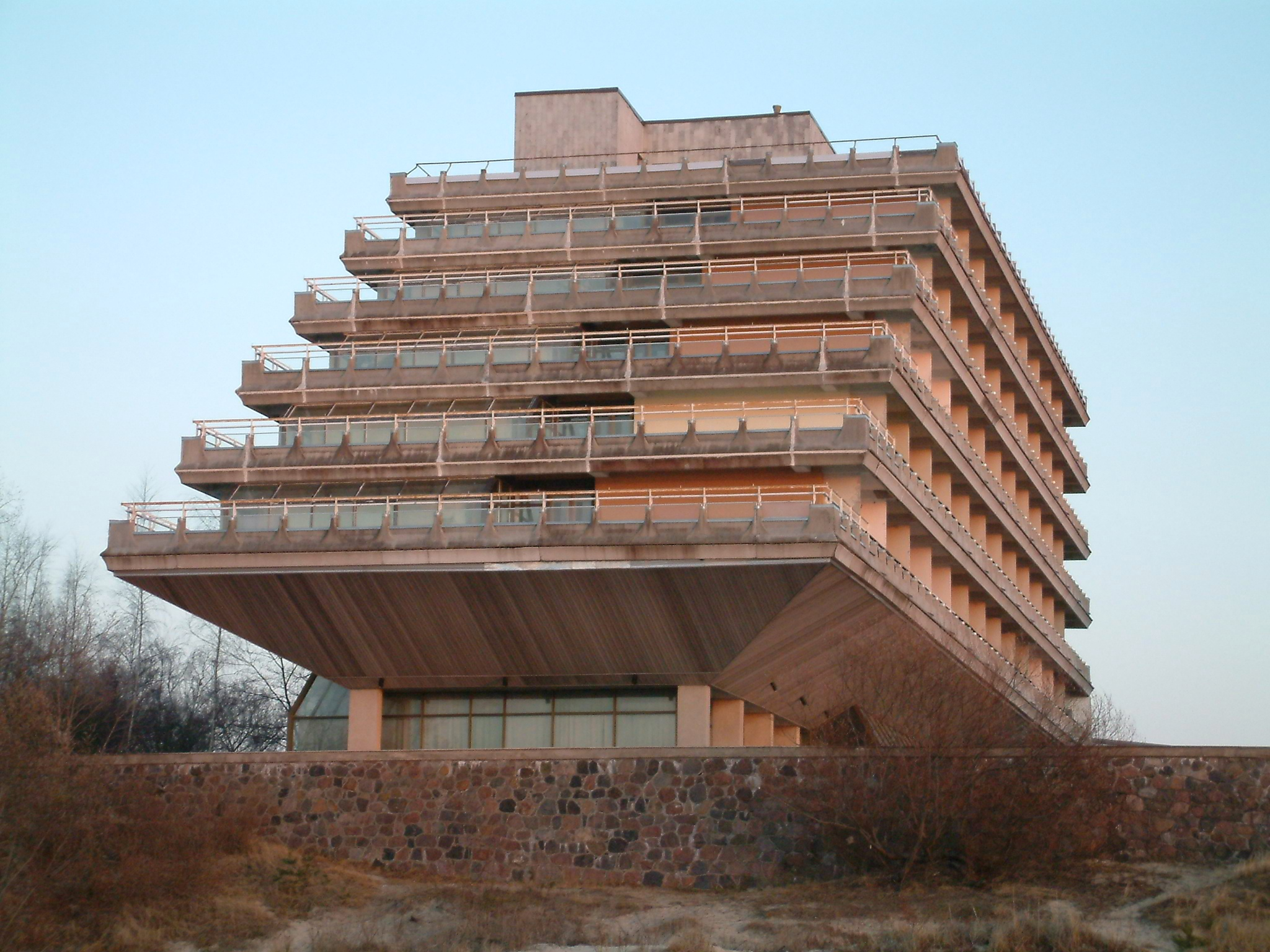
Soviet nomenklatura sanatorium in Jūrmala

== Restoration of independence ==
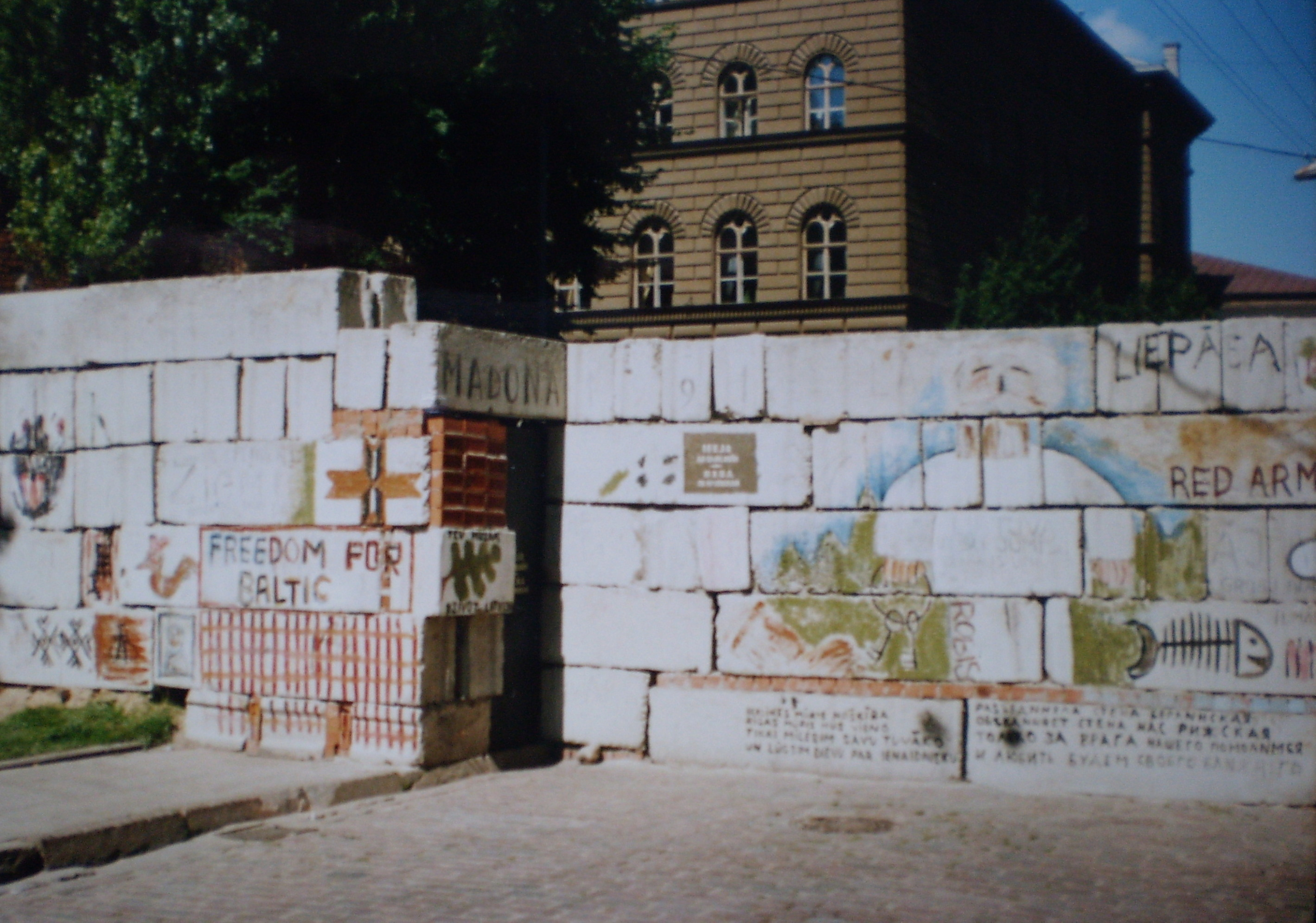
Barricade in Riga to prevent the Soviet Army from reaching the Latvian Parliament, July 1991.

Liberalization in the communist regime began in the mid-1980s in the USSR with the perestroika and glasnost instituted by Mikhail Gorbachev. In Latvia, several mass political organizations were constituted that made use of this opportunity – Popular Front of Latvia (Tautas Fronte), Latvian National Independence Movement (Latvijas Nacionālās Neatkarības Kustība) and Citizens' Congress (Pilsoņu kongress). These groups began to agitate for the restoration of national independence.

On the 50th anniversary of the Molotov-Ribbentrop pact (August 23, 1989) to the fate of the Baltic nations, Latvians, Lithuanians and Estonians joined hands in a human chain, the Baltic Way, that stretched 600 kilometers from Tallinn, to Riga, to Vilnius. It symbolically represented the united wish of the Baltic States for independence.

Subsequent steps toward full independence were taken on May 4, 1990. The Latvian SSR Supreme Council, elected in the first democratic elections since the 1930s, adopted a declaration restoring independence that included a transition period between autonomy within the Soviet Union and full independence. In January 1991, however, pro-communist political forces attempted to restore Soviet power with the use of force. Latvian demonstrators managed to stop the Soviet troops from re-occupying strategic positions (January 1991 events in Latvia). On August 21, after the unsuccessful attempt at a coup d'état in Moscow, parliament voted for an end to the transition period, thus restoring Latvia's pre-war independence. On September 6, 1991, Latvian independence was once again recognized by the Soviet Union.

== Modern history ==
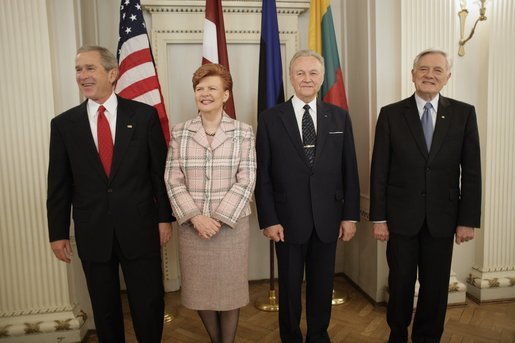
George W. Bush, Vaira Vīķe-Freiberga, Arnold Rüütel, and Valdas Adamkus in Riga, May 7, 2005.

Soon after reinstating independence, Latvia, which had been a member of the League of Nations prior to World War II, became a member of the United Nations. In 1992, Latvia became eligible for the International Monetary Fund and in 1994 took part in the NATO Partnership for Peace program in addition to signing the free trade agreement with the European Union. Latvia became a member of the European Council as well as a candidate for the membership in the European Union and NATO. Latvia was the first of the three Baltic nations to be accepted into the World Trade Organization.

At the end of 1999 in Helsinki, the heads of the European Union governments invited Latvia to begin negotiations regarding accession to the European Union. In 2004, Latvia's most important foreign policy goals, membership of the European Union and NATO, were fulfilled. On April 2, Latvia became a member of NATO and on May 1, Latvia, along with the other two Baltic States, became a member of the European Union. Around 67% had voted in favor of EU membership in a September 2003 referendum with turnout at 72.5%. Latvia signed the Schengen agreement on 16 April 2003 and started its implementation on 21 December 2007. In November 2013, roof collapsed at a shopping center in Riga, causing Latvia's worst post-independence disaster with the deaths of 54 rush hour shoppers and rescue personnel. On 1 January 2014, Latvia joined the eurozone, becoming a member of the group of EU states which uses the euro as its currency.

In May 2023, the parliament elected Edgars Rinkevics as new President of Latvia, making him the Baltic States’ first openly gay head of state.

=== Regional timeline ===
Affiliations of the areas that comprise modern Latvia in historical and regional context:

Century
Century	North Estonia	South Estonia	North Latvia	South Latvia	Lithuania	
10th	Finnic tribes		Baltic tribes		Baltic tribes	
11th 12th	Ancient Estonia		Ancient Latvia		Ancient Lithuania	
13th	Danish Estonia	Livonian Order			Grand Duchy of Lithuania	
14th	Danish Estonia	Livonian Order			Grand Duchy of Lithuania	
15th		Livonian Order			Grand Duchy of Lithuania	
16th	Swedish Estonia	Polish–Lithuanian Commonwealth (Duchy of Livonia)			Polish–Lithuanian Commonwealth (Grand Duchy of Lithuania)	
17th	Swedish Estonia	Swedish Livonia			Polish–Lithuanian Commonwealth (Grand Duchy of Lithuania)	
18th	Russian Empire (Governorate of Estonia)	Russian Empire (Governorate of Livonia)		Polish–Lithuanian Commonwealth (Duchy of Courland and Semigallia)	Polish–Lithuanian Commonwealth (Grand Duchy of Lithuania)	
19th	Russian Empire (Governorate of Estonia)	Russian Empire (Governorate of Livonia)		Russian Empire (Courland Governorate)	Russian Empire (Government of Kaunas)	Russian Empire (Vilna Governorate)
20th	Republic of Estonia		Republic of Latvia		Republic of Lithuania	
21st	Republic of Estonia (EU)		Republic of Latvia (EU)		Republic of Lithuania (EU)	

== See also ==
- Dissolution of the Soviet Union
- History of Riga
- Latvian independence movement (1940–1991)
- Latvian diplomatic service (1940–1991)
- List of presidents of Latvia
- Prime Minister of Latvia
- Livonia
- Politics of Latvia
