= List of Latvians =

This list of prominent Latvians includes:

- people who were born in the historical territory of what is now Latvia, regardless of ethnicity, citizenship, or time period; and
- people of Latvian descent regardless of their place of birth or citizenship.

== A ==
- Valerians Abakovskis (1895–1921) – inventor of a propeller-powered railcar, the aerowagon
- Rutanya Alda (Rutanya Alda Skrastiņa, born 1942) – actress (Mommie Dearest, The Deer Hunter)
- Lidiia Alekseeva (1909–1989), Latvian poet and writer of short stories
- Viktor Alksnis (born 1950) – Soviet military officer and Russian communist politician known as "the Black Colonel"
- Juris Alunāns (1832–1864) – writer and philologist
- Ingrīda Andriņa (1944–2015) – actress
- Iveta Apkalna (born 1976) – organist
- Fricis Apšenieks (1894–1941) – chess player
- Vija Artmane (1929–2008) – actress
- Aspazija, pen-name of Elza Pliekšāne (1865–1943) – poet and playwright
- Gunārs Astra (1931–1988) – dissident, fighter for human rights
- Auseklis, pseudonym of Miķelis Krogzemis (1850–1879) – poet, author and translator of German poets

== B ==
- Ainars Bagatskis (born 1967) – basketball player
- Helmuts Balderis (born 1952) – ice hockey player, forward
- Jānis Balodis (1881–1965) – army officer and politician
- Kārlis Balodis (1864–1931) – economist, financist, statistician and demographist
- Krišjānis Barons (1835–1923) – "the father of Latvian folk songs"; compiled and edited the first publication of Latvian folk-song texts, Latvju Dainas (1894–1915)
- Mikhail Baryshnikov (born 1948) – ballet dancer
- Kārlis Baumanis (1835–1905) – composer, author of the national anthem of the Republic of Latvia "Dievs, svētī Latviju!" ("God Bless Latvia!")
- Vizma Belševica (1931–2005) – author, candidate for the Nobel Prize in Literature
- Eduards Berklavs (1914–2004) – politician, leader of Latvian national-communists
- Krišjānis Berķis (1884–1942) – general
- Dairis Bertāns (born 1989) – basketball player
- Isaiah Berlin (Jesaja Berlins, 1909–1997) – philosopher
- Lilita Bērziņa (1903–1983) – actress
- Eduards Bērziņš (1894–1938) – soldier in the Red Army, later head of Dalstroy, the Kolyma forced-labour camps in North-Eastern Siberia
- Yan Karlovich Berzin (1889–1938) – Soviet military intelligence officer
- Kaspars Bērziņš (born 1985) – basketball player
- Kārlis Bētiņš (1867–1943) – chess player
- Andris Biedriņš (born 1986) – basketball player
- Gunārs Birkerts (1925–2017) – architect
- Miervaldis Birze (1921–2000) – writer
- Ernests Blanks (1894–1972) – publicist, writer, historian, the first to publicly advocate for Latvia's independence
- Rūdolfs Blaumanis (1863–1908) – writer and playwright
- Himans Blūms (1913–2009) – painter
- Jānis Blūms (born 1982) – basketball player
- Ārons Bogoļubovs (born 1938) – Olympic medalist in judoka
- Mairis Briedis (born 1985) – world boxing champion
- Baiba Broka (born 1973) – actress
- Baiba Broka (born 1975) – lawyer and politician
- Ingūna Butāne (born 1986) – fashion model

== C ==
- Frīdrihs Canders (1887–1933) – pioneer of rocketry and spaceflight
- Valters Caps (1905–2003) – designed first Minox 8 x 11 photo cameras
- Aleksandrs Cauņa (born 1988) – footballer
- Gustavs Celmiņš (1899–1968) – fascist politician, leader of Pērkonkrusts movement
- Vija Celmins (born 1938) – American painter born in Latvia
- Tanhum Cohen-Mintz (1939–2014) – Latvian-born Israeli basketball player

== Č ==
- Māris Čaklais (1940–2003) – poet
- Aleksandrs Čaks (1901–1950) – poet
- Jānis Čakste (1859–1927) – first President of Latvia

== D ==
- Roberts Dambītis (1881–1957) – general and politician
- Jānis Dāliņš (1904–1978) – athlete, race walker
- Emīls Dārziņš (1875–1910) – composer
- Volfgangs Dārziņš (1906–1962) – composer, pianist, and music critic
- Kaspars Daugaviņš (born 1988) – ice hockey player
- Jacob Davis (1834–1908) – inventor of denim
- Johans Aleksandrs Heinrihs Klapje de Kolongs (1839–1901) – naval engineer
- Eliass Eliezers Desslers (1892–1953) – Orthodox rabbi, Talmudic scholar, and Jewish philosopher
- Elīna Dikaioulaku (born 1989) – basketball player for Israeli team Elitzur Ramla
- Leor Dimant (born 1972) – DJ for the rap metal group Limp Bizkit
- Anatols Dinbergs (1911–1993) – diplomat
- Aleksis Dreimanis (1914–2011) – geologist
- Inga Drozdova (born 1975) – model and actress
- Domenique Dumont – music producer
- Oļģerts Dunkers (1932–1997) – actor and film director
- Christine Dzidrums (born 1971) – author

== E ==
- Mihails Eizenšteins (1867–1921) – architect
- Sergejs Eizenšteins (1898–1948) – film director
- Modris Eksteins (born 1943) – Canadian historian and writer
- Ēriks Ešenvalds (born 1977) – composer
- Andrievs Ezergailis (1930–2022) – historian of the Holocaust

== F ==
- Movša Feigins (1908–1950) – chess player
- Gregors Fitelbergs (1879–1953) – conductor, composer and violinist
- Vesels fon Freitāgs-Loringhofens (1899–1944) – colonel and member of the German resistance against German dictator Adolf Hitler
- Laila Freivalds (born 1942) – former Swedish Minister for Foreign Affairs

== G ==
- Inese Galante (born 1954) – opera singer; soprano
- Gints Gabrāns (born 1970) – artist
- Elīna Garanča (born 1976) – opera singer; mezzo-soprano
- Zemgus Girgensons (born 1994) – ice hockey centre
- Kārlis Goppers (1876–1941) – general; founder of Latvian Boy Scouts
- Andrejs Grants (born 1955) – photographer
- Kristers Gudļevskis (born 1992) – ice hockey goaltender
- Ernests Gulbis (born 1988) – tennis player
- Natālija Gulbis (born 1983) – Latvian-descent LPGA golfer
- Pāvels Gumennikovs (born 1986) – Latvian film director, actor, writer, and producer

== Ģ ==
- Uldis Ģērmanis (1915–1997) – historian; under the alias of Ulafs Jāņsons, a social commentator
- Aivars Ģipslis (1937–2000) – chess player

== H ==
- Moriss Halle (1923–2018) – linguist
- Filips Halsmans (1906–1979) – Latvian-American photographer
- Juris Hartmanis (1928–2022) – computer scientist; Turing Award winner
- Uvis Helmanis (born 1972) – basketball player

== I ==
- Artūrs Irbe (born 1967) – ice hockey player, goalkeeper
- Kārlis Irbītis (1904–1997) – aviation inventor, engineer, designer

== J ==
- Gatis Jahovičs (born 1984) – basketball player
- Mariss Jansons (1943–2019) – conductor
- Inese Jaunzeme (1932–2011) – athlete

== K ==
- Aivars Kalējs (born 1951) – organist, composer
- Konrāds Kalējs (1913–2001) – alleged war criminal
- Sandra Kalniete (born 1952) – politician, diplomat, former Latvia's EU commissioner
- Bruno Kalniņš (1899–1990) – Saeima member, Red Army General
- Imants Kalniņš (born 1941) – composer, politician
- Oskars Kalpaks (1882–1919) – colonel, first Commander of Latvian National Armed Forces
- Kaspars Kambala (born 1978) – basketball player
- Arturs Krišjānis Kariņš (born 1964) – politician; Prime Minister of Latvia
- Mārtiņš Karsums (born 1986) – ice hockey player
- Reinis Kaudzīte (1839–1920) – writer and journalist
- Renārs Kaupers (born 1974) – musician
- Jēkabs Ketlers (1610–1682) – Duke of the Duchy of Courland and Semigallia
- Gustavs Klucis (1895–1938) – painter and graphic designer
- Aleksandrs Koblencs (1916–1993) – chess player
- Ābrams Izāks Kūks (1864–1935) – chief rabbi, Jewish thinker, statesman, diplomat, mediator and scholar
- Aleksandrs Kovaļevskis (1840–1901) – zoologist
- Ilsa Konrads (born 1944) – Olympic swimmer
- John Konrads (1942–2021) – Olympic swimmer
- Gidons Krēmers (born 1947) – violinist and conductor
- Miķelis Krogzemis (1850–1879) – poet, author and translator of German poets
- Juris Kronbergs (born 1946) – poet, writer, free-lance journalist, translator
- Atis Kronvalds (1837–1875) – teacher and journalist; reformed the Latvian language; organized the first Latvian Song and Dance Festival
- Dainis Kūla (born 1959) – athlete (Olympic gold medal in javelin)
- Alberts Kviesis (1881–1944) – President of Latvia

== L ==
- Vilis Lācis (1904–1966) – author and politician
- Aleksandrs Laime (1911–1994) – explorer
- Ginta Lapiņa (born 1989) – fashion model
- Yan Larri (1900–1977) Soviet children's and utopian fiction writer
- Natālija Lašenova (born 1973) – gymnastics Olympic champion (team)
- Edvards Liedskalniņš (1887–1951) – builder of Coral Castle in Florida; claimed to have discovered the ancient magnetic levitation secrets used to construct the Egyptian pyramids
- Jēkabs Mihaels Reinholds Lencs (1751–1792) – author
- Marija Leiko (1887–1937) – actress
- Vita Liberte (living) – lawyer, art collector, patron and entrepreneur
- Māris Liepa (1936–1989) – ballet dancer
- Peggy Lipton (1946–2019) – Latvian-American actress
- Nikolajs Loskis (1870–1965) – philosopher
- Jānis Lūsis (1939–2020) – athlete; Olympic champion

== Ļ ==
- Jevgēnija Ļisicina (born 1942) – organist

== M ==
- Māris Martinsons (born 1960) – film director, producer, screenwriter and film editor
- Hermanis Matisons (1894–1932) – chess player
- Zenta Mauriņa (1897–1978) – writer, literary scholar, culture philosopher
- Juris Māters (1845–1884) – author, lawyer and journalist; translated laws to Latvian and created the foundation for Latvian law
- Jānis Medenis (1903–1961) – poet
- Arnis Mednis (born 1961) – singer
- Zigfrīds Anna Meierovics (1887–1925) – first Latvian Minister of Foreign Affairs
- Mareks Mejeris (born 1991) – basketball player for Hapoel Jerusalem of the Israeli Basketball Premier League
- Alan Melikdjanian (born 1980) – independent filmmaker, YouTuber
- Leo Mihelsons (1887–1978) – artist
- Arnolds Mikelsons (1922–1984) – artist
- Mikhail Tal (1936–1992) – chess player Grandmaster (GM)
- Jevgēņijs Millers (1867–1938) – tsarist Russian general
- Kārlis Mīlenbahs (1853–1916) – linguist

== N ==
- Arkādijs Naidičs (born 1985) – chess player; now resident in Germany
- Andris Nelsons (born 1978) – conductor, Boston Symphony Orchestra
- Andrievs Niedra (1871–1941) – pastor, writer, prime minister of German puppet government (1919)
- Arons Nimcovičs (1886–1935) – chess player
- Reinis Nitišs (born 1995) – World Rallycross driver
- Fred Norris (born 1955) – radio personality, The Howard Stern Show

== O ==
- Staņislavs Olijars (born 1979) – athlete (European champion in 110m hurdles)
- Jeļena Ostapenko (born 1997) – tennis player (Grand Slam champion) (no Latvian ethnicity)
- Vilhelms Ostvalds (1853–1932) – received the Nobel Prize in Chemistry in 1909 for his work on catalysis, chemical equilibria and reaction velocities
- Elvīra Ozoliņa (born 1939) – athlete (Olympic gold medal in javelin)
- Sandis Ozoliņš (born 1972) – ice hockey player, defense
- Valdemārs Ozoliņš (1896–1973) – composer, conductor
- Auseklis Ozols (1941–2025) – artist

== P ==
- Artis Pabriks (born 1966) – Latvian Minister of Foreign Affairs (2007–2007)
- Ināra Petrusēviča (born 1969) – artist
- Kārlis Padegs (1911–1940) – graphic artist, painter
- Marians Pahars (born 1976) – soccer player
- Raimonds Pauls (born 1936) – composer; widely known in Russia
- Lūcija Peka (1912–1991) – artist of the Latvian diaspora
- Konstantīns Pēkšēns (1859–1928) – Art nouveau architect
- Jēkabs Peterss (1886–1938) – revolutionary and Soviet Cheka leader
- Kaspars Petrovs (born 1978) – serial killer
- Vladimirs Petrovs (1907–1943) – chess player
- Oskars Perro (1918–2003) – soldier and writer
- Andris Piebalgs (born 1957) – politician and diplomat; European Commissioner for Energy
- Jānis Pliekšāns (1865–1929) – writer; author of a number of poetry collections
- Juris Podnieks (1950–1992) – film director, producer
- Nikolajs Poļakovs (1900–1974) – circus performer; creator of Coco the Clown
- Jānis Poruks (1871–1911) – writer
- Kristaps Porziņģis (born 1995) – basketball player, Boston Celtics
- Rosa von Praunheim (1942–2025) – German film director, author, painter and gay rights activist
- Sandis Prūsis (born 1965) – athlete, bobsleigh
- Uldis Pūcītis (1937–2000) – actor, director
- Boris Pugo (1937–1991) – Soviet communist politician
- Jānis Pujats (born 1930) – Roman Catholic cardinal
- Andrejs Pumpurs (1841–1901) – poet; author of Latvian national epic Lāčplēsis

== R ==
- Rainis, pseudonym of Jānis Pliekšāns (1865–1929) – poet and playwright
- Dan Rapoport (born 1970) – American financier and philanthropist
- Laura Rizzotto (born 1994) – Latvian-Brazilian singer
- Lauris Reiniks (born 1979) – singer-songwriter, actor and television personality
- Einars Repše (born 1961) – politician
- Jānis Rieksts (1881–1970) – photographer
- Lolita Ritmanis (born 1962) – orchestrator, composer
- Iļja Ripss (born 1948) – inventor of the Bible code
- Fricis Rokpelnis (1909–1969) – author
- Markuss Rotkovičs (1903–1970) – abstract expressionist painter
- Elza Rozenberga (1865–1943) – poet, playwright; married to Jānis Pliekšāns
- Margaret Romans (1912–2025), supercentenarian and oldest Latvian-born person in history
- Juris Rubenis (born 1961) – Lutheran pastor
- Mārtiņš Rubenis (born 1978) – athlete; bronze medalist at the 2006 Winter Olympics in Turin
- Brunis Rubess (1926–2009) – businessman
- Inta Ruka (born 1958) – photographer
- Wolf Ruvinskis (1921–1999) – versatile actor, a memorable face of the Cinema of Mexico

== S ==
- Rudolfs Saule (1903–1975) – ballet master; performer with the Latvian National Ballet
- Uļjana Semjonova (born 1952) – basketball player
- Haralds Silovs (born 1986) – short track and long track speed skater
- Kārlis Skalbe (1879–1945) – poet
- Kārlis Skrastiņš (1974–2011) – ice hockey player
- Baiba Skride (born 1981) – violinist
- Andrew Smith (born 1992) – American-Latvian basketball player in the Israeli Basketball Premier League
- Konstantīns Sokoļskis (1904–1991) – romance and tango singer
- Ksenia Solo (born 1987) – Latvian-Canadian actress
- Serge Sorokko (born 1954) – art dealer and publisher
- Raimonds Staprans (1926–2026) – Latvian-American painter
- Jānis Šteinhauers (1705–1779) – industrialist, entrepreneur, and civil rights activist
- Gotthard Friedrich Stender (1714–1796) – first Latvian grammarian
- Līna Šterna (1878–1968) – biologist and social activist
- Roze Stiebra (1942–2024) – animator
- Henrijs Stolovs (1901–1971) – stamp dealer
- Jānis Streičs (born 1936) – film director, screenwriter, actor
- Jānis Strēlnieks (born 1989) – basketball player
- Pēteris Stučka (1865–1932) – author, translator, editor, jurist and educator
- Jānis Sudrabkalns (1894–1975) – poet and journalist
- Jevgēņijs Svešņikovs (1950–2021) – chess player
- Staņislavs Svjanevičs (1899–1997) – economist and historian

== Š ==
- Viktors Ščerbatihs (born 1974) – athlete, weightlifter
- Pauls Šīmanis (1876–1944) – Baltic German journalist, politician, activist defending and preserving European minority cultures
- Vestards Šimkus (born 1984) – pianist
- Aleksejs Širovs (born 1972) – chess player
- Andris Šķēle (born 1958) – politician; Prime Minister of Latvia
- Armands Šķēle (born 1983) – basketball player
- Ainārs Šlesers (born 1970) – politician, chairman of Latvia First
- Ernests Štālbergs (1883–1958) – architect, ensemble of the Freedom Monument
- Īzaks Nahmans Šteinbergs (1888–1957) – politician, lawyer and author
- Māris Štrombergs (born 1987) – BMX cyclist; gold medal winner at 2008 and 2012 Olympics

== T ==
- Esther Takeuchi (born 1953) – materials scientist and chemical engineer
- Mihails Tāls (1936–1992) – the 8th World Chess Champion
- Jānis Roberts Tilbergs (1880–1972) – painter, sculptor

== U ==
- Guntis Ulmanis (born 1939) – President of Latvia
- Kārlis Ulmanis (1877–1942) – Prime Minister of Latvia; President of Latvia
- Juris Upatnieks (1936–2026) – physicist and inventor; pioneer in the field of holography
- Andrejs Upīts (1877–1970) – poet and writer

== V ==
- Ojārs Vācietis (1933–1983) – writer
- Romāns Vainšteins (born 1973) – cyclist, World Road Champion in 2000
- Krišjānis Valdemārs (1825–1891) – public figure, writer, publicist and economist
- Pauls Valdens (1863–1957) – chemist
- Miķelis Valters (1874–1968) – state official, journalist, diplomat
- Valdis Valters (born 1957) – basketball player
- Aleksandrs Vanags (1918–1986) – footballer
- Jānis Vanags (born 1958) – Lutheran archbishop
- Jūlijs Vanags (1903–1984) – author and translator
- Deniss Vasiļjevs (born 1999) – figure skater
- Pēteris Vasks (born 1946) – contemporary composer
- Jukums Vācietis (1873–1938) – first commander of the Soviet Army
- Ojārs Vācietis (1933–1983) – poet
- Kaspars Vecvagars (born 1993) – basketball club BC Žalgiris player
- Eduards Veidenbaums (1867–1892) – poet and translator
- Makss Veinreihs (1893–1969) – linguist
- Ed Viesturs (Edmunds Viesturs, born 1959) – mountaineer
- Igors Vihrovs (born 1978) – gymnast, gold medalist at Sydney Olympics in 2000
- Edvarts Virza (1883–1940) – writer
- Alvis Vītoliņš (1946–1997) – chess master
- Vaira Vīķe-Freiberga (born 1937) – former President of Latvia
- Jāzeps Vītols (1863–1948) – composer
- Māris Verpakovskis (born 1979) – footballer
- Aleksandrs Voitkevičs (1963–2006) – chess player

== Z ==
- Kārlis Zāle (1888–1942) – sculptor; author of the Freedom Monument in Riga
- Juris Zariņš (born 1945) – archaeologist and professor at Missouri State University
- Kārlis Zariņš (Charles Zarine) (1879–1963) – diplomat
- Rihards Zariņš (1869–1939) – graphic artist
- Valdis Zatlers (born 1955) – former President of Latvia
- Elmārs Zemgalis (1923–2014) – chess player
- Gustavs Zemgals (1871–1939) – former President of Latvia
- Imants Zemzaris (born 1951) – contemporary composer
- Valdis Zeps (1932–1996) – author and linguist; pseudonym Jānis Turbads
- Imants Ziedonis (1933–2013) – poet and folklorist
- Mārtiņš Zīverts (1903–1990) – playwright
- Kaspars Znotiņš (born 1975) – stage and film actor

== Ž ==
- Sergejs Žoltoks (1972–2004) – ice hockey player, forward

== See also ==
- Latvian Americans
- Latvian Canadians
