= Juris (name) =

Male given name

Juris is mostly a Latvian masculine given name derived from the Greek Γεώργιος (Georgios), meaning "farmer", and may refer to:

- Juris Alunāns (1832–1864), Latvian writer and philologist
- Juris Bārzdiņš (born 1966), Latvian politician
- Juris Bērziņš (born 1954), Latvian rower and Olympic competitor
- Juris Binde (born 1955), Latvian businessman
- Juris Cibuļs (born 1951), Latvian publicist, humanist, linguist and translator
- Juris Dalbiņš (born 1954), Latvian politician
- Juris Ekmanis (1941–2016), Latvian scientist and academic
- Juris Fernandez (born 1978), Filipino singer
- Juris Hartmanis (1928–2022), Latvian scientist
- Juris Kalniņš (1938–2010), Latvian basketball player and Olympic medalist
- Juris Kronbergs (1946–2020), Latvian-Swedish poet
- Juris Laizāns (born 1979), Latvian footballer
- Juris Lauciņš (1957–2013), Latvian actor
- Juris Markauss (born 1943), Latvian chess player
- Juris Māters (1845–1885), Latvian writer
- Juris Podnieks (1950–1992), Latvian film director
- Juris Rubenis (born 1961), Latvian Lutheran pastor
- Juris Šics (born 1983), Latvian luger and Olympic medalist
- Juris Silovs (born 1973), Latvian racing cyclist
- Juris Silovs (1950–2018), Latvian sprinter and Olympic medalist
- Juris Sokolovskis (born 1976), Latvian lawyer
- Juris Štāls (born 1982), Latvian ice-hockey player
- Juris Strenga (born 1937), Latvian actor
- Juris Tone (born 1961), Latvian bobsledder and Olympic medalist
- Juris Umbraško (born 1978), Latvian basketball player
- Juris Upatnieks (1936–2026), Latvian-born American physicist, inventor and pioneer in the field of holography
- Juris Upītis (born 1991), Latvian ice hockey player
- Juris Zariņš (born 1945), American archaeologist

== Stage name ==
- Vic Juris (born Victor Edward Jurusz Jr.; 1953–2019), American guitarist
