= Inara =

Inara or INARA may refer to:

== People, figures, characters ==
- Inara (goddess), Hittite-Hurrian deity
- Inara George (born 1974), American singer-songwriter
- Inara Luigas (born 1959), Estonian politician
- Ināra Mūrniece (born 1970), speaker of the twelfth Latvian Saeima
- Ināra Petrusēviča (born 1969), Latvian artist
- Ināra Rudko (born 1975), Latvian cross country skier
- Ināra Tetereva (born 1953), Latvian philanthropist
- Inara Serra, Firefly television series character

== Other uses ==
- Inara (Casablanca), neighbourhood in Casablanca, Morocco
- Inara Melon (Acanthosicyos horridus)
- Iran Nuclear Agreement Review Act of 2015
- International Network for Aid, Relief and Assistance, an American humanitarian organisation
- Inara II, a fictional space mission covering the first half of the TV show 9-1-1 2025 season 9

== See also ==
- The dictionary definition of inaras at Wiktionary
- Athyma inara (A. inara), a butterfly
- Serrodes inara (S. inara), a moth
