= Gints =

Gints is a given name. Notable people with the given name include:

- Gints Bude (born 1971), Latvian fashion designer
- Gints Freimanis (born 1985), Latvian footballer
- Gints Gabrāns (born 1970), Latvian artist
- Gints Gilis (born 1970), Latvian footballer
- Gints Meija (born 1987), Latvian ice hockey player
- Gints Zilbalodis (born 1994), Latvian filmmaker
