= Saule =

Saule ('sun' in Latvian/Lithuanian) (Note: as Saulė) may refer to:

== Places ==
- Saule, settlement in Skulte Parish, Limbaži Municipality, Latvia
- Saule, settlement in Jaunpils Parish, Tukums Municipality, Latvia
- Saule, settlement in Valka Parish, Valka Municipality, Latvia
  - Saule Station, train station on Riga – Lugaži Railway, Latvia
- Saule, settlement in Brenguļi Parish, Valmiera Municipality, Latvia

== Persons ==
- Saule/Saulė, solar goddess in Baltic mythology
- Rudolfs Saule, Latvian-American actor, ballerina and performer of the 20th century
- Saule (given name), a Kazakh, Afghan, Kyrgyz female given name
- Saule (singer), Belgian singer-songwriter

== Other ==
- Battle of Saule, between the Livonian Brothers of the Sword and Samogitians in 1236, according to the official Lithuanian view, near modern Šiauliai, the city nicknamed Saulės miestas (Sun City)

== See also ==
- Saules (disambiguation)
