= List of casinos in Wisconsin =

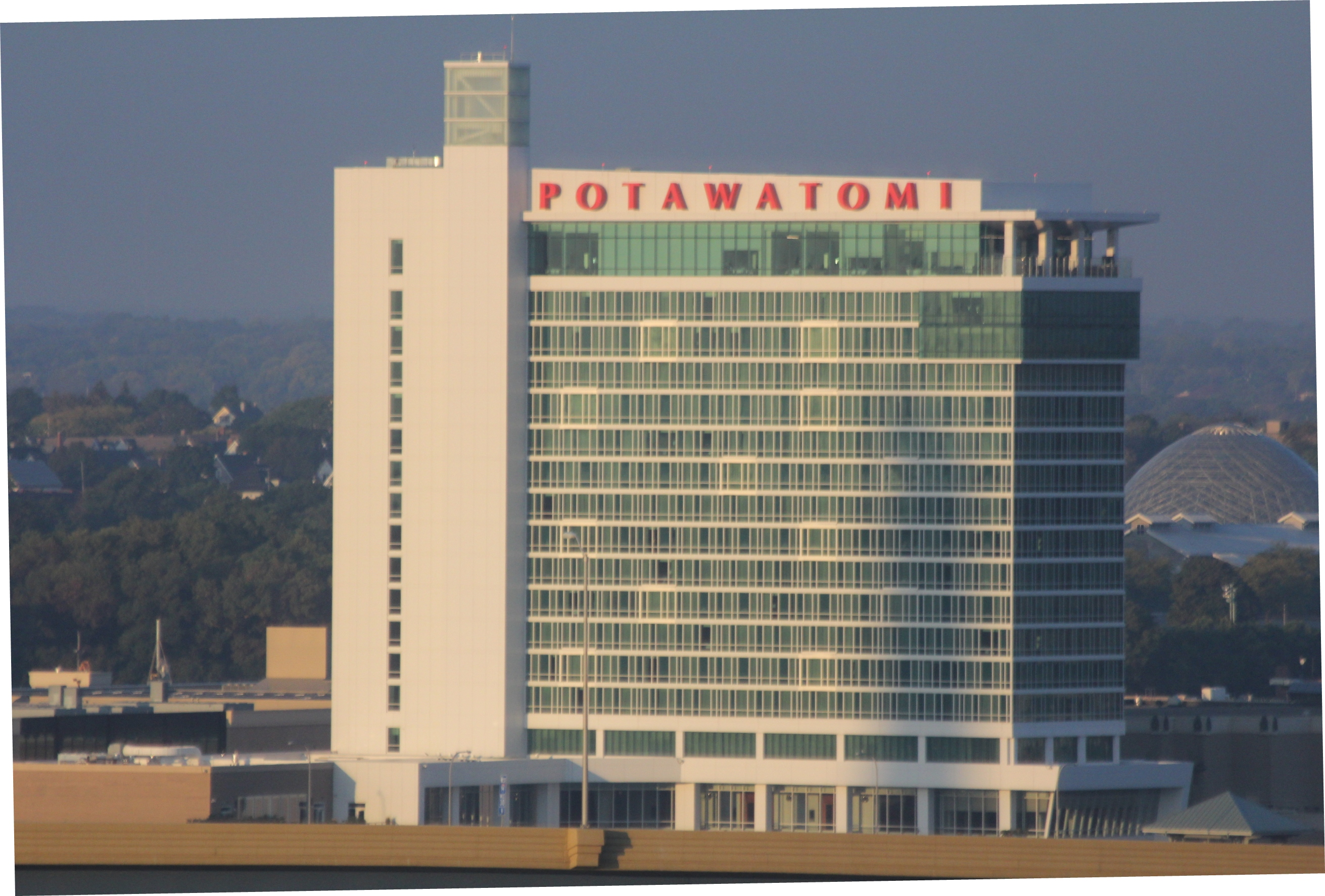
Potawatomi

This is a list of casinos in Wisconsin.

== List of casinos ==
List of casinos in the U.S. state of Wisconsin
Casino	City	County	State	District	Type	Comments
Bad River Lodge & Casino	Odanah	Ashland	Wisconsin		Land-based	Owned by the Bad River Band of Chippewa Indians
Grindstone Creek Casino	Hayward	Sawyer	Wisconsin		Land-based	Owned by the Lac Courte Oreilles Tribe; separate part of Sevenwinds Casino
Ho-Chunk Gaming Beloit	Beloit	Rock	Wisconsin		Land-based	Owned by the Ho-Chunk Nation; opening in 2026
Ho-Chunk Gaming Black River Falls	Black River Falls	Jackson	Wisconsin		Land-based	Owned by the Ho-Chunk Nation
Ho-Chunk Gaming Madison	Madison	Dane	Wisconsin		Land-based	Owned by the Ho-Chunk Nation
Ho-Chunk Gaming Nekoosa	Nekoosa	Wood	Wisconsin		Land-based	Owned by the Ho-Chunk Nation
Ho-Chunk Gaming Tomah	Tomah	Monroe	Wisconsin		Land-based	Owned by the Ho-Chunk Nation
Ho-Chunk Gaming Wisconsin Dells	Baraboo	Sauk	Wisconsin		Land-based	Owned by the Ho-Chunk Nation
Ho-Chunk Gaming Wittenberg	Wittenberg	Shawano	Wisconsin		Land-based	Owned by the Ho-Chunk Nation
Lake of the Torches Resort Casino	Lac du Flambeau	Vilas	Wisconsin		Land-based	Owned by the Lac du Flambeau Band of Lake Superior Chippewa
Legendary Waters Resort & Casino	Bayfield	Bayfield	Wisconsin		Land-based	Owned by the Red Cliff Band of Lake Superior Chippewa
Menominee Casino Resort	Keshena	Menominee	Wisconsin		Land-based	Owned by the Menominee Indian Tribe of Wisconsin
Mole Lake Casino & Lodge	Mole Lake	Forest	Wisconsin		Land-based	Owned by the Sokaogon Chippewa Community
North Star Mohican Casino Resort	Bowler	Shawano	Wisconsin		Land-based	Owned by the Stockbridge–Munsee Community
Oneida Casino - Main Airport	Green Bay	Brown	Wisconsin		Land-based	Owned by the Oneida Nation
Oneida Casino - Irene Moore Activity Center	Green Bay	Brown	Wisconsin		Land-based	Owned by the Oneida Nation
Oneida Casino - Packerland	Green Bay	Brown	Wisconsin		Land-based	Owned by the Oneida Nation
Oneida Casino - Travel Center	Pulaski	Brown	Wisconsin		Land-based	Owned by the Oneida Nation
Oneida Casino - West Mason Street Casino	Green Bay	Brown	Wisconsin		Land-based	Owned by the Oneida Nation
Potawatomi Hotel & Casino	Milwaukee	Milwaukee	Wisconsin		Land-based	Owned by the Forest County Potawatomi Community
Potawatomi Carter Casino Hotel	Carter	Forest	Wisconsin		Land-based	Owned by the Forest County Potawatomi Community; formerly Potawatomi Northern Lights Bingo and Casino
St. Croix Casino Danbury	Danbury	Burnett	Wisconsin		Land-based	Owned by the St. Croix Chippewa Indians of Wisconsin
St. Croix Casino Hertel	Webster	Burnett	Wisconsin		Land-based	Owned by the St. Croix Chippewa Indians of Wisconsin; formerly Little Turtle Hertel Express
St. Croix Casino Turtle Lake	Turtle Lake	Barron	Wisconsin		Land-based	Owned by the St. Croix Chippewa Indians of Wisconsin
Sevenwinds Casino, Lodge & Convention Center	Hayward	Sawyer	Wisconsin		Land-based	Owned by the Lac Courte Oreilles Tribe; formerly Lac Courte Oreilles Casino, Lodge & Convention Center
Thunderbird Casino	Keshena	Menominee	Wisconsin		Land-based	Owned by the Menominee Indian Tribe of Wisconsin; separate part of Menominee Casino

== Gallery ==
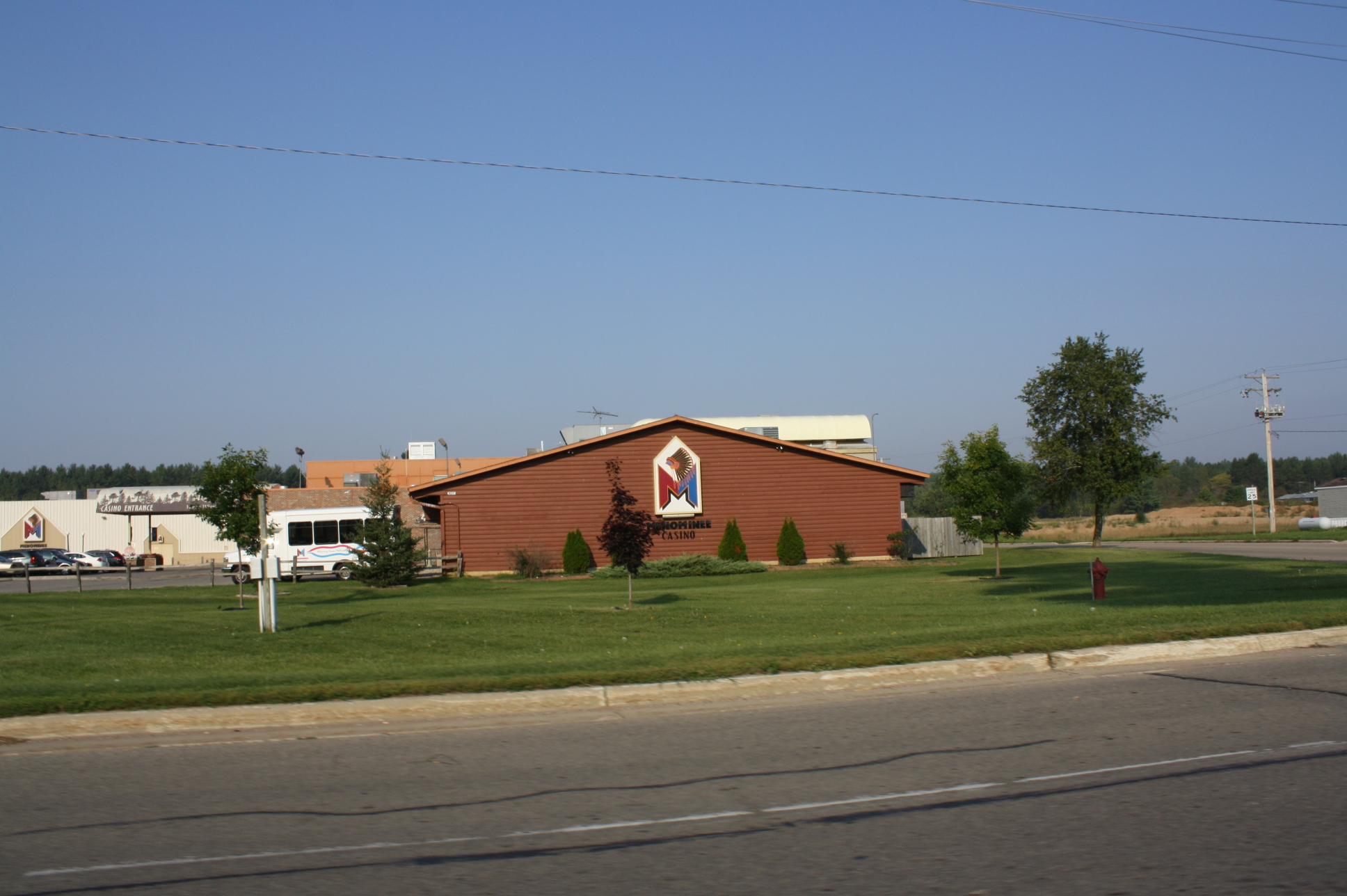
Menominee Casino and Bingo

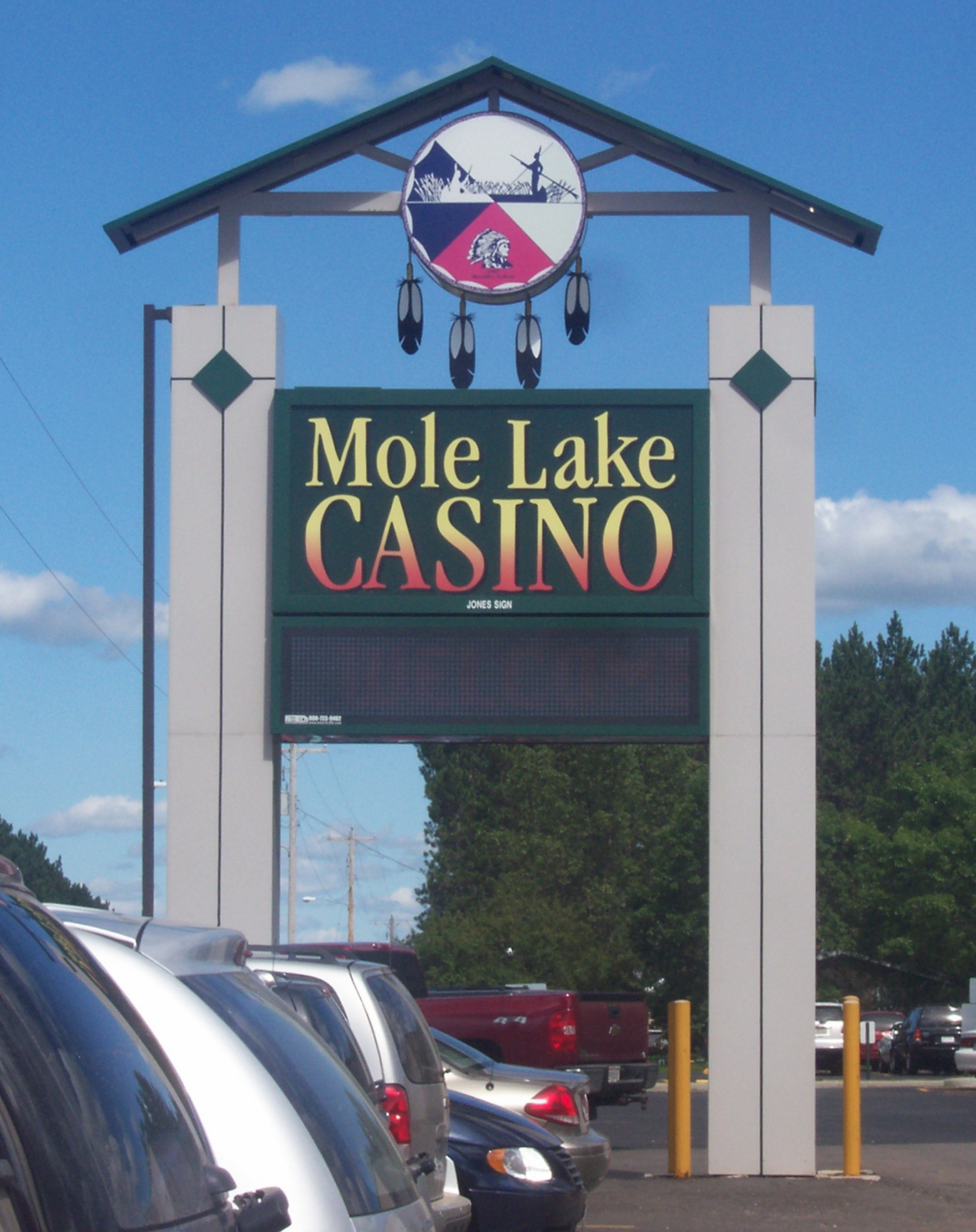
Mole Lake Casino sign

== See also ==
- List of casinos in the United States
- List of casino hotels
