= Tadeusz Rozwadowski =

Polish general (1866–1928)

Tadeusz Jordan-Rozwadowski
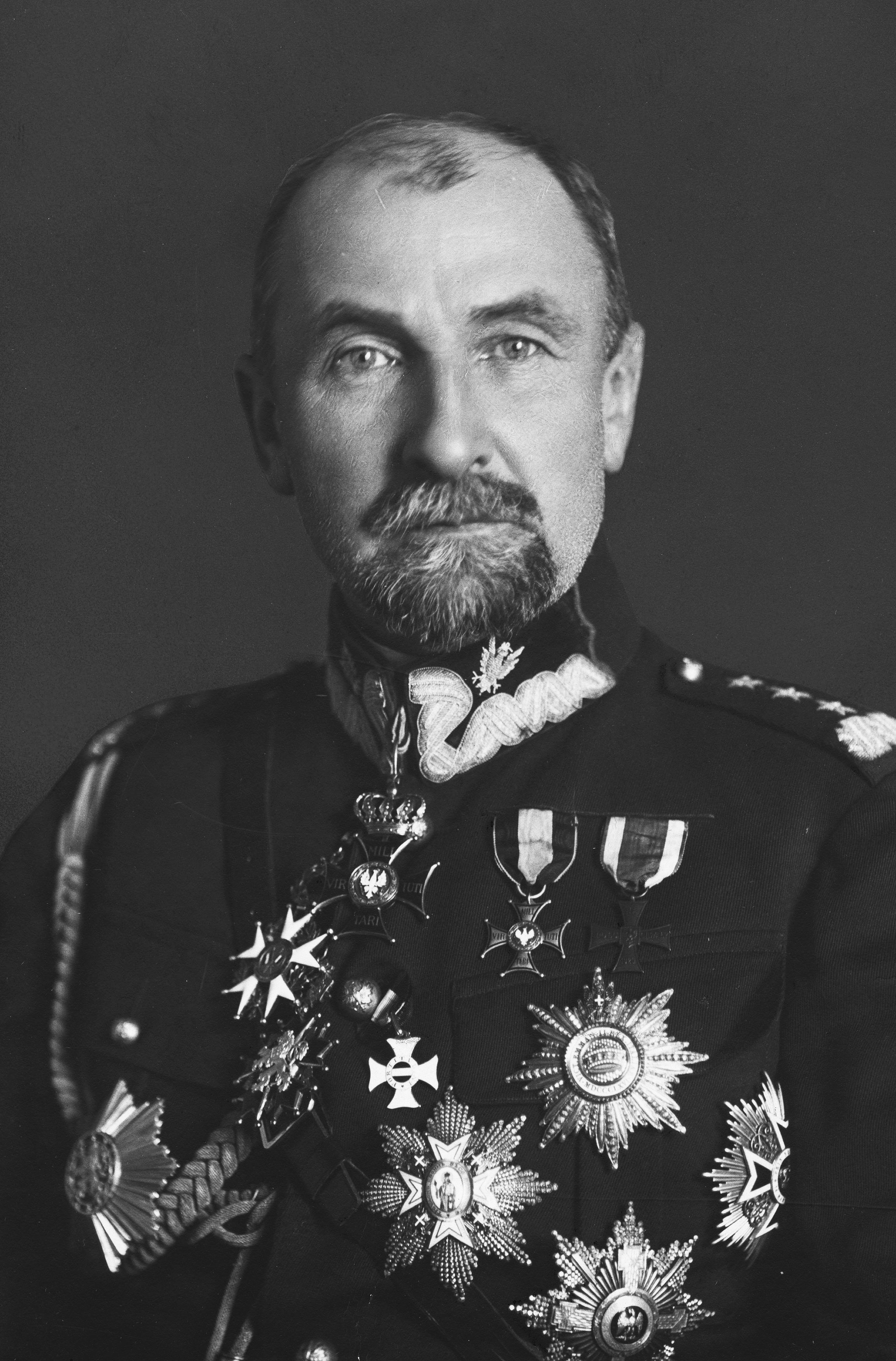
- Born: 19 May 1866; Babin, Galicia, Austria-Hungary
- Died: 18 October 1928 (aged 62); Warsaw, Poland
- Military career
- Allegiance: Austria-Hungary (1886–1918); Second Polish Republic (1918–1926)
- Branch: Austro-Hungarian Army; Polish Army
- Service years: 1886–1926
- Rank: General broni & Chief of the General Staff
- Conflicts: First World War; Polish–Ukrainian War; Polish–Soviet War

Count Tadeusz Samuel Szymon Jordan-Rozwadowski (19 May 1866 – 18 October 1928) was a Polish military commander, diplomat, and politician, a general of the Austro-Hungarian Army and then the Polish Army.

== Biography ==
=== Youth ===
Jordan-Rozwadowski was born in Babin, near Kałusz, Galicia, which formed part of the Austrian Empire (Austria-Hungary from 1867). The Jordan-Rozwadowski family was a member of the Polish nobility and a part of Traby clan (see Trąby coat of arms). In 1783, the family obtained the title of count from the Habsburg Emperor Joseph II in the nobility of the Holy Roman Empire and the Austrian nobility.

Tadeusz came from a family with a long military tradition. The 'Jordan' byname is supposedly a memento of a distant ancestor who during the Third Crusade was the first Pole to see the Jordan River. The general's ancestor, Maciej Rozwadowski, showed bravery at the Battle of Vienna in 1683. Tadeusz's great-grandfather, Kazimierz Jordan-Rozwadowski, was a brigadier general under Kościuszko, and fought against the last partition of Poland. His grandfather, Wiktor, fought in the November Uprising and was awarded the War Order of Virtuti Militari. His uncle Tadeusz was killed in the January Uprising. His father Tomisław fought in the January Uprising as a commander of the insurgent cavalry.

=== Officer in the Austro-Hungarian Army ===
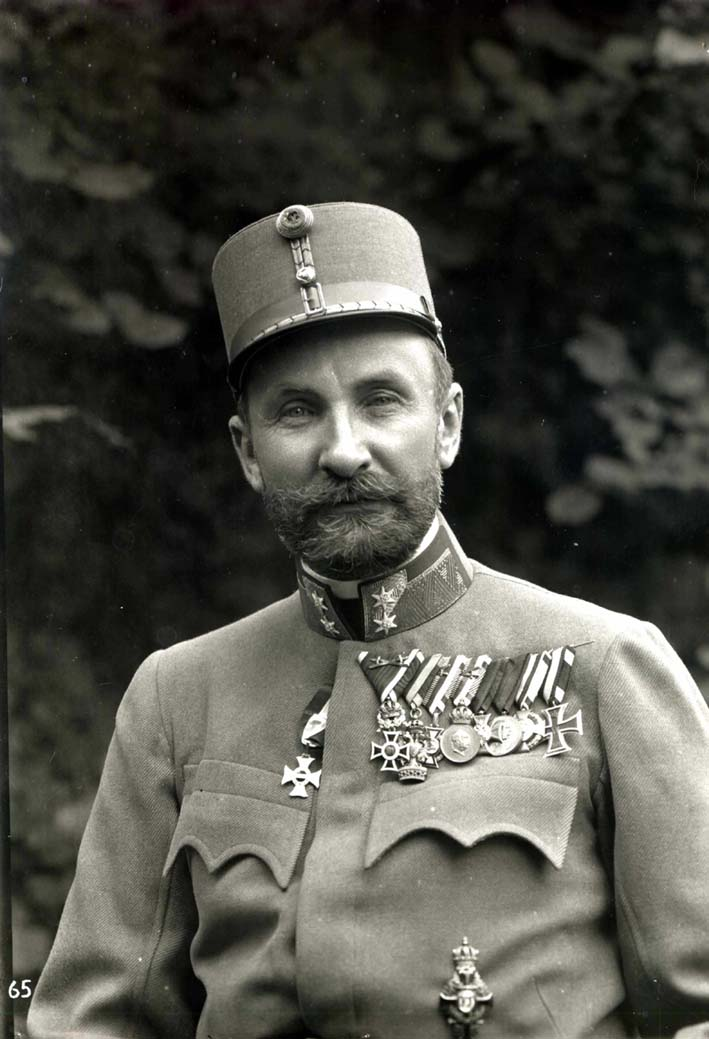
Rozwadowski in an Austro-Hungarian military uniform, 1918

Before the outbreak of World War I, Rozwadowski joined the Austro-Hungarian Army as an artillery officer . He and, later, his son were taught to ride at the famous Spanish Riding School in Vienna. Rozwadowski also served, for many years, as the Austrian military attaché in Bucharest, Romania. In 1914, he was appointed to command the 12th Artillery Brigade attached to the Kraków-based 12th Infantry Division. A skilled commander, he was then appointed to command the 43rd Infantry Division, which he led during the victorious battle of Gorlice. He was awarded the Military Order of Maria Theresa for his distinguished conduct in that battle. He is also credited with the discovery of an artillery barrage tactic called Feuerwalze – "Fire-roller". In the Austro-Hungarian Army he rose to the rank of Feldmarschalleutnant (Lieutenant General).

=== Beginnings of the service in Polish forces ===
On October 26, 1918 Rozwadowski became the Regency Council-nominated chief of staff of the Polnische Wehrmacht. After Poland regained independence, on November 15 of that year he resigned his post – and was assigned to the same duty within the newly restored Polish Army a week later. Until March 19, 1919 he was also the commanding officer of the Polish Eastern Army fighting on the fronts of the Polish-Ukrainian War in Galicia.

=== Head of the Polish military missions to Paris, London, Rome ===
He was then dispatched to Paris, where he took part in the Polish delegation to the Peace Conference and was one of the people to sign the Versailles Peace Treaty. He also headed numerous Polish military missions to Paris, London and Rome. In June he became the official representative of Polish armed forces in Paris and was influential in obtaining international support for Poland (for example, the volunteers for the Polish-American Kościuszko's Squadron).

=== Chief of Staff during the Battle of Warsaw ===
At the height of the Bolshevist Russian offensive in the Polish–Soviet War, on July 22, 1920, he returned to Poland and assumed the post of the Chief of General Staff and a member of the State Defence Council. Opinions among historians vary as to the extent to which he was responsible for developing the extremely successful plan for the battle of Warsaw that turned the tide of that war, also known as the "Miracle on the Vistula". He was certainly considering a similar plan. Some argue, however, that his input was even more important than that of Marshal of Poland, Józef Piłsudski, who is most often credited with turning the tide of the war. For his part in the war, Rozwadowski was awarded the Virtuti Militari (Classes II and V) and the Cross of the Valorous (four times).

After the end of hostilities he became the inspector-general of Polish cavalry units and authored the 1924 reform of the cavalry tactics and organization. He was also one of the early proponents of Polish tanks and airpower. In March 1921, Jordan-Rozwadowski made use of his contacts in Bucharest to help start the Polish–Romanian alliance, by negotiating a Convention on Defensive Alliance.

=== Imprisoned after Piłsudski's coup ===
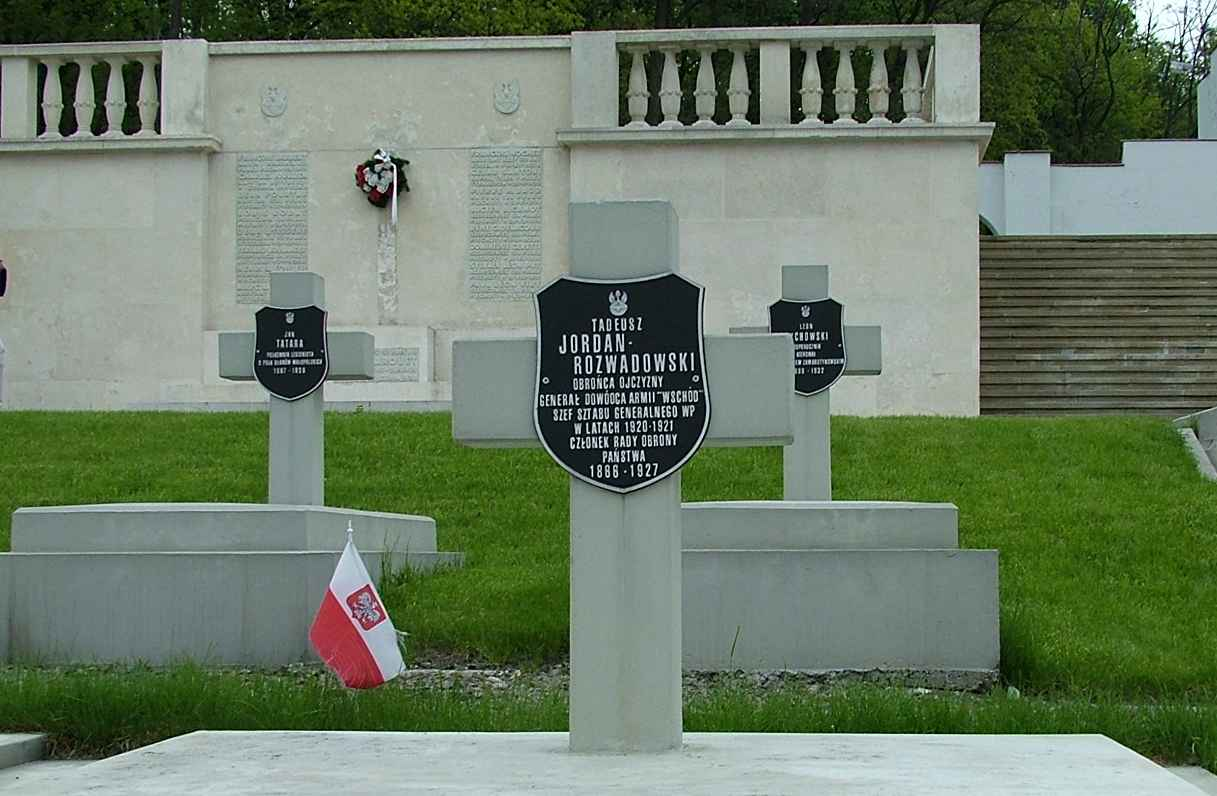
Gen. Rozwadowski's tomb in Lychakivskiy Cemetery, Lviv.

During the May Coup d'État of 1926 he was the commander of the forces loyal to the legal government and assumed the role of the military governor of Warsaw. He was responsible for all military actions of the government forces, including airstrikes that resulted in heavy casualties, including many fatal injuries (most victims were civilians). Air raids were ordered by Rozwadowski and organised by General Zagórski. After the victory of Józef Piłsudski Rozwadowski was arrested in Warsaw on May 15, 1926 and transferred with four other detained generals to a military prison in Antakalnis, Vilnius, where he was detained in very strict conditions, in an unheated cell, for more than a year, until May 18, 1927. General Zagórski, the most important witness, disappeared in unknown circumstances in 1927.

The press of the time repeated imprecise and false accusations of improper financial dealings during his service in the army. These allegations were never presented to him and remained only unsubstantiated rumors.

=== Death and the legacy ===
Soon after his release and retirement general Rozwadowski died in mysterious circumstances in a hospital in Warsaw. He was buried, amid rumours of poisoning, with full military honours at the Łyczaków Cemetery in Lwów (Lviv), among his fallen soldiers of the 1918–1919 Polish–Ukrainian War.

In the years following his death, the official Polish media sought to erase Tadeusz Rozwadowski's memory. This policy also prevailed under communist rule in Poland after World War II. Only since the fall of communism have historians in Poland been able to objectively examine the circumstances of the Battle of Warsaw, as well as Rozwadowski's life and contributions to the history of Poland and Europe. In 2019, he was named the patron of the 23rd Artillery Regiment, and in 2024 the 4th Logistic Center. In 2026, the statue dedicated to Rozwadowski was unveiled in Warsaw, in front of the building of the General Staff of the Polish Armed Forces. It was designed by Zbigniew Mikielewicz.

== Family ==
General Rozwadowski left behind a wife, a daughter, and a son. The greater part of his fortune was lost in a business venture to benefit the soldiers who fought under his command. His daughter, Melania Josefina, seems to have died under mysterious circumstances in the 1970s and never married. His son, Jozef, was an artillery officer in the Polish Army and was also awarded the Virtuti Militari. In the 1930s, he was forced to resign his commission and emigrate to the United States due to his continued support for the pro-democratic and anti-Piłsudski forces in Poland. He emigrated to the United States and worked as an engineer and designed the elevators in the Empire State Building. He also contributed to the design of the Polish Pavilion in the 1939 New York World's Fair and the 1964 World's Fair. He was survived by one daughter, Melanie Josephine, one granddaughter, Calia Brencsons-Van Dyk (see List of Latvians), and one great-grandson, Joseph Van Dyk, all living in the United States.

== Promotions ==
- Leutnant (Second lieutenant) - 18 August 1886
- Oberleutnant (First lieutenant) - 1891
- Hauptmann (Captain) - May 1894
- Major (Major) - 1 November 1900
- Oberstleutnant (Lieutenant colonel) - 1905
- Oberst (Colonel) - May 1908
- Generalmajor (Major general) - May 1913
- Feldmarschallleutnant (Lieutenant field marshal) - 1916
- Generał porucznik (Lieutenant general) - 1918
- Generał broni (General of the branch) - 1 April 1921

== Honours and awards ==
=== Polish ===
- Commander's Cross of the Order of Virtuti Militari (previously awarded the Silver Cross – 1921)
- Cross of Valour – four times
- Commander's Cross of the Order of Polonia Restituta

=== Austro-Hungarian ===
- Order of Maria Theresa Knight's Cross
- Grand Cross of the Order of Leopold with war decoration and swords
- Order of the Iron Crown 1st Class
- Order of Franz Joseph Officer
- Military Merit Cross 3rd Class with war decoration and swords
- Bronze Military Merit Medal with swords
- Long Service Cross for Officers
- 1908 Jubilee Cross
- 1898 Jubilee Medal

=== Foreign ===
- Commander of the Legion of Honour (France)
- Grand Cross of the Order of the Crown of Romania(Romania)
- Cross of Liberty, Class I (Estonia)
- Star of the Order of the White Lion (Czech Republic)
- Iron Cross 2nd Class (German Empire)
