= Juris (disambiguation) =

The Juris were a tribe of South American Indigenous people.

Juris may also refer to:

- Juris (name)
- Juris Doctor, a law degree
- Genitive singular case of Latin ius
- Juris magazine, the magazine of the Duquesne Law School
