= Statue of Tadeusz Rozwadowski =

Monument in Warsaw, Poland

- Interactive map of Statue of Tadeusz Rozwadowski
- Location: 4A Rakowiecka Street, Mokotów, Warsaw, Masovian Voivodeship, Poland
- Coordinates: 52°12′30.22″N 21°00′42.01″E
- Designer: Zbigniew Mikielewicz
- Type: Statue
- Material: Bronze (statue); sandstone (pedestal)
- Height: c. 5 m (16.4 ft; total)
- Opening date: 26 October 2026
- Dedicated to: Tadeusz Rozwadowski

The statue of Tadeusz Rozwadowski (Polish pronunciation: [taˈdɛ.uʂ rɔz.vaˈdɔf.ski]; Polish: Pomnik Tadeusza Rozwadowskiego) is a monument in the city of Warsaw in Masovian Voivodeship, Poland, within the Mokotów district. It is placed in front of the building of the General Staff of the Polish Armed Forces at 4A Rakowiecka Street, within the neighbourhood of Old Mokotów. The monument dedicated to Tadeusz Rozwadowski (1866–1928), a 19th- and 20th-century military officer and a general of the branch and the first Chief of the General Staff of the Polish Armed Forces in 1918 and from 1920 to 1921, accomplished with his command during the Battle of Warsaw in 1920, during the Polish–Soviet War. It has a form of his bronze statue placed on a pedestal. The monument was designed by Zbigniew Mikielewicz, and unveiled on 26 October 2026.

== History ==
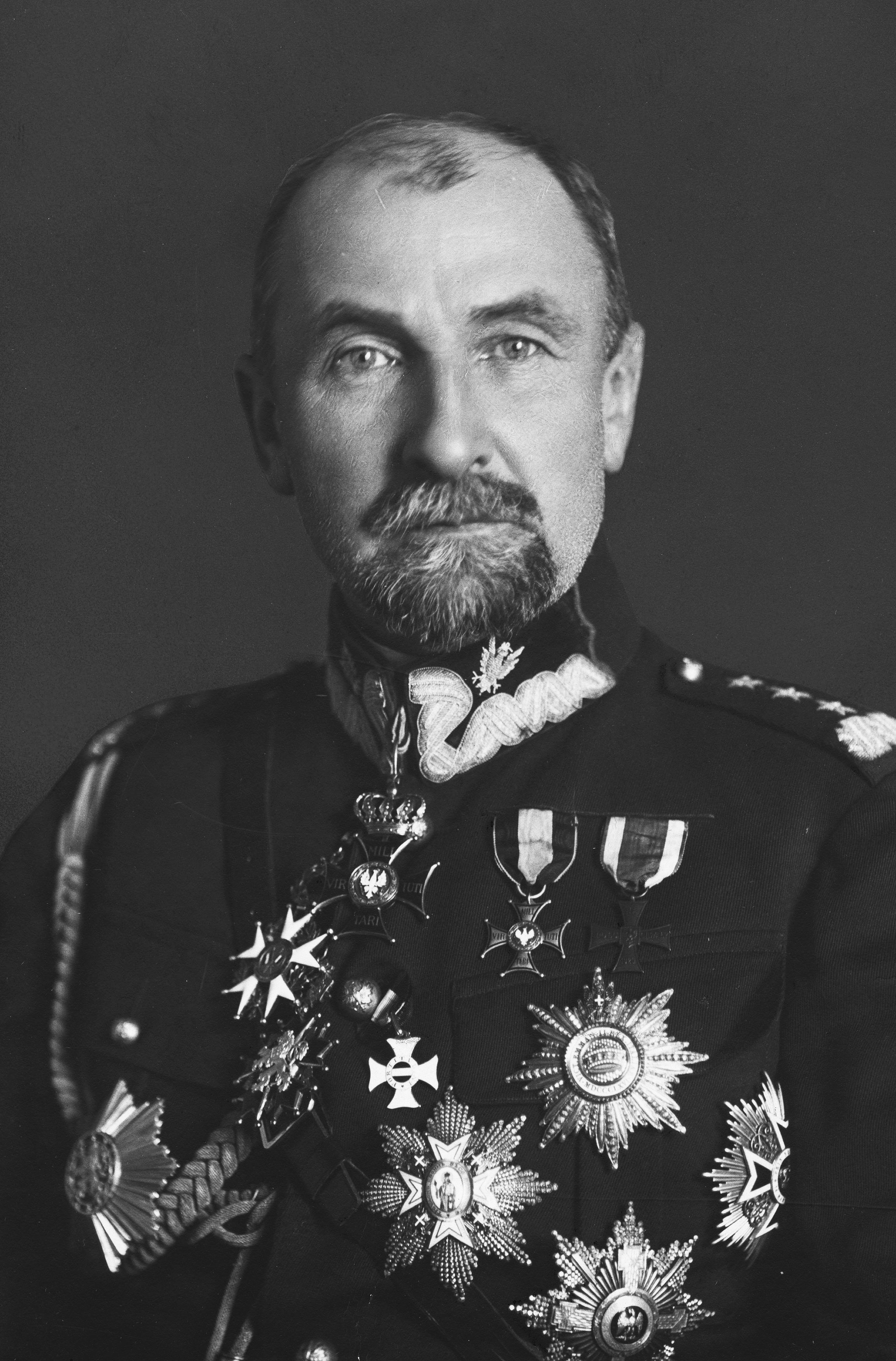
Tadeusz Rozwadowski, the subject of the monument.

The monument is dedicated to Tadeusz Rozwadowski (1866–1928), a 19th- and 20th-century military officer and a general of the branch and the first Chief of the General Staff of the Polish Armed Forces in 1918 and from 1920 to 1921. He was accomplished with his command during the Battle of Warsaw in 1920, during the Polish–Soviet War.

The monument was designed by sculptor and architect Zbigniew Mikielewicz. Its cornerstone was laid down in front of the building of the General Staff of the Polish Armed Forces in Warsaw on 24 October 2025. Pieces of sandstone from the original façade of the building of the General Staff of the Polish Armed Forces from 1918, were used in the construction of the pedestal. The finished monument was unveiled on 26 October 2026, a day after the celebrations of the General Staff of the Polish Armed Forces. The year 2026 marked the 160th anniversary of Rozwadowski's birth, and was declared in his commemoration. The unveiling ceremony was attended by Władysław Kosiniak-Kamysz, the Deputy Prime Minister of Poland and the Minister of National Defence, and Wiesław Kukuła, the Chief of the General Staff of the Polish Armed Forces. A letter written by Karol Nawrocki, the President of Poland, was also read out.

== Characteristics ==
The monument is placed in front of the building of the General Staff of the Polish Armed Forces. It features a bronze statue of Tomasz Rozwadowski, dressed in a military uniform of a general of the branch of Polish Armed Forces, with a rogatywka hat and a sabre attaced to his belt on a side of his right leg. In in left hand, he holds binoculars, held at the heigh of his shoulders. According to the author, it symbolises that "one should always look forward". The statue is facing towards Rakowiecka Street and the Belvedere Palace. It is placed on top of a pedestal, made out of three vertical cuboids. The one in the centre is larger than the two surrounding each on both sides. The latter two are made from the sandstone, sourced from the pieces of the original façade of the building of the General Staff of the Polish Armed Forces from 1918. The monument has a total height of around 5 m (16.4 ft). The pedestal is decorated with bronze sculptures of Rozwadowski's military awards, featuring the Cross of Valour and the Order of Polonia Restituta on the left block, and the Commander's Cross of the War Order of Virtuti Militari on the right block. The central block features a Polish-language inspiration which reads:

Polish inscription

Generał broni
Tadeusz Jordan-Rozwadowski
1866–1928
Pierwszy Szef Sztabu Generalnego Wojska Polskiego

Translation:
English translation

General of the branch
Tadeusz Jordan-Rozwadowski
1866–1928
The first Chief of the General Staff of the Polish Armed Forces
