= Ēriks Ešenvalds =

Latvian composer

- Born: 26 January 1977 (age 49); Priekule, Latvian SSR, Soviet Union (now Latvia)
- Occupations: Composer, speaker
- Website: EriksEsenvalds.com

Ēriks Ešenvalds (born 26 January 1977) is a Latvian composer, mainly of choral music. From 2011 to 2013 he was Fellow Commoner in Creative Arts at Trinity College, University of Cambridge.

== Biography and career ==
Ēriks Ešenvalds was born in Priekule, Latvia, in 1977. He studied at the Latvian Baptist Theological Seminary (1995–1997) before obtaining his master's degree in composition (2004) from the Latvian Academy of Music under the tutelage of Selga Mence. He took master classes with Michael Finnissy, Klaus Huber, Philippe Manoury and Jonathan Harvey, amongst others.

From 2002 to 2011 he was a member of the State Choir Latvija. From 2011 to 2013 he was Fellow Commoner in Creative Arts at Trinity College, University of Cambridge. Ešenvalds is a three-time winner of the Latvian Grand Music Award (2005, 2007 and 2015). In 2006, the International Rostrum of Composers awarded him first prize for his work The Legend of the Walled-in Woman. Ešenvalds composed the official anthem of the 2014 World Choir Games during Riga European Capital of Culture 2014. Ešenvalds teaches at the Department of Composition of the Latvian Academy of Music.

In April 2024, Ešenvalds visited the United States to serve as composer-in-residence for the North American premiere of his major choral-orchestral work St. Luke Passion. The concert took place on April 13, 2024, at the University of Virginia in Charlottesville, Virginia. Performed by the University Singers in Old Cabell Hall and conducted by Michael Slon, the concert also featured two of Ešenvalds's other works, "Stars" and "Only in Sleep."

== Recordings ==
Ešenvalds's compositions appear on recordings released by labels such as Signum Records, Hyperion Records, Decca Classics, Deutsche Grammophon, Delphian Records, Pentatone and Ondine.

Recordings devoted exclusively to his work include:

- Passion and Resurrection & other choral works — Britten Sinfonia, Polyphony and Stephen Layton (Hyperion Records, 2011)
- O Salutaris — Kamēr Youth Choir and Māris Sirmais (2011)
- At the Foot of the Sky — State Choir Latvija and Māris Sirmais (2013)
- Northern Lights & Other Choral Works — Choir of Trinity College, Cambridge and Stephen Layton (Hyperion Records, 2015)
- St Luke Passion & Other Sacred Works — Latvian Radio Choir, Sinfonietta Rīga and Sigvards Kļava (Ondine, 2016)
- The Doors of Heaven — Portland State University Chamber Choir under Ethan Sperry (Naxos, 2017)
- There Will Come Soft Rains — The Pacific Lutheran University Choir of the West, Richard Nance (cond.) (Signum, 2020)
- Translations — Portland State University under Ethan Sperry (Naxos, 2020)

The 2011 album, Passion and Resurrection & other choral works, includes the choral piece "The Long Road", one of Ešenvalds' most popular and frequently-played compositions. Dedicated to conductor Stephen Layton and his choir Polyphony, it is adapted from a love poem by Latvian poet Paulīna Bārda (1890–1983), with an English translation by Elaine Singley Lloyd.

The album Northern Lights & Other Choral Works was short-listed for the Gramophone Awards 2015, selected as Gramophone Critics' Choice 2015 and listed as ICI Radio-Canada Best Albums Selection in 2015. The albums At the Foot of the Sky (2013) and O Salutaris (2011) were awarded Best Classical Album of the Year in Latvia.

== See also ==
- List of Latvians
- Lists of composers
