= Ho-Chunk Casino =

Native American casino in Wisconsin, US

Coordinates: 43.528836°N 89.77474°W

Ho-Chunk Gaming – Wisconsin Dells
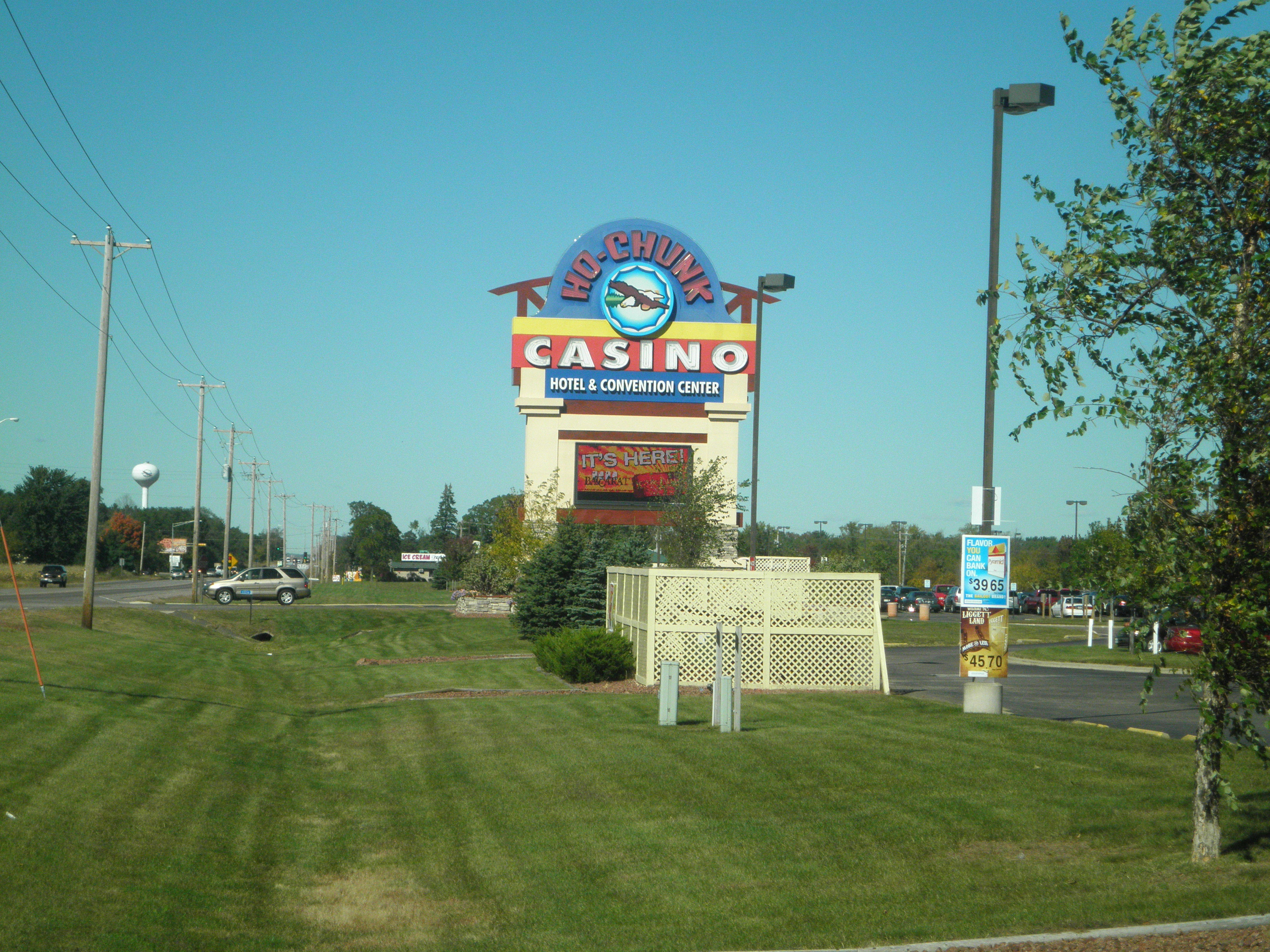
- Interactive map of Ho-Chunk Gaming – Wisconsin Dells
- Location: S3214 Cty Rd BD Baraboo, Wisconsin 53913
- Opened: November 1, 2008; 17 years ago
- No. of rooms: 302
- Gaming space: 94,500 square feet (8,780 m^{2})
- Notable restaurants: Jose's Authentic Mexican Restaurant; Spirit Bar; Ho-Chunk Grill
- Casino type: Native American gambling enterprises
- Owner: Ho-Chunk Nation of Wisconsin
- Previous names: Ho-Chunk Casino Hotel and Convention Center
- Website: https://www.ho-chunkgaming.com/wisconsindells/

Ho-Chunk Gaming – Wisconsin Dells is a Native American casino and hotel located in the Town of Delton, Wisconsin, between Wisconsin Dells and Baraboo. The casino is owned by the Ho-Chunk Nation of Wisconsin, one of six Ho-Chunk casinos in the state and one of the three largest. It is a Class III casino.

== Description ==
There are over 2,000 slot machines and 48 table games. The casino is open 24 hours Thurs-Mon/Tues-Wed 9am-1am, seven (7) days a week. The hotel has 302 rooms. Conference rooms or event venues are available for rental. An RV park with full hookup sites and tent camping is available.

=== Restaurants ===
Ho-Chunk Gaming Wisconsin Dells has the following restaurants:

- Ho-Chunk Grill
- Spirit Bar
- Jose's Authentic Mexican Restaurant

== History ==
The casino was previously known as the Ho-Chunk Casino Hotel and Convention Center. The name was changed to Ho-Chunk Gaming in 2010. In 2016, the facility broke ground on a multi-million expansion project.

The casino closed for over two months in 2020 during the COVID-19 pandemic. It reopened in June 2020 with protocols for face masks, social distancing, and sanitization.

In 2021, a technical issue forced all Ho-Chunk gaming centers to close for a weekend. The official statement did not specify if it was an internal or external issue, but officials said they did not find evidence that anyone's personal information was at risk.

== See also ==
- List of casinos in Wisconsin
- List of casino hotels
