= Tom Jones (artist) =

Ho-Chunk artist

Tom Jones (born 1964) is a Ho-Chunk artist, curator, and professor of photography at the University of Wisconsin. His work explores representation of contemporary Native American culture with a focus on his own tribe, the Ho-Chunk Nation of Wisconsin.

== Background ==
Jones was born in North Carolina in 1964 but was raised in places like Orlando and Minneapolis. He's originally from Wisconsin. His mother, JoAnn, was the first female president of the Ho-Chunk Nation of Wisconsin in 1994. Jones has been a UW-Madison faculty member since 2005. His work is included in the National Museum of the American Indian.
