= Saule (given name) =

Name list

- Gender: Female

Origin
- Origin: Kazakh
- Region of origin: Turkic

Saule (Kazakh: Сәуле) is a traditional Kazakh female given name. Notable people with the name include:

- Saule Doszhan (born 1959), Kazakh poetess and writer
- Saule Iskakova (born 1972), Russian singer and actress
- Saule Omarova (born 1966), American attorney, academic, and public policy advisor
