= Potawatomi Hotel Casino =

Hotel in Milwaukee, United States

Potawatomi Casino & Hotel

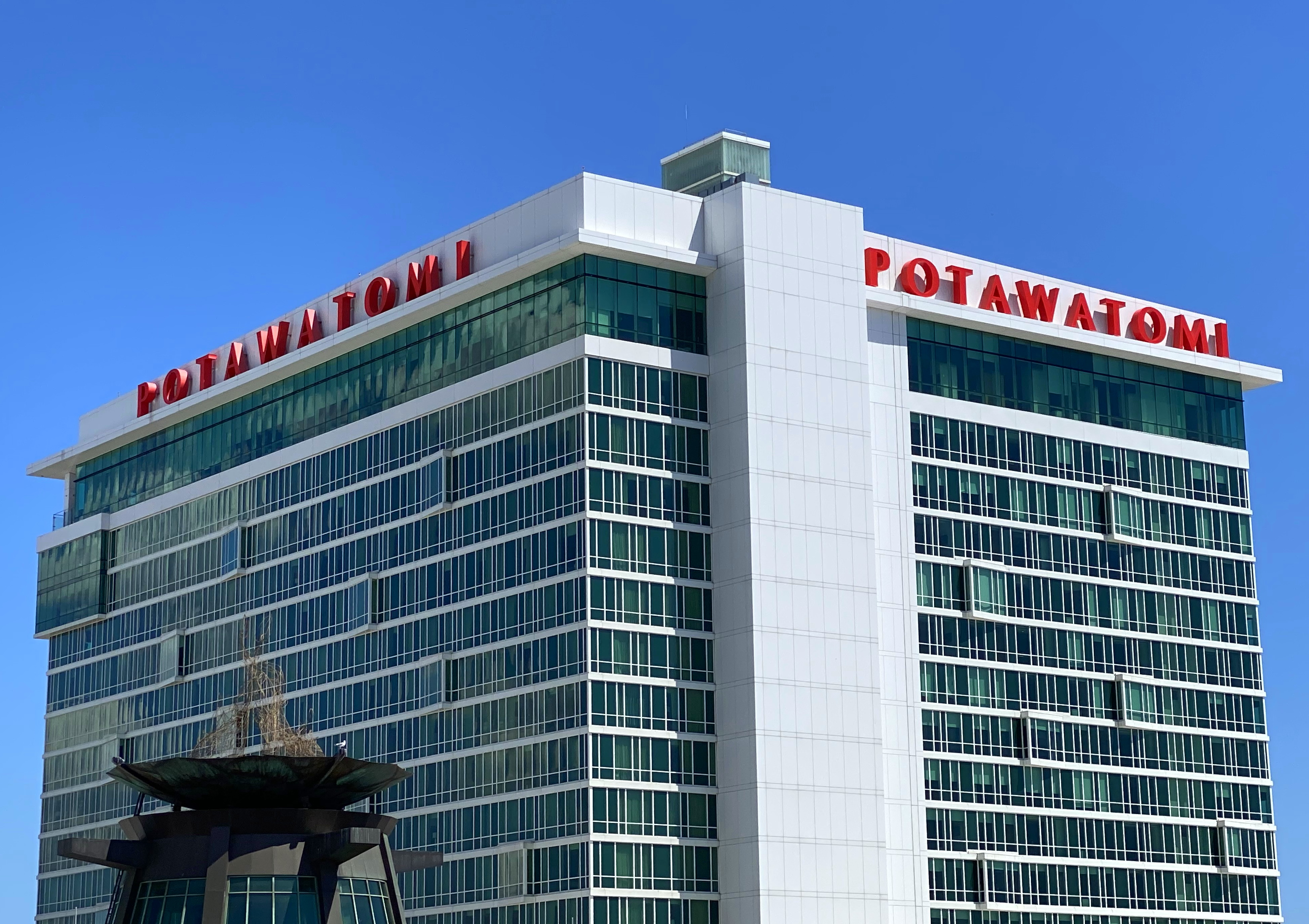
- Interactive map of Potawatomi Casino & Hotel
- Location: 1721 West Canal Street Milwaukee, Wisconsin 53233; 43.030418°N 87.934822°W
- Opened: March 7, 1991
- No. of rooms: 500
- Notable restaurants: Rock & Brews, Dream Dance Steakhouse, RuYi, Canal Street Cafe, Cream City Coffee
- Owner: Forest County Potawatomi Community
- Previous names: Potawatomi Bingo Casino
- Public transit access: MCTS
- Website: paysbig.com

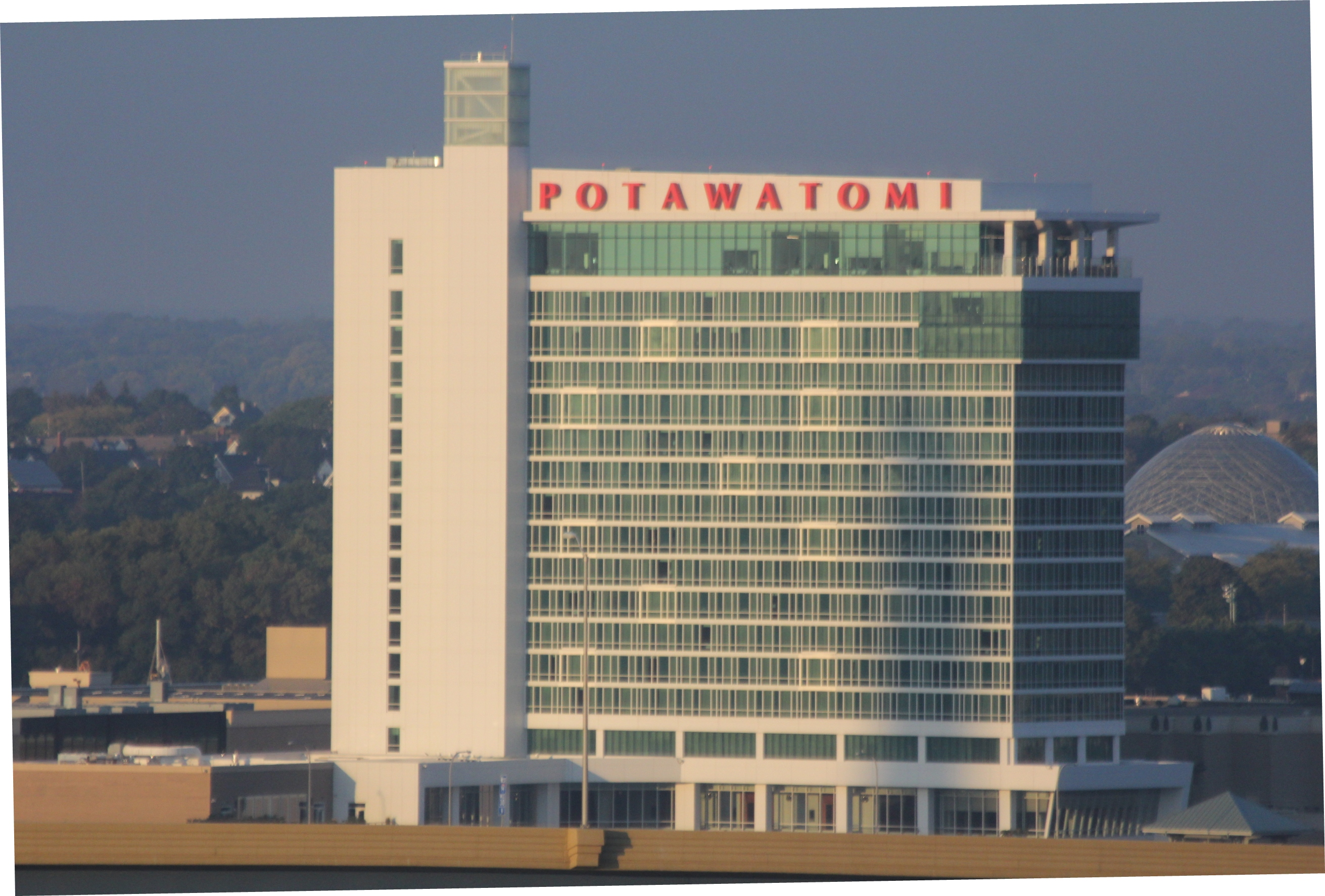
Casino in 2015

Potawatomi Casino Hotel, formerly Potawatomi Bingo Casino, is a Native American casino in Milwaukee, Wisconsin, United States, owned and operated by the Forest County Potawatomi Community. The building stands at a height of 264 feet (80.5m) and it first opened its doors March 7, 1991. Located on Canal Street in the Menomonee Valley near Downtown Milwaukee, this entertainment destination offers a variety of entertainment options, including a 20-table poker room, multiple restaurants and dining options, a food court (with several vendors/small restaurants), and a sportsbook venue which is the only legal sports betting venue in the Milwaukee area, and requiring physical presence on the property in order to place a bet.

== History ==
The casino underwent an expansion that was completed in the summer of 2008, expanding the number of table games to 60 and slot machines to over 3,000. The connected hotel stands eighteen stories high (numbered as nineteen due to the common exclusion of the thirteenth floor), and is the tallest habitable structure in the city west of Interstate 94 (with the roof of American Family Field nearby standing 70 feet higher).

In May 2017, Potawatomi Hotel Casino announced that it wants to expand the hotel with the construction of a second tower. The second tower is expected to cost around $80 million and will house 119 rooms and suites, bringing the hotel's total number to 500. The 180,000-square-foot addition will also feature a spa and additional meeting space. It opened for business in the spring of 2019.

== Gaming ==
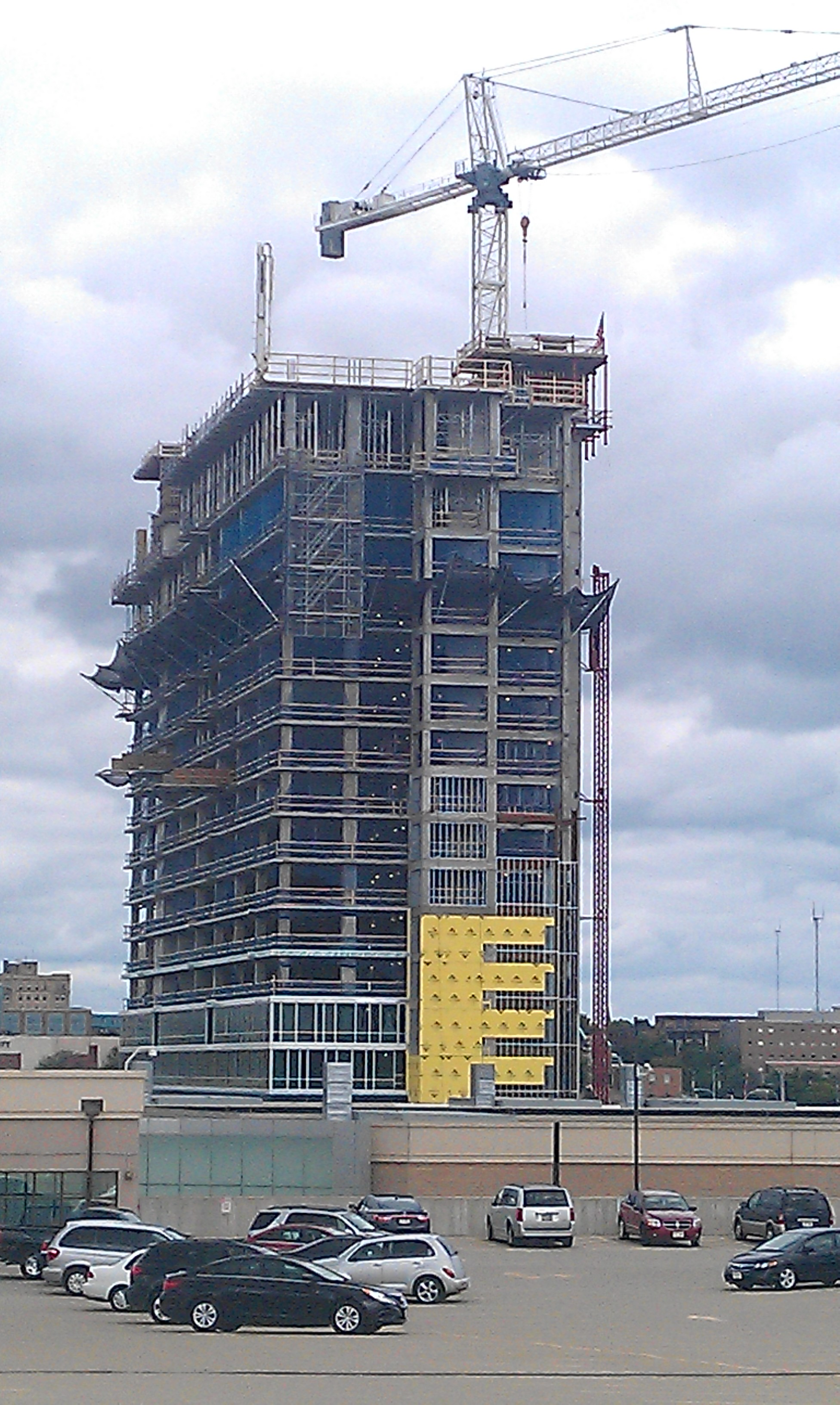
The Potawatomi Casino Hotel under construction

The Potawatomi Casino has one of the largest gaming floors in all of Wisconsin. There are more than 3,000 machines for gaming as well as 100 poker and table games.

The 24/7 poker room includes a mix of Limit and No-Limit Texas Hold ’Em, Seven Card Stud, and Pot Limit Omaha.

== See also ==
- List of casinos in Wisconsin
- List of casino hotels
- Tending the Fire
