= Tending the Fire =

Milwaukee sculpture

- Artist: MJM Studios
- Year: 2000
- Type: bronze
- Location: Potawatomi Bingo Casino; Milwaukee, Wisconsin; 43°1′53.196″N 87°56′5.44″W
- Owner: Potawatomi Historical and Cultural Board

Tending the Fire is a public art work produced by MJM Studios located on the south side of Milwaukee, Wisconsin in the Menomonee Valley. The bronze sculpture depicts a Native American figure seated near a small fire.

== Description ==
The figure has a bare torso and wears fringed pants. His hair is parted in the center, and two long braids reach down across his chest. Three eagle feathers extend from the back of his head, two facing upward and one facing downward. He is seated on the ground with his legs crossed in front of him. His back is curved forward. Both arms rest across his ankles. In one hand, he holds a twig toward the fire. His gaze is directed toward the space above the fire, which is an arrangement of logs that radiate outward from a center point and flames that reach skyward in a pyramidical form.

== Commissioning process ==
The Potawatomi Historical and Cultural Board commissioned MJM Studios to produce the sculpture for the new Potawatomi Bingo Casino in 2000. The sculpture recognizes the Potawatomi tribe's heritage as "keepers of the sacred fire," a role derived from Neshnabé legend. The design of the sculpture is based on archival photographs.

== Location ==
MJM Studios produced two Tending the Fire statues. One is installed in front of the main entrance to the casino, and the other is installed at the administrative office on S. 13th St. and St. Paul Ave.
