= Saules =

Saules may refer to several places:

in France

  - Saules, Doubs, a commune of the Doubs département
  - Saules, Saône-et-Loire, a commune of the Saône-et-Loire département

in Switzerland

  - Saules, Switzerland, a municipality in the canton of Berne
  - Saules, Neuchâtel, a village in the municipality of Fenin-Vilars-Saules

== See also ==
- Saule (disambiguation)
