= Valdis Zeps =

Latvian linguist and professor

Dr. Valdis Zeps
- Born: May 29, 1932; Daugavpils, Latvia
- Died: July 25, 1996 (aged 64); Riga, Latvia
- Education: Miami University (PhD)
- Occupation: Linguist • professor

Dr. Valdis Juris Zeps (May 29, 1932 – July 25, 1996) was a Latvian-American linguist and college professor.

== Early life and family ==
Valdis was born on May 29, 1932, in Daugavpils, Latvia. His parents, Jāzeps and Anna Zeps, were World War II refugees. In 1944, he fled the Soviet occupation of Latvia with his parents and brother, Aivars Zeps. They arrived first in the displaced persons camp of Lübeck, Germany, then, after receiving sponsorship, arrived in the United States in 1949.

Valdis married Betty Reel Shuford, a costume designer, in 1957. Their children are Dace, Valdis, Barbara, and William; grandchildren, Sandra, Andrew, Guntis, Monika, and Leo; great-grandchild, William.

== Career ==
Valdis studied at Miami University in Oxford, Ohio and received his doctorate in linguistics and sociology from Indiana University Bloomington in 1961. He became a professor of linguistics at the University of Wisconsin–Madison in 1963. He was widely published, in over 130 publications and journals, on such topics as Latvian folksong metrics, the Latvian language, and the exile of the Latgalians. He wrote Ķēves dēls Kurbads under the pseudonym Jānis Turbads. In 1984, he published The placenames of Latgola: A dictionary of East Latvian toponyms.

In the 1990s, Valdis also served with distinction as a member of the Ho-Chunk Language & Culture Program board in Mauston, Wisconsin, working with members of the Ho-Chunk Nation of Wisconsin to navigate the many options for a new Ho-Chunk language spelling system. In 1994, he compiled a large lexicon of the Ho-Chunk language, which came to be fondly known as the "Zepsicon".

Valdis died on July 25, 1996, in Riga, Latvia.

== Bibliography ==
Articles

- Folk Meter and Latvian Verse in Lituanus. 18:2 (1972) pages 10–26.
- Is Slavic a West Baltic Language? in General Linguistics. (1985) pages 213–222..
- What’s Instant Coffee in Latvian? in Lituanus 33:3 (1987) pages 25–36.

Books:

- Phoneme subsystems and correspondences in Cheremis dialects, 1960
- Concordance and Thesaurus of Cheremis Poetic Language (Janua Linguarum) with Thomas A. Sebeok, 1961
- Latvian and Finnic linguistic convergences (Indiana University publication. Uralic and Altaic series), 1962
- The placenames of Latgola: A dictionary of East Latvian toponyms (Wisconsin Baltic studies). 1984
