= Pāvels Gumennikovs =

Latvian film director, actor, writer, and producer

Pāvels Gumennikovs (born January 1, 1986) is a Latvian film director, actor, writer, and producer.

== Career ==
Gumennikovs started his film career in China, where he directed his first film Kaleidoscope (2010). He won a best young director and best film award in the Chinese Young Film Director Festival. Back in Latvia, Gumennikovs directed the film I love You Riga.

In 2012, Gumennikovs directed the TV show Yes Boss (2012), It was the Latvian series shot in large scale outside locations. Yes Boss Show was shown on Muz-TV channel and TV5 and was seen by 300,000 people online.
