= Saule Doszhan =

Kazakh writer

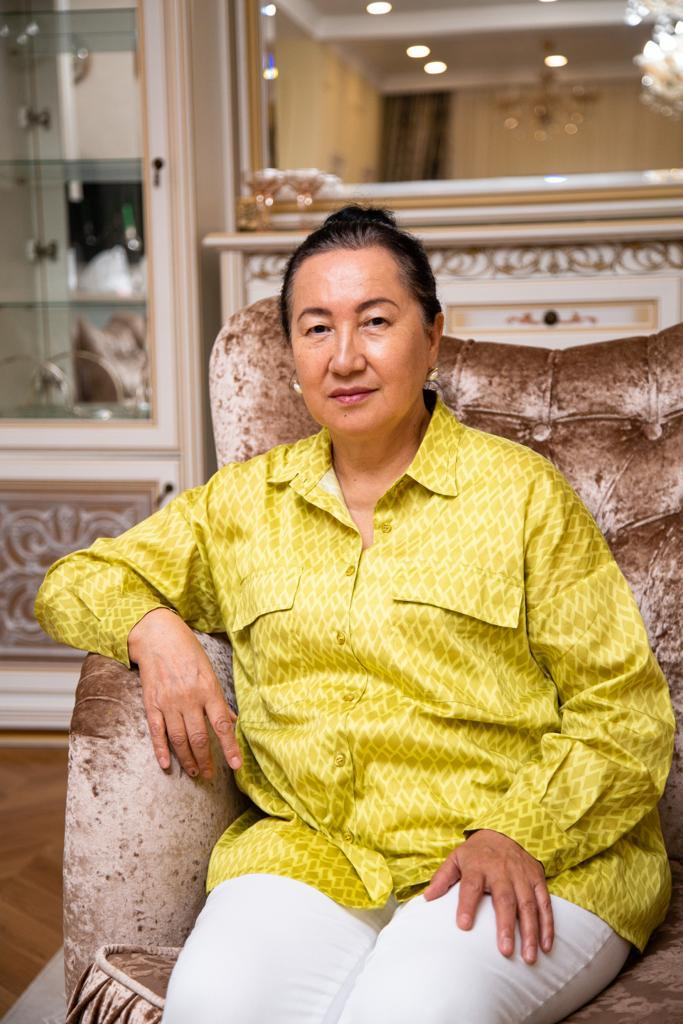
- Born: 2 September 1959 (age 66); Almaty Region, Uygur District, Aqtam village
- Citizenship: Kazakhstan
- Partner: Sat Tokpakbaev
- Children: Raigul Doszhan (1982), Ainur Doszhan (1988), Assel Doszhan (1993)

Saule Doszhan (Kazakh: Сәуле Мағазбекқызы Досжан, Säule Mağazbekqyzy Dosjan; born 2 September 1959) is a Kazakh poet, writer, and Honored Worker of Kazakhstan. She is a laureate of the international literary prize "Alash" and other republican competitions in the field of literature, a member of the Union of Writers of Kazakhstan, the Union of Journalists of Kazakhstan, and the International Women's Writing Guild (IWWG). She is the author of the short story "The tragedy of a bastard", nominated for the literary Booker Prize in 2019. Works of Doszhan have been published in Russian, English, Arabic, Spanish, French, German and Japanese, Kyrgyz languages. She was awarded the Order of Parasat and is a member of the National Kurultai under the President of the Republic of Kazakhstan.

== Biography ==
Saule Doszhan was born on 2 September 1959, in Aqtam village of the Uighur district in Almaty Region. From 1974 her poems and articles were published in the regional newspapers. She graduated from her school in Aqtam with honors. She graduated from the Kazakh State University, Journalism Faculty in 1987. While studying at the university, she became a laureate of the Zhiger Festival at the "Zhiger" festival, entered the collection of young poets "Audience", "Nine Keys", "Karlygash". She worked for the Socialist Kazakhstan (Egemen Kazakhstan) newspaper and the Kazakh radio. She served as the deputy editor-in-chief of the "Kazakh language and literature" newspaper and was the first editor of the Ulagat magazine. From 2003 she was Senior Officer of the Mazhilis of the Parliament of the Republic of Kazakhstan.

She is a member of the Writers' Union of Kazakhstan, the Union of Journalists and the International Women's Writing Guild.

== Awards ==
- 2001 – Winner of Anuar Baizhanbayev Prize of the Union of Journalists of Kazakhstan for the 10th anniversary of Independence.
- 2002 – Received the Grand Prix of the National Defender competition, which was co-organized by the Parliament and the Ministry of Defense of the Republic of Kazakhstan.
- 2006 – Awarded the jubilee medal "10 years of the Parliament of the Republic of Kazakhstan."
- 2009 – Awarded with the "Cultural luminary" medal by the Ministry of Culture.
- 2010 – Won the national contest in the genre of in the national "My country, my heart" poetry contest organized by the Nur Otan National Democratic Party.
- 2011 – She won third place in the "Call for Independence" National Poetry Contest.
- 2011 – Named "Honorary Citizen of Uighur district of Almaty region."
- 2013 – Won the second prize at the jubilee song contest "Shine, New Astana" dedicated to the 15th anniversary of Astana.
- 2014 – Won the "Military songs" competition at the radio festival with her song "March of the soldiers."
- 2015 – Awarded with the "20 years of the Assembly of People of Kazakhstan" medal.
- 2015 – Awarded the title Honored Worker of Kazakhstan by the Decree of the President.
- 2016 – Awarded the "25 years of Independence of the Republic of Kazakhstan" medal.
- 2016 – Winner "The Best Poet" nomination in the "Independence.Literature.Writer" Forum dedicated to the 25th anniversary of Kazakhstan's independence.
- 2017 – Won third place in the prose category at Open Eurasian Literature Festival & Book Forum-2017 (Sweden) for her book "Strange heart."
- 2018 – won First Prize in the National "The capital – bulwark of the nation" Poetry Contest dedicated to the 20th anniversary of Astana.
- 2018 – she was nominated in October for the 2019 Man Booker International Prize.

== Works ==
- 2000 – "Jyr Crown" (poetry) / Atamura publishing house;
- 2006 – "The secret of the third door" (prose) / Kazinform publishing house;
- 2008 – "Baby born to the womb" (prose) / Foliant "publishing house;
- 2011 – "Arman kala" / (poetry) Kazygurt publishing house;
- 2013 – "Fear in the Great House Fear" (prose) / Zhazushy publishing house;
- 2014 – "Master Almighty Pen" (prose) / Foliant publishing house;
- 2015 – "My only partner" (poetry) / Dastur publishing house;
- 2015 – "Strange heart" (prose) / Foliant publishing house;
- 2016 – "Strange hear" (prose) in Russian / Foliant publishing house;
- 2017 – "Sagynysh" (Prose)/ Hertfordshire Press, London
- Author of "Maimak kaz" cartoon and about 20 songs.
- 2018 – The book "Strange heart" in German was presented within the international forum "Modern Kazakh Culture in the Global World" hosted in Berlin
