= Christine Dzidrums =

American children's author

Christine Dzidrums is an American children's author. She won a bronze medal at the 2010 Moonbeam Children's Book Awards for her debut novel, Cutters Don't Cry. She has written sport biographies on Clayton Kershaw, Mike Trout, Gabby Douglas, Shawn Johnson, The Fierce Five, Missy Franklin, Kelly Clarkson and Nastia Liukin. Her second young adult novel, Kaylee: The "What If?" Game, won a gold medal at the 2014 Children's Literary Classics Awards. Her biography on Olympic figure skating champion Kim Yuna brought her media attention in South Korea.

Christine Dzidrums revealed in 2011 that she is a reformed cutter. She wrote on her official website that Cutters Don't Cry is "the closest to any autobiographical novel" as she would ever write.

== Bibliography ==
- Cutters Don't Cry, 2010
- Joannie Rochette: Canadian Ice Princess (SkateStars Volume 1), 2010
- Yuna Kim: Ice Queen, (SkateStars Volume 2), 2011
- Princess Dessabelle Makes a Friend, 2011
- Timmy and the Baseball Birthday Party, 2012
- Shawn Johnson: Gymnastics Golden Girl (GymnStars Volume 1), 2012
- Timmy Adopts a Girl Dog, 2012
- Fair Youth: Emylee of Forest Springs, 2012
- Nastia Liukin: Ballerina of Gymnastics (GymnStars Volume 2), 2012
- Princess Dessabelle: Tennis Star, 2012
- The Fab Five: Jordyn Wieber, Gabby Douglas, and the U.S. Women's Gymnastics Team (GymnStars Volume 3), 2012
- Gabby Douglas: Golden Smile, Golden Triumph (GymnStars Volume 4), 2012
- Future Presidents Club: Girls Rule!, 2013
- Idina Menzel: Broadway Superstar, 2013
- Sutton Foster: Broadway Sweetheart, 2013
- Clayton Kershaw: Pitching Ace, 2013
- Mike Trout: Baseball Sensation, 2013
- Matt Kemp: True Blue Baseball Star
- 66: The Yasiel Puig Story
- Jennie Finch: Softball Superstar (Y Not Girl Volume 1), 2013
- Kelly Clarkson: Behind Her Hazel Eyes (Y Not Girl Volume 2), 2013
- Missy Franklin: Swimming Sensation (Y Not Girl Volume 3), 2013
- Future Presidents Club: Girls Rock, 2014
- Kaylee: The "What If?" Game, 2014
- Mary Lou Retton: America's Sweetheart, 2014

== Awards ==
- 2010 Moonbeam Children's Book Awards for Cutters Don't Cry
- 2012 Moonbeam Children's Book Awards for Gabby Douglas: Golden Smile, Golden Triumph
- 2014 Children's Literary Classics Award - Gold Medal for Kaylee: The "What If?" Game
