= Jevgenija Lisicina =

Latvian musician

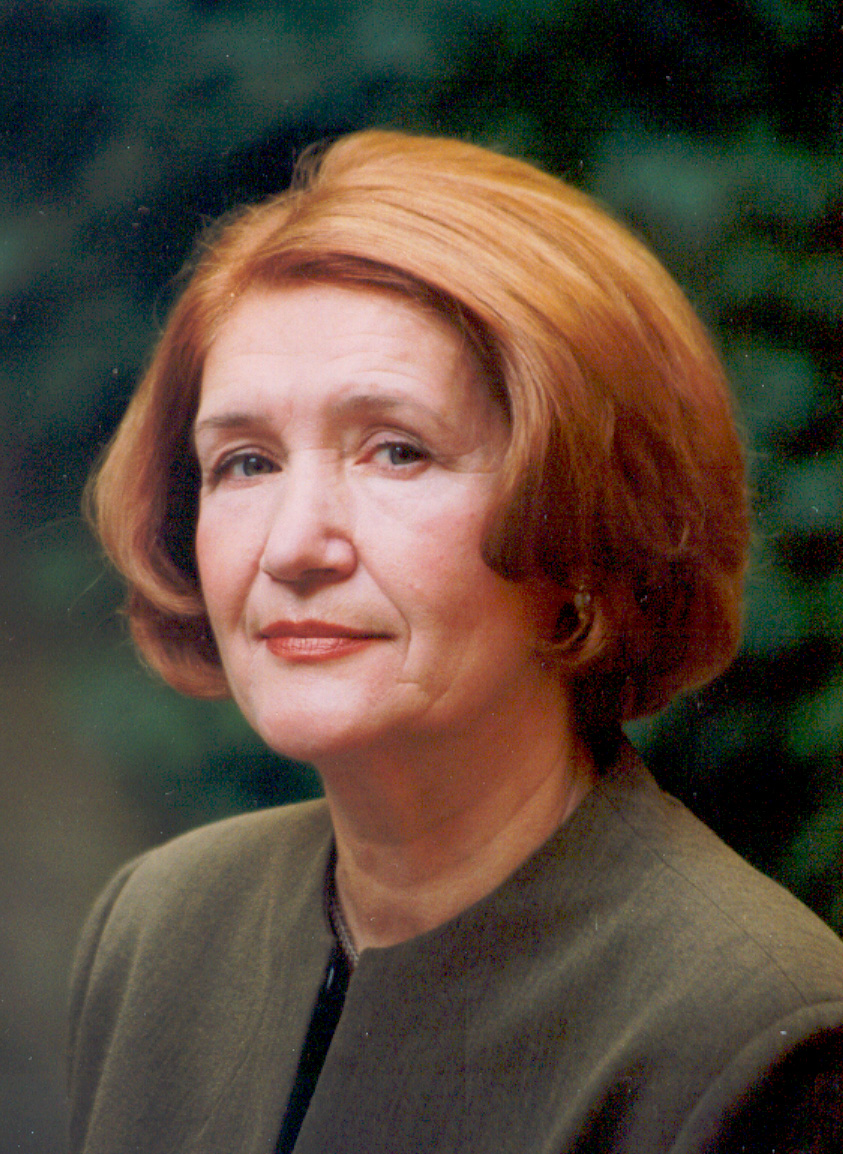
- Lisicina in 2001
- Born: November 11, 1942; Stupino, Russia
- Occupation: Organist

Jevgenija Lisicina (Latvian: Jevgēnija Ļisicina), also spelled Yevgeniya Lisicyna, Eugenia Lissitsyna or Jewgenia Lisitzina (Russian: Евгения Лисицына), is a Russian and Latvian organist.

== Awards ==
On April 27, 1995 Parliament of Latvia awarded Jevgenija Lisicina with Latvian citizenship for special merits and contribution to the culture of Latvia.
