= Rūdolfs Saule =

- Born: 27 January 1903; Vidzeme, Russian Empire
- Died: 16 March 1975; Chicago, Illinois
- Education: Latvian National Ballet
- Occupation(s): ballet master, performer, artist, actor, carpenter

Rūdolfs Saule (27 January 1903, Vidzeme – 16 March 1975, Chicago) was a Latvian performer, professional actor, ballet master and artist. He performed widely for the Latvian National Ballet, as a part of their core team during the late 1920s and 1930s, under Osvalds Lemanis. Saule was renowned for his role in the commedia dell'arte performance of Scaramouche.

== Biography ==
He was born and raised near Cēsis in the former Government of Livland. His father, Jānis Saule, died in a car crash, and his mother, Kristīne died in his youth, and Saule moved to Riga soon thereafter. During the Latvian War of Independence Saule served in the Latvian Army, and moved to Riga, following the end of World War I.

Rūdolfs Saule performed for the Latvian National Ballet. Herein, he studied under great Russians artists and performers whom had inspired Osvalds Lemanis. The idea of establishing a permanent ballet troupe came in 1922 when St. Petersburg Marinsky Theater ballet teacher and director Nikolai Sergeyev began instructing dancers, who gathered in Riga. Saule was perhaps, most renown for his role in the Italian comedy, Scaramouche, performing in 1923. Saulē is also known for his roles in the Latvian interpretations of Don Quixote, Cavalier of Roses, the cardinal in Esmeralda, Señor of Bolero and "Cavalier Henry" in The Last Dream, among a handful of others.

During the World War II, Saule was sent to Germany, where he was initially marked for heavy labor in a German Bosch military industrial complex devoted to replacement parts for tanks and tracked vehicles, approximately 90 km south of Berlin. Upon realization, among the German High Command, that this particular group were professional performers, the prisoners were assigned the task or role of entertainment, while confined by the Wehrmacht. After combat hostilities ceased, the group made their way through Bavaria to Salzburg. During this time, Saule and his peers performed for Allied Commanders (i.e. HQ British Army of the Rhine, July 1948) across Southern Germany and Austria, as they marched onward to secure emigration status to the United States. The Latvian Ballet, at this point, a "traveling" performance group, performed for the US Third Army in München (Munich) on June 8, 1947 and in Stuttgart, Saule performed the role of "Lieutenant Raymond" on November 19, 1946.

Rūdolfs Saule moved to Oak Park, Illinois in the early 1950s. He spent his latter years in the presence of asbestos, as he applied sheet rock and dry wall in his newly-found occupation as an internal carpenter and transfer warehouse worker. Rūdolfs Saule died in 1975 from leukemia, having spent his days in the presence of asbestos, as he applied sheet rock and dry wall as an internal carpenter. He was survived by his wife Dzidra Sandra Saule (née Erikson) and their three children. Dzidra Saule resides in Central Minnesota.

== See also ==
- Latvian National Ballet
- Latvian People
- List of Latvians
