= Vita Liberte =

Latvian businessperson

- Born: Rīga, Latvia
- Education: University of Latvia, New York University School of Law
- Occupations: Art collector, Lawyer
- Years active: 1999-present
- Known for: Art collection, philanthropy

Vita Liberte is a Latvian lawyer, art collector, patron, and entrepreneur. She is known as the leading partner of BDO Law and BDO Latvia, board member of the Kim? Contemporary Art Centre and the co-founder of the arts foundation VV Foundation.

== Career ==
Liberte began her professional journey in New York, working for PricewaterhouseCoopers (PWC). She moved back to Latvia in 2001 and continued her career with Deloitte Latvia until 2007. In 2007, Liberte co-founded BDO Zelmenis&Liberte with Deloitte Latvia colleague Jānis Zelmenis, which later became BDO Latvia, part of BDO Global. The company provides various legal and advisory services to a diverse range of industries and clients, including government institutions.

In 2022, The Legal 500 recognized BDO Law as a leader in the field of taxation, also ranking the law firm among the leading experts in the fields of corporate and commercial law, banking and financial law, dispute resolution practice and competition law.

== Art collection and patronage ==
In 2018, Liberte co-founded VV Foundation to support contemporary art and nurture young artists from Latvia and the Baltic region. It promotes accessibility and education of Latvian contemporary art in various ways, both by introducing Latvian artists abroad and by inviting artists and curators from other countries to Latvia. The Foundation pays particular attention to environmentally mindful creativity that seeks to explore and promote ecological solidarity in a post-anthropocene perspective.

In 2021, VV Foundation opened the art gallery and international residency PAiR (Pāvilosta Artist in Residency) in Pāvilosta. The residency provides accommodation, studio space, and an opportunity for Latvian and international artists to foster creative exchange and collaboration by exploring new ideas and approaches in their practice.

Since 2022, Liberte has also been serving as the Honorary Consul of Uruguay in Latvia and has been a member of Tate's Central and Eastern Europe Procurement Committee.

== Awards ==
2019: Ranked 43rd in Forbes Baltic TOP 50 most successful women in business.

2019: Ranked as 1st in the business category in Pastaiga magazine readers' TOP Women Leaders.

2021: "Highly Regarded Women in Tax 2021" by ITR World Tax (nominated).
