= Gints Bude =

Latvian fashion designer

Gints Bude (born 23 April 1971, Riga) is a Latvian fashion designer and an expert of clothing and dress code. He was the first Latvian designer who established his fashion house in 1990. He was also the first one to start tutoring young models in Latvia.

== Biography ==
Gints Bude graduated from college, qualifying as a tailor. After that he studied Fashion garment pattern making and sewing technology in Riga Technical University. In 1988–89, he worked as a tailor in clothing company "Rīgas modes" (Riga fashions) experimental factory as a new collections tailor.

On 2 November 1990, he founded Gints BUDE fashion house and the first professional modeling school in Latvia. He has been a member of Baltic Fashion Designers association since 2004.

Bude is a designer of men's and women's fashion collections presented in international fashion forums, fairs and events since 1994 - men's clothing fair in Europe "Herren-Mode-Wöche-Köln". Co-creator and organizer of Latvian festival "Mode. Māksla. Mūzika." (Fashion. Art. Music.) and "Zelta adata" (Golden needle) award.

His clothing collections have been presented in Riga Fashion Week

In 2005, he participated in a Latvian fashion presentation in Paris, France, within the framework of the Latvian cultural project "Amazing Latvia".

On November 2, 2006, he founded the fashion house "Bude" (current name - Gints BUDE fashion house) and the first professional model school in Latvia "Bude" (current name - Gints BUDE Costume Demonstration Studio).

Gints Bude has participated in Latvian fashion presentations during Latvian culture project Etonnante Lettonie (Surprising Latvia) in year 2005 that took place in Paris, France. Bude is an expert of clothing and dress code for "Vakara ziņas" (Evening News). and "Privātā dzīve" (Private Life)
