= Inara (Casablanca) =

Inara is a neighborhood of Casablanca, Morocco. It was built in the late 1970s and is divided into two sections: Inara 1 and Inara 2. Most of the housing in Inara takes place in usually single floor villas. Green spaces are a high priority for the residents; with most homes having many plants.

Since it was built, Inara has faced significant changes. Once in an isolated area, Inara is now surrounded by several newer neighborhoods, such as Chrifa, Hay My Abdellah, and Oumaria.
