= Juris Markauss =

Latvian chess player

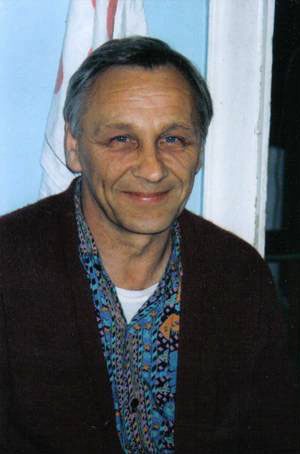
- Markauss in 2012
- Country: Latvia
- Born: June 5, 1943 (age 81); Riga, Latvia
- Title: International Correspondence Chess Master (1989)

Juris Markauss (born June 5, 1943 in Riga) is a Latvian chess player and International Master in correspondence chess.

He started to play chess as a teenager and took to the next level in high school years. In 1969, he graduated from Latvijas Universitāte and became a Candidate Master. He has performed effectively as a correspondence chess player since 1974. At international tournament "ŠAHS-25" in 1989 fulfilled the requirements for International Master. In 1993, he represented Team World in game versus Team Russia.

== Notable achievements ==
- 7th Latvian Team Championship 1976/77 – 1st table, 10½ of 14, 1st place;
- 11th Latvian Championship 1977/80 – 9½ of 13, 1st place;
- 16th USSR Championship semifinal 1981/83 – 11½ of 16, 2nd place;
- 16th USSR Championship final 1983/86 – 9½ of 18, 9th place;
- International tournament "ŠAHS-25" 1984/89 – 14 of 18 (International Master requirements – 12 points), 2nd place. Special award for the most beautiful combination;
- 9th USSR Team Championship 1988/92 - 2nd place for the team, 5th table, 14½ of 16, 1st place;
- VIII/IX World Cup round robin 1990/93 - 9 of 10, 1st place;
- 12th Chess Olympics round robin 1992/97 – 1st place for the team, 1st table, 8 of 11, 1st place;
- VIII/IX World Cup semifinal 1994/97 - 9 of 10, 1st place.
