= Juris Māters =

Latvian writer and journalist

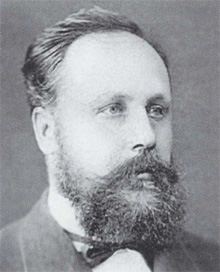
- Born: 11 March 1845; Cilde parish, Russian Empire (now Latvia)
- Died: 4 February 1885 (aged 39); Jelgava, Russian Empire (now Latvia)
- Occupation: writer

Juris Māters (or Māteru Juris; 11 March 1845 – 4 February 1885) was a Latvian writer and journalist.
