= Gints Gabrāns =

Latvian artist

- Born: May 23, 1970 (age 55); Valmiera, Latvia
- Education: Latvian Academy of Art
- Known for: Installations

Gints Gabrāns (born May 23, 1970 in Valmiera) is a well-known contemporary Latvian artist. He mainly works with installations and new media art. He won the Hansabank Art Award in 2005, and in 2007 represented Latvia at the Venice Biennale with the project Paramirrors.

In 1995 graduated from - Latvian Academy of Art, Dept. of Scenography.
