= Ināra Petrusēviča =

Latvian painter

- Born: Ināra Petrusēviča; 17 November 1969; Daugavpils
- Citizenship: Latvia
- Website: https://www.inara.cc/

Ināra Petrusēviča (also known under Russian-language spelling Inara Petrusevich, Russian: Инара Петрусевич; born November 17, 1969, Daugavpils) is a Latvian artist.

== Biography ==
Ināra Petrusēviča was born to the family of construction workers, with her mother being Hero of Socialist Labor, with 3 medals. She remembers her grand-grandparent was a large landowner, who split his land among his many children and her grandmother's name was Maria Oshmyansky.

Ināra enjoyed drawing since early childhood and she was encouraged to join the newly established Daugavpils Children's Art School, which she graduated together with the regular secondary school in 1986. She continued learning the basics of painting at the preparation courses of the Latvian Academy of Arts in Riga during 1987–1990, with the help of her friend painters Grigory Mikheyev and Ludmila Protsenko. The competition for the entrance to the academy was high, and she managed to enter there only on the 3rd attempt, however the tuition fee was high and so she returned home, married, and gave birth to son Nikita.

In early 1990s she worked in the association of young artists "Krasts", where she had her first professional exhibition. (Her first student exhibition was at the Daugavpils Musical College in 1986, her first exhibition abroad was in Sweden at Gotland in 1992.) With the help of artist Leonid Baulin (Леонид Баулин) she got a large art studio. In the newly independent Latvia, in mid-90s, art galleries started to open, and her works began to sell. Since 1998 she had her works in the Lejre Art Gallery (Galleri Gl. Lejre), Lejre, Denmark. During 2000-2003 she worked in Denmark and improved her knowledge and skills in a college of arts and design in London.

Since 2009 she lives in the residential area of Daugavpils fortress.

In the last years she became interested in Buddhism and has been taking part in the establishment of the Buddhist center in Daugavpils.

== Works ==
Her works are influenced by Belarusian and Russian painting, especially by Marc Chagall, rather than the Latvian school. Her paintings and graphics works are variously described as playful, childish, feminine, with optimistic colors, vitality and humour, "the impressionism of the soul". She uses various materials: gouache, mascara, watercolor, acrylic and oil paints.

As of 2018 she had 4 personal exhibitions at Lejre Art Gallery. Her 4th exhibition there (2018) Letter form Afar was on the occasion of the 100th anniversary of the independence of Lithuania, and among its themes were joint history and cooperation of Latvia and Denmark. As of 2014 she had over 10 solo exhibitions in Latvia and elsewhere, including Riga, Daugavpils, Denmark, Vitebsk and Vilnius.

Her paintings are on a permanent exhibition at Vitebsk Museum of Modern Art, Belarus and Mark Rothko Art Centre, Daugavpils.
