= Ho-Chunk Nation of Wisconsin =

Federally recognized tribe in the US

Ho-Chunk Nation
Hoocąk

Total population
- 7,863 in 2020

Regions with significant populations
- United States (Wisconsin)

Languages
- English, Ho-Chunk

Religion
- Waaksik Wosga, Native American Church

Related ethnic groups
- other Ho-Chunk, Otoe, Iowa people, and Missouria

The Ho-Chunk Nation (Ho-Chunk language: Hoocąk) is a federally recognized tribe of the Ho-Chunk with traditional territory across five states in the United States: Wisconsin, Illinois, Iowa, Minnesota, and Missouri. The other federally recognized tribe of Ho-Chunk people is the Winnebago Tribe of Nebraska. The tribe separated when its members were forcibly relocated first to an eastern part of Iowa known as the Neutral Ground, then to Minnesota, South Dakota and later to the current reservation in Nebraska.

Historically, the surrounding Algonquin tribes referred to them by a term that evolved to Winnebago, which was later used as well as by the French and English. The Ho-Chunk Nation have always called themselves Ho-Chunk. The name Ho-Chunk comes from the word Hocaagra (Ho meaning "voice", cąk meaning "sacred", ra being a definitive article) meaning "People of the Sacred Voice".

== Government ==
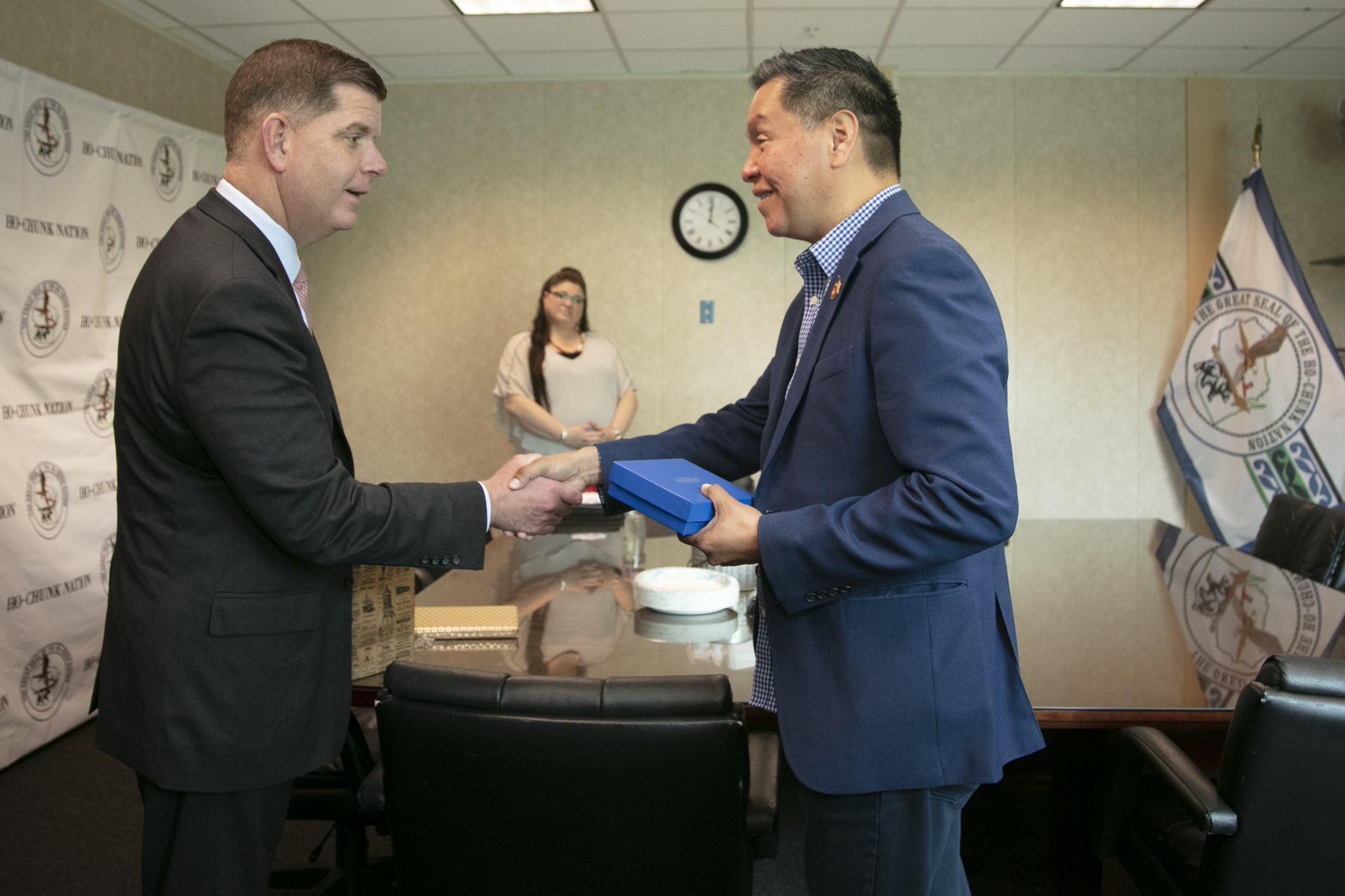
Then Ho-Chunk nation president Marlon WhiteEagle (right) and US Secretary of Labor Marty Walsh (left) meet in 2021

Ho-Chunk Nation Three Rivers House in La Crosse, Wisconsin

The Ho-Chunk Nation is headquartered in Black River Falls, Wisconsin. With the adoption of its most recent constitution in 1994, which restored the tribe's name for itself, the Ho-Chunk Nation, the modern tribal government structured itself after the federal and state governments, with executive, legislative and judicial branches. Executive and legislative members are elected. All of the tribe's members make up the fourth branch of government, the general council.

The nation's current president is Jon Greendeer, alongside vice president Lambert Cleveland, Jr. The Chief Justice of the Supreme Court is Todd R. Matha, alongside two Associate Justices: Tricia Zunker and David J.W. Klauser. The legislature currently consists of:

- Paul Fox (Dist. 1)
- Phyllis Smoke (Dist. 1)
- Tracy Thundercloud (Dist. 1)
- Stephanie Begay (Dist. 2)
- Damian Thundercloud (Dist. 2)
- Kyle WhiteEagle (Dist. 2)
- Lambert Cleveland, Jr. (Dist. 3)
- Sarah Lemieux-WhiteEagle (Dist. 3)
- Shelby Visintin (Dist. 3)
- Sandra Whitewing (Dist. 4)
- Ed Mullen (Dist. 4)
- David Greendeer (Dist. 4)

== Land base ==
Ho-Chunk Nation of Wisconsin lands as of 2020: Land with reservation status Off-reservation trust land

The Ho-Chunk Nation is considered a "non-reservation" tribe, as members historically had to acquire individual homesteads in order to regain title to ancestral territory. Many tribal members privately own their own land. The tribe oversees and maintains parcels of land placed in Trust as Indian Trust Land as designated by the federal government, Secretary of the Interior and Bureau of Indian Affairs (BIA), spread over Adams, Clark, Crawford, Dane, Eau Claire, Jackson, Juneau, La Crosse, Marathon, Monroe, Rock, Sauk, Shawano, Vernon, and Wood counties, Wisconsin. The federal government has granted legal reservation status to some of these parcels, but the Ho-Chunk nation does not have a contiguous reservation in the traditional sense. The nation is actively seeking to reacquire more traditional land and place it into trust status.

According to the U.S. Census Bureau, the Ho-Chunk Nation reservation parcels totaled 3.46 square miles (8.96 km^{2}) in 2020, with an additional 12.57 square miles (32.56 km^{2}) of off-reservation trust land. The combined reservation and off-reservation trust land have a total area of 16.03 square miles (41.51 km^{2}), of which 15.93 square miles (41.27 km^{2}) is land and 0.09 square miles (0.24 km^{2}) is water.

=== Trust land demographics ===
The United States Census Bureau reports demographics for Ho-Chunk Nation trust lands, but the bureau implemented new privacy protections in 2020 including random variations that may make the reported census figures inaccurate for tribal trust land areas. According to the census of 2020, the total population living on Ho-Chunk Nation Reservation and Off-Reservation Trust Land was 1,577. The population density was 99.0 inhabitants per square mile (38.2/km^{2}). There were 551 housing units at an average density of 34.6 per square mile (13.4/km^{2}). The racial composition was 81.2% Native American, 6.9% White, 0.8% Black or African American, 0.2% Asian, 0.1% Pacific Islander, 0.6% from other races, and 10.1% from two or more races. Ethnically, the population was 6.0% Hispanic or Latino of any race.

According to the American Community Survey estimates for 2016–2020, the median income for a household located on Ho-Chunk reservation or off-reservation trust land was $42,917, and the median income for a family was $43,750. Male full-time workers had a median income of $41,625 versus $36,458 for female workers. The per capita income was $18,897. About 19.3% of families and 26.1% of the population were below the poverty line, including 40.8% of those under age 18 and 10.9% of those age 65 or over. Of the population age 25 and over, 84.6% were high school graduates or higher and 9.7% had a bachelor's degree or higher.

== Culture ==
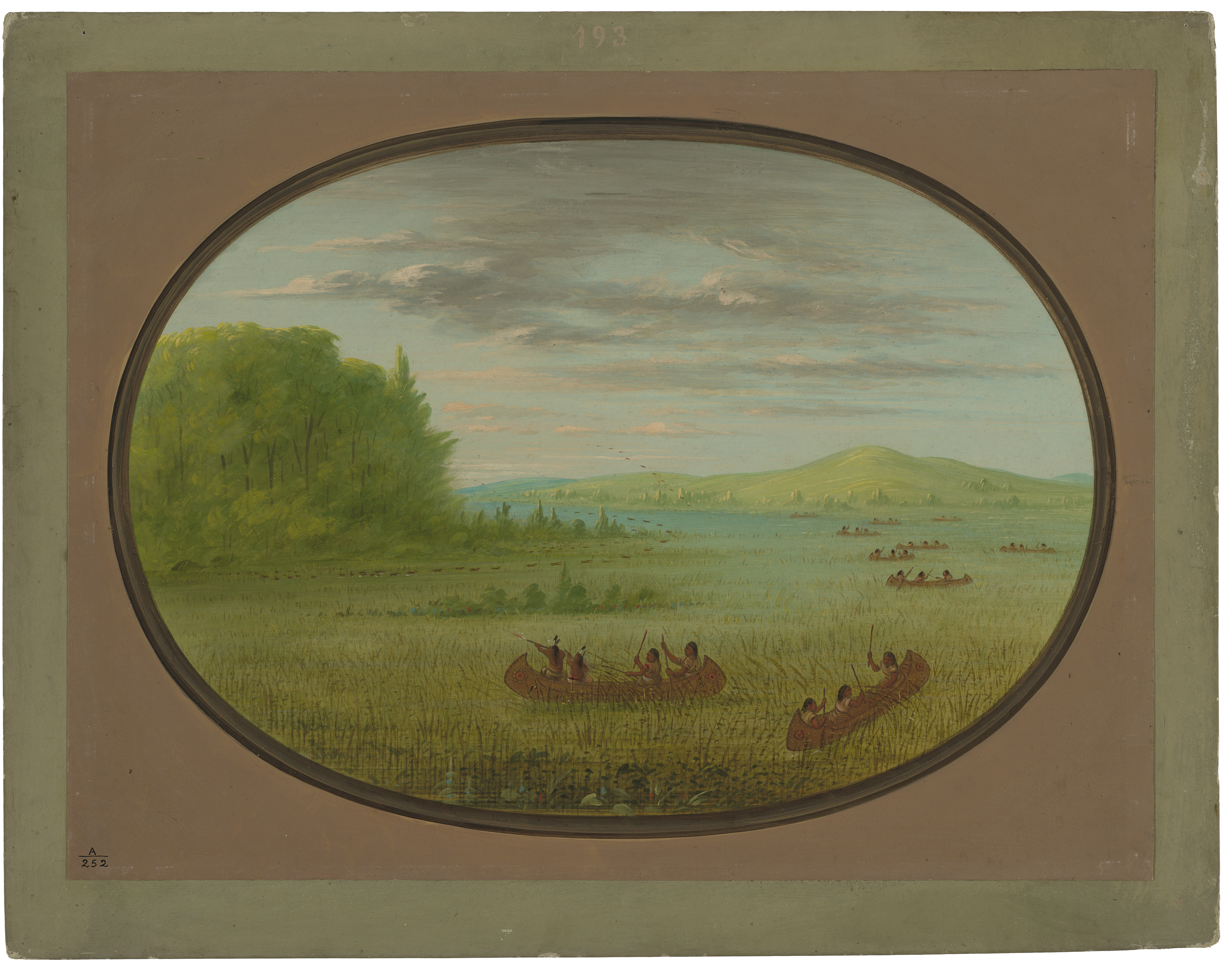
George Catlin, Gathering Wild Rice - Winnebago, 1861-1869

The Ho-Chunk cultivated a variety of agricultural products for subsistence, including corn, squash, beans, and other products. They stored these in fiber bags and pits dug in the ground for winter use. They traveled up the Fox and Wisconsin rivers to hunt both small and large game, crossed the Mississippi to reach the prairies to hunt buffalo, and also fished in nearby rivers and lakes. Dugout canoes found near many small lakes and rivers in the Madison area are prompting new anthropological research projects.

The Ho-Chunk held many ceremonies. The major summer ceremonial was the Medicine Dance, which included a secret ceremony for members of the Medicine Dance Society, a religious society open to both men and women, as well as public rituals. The winter feast was a clan ceremony intended to increase war and hunting powers; the spring Buffalo Dance was a magical ceremonial for calling the bison herds.

Ho-Chunk women were responsible for growing, gathering and processing food for their families, including agricultural products and a wide variety of roots, nuts and berries, as well as sap from maple trees. In addition, women learned to recognize and use a wide range of roots and leaves for medicinal and herbal purposes. Women also cooked game and prepared food and meals for the hunters to sustain them while traveling. They also tanned the hides to make clothing and storage bags.

Ho-Chunk men were hunters and, when the need arose, warriors. As hunters, they would catch fish by spearing them and clubbing the fish to death. The men would also hunt game such as muskrat, mink, otter, beaver, and deer. Leaders among the men acted in political relations with other tribes. Some men created jewelry out of silver and copper that both men and women would wear. To become men, boys would go through a rite of passage at puberty, fasting for a period, in hopes of acquiring a guardian spirit.

=== Language ===
The Ho-Chunk Nation speaks the Ho-Chunk language (Hocąk), which is a Chiwere-Winnebago language, part of the Siouan-Catawban language family. With Hocąk speakers increasingly limited to a declining number of elders, the tribe has created a Language Division within the Heritage Preservation Department aimed at documenting and teaching the language. The division has developed a community outreach program for language revitalization, a Language Apprenticeship Program, and "EeCoonį". This program is operated at Christmas Mountain in Wisconsin Dells; it immerses young children in the language with the help of language instructors, eminent speakers, and language apprentices, among other efforts.

== History ==
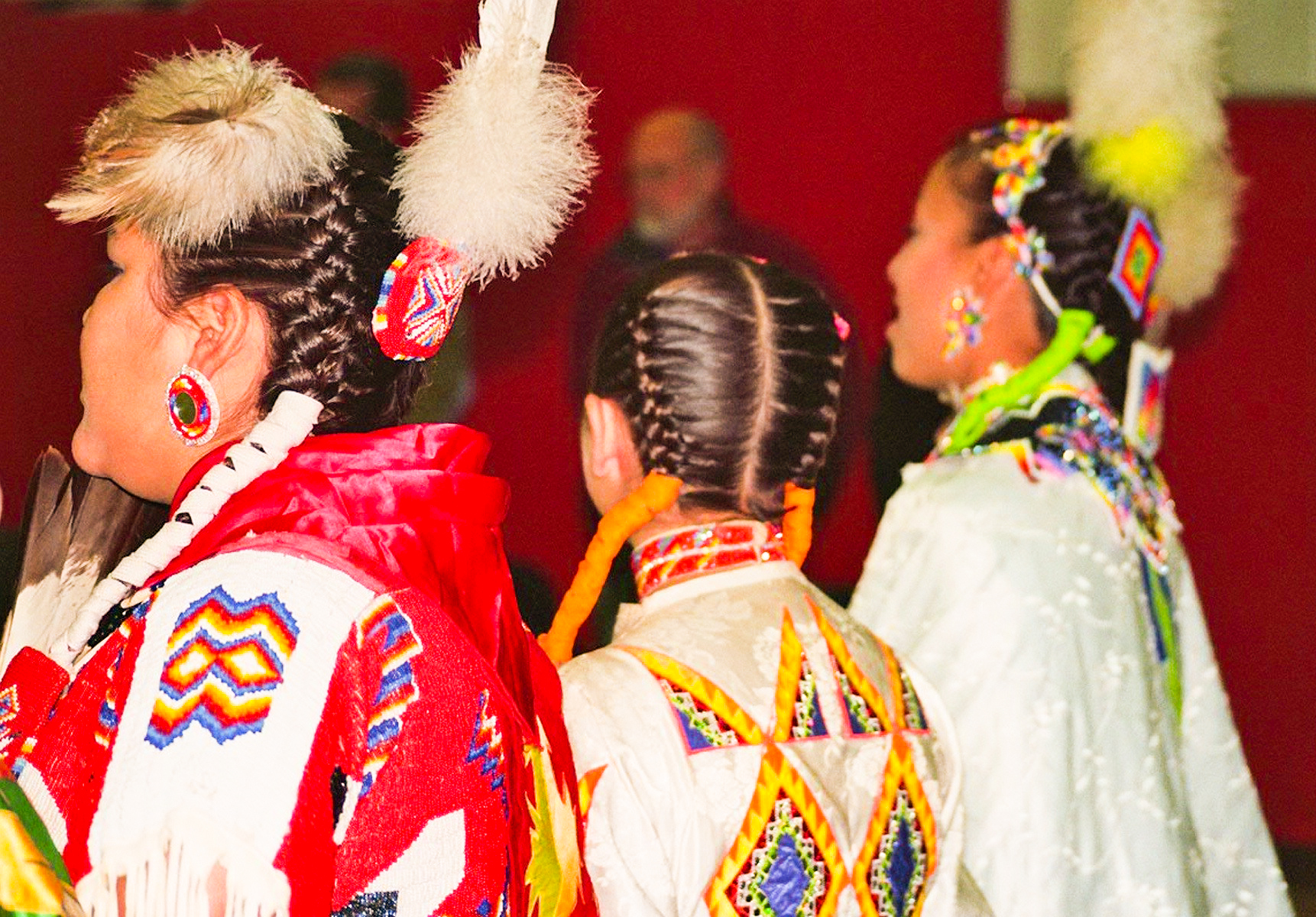
Women at a Ho-Chunk powwow in Wisconsin - 2006

Oral history suggests some of the tribe may have been forcibly relocated up to 13 times by the US federal government to steal land through forced treaty cession, losses estimated at 30 million acres in Wisconsin alone. Following the Dakota War of 1862, the tribe was forcibly removed from their Blue Earth Reservation in Minnesota. Those that complied with these U.S. Army orders were moved to Crow Creek in South Dakota while other tribe members returned to Wisconsin. Only a few Ho-Chunk and their families were allowed to remain in Minnesota by joining Minnesota regiments in the U.S. Civil War. By the 1870s, a majority of the tribe returned to their homelands in Wisconsin. Under the Homestead Act, some tribal members gained title to 40-acre (16 ha) parcels of land.

The nation's flag was adopted in 1992. Its five colors (red, white, green, blue, and black) all represent animals of particular clans and have corresponding meanings in the tribe's oral history. The flag features the nation's seal and is surrounded by ornate designs in a field of white, all surrounded by a blue border.

Today, the Ho-Chunk Nation owns and operates several casinos, Ho-Chunk Gaming, in Black River Falls, Baraboo, Madison, Nekoosa, Tomah, Wisconsin Dells, and Wittenberg, Wisconsin. They also own numerous restaurants and hotels connected to the casinos, as well as numerous gas stations. The Ho-Chunk Nation is the largest employer in Jackson and Sauk counties, employing roughly 3,100 people.

In 2015 the Ho-Chunk Nation passed a resolution amending their constitution to include the rights of nature. By 2020 a working group was determining how to integrate the resolution into their constitution, laws, regulations, and processes.

== Notable tribal members ==
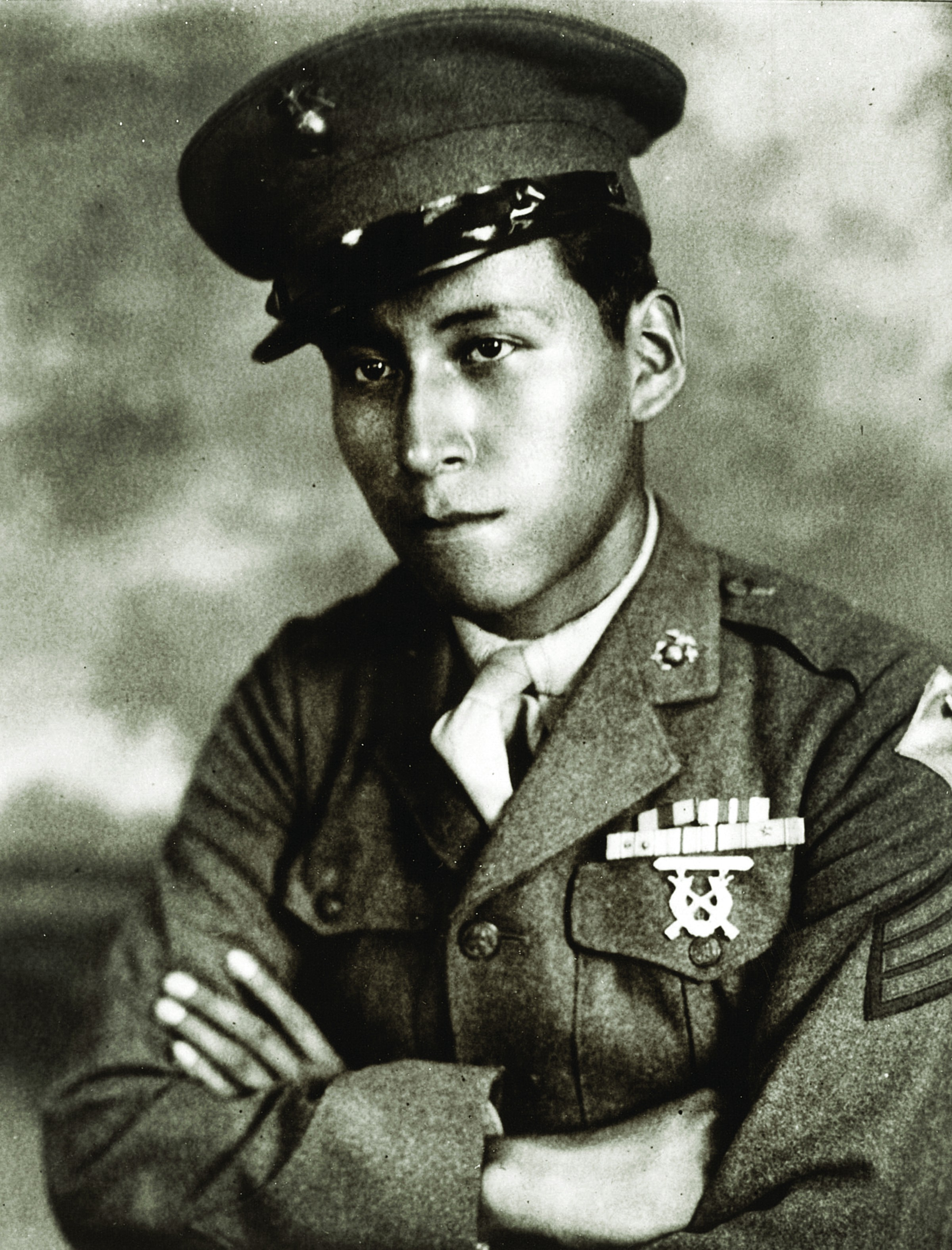
Mitchell Red Cloud Jr., tribal member and decorated Marine who was killed in combat in Korea

- Glory of the Morning (died c. 1832), tribal leader
- Truman Lowe (1944–2019), artist, curator, professor
- Mitchell Red Cloud Jr. (1924–1950), U.S. Marine, decorated veteran of the Korean War
- Bronson Koenig (b. 1994), point guard, played for the University of Wisconsin Badgers basketball team from 2013–2017
- Sharice Davids (b. 1980), member of House of Representatives from Kansas' 3rd Congressional District
- Sky Hopinka (b. 1984), visual artist and film-maker
- Tom Jones (b. 1964), artist, curator, University of Wisconsin professor of photography
- Lila Greengrass Blackdeer (1932–2021), black ash basket maker

== See also ==
- Ho-Chunk
- Ho-Chunk language
- Ho-Chunk mythology
- Ho-Chunk religion
