= Juris Rubenis =

Latvian Lutheran pastor (born 1961)

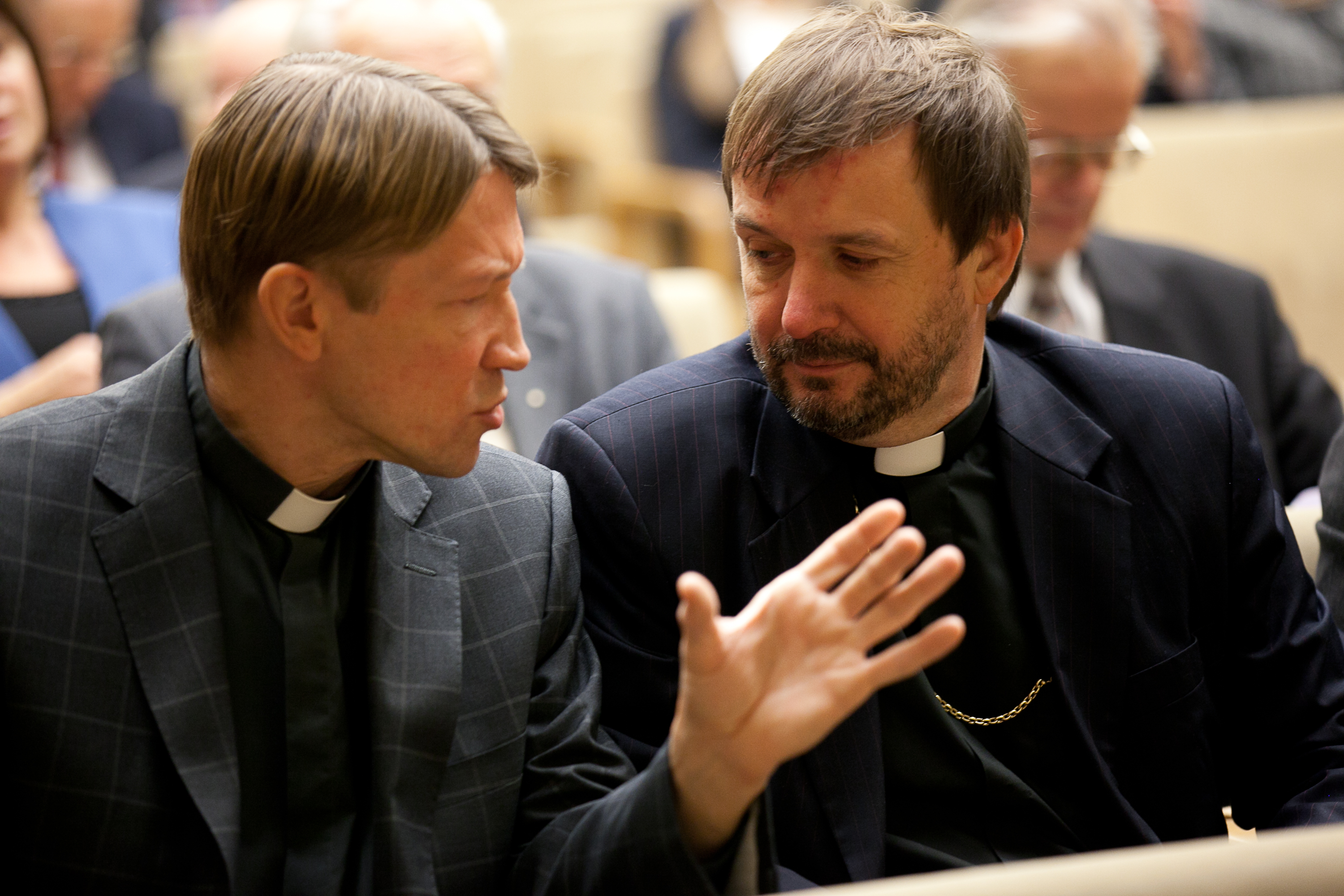
- Juris Rubenis (left) discussing with Archbishop Jānis Vanags
- Church: Evangelical Lutheran Church of Latvia

Orders
- Ordination: 1982

Personal details
- Born: 20 December 1961 (age 64) Riga, Latvian SSR
- Occupation: pastor, clergy, writer

Juris Rubenis (20 December 1961) is a Latvian Lutheran pastor.

Rubenis has written more than 20 original literature and theology books. Many of his books have been translated into Lithuanian, German and English. He has published more than 500 articles in German, English, Russian and other languages.

Ordinated in 1982 Rubenis was one of the founders of the "Rebirth and Renewal" movement of Latvian Lutheranism in 1987. He participated in the renewal of the Faculty of Theology of University of Latvia in 1990. He was also a member of the Popular Front of Latvia. In 1994, Rubenis was awarded the Order of the Three Stars (the rank Officer, 4th class). In 2008, Rubenis was awarded the Cross of Recognition. Rubenis is an honorary member of the Latvian Academy of Sciences (2002). Until 1989 he served in the Liepāja Lutheran parish but from 1989 until 2012 he was a pastor in Church of Luther in Riga.

In 2009 Juris Rubenis founded a meditation centre "Elijas nams" in Ventspils Municipality. In 2011 Rubenis graduated from Lassalle Kontemplationsschule Via integralis in Zürich. In 2012 he left his service as a pastor in Riga and moved to Ventspils Municipality to lead his meditation centre. In 2009 Elijas Nams was named a member of The World Coummunity for Christian Meditation.
