= Latvian national awakening =

Three national revival movements in Latvia

The Latvian National Awakening (Latvian: latviešu [or latvju] tautas atmoda) refers to three distinct but ideologically related national revival movements:

- the First Awakening refers to the national revival led by the Young Latvians from the 1850s to the 1880s
- the Second Awakening or "New Current" was the movement that led to the proclamation of Latvian independence in 1918
- the Third Awakening was the movement that led to the restoration of Latvia's independence in the "Singing Revolution" of 1987–1991

== Application of the term ==
Although the term "Awakening" was introduced by the Young Latvians, its application was influenced by the nationalist ideologue Ernests Blanks and later by the academician Jānis Stradiņš. Stradiņš was the first person to use the term "Third Awakening" (at the expanded plenum of the Writers' Union of the Latvian SSR in June 1988), opposing those who had begun to call the national revival in the period of glasnost the Second Awakening (the first being that of the Young Latvians).

Blanks sought to distinguish between the New Current (in Latvian: Jaunā strāva) — a broad and radical socio-economic, political, and cultural movement that lasted from the late 1880s until the 1905 Revolution, led by Rainis and influenced by Marxism — from the more nationalistic direction taken in 1903 by Ernests Rolavs and Miķelis Valters; to Blanks, the 1890s "could be stricken completely from the history of national thought." He saw Rolavs' and Valters' nationalist Latvian Social Democratic Union (in Latvian: Sociāldemokratu savienība; sometimes abbreviated SDS) — a radical socialist group critical of the cosmopolitanism of the Latvian Social Democratic Workers' Party (Latvijas sociāldemokrātiskā strādnieku partija; LSDSP) — as the direct ideological descendants of the Young Latvians. It was the SDS (and especially Valters) that first began to formulate demands for Latvia's political autonomy

Stradiņš based his view of the national revival in the 1980s on Blanks, considering the Second Awakening similarly: He viewed the organization of the Latvian riflemen, the activities of the Latvian émigrés in Switzerland, the Latvian refugees' relief committee in Russia, the proclamation of independence and the battles for independence as coming under the heading of the Second Awakening. Less frequently, some have seen the New Current and the 1905 Revolution — and sometimes even the Khrushchev Thaw — as National Awakenings.

== See also ==
- History of Latvia

== General sources ==
- Ernests Blanks: Latvju tautas ceļš uz neatkarīgu valsti. Västerås: Ziemeļblāzma, 1970.
- Jānis Stradiņš: Trešā atmoda. Rīga: Zinātne, 1992.
