= Staburags Parish =

Parish of Latvia

- parish of Latvia
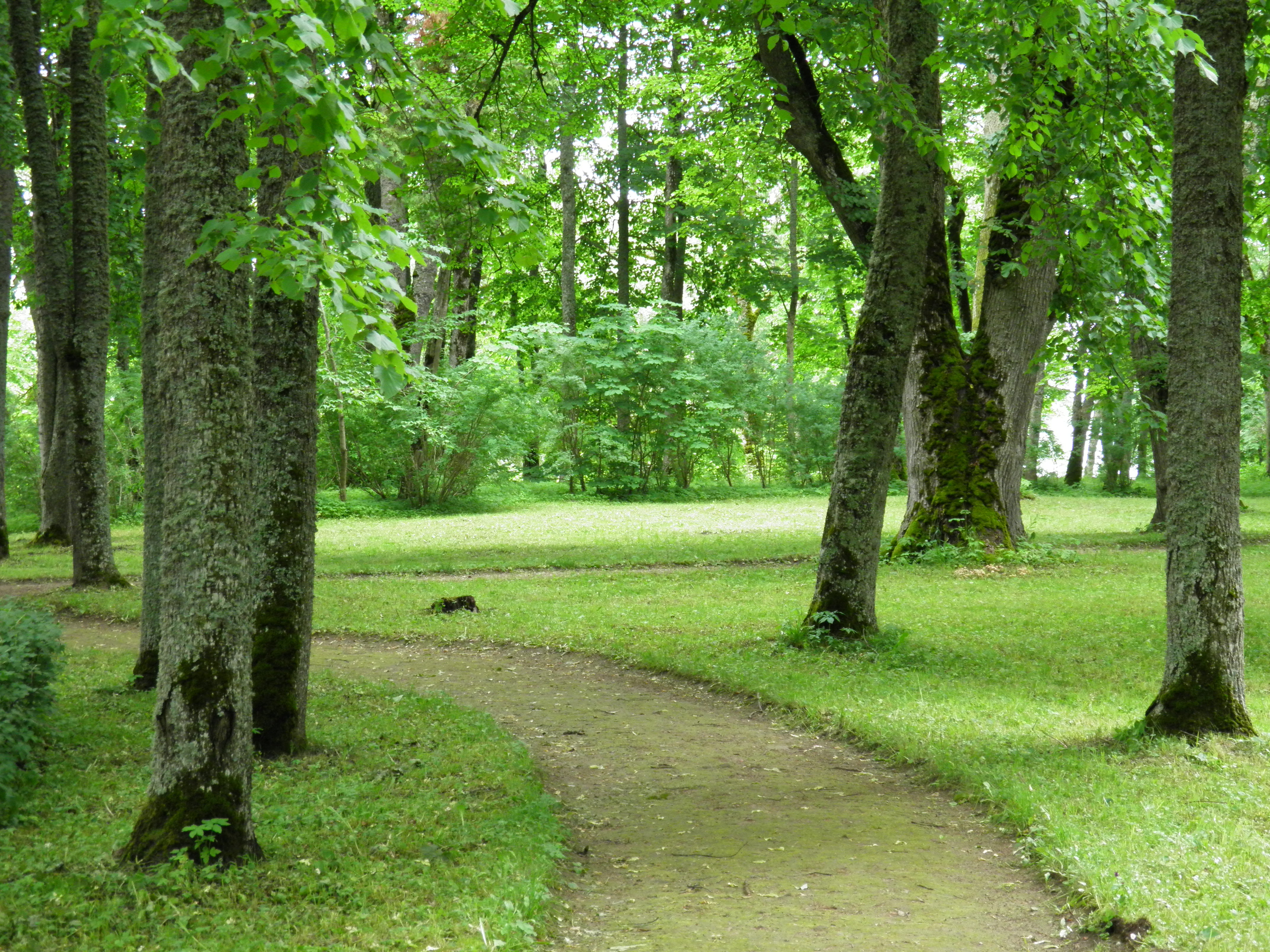

- Coat of arms

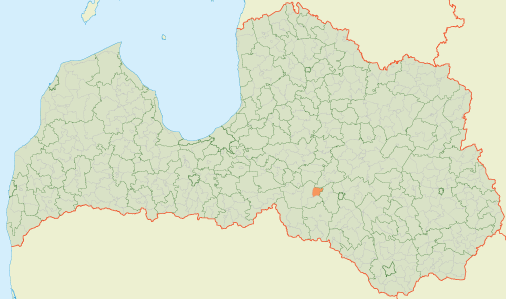
- 56°32′34″N 25°31′00″E
- Country: Latvia

Area
  - Total: 58.54 km^{2} (22.60 sq mi)
  - Land: 56.51 km^{2} (21.82 sq mi)
  - Water: 2.03 km^{2} (0.78 sq mi)

Population (1 January 2024)
  - Total: 327
  - Density: 5.6/km^{2} (14/sq mi)

Staburags Parish (Latvian: Staburaga pagasts) is an administrative unit of Aizkraukle Municipality in the Selonia region of Latvia. Covering 58.5 km^{2} on the forested left bank of the Daugava River where it widens into the Pļaviņas Reservoir, the parish is one of the most sparsely populated areas in Selonia with just 327 residents as of January 2024. The parish takes its name from the now-submerged Staburags cliff, an 18-metre travertine formation that was a Latvian cultural and natural landmark until it was flooded in 1965 during the construction of the Pļaviņas hydroelectric dam. The parish features a memorial ensemble at the former Vīgante Manor estate that commemorates the lost cliff through interpretive displays, walking paths, and cultural elements honouring both the natural formation and its place in Latvian literature and music.

== Description ==
Staburags Parishcovers 58.5 km^{2}, of which 2.0 km^{2} is open water, on the forested left bank of the Daugava where the river widens into the Pļaviņas Reservoir. Shallow drift soils overlie gently undulating Ordovician dolomite; arable strips and orchards concentrate around the administrative village of Staburags, while scattered farmsteads line the Vīgante and Siliņi streams and a parish road links the A6 Riga–Daugavpils highway to lakeside camping areas in Vīgante Park. The Central Statistical Bureau counted 327 residents on 1 January 2024, for a population density of just 5.6 inhabitants per square kilometre, making the parish one of the most thinly settled parts of Selonia.

Created as a rural district in 1945, Staburags Parish was suppressed in the 1949 Soviet local-government reform, re-established in 1990 and incorporated into Jaunjelgava Municipality in 2009; Latvia's nationwide territorial reform of 1 July 2021 transferred it to the enlarged Aizkraukle Municipality, where it remains. The parish takes its name from the travertine cliff Staburags (also called Staburadze), an 18-metre spring-built crag that dominated the Daugava valley until 1965, when it was submerged beneath 6.5 m of water during construction of the Pļaviņas hydroelectric dam. Latvian folk tradition personifies the travertine cliff as Staburadze—a grieving maiden whose tears were turned to stone—while its loss beneath the Pļaviņas reservoir in 1965 helped spark Latvia’s first modern environmental protest and later served as a rallying symbol for the independence-era green movement.

A memorial ensemble on the former Vīgante Manor estate now interprets the vanished landmark. Riverside paths lead to a log amphitheatre used for midsummer concerts and to a lookout marking the cliff's exact position, while panels explain the geological and cultural story. In 2013 woodcarvers added figures of Jancis and Mārčs—the protagonists of Valdis's 1930 children's novel Staburaga bērni—and a lakeside pavilion honours composer Pēteris Barisons, whose choral works premiered here in the 1930s.

== Towns, villages and settlements of Staburags Parish ==
- Robežkrogs
- Staburags
