= Young Latvia =

Young Latvia may refer to:

- Young Latvia movement, Latvia, 19th century
- Jaunlatvija, political party, Latvia, 21st century
- Jaunā Latvija, an extreme right party, Latvia, 1933–1934
