= Staburadze (disambiguation) =

Staburadze may refer to

- Staburadze or Staburags, a former landmark on the bank of Daugava river
- Staburadze, a character in the national epic of Latvia Lāčplēsis
  - Staburadze, a character in Lāčplēsis (rock opera)
- Staburadze, a Latvian confectionery brand of Orkla Group affiliated with Laima
- Staburadze, a Latvian student sorority established in 1947
