= Juris Alunāns =

Latvian writer and philologist (1832-1864)

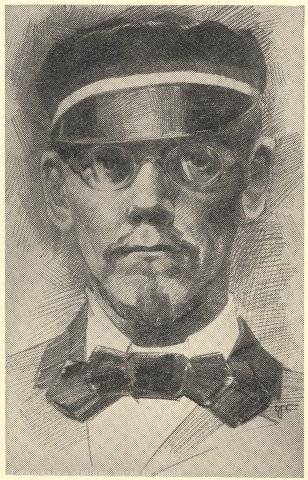
- Born: May 13, 1832; Jaunkalsnava, Governorate of Livonia, Russian Empire (Now Kalsnava Parish, Latvia)
- Died: April 18, 1864 (aged 31); Jostene Parish, Courland Governorate, Russian Empire (Now Sesava Parish, Latvia)
- Education: University of Dorpat
- Occupations: Writer, philologist
- Notable work: "Dziesmiņas, latviešu valodai pārtulkotas" (1856), "Sēta, daba, pasaule"
- Movement: Young Latvians

Juris Alunāns (official name Gustavs Georgs Frīdrihs Alunāns; May 13, 1832 – April 18, 1864) was a Latvian writer and philologist in the Russian Empire. He was one of the first contributors of the Latvian language. He was one of the members of the Young Latvia movement.

Alunāns created about 500 neologisms, most of which were quickly incorporated in the everyday Latvian language and are still being used.
