= Laimdota (given name) =

Female given name

- Gender: Female
- Name day: 11 February

Origin
- Origin: Latvia
- Meaning: Given by Laima
- Region of origin: Latvia

Other names
- Related names: Laimdots

Laimdota is a feminine Latvian given name, borne by over 600 individuals in Latvia. Its name day is February 11.

== People with the name Laimdota ==
- Laimdota Straujuma (born 1951), Prime Minister of Latvia 2014–2015
- Laimdota Zizmare, Research Scientist
- Laimdota Kalniņa, Research Scientist

== In fiction ==
In literature and culture, Laimdota may refer to:

- The maiden Laimdota in the epic poem Lāčplēsis, by Andrejs Pumpurs
- The character Laimdota in the rock opera Lāčplēsis, by Māra Zālīte and Zigmārs Liepiņš
