= Young Latvians =

Intellectuals of the 1850s–1880s first Latvian National Awakening

New Latvians (Latvian: jaunlatvieši) is the term most often applied to the intellectuals of the First Latvian National Awakening (Latvian: Tautas atmoda), active from the 1850s to the 1880s. The movement was modeled on the Young Germany (German: Junges Deutschland) movement led by Heinrich Heine. Originally a derogatory epithet applied to these nationalist intellectuals by their mostly Baltic German opponents, the term "Young Latvia" (German: "ein junges Lettland") was first used by Gustav Wilhelm Sigmund Brasche, the pastor of Nīca, in a review of Juris Alunāns' Dziesmiņas latviešu valodai pārtulkotas ("Little Songs Translated for the Latvian Language") in the newspaper Das Inland in 1856. Asking who could appreciate such literature in Latvian (Alunāns' book was the first major translation of classic foreign poetry into Latvian), Brasche warned that those daring to dream of "a Young Latvia" would meet the tragic fate of the boatman in Heine's poem "Die Lorelei," a translation of which appeared in Alunāns' anthology. The New Latvians were also sometimes known as "Lettophiles" or "tautībnieki" ("ethnicists").

== Beginnings ==
Though the New Latvians can be seen as part of a primarily cultural and literary movement, their cause had significant political ramifications due to the socio-economic conditions then prevailing in Latvia (part of the Russian Empire, it was nonetheless dominated by the Baltic German nobility). 1856 is usually given as the date of the movement's beginning because of the publication of Alunāns' book and the founding of the major Latvian language newspaper Mājas Viesis which provided a counterpoint to the pro-German newspaper Latviešu Avīzes. Another contemporary and seminal event was the public declaration of nationality by a leader of the movement, Krišjānis Valdemārs; a student at the University of Tartu (then Dorpat) from 1854 to 1858, Valdemārs affixed a carte de visite to his door that read "C. Woldemar stud. cam. Latweetis." At the time, it was almost unheard of for an educated person to call himself a Latvian; education meant Germanisation, and Valdemārs' act has been compared to Martin Luther's posting of the 95 Theses to the door of the Castle Church in Wittenberg in its importance for Latvian nationalism. Just as some scholars consider the posting of the 95 Theses to be apocryphal, Valdemārs' notice can be seen as less dramatic if taken in context. The historian Arveds Švābe noted that Valdemārs denied being a radical in his own writings; the New Latvians had no political program threatening the Baltic Germans until the 1860s; according to Švābe, their political opposition to the prevailing order was crystallized under the influence of the Slavophiles in connection to the reforms of Alexander II of Russia.

== Leaders ==
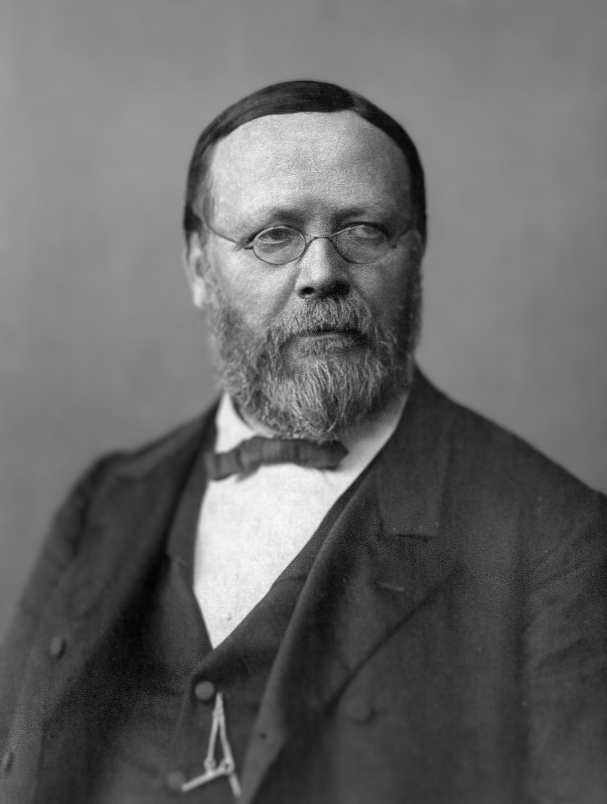
Krišjānis Valdemārs, leader of the movement

Valdemārs is seen as the spiritual father of the Awakening. With Alunāns, he led student gatherings while at Tartu and advocated the study of folklore and the founding of marine academies to turn the Latvians and Estonians into seafaring peoples. Krišjānis Barons began collecting dainas under Valdemārs' direct influence, and in 1862 Valdemārs, Alunāns and Barons collaborated in St. Petersburg to publish Pēterburgas Avīzes. The most radical newspaper hitherto published in Latvian, it was closed by the authorities in 1865. From 1867 to 1873, Atis Kronvalds (often known as Kronvaldu Atis) renewed the "Latvian evenings" begun by Valdemārs at Tartu. His Nationale Bestrebungen (1872) can be seen as the manifesto of the New Latvians. Two of their older colleagues included Kaspars Biezbārdis, the first ethnic Latvian philologist, who helped draft petitions to the tsar on the harsh conditions among the Latvian peasantry (for which he was exiled to Kaluga in 1863), and Andrejs Spāģis, the first writer to draw western European attention to the Baltic problem. Fricis Brīvzemnieks (Treuland) is considered the father of Latvian folkloristics; Barons later made the collection of dainas his life's work. The poet Auseklis (the pen name of Miķelis Krogzemis), in the diplomat and scholar Arnolds Spekke's words, represented "the romantic and mystic search for the nation's soul." The Young Latvian Andrejs Pumpurs later penned the national epic Lāčplēsis, "The Bear Slayer."

== Directions and divisions ==
Defining the movement in retrospect in 1889, Pumpurs wrote: "Those in the grouping that for twenty-five years fought for freedom were called the New Latvians. Their fate was almost always the same. Without a homeland, their people devoid of rights, without goods or sustenance, often without lodging and without bread, they were doomed to wandering. All doors were locked before them, and they were prevented from finding residences or jobs. With a heavy heart they left their beloved homeland and went abroad, into the interior of Russia, searching for sustenance and at the same time gathering knowledge."

In fact, close to half of the ethnic Latvians who received a higher education were forced to seek work in Russia. As Švābe saw it: "With their selfish and shortsighted politics, the [Baltic] German aristocracy and bourgeoisie pressure Latvians into Russophilia." Even Baltic German intellectuals devoted to the study of the Latvian culture and language, like August Johann Gottfried Bielenstein (the editor of Latviešu Avīzes), opposed the New Latvians -- whilst the editor of Die Zeitung für Stadt und Land declared that "to be educated and Latvian is impossible -- an educated Latvian is a nothing" ("sei ein Unding"). Pastor Brasche, writing that there is no Latvian nation and that the Latvian people have no past, suggested replacing "New Latvians" with the term "New Peasants" ("Jung-Bauernstand"). The foremost Lutheran publication declared that Latvians had been a nation in the 13th century but had since been reduced to a peasant class; did every class require its own language? "The Latvian must die." Ethnic Latvian supporters of the Baltic Germans came to be known as "Old Latvians"; partly because many of the New Latvians' opponents were associated with the Lutheran church, the movement also had a pronounced anti-clerical character.

Though one stream of the National Awakening was at first centered in Tartu, moved to St. Petersburg, and later shifted to Moscow, in the late 1860s Lettophiles finally succeeded in establishing themselves in Latvia, by founding a relief fund for victims of the famine in Estonia and Finland in 1867 and receiving permission to establish the Riga Latvian Association a year later. Similar associations followed in other towns, the Rīga original receiving the hypocorisma "mommy" ("māmuļa"). The Rīga Latvian Association staged the first Latvian play, held the first conference of Latvian teachers, and organized the first Latvian song festival in 1873.

Valdemārs engaged in polemics with Keuchel (the author of "sei ein Unding"), penning Nationale Bestrebungen in German as a response to his critics. A pragmatist and materialist, Valdemārs -- in exile and under police supervision in Moscow -- came further under the influence of the Slavophiles, working for the publisher Mikhail Nikiforovich Katkov. To Valdemārs, "the kulak could never be as dangerous as the German's nails of flint."

== Legacy ==
The efforts by Barons and other Young Latvians to collect folklore and dainas became vital for the forming of the Baltic neopagan movement Dievturība, which was created in the 1920s by Ernests Brastiņš and Kārlis Marovskis-Bregžis.

== See also ==
- Young Latvia (disambiguation)
- Latvian literature
- New Current

== Sources ==
- Anderson, Edgar. "Arveds Svabe, 1888-1959". Journal of Central European Affairs (1960), Vol. 20 Issue 1, pp 84-90.
- Arnolds Spekke: History of Latvia: An Outline. Stockholm: M. Goppers/Zelta Ābele, 1951.
- Alfred Bilmanis: A History of Latvia. Princeton: Princeton University Press, 1951.
- Arveds Švābe: Latvijas vēsture 1800-1914. Uppsala: Daugava, 1958.
- Arveds Švābe, ed.: Latvju enciklopēdija. Stockholm: Trīs Zvaigznes, 1952-1953.
- Uldis Ģērmanis: Latviešu tautas piedzīvojumi. Ann Arbor: Ceļinieks, 1974.
- Agnis Balodis: Latvijas un latviešu tautas vēsture. Rīga: Kabata, 1991.
- Teodors Zeiferts: Latviešu rakstniecības vēsture. Rīga: 1922 -- available at https://www.ailab.lv/Teksti/Senie/Zeiferts/zeifsat.htm
- Ernests Blanks: Latvju tautas ceļš uz neatkarīgu valsti. Västerås: Ziemeļbāzma, 1970.
- Ilga Apine: Latvija 19. gadsimta otrajā pusē Retrieved 23. VI. 2005. (archived at )
- Maksim Kirčanov, Zemnieki, latvieši, pilsoņi: identičnost, nacionalizm i modernizacija v Latvii (Voronezh, 2009. 204 s.)ISBN 978-5-98222-461-3 // http://ejournals.pp.net.ua/_ld/1/135_kirchanavs_book.pdf
- Jānis A. Krēsliņš: Recent Publications on Baltic History. Retrieved 23. VI. 2005.
- Arturs Priedītis: Latvijas kultūras vēsture. Daugavpils: A.K.A., 2000. ISBN 9984-582-11-6 (Includes summaries in Russian and English.)
- Viktors Hausmanis, ed.: Latviešu rakstniecība biogrāfijās. Rīga: LZA, 1992.
- Jānis Rozenbergs: "Fricis Brīvzemnieks -- latviešu folkloristikas pamatlicējs." (Includes a brief summary in English.) Retrieved 25. VI. 2005.
- The Latvian Education Informatization System offers extensive information on the Young Latvians and their contributions to linguistics, e.g. "Jaunlatvieši un latviešu valodas attīstība," ("The Young Latvians and the Development of the Latvian Language"). Retrieved 25. VI. 2005.
