= Revolutionary Socialist Party of Latvia =

Latvian political party

The Latvian Social Democratic Union (Latvian: Sociāldemokrātu savienība, sometimes abbreviated as SDS) was a socialist political group with roots dating to 1892 in Liepāja. Founded in exile the autumn of 1900 and led by Miķelis Valters and Ernests Rolavs. The group was an outgrowth of the New Current, but soon developed a more radical and nationalistic position in opposition to the much larger Latvian Social Democratic Workers' Party. Many activists from the New Current were arrested in the late 1890s, and many emigrated to Western Europe and the United States. The branches of Valters' and Rolavs' group issued polemics in exile, including Proletārietis ("The Proletarian," a publication printed in Boston in 1902 and 1903 and in Zürich in 1903 and 1904). They were the first to demand full autonomy for Latvia and proposed the transformation of the Russian Empire into a federation of autonomous republics. They also advocated the expropriation of the Baltic German estates in a radical land reform.
