= New Current =

Political movement in 19th and early 20th century Latvia

The New Current (Latvian: Jaunā strāva) in the history of Latvia was a broad leftist social and political movement that followed the First Latvian National Awakening (led by the Young Latvians from the 1850s to the 1880s) and culminated in the 1905 Revolution. Participants in the movement were called jaunstrāvnieki. The best-known representatives of the new current were Pauls Dauge, Jānis Jansons-Brauns, Jānis Pliekšāns, Fricis Roziņš, Pēteris Stučka, Miķelis Valters and Elza Rozenberga.

== History ==
The beginning of the New Current is usually given as 1886, when the movement's newspaper, Dienas Lapa ("The Page of the Day"), was founded by Pēteris Bisenieks, who ran the Riga Latvian Craftsmen's Credit Union. Pēteris Stučka, who later headed the Latvian Bolsheviks, became the editor of Dienas Lapa in 1888. From 1891 to 1896, the paper was edited by Bisenieks and Rainis (the pen name of Jānis Pliekšāns). Rainis, who became Latvia's foremost dramatist and the literary figure "inseparably linked to the birth of the independent Latvian nation and the struggle for freedom" [Aivars Stranga], was also the leading figure in the New Current. Under Rainis and Stučka—the latter was again editor in 1896-97 -- Dienas Lapa turned to socialism; shut down by the Ministry of the Interior in 1897, the paper took a moderate turn under the editorship of the philosopher and publicist Pēteris Zālīte (formerly an editor of Mājas Viesis—see the Young Latvians article) between 1899 and 1903; despite its moderation under Zālīte, the paper was again shut down by the censors, re-emerging in 1905 as the Social Democratic newspaper before its permanent closure.

== Evaluation ==
The historian Arveds Švābe describes the New Current as "connected to the political awakening of the Latvian working class, its first organizations, and the propagandization of socialist ideas.". Most historians point to what the painter Apsīšu Jēkabs called "the beginning of a cleft between the Latvian farmer and his farm hand" in the 1870s, and by 1897 there were 591 656 landless peasants in what is now Latvia (compared to 418 028 smallholders and their dependents).

Their partial urbanization led to a growing proletariat, fertile ground for the ideas of western European socialism, and this coincided with a loss of momentum for the Young Latvians, whose ideas had been enfeebled by national romanticism as a gulf grew between the bourgeoisie and the poor, the leading nationalists of the era having been arrested and exiled. Rainis smuggled German Marxist literature into Latvia in two pieces of luggage in 1893: the work of Karl Marx, Friedrich Engels, and Karl Kautsky. This "luggage with the dangerous contents," as the historian Uldis Ģērmanis called it, was the seed of the Latvian Social Democratic Party.
