= Lāčplēsis =

Latvian national epic

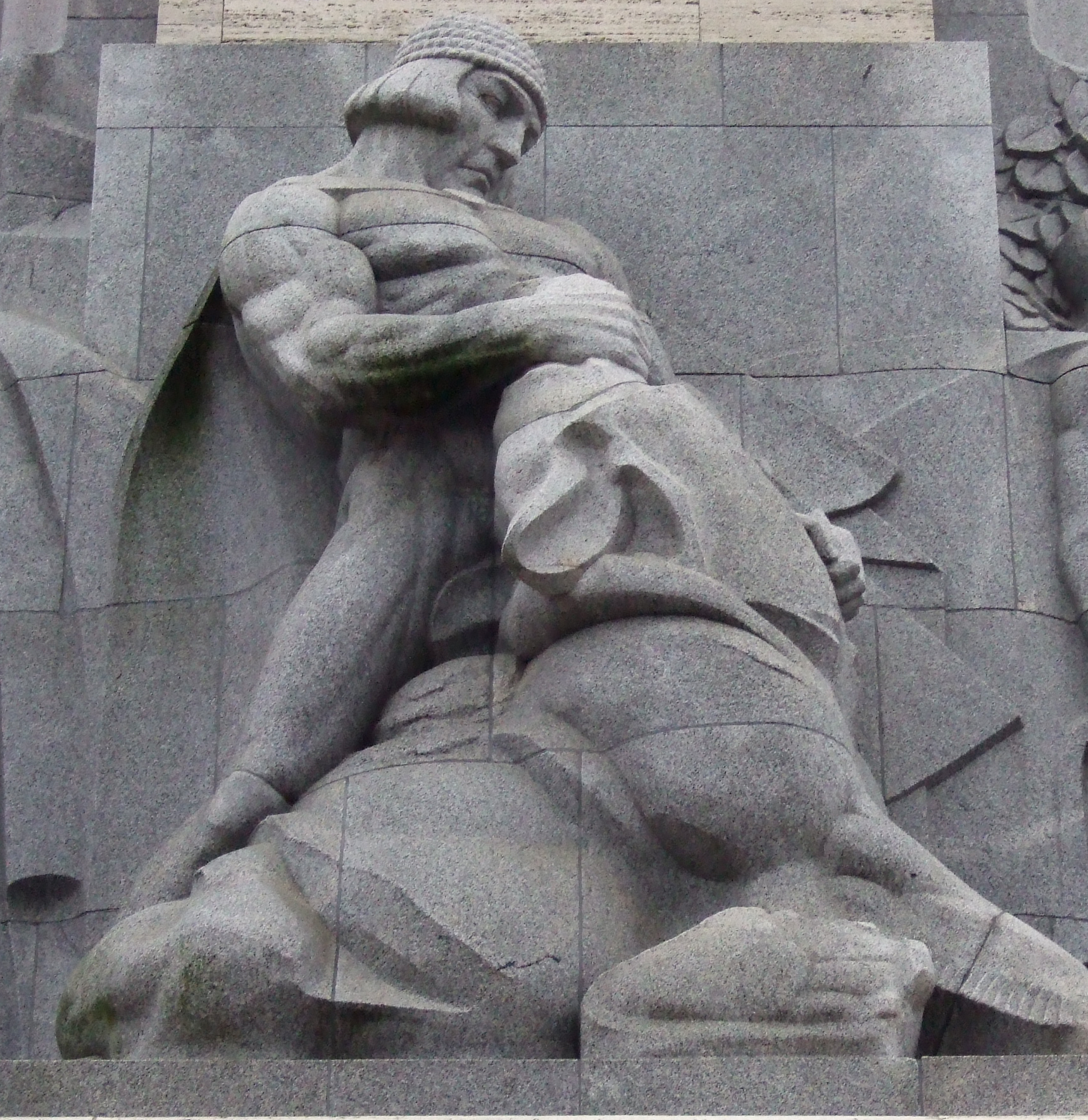
- Lāčplēsis on the Freedom Monument
- Author: Andrejs Pumpurs
- Language: Latvian, translated multiple times.
- Genre: Epic poetry, National epic
- Publication date: 1888
- Publication place: Latvia

Lāčplēsis ("The Bear-Slayer") is an epic poem by Andrejs Pumpurs, a Latvian poet, who wrote it between 1872 and 1887 based on local legends. It is set during the Livonian Crusades telling the story of the mythical hero Lāčplēsis "the Bear Slayer". Lāčplēsis is regarded as the Latvian national epic.

== Synopsis ==
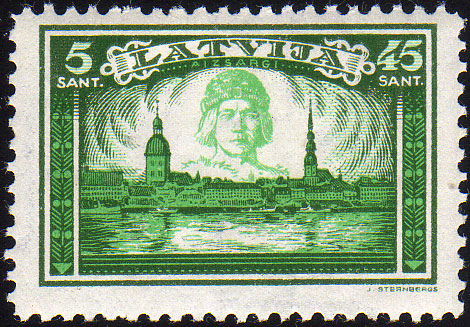
Latvian postage stamp depicting Lāčplēsis as the protector of Riga

The poem opens at the council of the Baltic gods at the palace of Pērkons in the sky where the Father of Destiny declares that Latvians are under threat because Christian crusaders are going to come and conquer the Baltic lands and enslave the Latvian nation. The Gods promise to protect the Latvians. When the meeting comes to an end suddenly Staburadze arrives and ask for advice in her matter: she has found a young man drowning in the river Daugava where he has to turn into stone. Pērkons says that he has chosen this man for an important matter and that he will save the man. The council ends with the question, will the Baltic gods ever come back together?

There follows a flashback of a few days to an occasion upon which the Lord of Lielvārde is taking a walk with his 18-year-old son. Suddenly a bear jumps out to attack them. Undaunted, the son seizes the bear by the jaws and rips it apart as if it had been no more of a threat than a small goat, thus earning himself the name Lāčplēsis - the bear slayer. After this he is sent off to the castle of Burtnieks to continue his studies. On the way, at the castle of Lord Aizkrauklis, he spies on the activities of the witch Spīdala, who is under the control of the Devil, and the holy man Kangars, who is in reality a traitor plotting with crusaders to replace the old gods with Christianity. Spīdala tries to drown Lāčplēsis by throwing him into the whirlpool of Staburags in the Daugava, but he is rescued by the goddess Staburadze and taken to her underwater crystal castle. There Lāčplēsis meets and falls in love with the maiden Laimdota. Shortly afterwards, Lāčplēsis becomes friends with another hero, Koknesis ("Wood-bearer"), and they study together at the castle of Burtnieks, Laimdota's father.

Kangars provokes a war with the Estonians, and Lāčplēsis sets out to fight the giant Kalapuisis (Estonian: Kalevipoeg (the "Kalapuisis" name is derived from kalapoiss; it probably refers to the hero of the Estonian epic poem Kalevipoeg)). The two fight to a draw. Afterwards, they make peace and decide to join forces to fight their common enemy, the German crusaders, who are led by the priest Dietrich (Dītrihs). Lāčplēsis performs another heroic deed by spending the night in a cursed sunken castle, breaking the curse and allowing the castle to rise into the air again. Laimdota and Lāčplēsis are engaged. In the following episodes, Laimdota reads from the old books about the Creation and ancient Latvian teachings.

Laimdota and Koknesis are kidnapped and imprisoned in Germany. Spīdala convinces Lāčplēsis that Laimdota and Koknesis are lovers. Lāčplēsis returns home to Lielvārde, then sets sail for Germany. His ship becomes lost in the North Sea, and he is welcomed by the daughter of the North Wind. In the meantime, Dietrich and the Livonian prince Caupo of Turaida meet with the Pope in Rome to plan the Christianization of Latvia. Lāčplēsis begins his dangerous journey home from the Northern Sea. He fights monsters with three, six, and nine heads on the Enchanted Island. Finally, he encounters Spīdala on the island, and frees her from her contract with the Devil. Lāčplēsis is reunited with Laimdota and Koknesis, who escaped from Germany but were then trapped on the Enchanted Island. Koknesis declares his love for Spīdala, and the four friends return to Latvia.

A double wedding is celebrated during the Jāņi (midsummer) festivities, but the heroes soon set off to fight the German crusaders. After several battles, the Germans are pushed back, and their leader, Bishop Albert, brings reinforcements from Germany, including the Dark Knight. At Dietrich's bidding, Kangars finds out the secret of Lāčplēsis' strength and treacherously reveals it to the Germans: Lāčplēsis' mother was a she-bear, and his superhuman strength resides in his bear ears. The German knights come to Lielvārde offering to make peace. Lāčplēsis organizes a friendly tournament at the castle Lielvārde, during which he is goaded into fighting the Dark Knight. The knight cuts off Lāčplēsis' right ear and Lāčplēsis loses the strength in his right hand. Lāčplēsis becomes angry and with his left hand destroys the armor of the Dark Knight, but his sword is also destroyed. The Dark Knight struck back cutting off Lāčplēsis' left ear, leading him to also lose the strength in his left hand. The two wrestle. Lāčplēsis manages to throw the Dark Knight into the Daugava, but falls into the river himself. At this moment Laimdota also dies. At the end of the story a promise is given that the battle between Lāčplēsis and the Dark Knight is not over yet, one day Lāčplēsis will win, then new times will come, and Latvians will be free again.

Canto I
The council of the gods – Lāčplēsis' destiny revealed
Canto II
The first heroic deed of Lāčplēsis – Lāčplēsis sets out to Burtnieki castle – Meeting with Spīdala – In the Devil's pit – In Staburadze's palace – Return and meeting with Koknesis
Canto III
The conspiracy of Kangars and Spīdala – War with the Estonians – The sunken castle – The Creation – The Latvians tricked by the Christians
Canto IV
Kaupa in Rome – Koknesis and Laimdota in Germany – Lāčplēsis in the northern sea – Lāčplēsis' return
Canto V
On the bewitched island – Meeting with Spīdala – Homecoming – Lāčplēsis, Laimdota and Koknesis reunited
Canto VI
Midsummer festival – Battle begins – Lāčplēsis' wedding – Death of Lāčplēsis

== Contemporary background ==
The work was written during the Latvian national awakening. At this time a popular belief around Europe was that a Nation can be defined by the fact that it has a National epic while the Nations East of the Baltic sea were left without one. Finns wrote their epic Kalevala in 1835, Estonians published their Kalevipoeg 1857-1861. There were several attempts create a Latvian National Epic which were finally realized by the poet and military man Andrejs Pumpurs and released during the 3rd Latvian Song Festival on 1888. Unlike in the Finnish and Estonian text no original folk song are used in the Latvian story, but it's heavily based on Latvian folklore. By this time it was already considered to be an anachronism, but still amongst the people it became the National epic.

From the time of the Northern Crusades in the early 13th century, most of the land in the Baltic governorates was owned by nobles descended from the German invaders. In 1863, the Russian authorities issued laws to enable Latvians, who formed the bulk of the population, to acquire the farms which they held, and special banks were founded to help them. By this means, some occupants bought their farms, but the great mass of the population remained landless, and lived as hired laborers, occupying a low position in the social scale. This was the situation prevailing at the time of writing – thus, the strongly negative presentation of these German invaders had clear contemporary implications for the writer's own time.

Scholarship suggests that the legendary hero Lāčplēsis mirrors similar tales of strong men born of animals and who go on adventures. These tales are classified in the Aarne-Thompson-Uther Index as tale types ATU 650A, "Strong John" and AT 301B, "Jean de l'Ours" or "John The Bear". Indeed, according to professor Valters Nollendorfs, the author "utilized legends and folklore motifs" to compose the poem.

== Cultural impact ==
It is known to be one of the most influential works of Latvian culture. Interpretations of the story keep appearing frequently.

Based on the story at the context of the 1905 Russian Revolution, Rainis issued a symbolic play Uguns un Nakts (Fire and Night). There, he focuses on the relationships of Lāčplēsis and Spīdola, where Lāčplēsis is the symbol of strength and Spīdola the symbol of wisdom, beauty and change. While Spīdola is in love with Lāčplēsis, he decides to stay with Laimdota. Still, after Lāčplēsis falls into the Daugava during the battle, Spīdola promises to follow him and help him in the battle, giving hope for Latvian freedom.

During the Latvian War of Independence, the battles between Latvian and German troops under the command of Bermondt-Avalov were compared with the battle between Lāčplēsis and the Black Knight. The decisive victory of Latvians happened on November 11 next to the Daugava where it was promised in the epic, and ever since, it is called the day of the Bear Slayer. In 1930, a movie named Lāčplēsis was made.

The play Uguns and Nakts was frequently played during the Soviet occupation. Unlike the Soviet propaganda had intended it to show the battle between Latvians and Germans, the Latvian society started to identify the Crusaders with the Soviets. In 1988, the rock opera Lāčplēsis was performed more than 40 times, becoming one of the turning point of the 3rd Latvian National Awakening. Using the mythological narrative it depicted the occupation of Latvia, work of KGB, russification, the destruction of Christianity in Latvia etc. A memorable moment in the rock opera happened on the bewitched island where Lāčplēsis turned people who had turned into rock back into human flesh. Many saw this as a moment where people were wakened up from the Soviet sleep they were placed by the Soviet regime. A big emphasis in the rock opera was put on the ears of Lāčplēsis, in the final Lāčplēsis sings to the Latvians to call for him, he still has language and a word, but call for him even louder.

== See also ==
- Latvian mythology
- Laimdota (given name)
- Order of Lāčplēsis
- Latvian literature
- Lāčplēša Day
- Kalevipoeg – Estonian national epic
