= Jānis Jansons-Brauns =

Latvian revolutionary, literary critic and journalist (1872–1917)

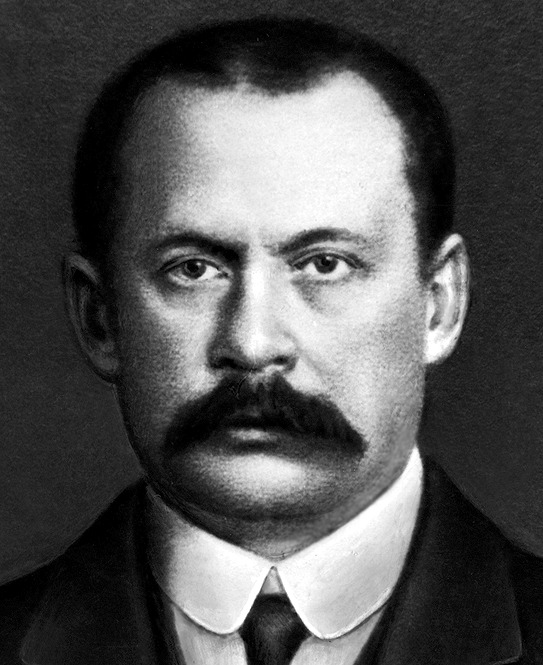
- Jansons-Brauns in 1915
- Born: Jānis Jansons; 18 March 1872; Grobiņas apriņķis, Courland Governorate, Russian Empire
- Died: 13 April 1917 (aged 45); North Sea
- Other name: Braun
- Education: University of Tērbatas
- Occupations: Literary critic, literary theorist, journalist
- Political party: LSDSP; RSDLP (Bolsheviks)

Jānis Jansons-Brauns (18 March 1872 – 13 April 1917) was a Latvian revolutionary, literary critic and journalist.

== Biography ==
Jānis Jansons was born in the large family of a farmer. After his graduation from Liepāja Nikolajas gymnasium he studied at the Faculty of History and Philology of the Imperial Moscow University was then transferred to the Faculty of Law of the University of Tērbatas where he became a member of the literary group Pīpkalonija. During this period he became a of the leading representative of the New Current movement and a member of the editorial staff of the newspaper Dienas Lapa.

In 1897, he was arrested and sent to Smolensk Governorate. In 1903 he returned to Latvia and in 1904 joined the Latvian Social Democratic Workers' Party and at its 1st congress was elected a member of the Central Committee and a member of the Foreign Committee. At the same time he started to use the pseudonym Braun and participated in the development of the LSDSP program.

During the revolution of 1905, he was the editor of the illegal newspaper Cīņa and the newspaper Dienas Lapa. In 1906, he emigrated through Finland to Belgium, then to England and worked in the Foreign Committee of the Central Committee of Latvian Social Democracy in London, Berlin and Switzerland and continued to be the editor of Cîņa from 1910 to 1914.

After the beginning of the First World War in 1914, he joined the Bolsheviks and worked in the London group of the LSDSP. After the February Revolution, he returned to Latvia, but was among the 11 passengers who died when a German U-boat sank the steamer "Zara" in the North Sea on April 13, 1917, which was traveling from London to Trondheim.

== Works ==
Jansons-Brauns in 1908 published a critical book “Fauns or Clowns?” (“Fauni vai klauni?”), in which he criticized the ideological foundations of decadent literature and modernist aesthetics, laid the theoretical foundations for a revolutionary revaluation of reality under the dominance of Marxist philosophy and demanded realism in art and literature. He is the author of the series of articles “Thoughts on Contemporary Literature”, which became the first examples of Marxist literary criticism. He is also the author of the book “Historical Materialism” (1910). With his articles, including the landmark “Will we have proletarian art?” (1913), acted as an active propagandist of Marxist philosophy and aesthetics.
