= A Love Stronger Than Death =

1933 play by Jānis Rainis

A Love Stronger Than Death (Latvian: Mīla stiprāka par nāvi) is a play by Latvian writer Jānis Rainis.

It was translated into Esperanto in 1933, by Ints Ĉaĉe, and then translated from Esperanto to Czech by Tomáš Pumpr.
