= Kārlis Balodis =

Latvian economist, statistician and politician (1864–1931)

- Born: 20 June 1864 "Bilstiņi" estate, Koknese parish (now Aizkraukle Municipality), Kreis Riga, Governorate of Livonia, Russian Empire
- Died: 13 January 1931 (aged 66); Rīga, Latvia
- Education: University of Tartu; University of Jena; Ludwig-Maximilians-Universität München; University of Strasbourg
- Occupations: Economist; Financist; Demographist; Statistician

Kārlis Balodis (German: Carl Ballod; June 20, 1864 – January 13, 1931) was a notable Latvian economist, financist, statistician and demographist. Most notably, he is the author of civilian rationing, which was first used in Germany during the First World War. Balodis has received the Grand Gold Medal of the Russian Academy of Sciences, as well as the Dmitry Tolstoy Prize.

== Biography ==
He was the youngest among three children; his grandfather was a preacher at the Vidzeme's church. Carl lost his father and mother early in his life. The family moved to Riga, where they lived in very cramped conditions.

He was self-taught, and in 1883, as external candidate, he graduated from gymnasium in Jelgava.

He studied theology in Dorpat from 1884 to 1887. In 1888, he was ordained as a Lutheran pastor and went to Brazil, where in 1889-1891, he unsuccessfully tried to establish a Latvian colony. In 1891-1892, he studied geography at the University of Jena in Germany and defended his doctoral thesis. From 1893 to 1895, he served as a Lutheran pastor in the Urals, and wrote studies on demography and statistics. In 1895, he moved back to Germany again, and studied economics at the Ludwig-Maximilians-Universität München and the University of Strasbourg.

He became known as the demographer after the publication of his book "Mortality, age composition and longevity of the Russian Orthodox population of both sexes" in 1851-1890.

== Career ==
Between 1884 and 1887, Kārlis studied theology at the University of Tartu. In 1888, he was sent to Brazil to work as a Lutheran minister. In 1891 and 1892, he studied geography at the University of Jena. Between 1893 and 1895, he worked as a minister in the Ural Mountains region, and wrote his first researches on demography and statistics. In 1895, he started studying economics at the Ludwig-Maximilians-Universität München.

After 1899, Balodis worked as an associate professor at the Friedrich Wilhelm University of Berlin. In 1905, he became an employee of the Prussian Statistics Office, and in 1908, he started work at the German Federal Ministry of Finance. In 1918, he became the first chairman of the Deutsches Pro Palästina Komitee zur Förderung der jüdischen Palästina-Siedlung (German Committee for the Promotion of Jewish Settlement in Palestine). In 1919, he worked on the civilian rationing system.

After the war, Balodis returned to Latvia, where he became a professor at the University of Latvia. In 1928, he was elected to the 3rd Saeima, representing the Labour League of Latvia. He died on 13 January 1931, during the session of the 3rd Saeima, and his seat was filled by Pēteris Zālīte.

== Ballod-Atlanticus and Der Zukunftsstaat ==
Balodis was also known as Ballod-Atlanticus after he adopted the name Atlanticus from Francis Bacon's book Nova Atlantis (1627). Under this name, he published the utopian book Ein Blick in Der Zukunftsstaat: Produktion und Konsum im Sozialstaat (A Look at the Future State: Production and Consumption in the Socialist State). The first edition, which ran to 3,000 copies, was published in 1898 with a preface by Karl Kautsky. A second edition which ran to 12,000 copies was issued in 1919, with a third edition of 5,000 appearing in 1920 and a final edition appearing in 1927 with the slightly different title of 1927 as Der Zukunftsstaat: Wirtschaftstechnisches Ideal und Volkswirtschaftliche Wirklichkeit (The Future State: Economic Ideal and Economic Reality). Several Russian editions were produced between 1903-06, one of which was authorised by Balodis. The second edition was also published in Russia but without the author's permission.

== Published works ==
Balodis primarily wrote these works in German:

- Der Staat Santa Catharina in Südbrasilien. Stuttgart, 1892
- Die mittlere Lebensdauer in Stadt und Land. Leipzig, 1899
- Ein Blick in Der Zukunftsstaat. Produktion und Konsum im Sozialstaat. Stuttgart, 1898 (Verlag J.H.W.Dietz Nachf., Berlin 1919)
- Die Sterblichkeit der Grosstädte, 1903
- Sterblichkeit und Lebensdauer in Preussen. Berlin, 1907
- Grundriss der Statistik enthaltend Bevölkerungs-, Wirtschafts-, Finanz- und Handels-Statistik. Berlin, 1913
- Die Bevölkerungsbewegung der letzten Jahrzehnte in Preussen und in einigen anderen wichtigen Staaten Europas. Berlin, 1914
- Palästina als jüdisches Ansiedlungsgebiet. Deutsches Komitee zur Förderung der jüdischen Palästinasiedlung 1918
- Sowjet-Rußland. Verlagsgenossenschaft Freiheit, Berlin 1920
- Der Bankrott der freien Wirtschaft und die notwendigen Finanz- und Wirtschaftsreformen. Jena, 1923
