= Pļaviņas Hydroelectric Power Station =

Hydroelectric power plant in Latvia

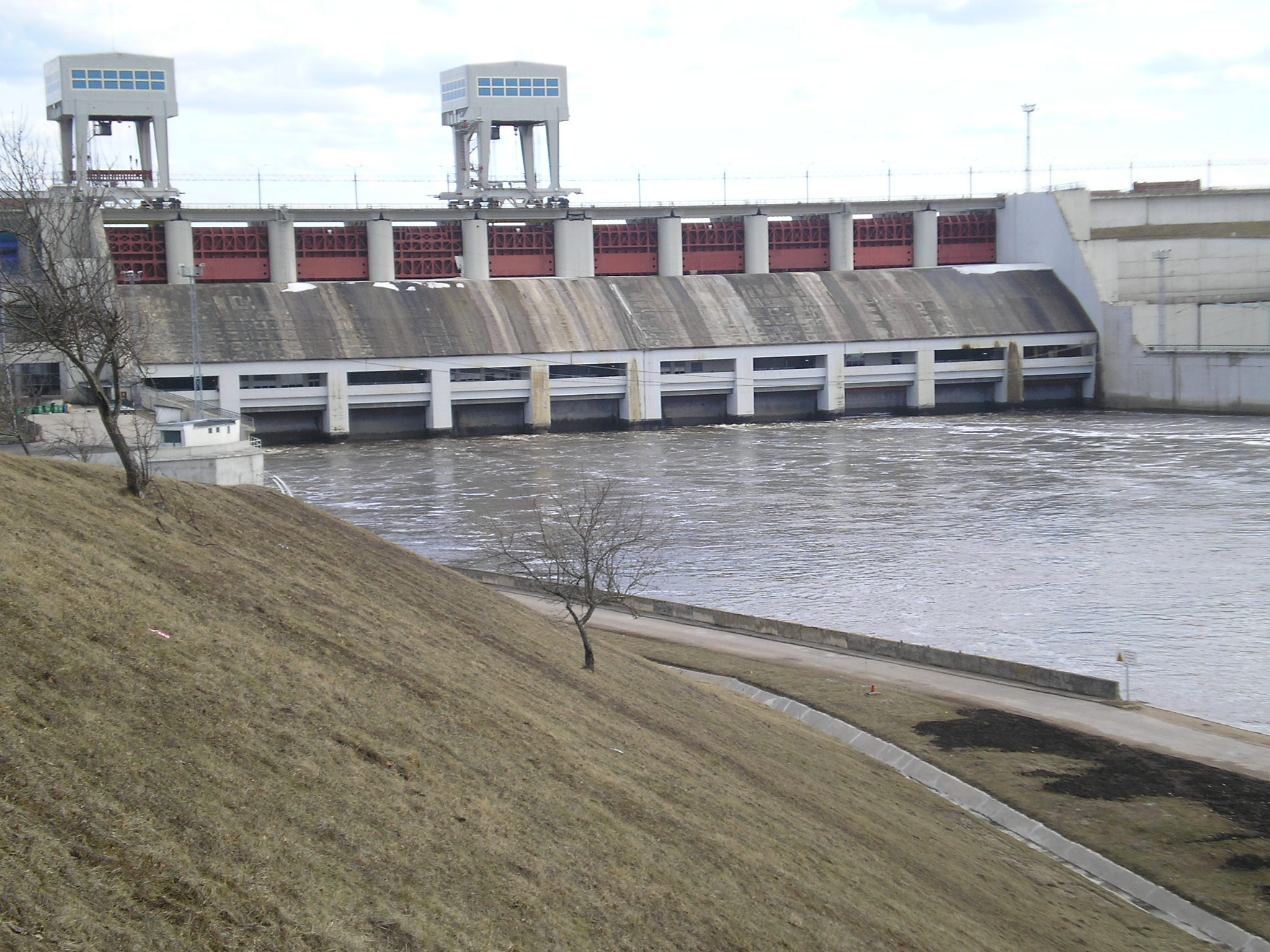
- Location: Aizkraukle
- Status: Operational
- Opening date: 1965

Power Station
- Coordinates: 56°35′00″N 25°14′30″E
- Operator: Latvenergo
- Commission date: 1968
- Type: Conventional
- Turbines: 10
- Installed capacity: 908 MW
- Capacity factor: 17.4% (2016)
- 2016 generation: 1,386 GW·h

The Pļaviņas Hydroelectric Power Station is the largest hydroelectric power plant in the Baltics and one of the biggest in the European Union. It is located in the Latvian town of Aizkraukle on the Daugava River. It has ten individual water turbines, with a total installed capacity of 894 MW.

The construction sparked an unusual wave of protests in 1958. Most Latvians opposed the flooding of historical sites and a particularly scenic gorge with rare plants and natural features, such as the Staburags. The construction of the dam was endorsed in 1959, however, after the purge of relatively liberal and nationally oriented leaders under Eduards Berklavs and their replacement by Moscow-oriented, ideologically conservative cadres led by Arvīds Pelše.

The plant was put into full operation in 1968. Between 1991 and 2001, six additional turbines were added to the original four, increasing the capacity to 868.5 MW. Reconstruction and overhaul of the units between 2007 and 2010 increased both the efficiency of the plant and its power output to 908 MW. In 2016, the plant produced 1,386 GWh.

== Araeology and heritage ==
Prior to inundation, a major salvage campaign was undertaken between 1959 and 1965 by the Latvian SSR Academy of Sciences. Nine archaeological expeditions systematically surveyed some 6,800 m^{2} along both banks of the Daugava at Pļaviņas, identifying 69 burial grounds, 22 settlement sites and seven hillforts. Excavators recovered over 2 500 artefacts—including nearly 30,000 sherds of pottery—and some 9,500 fragments of human and animal bone, supplemented by seed samples for palaeobotanical study and dendrochronological dating of timber structures. The work generated more than 1,100 pages of reports, 390 large-scale site plans and over 3,000 photographs, making it one of the most comprehensively documented rescue-archaeology projects in Latvian history.

Despite this intensive research effort, several landscape features of immense cultural and natural value were permanently lost beneath the reservoir's waters. The distinctive limestone cliff of Staburags and the ruins of Koknese Castle—long admired by artists and visitors alike—now survive only in archival records, photographs and local memory.

== Pumped-storage proposal ==
In 2015, Latvenergo carried out a feasibility study into converting the existing emergency spillways of the Pļaviņas dam into a pumped-storage hydroelectric scheme. The proposal would see two reversible pump-turbine units installed directly within the emergency spillway channel, allowing water to be transferred between the lower Ķegums forebay and the upper Pļaviņas reservoir. Under the plan, the units would consume about 36 MW in pumping mode and generate some 90 MW in turbine mode, exploiting the 35 m head between the two reservoirs. The spillways themselves—originally conceived in 1994 to boost flood safety by providing an additional 3,960 m^{3}/s of discharge capacity beyond the main outlets' 8,640 m^{3}/s at the normal maximum level of 73.3 m above sea level—would serve both flood relief and reversible flow duties. Environmental review highlighted possible impacts on fish migration and increased riverbank erosion, but found no significant barriers to proceeding with construction.

== See also ==
- Riga Hydroelectric Power Plant
