= Kalsnava Parish =

Parish of Latvia

- parish of Latvia
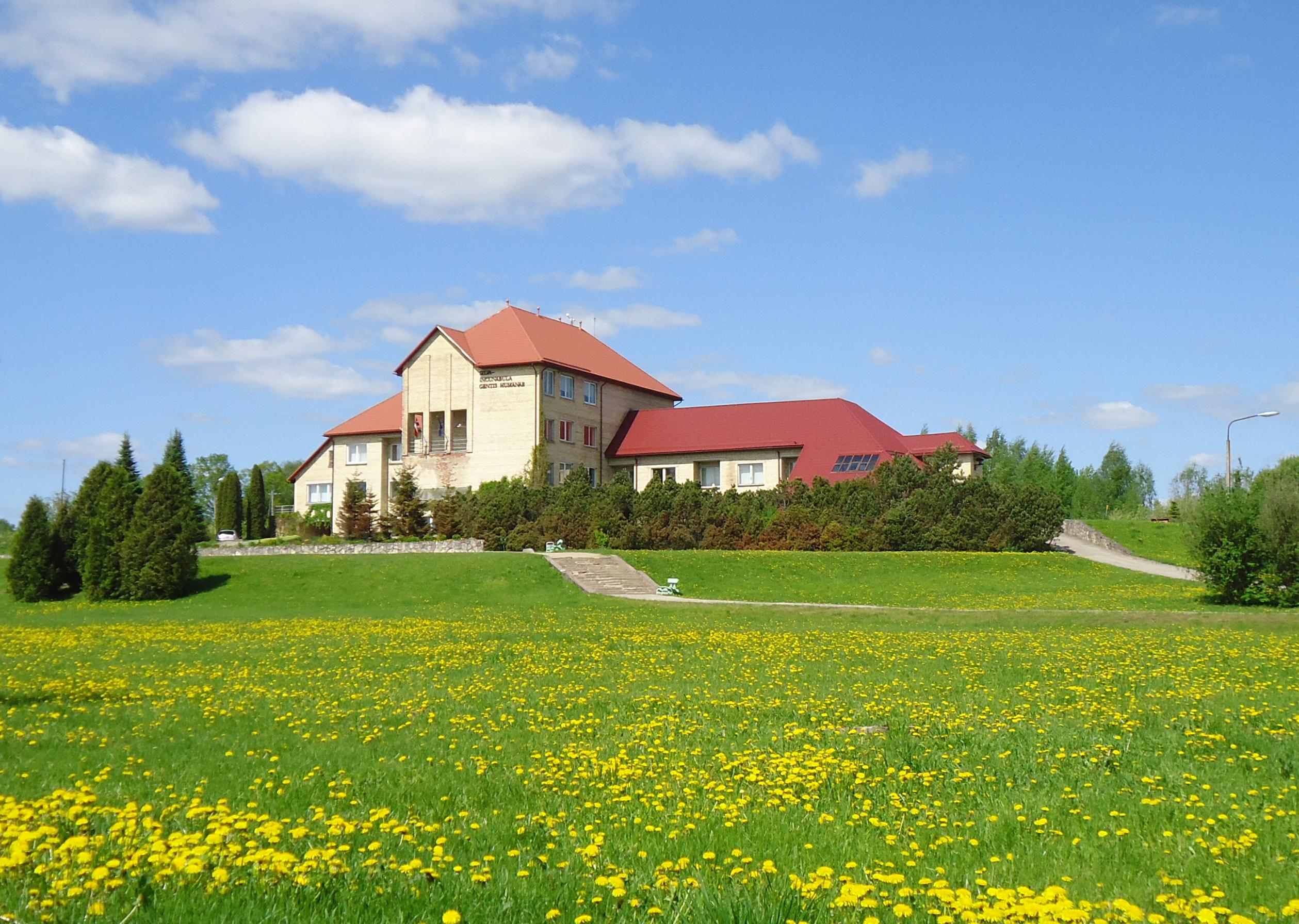

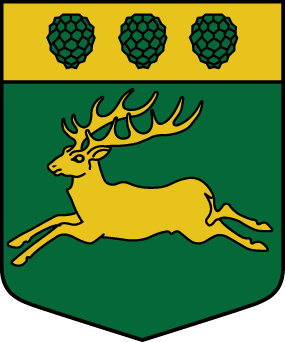
- Coat of arms

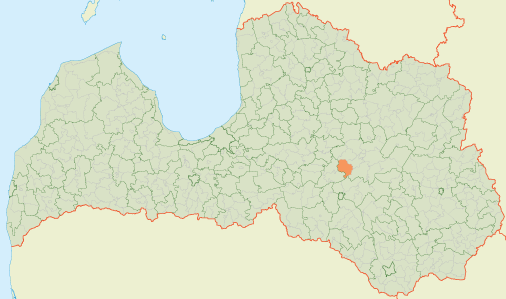
- 56°43′51″N 25°56′19″E
- Country: Latvia

Area
  - Total: 146.98 km^{2} (56.75 sq mi)
  - Land: 144.09 km^{2} (55.63 sq mi)
  - Water: 2.89 km^{2} (1.12 sq mi)

Population (1 January 2024)
  - Total: 1,441
  - Density: 9.8/km^{2} (25/sq mi)
- Website: www.kalsnava.lv

Kalsnava Parish (Latvian: Kalsnavas pagasts) is an administrative unit of Madona Municipality in the Vidzeme region of Latvia.

== History ==
Kalsnava Manor (Calcenoide) has been known since the 14th century. In 1935 the area of the parish was 278 km². In 1945 the parish councils of Jāņukalns, Jaunkalsnava and Veckalsnava were established, but in 1949 the parish was dissolved. In 1951 the village of Veckalsnava was liquidated and its territory was added to the villages Jāņukalns and Jaunkalsnava. In 1954 Jaunkalsnava village was reorganized into Kalsnava village. In 1964 Jāņukalns village was added to Kalsnava village. In 1990 the village was reorganized into a parish. In 2009, the parish is included in the Madona district as an administrative territory.
