= Rainis =

Latvian poet

Jānis Pliekšāns
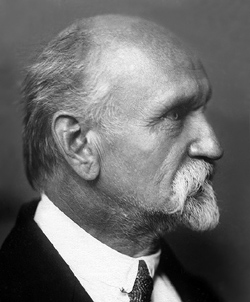
- Born: 11 September 1865 "Varslavāni" farm, Dunava parish, Courland Governorate, Russian Empire
- Died: 12 September 1929 (aged 64); Majori, Latvia
- Occupations: Poet; Playwright translator politician
- Spouse: Aspazija
- Awards: Order of the Three Stars, 1st class (1925)

Jānis Pliekšāns (11 September 1865 – 11 September 1929), known by his pseudonym Rainis, was a Latvian poet, playwright, translator, and politician. Rainis' works include the classic plays Uguns un nakts (Fire and Night, 1905) and Indulis un Ārija (Indulis and Ārija, 1911), and a highly regarded translation of Goethe's Faust. His works had a profound influence on the literary Latvian language, and the ethnic symbolism he employed in his major works has been central to Latvian nationalism.

== Early life ==
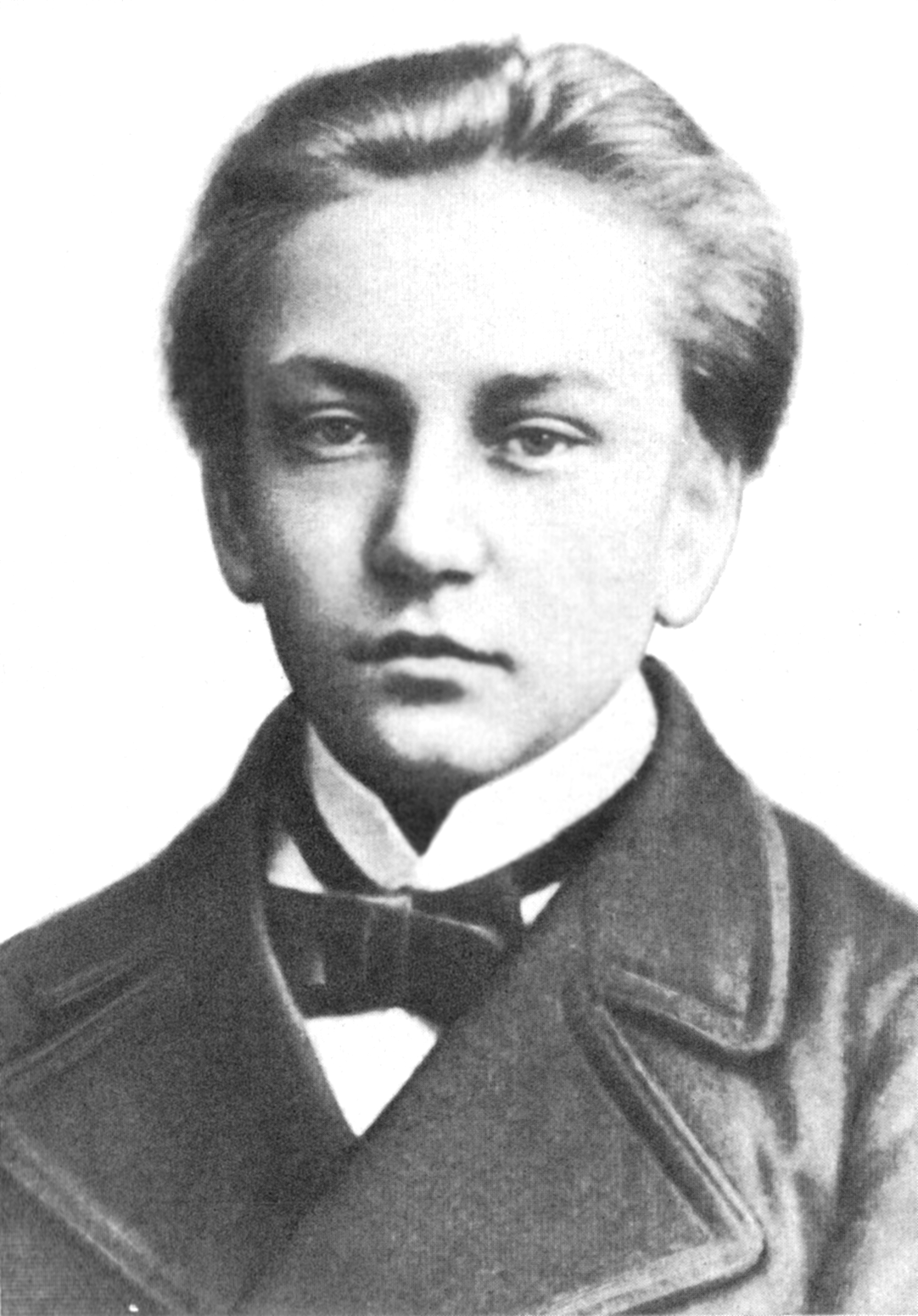
Rainis at age 15

Rainis was born on "Varslavāni" farm, Dunava parish in Jēkabpils Municipality. His father, Krišjānis Pliekšāns (ca. 1828–1891), was a tenant farmer. His mother was Dārta, née Grikovska (ca. 1828–1899), and he had two sisters, Līze (1854–1897) and Dora (1870–1950). During his education at the Riga City Gymnasium he met and befriended Pēteris Stučka, Dora Pliekšāne's future husband, who later become a prominent Latvian communist.

== Early career ==
Rainis studied law at the University of St. Petersburg, where he shared a room with Pēteris Stučka. While still a student, Rainis was already collecting folk songs, writing satirical and lyric poetry, and translating literature. Together with Stučka he edited a collection of epigrams and satire, Mazie dunduri (The Small Gadflies) and published Apdziedāšanas dziesmas (Mocking Songs) about the third All-Latvian Song Festival. The two men, however, would later split because of the differences between socialist and communist ideologies.

After completing his studies, he worked at the Vilnius regional courtrooms and with Andrejs Stērsts in Jelgava. Rainis wrote for Dienas Lapa (The Daily Page), Tēvija (Fatherland) and the Latvian Conversational Dictionary.

From 1891 to 1895 Rainis was editor in chief of Dienas Lapa (Daily Page). The Dienas Lapa scene was mostly a group of young Latvian liberal and socialist intellectuals who came to be known as the New Current. After attending the congress of the Second International in 1893, Rainis began to emphasize socialist ideology and news of socialist events in "Dienas Lapa." He is recognized as the father of Latvian socialism. It was during this period that he met Aspazija (pseudonym of Elza Pliekšāne, born Rozenberga), another Latvian poet and playwright active in the New Current. According to Encyclopedia Britannica, it was while editing the paper that Rainis developed "his own philosophy [which] showed no trace of Marxist materialism—he regarded life as an incessant series of mutations of energy."

Because of their social criticism and calls for various reforms, the New Current was viewed as a seditious movement and was the subject of a Tsarist crackdown. In 1897 Rainis was arrested and deported first to Pskov, and later to Vyatka guberniya (now Kirov Oblast). It was during this period of internal exile that Rainis translated Faust and other works from classical literature. Here he also produced his first collection of poems, Tālas noskaņas zilā vakarā (Far-Off Moods on a Blue Evening, 1903). In addition to Faust, Rainis also translated the works of William Shakespeare, Friedrich Schiller, Heinrich Heine, and Aleksandr Pushkin into Latvian. These translations helped to expand his native language by adding new words to its vocabulary.

== Foreign exile ==
Rainis was also socially active and politically prominent, being one of the national leaders of the Revolution of 1905 in Latvia and the New Current that foreshadowed it. With the failure of the Revolution, he emigrated to Switzerland together with his wife Aspazija, settling in Castagnola, a suburb of Lugano. As an émigré, Rainis wrote:

- plays — Zelta Zirgs (The Golden Horse) (translated to English 2012), Jāzeps un viņa brāļi (Joseph and His Brothers), Spēlēju, dancoju (I Played, I Danced), Daugava (The Daugava, 1916), and Ģirts Vilks;
- poetry — Klusā grāmata (The Quiet Book), Vēja nesta lapas (Leaves Upon the Wind), Tie, kas neaizmirst (Those, Who Do Not Forget), Gals un sākums (The End and the Beginning), Ave sol, and Sveika, brīvā Latvija (Hello, Free Latvia).

His dramatic ballad Daugava contained the first explicit demand for Latvian sovereignty:

Land, land, what is that land demanded in our song? Land, that is a state.

Those lines were removed by the censor when the work was first published in Moscow. After the defeat of Bermondt-Avalov's forces at Riga in November 1919, the ballad was performed at the National Theater to mark the first anniversary of Latvia's proclamation of independence; many soldiers carried this work into battle.

"Zelta Zirgs" ("The Golden Horse") was translated into English in 2012 by Vilis Inde. Latvian composer Lauma Reinholde wrote incidental music for this play and set several other texts by Rainis to music.

During his exile, Rainis published several more works, such as Gals un sākums (or "End and Beginning" in English, published 1912). These works used political and revolutionary symbolism and also borrowed ideas from Hegelian philosophy. He also penned plays which linked Latvian folklore to the country's modern, political struggles.

== Return to Latvia ==
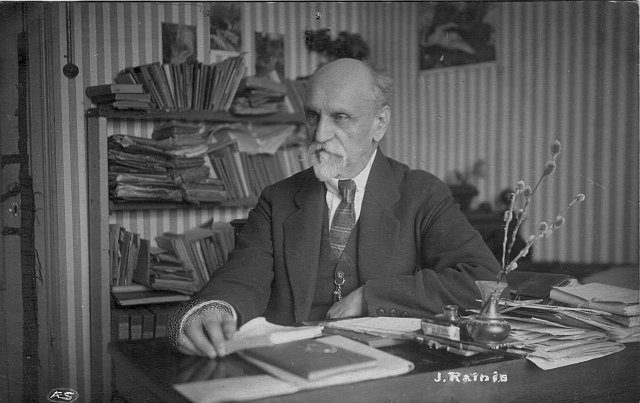
Rainis in the 1920s

Rainis and Aspazija returned to Latvia on 4 April 1920 and received a hero's welcome. They had served as the spiritual leaders in the fight for Latvian independence. Rainis, as a member of the Central Committee of the Latvian Social Democratic Workers' Party, resumed his political activities and was a member of the Constitutional Assembly of Latvia (Satversmes sapulce) and Saeima (Parliament) and of the Ministry of Education Arts Department, founder and director of the Dailes Theater, and director of the Latvian National Theatre from 1921 to 1925, Minister of Education from December 1926 to January 1928, and a member of the Cultural Fund and (Military) Order of Lāčplēsis Council. During this period he wrote:

- plays — Iļja Muromietis (Ilya Muromets), Mīla stiprāka par nāvi (A Love Stronger Than Death), Rīgas ragana (The Witch of Riga);
- poetry — Treji loki, Sudrabota gaisma (A Silvery Light), Mēness meitiņa (Moon Girl), Zelta sietiņš (The Gold Strainer), and others;
- memoirs — Kastaņjola (Castagnola).

Rainis had the ambition of becoming Latvia's president and became less prominent in politics when this ambition was not fulfilled.

Rainis did become one of the first recipients of the Commander Grand Cross of the Order of the Three Stars of Latvia – the nation's highest award – on 28 February 1925.

He died in Majori in 1929.

== Legacy and commemoration ==
Rainis' gravesite memorial, Rainis Cemetery

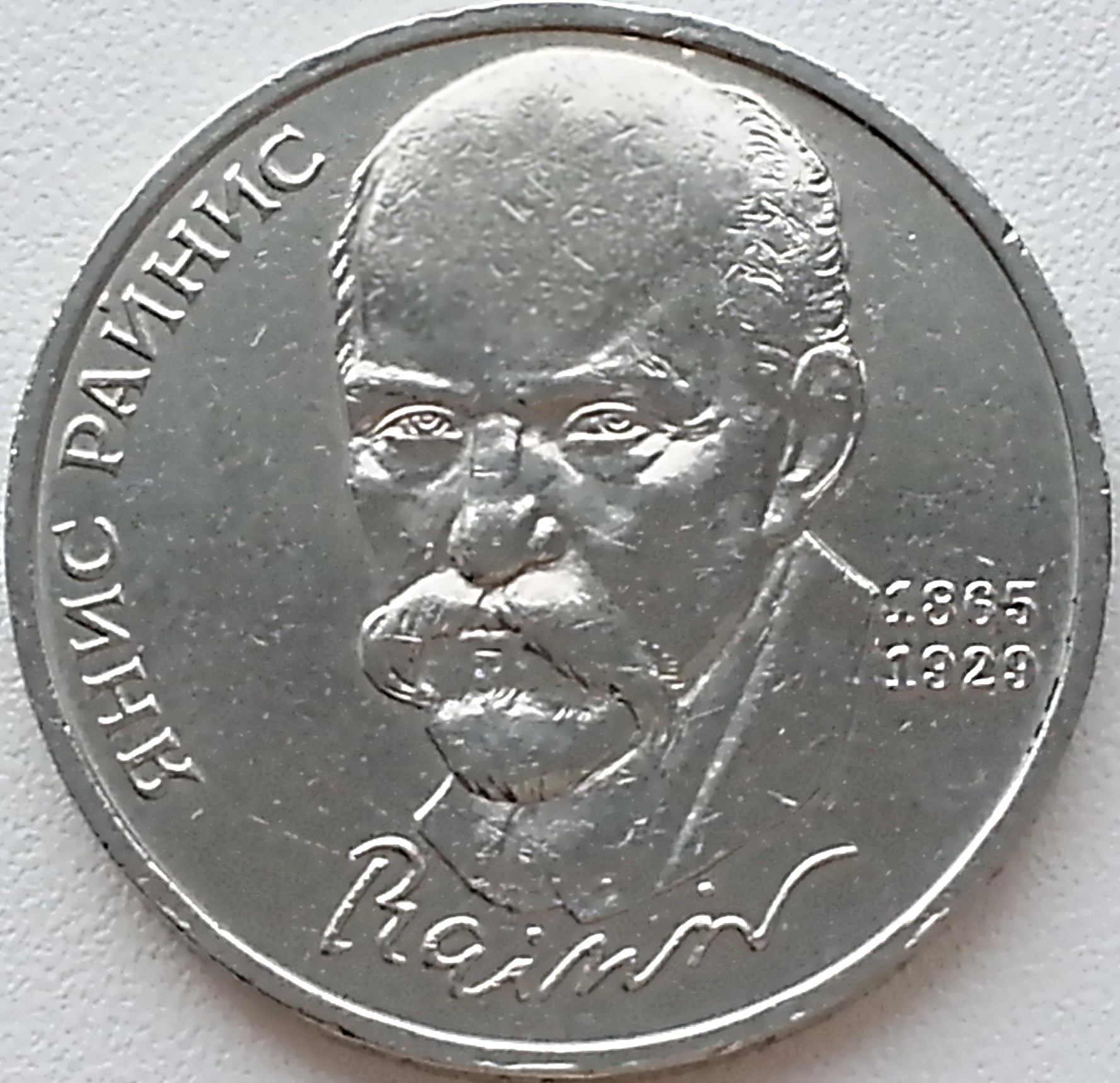
Soviet 1 Ruble coin commemorating Rainis

A number of Rainis' poetry collections were published posthumously: Sirds devējs, Dvēseles Dziesma, Lielās līnijas, and Aizas ziedi.

Rainis' statue at the Esplanāde in Riga is a gathering place that highlights the complex way his multi-faceted career and works are interpreted. It is the focal point for the national poetry festival, always held on his birthday, as well as a focus for the left wing, from the Social Democrats to the radical opposition to Latvia's education reform (in part because of Rainis' support for minority schools; he was instrumental to the founding of Belarusian schools in Latvia). Similarly, criticism of his work has often been strongly affected by politics; while the Soviets emphasized his socialism (his image even appeared on a commemorative Soviet rouble coin; being buried next to Rainis' grave in Rainis' Cemetery in Riga was an honour reserved for senior Soviet military), Daugava and other patriotic works were omitted from editions of Rainis' texts prior to the Third Latvian National Awakening.

== Works ==
=== Plays ===
- Pusideālists (Semi-Idealist, 1901)
- Uguns un nakts (Fire and Night, 1905)
- Zelta zirgs (The Golden Horse, 1909)
- Indulis un Ārija (Indulis and Ārija, 1911)
- Pūt, vējiņi! (Blow, Wind!, 1913)
- Spēlēju, dancoju (I Played and Danced, 1915)
- Krauklītis (The Little Raven, 1917)
- Jāzeps un viņa brāļi (Joseph and His Brothers, 1919)
- Ilja Muromietis (Ilya Muromets, 1923)
- Mīla stiprāka par nāvi (Love is Stronger than Death, 1927)
- Rīgas ragana (The Witch of Riga, 1928)

=== Poems ===
- Ave sol! (Ave Sol!, 1910)
- Daugava (1919)
- Saules gadi (Years of the Sun, 1925)

=== Collections of poetry ===
- Tālas noskaņas zilā vakarā (Distant Echoes on a Blue Evening, 1903)
- Vētras sēja (The Strewing of the Storm, 1905)
- Klusā grāmata (The Silent Book, 1909)
- Tie, kas neaizmirst (Those Who Do Not Forget, 1911)
- Gals un sākums (The End and the Beginning, 1912)
- Dagdas piecas skiču burtnīcas (Five Sketch-books of Dagda, 1920-1925):
  - Addio bella! (Addio Bella!, 1920)
  - Čūsku vārdi (Serpent Incantation, 1920)
  - Uz mājām (Going Home, 1920)
  - Sudrabota gaisma (A Silvery Light, 1921)
  - Mēness meitiņa (Little Girl of the Moon, 1925)

=== Collections of children's poetry ===
- Zelta sietiņš (The Golden Sieve, 1920)
- Puķu lodziņš (A Flower Window, 1924)
- Vasaras princīši un princesītes (Summer Princes and Princesses, 1924)
- Lellīte Lolīte (A Dolly Named Lolly, 1924)
- Putniņš uz zara (Bird on a Branch, 1925)
- Saulīte slimnīcā (Sun at the Hospital, 1927)

=== Children's plays ===
- Mušu ķēniņš (The Sovereign of Flies, 1923)
- Suns un kaķe (The Dog and the She-Cat, 1928)

=== Short stories ===
- Novelas (Novellas, 1925)

=== Memories ===
- Kastaņola (Castagnola, 1928)
