= Staburadze =

Cliff and waterfall in Latvia

Coordinates: 56.5786°N 25.4828°E

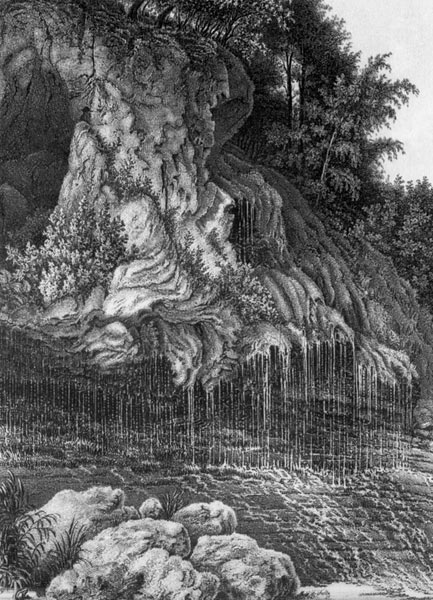
Staburags. 1866 depiction by Vilhelms Štafenhāgens

Staburags or Staburadze was an unusual 18-meter (59 ft) high cliff on the bank of the Daugava River in Latvia shaped and formed by lime-rich springs. According to a legend, it was once a girl in mourning who was petrified.

Since 1965, the cliff has been submerged at a depth of 6.5 meters (21 ft) due to the construction of the Pļaviņas Hydroelectric Power Station dam.

== In literature ==
In Andrejs Pumpurs' epic poem Lāčplēsis, Staburadze was the name of a goddess living in a crystal palace beneath the whirlpool at the foot of the cliff.
