= Jaunlatvija =

Latvian political party

Jaunlatvija ("Young Latvia") was a political party in Latvia.

The party, described as socially liberal, was founded on March 28, 2009 at the congress held in the National Theatre in Riga. Didzis Šmits was elected its chairman. Its supporters included ex-president Guntis Ulmanis and scientist Jānis Stradiņš, although the two did not join the party ranks.

Among party declarations, of note were their desire to involve younger people in politics and to integrate non-citizens into Latvian society.

== Municipal elections, June 2009 ==
The party took part in municipal elections in the localities listed below and won 3 seats.

- Riga (26 candidates): 0,31% of votes
- Tērvete (12 candidates): 9,51% of votes, 1 seat: Raivo Zalcmanis
- Babīte: 11.92%, 2 seats: Broņislavs Rimicāns, Ritvars Auziņš
- Daugavpils: 0.39%
- Daugavpils district: 2.33%
- Jēkabpils, 1.86%
- Kārsava: 3.79%

== Later activities ==
The party did not achieve any notable electoral success on the national stage in the future. In the run-up to the 2010 Latvian parliamentary election the party signed a cooperation agreement with the For a Good Latvia alliance, but unexpectedly voted against joining the list.

Jaunlatvija did not contest further elections and in April 2012 filed for dissolution. The party was dissolved on 15 August 2016.
