= Pēteris Zālīte =

Latvian philosopher, journalist and politician

Pēteris Zālīte (1 December 1864, Rauna Parish (now Smiltene Municipality), Kreis Wenden, Governorate of Livonia – 18 August 1939, Riga) was a Latvian philosopher, journalist and politician. He became a member of the 3rd Saeima in January 1931, representing the Labour League of Latvia and replacing Kārlis Balodis. In the elections to the 4th Saeima in October 1931, he retained his seat, which he held until the Saeima was dissolved following the 1934 Latvian coup d'état.
