= Miķelis Valters =

Latvian politician (1874–1968)

Minister of the Interior of Latvia
- In office 19 November 1918 – 31 August 1919
- Prime Minister: Kārlis Ulmanis
- Succeeded by: Alfrēds Birznieks

Personal details
- Born: 7 May 1874; 25 April 1874 O.S. Liepāja, Kurzeme gubernia, Russia (now Latvia)
- Died: 27 March 1968 Nice, France
- Party: Western European Latvian Social-Democratic Union (Vakareiropas latviešu sociāldemokrātu savienība, VLSS); Latvian Farmers' Union (Zemnieku savienība, ZS)
- Profession: Politician, Diplomat, Writer

Miķelis Valters (May 7, 1874 [April 24 O.S.] – March 25, 1968) was the first Latvian Minister of the Interior (1918–1919), member of the New Current intellectual movement, lawyer, politician, diplomat, social activist, and one of the authors of the Latvian Constitution. He was the first social activist who publicly advocated for a sovereign Latvian state. In the 1903 journal "Proletārietis" (The Proletarian) he wrote the article "Patvaldību nost! Krieviju nost!" (Off with the Monarchy! Off with Russia!) Recipient of the Order of the Three Stars Commander Grand Cross (1st class).

== Early life and education ==
Valters was born May 7, 1874, in Liepāja into the family of dockworker Pēteris Valters and wife Zane. He received his basic education at Liepāja's Church of St. Anne elementary school, subsequently at the Liepāja City School, while working as a typesetter's apprentice. In 1889 he began working at the Jaunliepāja railroad workshops, and graduated the Liepāja Realschule.

== Early career ==
Taken with the concepts of socialism, Valters landed a position at the "Dienas Lapa" (Daily Sheet) editorial office in Rīga. In May 1897 he was sent to jail for 15 months for his participation in the Jaunā Strāva (New Current) movement. While imprisoned, he entertained his first thoughts about a Latvian nation as a sovereign state. At the same time, he distanced himself from the Marxist generalizations and simplifications he felt had come to characterize Jaunā Strāva, and dedicated himself while in jail to more serious philosophical and political studies.

In 1898, a large number of Jaunā Strāva participants were released from jail and dispersed to various of Russia's gubernias. Valters luckily managed to cross the border with the German Empire at Palanga, subsequently settling in Switzerland. He studied at the University of Berne, and in 1907 completed his doctorate in political science at the University of Zurich. He then continued studies at the Sorbonne in Paris.

== Political activism ==
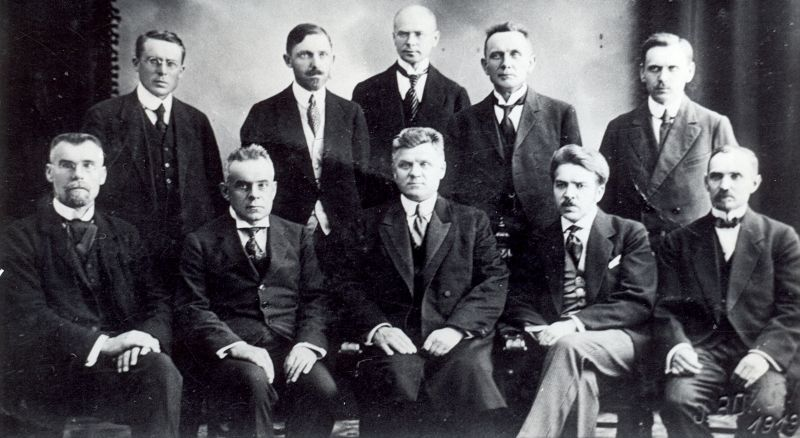
The provisional government of Latvia (Liepāja, April 1919). 1st row from left: Spricis Paegle, Miķelis Valters, Kārlis Ulmanis, Teodors Hermanovskis, Kārlis Kasparsons; 2nd row from left: Jānis Blumbergs, Eduards Strautnieks (Minister of Justice), Dāvids Rudzītis (State Chancery Director), Jānis Zālītis, Kārlis Puriņš.

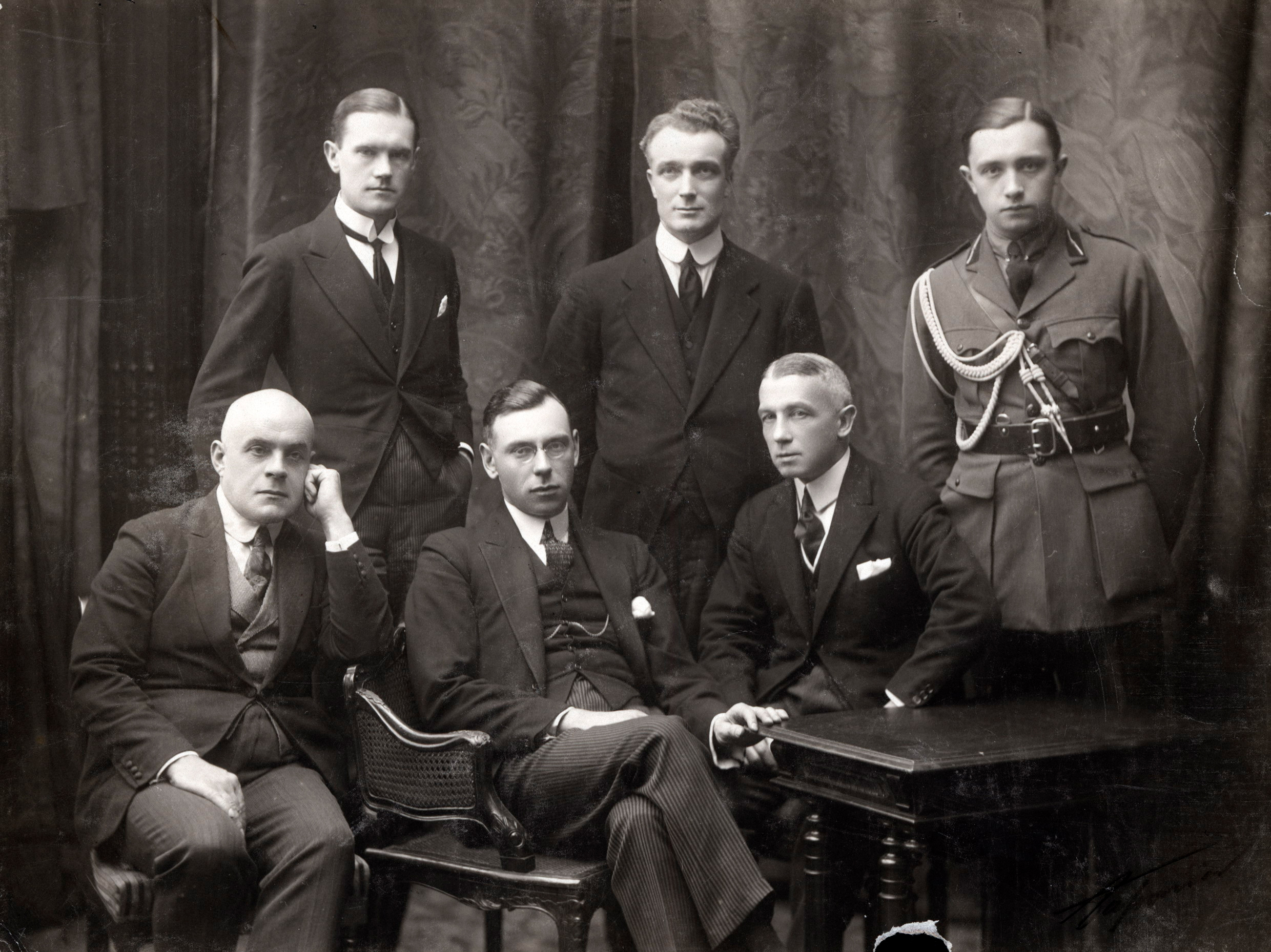
The Latvian delegation in Paris after receiving de jure recognition by the Entente Supreme Council in 1921. 1st row from the left, Miķelis Valters, Zigfrīds Anna Meierovics, Jānis Lazdiņš; 2nd row from the left: Oļģerds Grosvalds, Georgs Bisenieks, Jānis Tepfers.

In 1900, along with his associates Ernests Rolavs and Emīls Skubiķis, he founded Vakareiropas latviešu sociāldemokrātu savienība (the Western European Latvian Social-Democratic Union). From 1903 through 1904, Valters published the Union's newspaper, "Proletārietis" (The Proletarian).

Valters returned to Latvia during the 1905 Revolution to become the editor of the journal "Revolucionārā Baltija" (Revolutionary Baltics). Contrary to socialist revolutionary parties in Russia, Valters, Rolavs and Skubiķis lead the party wing which pushed national interests to the forefront, with proletarian-related interests relegated to a secondary role.

In 1906, Valters fled into exile through Finland back to Switzerland, then on to London. Along with his revolutionary oriented activities, he also busied himself with writing, publishing several collections of poetry: "Tantris" (1908), "Ēnas uz akmeņiem" (1910, Shadows on Stones) and "Mūžība" (1914, Eternity).

After the February Revolution, he returned to Latvia in May 1917 and was elected to the Vidzeme Land Council and was one of the founders of the Latvian Farmers' Union (LZS). At this time, he cut himself off from the social-democrats and formed a close friendship with Kārlis Ulmanis. (According to legend, he was the only Latvian politician who, after the Ulmanis coup, had the temerity to address Ulmanis as "Tu", the familiar "you.") During the German occupation (after WWI, during the War of Independence), Valters was one of the organizers and leaders of the Democratic Bloc in Rīga. On October 19, 1918, Valters and Esvards Traubergs submitted their petition to Germany's Chancellor Maximilian, requesting he support the aspirations to achieve independence for their nation.

Shortly thereafter, in November 1918, Valters was one of the founders and members of the People's Council, and participated in the proclamation of the Latvian State on November 18, 1918. After the establishment of the Latvian Provisional Council, he was appointed the first Minister of the Interior of the Republic of Latvia. He also became co-publisher of the newspaper "Latvijas Sargs" (Latvia's Guardian) (1919—1922).

During the German's April putsch (1919), Valters was briefly arrested on April 16.

== Diplomatic career ==
In September 1918, Valters began working at the newly founded University of Latvia. However, the following month, October, he was appointed to head the Latvian diplomatic delegation in Rome, then subsequently in Paris. He was one of the closest assistants to the first Foreign Minister of Latvia, Zigfrīds Anna Meierovics, working on Latvia's de jure recognition internationally and its admission to the League of Nations.

Valters is also credited with formulating the clause in Article I of the Latvian Constitution (the Satversme, adopted in 1922) stating that "the sovereign power of the State of Latvia is vested in the people of Latvia" (Latvijas tauta) rather than the Latvian people (latviešu tauta), and is thus responsible for laying part of the legal groundwork for a multi-ethnic nation-state and political nation. Baltic-German journalist and political activist Paul Schiemann (Pauls Šīmanis) subsequently made this the cornerstone of his revolutionary concept of separation of nation (Volksgemeinschaft—national community) and of state (Staatsgemeinschaft—state community), which formed the cornerstones of his pioneering Latvian model for implementing minority participation and rights.

Valters left the Farmer's Union Party in 1925.

In the latter half of the 1930s, in the press but mainly in personal correspondence with Kārlis Ulmanis and the Minister of Foreign Affairs Vilhelms Munters, Valters expressed criticism for the foreign policies which both were pursuing. In Valter's opinion, the deepest failure and tragedy of Latvia's diplomacy was their pursuit of a policy of neutrality which included a cleavage from France and Great Britain, for which he held Munters chiefly responsible, under whose leadership "neutralism became a German-Russian expediency, uninvolved in anyone's, even one's own, affairs". Since Valters had already reached retirement age, Munters repeatedly urged Ulmanis to grant Valters his pension and appoint some younger diplomat in his place. Ulmanis finally relented, that after envoy J. Lazdiņš in Belgium retired, Valters should be transferred from Warsaw to the less important posting of Brussels. Valters was appointed envoy in Brussels, in which position he remained until the Nazi occupation in May, 1940. Belgium was among the nations which never recognized the USSR's annexation of Latvia.

Toward the end of WWII, on January 27, 1945, envoys still representing Latvia's sovereign interests Jūlijs Feldmanis (Switzerland), Miķelis Valters (Belgium), and Vilis Šūmans (Estonia) sent a telegram to British Prime Minister Winston Churchill prior to the meeting of the Great Powers, emphatically protesting against the occupation and annexation of Latvia by the USSR.

After 1940, Valters lived in Switzerland and France, practiced law and journalism, and continued to serve Latvia's sovereign interests in his diplomatic capacity until his death, on March 26, 1968, in Nice, France. His remains were buried in Nice's East Cemetery and subsequently exhumed on August 11, 2020, returned to Latvia, and his ashes reburied in Rīga's I Forest Cemetery.

== Commemoration ==
- The Liepāja library is named for Valters.
- On May 21, 2009, the Latvian Ministry of the Interior held Dr. Miķelis Valters' 135th anniversary observation and unveiled his memorial plaque.
- On May 7, 2021, Valters' birthday, Miķelis Valters Street (Miķeļa Valtera iela) was unveiled in Liepāja, the city of his birth, along with a memorial plaque.
