= Ernests Blanks =

Latvian writer

Ernests Blanks, portrait painted during the Second World War by Kārlis Miesnieks

Ernests Blanks (13 September [O.S. 1 September] 1894 – 31 January 1972) was a Latvian writer and publicist. He was the first to publicly advocate for Latvia's independence in 1917.

Ernests Blanks was editorial writer of Dzimtenes Atbalss (Fatherland's Echo). At a time when others discussed the autonomy of Latvia and the other Baltic countries, Ernests Blanks dared to demand sovereignty for Latvia. Already on 21 July [O.S. 8 July] 1917 Ernests Blanks unequivocally wrote: "Our ideal is a sovereign Latvia." After the state of Latvia had been established he reminded that the Latvians had regained their long lost freedom. For some time he was a deputy of the first Parliament Tautas Padome, which preceded the Saeima. He wrote about the Saeima, but mostly about the Latvian National Awakening and its activists. He was one of them, but discreet about his own role. He is the author of about 700 editorials on Latvian national political issues (alone), and at least 15 books. Blanks devoted his life to defending the sovereignty of the state of Latvia through his writings. Thus, during the Latvian Soviet Socialist Republic, he was a persona non grata in his country.

== Biography ==
Blanks was born on 13 September [O.S. 1 September] 1894 in Braslava municipality in Valmiera County, Governorate of Livonia, Russian Empire. His parents were leaseholders until the family moved to Riga where he attended school. Starting in 1914, he studied history and philosophy at the Shanyavskiy University in Moscow as an unenrolled student. He was one of the leaders of the Latvian National Democratic Party (LNDP). In Latvia, Blanks was editor of numerous newspapers and journals, and published papers in even more. He was honoured with the Three-Star Order (of the 4th class) of Latvia in 1928. In 1945, Blanks fled in exile to Germany where he continued the editorial and publishing work. He died in exile January 31, 1972 in Palma de Mallorca, Spain.
