= Jaunā Latvija =

Latvian political party

Jaunā Latvija (Young Latvia) was a larger extreme right political group in Latvia. It existed from August 15, 1933 to August 17, 1943.
