= Andrejs Pumpurs =

Latvian poet

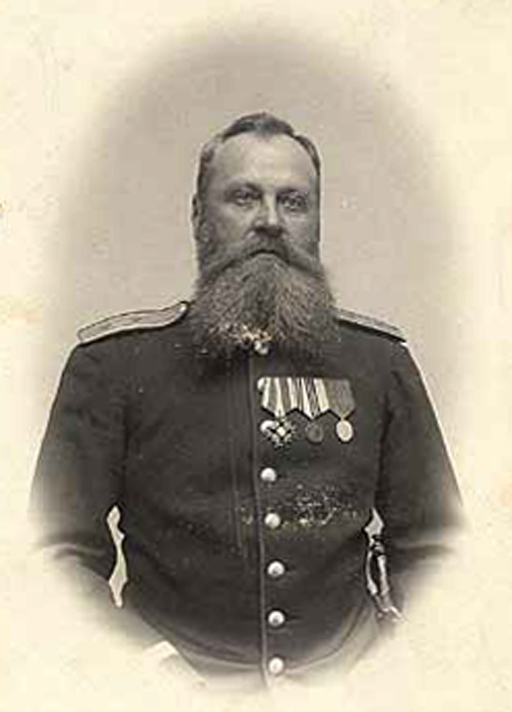
- Born: 22 September 1841; Lieljumprava Parish, Kreis Riga, Governorate of Livonia, Russian Empire (now Birzgale Parish, Latvia)
- Died: 6 July 1902 (aged 60); Riga, Russian Empire (now Latvia)
- Occupations: Poet, army officer

Andrejs Pumpurs (22 September [O.S. 10 September] 1841 on the left bank of the Daugava, in Lieljumprava civil parish, now Birzgale Parish – 6 July [O.S. 23 June] 1902 in Riga) was a poet who penned the Latvian epic Lāčplēsis (The Bear Slayer, first published in 1888) and a prominent figure in the Young Latvia movement. Working in the land before volunteering to fight in Serbia against the Ottoman Empire in 1876, he became a loyal officer in the Russian army and also a staunch promoter of the Latvian culture.

== Biography ==
Growing up on both banks of the Daugava river, he was one of three children from the civil parish chosen by the Lutheran minister for the German class of the church school in Lielvārde. Unable to continue his education after completion of the three-year course, due to his family's poverty, but working as a raftsman and doing odd jobs with his father, Pumpurs was exposed to the Latvian oral tradition, especially strong in the region of his birth, and to the legends that would be at the forefront of his works. His first poems and early sketches for the epic were written in Piebalga, a rural center of Latvian education and cultural life, between 1867 and 1872.

After a brief period in Riga, he left for Moscow in 1876 and was introduced to the Slavophile Ivan Aksakov and the editor Mikhail Katkov by Fricis Brīvzemnieks (Treuland). Pumpurs became the third Latvian to volunteer to fight with the Serbs and their Russian allies against the Turks, his experiences in Serbia strongly influencing his already fervent nationalism. His military career took him to Sevastopol and he received an officer's education in Odessa. In 1882 he returned to the Governorate of Livonia in what became the Ust-Dvinsk Regiment, participating in secret meetings of the Narodnaya Volya movement. From 1895 he worked for the quartermaster in Dvinsk (now Daugavpils), traveling widely to supply the Russian army, until he died of rheumatism after a trip to China.

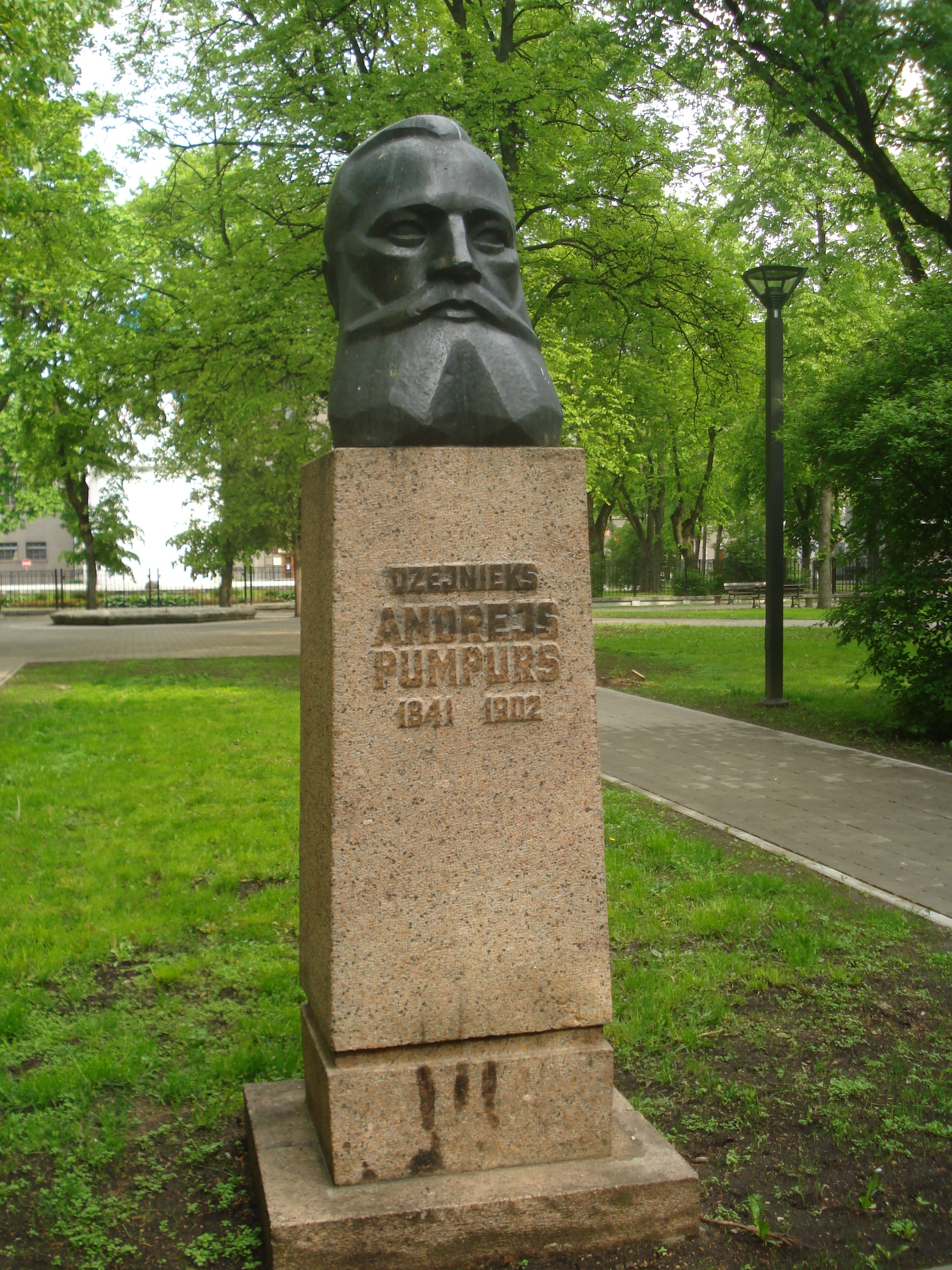
Memorial in Daugavpils
