= Dienas Lapa =

Latvian newspaper

1893 Dienas Lapa header

Dienas Lapa ('Daily Sheet') was a Latvian newspaper published from 1886 to 1905. It espoused progressive politics, including workers' rights and Latvian cultural autonomy. The editors of the newspaper included Pēteris Stučka (1888–91, 1895–97), Jānis Pliekšāns (1891–1895) and Jānis Jansons-Brauns (1905). In 1893, Rainis attended a socialist congress in Zurich, met August Bebel, and smuggled Marxist and socialist literature back into Latvia. Upon his return, Dienas Lapa shifted from a progressive political bias to promoting Marxist and Social Democratic ideas. Dienas Lapa became a rallying point for revolutionary intellectuals in Latvia. In 1897 the newspaper was closed down by the authorities for several months. Both Rainis and Stučka were arrested as revolutionaries and served time in prison and forced exile in Russia. It soon re-emerged, but adopted bourgeois orientation.

"Dienas Lapa" had broad circulation, but was also passed from person to person. Its influence can not be overstated because it inspired and communicated workers' strikes, uprisings against the Baltic-German land barons.
