= 1927 Latvian citizenship referendum =

A referendum on the citizenship law was held in Latvia on 17 and 18 December 1927. Voters were asked whether they approved of repealing the amendments made to the citizenship law by the Saeima. The referendum was passed and the amendments were cancelled. Of a total of 1,120,026 registered voters, only 242,798 cast valid votes.
