= History of the Baltic States =

History of the Baltic States may refer to:

- History of Lithuania
- History of Latvia
- History of Estonia
